= James Harvey Robinson =

American historian, academician (1863–1936)

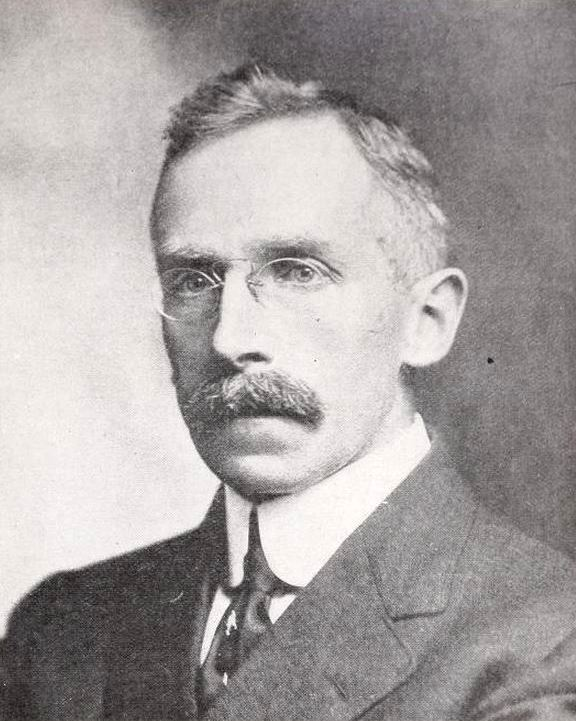
- James Harvey Robinson (c. 1922)
- Born: June 29, 1863; Bloomington, Illinois, US
- Died: February 16, 1936 (aged 72); New York City, US
- Resting place: Evergreen Cemetery (Bloomington, Illinois)
- Education: 1883–1884: Attended, Illinois State Normal College; 1887: A.B., Harvard; 1888: M.A., Harvard; 1890: Ph.D. University of Freiburg
- Employers: 1891–1895: U. Penn; 1895–1919: Columbia; 1919–1936: New School for Social Research
- Spouse(s): Grace Woodville Read (maiden; 1866–1927) (m. September 1, 1887)

James Harvey Robinson (June 29, 1863 – February 16, 1936) was an American scholar of history who, with Charles Austin Beard, founded New History, (Note: The term new history is not to be confused with the French term nouvelle histoire (new history), as coined by Jacques Le Goff and Pierre Nora.) a disciplinary approach that attempts to use history to understand contemporary problems, which greatly broadened the scope of historical scholarship in relation to the social sciences.

== Biography ==
Robinson was born in Bloomington, Illinois, to James Harvey Robinson (1808–1874), a bank president, and Latricia Maria Drake (maiden; 1821–1908). After traveling to Europe in 1882 Robinson entered Harvard University in 1884, earning his A.B. in 1887 and his M.A. in 1888. He continued his studies at the University of Strasbourg and the University of Freiburg and received his Ph.D. at Freiburg in 1890, where he wrote his dissertation under Hermann Eduard von Holst. In the summer of 1891, Robinson was appointed Lecturer of European history at what then was called the Wharton School of Finance, University of Pennsylvania. In 1895, he moved to Columbia University as a full professor, where he mentored numerous students who went on to become influential leaders in various fields, notably professorships around the United States.

Following some departures of faculty from Columbia over disputes of academic freedom – departures that included his friend Charles A. Beard – Robinson resigned from Columbia in May 1919 to become one of the founders of the New School for Social Research and serve as its first director.

Robinson died of a heart attack at his home in Manhattan. His body was interred at Bloomington, Illinois, in the Robinson family plot at the Evergreen Memorial Cemetery.

== Notable works ==
=== New history ===
Through his writings and lectures, in which he stressed the "new history"—the social, scientific, and intellectual progress of humanity rather than merely political happenings, Robinson exerted an important influence on the study and teaching of history. An editor (1892–1895) of the Annals of the American Academy of Political and Social Science, he was also an associate editor (1912–1920) of The American Historical Review, and, in 1929, succeeded James H. Breasted as president of the American Historical Association.

=== European history textbooks ===
It may well be the men of science, not kings, or warriors, or even statesmen are to be the heroes of the future.

— Robinson & Beard (1907)

Robinson's An Introduction to the History of Western Europe (1902, followed by several editions) was "The first textbook on European history which was reliable in scholarship, lively in tone, and penetrating in its interpretations. It revolutionized the teaching of European history and put a whole generation of history students and history teachers in debt to the author." (Harry Elmer Barnes)

=== The Mind in the Making ===
Robinson's book, The Mind in the Making: The Relation of Intelligence to Social Reform (1921), was a bestseller, introducing a generation of readers to the intellectual world of higher education. It argues for freedom of thought as essential to progress. The book also postulated that people usually substituted rationalizations for reason.

The book and the New History movement itself was not without staunch critics. Classical scholar and foe to progressive treatises of history Paul Shorey (1857–1934), in a review of the book, declared:

I have no sympathy with academic superciliousness toward popular fiction, popular drama, or the popularization of the real sciences so far as this is possible. And if Mr. Robinson had exercised his undoubted gifts of vivacity and apparent lucidity in these fields, I would have been the last to cavil at the crudities and superficialities inseparable from all such endeavors. But he makes his appeal as a critical thinker and a lifelong student of history, and it is therefore fair to remind him of what, in spite of the complaisance of American reviewing, he probably knows – that in the judgment of those whom he once would have regarded as his peers he is fast forfeiting his claim to the title of historian by his reckless disregard of the warning historia scribitur ad narrandum, non ad probadum [history is written in the narrative, not proven].

=== The Human Comedy ===
Robinson's last book The Human Comedy: As Devised and Directed by Mankind Itself (1937) contains his mature reflections on history after a lifetime of study.

- From Chapter 1: "It is a poor technic when attempting to convert one's neighbor to attack his beliefs directly, especially those of the sacred variety. We may flatter outselves that we are undermining them by our potent reasoning only to find that we have shored them up so that they are firmer than ever. Often history will work where nothing else will. It very gently modifies one's attitude. Refutations are weak compared with its mild but potent operation. To become historically-minded is to be grown-up."
- From Chapter 2: "It is true that biologists have, many of them, given up what they call 'Darwinism'; they have surrendered Spencer's notion of the hereditary transmission of acquired characters, and they even use the word 'evolution' timidly and with many reservations. But this does not mean that they have any doubts that mankind is a species of animal, sprung in some mysterious and as yet unexplained manner from extinct wild creatures of the forests and plains."
- From Chapter 9: "And, with supreme irony, the war to "make the world safe for democracy," ended by leaving democracy more unsafe in the world than at any time since the collapse of the revolutions of 1848."

== Other selected works ==
Books

- The Development of Modern Europe – An Introduction to the Study of Current History (coauthored with Charles Austin Beard) (1st ed.). New York: Ginn & Company. 1907. Retrieved July 16, 2021 – via Internet Archive. LCCN 07-36724; OCLC 1089721 (all editions).
Vol. 1. Boston Ginn.
Vol. 2. Boston Ginn.
- Petrarch – the First Modern Scholar and Man of Letters. (3rd impression) (1st ed.). G.P. Putnam's Sons – The Knickerbocker Press. 1909 [1898] – via Internet Archive. With the collaboration of Henry Winchester Rolfe (1858–1945) LCCN 16-6108 (2nd ed.); OCLC 643613304 (all editions).
- An Introduction to the History of Western Europe. Ginn & Company. 1903 [1902] – via Internet Archive. LCCN 02-23763; OCLC 717561 (all editions).
- The New History – Essays Illustrating the Modern Historical Outlook. The MacMillan Company. 1912 – via Internet Archive. LCCN 12-5184; OCLC 614912 (all editions).
1. "The New History". JSTOR 984033.
2. "The History of History"
3. "The New Allies of History"
4. "Some Reflections on Intellectual History"
5. "History for the Common Man"
6. "'The Fall of Rome'"
7. "'The Principles of 1789'"
8. "The Conservative Spirit in the Light of History"
- Outlines of European History (Part I). Ginn & Company. 1907 – via Internet Archive. LCCN 14-30277; OCLC 645050 (all editions).
Breasted, James Henry (1865–1935). "Earliest Man – The Orient, Greece, and Rome".
Robinson, James Harvey. "Europe From the Break-Up of the Roman Empire to the Opening of the Eighteenth Century".
- Outlines of European History (Part II) (revised ed.). Ginn & Company. 1918 [1907] – via Internet Archive. LCCN 14-30277; OCLC 645050 (all editions).
Robertson, James Harvey; Beard, Charles Austin (1874–1978). "From the Opening of the Eighteenth Century to the Present Day".
- History of Europe: Ancient and Medieval (with James Henry Breasted), 1920 online edition
- History of Europe: Our Own Times: The Eighteenth and Eineteenth Centuries: The Opening of the Twentieth Century and the World War (with Charles A. Beard). Boston: Ginn and Co., 1921 online edition
- The Mind in the Making – The Relations of Intelligence to Social Reform. 1921. Retrieved July 15, 2021. OCLC 251290603 (all editions).
→ London & New York: Harper & Brothers (publisher) (1921). (link). LCCN 21020447 – via Google Books.
→ London: Jonathan Cape (publisher); (introduction by H.G. Wells) (1923). (link) (new and revised ed.) – via Internet Archive.
→ London: Watts & Co. (publisher). (introduction by H.G. Wells). The Thinkers Library, No. 46.
→ 1st impression (1934)
→ 2nd impression (May 1933)
→ 3rd impression (May 1940). (link) – via Internet Archive.
→ 4th impression (September 1943). (link) – via Internet Archive.
→ London & New York: Harper & Brothers (publisher) (1939). LCCN 39-2958.
→ New York: Harper & Brothers (publisher) (1950). LCCN 50-6284.
- The Ordeal of Civilization: A Sketch of the Development and World-Wide Diffusion of Our Present-Day Institutions (1st ed.). Harper & Brothers. 1926 – via Internet Archive. LCCN 26-27483; OCLC 392259 (all editions).
Reissued as The Story of Our Civilization. William H. Wise and Company. 1926. OCLC 870859475 (all editions).
Vol. 1: "The Middle Ages"
Vol. 2: "Renaissance, Reformation, Revolution"
- The Human Comedy – As Devised and Directed by Mankind Itself (introduction by Harry Elmer Barnes) (1st ed.). New York: Harper & Brothers. 1937. p. ix – via Internet Archive. LCCN 37-623 (1st ed.); OCLC 33050032 (all editions).

Articles

- "The Original and Derived Features of the Constitution of the United States of America" (inaugural dissertation). University of Freiburg. 1890 – via Google Books. OCLC 251097060, 458065317, 601706752, 1073282942.
- Robinson, James Harvey (October 1890). "The Original and Derived Features of the Constitution". The Annals of the American Academy of Political and Social Science. 1 (2): 203–243. doi:10.1177/000271629000100203. ISSN 0002-7162. JSTOR 1008806. S2CID 144137664. OCLC 5546411901, 5723433640 (article).
- Robinson, James Harvey (September 1895). "The Tennis Court Oath". Political Science Quarterly. 10 (3): 460–474. doi:10.2307/2139955. ISSN 0032-3195. JSTOR 2139955. OCLC 5545334054, 4951155283 (article).
- "The Fall of Rome – Some Current Misapprehensions in Regard to the Process of Dissolution of the Roman Empire". An address read before the New England History Teachers' Association at Hartford. Boston: New England History Teachers' Association (publisher). April 27, 1906: 1–27 – via HathiTrust. OCLC 24451003 (all editions).
- Robinson, James Harvey (1911). "Reformation, The" . Encyclopædia Britannica. Vol. 23 (11th ed.). pp. 4–22. LCCN agr16000592 ; OCLC 3571848.
- An Outline of the History of the Intellectual Class in Western Europe. OCLC 10141764 (all editions).
→ 1st ed.. Lancaster, Pennsylvania: The New Era Printing Company. 1911 – via HathiTrust.
→ Revised ed.. Jamaica, Queens: Marion Press. 1914 – via Google Books.
→ 3rd ed., revised. Jamaica, Queens: Marion Press. 1915 – via Internet Archive.
- Robinson, James Harvey (May–August 1911). "The New History". Proceedings of the American Philosophical Society. 50 (199). American Philosophical Society: 179–190. ISSN 0003-049X. JSTOR 984033. OCLC 7836150273 (article).
- Robinson, J. H. (July 28, 1922). "The Humanizing of Knowledge". Science. 56 (1439): 89–100. Bibcode:1922Sci....56...89R. doi:10.1126/science.56.1439.89. hdl:2027/uc1.$b175604. ISSN 0036-8075. JSTOR 1647237. PMID 17781373 – via Internet Archive. OCLC 5552131098 (article).
- "Civilization". Cast-iron to Cole. Encyclopædia Britannica – A New Survey of Universal Knowledge. Vol. 5 (14th ed.). London: The Encyclopædia Britannica Company, Ltd.; New York: Encyclopædia Britannica, Inc. 1929. pp. 735–741 – via Internet Archive. LCCN 2901794 2-901794 (24 volume book set); OCLC 494104867 (all editions) (article).
Translations and Reprints, History Department, University of Pennsylvania
- Translations and Reprints – From the Original Sources of European History. Philadelphia: Department of History, University of Pennsylvania, University of Pennsylvania Press. New York: Longmans, Green. 1898–1899. Retrieved July 20, 2021 – via Internet Archive. LCCN unk83018682, LCCN 04-35794; OCLC 56478266 (volumes 1 & 2), OCLC 20158026 (all editions).
Vol. 1, no. 1 (1894). "Early Reformation Period in England – Wolsey, Henry VIII, Sir Thomas More and Hugh Latimer". E.P. Cheyney (ed.). Retrieved July 20, 2021 – via Google Books → (alternate link 1 → alternate link 2).;
Vol. 1, no. 3 (1894). "Restoration and Reaction". J.H. Robinson (ed.). Retrieved July 20, 2021 – via Internet Archive. → (alternate link).;
→ "The Reaction After 1815 and European Policy of Metternich" (revised ed.).
→ "The Restoration and The European Policy of Metternich (1814–20)". (4th ed.)
Vol. 1, no. 5 (1894). "The French Revolution". J.H. Robinson (ed.). Retrieved July 20, 2021 – via Internet Archive → (alternate link).;
→ "The French Revolution". (3rd ed.).
Vol. 2, no. 2 (1895). "The Naploeonic Period". J.H. Robinson (ed.). Retrieved July 20, 2021 – via Internet Archive.
→ "The Naploeonic Period" (1895) (rev. ed.).
Vol. 2, no. 6 (1895). "The Period of the Early Reformation in Germany". J.H. Robinson & Merrick Whitcomb (eds.). Retrieved July 20, 2021 – via Internet Archive → (alternate link 1 → alternate link 2) (registration required).; OCLC 7851839 (all editions).
→ "Period of the Early Reformation in Germany" (1898). (5th ed.).
Vol. 3, no. 6 (1896). "The Pre-Reformation Period". J.H. Robinson (ed.). Retrieved July 20, 2021 – via Google Books → (alternate link).;
Vol. 5, no. 2 (1898). "Protests of the Cour Des Aides – April 10, 1775". J.H. Robinson (ed.). English translation by Grace Read Robinson. Retrieved July 20, 2021 – via Google Books → (alternate link 1 → alternate link 2).; OCLC 55495427 (all editions).

== Reflections by other historians ==
Historian Jay Green, in 1999, stated:

From his innovations in historical methodology and research to his revisions of secondary and undergraduate pedagogy, Robinson endeavored to reform the modern study of history, making it relevant and useful to contemporary peoples. A quintessential Progressive, he combined astute in erudite thinking with a penchant for activism in order to challenge his professional colleagues' "obsolete" conception of history and to demonstrate written history's potential for inspiring social improvement.

Jack Pole, an American history specialist from Britain, in 1972, skeptically remarked:

[S]everal of the major figures of the period, including Osgood, Andrews, Morison, Wertenbaker, Miller and Nevins, writing history that would probably have been exactly the same if the New History school had never existed; and later commentators, so far from accepting the triumph of the New History, came to conclusion that, by at latest the end of World War II, its frontier of settlement had closed.

== Selected former students ==
Barnard College, Columbia College, Columbia University (1895–1919)
- James Thomson Shotwell (1874–1965)
- Francis William Coker (1878–1963)
- Edmund H. Oliver (1882–1935)
- Clara Woolie Mayer (1895–1988)
- Edgar Wallace Knight (1886–1953)
- Harry Elmer Barnes (1889–1968)
- Katharine DuPre Lumpkin (1897–1988)
- Preserved Smith, (1880–1941)

== Family ==
James Harvey Robinson – on September 1, 1887, in Bloomington, Illinois – married Grace Woodville Read (maiden; 1866–1927). They had no children. Robinson was a brother of botanist Benjamin Lincoln Robinson (1864–1935). By way of Robinson's wife's sister – Isabel Hamilton "Delle" Read (maiden; 1858–1923), the second wife of John Lewis (1842–1921) – Robinson was an uncle to Read Lewis (1887–1984), a lawyer who, among other things, in 1921 founded the Foreign Language Information Service and in 1940 co-founded the literary magazine Common Ground.

== Bibliography ==
=== References ===
News media

- New York Daily News (February 17, 1936). "James Harvey Robinson" (obituary). Vol. 17, no. 202 (Main ed.). p. 31 – via Newspapers.com.
- New York Times, The (May 6, 1919). "History Professor Quits at Columbia – James H. Robinson Resigns to Lecture in the New School for Social Research" (PDF). Vol. 68, no. 22382. p. 10 – via TimesMachine.
Books, journals, magazines, and papers
- Barnes, Harry Elmer (1927). "Chapter 10: James Harvey Robinson". In Odum, Howard Washington (1884–1954) (ed.). American Master of Social Science: An Approach to the Study of Social Sciences Through a Neglected Field of Biography. New York: Henry Holt & Company. pp. 321–408 – via Internet Archive. OCLC 810042772 (all editions).
- Britannica.com (1999) [last updated June 25, 2021]. "James Harvey Robinson – American historian" (online).
- Green, Jay D. (1999). "Robinson, James Harvey 1863–1936". M–Z. Encyclopedia of Historians and Historical Writing. Vol. 2. London & Chicago: Fitzroy Dearborn Publishers. pp. 998–999. ISBN 978-1884964336 – via Internet Archive. LCCN 98-193149; .
- Harvard College: Class of 1887; Furber, George Pope (1864–1919), Class Secretary (1893). "Record of the Class: June 1890–June 1893 – James Harvey Robinson". Secretary's Report. Vol. 3. Burlington, Vermont: Free Press Association. p. 85 – via Google Books. OCLC 903699115, 903699115.
- Hendricks, Luther Virgil (January 1949). "James Harvey Robinson and the New School for Social Research – An Academic Reform Following the First World War". Journal of Higher Education. 20 (1): 1–11, 58. doi:10.2307/1976157. ISSN 0022-1546. JSTOR 1976157. OCLC 8142350295, 7348905875 (article).
- Pole, Jack Richon [in German] (1973) [read October 20, 1972]. "The New History and the Sense of Social Purpose in American Historical Writing". Transactions of the Royal Historical Society. 23. Royal Historical Society: 221–242. doi:10.2307/3678879. ISSN 0080-4401. JSTOR 3678879. S2CID 155001207. OCLC 9522304, 4937688516, 8271560744 (article).
- Robinson, James Harvey; Beard, Charles Austin (1907). The Development of Modern Europe – An Introduction to the Study of Current History (1st ed.). New York: Ginn & Company Retrieved July 16, 2021 – via Internet Archive. LCCN 07-36724; OCLC 1089721 (all editions).
Vol. 1. Boston Ginn.
Vol. 2. Boston Ginn.
- Robinson, James Harvey (1921). The Mind in the Making – The Relations of Intelligence to Social Reform. Retrieved July 15, 2021. OCLC 251290603 (all editions).
→ London & New York: Harper & Brothers (publisher) (1921). (link). LCCN 21020447 – via Google Books.
→ London: Jonathan Cape (publisher); (introduction by H.G. Wells) (1923). (link) (new and revised ed.) – via Internet Archive.
→ London: Watts & Co. (publisher). (introduction by H.G. Wells). The Thinkers Library, No. 46.
→ 1st impression (1934)
→ 2nd impression (May 1933)
→ 3rd impression (May 1940). (link) – via Internet Archive.
→ 4th impression (September 1943). (link) – via Internet Archive.
→ London & New York: Harper & Brothers (publisher) (1939). LCCN 39-2958.
→ New York: Harper & Brothers (publisher) (1950). LCCN 50-6284.
- Robinson, James Harvey; (introduction by Harry Elmer Barnes) (1937). "Introduction". The Human Comedy – As Devised and Directed by Mankind Itself (1st ed.). New York: Harper & Brothers. p. ix – via Internet Archive. LCCN 37-623 (1st ed.); OCLC 33050032 (all editions).
- Rosenberg, Rosalind (2004). Changing the Subject: How the Women of Columbia Shaped the Way We Think About Sex and Politics. Columbia University Press. p. 125 – via Google Books. LCCN 2004-55135; ISBN 978-0-2311-2644-1; OCLC 896998682 (all editions).
- Shorey, Paul (1857–1934) (March 17, 1923). "Book Reviews: Propaganda Masking as History". The Independent. 110 (3838): 197–198 – via Google Books.

Genealogical archives

- Parsons, Henry (1835–1905), member of the New York Genealogical and Biographical Society (1912). Parsons Family – Descendants of Cornet Joseph Parsons: Springfield, 1636 – Northhampton, 1655. OCLC 944029064 (all editions).
→ Holton, David-Parsons (1812–1883). New York (1877). LCCN 86-211025 (microfilm); LCCN 09-18732.
→ Parsons, Henry (1835–1905). New York: Frank Allaben Genealogical Company (1912) (link – via Internet Archive). LCCN 13-21459; OCLC 3789524.
→ Vol. 2. Parsons, Henry (1835–1905) (1920). (link). New Haven, Connecticut: The Tuttle, Morehouse and Taylor Co. p. 536 – via Internet Archive.
→ Parsons, Gerald James. Baltimore: Gateway Press, Inc. (1984) (link – via Internet Archive) → (registration required). LCCN 83-82833.
Nabu Press (2010)
- Wright, Henry Parks (1839–1918), Class Secretary (compiler) (1914). "John Lewis". History of the Class of 1868, Yale College, 1864–1914. New Haven: The Tuttle, Morehouse & Taylor Press. pp. 176–179 – via Internet Archive. LCCN 1401905 1-401905; OCLC 16422116 (all editions).
