= Samuel French (disambiguation) =

Samuel French (1821–1898) was an American entrepreneur and publisher.

Samuel French may also refer to:

  - Samuel French, Inc. (US)
  - Samuel French Ltd. (UK)
- S. Bassett French (1820–1898), Virginia attorney, judge, Confederate officer and writer
- Samuel Gibbs French (1818–1910), American military officer, Confederate major general and planter
  - SS Samuel G. French, a Liberty ship
- Samuel S. French (1841–1913), American soldier who fought for the Union in the American Civil War
