= Richard J. Cox =

American academic and archivist

Richard J. Cox (February 9, 1950 - July 11, 2026) was an American archivist, educator, and author who played a leading role in professionalizing archival studies in the United States.

== Education and career ==
Cox earned a B.A. with honors in history from Towson State College in 1972, an M.A. in history from the University of Maryland in 1978, and a Ph.D. in library and information science from the University of Pittsburgh in 1992.

Cox began his career in the 1970s as a practicing historian and archivist at the Maryland Historical Society (1972–1978). He then worked for the City of Baltimore (1978–1983), the Alabama Department of Archives and History (1983–1986), and the New York State Archives and Records Administration (1986–1988).

In 1988 he joined the faculty at the University of Pittsburgh School of Information as a lecturer, and, after receiving the doctorate in 1992, became a tenure-track professor. He established an archives program that became a model for graduate archival education. He was promoted to professor in 2000. He retired in 2017.

=== Society of American Archivists ===
Cox was elected to the Society of American Archivists (SAA) Council in 1986. He chaired the SAA committee that drafted the first graduate archival education guidelines in 1988.

In 1989 his service to the profession was recognized with election as a Fellow of the SAA.

He won the Waldo Gifford Leland Award for "writing of superior excellence and usefulness in the field of archival history, theory, or practice" in 1991, 2002 and 2005.

Cox was appointed editor of the journal, American Archivist, from 1991 to 1995. He was publications editor for SAA from 2004 to 2007.

== Selected Publications ==
- Cox, Richard J. (Summer 1986). "Professionalism and Archivists in the United States". American Archivist. 49 (3): 229–247.
- Cox, Richard J. (1991). "Library History and Library Archives in the United States". Libraries & Culture. 26 (4): 569–593.
- Cox, Richard J. (1992). Managing Institutional Archives: Foundational Principles and Practices. New York: Greenwood Press.
- Cox, Richard J. (1994). The First Generation of Electronic Records Archivists in the United States: A Study in Professionalization. New York: Haworth Press.
- Cox, Richard J. (2000). Closing an Era: Historical Perspectives on Modern Archives and Records Management. Westport, CT: Greenwood Press.
- Cox, Richard J. (2001). Managing Records as Evidence and Information. Westport, CT: Quorum Books.
- Cox, Richard J.; Wallace, David A., eds. (2002). Archives and the Public Good: Accountability and Records in Modern Society. Westport, Connecticut: Quorum Books. pp. vi+340. ISBN 978-1-56720-469-8.
- Cox, Richard J. (2004). No Innocent Deposits: Forming Archives by Rethinking Appraisal. Lanham, MD: Scarecrow Press.
- Cox, Richard J. (2005). Archives and Archivists in the Information Age. New York: Neal-Schuman.
- O'Toole, James M.; Cox, Richard J. (2006). Understanding Archives and Manuscripts (2nd ed.). Chicago: Society of American Archivists.
- Cox, Richard J. (2006). Ethics, Accountability, and Recordkeeping in a Dangerous World. London: Facet.
- Cox, Richard J. (2014). "Lester J. Cappon, an Unwritten Textbook, and Early Archival Education in the United States". Information & Culture. 49 (3): 327–350.
