= Nellie Neilson =

American historian (1873-1947)

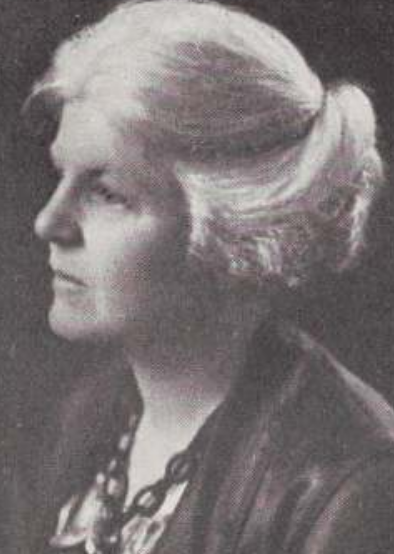
- Nellie Neilson, from the 1924 Mount Holyoke College yearbook
- Born: April 5, 1873; Philadelphia, Pennsylvania, U.S.
- Died: May 26, 1947 (aged 74); South Hadley, Massachusetts, U.S.
- Burial place: West Laurel Hill Cemetery, Bala Cynwyd, Pennsylvania, U.S.

Academic background
- Education: Bryn Mawr College
- Thesis: Economic Conditions on the Manors of Ramsey Abbey (1899)
- Academic advisors: Charles McLean Andrews; Frederic William Maitland; Paul Vinogradoff

Academic work
- Discipline: History
- Sub-discipline: Rural Medieval England
- Institutions: Mount Holyoke College

Nellie Neilson (April 5, 1873 – May 26, 1947) was an American historian and educator. She focused on English medieval studies and taught history at Mount Holyoke College from 1902 to 1939. She was the first woman elected as a fellow to the Medieval Academy of America; as president of the American Historical Association; and to have an article published in The American Historical Review.

== Early life and education ==
Neilson was born April 5, 1847, in Philadelphia, Pennsylvania, to William George Neilson and Mary Louise Neilson. She studied Greek and English at Bryn Mawr College and graduated with an A.B. in 1893. She studied English and History as a graduate student at Bryn Mawr and graduated with an A.M. in 1894. She received a Ph.D. in 1899 and was one of only eight women in the United States who received a Ph.D. before 1900. She studied under Charles McLean Andrews at Bryn Mawr. She studied philology and history for one year at the University of Cambridge under Frederic William Maitland and two years at the University of Oxford under Paul Vinogradoff.

She received honorary doctorate degrees from Smith College in 1939 and Russell Sage College in 1940.

== Career ==
She taught at Agnes Irwin School in Philadelphia from 1897 to 1900, and lectured at Bryn Mawr from 1900 to 1902. In 1902 she moved to Mount Holyoke College as an instructor in history, and in 1904 was appointed professor of European history. She rose to the rank of full professor in 1905 and worked in that position until her retirement in 1939.

In 1897, a paper derived from her doctoral dissertation, Boon-Services on the Estates of Ramsey Abbey, was published in The American Historical Review. She was the first woman to be published in that journal. She focused her studies on the agrarian, economic, and legal history of medieval England. She published over forty articles and reviews in journals including American Economic Review, The Economic History Review, Harvard Law Review, History, and Speculum.

In 1926, she was the first woman elected a fellow of the Medieval Academy of America. In 1943, she was the first woman elected as president of the American Historical Association. She was a member of the English Place-Name Society, the Institute of Historical Research, the Royal Historical Society and the Selden Society.

She died May 26, 1947, at her home in South Hadley, Massachusetts, and was interred at West Laurel Hill Cemetery in Bala Cynwyd, Pennsylvania.

== Publications ==
- "Boon-Services on the Estates of Ramsey Abbey.", American Historical Review 2 (1897): 213-24
- Economic Conditions on the Manors of Ramsey Abbey, Philadelphia: Sherman & Co., 1898
- Customary Rents, Oxford Study in Social and Legal History, London: Oxford University Press, 1910
- "Rents and Services" In Survey of the Honour of Denbigh 1334, British Academy Records of the Social and Economic History of England and Wales, London: Oxford University Press, 1914
- A Terrier of Fleet, Lincolnshire, British Academy Records of the Social and Economic History of England and Wales, London: Oxford University Press, 1920
- "Custom and the Common Law in Kent", Harvard Law Review 38 (1925): 482-98
- The Cartulary and Terrier of the Priory of Bilsington, Kent, British Academy Records of the Social and Economic History of England and Wales, London: Oxford University Press, 1928
- "English Manorial Forms", American Historical Review 34 (1929) 725-39
- Medieval Agrarian Economy, Berkshire Studies in European History, New York: Henry Holt, 1936
- "Early English Woodland and Waste", Journal of Economic History 2 (May 1942): 54-62
- "The Early Pattern of the Common Law", American Historical Review 49 (1944): 199-212
