= J. Franklin Jameson =

American historian

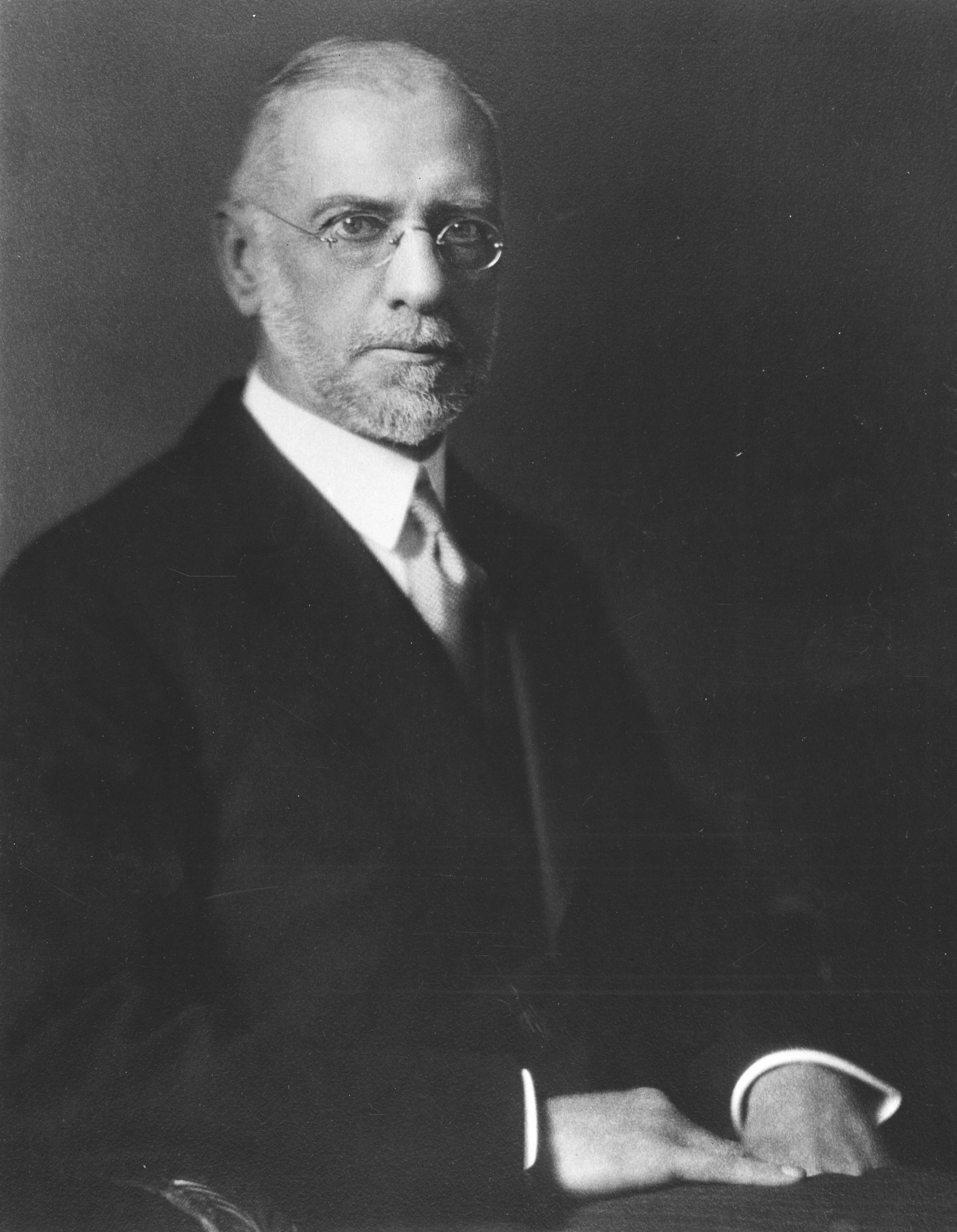
- Born: 19 September 1859; Somerville
- Died: 28 September 1937 (aged 78)
- Occupation: Editing staff

John Franklin Jameson (September 19, 1859 – September 28, 1937) was an American historian, author, and journal editor who played a major role in the professional activities of American historians in the early 20th century. He was on the faculty of Johns Hopkins University, Brown University and University of Chicago before serving as director of the Department of Historical Research of the Carnegie Institution of Washington from 1905 to 1928.

He helped establish the American Historical Association and was the first editor of the American Historical Review. He was a leading advocate for the creation of the National Archives.

== Early life ==
Jameson was born in Somerville, Massachusetts, the son of John Jameson, a schoolteacher, lawyer, and postmaster, and Mariette Thompson. He graduated from Amherst College in 1879 as class valedictorian, studying with John W. Burgess and Anson D. Morse. More influential was Herbert Baxter Adams, head of the department of history and political science at the Johns Hopkins University, where Jameson received the first doctorate in history in 1882.

He became an instructor; his dissertation The Origin and Development of the Municipal Government of New York City was published in article form in 1882. He moved to Brown University as professor in 1888. One of his judgments has since gained currency as a proverbial saying. In The History of Historical Writing in America (Boston: Houghton Mifflin and Company, 1891), Jameson remarked that the third volume of George Bancroft's History of the United States, like the first two, "continued to vote for Jackson." Subsequent versions of this saying—e.g., that "every page of Bancroft's history votes for Jackson"—may be traced to this phrasing.

He studied German, becoming proficient in the language.

== Gatekeeper ==
Jameson was a social historian, an expert in historiography, and above all an intellectual entrepreneur and gatekeeper who helped determine the priorities of the history profession in America. His base was the American Historical Association, which he helped found in 1884. He chaired its Historical Manuscripts Commission in 1895 and became the first managing editor of the American Historical Review (AHR), 1895–1901, 1905–1928, serving as information central for academic historiography. After an interlude at the University of Chicago he went to Washington in 1905 as director of the Department of Historical Research of the heavily endowed Carnegie Institution of Washington.

At the Carnegie Institution, Jameson found that decisions were largely in the hand of scientists and businessmen. He had some difficulty in conveying the importance to work on American history of archival research and bibliography. He held his position there until 1928.

He was not known for his writings, but his small book on The American Revolution Considered as a Social Movement (1926) proved influential. It expressed themes Jameson had been developing since the 1890s which reflected the "Progressive" historiography. It downplayed ideas and political values and stressed the Revolution was a fight over power among economic interest groups, especially who would rule at home.

In 1890, Jameson was elected a member of the American Antiquarian Society.

== American Historical Association ==
Jameson was the first professional historian to become the AHA president (1907). Although a number of Jameson's colleagues and friends went on to serve as AHA presidents, they also tended to refer to Jameson as "the Dean," a jocose reference to his influence within the organization. Jameson invited W.E.B. Du Bois to present a paper concerning Reconstruction at the 1909 AHA meeting, which proved controversial; no other African-American was invited to speak before the AHA until 1940.

At that time, the AHA used a system of electing a Second Vice President who ascended to the Presidency of the organization over the subsequent two years. Trouble arose in the AHA as younger men protested Jameson's authoritarianism. In 1913–1915 the insurgents, led by Frederic Bancroft, accused Jameson and an inner circle of notable historians of the time (including Frederick Jackson Turner, Andrew C. McLaughlin, George Lincoln Burr, and Charles Homer Haskins) of being undemocratic, and published a pamphlet attacking both the system of governance and the individuals. A compromise was offered by Jameson's co-editor of the AHR and incoming President, George Lincoln Burr, who refused to take office unless he were elected by the membership directly. As a result, the insurgents gained some new, more democratic rules, including the direct annual election of the President, and Burr was unanimously elected President of the AHA. Although the controversy was resolved, Jameson's reputation suffered some collateral damage.

== Carnegie Institution and Library of Congress ==
During World War I Jameson edited historical material for soldiers in their training camps, and he published articles in the AHR that supported the Allies. In 1918, he was one of two scholars who pronounced on the authenticity of the Sisson Documents that purported to demonstrate that Germany had financed the Bolshevik Revolution. Decades later George F. Kennan demonstrated the documents were forgeries and denounced Jameson for his participation despite his lack of qualifications, notably no knowledge of Russian.

At Carnegie Jameson supervised a series of documentary publications, such as guides to archival resources around the world, documentary editions of the letters of members of the Continental Congress, documents on the slave trade and slave law, and the papers of Andrew Jackson, as well as an atlas of American history. Jameson began numerous annual publications and, with Waldo Leland, started lobbying Congress to create the National Archives, the building for which was first funded in 1926. The National Archives organization was established in 1934. In 1926 he finally published an influential short book in the works for three decades, The American Revolution Considered as a Social Movement. After losing his position at Carnegie in 1928, he became head of the Division of Manuscripts at the Library of Congress, where he made some notable acquisitions of major collections. Jameson himself explained his life's work in this way:

"I struggle on making bricks without much idea of how the architects will use them, but believing that the best architect that ever was cannot get along without bricks, and therefore trying to make good ones."

== Honors and tributes ==
Jameson was elected to the American Philosophical Society in 1920.

The Library of Congress and the American Historical Association offer the J. Franklin Jameson Fellowship in American History for a semester's research in the collections of the Library of Congress for historians early in their careers.

A plaque honoring Jameson's role in establishing the National Archives was added to the Archives building in Washington, DC, in 1955.

Jameson's Carnegie Institute and Library of Congress colleague Ruth Anna Fisher edited a tribute volume along with historian William Lloyd Fox, with contributions from Verner Clapp, John Tracy Ellis, John K. Wright, Allan Nevins, and other historians.

== Selected writings ==
- Willem Usselinx: Founder of the Dutch and Swedish West India Companies (NY: G.P. Putnam's Sons, 1887)
- The History of Historical Writing in America (Boston: Houghton Mifflin and Company, 1891)
- |St. Eustatius in the American Revolution, (Oxford University Press, 1903)
- The American Revolution Considered as a Social Movement (1926)
- Elizabeth Donnan and Leo F. Stock, eds., An Historian's World: Selections from the Correspondence of John Franklin Jameson (1956)
- Rothberg, Morey and Jacqueline Goggin, eds., John Franklin Jameson and the Development of Humanistic Scholarship in America, 3 vols. (Athens GA: University of Georgia Press, 1993–2001)
- Jameson, John Franklin (1889). Essays in the constitutional history of the United States in the formative period, 1775-1789. Boston: Houghton.

=== Edited works ===
- Narratives of New Netherland, 1609–1664 (NY: Scribner's, 1909)
- Privateering and Piracy in the Colonial Period: Illustrative Documents (NY: Macmillan, 1923)

The 1965 tribute volume includes a complete bibliography of his writings.

Jameson's papers, including correspondence with other historians, are housed at the Library of Congress.

== See also ==
- Ruth Anna Fisher (archivist and co worker of Jameson at Carnegie the LOC)
- John Clement Fitzpatrick (archivist and co worker of Jameson at the LOC)
- Howard Henry Peckham (archivist of Early American history)

== Sources ==
- Higham, John. (1989). History: Professional Scholarship in America. Johns Hopkins University Press. ISBN 978-0-8018-3952-8
- Rothberg, Morey. "Jameson, John Franklin" in American National Biography Online (2000) online version
