= George Burton Adams =

American historian (1851–1925)

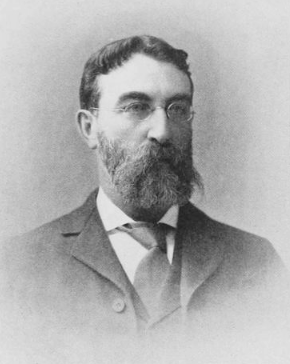
- Born: June 3, 1851; Fairfield, Vermont, U.S.
- Died: May 26, 1925 (aged 73); New Haven, Connecticut, U.S.
- Occupation: Historian

George Burton Adams (June 3, 1851 – May 26, 1925) was an American medievalist historian who taught at Yale University from 1888 to 1925.

Adams was born to on Calvin Carlton and Emeline Adams (née Nelson) on June 3, 1851, in Fairfield, Vermont. His father was a Congregational clergyman.

He was noted for his written works as well as his 1908 address as president of the American Historical Association, which lamented the encroachment of the social sciences on the field of history, a position later challenged by James Harvey Robinson. He also played a key role in the establishment of the American Historical Review. Adams was elected a member of the American Antiquarian Society in 1899, and a fellow of the American Academy of Arts and Sciences in 1918.

He died on May 26, 1925, in New Haven, Connecticut.

== Works ==
- Civilization during the Middle Ages (1894)
- Growth of the French Nation (1896)
- The History of England; From the Norman Conquest to the Death of John (1066–1216) (1905)
- The British Empire and a League of Peace (1917)
- Constitutional History of England (1921)
