= Susan Myra Kingsbury =

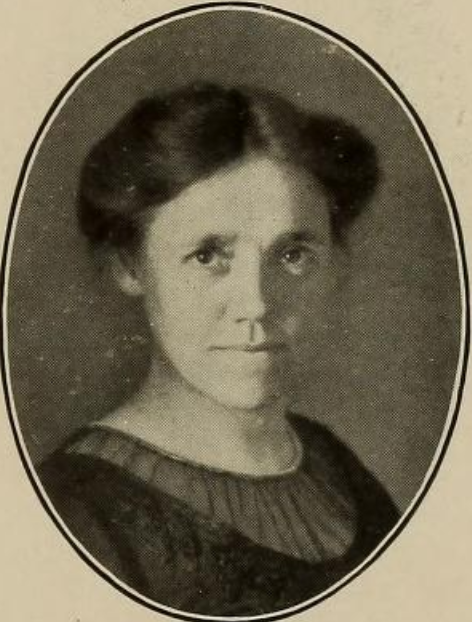
- Kingsbury in the 1913 yearbook of Simmons College
- Born: October 18, 1870; San Pablo, California
- Died: November 28, 1949 (aged 79); Bryn Mawr, Pennsylvania
- Citizenship: United States of America
- Education: College of the Pacific; Stanford University; Columbia University
- Scientific career
- Fields: History, economics, social work
- Workplaces: Bryn Mawr College
- Thesis: An Introduction to the Records of the Virginian Company of London

Susan Myra Kingsbury (October 18, 1870 – November 28, 1949) was an American professor of economics and a pioneer of social research. Kingsbury helped to establish the American Association of Schools of Social Work, and served as vice president of the American Sociological Society and American Economic Association. During her time at Bryn Mawr College, Kingsbury established courses and opportunities for women in the industrial workforce.

== Biography ==
Kingsbury was born in San Pablo, California, in 1870. She was the daughter of Willard Belmont Kingsbury, M.D., and Helen Shuler née DeLamater, M.S.A. She grew up in Stockton, California. Her father died when she was six, leaving her mother to raise Susan and her older brother Willard D. Helen was Preceptress (Dean of Women) and Professor of Modern Language and Teacher of Drawing and Painting at the College of the Pacific.

=== Education ===
Susan graduated with honors from the College of the Pacific in 1890. Her hobby was listed as "Woman's Rights" in her yearbook. From 1892 to 1900 she was a history teacher (and the first female teacher) at Lowell High School in San Francisco, while tending to her ailing mother. She graduated with an A.M. in Sociology from Stanford University in 1899, and she was part of the Phi Beta Kappa honors society. At Stanford, her master's thesis was titled The Municipal History of San Francisco to 1879.

Following the death of her mother, she moved to New York to study colonial economic history at Columbia University. During her stay in London (1903–04), she became interested in social reform. In 1904, Kingsbury taught history for a year at Vassar College. In 1905, she graduated from Columbia with a Ph.D. in history. Her dissertation was titled An Introduction to the Records of the Virginian Company of London.

=== Career ===
Kingsbury became director of investigation for the Massachusetts Commission on Industrial and Technical Education for a year beginning in 1905. The next year she accepted a position as instructor in history and economics at Simmons University, becoming head of the department. In 1906, she published the first volume of a set of works that she titled Records of the Virginian Company of London; she published the final volume in 1933. She became an associate professor in 1907. The same year she was named director of research for the Women's Educational and Industrial Union in Boston. She served as president of the New England History Teachers' Association in 1911. From 1911 to 1913, she directed a national study of the opportunities for women in social service.

Kingsbury's various publications, including Labor Laws and Their Enforcement (1911) and Economic Efficiency of College Women (1911) caught the attention of Martha Carey Thomas, president of Bryn Mawr College. In 1912, Thomas invited her to come to work at the college after listening to her give address. In 1915, Kingsbury became director of the Carola Woerishoffer Graduate Department of Social Economy and Social Research at the college. This was the first graduate department in the United States of America to train students for careers in social service.

In 1918, Kingsbury played a key role in establishing and leading a Bryn Mawr course to "prepare women for supervisor positions in industry" through training supported in part by the National Young Women's Christian Association. Kingsbury trained the women to investigate Philadelphia industrial plants with the State Department of Labor and Industry, to be employment managers, welfare superintendents, and to be "group leaders among workers of their own sex". The need for these workers arose because of changes in the composition of the workforce during the First World War.

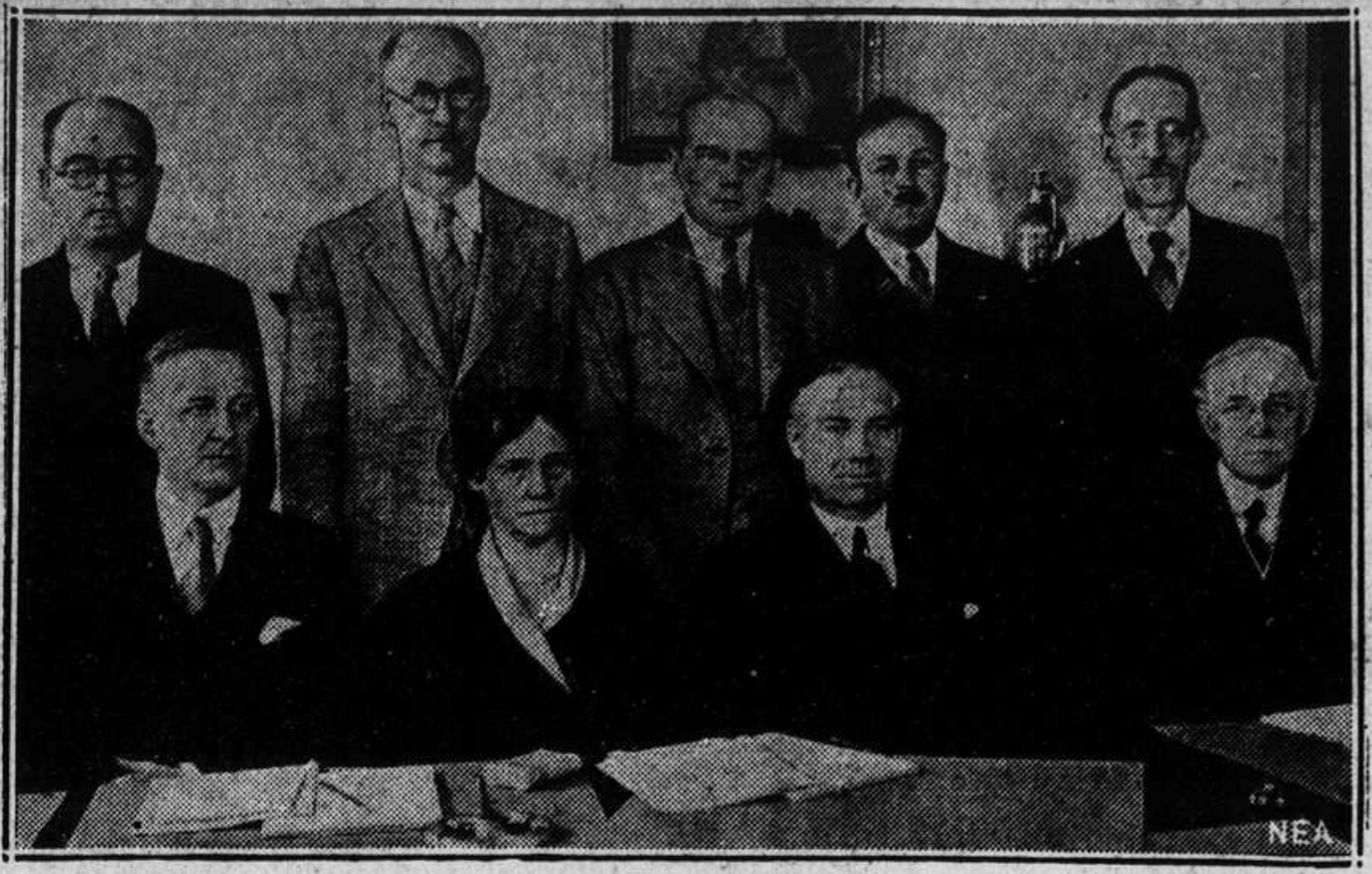
Kingsbury and the prohibition research committee in 1931

In 1919, Kingsbury helped found the American Association of Schools of Social Work. In the same year she served as vice president of the American Economic Association and the American Sociological Society. She and Thomas founded the Bryn Mawr Summer School for Women Workers in 1921. The summer school was intended "to give the working woman a chance to obtain the education which they had been unable to obtain in early life", 83 women and girls enrolled in the first edition of the summer school and it was described in contemporary reporting as "a great success".

In 1931, Prohibition Director Amos W. W. Woodcock appointed Kingsbury to a ten-person committee to investigate the consequences of prohibition. The commission focused on the impact of prohibition on "child delinquency" and the consumption of alcohol by minors. William Seal Carpenter and Samuel McCune Lindsay were members of the committee.

Kingsbury was chairman of Pennsylvania's first minimum wage board and for nearly a decade served as chairman for the American Association of University Women Committee on the Economic and Legislative Status on Women. During 1921–22, she toured China and India, then the Soviet Union in 1929–30, 1932, and 1936 to research conditions for women and children. She published findings from her visits to Russia in 1935.

She retired as professor emeritus of social economy at Bryn Mawr College in 1936. Kingsbury died at Bryn Mawr on November 28, 1949, at the age of 78 after being ill for several weeks. A brief obituary published at the time described her as "internationally known as a champion of women's rights".

== Bibliography ==
Her published works include:

- Kingsbury, Susan Myra, ed. (1906), The records of the Virginia Company of London, vol. 1, US Government Printing Office.
- Kingsbury, Susan Myra (1908), A comparison of the Virginia company with the other English trading companies of the sixteenth and seventeenth centuries, American Historical Association.
- Department of Research; Perkins, Agnes Frances; Martin, Eleanor; Post, Margaret A.; Kingsbury, Susan Myra (1910), Vocations for the trained woman, Boston, Massachusetts: Women's Educational and Industrial Union.
- Kingsbury, Susan (February 1910), "Economic Efficiency of College Women", Journal of the Association of Collegiate Alumnae, 3 (20): 1–11.
- Kingsbury, Susan Myra, ed. (1911), Labor Laws and Their Enforcement: with Special Reference to Massachusetts, Studies in economic relations of women, vol. 1, Longmans, Green.
- Kingsbury, Susan M.; Moses, Mabelle (1915), Licensed workers in industrial home work in Massachusetts : analysis of current records under the auspices of the Bureau of Research, Women's Educational and Industrial Union, Boston: Wright & Potter, state printers.
- Kingsbury, Susan M.; et al. (October 1915), "The boot and shoe industry in Massachusetts as a vocation for women", Bulletin of the United States Bureau of Labor Statistics, Women in Industry Series, 180 (7): 105.
- Francke, Marie (April 1917), "Opportunities for Women in Domestic Science", Monthly Review of the U.S. Bureau of Labor Statistics, 4 (4), under the direction of Susan Myra Kingsbury: 570–572, JSTOR 41823374.
- Kingsbury, Susan Myra; et al. (1917), Industrial experience of trade-school girls in Massachusetts, Economic Relations of Women, vol. 9, Women's Educational and Industrial Union.
- Kingsbury, Susan Myra; Fairchild, Mildred (1932), Employment and unemployment in pre-war and Soviet Russia.
- Kingsbury, Susan M.; Fairchild, Mildred (1935), Factory, Family and Women in the Soviet Union, G. P. Putnam's Sons.
- Kingsbury, Susan Myra; Hart, Hornell (1937), Newspapers and the news: an objective measurement of ethical and unethical behavior by representative newspapers, vol. 1, GP Putnam's sons.
- Kingsbury, Susan Myra (1939), "Economic status of university women in the USA", Report of the Committee on Economic and Legal Status of Women, American Association of University Women in cooperation with the Women's Bureau, United States Department of Labor, vol. 170, US Government Printing Office.
- Kingsbury, Susan Myra; Frances, Speek (1942), Women on governing boards: a cooperative study of women on governing boards and in administrative posts in local, state and national organizations, public and private, composed of both men and women., Branch, State, and National Committees on Economic and Legal Status of Women, American Association of University Women.
