= Ruth Anna Fisher =

American historian

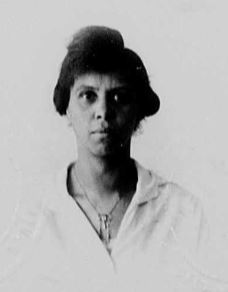
- 1920
- Born: March 15, 1886; Lorain, Ohio
- Died: January 28, 1975
- Education: Oberlin College (A.B. 1906)
- Occupation(s): Archivist and historian

Ruth Anna Fisher (March 15, 1886 – January 28, 1975) was an American historian, archivist, and teacher who played a major role in collecting sources from British archives for the Carnegie Institution and Library of Congress.

== Early life ==
Fisher was born in Lorain, Ohio, the daughter of David C. Fisher, a real estate investor and ice merchant, and Elizabeth Dorsey. She graduated from Oberlin College in 1906 and was offered a position at the Tuskegee Institute. Within a few months, however, she had a falling out with Booker T. Washington over matters of pedagogy and the school's requirement that she be involved in the Sunday School.

After leaving Tuskegee, Fisher taught in the Lorain and Indianapolis, Indiana, schools and at the Manassas Industrial School for Colored Youth in Manassas, Virginia, studied at the Canadian Academy of Music in Toronto, and was in charge of the recreational center of a YWCA in New York City. Her work at the YWCA put her in contact with organizer Eva Del Vakia Bowles, and in the YWCA canteen, contact with soldiers returning from the French World War I battlefields underscored her awareness of the differences between the Black experience in the U.S. and that in Europe. When a benefactor offered to pay for a year of study abroad, Fisher chose the London School of Economics and made her way there in 1920.

== Archivist and historian ==
While in London, Fisher met with historian J. Franklin Jameson, who was researching documents connected with American history for the Carnegie Institution. Jameson described her to fellow historian Waldo Gifford Leland in positive terms, saying that she had "the proper delicacy about the color line ... but highly intelligent and educated negroes have so hard a pathway in America. I want [her] to have what pleasure she can in Europe." Jameson was to support her throughout her career, even raising $2,500 so that she could pursue training as an opera singer. (Although she received a scholarship to study music in London in 1931–32, her musical ambitions were cut short by a goiter operation.) After Jameson's death in 1965, Fisher edited a volume of tributes from his fellow historians and wrote one of the selections.

At first, Fisher worked on Carnegie projects for Jameson and people he referred to her. In 1927, she joined the Library of Congress to supervise the copying of American history materials in British repositories, a project that generated as many as 100,000 pages a year after photographic reproduction became the norm. She believed she was the only foreign woman to have her own key at the British Museum. She returned to the United States in 1940 after her apartment was bombed during a raid on London. She resumed her research in England in 1949.

The concluding years of her Library of Congress career, from 1952 until her retirement in 1956, were spent in Washington, DC. By then, she felt that the efforts in London had "about broken the back of the manuscripts material relating to our history to be found in England" although she expected new revelations still to pop up occasionally from public figures' own holdings.

Fisher's name appears in the acknowledgements of the publications of contemporary historians, who found invaluable her ability to locate obscure documents. Of particular note was her finding of the original copy of the secret convention that Toussaint Louverture signed with British general Thomas Maitland (British Army officer) on August 31, 1798, lifting the British blockade on Saint-Domingue in exchange for a promise that Louverture would not export the Haitian Revolution to the British colony of Jamaica.

== World War II years ==
Fisher had been in London for some two decades when World War II broke out. The London bombing that left her homeless also destroyed almost all of her possessions. The only personal item that remained to her was a small book of maxims.

Back in the U.S., she found Washington very different from London, writing to her friend W.E.B. Du Bois:

I hate Washington with an intense hatred.... I see no difference between the Japanese and Prussian military caste and the Southern oligarchy here. They are all convinced of their race superiority, and they control the army and navy. The Ku Klux Klan is like the Storm Troopers. And all of these groups want to make their opinions the predominant and powerful ones in their respective countries and the world with all else subservient to them. It further seems as likely for a Hitler to arise here in these circumstances as in Germany.

She retained strong connections to her friends in the U.K. and contributed some of the impressions from their letters to Du Bois' new journal Phylon.

== Social awareness ==
Although her chief impact was as a researcher rather than an organizer or activist, Fisher had a keen awareness of racial issues from an early age and was connected with many of those working for civil rights and for opportunities for Black Americans. In 1915, in her hometown of Lorain, she spoke out against plans to show "The Mystery of Morrow's Rest" (previously titled "The Nigger"), a film about miscegenation based on a play by Edward Sheldon. She carried on a cordial and sometimes even playful correspondence with Du Bois for five decades.

She attended the 2nd Pan-African Congress in London in 1921. Fisher also was active in the Association for the Study of Negro Life and History and spoke at its 1941 meeting in Columbus, Ohio.

Reflecting in 1941 on the causes of World War II, she observed that the level of popular dissatisfaction that could give rise to Hitler was not confined to Germany:

And this discontent and dissatisfaction growing over the whole world has arisen because the ordinary man and woman is no longer willing to starve, nor to work to build up riches for her country and nation unless he is given his rightful share of those riches. His demand is really simple, that the principles of democracy be put into practise for him.

At age 77, Fisher participated in the March on Washington for Jobs and Freedom on August 28, 1963.

== Selected writings ==
- Extracts from the Records of the African Companies (Washington, DC: Association for the Study of Negro Life and History, 1930)
- 'Legend of the Blue Jay' in Musser, Judith, ed., "Girl, colored" and Other Stories : A Complete Short Fiction Anthology of African American Women Writers in The Crisis Magazine, 1910-2010 (Jefferson, NC: McFarland & Co., 2011)

=== Edited works ===
- J. Franklin Jameson: A Tribute (Washington, DC: Catholic University of America Press, 1965)

Fisher's personal papers are held by the Manuscripts Division of the Library of Congress.

== Sources ==
- "Ruth Anna Fisher, 88, Authority on History". The Washington Post: C4. 31 January 1975.
