= Barbara Weinstein (historian) =

American historian

Barbara Weinstein (born 1952) is a professor of Latin American and Caribbean history at New York University. Her research interests include race, gender, labor, and political economy, especially in relation to the making of modern Brazil.

== Early life ==
Weinstein earned her undergraduate degree from Princeton University and her PhD from Yale University.

== Career ==
Weinstein undertook postdoctoral fellowships from the National Endowment for the Humanities and the Fulbright Program. In 1998, she was awarded a Guggenheim Fellowship. In 2000, Weinstein joined the history faculty at the University of Maryland. There, she was director for the Center for Historical Studies at UMD and was senior editor for Hispanic American Historical Review. In 2007 Weinstein was president of the American Historical Association, and in 2010–2011 she was a fellow at the Radcliffe Institute for Advanced Study at Harvard University.

=== Research ===
Weinstein has extensively studied the post-colonial roots of Brazil, particularly the progressive São Paulo region, racial identity, and wealth inequality. The São Paulo region first came to prosperity during the coffee boom of the mid-nineteenth century; the coffee plantations were initially worked by African and creole slaves, and later through the subsidized immigration of white European laborers. She describes the process by which the predominantly white upper class in the 1920s created a foundational myth for the success of the region, linking their culture to the enterprising spirit of the bandeirantes and the progressive attitudes of the abolitionists. The cultural identity of the region was as "the shiny, modern engine pulling the nation forward", with the non-white indigenous peoples and former slaves relegated to the wayside of history. She notes the modern economic prominence of the region as an industrial center on the global scale as a contrast to its past as a labor-intensive agricultural economy, addressing the continued geographic wealth disparity from a neo-developmentalist standpoint.

=== Academic freedom ===
In her inaugural address to the American Historical Association, Weinstein was sharply critical of post-9/11 changes to US entrance visa policies. She argued that increased barriers to foreign scholars to participate in workshops and conferences and accept positions in the United States represented a threat to academic freedom. She presented the cases of Waskar Ari, a recent graduate of Georgetown University who had been visiting family in Bolivia before joining the faculty at the University of Nebraska at Lincoln, and of Tariq Ramadan, a Swiss Islamic scholar who had been offered a position at the University of Notre Dame. Neither scholar's visa was approved. She argued that excluding historians with direct experience in rapidly changing areas was counterproductive from a security standpoint. Ari's visa was approved after two years.

== Publications ==
=== Books ===
- Weinstein, Barbara (1983). The Amazon Rubber Boom, 1850–1920. Stanford University Press. ISBN 978-0-8047-1168-5.
- Weinstein, Barbara (1996). For Social Peace in Brazil: Industrialists and the Remaking of the Working Class in São Paulo, 1920–1964. University of North Carolina Press. ISBN 978-0-8078-4602-5.
- Weinstein, Barbara (2015). The Color of Modernity: São Paulo and the Making of Race and Nation in Brazil. Duke University Press.

=== Selected articles ===
- Weinstein, Barbara (1997). "Unskilled Worker, Skilled Housewife: Constructing the Working-Class Woman in São Paulo, Brazil". In John D. French; Daniel James (eds.). The gendered worlds of Latin American women workers: from household and factory to the union hall and ballot box. Duke University Press. ISBN 978-0-8223-1996-2.
- Weinstein, Barbara (April 2001). "Buddy, Can You Spare a Paradigm?: Reflections on Generational Shifts and Latin American History". The Americas. 57 (4): 453–466. doi:10.1353/tam.2001.0055. JSTOR 1007829. S2CID 143476276.
- Weinstein, Barbara (2003). "Racializing Regional Difference: São Paulo vs. Brazil, 1932,"". In Nancy P. Appelbaum; Anne S. Macpherson; Karin Alejandra Rosemblatt (eds.). Race and nation in modern Latin America. University of North Carolina Press. ISBN 978-0-8078-5441-9.
- Weinstein, Barbara (2005). "History Without a Cause? Grand Narratives, World History, and the Postcolonial Dilemma". International Review of Social History. 50: 71–93. doi:10.1017/S0020859004001865.
- Weinstein, Barbara (Spring 2006). "Inventing the "Mulher Paulista": Politics, Rebellion, and the Gendering of Brazilian Regional Identities". Journal of Women's History. 18 (1): 22–49. doi:10.1353/jowh.2006.0028. S2CID 144223316.
- Weinstein, Barbara (April 2007). "Let the Sunshine In: Government Records and National Insecurities". Perspectives. Article arguing the benefits of increased public scrutiny of government records.
- Weinstein, Barbara (February 2008). "Developing Inequality". American Historical Review. 113 (1): 1–18. doi:10.1086/ahr.113.1.1.
- Weinstein, Barbara (2010). "Postcolonial Brazil". In Joseph C. Moya (ed.). The Oxford Handbook of Latin American History. Oxford University Press. ISBN 978-0-19-516621-7.
- López, A. Ricardo; Barbara Weinstein, eds. (2012). The Making of the Middle Class: Toward a Transnational History. Duke University Press. ISBN 978-0-8223-5129-0.
