= Nicholas M. Pette =

American politician

Nicholas M. Pette (November 29, 1891 in Brooklyn, Kings County, New York – December 26, 1988 in Manhattan, New York City) was an American lawyer and politician from New York.

== Life ==
He was the son of Michael Pette (died 1952). He attended schools in Jamaica, Queens and Strasbourg, France. He married Gertrude Lott (died 1943), and they had one daughter: Janet Lott (Pette) Kujan.

Pette was a member of the New York State Assembly (Queens Co., 4th D.) in 1920 and 1921.

He was a U.S. Commissioner (i.e. a federal magistrate appointed by the United States District Court for the Eastern District of New York to help with the enforcement of the Volstead Act) until 1931; and a judge of the Queens Municipal Court from 1932 to 1950.

He was a justice of the New York Supreme Court (10th D.) from 1950 to 1961, and sat in the Appellate Division (2nd Dpt.) from 1959 until the end of 1961, when he reached the constitutional age limit. He was an Official Referee (i.e. a senior judge on an additional seat) of the Supreme Court from 1962 to 1966.

In 1957, he married Ruth (Hagen) Carney (1910–2002).

He died on December 26, 1988, in St. Vincent's Hospital in Manhattan, of a bleeding ulcer.

== Sources ==
- New York Red Book (1920; pg. 198) [The Red Book states as birth date "November 29, 1890", but Justice Pette would thus have reached the constitutional age limit at the end of 1960. As he sat on the Appellate Division during 1961, he should have been born in 1891.]
- FEDERAL JUDGES NAME VISEL A COMMISSIONER; Former Aide to Queens Prosecutor Succeeds Pette, Who Was Elected a Municipal Court Justice in NYT on December 20, 1931 (subscription required)
- Nicholas M. Pette, Judge, 97 in NYT on December 28, 1988
- Nicholas M. Pette at New York Courts
- Paid Obituaries; PETTE, Ruth Carney in the SunSentinel, of Fort Lauderdale, Florida, on January 15, 2002

New York State Assembly
| Preceded by Frank E. Hopkins | New York State Assembly; Queens County, 4th District; 1920–1921 | Succeeded by Joseph H. S. Thomas |
