= Tyler Stovall =

American academic and historian (1954–2021)

- Born: Tyler Edward Stovall; April 9, 1954; Gallipolis, Ohio, U.S.
- Died: December 11, 2021 (aged 67); New York City, U.S.
- Occupations: Professor; Historian

Tyler Edward Stovall (April 9, 1954 – December 11, 2021) was an American academic and historian. He served as president of the American Historical Association in 2017.

== Biography ==
For me, history is the record not only of how things change, but how people make things change, how they act individually and collectively to create a better world.

Stovall earned a degree in history from Harvard University in 1976. He earned a master's degree in 1978 at the University of Wisconsin–Madison, where he also earned a doctorate in 1984 with a thesis that eventually was published as a book called The rise of the Paris Red Belt. He served as a high school teacher in 1978 before teaching at the University of Wisconsin–Milwaukee, the University of California, Berkeley, and Ohio State University. He then served as a professor and Dean of Humanities for the University of California, Santa Cruz before returning to Berkeley. His last position was Dean of the Graduate School of Arts and Sciences at Fordham University.

Stovall's studies specialized in the history of French suburbs, urban immigration, and post-colonial and transnational history.

Stovall died in New York City on December 11, 2021, at the age of 67.

== Publications ==
- The rise of the Paris Red Belt (1990)
- France since the Second World War (2002)
- Paris and the Spirit of 1919: Consumer Struggles, Transnationalism, and Revolution (2012)
- Paris Noir: African Americans in the City of Light (2012)
- Transnational France: the Modern History of a Universal Nation (2015)
- White Freedom: The Racial History of an Idea (2021)
