= American Historical Association =

Society of historians, founded 1884

- Abbreviation: AHA
- Formation: 1884; 142 years ago
- Headquarters: 400 A St. SE Washington, D.C., U.S.
- President: Lonnie Bunch (2026)
- Affiliations: American Council of Learned Societies
- Website: www.historians.org

The American Historical Association (AHA) is the oldest professional association of historians in the United States and the largest such organization in the world with 11,000 members as of 2025. Founded in 1884, AHA works to protect academic freedom, develop professional standards, and support scholarship and innovative teaching. It publishes The American Historical Review four times annually, which features scholarly history-related articles and book reviews.

AHA is the major learned society for historians working in the United States, while the Organization of American Historians is a field society for historians who study and teach about the United States. The AHA's congressional charter of 1889, established it "for the promotion of historical studies, the collection and preservation of historical manuscripts, and for kindred purposes in the interest of American history, and of history in America."

== Activities ==
AHA operates as an umbrella organization for the discipline of history, and works with other major historical organizations and acts as a public advocate for the field. Within the profession, the association defines ethical behavior and best practices, particularly through its "Statement on Standards of Professional Conduct". AHA also develops standards for good practice in teaching and history textbooks.

The AHA publishes The American Historical Review, a major journal of history scholarship covering all historical topics since ancient history and Perspectives on History, the monthly news magazine of the profession. In 2006 the AHA started a blog focused on the latest happenings in the broad discipline of history and the professional practice of the craft that draws on the staff, research, and activities of the AHA.

The association's annual meeting each January brings together more than 5,000 historians from around the United States to discuss the latest research and discuss how to be better historians and teachers. Many affiliated historical societies hold their annual meetings simultaneously. The association's web site offers extensive information on the current state of the profession, tips on history careers, and an extensive archive of historical materials (including the G.I. Roundtable series), a series of pamphlets prepared for the War Department in World War II.

The AHA also administers two major fellowships, 24 book prizes, and a number of small research grants.

The association elects a president to serve a one-year term; the president for 2026 is Lonnie Bunch.

== History ==
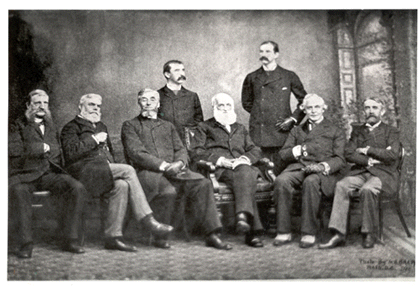
Executive officers of the American Historical Association at the time of the association's incorporation by the U.S. Congress photographed during their annual meeting on December 30, 1889, in Washington, D.C. Seated (left to right) are: William Poole, Justin Winsor, Charles Kendall Adams (President), George Bancroft, John Jay, and Andrew Dickson White, Standing (left to right) are: Herbert B. Adams and Clarence Winthrop Bowen

The American Historical Association was founded in 1884 with the constitution stating "its object shall be the promotion of historical studies." In 1889, AHA was incorporated by act of Congress. Co-founder J. Franklin Jameson, also inaugural director of the Carnegie Institution of Washington's Department of Historical Research, aimed to professionalize American history and elevate historians in political statecraft.

The early leaders of the association were mostly gentlemen with the leisure and means to write many of the great 19th-century works of history, such as George Bancroft, Justin Winsor, and James Ford Rhodes. However, as former AHA president James J. Sheehan points out, the association always tried to serve multiple constituencies, "including archivists, members of state and local historical societies, teachers, and amateur historians, who looked to it – and not always with success or satisfaction – for representation and support."

=== Women and African Americans ===
According to the Association,

Women and minorities were officially accepted into the Association from the beginning, but enjoyed little or no representation at the Association’s meetings and in the governing structure. No African Americans were represented on the AHA governing Council until 1959, and it would be another 20 years before John Hope Franklin was elected president of the AHA. Similarly, only 15 women served on the AHA Council before 1971 (out of over 186 members), and in the Association’s first 100 years only one woman, Nellie Neilson, had been elected to the presidency [in 1943]. By 1973 an assistant executive secretary had been appointed for the specific purpose of dealing with such problems.

Thavolia Glymph was elected president of the AHA for the term beginning in 2024. The 140th president, she is the first Black woman to hold that post.

=== Publication standards ===
From its founding, the association was largely managed by historians employed at colleges and universities, and served a critical role in defining their interests as a profession. The association's first president, Andrew Dickson White, was president of Cornell University, and its first secretary, Herbert Baxter Adams, established one of the first history Ph.D. programs to follow the new German seminary method at Johns Hopkins University. The clearest expression of this academic impulse in history came in the development of the American Historical Review in 1895. Formed by historians at a number of the most important universities in the United States, it followed the model of European history journals. Under the early editorship of J. Franklin Jameson, the Review published several long scholarly articles every issue, only after they had been vetted by scholars and approved by the editor. Each issue also reviewed a number of history books for their conformity to the new professional norms and scholarly standards that were taught at leading graduate schools to Ph.D. candidates. From the AHR, Sheehan concludes, "a junior scholar learned what it meant to be a historian of a certain sort".

=== AHA and public history ===
Meringolo (2004) compares academic and public history. Unlike academic history, public history is typically a collaborative effort, does not necessarily rely on primary research, is more democratic in participation, and does not aspire to absolute "scientific" objectivity. Historical museums, documentary editing, heritage movements and historical preservation are considered public history. Though activities now associated with public history originated in the AHA, these activities separated out in the 1930s due to differences in methodology, focus, and purpose. The foundations of public history were laid on the middle ground between academic history and the public audience by National Park Service administrators during the 1920s–30s.

The academicians insisted on a perspective that looked beyond particular localities to a larger national and international perspective, and that in practice it should be done along modern and scientific lines. To that end, the association actively promoted excellence in the areas of research, the association published a series of annual reports through the Smithsonian Institution and adopted The American Historical Review in 1898 to provide early outlets for this new brand of professional scholarship.

=== Establishing a national history curriculum ===
In 1896, the association appointed a "Committee of Seven" to develop a national standard for college admission requirements in the field of history. Before this time, individual colleges defined their own entrance requirements. After substantial surveys of prevailing teaching methods, emphases and curricula in secondary schools, the Committee published "The Study of History in Schools" in 1898. Their report largely defined the way history would be taught at the high school level as a preparation for college, and wrestled with issues about how the field should relate to the other social studies. The Committee recommended four blocks of Western history, to be taught in chronological order—ancient, medieval and modern European, English, and American history and civil government—and advised that teachers "tell a story" and "bring out dramatic aspects" to make history come alive.

[T]he student who is taught to consider political subjects in school, who is led to look at matters historically, has some mental equipment for a comprehension of the political and social problems that will confront him in everyday life, and has received practical preparation for social adaptation and for forceful participation in civic activities.... The pupil should see the growth of the institutions which surround him; he should see the work of men; he should study the living concrete facts of the past; he should know of nations that have risen and fallen; he should see tyranny, vulgarity, greed, benevolence, patriotism, self-sacrifice, brought out in the lives and works of men. So strongly has this very thought taken hold of writers of civil government, that they no longer content themselves with a description of the government as it is, but describe at considerable length the origin and development of the institutions of which they speak.

The association also played a decisive role in lobbying the federal government to preserve and protect its own documents and records. After extensive lobbying by AHA Secretary Waldo Leland and Jameson, Congress established the National Archives and Records Administration in 1934.

As the interests of historians in colleges and universities gained prominence in the association, other areas and activities tended to fall by the wayside. The Manuscripts and Public Archives Commissions were abandoned in the 1930s, while projects related to original research and the publication of scholarship gained ever-greater prominence.

=== Professional misconduct ===
The association started to investigate cases of professional misconduct in 1987, but ceased the effort in 2005 "because it has proven to be ineffective for responding to misconduct in the historical profession."

=== Resolutions ===
In 1982, AHA passed a resolution introduced by Gordon A. Craig of the Conference on Peace Research calling for nuclear disarmament.

In 2007, the group Historians for Peace and Democracy presented a resolution against the Iraq War, which passed under president Barbara Weinstein.

At the 2025 annual meeting, AHA members passed a resolution condemning alleged scholasticide in the Gaza war by a 428-to-88 vote. Association elected council vetoed the resolution. The American Jewish Committee (AJC) and the Academic Engagement Network (AEN) criticized the proposed resolution as a "misguided resolution, which grossly undermines the rules of causal inference to advance a near-obsessive anti-Israel narrative that casts the Jewish state as a uniquely malevolent aggressor." Likewise the Anti-Defamation League (ADL) condemned the resolution, accusing the AHA of "framing [that] perpetuates harmful biases and reinforces narratives that marginalize Jewish voices".

== Selected awards ==
For publications

- Herbert Baxter Adams Prize for the best book in European history
- George Louis Beer Prize for the best book in European international history since 1895
- Jerry Bentley Prize for the most outstanding book on world history
- Albert J. Beveridge Award in American history for a distinguished book on the history of the United States, Latin America, or Canada, from 1492 to the present
- Paul Birdsall Prize for a major book on European military and strategic history since 1870
- James Henry Breasted Prize for the best book in any field of history prior to AD 1000
- John H. Dunning Prize for the most outstanding book on US history
- John K. Fairbank Prize for the best book on East Asian history since 1800
- Morris D. Forkosch Prize for the best book in the field of British history since 1485
- Leo Gershoy Award for the best book in the fields of 17th and 18th-century western European history
- Friedrich Katz Prize for the best book in Latin American and Caribbean history
- Eugenia M. Palmegiano Prize in the history of journalism
- James A. Rawley Prize for the best book that explores the integration of Atlantic worlds before the 20th century

For professional distinction

- James Harvey Robinson Prize for the teaching aid that has made the most outstanding contribution to the teaching and learning of history in any field
- Herbert Feis Award for distinguished contributions to public history
- Award for Scholarly Distinction to senior historians for lifetime achievement
- Martin A. Klein Prize (Martin A. Klein) instituted in his name for the most distinguished work of scholarship on African history published in English during the previous calendar year
- The Nancy Lyman Roelker Mentorship Award

== Past presidents ==
Presidents of the AHA are elected annually and give a president's address at the annual meeting:

- Andrew Dickson White (1884, 1885)
- George Bancroft (1886)
- Justin Winsor (1887)
- William Frederick Poole (1888)
- Charles Kendall Adams (1889)
- John Jay (1890)
- William Wirt Henry (1891)
- James Burrill Angell (1892–1893)
- Henry Adams (1893–1894)
- George F. Hoar (1895)
- Richard Salter Storrs (1896)
- James Schouler (1897)
- George Park Fisher (1898)
- James Ford Rhodes (1899)
- Edward Eggleston (1900)
- Charles Francis Adams Jr. (1901)
- Alfred Thayer Mahan (1902)
- Henry Charles Lea (1903)
- Goldwin Smith (1904)
- John Bach McMaster (1905)
- Simeon E. Baldwin (1906)
- J. Franklin Jameson (1907)
- George Burton Adams (1908)
- Albert Bushnell Hart (1909)
- Frederick Jackson Turner (1910)
- William Milligan Sloane (1911)
- Theodore Roosevelt (1912)
- William Archibald Dunning (1913)
- Andrew C. McLaughlin (1914)
- H. Morse Stephens (1915)
- George Lincoln Burr (1916)
- Worthington C. Ford (1917)
- William Roscoe Thayer (1918–1919)
- Edward Channing (1920)
- Jean Jules Jusserand (1921)
- Charles Homer Haskins (1922)
- Edward Potts Cheyney (1923)
- Woodrow Wilson (1924, died)
- Charles McLean Andrews (1924, 1925)
- Dana Carleton Munro (1926)
- Henry Osborn Taylor (1927)
- James Henry Breasted (1928)
- James Harvey Robinson (1929)
- Evarts Boutell Greene (1930)
- Carl L. Becker (1931)
- Herbert Eugene Bolton (1932)
- Charles A. Beard (1933)
- William E. Dodd (1934)
- Michael Rostovtzeff (1935)
- Charles Howard McIlwain (1936)
- Guy Stanton Ford (1937)
- Laurence M. Larson (1938)
- William Scott Ferguson (1939)
- Max Farrand (1940)
- James Westfall Thompson (1941)
- Arthur M. Schlesinger Sr. (1942)
- Nellie Neilson (1943, first female president)
- William Linn Westermann (1944)
- Carlton J. H. Hayes (1945)
- Sidney Bradshaw Fay (1946)
- Thomas J. Wertenbaker (1947)
- Kenneth Scott Latourette (1948)
- Conyers Read (1949)
- Samuel Eliot Morison (1950)
- Robert Livingston Schuyler (1951)
- James G. Randall (1952)
- Louis R. Gottschalk (1953)
- Merle Curti (1954)
- Lynn Thorndike (1955)
- Dexter Perkins (1956)
- William L. Langer (1957)
- Walter Prescott Webb (1958)
- Allan Nevins (1959)
- Bernadotte Everly Schmitt (1960)
- Samuel Flagg Bemis (1961)
- Carl Bridenbaugh (1962)
- Crane Brinton (1963)
- Julian P. Boyd (1964)
- Frederic C. Lane (1965)
- Roy Franklin Nichols (1966)
- Hajo Holborn (1967)
- John King Fairbank (1968)
- C. Vann Woodward (1969)
- Robert Roswell Palmer (1970)
- David M. Potter (1971, died)
- Joseph Strayer (1971)
- Thomas C. Cochran (1972)
- Lynn Townsend White Jr. (1973)
- Lewis Hanke (1974)
- Gordon Wright (1975)
- Richard B. Morris (1976)
- Charles Gibson (1977)
- William J. Bouwsma (1978)
- John Hope Franklin (1979)
- David H. Pinkney (1980)
- Bernard Bailyn (1981)
- Gordon A. Craig (1982)
- Philip D. Curtin (1983)
- Arthur S. Link (1984)
- William H. McNeill (1985)
- Carl N. Degler (1986)
- Natalie Zemon Davis (1987)
- Akira Iriye (1988)
- Louis R. Harlan (1989)
- David Herlihy (1990)
- William Leuchtenburg (1991)
- Frederic E. Wakeman Jr (1992)
- Louise A. Tilly (1993)
- Thomas C. Holt (1994)
- John Henry Coatsworth (1995)
- Caroline Walker Bynum (1996)
- Joyce Appleby (1997)
- Joseph C. Miller (1998)
- Robert Darnton (1999)
- Eric Foner (2000)
- Wm. Roger Louis (2001)
- Lynn Hunt (2002)
- James M. McPherson (2003)
- Jonathan D. Spence (2004)
- James J. Sheehan (2005)
- Linda K. Kerber (2006)
- Barbara Weinstein (2007)
- Gabrielle M. Spiegel (2008)
- Laurel Thatcher Ulrich (2009)
- Barbara D. Metcalf (2010)
- Anthony Grafton (2011)
- William Cronon (2012)
- Kenneth Pomeranz (2013)
- Jan E. Goldstein (2014)
- Vicki L. Ruiz (2015)
- Patrick Manning (2016)
- Tyler Stovall (2017)
- Mary Beth Norton (2018)
- J. R. McNeill (2019)
- Mary Lindemann (2020)
- Jacqueline Jones (2021)
- James H. Sweet (2022)
- Edward Muir (2023)
- Thavolia Glymph (2024)
- Ben Vinson III (2025)

== See also ==
- Bibliographical Society of America
- List of American historians
- Organization of American Historians

== Selected bibliography ==
- Andrews, Charles M. (1925). "These Forty Years". The American Historical Review. 30 (2): 225–250.
- Alonso, Harriet Hyman. " Slammin' at the AHA." Rethinking History 2001 5(3): 441–446. ISSN 1364-2529 Fulltext in Ingenta and Ebsco. The theme of the 2001 annual meeting of the AHA, "Practices of Historical Narrative", attracted a variety of panels. The article traces one such panel from its conception to presentation. Taking the theme to heart, the panelists created a "slam" (or reading) of narrative histories written by experienced historians, a graduate student, and an undergraduate student, and then opened the session to readings from the audience.
- American Historical Association Committee on Graduate Education. "We Historians: the Golden Age and Beyond." Perspectives 2003 41(5): 18–22. ISSN 0743-7021 Surveys the state of the history profession in 2003 and points out that numerous career options exist for persons with a Ph.D. in history, although the traditional ideal of a university-level appointment for new Ph.D.s remains the primary goal of doctoral programs.
- Bender, Thomas, Katz, Philip; Palmer, Colin; and American Historical Association Committee on Graduate Education. The Education of Historians for the Twenty-First Century. U. of Illinois Press, 2004. 222 pp.
- Elizabeth Donnan and Leo F. Stock, eds. An Historian's World: Selections from the Correspondence of John Franklin Jameson, (1956). Jameson was AHR editor 1895–1901, 1905–1928
- Higham, John. History: Professional Scholarship in America. (1965, 2nd ed. 1989). ISBN 978-0-8018-3952-8
- Meringolo, Denise D. "Capturing the Public Imagination: the Social and Professional Place of Public History." American Studies International 2004 42(2–3): 86–117. ISSN 0883-105X Fulltext in Ebsco.
- Morey Rothberg and Jacqueline Goggin, eds., John Franklin Jameson and the Development of Humanistic Scholarship in America (3 vols., 1993–2001). ISBN 978-0-8203-1446-4
- Novick, Peter. That Noble Dream: The "Objectivity Question" and the American Historical Profession. Cambridge University Press, 1988. ISBN 978-0-521-35745-6
- Orrill, Robert and Shapiro, Linn. "From Bold Beginnings to an Uncertain Future: the Discipline of History and History Education." American Historical Review 2005 110(3): 727–751. ISSN 0002-8762 Fulltext in History Cooperative, University of Chicago Press and Ebsco. In challenging the reluctance of historians to join the national debate over teaching history in the schools, the authors argue that historians should remember the leading role that the profession once played in the making of school history. The AHA invented school history in the early 20th century and remained at the forefront of K–12 policymaking until just prior to World War II. However, it abandoned its long-standing activist stance and allowed school history to be submerged within the ill-defined, antidisciplinary domain of "social studies."
- Sheehan, James J. "The AHA and its Publics - Part I." Perspectives 2005 43(2): 5–7. ISSN 0743-7021
- Stearns, Peter N.; Seixas, Peter; and Wineburg, Sam, ed. Knowing, Teaching, and Learning History. New York U. Press, 2000. 576 pp. ISBN 978-0-8147-8142-5
- Townsend, Robert B. History's Babel: Scholarship, Professionalization, and the Historical Enterprise in the United States, 1880–1940. University Of Chicago Press, 2013. ISBN 978-0-226-92393-2
- Tyrrell, Ian. Historians in Public: The Practice of American History, 1890–1970. University of Chicago Press, 2005. ISBN 978-0-226-82194-8
