= Cornelius Loos =

16th century Roman Catholic priest and theologian

Cornelius Loos (1546 – 3 February 1595), also known as Cornelius Losaeus Callidius, was a Roman Catholic priest, theologian, and professor of theology. He was the first Catholic official to write publicly against the witch trials raging throughout Europe from the 1580s to the 1590s. For this, he was imprisoned and forced to recant; his work was confiscated and suppressed by church officials. His manuscript was lost for almost 300 years. It was discovered in the Jesuit Library of Trier in 1886 by an American historian, George Lincoln Burr.

== Life ==
Cornelius Loos was born in 1546 in Gouda to a patrician family. He studied Philosophy and Theology at what is today known as the Catholic University of Leuven. In 1574, Loos and his family were forced to leave for political reasons (primarily the capture of the city by Protestant/nationalist rebels during the Dutch Revolt). After he was ordained as a priest, he was awarded a Doctor of Theology degree in 1578 at the University of Mainz, where he became a Professor of Theology and a vigorous campaigner against Protestant beliefs. In the 1580s, Loos published a number of works: a prayer book, polemical theological writings against Protestantism, a political work (by subscription) about the Netherlands rebellion, a survey of German Catholic authors, and a pocket Latin grammar book.

In 1585, he moved to Trier, where he observed the witch trials taking place there. Loos first wrote letters to the city authorities, and, failing in that effort, he sought in 1592 to publish a book protesting against the hunts and questioning some of the beliefs of the witch hunters. The attempted publication of De vera et falsa magia (True and False Magic) offended Peter Binsfeld, the Suffragan Bishop of Trier and deputy to Archbishop-Elector Johann VI von Schonenberg, one of the highest-ranking officials in the Holy Roman Empire. However, before the book could be printed, the manuscript copy was seized and Loos imprisoned. He was forced to make a public recantation of his errors on his knees before an assembly of church officials, including the Papal Nuncio, in Brussels on March 25, 1593. The manuscript was believed destroyed by the Inquisition and was lost for 300 years.

== De vera et falsa magia discovered ==
In 1886, American George Lincoln Burr discovered the manuscript of True and False Magic in the Jesuit Library in Trier (a remnant of the University, which was dissolved in 1798). Although the title page was missing and no author was listed, Burr was able to authenticate the document by comparing the points made in the text with the points recanted in Loos’s confession to the Inquisition. A copy can be found in the rare manuscript collection at Cornell University; the original is held by the Trier Municipal Library.

In the manuscript, Loos argues against the existence of witchcraft and especially against the validity of confessions obtained under torture. (Binsfeld had in 1589 published his own book on witchcraft, in which he supported confessions and denunciations obtained through torture.) In his work, Loos is believed to have been influenced by the arguments of Johann Weyer, a Protestant Dutch physician, who in 1563 put forth a book attacking the persecution of witches while also categorizing kinds of magical demons.

After recanting, Loos was under constant watch by religious officials, and was briefly imprisoned several more times, under the accusation that he had relapsed into theological error. This continued persecution was conducted by his nemesis, a priest in the Jesuit order named Martin Delrio. Loos died on 3 February 1595, in Brussels, succumbing to the Plague; Delrio lamented that Loos had died before he could be brought to justice.

== Contributions ==
Although, as noted above, Loos was not the first to write against the witch hunts, he was the first Catholic priest and theologian to do so, and the first to specifically question the validity of confessions obtained under torture. Even though Loos' work was lost for 300 years, his opponent Martin Delrio ensured his continuing fame by publishing a book denouncing him, and by summarizing each of his arguments in the recantation which he had forced Loos to sign.

== See also ==
- Friedrich Spee, a Jesuit priest who criticized the witch trials decades later
