= Frank E. Hopkins =

American politician

Frank Easton Hopkins (March 30, 1863 – February 26, 1933) was an American church music composer, book printer, and politician from New York.

== Life ==
Hopkins was born on March 30, 1863, in New York City. He graduated from Boston University in 1887.

For many years, Hopkins worked as a book designer for De Vinne Press. In 1896, he established his own printing company, the Marion Press, in Jamaica, Queens. He named it after his daughter, Marion Day. He also was an organist and choirmaster of the Grace Episcopal Church, and wrote choir music. He was an active freemason, and served as master and organist of the Jamaica Lodge.

Hopkins was the unsuccessful Republican candidate for the New York's 2nd congressional district in the 1912, 1914, 1922, and 1924 United States House of Representatives elections. In 1916, he was elected to the New York State Assembly as a Republican, representing the Queens County 4th District. He served in the Assembly in 1917 and 1919.

Hopkins died in Topeka, Kansas, on February 26, 1933. He went to Topeka with his wife to visit their daughter and for health reasons. He was buried in Grace Episcopal Churchyard in Jamaica, Queens.

New York State Assembly
Preceded by George E. Polhemus	New York State Assembly; Queens County, 4th District; 1917	Succeeded by L. Eugene Decker
Preceded by L. Eugene Decker	New York State Assembly; Queens County, 4th District; 1919	Succeeded by Nicholas M. Pette
