= James H. Sweet =

American historian

James Hoke Sweet is an American historian, who served as president of the American Historical Association in 2022. He is best known for his books Recreating Africa (2003) and Domingos Álvares (2011), specialising in African history. A graduate of the University of North Carolina at Chapel Hill and the Graduate Center of the City University of New York, he has taught at Florida International University, the University of Wisconsin–Oshkosh, and the University of Wisconsin–Madison.
