= George Lincoln Burr =

U.S. historian, diplomat, and author (1857–1938)

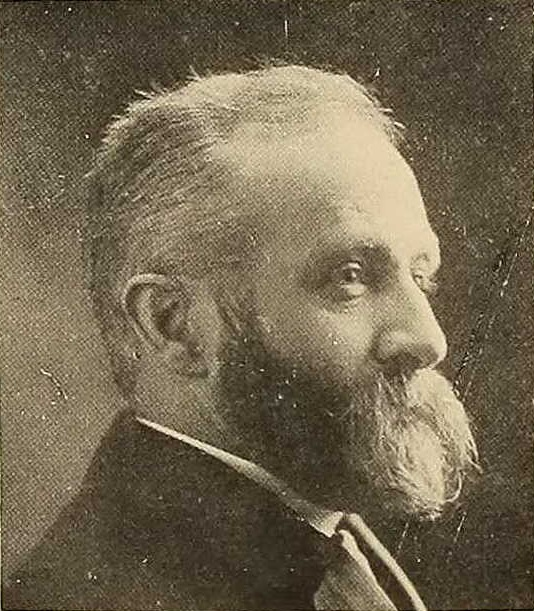
George Lincoln Burr, circa 1902

George Lincoln Burr (January 30, 1857 – June 27, 1938) was a US historian, diplomat, author, and educator, best known as a Professor of History and Librarian at Cornell University, and as the closest collaborator of Andrew Dickson White, the first President of Cornell.

Burr was born in Albany, New York and entered the Cortland Academy in 1869, where he first met Andrew Dickson White, who was guest speaker for its 50th anniversary. The financial Panic of 1873 wreaked havoc on his family's finances, and he was forced to leave school and seek employment at age 16. After a brief stint as a schoolmaster, he apprenticed as a printer of The Standard at Cortland. After 4 years, he had saved $200, sufficient for him to matriculate at Cornell in 1877. As a sophomore, Burr audited a course for seniors taught by White on the historical development of criminal law, and received permission to sit for the exam. Prof. White was so impressed by Burr's exam answers that he secretly appointed Burr as his examiner (i.e., grader) in history. White writes in his Autobiography, "Of course this was kept entirely secret; for had the Seniors known that I had entrusted their papers to the tender mercies of a Sophomore, they would probably have mobbed me."

After his graduation in 1881, Burr accepted White's offer to serve as an instructor and examiner in modern history, and also as White's private secretary. This was the beginning of a literary partnership that lasted until White's death in 1918. Under White's tutelage, Burr developed into a scholar of medieval history. After traveling and studying in Switzerland, France, and Germany, Burr was appointed to the Cornell faculty in 1888. He was made Professor of Medieval History in 1892. In 1919, he was elected John Stambaugh Professor of History.

== Librarian, collector of rare books for A. D. White ==
As the librarian of Andrew Dickson White's historical rare book collection from 1880 to 1922, Burr built Cornell's manuscript and rare book collections in the areas of witchcraft, the Reformation, and the French Revolution. His single most famous contribution in this area was his discovery in 1885, in the library at the University of Trier, of the Loos Manuscript (1592), one of the first books written in Germany against the witch trials of the late 16th century, and long believed destroyed by the Inquisition.

This discovery led Burr to abruptly leave his studies in Europe to return to New York with the manuscript. He never earned any higher degree beyond his A.B. from Cornell. (His higher degrees are all honorary ones: LL.D.s from the University of Wisconsin–Madison in 1904 and from Washington College in 1907, and a Litt.D. from Western Reserve, now Case Western, in 1905).

== Warfare of Science with Theology ==
Starting in 1869, and throughout his career, Professor White argued that history showed the negative outcomes resulting from any attempt on the part of religion to interfere with the progress of science. Burr was deeply influenced by White's views, and assisted him in editing a series of articles, published in Popular Science, covering all aspects of the debate. Burr did much of the research for the two-volume A History of the Warfare of Science with Theology in Christendom (1896).

In addition to compensating Burr for his assistance, White offered to credit him on the title page, an offer Burr declined. He later devoted considerable effort to revising the work, though this revised version was never published. This response was characteristic of Burr. While he was sympathetic to White’s project, he ultimately concluded that the book did not fulfill the promise of its title, and in his own revision he retitled the second volume Warfare of Humanity. In 1904, he wrote to White:

Your book has, of course, the defects of its qualities. Its looseness of citation and broadness of statement are but a part of that genial companionableness and largeness which are its charm. Its whole treatment suggests rather the conversation of a scholarly and widely experienced man of action than the closet of the bookworm.

== Scholarly and teaching pursuits ==
Burr's most noted contributions came from his teaching and service work. He served as co-editor of the American Historical Review from 1905 to 1915 with J. Franklin Jameson, was a member of the American Historical Association, and served as its President in 1916. He was elected a member of the American Antiquarian Society in 1908. He served as historical consultant for the U. S. Commission appointed by U.S. President Grover Cleveland to settle a boundary dispute between Venezuela and British Guiana. The commission included two university presidents, Andrew Dickson White of Cornell and Daniel Coit Gilman of Johns Hopkins, and White suggested that Burr be appointed to research the history and geography of the disputed territory. This assignment took Burr to archives in The Hague and London. He was also sent thousands of pages from the Venezuelan government, and in the end, this effort occupied much of his time from 1896 to 1899. His friend and colleague J. Franklin Jameson pronounced the Venezuela Boundary Commission report "as fine a piece of historical research and criticism as ever was buried in a government report."

At Cornell, Burr is most remembered as a teacher who took great pains to encourage his students. He dined frequently at the Cornell women's dining hall, to demonstrate his support for women's education and to encourage student interest in history. His biographer, Roland Bainton, credits Cornell in general and Burr in particular with producing historians who populated the history faculties at what were then the women's colleges of Vassar and Wellesley. He also identifies Burr as a key consultant to faculty at Stanford University (due to his friendship with and respect for David Starr Jordan) and the University of California in the vetting of candidates. Among the students in whom he took an interest were Jessie Fauset, Winifred (Sprague) Humphrey, and Charles A. Beard.

Students and colleagues who have explicitly acknowledged Burr's influence include:

- Lois Oliphant Gibbons – Professor, Western College for Women, now Miami University
- Elizabeth Donnan – historian of the slave trade in America, author of the four-volume Documents Illustrative of the Slave Trade to America
- Louise Fargo Brown – the first woman to win the AHA Baxter Prize, in 1911, for her work, The Political Activities of the Baptists and Fifth-Monarchy Men in England during the Interregnum
- Leo Gershoy – professor at New York University (NYU) 1940–1975, and in whose name the AHA awards an annual prize for the best new book on 17th or 18th-century European history, and in whose name an annual lecture is given at NYU
- George Matthew Dutcher – Professor of History at Wesleyan University
- George H. Sabine – Professor of History, Ohio State University
- Edward M. Hulme – Professor of History, Stanford University 1921–1937, and author of two books (see below) which explicitly state they are based on outlines "printed but not published" by George Lincoln Burr

Burr married Cornell graduate Mattie Alexander Martin in August 1907. She died after giving birth in January 1909, as did their child.

== Contemporary references ==
- The life of George Lincoln Burr and his discovery of the lost treatise of Loos is the subject of Elmar Bereuters historic novel, Die Lichtfänger.

== Bibliography ==
=== Works by Burr ===
- Narratives of the Witchcraft Cases, 1648–1706, edited by G. L. Burr, 1914, New York: C Scribner's Sons, or Reprint, Mineola, N.Y.: Dover Publications, 2002. Also available online at Narratives of the Witchcraft Cases, 1648–1706, e-text, University of Virginia
- "The Freedom of History" (Burr's 1916 Presidential address to the American Historical Association), The American Historical Review, Vol. 22, No. 2. (Jan. 1917), pp. 253–271. Also available online at The Freedom of History, American Historical Association
- Venezuela-British Guiana Boundary Commission, Appointed by the President of the United States "to investigate and report upon the true divisional line between the Republic of Venezuela and British Guiana." Reports. Washington, DC: Government Print Office, 1897.
- New England's Place in the History of Witchcraft. Freeport, N.Y.: Books for Libraries Press, 1971.

=== Works in which Burr's notes are cited as basis ===
- Hulme, Edward Maslin (1923), The Renaissance, the Protestant Revolution and the Catholic Reformation in Continental Europe, New York: The Century Press
- Hulme, Edward Maslin (1929), The Middle Ages, New York: H. Holt

=== Works about Burr ===
- George Lincoln Burr: His Life, by Roland H. Bainton; Selections from His Writings, edited by Lois Oliphant Gibbons. Ithaca, N.Y.: Cornell University Press, 1943.
- Persecution and Liberty; Essays in Honor of George Lincoln Burr. Freeport, N.Y.: Books for Libraries Press, 1968.
- Great Teachers : Portrayed by Those Who Studied under Them, edited / with an introduction by Houston Peterson, (1955), New York: Vintage Books
