= Thomas J. Wertenbaker =

American historian

Thomas Jefferson Wertenbaker
- Born: February 6, 1879; Charlottesville, Virginia, United States
- Died: January 20, 1950 (aged 57); Princeton, New Jersey, United States
- Education: University of Virginia (B.A. and M.A. 1902), (Ph.D. 1910)
- Occupations: Scholar, historian, author, professor

Thomas Jefferson Wertenbaker (February 6, 1879, Charlottesville, VA, US – April 22, 1966, Princeton, NJ, US) was a leading American historian and the second Edwards Professor of American History at Princeton University.

== Early and family life ==
Born in Charlottesville, Virginia, Wertenbaker was the youngest son of former CSA Colonel Charles C. Wertenbaker and his wife Fanny (the former Frances Thomas Leftwich).

He barely knew his grandfather, William Wertenbaker (1797-1882) who was the second librarian of the University of Virginia, according to his gravestone appointed to that office in 1826 by former President Thomas Jefferson, who founded the university. The boy's name (as well as that of an uncle) honored that link. Grandfather Wertenbaker built three houses on his property located between the university campus and Charlottesville's town center, which was developed into the Wertland Street Historic District after his death. Although by the time of this boy's birth, his father was involved in agar manufacturing and his only brother living at home was a salesman, his father was involved in Confederate memorials, having been colonel of a Virginia Infantry unit during the Civil War, and several relatives also fought for the Confederacy in the conflict.

According to the dust jacket of one of his books, Torchbearer of the Revolution (1940), Wertenbaker was descended from one of Bacon's followers in Bacon's Rebellion "who had the distinction of being the first native-born Virginian to be hanged in Virginia." However, he fails to specify the ancestor's name, and the book mixes history and historical fiction. The Library of Virginia has made available online several notes by lawyer and author Samuel Bassett French, who died before completing a planned biographical dictionary, about members of his family, including this man's birth near Milton outside of Charlottesville, the furthest navigable point on the James River, and from where bateaux conveyed tobacco downriver to Richmond. His grandfather William Wertenbaker fought in the War of 1812, then by 1840 owned 14 slaves in Albemarle County, reduced to eight slaves in 1850. In the last census before the Civil War and abolition of slavery, William Wertenbaker owned nine enslaved people, ranging from 64-and-54-year-old women to 14-, 12- and 10-year-old boys and 8-year-old and 8-month-old girls.

According to another of his books, The Shaping of Colonia Virginia, T.J. Wertenbaker attended private schools including Jones' University School before graduating from Charlottesville Public High School and beginning studies at the University of Virginia in 1893. Wertenbaker interrupted those studies in 1900-1901 to teach at St. Matthew's School in Dobbs Ferry, New York before returning to the University of Virginia and receiving Bachelor's and Master's degrees in 1902. At the University of Virginia, he was a brother of the Phi Kappa Psi fraternity, which was headed at the time by one Woodrow Wilson. He became an editor of the Charlottesville Morning News and the Baltimore News before re-entering the University of Virginia as a graduate student in 1906, and continued those studies while also teaching as an Assistant Professor of History at Texas Agricultural and Mechanical College beginning in 1907. He became an instructor in the University of Virginia's history department in 1909 and completed his thesis and received his PhD degree the following year. Wertenbaker later received honorary degrees from several universities in the United States and abroad.

== Career ==
In 1910, Virginia-born Princeton President Woodrow Wilson brought Wertenbaker to Princeton as a preceptor and in the same year his doctoral dissertation, Patrician and Plebeian in Virginia (1910) was published and well received (and republished several times, including in 1959). That and Virginia Under the Stuarts (1914) refuted the previously dominant Cavalier myth. His master work may be The Planters of Colonial Virginia (1922). Wertenbaker was considered one of the "Progressive School" of American historians, as were Charles and Mary Beard, James Truslow Adams and Vernon Louis Parrington. Wertenbaker regarded the three volumes of The Founding of American Civilization as his greatest work, but others criticized it for basing theories on little evidence. The volumes appeared individually as The Middle Colonies (1938), The Old South (1942), and The Puritan Oligarchy (1947), with the last not well received. Others criticized him for seeing the faults of the Old South as well as its virtures, or failed to appreciate his attempts to tweak "Yankee" preconceptions.

Wertenbaker was a member of Princeton's history department for 37 years and its chairman from 1928 to 1936. An effective and popular undergraduate teacher, he also guided most of the department's graduate students and increased the department's prestige from that of a college to a university equal to many in Europe before retiring in 1947. Wertenbaker also taught as an assistant professor at the University of Göttingen (1931) and was the Harold Vyvyan Harmsworth Professor of American History at Oxford University (1939-1940 and 1944-1945). Following his retirement, Weretenbaker lived for two years in Williamsburg, Virginia and continued researching and writing, and also taught at the Ludwig-Maximilians-Universität München (1950–1951) and at several American universities.

He was president of the American Historical Association in 1947, and a longtime member of the American Antiquarian Society and the American Philosophical Society.

== Death and legacy ==
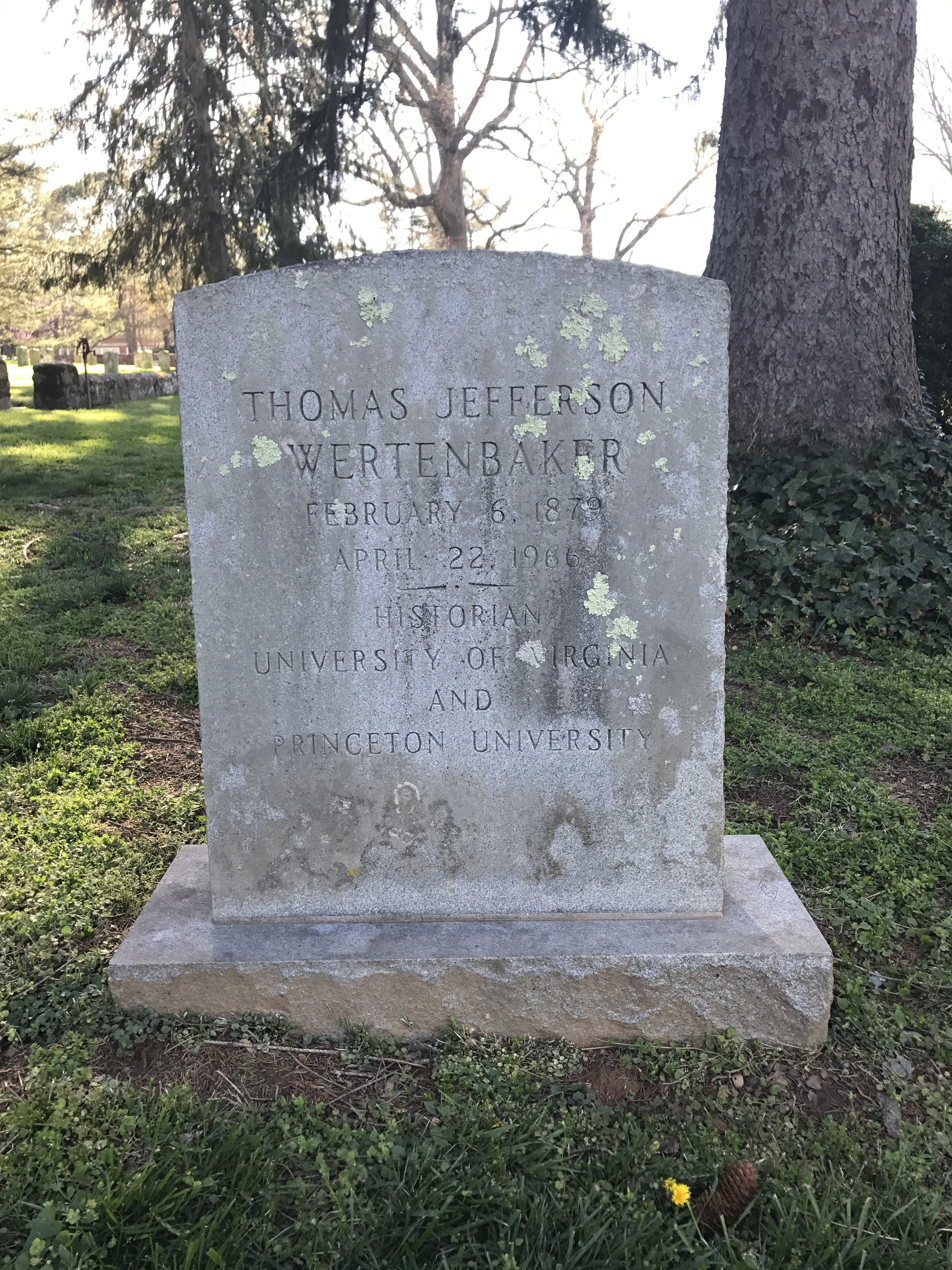
Wertenbaker's gravestone at the University of Virginia Cemetery in Charlottesville, Virginia.

Wetenbaker died of a stroke in the Prospect Avenue home in Princeton, New Jersey that he had designed himself. He was survived by his wife, Sarah Rossiter Wertenbaker, and their son, Thomas Jefferson Wertenbaker Jr. His remains were returned for burial at the University of Virginia Cemetery in Charlottesville, Virginia.

== Selected works ==
- Patrician and Plebeian in Virginia; Or The Origin and Development of the Social Classes of the Old Dominion (doctoral thesis) (1910) online edition
- Virginia Under the Stuarts, 1607–1688 (Princeton University Press, 1914) online edition
- The Planters of Colonial Virginia (Princeton University Press, 1922) online edition
- The American People, a History (1927)
- The Founding of American Civilization: The Middle Colonies (1938) online edition
- Torchbearer of the Revolution: The Story of Bacon's Rebellion and Its Leader (1940) short review
- The Old South: The Founding of American Civilization (1942) review
- The Puritan Oligarchy: The Founding of American Civilization (1947)
- The Molding of the Middle West (1948) (address to the American Historical Association) online edition
- Bacon's Rebellion, 1676 (1957) online edition
- Give Me Liberty: The Struggle for Self-Government in Virginia (1958) online edition
