= David H. Pinkney =

American historian

David H. Pinkney (1914–1993) was a renowned scholar of French history, author, and emeritus professor of history at the University of Washington, from 1967 until his retirement in 1984.

Pinkney, born in Elyria, Ohio, attended Oberlin College and received his doctorate in history from Harvard University in 1941. During World War II, he served in the Office of Strategic Services and the U.S. Navy. After military service, Pinkney began his long teaching career at the University of Missouri. In 1966 he moved to the University of Washington where he taught until his retirement in 1984.

Pinkney authored five books and multiple articles on French history, specifically the French Revolution of 1789 and the post-revolution years. Pinkney was one of the co-founders of the Society for French Historical Studies and held many positions within the society over the years, including president from 1975 to 1976, as well as member of the executive board for twenty-seven years. From 1966 to 1975 he was editor-in-chief for the journal of French Historical Studies.

Pinkney received international acclaim for his contributions to French history and received an honorary doctorate from the University of Nantes. He was elected president of the American Historical Association in 1980 and participated in drafting a new constitution for the organization. He was chosen as fellow of the American Academy of Arts and Sciences in 1984. The David H. Pinkney prize for best French history book by an American or Canadian professor is awarded yearly through the Society for French Historical Studies.

== Bibliography ==
- "Two Thousand Years of Paris," The Journal of Modern History Vol. 23, No. 3, September 1951
- "Napoleon III's Transformation of Paris: The Origins and Development of the Idea," The Journal of Modern History Vol. 27, No. 2, June 1955
- Napoleon III and the Rebuilding of Paris (1958)
- A Festschrift for Frederick B. Artz (1964)
- The French Revolution of 1830 (1972)
- Napoleon, Historical Enigma (1978)
- Decisive Years in France, 1840–1847 (1986)
