= The Marion Press =

- Status: Defunct
- Founded: 1896
- Founder: Frank E. Hopkins
- Defunct: 1906; 119 years ago
- Country of origin: United States
- Headquarters location: New York City
- Fiction genres: Bierstadt collotype prints and engravings

The Marion Press was an American publishing house in New York City that was in operation from 1896 - 1906. Much of the Marion Press' work had been inspired by and compared with the Kelmscott Press of William Morris.

The company also included Bierstadt collotype prints and engravings by the Gill Engraving Co. in the company's efforts to create what Hopkins referred to as "all types of good plain printing from new types of conservative design."

== History ==
It was established in October 1896 in Jamaica, Queens by Frank E. Hopkins, who had worked as a long time printer at DeVinne Press. After many years as a printer of 'fine books', with a gas engine and many power presses, Mr. Hopkins decided to open his own printing enterprise, named after his own daughter, Marion Day.

Hopkins hired his brothers Thomas J. Hopkins and Charles H. Hopkins along with W.F. Butler as the sole type setters.
