= Herbert Baxter Adams =

American educator and historian (1850–1901)

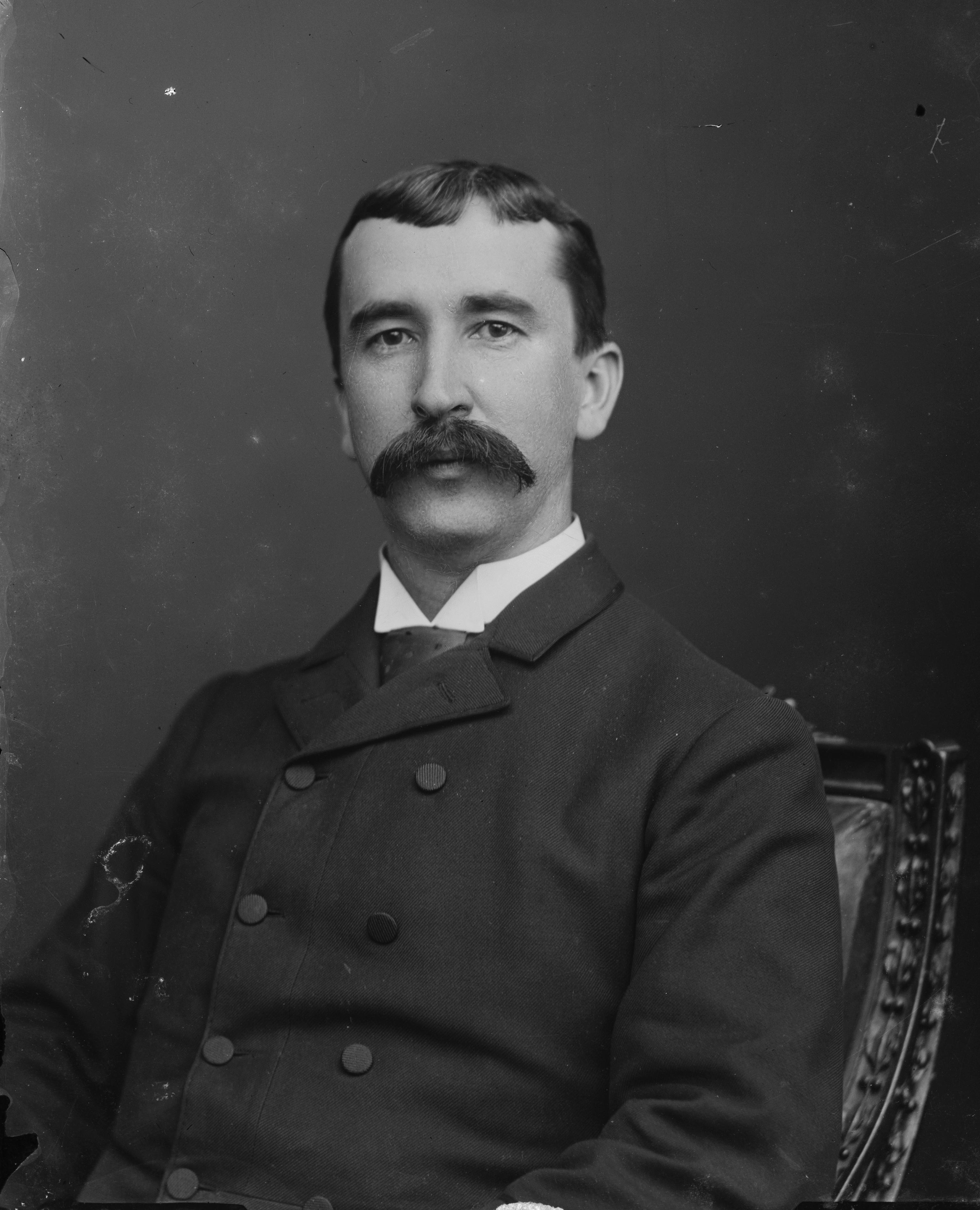
- Adams, 1870–1880
- Born: April 16, 1850; Shutesbury, Massachusetts, U.S.
- Died: July 30, 1901 (aged 51); Amherst, Massachusetts, U.S.
- Education: Amherst College (AB, AM); University of Heidelberg (PhD)
- Scientific career
- Fields: History
- Workplaces: Johns Hopkins University
- Academic advisors: Johann Gustav Droysen; Johann Kaspar Bluntschli
- Doctoral students: Charles Homer Haskins; Frederick Jackson Turner

Herbert Baxter Adams (April 16, 1850 – July 30, 1901) was an American educator and historian who brought German rigor to the study of history and social science in America. He was a professor at Johns Hopkins University.

He was a founding member of the American Historical Association, and one of the earliest American educators using the seminar for teaching history. With a fresh PhD from the Heidelberg University in Germany, Johns Hopkins University brought Adams in as a teaching fellow in history during their inaugural year. Adams stayed with Johns Hopkins until his health failed.

Adams was instrumental in organizing the American Historical Association. A leading organizer of American graduate schools, he contributed to various reform efforts. His legacy is honored through various awards and professorships at Johns Hopkins University.

== Early life ==
Adams was born to lumber merchant Nathaniel Dickinson Adams and Harriet (Hastings) Adams in Shutesbury, Massachusetts, on April 16, 1850.

On his mother's side, he was a descendant of Thomas Hastings who came from the East Anglia region of England to the Massachusetts Bay Colony in 1634. In 1880, he published a privately printed genealogy: History of the Thomas Adams and Thomas Hastings families, of Amherst, Massachusetts.

Herbert B. Adams received his early training in the Amherst, Massachusetts public schools followed by Phillips Exeter Academy. He graduated from Amherst College, with an AB in 1872 and AM in 1875.

In 1873 Adams traveled to Europe to study and write. In 1874 he moved to Heidelberg, Germany, to pursue, two years later, the PhD degree in political science. There he was influenced by Johann Gustav Droysen and Johann Kaspar Bluntschli, the latter also becoming his mentor. Heidelberg did not then require a thesis from its doctoral candidates, instead it required an oral examination, for which he chose political science for his major field (Hauptfach), with two minors (Nebenfächer) in public and international law and in political and cultural history. Adams passed the oral examination on July 13, 1876, summa cum laude.

== Career ==
The new Johns Hopkins University, which opened in 1876, wanted to bring German-style graduate education to the United States. Adams was hired as fellow in history from 1876 to 1878, associate from 1878 to 1883, and was appointed associate professor in 1883. He is credited with bringing the study of history into the realm of the social sciences: "Adams, with his German training, was determined to inaugurate through the seminar system the scientific study of history based on careful, critical examination of the sources. He hoped to make the study of history an independent professional pursuit rather than a mere branch of literature."

From 1878 to 1881 Adams was also a lecturer in history at Smith College. He was then a member of the New England Historic Genealogical Society, from 1881 to 1886.

At Johns Hopkins, in 1880, Adams began his famous seminar in history, where a large proportion of the next generation of American historians trained. Among his students were Woodrow Wilson, Thomas Dixon, Jr., John Dewey, and Charles McLean Andrews. In 1882 Adams founded the "Johns Hopkins Studies in Historical and Political Science," the first such series. He was elected a member of the American Antiquarian Society in 1881. He brought about the organization in 1884 of the American Historical Association, for which he was secretary until 1900, when he resigned and was made first vice president. His historical writings introduced scientific methods of investigation that influenced many historians, including Frederick Jackson Turner and John Spencer Bassett. He authored Life and Writings of Jared Sparks (2 vols., 1893) and many articles and influential reports on the study of the social sciences.

His principal writings are:

- The Germanic Origin of the New England Towns
- Saxon Tithing-Men in America
- Norman Constables in America
- Village Communities
- Methods of Historical Study and,
- Maryland's Influence upon Land Cessions to the United States

All these papers are published in the Johns Hopkins University Studies in Historical and Political Science, edited by Prof. Adams, 4 vols. (Baltimore, 1883–1986). Although less known for his contributions to the history of education, Adams was essential to its early development. He edited the circular series titled, Contributions to American Educational History which was printed and distributed by the U.S. Bureau of Education.

A new class of experts needed new modes of training, and those were provided by the new American graduate schools, built along German models. Adams was a leading organizer. He was a Mugwump who promoted reform at Johns Hopkins and nationally. Under his direction, the faculty and advanced students worked for numerous reforms, including civil service reform in the Pendleton Act (1883), municipal reform with the New Charter of Baltimore (1895), the training of professional social workers, and efforts to solve labor unrest. Raymond Cunningham, argues that his reformism shows that the Mugwumps movement could attract affirmative and optimistic experts, rather than just suspicious or cautious patricians.

== Last years ==
Adams was elected as a member of the American Philosophical Society in 1886. He received the degree LL.D. from the University of Alabama in 1891, and from Amherst in 1899.

Adams made a report to the U.S. Bureau of Education on summer schools in Europe in 1896, and resigned the chair of American and institutional history at Johns Hopkins University in December, 1900, to take effect in February, 1901, and then visited Florida.

Returning to his home in Amherst, Massachusetts, Adams died on July 30, 1901, and was buried next to his parents and older brother in Wildwood Cemetery.

== Honors ==
- Adams House, an undergraduate dormitory at Johns Hopkins University, is named for him.
- The American Historical Association's Herbert Baxter Adams prize was named for him.
- The Herbert Baxter Adams Professorship at Johns Hopkins University was created in his honor.
