= Samuel S. French =

American Civil War Medal of Honor recipient (1841-1913)

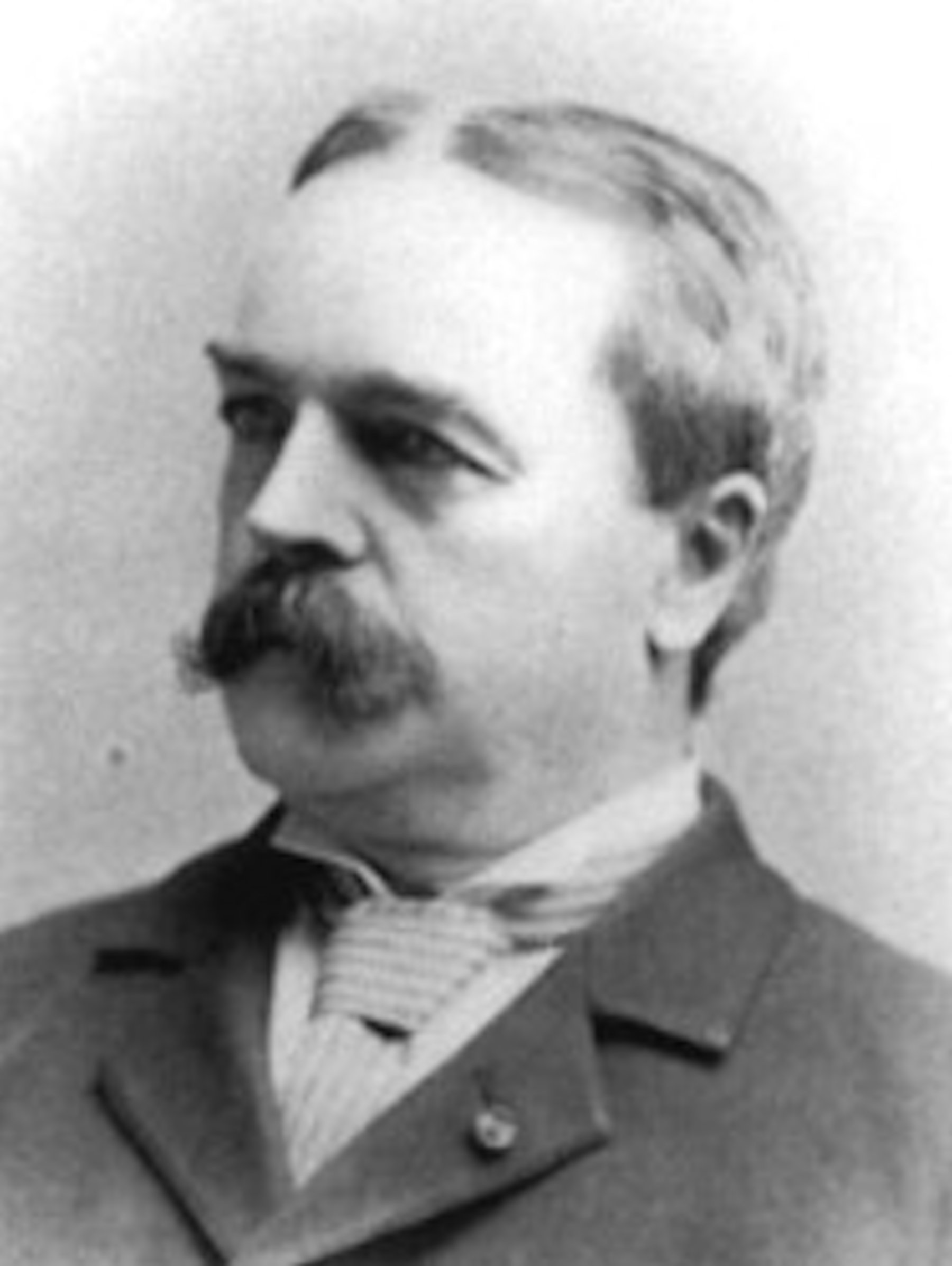
- French in 1894
- Born: April 23, 1841; Erie County, New York
- Died: March 17, 1913 (aged 71); Gilford, Michigan
- Burial place: Gilford Cemetery, Michigan
- Military career
- Allegiance: United States
- Branch: United States Army
- Rank: Private
- Units: Company E, 7th Michigan Volunteer Infantry Regiment
- Conflicts: Battle of Seven Pines
- Awards: Medal of Honor

Private Samuel S. French (April 23, 1841 – February 17, 1913) was an American soldier who fought in the American Civil War. French received the country's highest award for bravery during combat, the Medal of Honor, for his action during the Battle of Seven Pines in Virginia on May 31, 1862. He was honored with the award on October 24, 1895.

== Biography ==
French was born in Erie County, New York, on April 23, 1841. He enlisted into the 7th Michigan Infantry. He died on February 17, 1913, and his remains are interred at the Gilford Cemetery in Michigan.

== Medal of Honor citation ==
The President of the United States of America, in the name of Congress, takes pleasure in presenting the Medal of Honor to Private Samuel S. French, United States Army, for extraordinary heroism on 31 May 1862, while serving with Company E, 7th Michigan Infantry, in action at Fair Oaks, Virginia. Private French continued fighting, although wounded, until he fainted from loss of blood.

== See also ==
- List of American Civil War Medal of Honor recipients: A–F
