= Charles McLean Andrews =

American historian

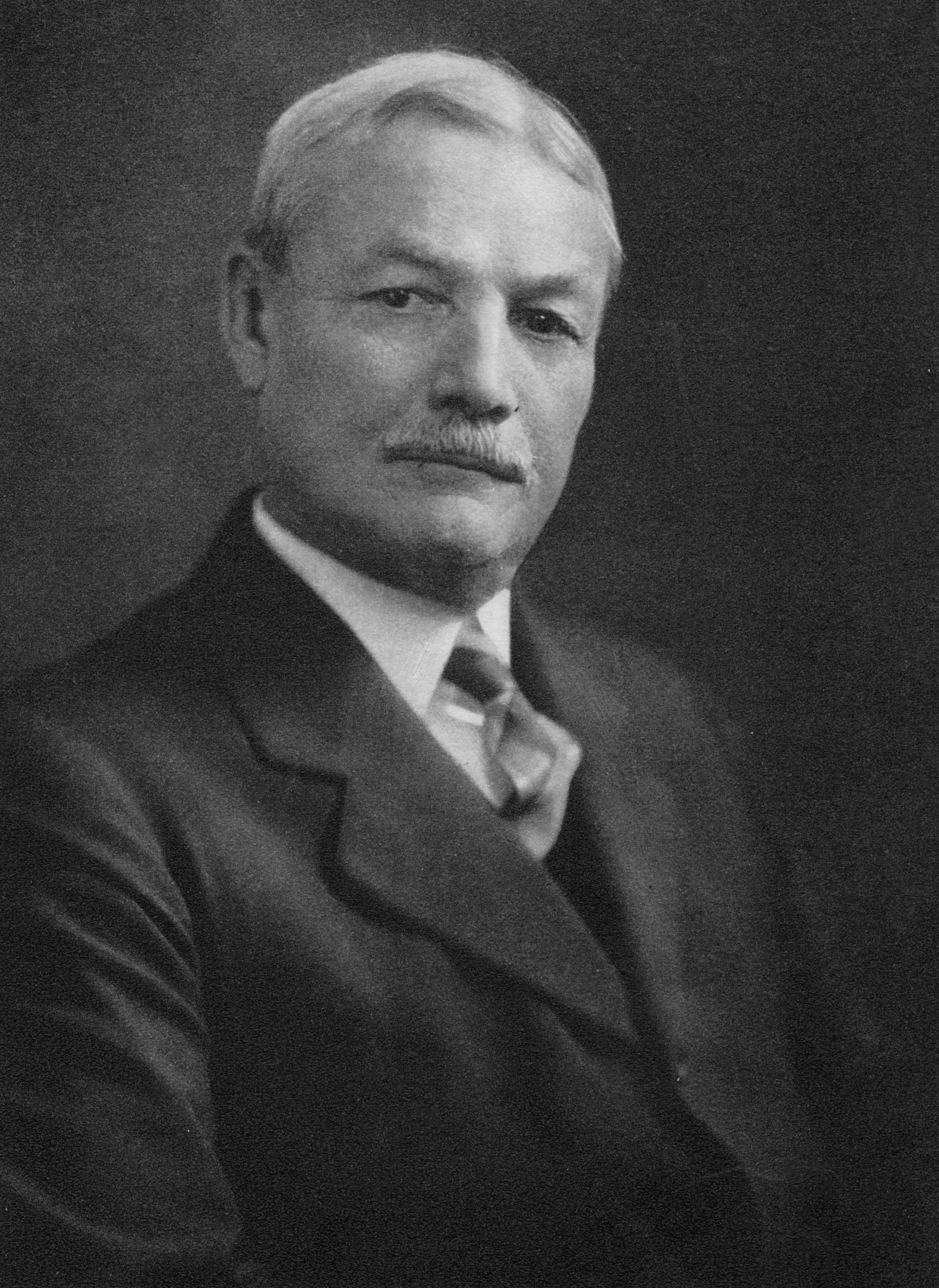
- Born: February 22, 1863; Wethersfield, Connecticut, U.S.
- Died: September 9, 1943 (aged 80); New Haven, Connecticut, U.S.
- Occupation: Historian
- Writing career
- Period: 1888–1937
- Subjects: American History, Colonial History

Charles McLean Andrews, Ph.D, L.H.D. (February 22, 1863 – September 9, 1943) was an American historian and professor at Yale University whose Colonial Period of American History, vol. 1 of 4, was awarded the Pulitzer Prize for history in 1935. Among his other books are British committees, commissions, and councils of trade and plantations, 1622-1675 (Johns Hopkins Press, 1908), co-author of the 1910 publication titled A bibliography of history for schools and libraries: with description and critical annotations, and The Colonial Period (1912).

He wrote 102 major scholarly articles and books, as well as over 360 book reviews, newspaper articles, and short items. He is especially known as a leader of the "Imperial school" of historians who studied, and generally admired, the efficiency of the British Empire in the 18th century. Kross argues:

His intangible legacy is twofold. First is his insistence that all history be based on facts and that the evidence be found, organized, and weighed. Second is his injunction that colonial America can never be understood without taking into account England.

== Life and recognition ==
Born in Wethersfield, Connecticut, his father, William Watson Andrews, was a minister in the Catholic Apostolic Church. Andrews received his A.B. from Trinity College, Hartford, Conn., in 1884 and spent two years as principal of West Hartford High School before entering graduate school at Johns Hopkins University. At Johns Hopkins, Andrews studied under Herbert Baxter Adams and received the Ph.D. in 1889. He was a professor at Bryn Mawr College (1889–1907) and Johns Hopkins University (1907–1910) before going to Yale University. He was the Farnam Professor of American History at Yale from 1910 to his retirement in 1931.

He served as acting president of the American Historical Association in 1924 after the death of Woodrow Wilson, and then president in his own right in 1924 and 1925. He held various memberships including the American Philosophical Society, the Royal Historical Society, the American Academy of Arts and Letters, and Phi Beta Kappa. He was elected a member of the American Antiquarian Society in 1907, and elected a fellow of the American Academy of Arts and Sciences in 1918.

Andrews won the Pulitzer Prize in history in 1935 for the first volume of his four-volume work The Colonial Period of American History. He was awarded the gold medal, given once a decade, by the National Institute of Arts and Letters for his work in history, and he received honorary doctorates from Harvard, Yale, Johns Hopkins, and Lehigh University.

He married Evangline Holcombe Walker; their daughter Ethel married John Marshall Harlan II, who became an Associate Justice of the Supreme Court of the United States in 1954.

Andrews died in New Haven, Connecticut.

== Approach to history ==
His Yankee ancestors had been in Connecticut for seven generations, so his interest in American colonial history, including the history of Connecticut, is unsurprising (his first book, The River Towns of Connecticut, published in Baltimore in 1889, was about the settlement of Wethersfield, Hartford, and Windsor). Yet Andrews was not uncritical of early New England.

Along with Herbert L. Osgood of Columbia University, Andrews led a new approach to American colonial history, which has been called the "imperial" interpretation. Andrews and Osgood emphasized the colonies' imperial ties to Great Britain, and both wrote seminal articles on the subject in the Annual Report of the American Historical Association for the Year 1898. Rather than emphasizing conscious British tyranny leading up to the American Revolution, in works such as The Colonial Period (New York, 1912), he saw the clash as the inevitable result of the inability of British statesmen to understand the changes in society in America.

Andrews' thorough research into archival sources, and a demonstration of scholarship through many books and articles, set a standard that led his colleagues to praise him as the "dean" of colonial historians. Among his students at Yale who went on to become colonial historians and future leaders of the "imperial" school were Leonard Woods Labaree, Lawrence Henry Gipson, Isabel M. Calder, and Beverley W. Bond, Jr.

== Quotation ==
In 1924 he wrote:

A nation's attitude toward its own history is like a window into its own soul and the men and women of such a nation cannot be expected to meet the great obligations of the present if they refuse to exhibit honesty, charity, open-mindedness, and a free and growing intelligence toward the past that has made them what they are.

== Bibliography ==
- Ideal Empires and Republics (1901) online
- Colonial Self-Government (1904) online
- The Colonial Period New York, 1912 online
- Pilgrims and Puritans (1919) online
- Colonial Folkways (1920) online
- The Colonial Period of American History Yale UP: 1934–1937 (4 volumes). His magnum opus. volume 1 volume 2 volume 3 volume 4
- The Colonial Background of the American Revolution New Haven, 1924
- The Fathers of New England online
- Jonathan Dickinson's Journal, edited with Evangeline Walker Andrews (1945)
