= S. Bassett French =

American politician

Samuel Bassett French
- Born: March 31, 1820; Norfolk, Virginia, US
- Died: April 25, 1898 (aged 78); Manchester, Virginia, US
- Education: Hampden-Sydney College
- Military career
- Allegiance: Confederate States of America
- Branch: Confederate States Army
- Service years: 1861–1865
- Rank: Colonel
- Units: staff officer, Army of Northern Virginia

Samuel Bassett French (March 31, 1820 – April 25, 1898) was a Virginia lawyer and bureaucrat, Confederate officer, newspaperman, author and municipal judge.

== Early and family life ==
Born in Norfolk, Virginia, to Rev. John French and his wife, the former Frances ("Fanny") Marsden, Bassett received a private classical education at Norfolk Academy, then graduated from Hampden-Sydney College. He traveled northward in the Shenandoah Valley to read law under Robert Y. Conrad in Winchester, Virginia.

S. Bassett French married Helen Bland Lyle on February 28, 1847 and their children included: Jane Lyle French (1847-1857), Frances (Fanny) Moseley French (b. 1849), Helen Bland French Batte (b. 1851), John Marsden French (1853-1884), Sallie Bassett French Gary (1857-1884), Bassett Charles French (b. 1859), Annie Cooper French Robinson (1860-1881), James Lyle (b/d 1862), Robert Lee(b. 1863) and Cary Brodnax French (b. 1867). At some point French bought "Whitby", the former Goode family plantation in Manchester, Virginia, near the landing where slaves had disembarked for sale in Richmond across the river. Whitby served as a Confederate hospital and was destroyed late in the war.

== Career ==
Admitted to the Virginia bar in 1840, French became a U.S. commissioner in bankruptcy in 1842 and moved to the state capital, where he practiced in Chesterfield County across the James River from Richmond. French served as Chesterfield County's Commonwealth's Attorney (prosecutor) from 1849 until 1852, then began working for the Virginia General Assembly. He was clerk of the Virginia Senate Committee on Properties and Grievances and an assistant clerk in the Virginia House of Delegates.

The University of Virginia library has French's notes of the Virginia Secession Convention of 1861. After Virginia seceded from the union, French served as an aide de camp to Governor John Letcher, and then the Army of Northern Virginia, including returning to Richmond with news of the death of Gen. Stonewall Jackson. He was also on the staff of Governor and General Extra Billy Smith until April 1864, at which time French became a Commercial Agent for Virginia. He surrendered to General Meade at Burkeville on April 13, 1865, and later was active in Confederate veterans' organizations, including as secretary of the Lee Monument Association. After the war, French wrote for the Richmond Enquirer newspaper and served as personal secretary to former Confederate general turned political boss William Mahone.

French also edited a magazine, The Farmer's Friend, and compiled biographies of approximately 9,000 Virginians, for a planned book tentatively called Annals of Prominent Virginians of the XIX Century.

After a controversial election in which the Chesterfield County vote was thrown out, the Virginia Senate elected French as judge of the Manchester Corporation Court on January 23, 1880, and he served there until his death.

== Death and legacy ==
French died on April 25, 1898.

In 1949 the Library of Virginia published a microform containing his biographical sketches of notable Virginians that French had been editing into a book, and continues to hold them in its collection. The Swem library at the College of William and Mary in Williamsburg also has some of French's papers, chiefly correspondence to him concerning those biographies. In 1964, Glenn C. Oldaker compiled and published S. Bassett French's memoirs.
