= Waldo Gifford Leland =

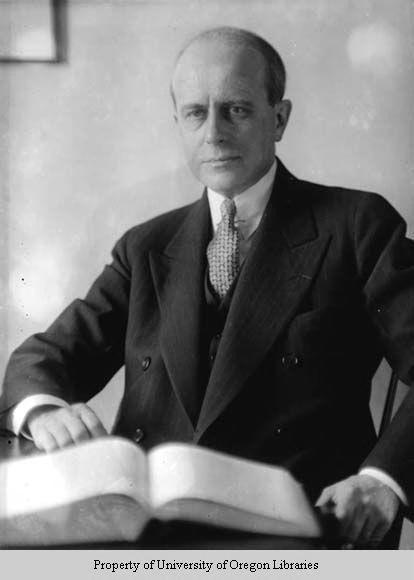
- Born: Waldo Gifford Leland; July 17, 1879; Newton, Massachusetts, U.S.
- Died: October 19, 1966 (aged 87); Washington, D.C., U.S.
- Education: Brown University (A.B., 1900); Harvard University (A.M., 1901)
- Occupations: Historian; archivist
- Years active: 1903–1966

Waldo Gifford Leland (July 17, 1879, in Newton, Massachusetts – October 19, 1966) was an American historian and archivist whose work for the Carnegie Institution and the Library of Congress was instrumental in the founding of the National Archives. He also served in leadership roles in a variety of historical and archival societies, including the American Council of Learned Societies, Society of American Archivists, National Park Service, and the FDR Library.

== Early life ==
Leland was born in Massachusetts, the son of public school teachers Luther Erving Leland and Ellen Gifford, the latter of whom descended from a line of wealthy landowners in Plymouth Colony and Westport, MA.

After graduating from Newton High School in 1896, Leland went to Brown University, earning a B.A. In 1900 he enrolled at Harvard University, earning his M.S. in history in 1901. In 1904 Leland married Gertrude Dennis, a Canadian-born violinist.

== Carnegie Institution and American Historical Association ==
In 1903 Harvard professor Albert Bushnell Hart offered Leland, then a teaching assistant, the opportunity to assist Claude H. Van Tyne in a survey sponsored by the newly founded Carnegie Institution in Washington, D.C. A 6-month temporary assignment was the beginning of Leland's 24-year association with the institution.

The Guide to the Archives of the Government of the United States in Washington (1904), coauthored by Leland and Van Tyne, was followed in 1907 by an edition revised and expanded by Leland, which established Leland as the nation's leading authority on federal archives.

Leland joined the American Historical Association (AHA) and served as the secretary in 1909-1920, working closely with J. Franklin Jameson to lobby Congress to establish a National Archive.

== National and international archival work ==
After completing the Guide, Leland's next assignment from the Carnegie Institution was to travel to repositories throughout the eastern United States to collect letters of Continental Congress delegates.

He then began work on his multi-volume Guide to Materials for American History in the Libraries and Archives of Paris. In 1907-1914 and 1922-1927 he served as the Carnegie Institution's principal representative in France. Two volumes, on libraries and on the archives of the Ministry of Foreign Affairs, were published in 1932 and 1943. Drafts for an additional three volumes are among the Leland Papers, archived at the Library of Congress. In an associated activity, he directed the foreign copying program of the Library of Congress for French manuscripts relating to the United States. He also initiated work on what became the institution's 2-volume Calendar of Manuscripts in Paris Archives and Libraries Relating to the History of the Mississippi Valley to 1803.

In his best-known archival-related activity he worked with J. Franklin Jameson to provide documentation for the campaign to establish the National Archives. In 1926 Congress voted funds for the building's construction, and it finally opened in 1934. Leland's influence on archival affairs, however, transcended his efforts on behalf of the National Archives. He conceived the first Conference of Archivists in the United States, which met at Columbia University in conjunction with the American Historical Association's 1909 Annual Meeting. He took this opportunity to introduce Americans to a variety of European concepts that soon became institutionalized as standard best practices in the United States and formed the basis for archival theory.

Leland's address at the 1909 conference on "American Archival Problems" remains a classic in the archival literature.

Leland led a delegation of Americans to the First International Congress of Archivists and Librarians in Brussels in 1910, a meeting that set the stage for the growing global interchange of archival theories and concepts. He attended classes in Archive Economy at the Ecole des Chartres in 1913-1914, and continued to use American Historical Association gatherings as a venue to introduce such principles as provenance and original order to American audiences.

Although Leland had moved away from direct participation in archival affairs by the 1920s, the Society of American Archivists recognized his contribution by electing him its second president in 1939. His two presidential addresses on "The Archivist in Times of Emergency" and "Historians and Archivists in the First World War" set an important scholarly tone for the fledgling professional association.

== Founding member and leader of ACLS and ICHS ==
In 1923 the International Congress of Historical Sciences (ICHS) appointed a committee that, under Leland's guidance, led to the formation in 1926 of the International Committee of Historical Sciences. Leland initially served as the new group's treasurer and in 1938 became its president, a position he held for 10 years. During much of that period he also served as president of the Union Académique International (UAI).

In 1919 Leland acted as organizing secretary for a meeting of representatives from leading American scholarly societies in the social sciences and the humanities that led to the formation of the American Council of Learned Societies (ACLS), a step taken to create an American organization eligible for membership in the newly reorganized UAI. In 1927 the ACLS received a major grant from the Rockefeller Foundation, enabling it to secure the services of a full-time administrative officer. Leland left the Carnegie Institution to take the position. Leland served as ACLS secretary in 1927 to 1939 and as director from 1939 until his retirement in 1946.

As the ACLS representative in the negotiation of the “1935 Gentleman’s Agreement for Fair Use in Education”, Leland was heavily involved in the first official policy statement concerning the use of copyrighted materials by researchers.

Leland oversaw both the ACLS's international cooperative activities and its domestic programs, including publication of The Dictionary of American Biography (1927-1936) and the annual Handbook of Latin American Studies, begun in 1935. Through Leland's efforts, the ACLS distributed money to individual scholars to support research and publications. Also, through fellowships and the sponsorship of scholarly conferences, the ACLS was able to encourage the development of area studies in the United States for Chinese, Japanese, Indian, Iranian, Slavic, Near Eastern, and Latin American culture and civilization.

== Work in UNESCO, FDR Library, and National Park Service ==
During the interwar years Leland worked with the League of Nations and served as a delegate to the United Nations Conference on International Organization that led to the establishment of the United Nations Educational, Scientific, and Cultural Organization (UNESCO) and to the 1948 UNESCO General Conference in Beirut. In 1946-1949 he served as vice-chairman (under Milton Eisenhower) of the United States National Commission for UNESCO.

He also served two terms during this period as president of the Society of American Archivists.

After his retirement from the ACLS in 1946, Leland became active in the promotion and development of the Franklin Delano Roosevelt Library, testifying before Congress, giving speeches, and working with architects and designers. He served as chair of the Executive Committee of the FDR Library Foundation in 1946-1952.

Leland became chairman of the Advisory Board of the National Park Service in 1935 and remained in that position until the 1950s. The board had a strong influence in the development and management of the NPS. It not only advised the United States Secretary of the Interior and the NPS director on policy, but it evaluated new areas proposed for addition to the system. It developed policy guidelines on matters related to historical sites and buildings and embraced the development and safeguarding of all parks in the system.

Congress passed an act in 1955 addressing the role of the NPS with regard to historic properties. There was particular concern that the integration of historic sites and buildings into the NPS, which had been authorized earlier in the 1950s, be appropriate. The act was stimulated by discussion over the Rockefeller family's development of Williamsburg, Virginia. A commission under Leland's direction was sent to Europe to study the mechanisms for historical preservation used there.

Waldo Leland died on October 19, 1966, at age 87.

== Awards, prizes, and memorials ==
Among the honors he received were honorary degrees conferred by Brown University in 1929, the University of Rochester in 1939, Northwestern University in 1944, the University of Colorado in 1943, and the University of North Carolina in 1946.

He was elected to the American Philosophical Society in 1931 and the American Academy of Arts and Sciences in 1932.

He was named director emeritus of the ACLS in recognition of his years of service, and received the Pugsley Medal in 1949 for his service to the National Park System.

The Society of American Archivists established a prize in his honor in 1959.

The American Historical Association established a prize in his memory in 1981.

== Selected Publications ==
- Van Tyne, Claude Halstead; Leland, Waldo Gifford (1904). Guide to the Archives of the Government of the United States in Washington. Carnegie Institution of Washington Publication. Washington, D.C.: Carnegie Institution of Washington.
- Van Tyne, Claude Halstead; Leland, Waldo Gifford (1907). Guide to the Archives of the Government of the United States in Washington. Carnegie Institution of Washington Publication (2nd, rev. and enl. ed.). Washington, D.C.: Carnegie Institution of Washington.
- Leland, Waldo Gifford (October 1912). "The National Archives: A Programme". The American Historical Review. 18 (1): 1–28. doi:10.2307/1832693.
- Leland, Waldo G.; Mereness, Newton D. (1926). Introduction to the American Official Sources for the Economic and Social History of the World War. Economic and Social History of the World War. American Series. New Haven: Yale University Press.
- Leland, Waldo G. (1932). Guide to Materials for American History in the Libraries and Archives of Paris. Carnegie Institution of Washington Publication. Vol. 1. Washington, D.C.: Carnegie Institution of Washington.
- Leland, Waldo Gifford (January 1941). "The Archivist in Times of Emergency". The American Archivist. 4 (1): 1–12.
- Leland, Waldo Gifford (1948). UNESCO and the Defenses of Peace. Stanford: Stanford University Press. pp. v, 36.
- Leland, Waldo Gifford (October 1951). "Some Early Recollections of an Itinerant Historian". Proceedings of the American Antiquarian Society. 61 (2): 267–296.
- Leland, Waldo Gifford (1955). Archival Principles: Selections from the Writings of Waldo Gifford Leland. Staff Information Paper. Washington, D.C.: National Archives and Records Service.
- Leland, Waldo Gifford (January 1955). "The Creation of the Franklin D. Roosevelt Library: A Personal Narrative". The American Archivist. 18 (1): 11–29. doi:10.17723/aarc.18.1.83858324503u51m1.
- Leland, Waldo Gifford (April 1964). "The Prehistory and Origins of the National Historical Publications Commission". The American Archivist. 27 (2): 187–194.

== Additional Reading ==
- Ross, Rodney A. (Summer 1983). "Waldo Gifford Leland: Archivist by Association". The American Archivist. 46 (3): 264–276. doi:10.17723/aarc.46.3.j441j4563n720p52.
- "Waldo Gifford Leland and Preservation of Documentary Resources". The Federalist. Society for History in the Federal Government. Summer 1986.
- Washington Post editorial, October 23, 1966.
- Waldo Leland, historian: obituary, New York Times, October 20, 1966.
- Wosh, Peter J., ed. (2011). Waldo Gifford Leland and the Origins of the American Archival Profession. Chicago: Society of American Archivists. pp. vi+397. ISBN 978-1-931666-40-4. LCCN 2011028500.
