= New England History Teachers' Association =

The New England History Teachers' Association (NEHTA) was founded in 1897 and is the United States' oldest association of teachers of history and social studies. It promotes discussion of teaching in the field amongst teachers, students and academics.

The NEHTA is a founding member of the National Council for the Social Studies and remains its senior affiliate. The NEHTA sponsors meetings each year dealing with topics of special interest to its constituency and joins with other associations and groups in promoting those interests. Currently, The New England Journal of History (until 1988, The New England Social Studies Bulletin) is published twice annually and offers historical research, reviews, and methodological articles. The NEHTA also publishes The NEHTA Newsletter and Forum (formerly The NEHTA Newsletter). It offers short articles of current concern, information on the NEHTA and resources for those involved in teaching history. Annually, the NEHTA presents the Kidger Award for outstanding contributions to research, teaching, or service to the profession. The NEHTA also annually presents the Laska Award for undergraduate research.
