= Historiography of the United States =

The historiography of the United States refers to the studies, sources, critical methods and interpretations used by scholars to study the history of the United States. While history examines the interplay of events in the past, historiography examines the secondary sources written by historians as books and articles, evaluates the primary sources they use, and provides a critical examination of the methodology of historical study.

== Organizations ==
Historians have formed scores of scholarly organizations, which typically hold annual conferences where scholarly papers are presented, and which publish scholarly journals. In addition, every state and many localities have their own historical societies, focused on their own histories and sources.

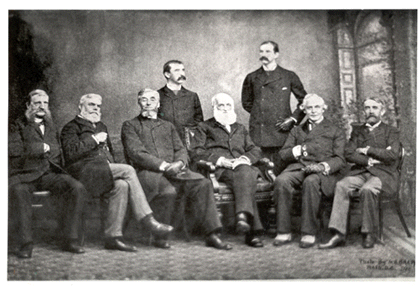
1889 AHA officers

The American Historical Association (AHA) is the oldest and largest society for professional historians in the U.S. Founded in 1884, it promotes historical studies covering all continents and time periods, the teaching of history, and the preservation of and access to historical materials. It publishes The American Historical Review five times a year, with scholarly articles and book reviews.

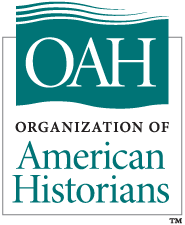
OAH logo

While the AHA is the largest organization for historians working in the United States, the Organization of American Historians (OAH) is the major organization for historians who study and teach about the United States. Formerly known as the Mississippi Valley Historical Association, its membership comprises college and university professors, as well as graduate students, independent historians, archivists, museum curators, and other public historians. The OAH publishes the quarterly scholarly journal Journal of American History. In 2010 its individual membership was 8,000 and its institutional membership 1,250, and its operating budget was approximately $2.9 million

Other large regional groups for professionals include the Southern Historical Association, founded in 1934 for white historians teaching in the South. It now chiefly specializes in the history of the South. In 1970, it elected its first black president, John Hope Franklin. The Western History Association formed in 1961 to bring together both professional scholars and amateur writers dealing with the West. Dozens of other organizations deal in specialized topics, such as the Society for Military History and the Social Science History Association.

== Pre-1800 ==
During the colonial era, there were a handful of serious scholars—most of them men of affairs who wrote about their own colony. They included Robert Beverley (1673–1722) on Virginia, Thomas Hutchinson (1711–1780) on Massachusetts, and Samuel Smith on Pennsylvania. The Loyalist Thomas Jones (1731–1792) wrote on New York from exile.

== 1780–1860 ==
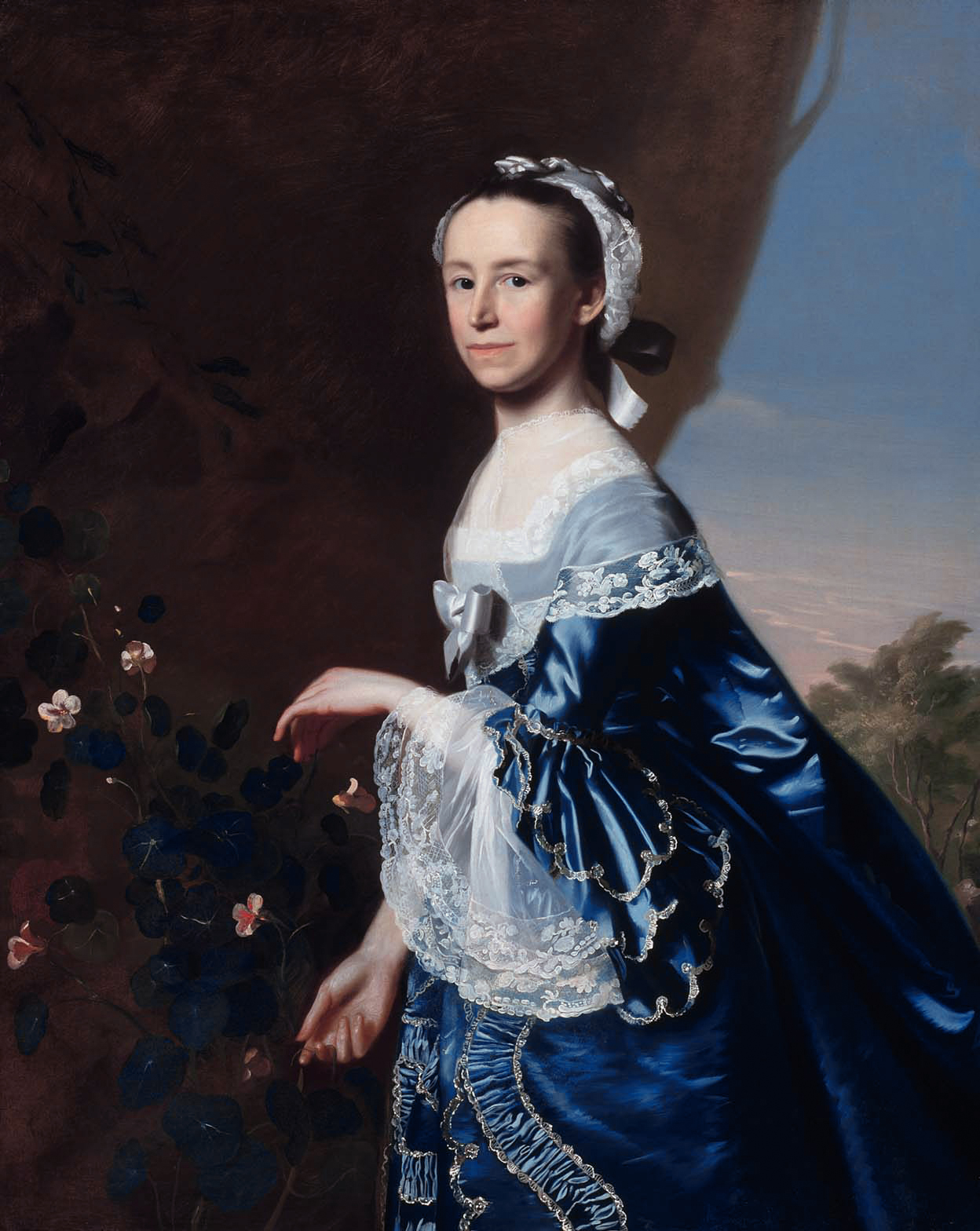
A 1763 portrait of Mercy Otis Warren by John Singleton Copley

The historiography of the Early National period focused on the American Revolution and the Constitution. The first studies came from Federalist historians, such as Chief Justice John Marshall (1755–1835). Marshall wrote a well-received four-volume of biography of George Washington that was far more than a biography, and covered the political and military history of the Revolutionary Era. Marshall emphasized Washington's virtue and military prowess. Historians have complimented his highly accurate detail, but note that Marshall—like many early historians—relied heavily on the Annual Register, edited by Edmund Burke. Mercy Otis Warren (1728–1814) wrote her own history favoring the Jeffersonian perspective stressing natural rights and equality. She emphasized the dangers to republicanism emanating from Britain, and called for the subordination of passion to reason, and the subsuming of private selfishness in the general public good.

=== Ramsay ===
David Ramsay (1749–1815), an important Patriot leader from South Carolina, wrote thorough, scholarly histories of his state and the early United States. Trained as a physician, he was a moderate Federalist in politics. Messer (2002) examines the transition in Ramsay's republican perspective from his History of the American Revolution (1789) and his biography of Washington (1807) to his more conservative History of the United States (3 vol. 1816–17), which was part of his 12-volume world history. Ramsay called on citizens to demonstrate republican virtues in helping reform and improve society. A conservative, he warned of the dangers of zealotry and the need to preserve existing institutions. O'Brien (1994) says Ramsay's 1789 History of the American Revolution was one of the earliest and most successful histories. It located American values within the European Enlightenment. Ramsay had no brief for what later was known as American exceptionalism, holding that the destiny of the new nation United States would be congruent with European political and cultural development.

=== Hildreth ===
Richard Hildreth (1807–1865), a Yankee scholar and political writer, wrote a thorough highly precise history of the nation down to 1820. His six-volume History of the United States (1849–52) was dry and heavily factual—he rarely made a mistake in terms of names, dates, events and speeches. His Federalist views and dry style lost market share to George Bancroft's more exuberant and democratic tomes. Hildreth explicitly favored the Federalist Party and denigrated the Jeffersonians. He was an active political commentator and leading anti-slavery intellectual, so President Lincoln gave him a choice diplomatic assignment in Europe.

=== Bancroft ===
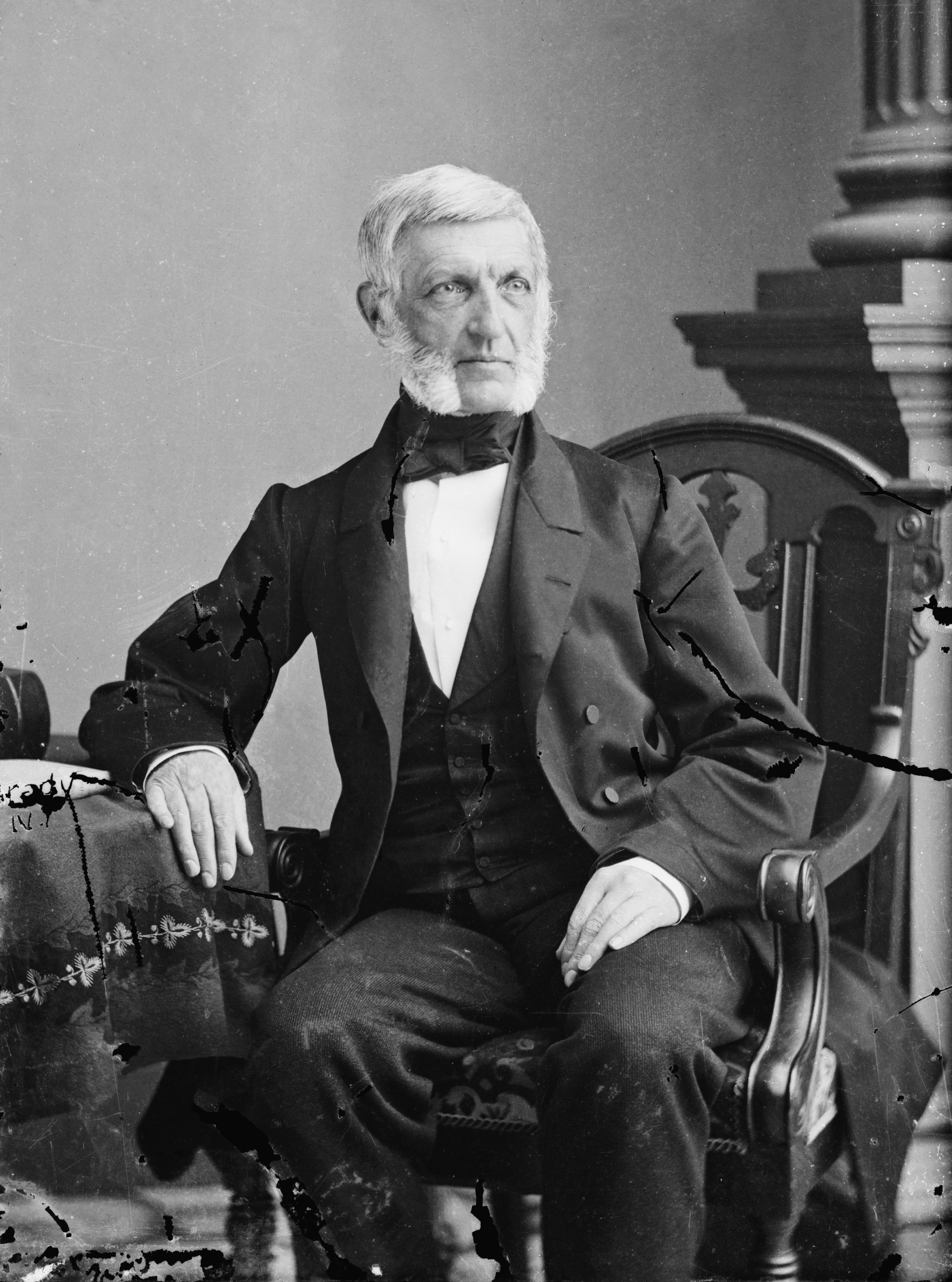
George Bancroft United States Secretary of Navy c. 1860

George Bancroft (1800–1891), trained in the leading German universities, was a Democratic politician and accomplished scholar, whose magisterial History of the United States, from the Discovery of the American Continent covered the new nation in depth down to 1789. Bancroft was imbued with the spirit of Romanticism, emphasizing the emergence of nationalism and republican values, and rooting on every page for the Patriots. His masterwork started appearing in 1834, and he constantly revised it in numerous editions. Along with John Gorham Palfrey (1796–1881), he wrote the most comprehensive history of colonial America. Billias argues Bancroft played on four recurring themes to explain how America developed its unique values: providence, progress, patria, and pan-democracy. "Providence" meant that destiny depended more on God than on human will. The idea of "progress" indicated that through continuous reform a better society was possible. "Patria" (love of country) was deserved because America's spreading influence would bring liberty and freedom to more and more of the world. "Pan-democracy" meant the nation-state was central to the drama, not specific heroes or villains.

Bancroft was an indefatigable researcher who had a thorough command of the sources, but his rotund romantic style and enthusiastic patriotism annoyed later generations of scientific historians, who did not assign his books to students. Furthermore, scholars of the "Imperial School" after 1890 took a much more favorable view of the benign intentions of the British Empire than he did.

=== Creating and preserving collective memory ===
In 1791 the Massachusetts Historical Society became the nation's first state historical society; it was a private association of well-to-do individuals with sufficient leisure, interest, and resources for the society to prosper. It set a model that every state followed, although usually with a more popular base and state funding. Archivist Elizabeth Kaplan argues the founding of a historical society begins an upward spiral with each advance legitimizing the next. Collections are gathered that support publication of documents and histories. These publications in turn give the society and its topic legitimacy and authenticity. The process creates a sense of identity and belonging. The builders of state historical societies and archives in the late 19th and early 20th century were more than antiquarians—they had the mission of creating as well as preserving and disseminating the collective memories of their communities. The largest and most professional collections were built at the State Historical Society of Wisconsin in Madison by Lyman Draper (1852–1887) and Reuben Gold Thwaites (1887–1913). Their extensive collection of books and documents became (and remain) a major scholarly resource for the graduate program in history at the University of Wisconsin. Thwaites disseminated materials nationally through his edited series, especially Jesuit Relations' in 73 volumes, Early Western Travels in 32 volumes, and Original Journals of the Lewis and Clark Expedition in eight volumes, among others.

At the national level, major efforts to collect and publish important documents from the revolutionary era were undertaken by Jonathan Elliott (1784–1846), Jared Sparks (1789–1866), Peter Force (1790–1868) and other editors.

The military history of the Civil War especially fascinated Americans, and the War Department compiled and published a massive collection of original documents that continues to be heavily used by scholars. The Official Records of the War of the Rebellion appeared in 128 large volumes published between 1881 and 1901. It included military and naval records from both sides, as well as important documents from state and national governments.

== Colonial and Revolution ==
=== Imperial School ===
While most historians saw the colonial era as a prelude to the Revolution, by the 1890s the "Imperial School" was interpreting it as an expression of the British Empire. The leaders included Herbert L. Osgood, George Louis Beer, Charles M. Andrews and Lawrence Henry Gipson. Andrews, based at Yale, was the most influential. They took a highly favorable view of the benefits achieved by the economic integration of the Empire. The school practically died out by 1940, but Gipson published his fifteen-volume history of The British Empire Before the American Revolution (1936–70) and won the 1962 Pulitzer Prize in History.

=== Progressive historians ===
Progressive historians such as Carl L. Becker, Arthur M. Schlesinger Sr., Vernon L. Parrington, and Charles A. Beard downplayed the Patriot grievances of the 1760s and 1770s as rhetorical exercises that covered the greed of smugglers and merchants who wanted to avoid taxes. Schlesinger argued the false propaganda was effective: "The stigmatizing of British policy as 'tyranny,' 'oppression' and 'slavery, had little or no objective reality, at least prior to the Intolerable Acts but ceaseless repetition of the charge kept emotions at fever pitch." The Progressive interpretation was dominant before 1960, as historians downplayed rhetoric as superficial and looked for economic motivations.

=== Republicanism ===
In the 1960s and 1970s, a new interpretation emerged that emphasized the primacy of ideas as motivating forces in history (rather than material self-interest). Bernard Bailyn, Gordon Wood from Harvard formed the "Cambridge School"; at Washington University the "St. Louis School" was led by J.G.A. Pocock. They emphasized slightly different approaches to republicanism.

The new discovery was that the colonial intellectual and political leaders in the 1760s and 1770s closely read history to compare governments and their effectiveness of rule. They were especially concerned with the history of liberty in England, and the rights Englishmen, which they claimed were the proper heritage of the colonists. These intellectuals were especially influenced by Britain's "country party" (which opposed the Court Party that actually held power). Country party relied heavily on the classical republicanism of Roman heritage; it celebrated the ideals of duty and virtuous citizenship in a republic. It drew heavily on ancient Greek city-state and Roman republican examples. The Country party roundly denounced the corruption surrounding the "court" party in London centering on the royal court. This approach produced a political ideology Americans called "republicanism", which was widespread in America.by 1775. "Republicanism was the distinctive political consciousness of the entire Revolutionary generation." J.G.A. Pocock explained the intellectual sources in America:

The Whig canon and the neo-Harringtonians, John Milton, James Harrington and Sidney, Trenchard, Gordon and Bolingbroke, together with the Greek, Roman, and Renaissance masters of the tradition as far as Montesquieu, formed the authoritative literature of this culture; and its values and concepts were those with which we have grown familiar: a civic and patriot ideal in which the personality was founded in property, perfected in citizenship but perpetually threatened by corruption; government figuring paradoxically as the principal source of corruption and operating through such means as patronage, faction, standing armies (opposed to the ideal of the militia); established churches (opposed to the Puritan and deist modes of American religion); and the promotion of a monied interest—though the formulation of this last concept was somewhat hindered by the keen desire for readily available paper credit common in colonies of settlement.

Revolutionary Republicanism was centered on limiting corruption and greed. Virtue was of the utmost importance for citizens and representatives. Revolutionaries took a lesson from ancient Rome, they knew it was necessary to avoid the luxury that had destroyed the Empire. A virtuous citizen was one that ignored monetary compensation and made a commitment to resist and eradicate corruption. The Republic was sacred; therefore it is necessary to serve the state in a truly representative way, ignoring self-interest and individual will. Republicanism required the service of those who were willing to give up their own interests for a common good. According to Bernard Bailyn, "The preservation of liberty rested on the ability of the people to maintain effective checks on wielders of power and hence in the last analysis rested on the vigilance and moral stamina of the people." Virtuous citizens needed to be strong defenders of liberty and challenge the corruption and greed in government. The duty of the virtuous citizen become a foundation for the American Revolution.

=== Atlantic history ===
Since the 1980s a major trend has been to locate the colonial and revolutionary eras in the wider context of Atlantic history, with emphasis on the multiple interactions among the Americas, Europe and Africa. Leading promoters include Bernard Bailyn at Harvard, and Jack P. Greene at Johns Hopkins University.

== Turnerian School ==
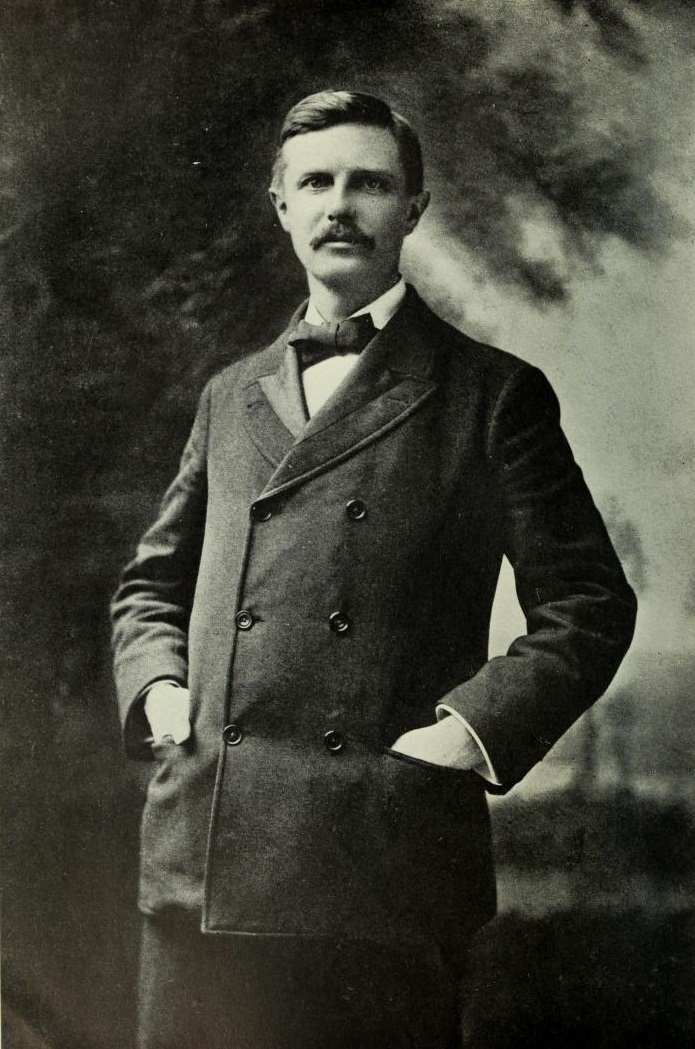
Frederick Jackson Turner

The Frontier Thesis or Turner Thesis, is the argument advanced by historian Frederick Jackson Turner in 1893 that the origin of the distinctive egalitarian, democratic, aggressive, and innovative features of the American character has been the American frontier experience. He stressed the process—the moving frontier line—and the impact it had on pioneers going through the process. In the thesis, the frontier established liberty by releasing Americans from European mind-sets and ending prior customs of the 19th century. The Turner thesis came under attack from the "New Western Historians" after 1970 who wanted to limit western history to the western states, with a special emphasis on the 20th century, women and minorities.

== Beardian School ==
The Beardians were led by Charles A. Beard (1874–1948), who wrote hundreds of monographs, textbooks and interpretive studies in both history and political science. The most controversial was An Economic Interpretation of the Constitution of the United States (1913), which indicated that the founding fathers who wrote the Constitution in 1787 were motivated more by the fate of financial investments than anything idealistic. He wrote:

The overwhelming majority of members, at least five-sixths, were immediately, directly, and personally interested in the outcome of their labors at Philadelphia.

Beard's most influential book, written with his wife Mary Beard, was the wide-ranging and bestselling The Rise of American Civilization (1927). It had a major influence on a generation of American historians. Prominent Beardian historians included C. Vann Woodward, Howard K. Beale, Fred Harvey Harrington, Jackson Turner Main, and Richard Hofstadter (in his early years) Similar to Beard in his economic interpretation, and almost as influential in the 1930s and 1940s was literary scholar Vernon Louis Parrington.

Beard was famous as a political liberal, but he strenuously opposed American entry into World War II, for which he blamed Franklin D. Roosevelt more than Japan or Germany. This isolationist stance destroyed his reputation among scholars. By about 1960 they also abandoned his materialistic model of class conflict. Richard Hofstadter concluded in 1968:

Today Beard's reputation stands like an imposing ruin in the landscape of American historiography. What was once the grandest house in the province is now a ravaged survival.

However the Wisconsin School of diplomatic history in the 1960s adopted a neo-Beardian model, as expressed at the University of Wisconsin by a number of scholars, most notably William Appleman Williams in The Tragedy of American Diplomacy (1959) but also Walter LaFeber in The New Empire (1963). The idea was that material advantage, especially foreign markets for surplus goods, was more of a motivating force among American decision-makers in foreign affairs than was spreading liberty to the world. Wisconsin School historians generally thought that it was possible to correct this decision-making emphasis on markets and doing so would make for a more effective American diplomacy.

A different strain of historical thought in the 1960s was associated with the New Left and incorporated more radical interpretations of American diplomatic history. These scholars included Marxists such as Gabriel Kolko, who generally felt that there were fundamental structural causes, due to the needs of American capitalism, behind American foreign policy and that little could reverse that short of an outright remaking of the economic system.

== Consensus historiography: Americans in political agreement ==
To replace Beardianism "consensus" historiography emerged in the late 1940s and 1950s, with such leaders including Richard Hofstadter, Louis Hartz, Daniel J. Boorstin and David M. Potter. Other prominent exemplars included Perry Miller, Clinton Rossiter, Henry Steele Commager, Allan Nevins and Edmund Morgan.

Eric Foner, a liberal, says that Hofstadter's book The American Political Tradition (1948) "propelled him to the very forefront of his profession." Millions of Americans, on and off campus, read it. Its format is a series of portraits of leading men from the Founding Fathers through Jefferson, Jackson, Lincoln and FDR. Foner argues:

Hofstadter's insight was that virtually all his subjects held essentially the same underlying beliefs. Instead of persistent conflict (whether between agrarians and industrialists, capital and labor, or Democrats and Republicans), American history was characterize by broad agreement on fundamentals, particularly the virtues of individual liberty, private property, and capitalist enterprise.

== Native Americans ==
According to historian David Rich Lewis, American popular histories, film and fiction have given enormous emphasis to the Indian wars. From a professional standpoint, he argues, "American Indian history has a venerable past and boasts a tremendous volume of scholarship judging by the published bibliographies." Lewis adds, "it has been difficult to distract academics or the public from the drama of Indian wars. Most of the older histories of Indians and the American West emphasized this warfare and the victimization of Indian peoples."

After 1970 new ethnohistorical approaches appeared providing an anthropological perspective that deepened understanding of the Indian perspective. The new scholarly emphasis on victimization mentored by the 1980s scholars were dealing more harshly with the U.S. government's failures and emphasizing the impact of the wars on native peoples and their cultures. An influential book in popular history was Dee Brown's Bury My Heart at Wounded Knee (1970). In academic history, Francis Jennings's The Invasion of America: Indians, Colonialism, and the Cant of Conquest (New York: Norton, 1975) was notable for strong attacks on the Puritans and rejection of traditional portrayal of the wars between the indigenous peoples and colonists.

== Slavery and black history ==
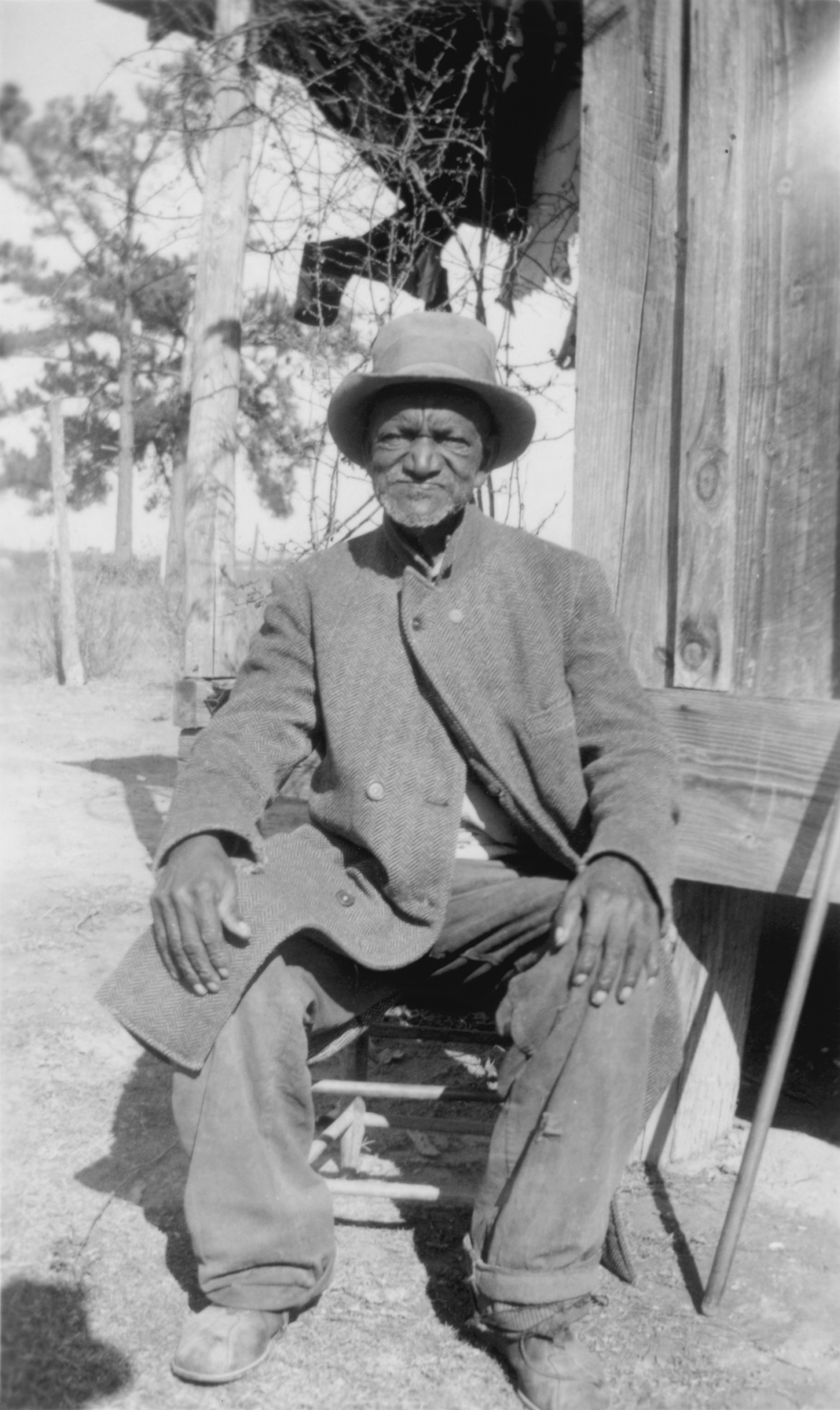
Wes Brady, ex-slave, Marshall, Texas, 1937. This photograph was taken as part of the Federal Writers' Project Slave Narrative Collection.

In its earliest form, the historiography of slavery in the United States focused primarily on official or plantation records, often reflecting contemporary racial biases. Early 20th-century accounts, like those of Ulrich B. Phillips, portrayed slavery as a benign institution.

However, beginning in the 1930s and especially after the 1940s, historians such as Kenneth M. Stampp shifted the focus toward the violence, exploitation, and dehumanization inherent in slavery, emphasizing the perspective of the slaves rather than the slaveholders. and in 1959 Stanley M. Elkins controversially compared the psychological impact of slavery on African Americans to that experienced by victims of Nazi concentration camps, suggesting that slavery created a "Sambo" stereotype of docility. The civil rights movement of the 1950s and 1960s accelerated this transformation bringing into the mainstream both the black historical scholarship of The Journal of Negro History as well as the Slave Narrative Collection collected in the 1930s.

The pendulum swung back in the 1970s with the economic analysis in Time on the Cross arguing that slavery was materially less harsh than previously depicted an analysis shared by the Marxist historian Eugene Genovese, but criticized for reviving elements of earlier paternalistic narratives.

In the 1970s and 1980s, historians like John Blassingame and Herbert Gutman emphasized the cultural, familial, and communal lives of slaves, highlighting both resilience and the limits of autonomy under slavery. More recent contributions, such as Steven Hahn’s A Nation under Our Feet, explore the political consciousness of slaves and their role in shaping post-emancipation society. Others, like Robert E. Wright, have introduced models to explain the economic logic behind the regional distribution and use of slave labor.

== Civil War ==
The Civil War has generated an unusually large historiography. In terms of controversy, historians have long debated the causes of the war, and the relative importance given to nationalism and sectionalism, slavery, and economic issues. Nationalism dominated historiography from the late 19th century and the 1920s, especially as reflected in the work of James Ford Rhodes. In the 1920s, the Beardian school Identified an inevitable conflict between the plantation-based South and the industrial Northeast. When the agrarian Midwest sided with the Northeast, war resulted. In the 1930s, numerous arguments were made that the war was not inevitable, that was caused by a failure of the political system to reach a compromise.

Since the 1960s, the emphasis has been very largely on slavery as the cause of the Civil War, with the anti-slavery element in the North committed to blocking the expansion of the slave system because it violated the rights of free white farmers and workers. Southerners responded to this as an intolerable attack on their honor, their economic needs for expansion, and the constitutional states' rights.

=== Lost Cause of the Confederacy ===
The Lost Cause is a collection of popular myths, strongest in the white South, which endorse the virtues of the antebellum South and embodied a view of the Civil War as an honorable struggle to maintain those virtues while downplaying the actual role of slavery. The Lost Cause was widely taught in schools across the South. In the late 19th century it became a key part of the reconciliation process between North and South, thereby reuniting the white South with the mainstream national interest. The Lost Cause became the main way that white Southerners commemorated the war. The United Daughters of the Confederacy by 1900 became the major organization promoting the Lost Cause. Historian Caroline E. Janney states:

Providing a sense of relief to white Southerners who feared being dishonored by defeat, the Lost Cause was largely accepted in the years following the war by white Americans who found it to be a useful tool in reconciling North and South.

The Lost Cause belief has several historically inaccurate elements. These include claiming that the reason the Confederacy started the Civil War was to defend state's rights rather than to preserve slavery, or claiming that slavery was benevolent, rather than cruel.

== Cold War ==
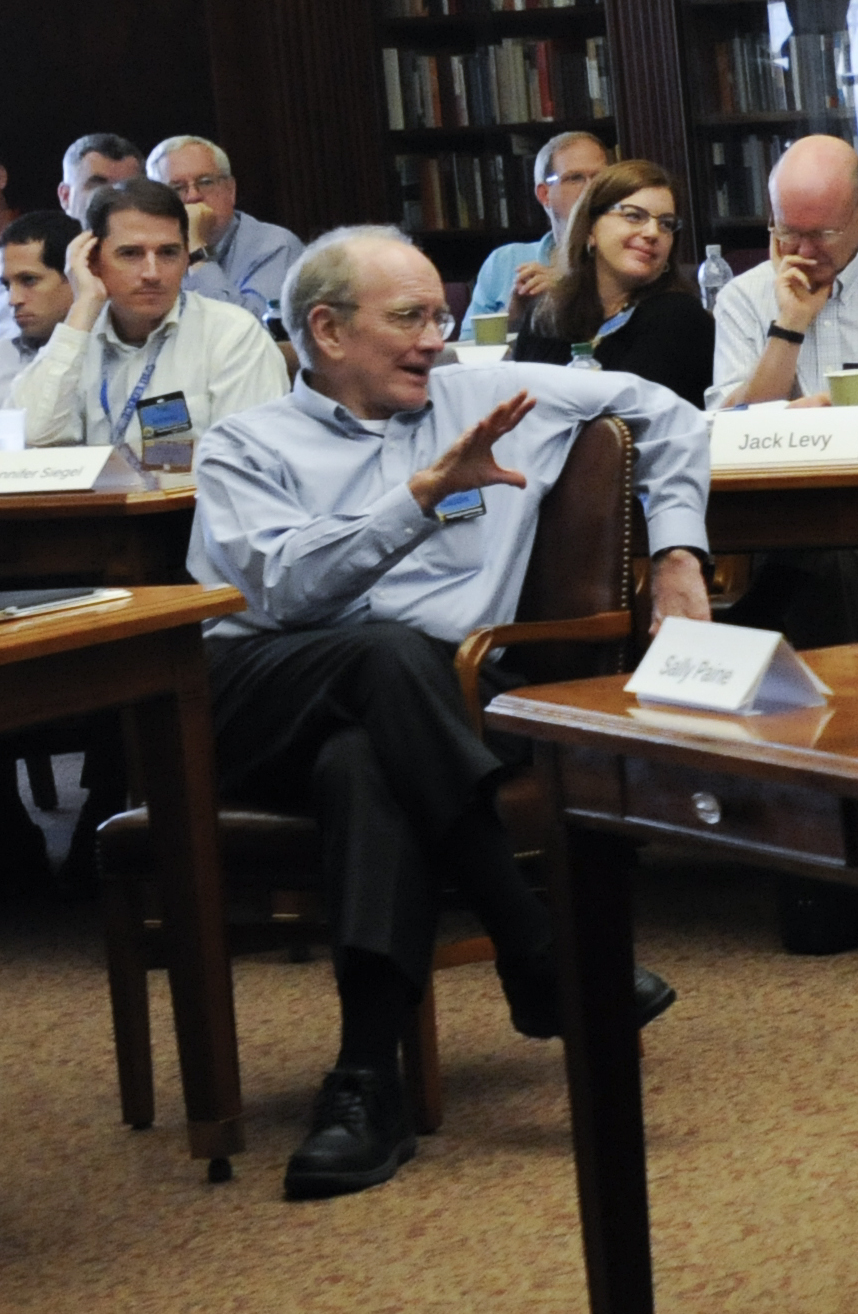
John Lewis Gaddis speaks to U.S. Naval War College (NWC) faculty in 2012

As soon as the "Cold War" began about 1947 the origins of the conflict between the Soviet Union and the West became a source of heated controversy among scholars and politicians. In particular, historians have sharply disagreed as to who was responsible for the breakdown of Soviet-U.S. relations after the Second World War; and whether the conflict between the two superpowers was inevitable, or could have been avoided. Historians have also disagreed on what exactly the Cold War was, what the sources of the conflict were, and how to disentangle patterns of action and reaction between the two sides. With the opening of the archives in Moscow and Eastern Europe after 1990, most of the pressing issues have been resolved.

The "orthodox" school dominated American historiography from the 1940s until it was challenged by both Wisconsin School and New Left historians in the 1960s. The orthodox school places the responsibility for the Cold War on the Soviet Union and its expansion into Eastern Europe. Thomas A. Bailey, for example, argued in his 1950 America Faces Russia that the breakdown of postwar peace was the result of Soviet expansionism in the immediate postwar years. Bailey argued Stalin violated promises he had made at Yalta, imposed Soviet-dominated regimes on unwilling Eastern European populations, and conspired to spread communism throughout the world. America responded by drawing the line against Soviet aggression with the Truman Doctrine, and the Marshall Plan.

The challengers, the "revisionist" school, were originally formed at the University of Wisconsin by William Appleman Williams. This strain of thought became most known via his The Tragedy of American Diplomacy (1959). Williams suggested America was just as bad as the Soviets because it had always been an empire-building nation, and forced capitalism upon unwilling nations. Revisionists emphasized Soviet weaknesses after 1945, said it only wanted a security zone, and was mostly responding to American provocations.

The seminal "post-revisionist" accounts are by John Lewis Gaddis, starting with his The United States and the Origins of the Cold War, 1941–1947 (1972) and continuing through his study of George F. Kennan: An American Life (2011). Gaddis argued that neither side bore sole responsibility, as he emphasized the constraints imposed on American policymakers by domestic politics. Gaddis criticized revisionist scholars, particularly Williams, for failing to understand the role of Soviet policy in the origins of the Cold War. Ernest R. May concluded in 1984, "The United States and the Soviet Union were doomed to be antagonists. ... There probably was never any real possibility that the post-1945 relationship could be anything but hostility verging on conflict ... Traditions, belief systems, propinquity, and convenience ... all combined to stimulate antagonism, and almost no factor operated in either country to hold it back."

== Social history ==
Social history, often called the new social history, is the history of ordinary people and their strategies of coping with life. It includes topics like demography, women, family, and education. It was a major growth field in the 1960s and 1970s among scholars, and still is well represented in history departments. In two decades from 1975 to 1995, the proportion of professors of history in American universities identifying with social history rose from 31% to 41%, while the proportion of political historians fell from 40% to 30%.

The Social Science History Association, formed in 1976, brings together scholars from numerous disciplines interested in social history and publishes Social Science History quarterly. The field is also the specialty of the Journal of Social History, edited since 1967 by Peter Stearns. It covers such topics as gender relations; race in American history; the history of personal relationships; consumerism; sexuality; the social history of politics; crime and punishment, and history of the senses. Most of the major historical journals have coverage as well.

Social history was practiced by local historians as well as scholars, especially the frontier historians who followed Frederick Jackson Turner, as well as urban historians who followed Arthur Schlesinger Sr. The "new" social history of the 1960s introduced demographic and quantitative techniques. However, after 1990 social history was increasingly challenged by cultural history, which emphasizes language and the importance of beliefs and assumptions and their causal role in group behavior.

=== Women's history ===
It is often thought that the field of American women's history became a major field of academic inquiry largely after the 1970s. However, the field has a longer historiography than is generally understood. The earliest histories of American women were authored during the 19th century, largely by non-academic women writers writing for popular audiences or to document the history of women's civic and activist organizations. For example, abolitionists Sarah Grimke and Lydia Maria Child wrote brief histories of women in the 1830s, while Elizabeth Ellet wrote, Women of the American Revolution (1848), A Domestic History of the American Revolution (1850), and Pioneer Women of the West (1852). Meanwhile, women's organizations like the Women's Christian Temperance Union and the National American Woman Suffrage Association and the National Association of Colored Women set about writing their own institutional histories in the late nineteenth and early twentieth century, while women's patriotic societies like the Daughters of the American Revolution and the United Daughters of the Confederacy created "filiopietistic" publications on history and women in history, developed school curricula, and engaged in historic preservation work. Both black and white women in women's clubs actively participated in this work during the twentieth century in their efforts to shape the broader culture. In the early twentieth century, for example, the United Daughters of the Confederacy (UDC) coordinated efforts across the South to tell the story of the Confederacy and its women on the Confederate home front, while male historians spent their time with battles and generals. The women emphasized female activism, initiative, and leadership. They reported that when all the men left for war, the women took command, found ersatz and substitute foods, rediscovered their old traditional skills with the spinning wheel when factory cloth became unavailable, and ran all the farm or plantation operations. They faced danger without having menfolk in the traditional role of their protectors. Historian Jacquelyn Dowd Hall argues that the UDC was a powerful promoter of women's history:

UDC leaders were determined to assert women's cultural authority over virtually every representation of the region's past. This they did by lobbying for state archives and museums, national historic sites, and historic highways; compiling genealogies; interviewing former soldiers; writing history textbooks; and erecting monuments, which now moved triumphantly from cemeteries into town centers. More than half a century before women's history and public history emerged as fields of inquiry and action, the UDC, with other women's associations, strove to etch women's accomplishments into the historical record and to take history to the people, from the nursery and the fireside to the schoolhouse and the public square.

While non-academic women in these societies succeeded in shaping public memory and history education in American school houses, albeit along racially segregated lines, the subject of women in American history was largely ignored within the historical discipline during the period in which the discipline professionalized from the 1880s to 1910. The male-dominated discipline saw its purview as relatively limited to the study of the evolution of politics, government, and the law, and emphasized research in official state documents, thus leaving little room for an examination of women's activities or lives. Women's activities were perceived as irretrievable, inadequately documented in the historical record, and occurring in the social and cultural realms. However, with the rise of progressive history in the 1910s and social history in the 1920s and 1930s, some professional historians began to call for more attention to the study of women in American history, or simply incorporated women into their broader historical studies. The most famous call to research and write about the history of American women in this period came from distinguished historian, Arthur Schlesinger Sr. in his collected essays published as New Perspectives in American History, in 1922. His graduate students and their graduate students would later contribute to the emergence of the scholarly field of American women's history in the ensuing decades. This phase in the field's development culminated in the creation of women's history archives at both Radcliffe College (Harvard's women's coordinate) and Smith College (The Sophia Smith Collection). The Arthur and Elizabeth Schlesinger Library on the History of Women in America (Harvard), for example, was founded in 1943 as the Radcliffe Woman's Archives. Between 1957 and 1971, this library produced a seminal scholarly reference work on women in American history, Notable American Women: A Biographical Dictionary, 1607–1950. It coordinated the work of hundreds of historians—men and women—and was published to widespread acclaim in 1971. Academic historians, meanwhile, sporadically produced and reviewed scholarly monographs in American women's history from the 1930s through the 1950s as well. The work of Alma Lutz, Elizabeth Anthony Dexter, Julia Cherry Spruill, Antoinette Elizabeth Taylor, Mary Elizabeth Massey, Caroline Ware, Eleanor Flexner, and Mary Beard for example, all focused on the history of American women and was relatively well known during their time even if some of these scholars did not enjoy insider status within the historical profession.

In response to the new social history of the 1960s and the modern women's movement, increasing numbers of scholars, especially women graduate students training in universities across the country, began to focus on the history of women. They struggled to find mentors in male dominated history departments initially. Students in the Columbia University History Department produced several early significant works in the 1960s. Gerda Lerner's dissertation, published as The Grimke Sisters of South Carolina in 1967, and Aileen Kraditor's The Ideas of the Woman Suffrage Movement (1965) are just two notable examples. Anne Firor Scott, a graduate of Harvard who studied under Oscar Handlin in the 1950s, wrote a dissertation on women in the Southern Progressive movement and by 1970 had published The Southern Lady: From the Pedestal to Politics. These new ventures into women's history were made within mainstream academic institutions. Lerner and Scott would become leading lights and organizers for the field's younger practitioners in the coming decades. Their contributions to American history were recognized by the Organization of American Historians and the Southern Historical Association when they were elected to the presidencies of those professional organizations in the 1980s.

The field of women's history exploded dramatically after 1969. New historians of women organized within the major national historical associations from 1969 forward to promote scholarship about women. This included the American Historical Association, the Organization of American History, and the Southern Historical Association. The mostly women historians created status of women committees in these male dominated associations and made developing women's history a major focus of their professional and intellectual activism. They started by gathering data and writing bibliographies in the field to identify areas in need of study. Then they painstakingly completed the research and produced the monographs that vitalized this field. They also created around a dozen regional women's history organizations and conference groups of their own to support their scholarly work and build intellectual and professional networks. These included the Coordinating Committee on Women in the Historical Profession—Conference Group on Women's History (1969), the Berkshire Conference on the History of Women (1973), West Coast Association of Women Historians (1970), Women Historians of the Midwest(1973), Southern Association for Women Historians (1970), Upstate New York Women's History Organization (1975), New England Association of Women Historians (1972), Association of Black Women Historians (1979), and others.

The scholarship this growing cohort of historians created was soon vast, diverse, and theoretically complex. Almost from its inception, the new women's history of the 1970s focused on the differential experiences of white women of diverse backgrounds, women of color, working-class women, relations of power between men and women, and how to integrate women's history into mainstream American history narratives. There was a pervasive concern with understanding the impact of race, class, gender, and sexuality on the histories of women—despite later claims to the contrary. By the late 1970s and early 1980s, American women's historians like Elizabeth Fox-Genovese and Joan Kelley were considering sexual relations of power, sex roles, the problem of fitting women's history into traditional frameworks of periodization and Joan Wallach Scott's call to apply gender as a "Useful Category of Historical Analysis." In the U.S., historians of women in Europe, America, and the World collaborated by working together in the discipline's professional institutions and sharing one another's theoretical insights to strengthen the standing of women's history in academia broadly.

An important development of the 1980s was the fuller integration of women into the history of race and slavery and race into the history of women. This work was preceded by the work of black club women, historic preservationists, archivists, and educators of the early twentieth century. Gerda Lerner published a significant document reader, Black Women in White America in 1972 (Pantheon Publishers). Deborah Gray White's Ar'n't I a Woman? Female Slaves in the Plantation South (1985), helped to open up analysis of race, slavery, abolitionism and feminism, as well as resistance, power, activism, and themes of violence, sexualities, and the body. The professional service and scholarship of Darlene Clark Hine, Rosalyn Terborg -Penn, and Nell Irvin Painter on African American women also broke important ground in the 1980s and 1990s.

By the late 1980s, women's history in the United States had matured and proliferated enough to support its own stand alone scholarly journals to showcase scholarship in the field. The major women's history journal published in the United States is The Journal of Women's History, launched in 1989 by Joan Hoff and Christie Farnham Pope. It was first published out of Indiana University and continues to be published quarterly today. Indeed, the field became so prolific and established by the turn of the 21st century that it had become one of the most commonly claimed fields of specialization of all professional historians in the United States, according to Robert Townsend of the American Historical Association. Major trends in the history of American women in recent years have emphasized the study of global and transnational histories of women, and histories of conservative women.

Women's history continues to be a robust and prolific field in the United States, and new scholarship is published regularly in the history discipline's mainstream, regional, and subfield specific journals.

=== Urban history ===
Urban history has long been practiced by amateurs who from the late 19th century have written detailed histories of their own cities. Academic interest began with Arthur Schlesinger Sr. at Harvard in the 1920s, and his successor Oscar Handlin. The "new urban history" emerged in the 1960s as a branch of Social history seeking to understand the "city as process" and, through quantitative methods, to learn more about the inarticulate masses in the cities, as opposed to the mayors and elites. Much of the attention is devoted to individual behavior, and how the intermingling of classes and ethnic groups operated inside a particular city. Smaller cities are much easier to handle when it comes to tracking a sample of individuals over ten or 20 years.

Common themes include the social and political changes, examinations of class formation, and racial/ethnic tensions. A major early study was Stephan Thernstrom's Poverty and Progress: Social Mobility in a Nineteenth Century City (1964), which used census records to study Newburyport, Massachusetts, 1850–1880. A seminal, landmark book, it sparked interest in the 1960s and 1970s in quantitative methods, census sources, "bottom-up" history, and the measurement of upward social mobility by different ethnic groups.

Rather than being strictly areas of geographical segmentation, spatial patterns and concepts of place reveal the struggles for power of various social groups, including gender, class, race, and ethnic identity. The spatial patterns of residential and business areas give individual cities their distinct identities and, considering the social aspects attendant to the patterns, create a more complete picture of how those cities evolved, shaping the lives of their citizens. Recent techniques include the use of historical GIS data.

== Teaching ==
The great majority of leading scholars have been teachers at universities and colleges. However, professionalization and the academic advancement system gives priority to graduate-level research and publication, and to the teaching of advanced graduate students. Issues regarding the teaching at the undergraduate level or below have been promoted by the associations, but have not become main themes.

American studies was seldom taught in Europe or Asia before the Second World War. Since then, American studies has had a limited appeal and typically involves a combination of American literature and some history. Europe's approach has been highly sensitive to the changes in the political climate.

== Prominent historians working in the U.S. ==
=== Historians born before 1900 ===
- Henry Brooks Adams, (1838–1918), US 1800–1816
- Charles McLean Andrews, (1863–1943), colonial
- Harry Elmer Barnes, (1889–1958), World wars
- George Bancroft, (1800–1891), colonial and Revolution
- Hubert Howe Bancroft, (1832–1918), West
- Eugene C. Barker (1874–1956), Texas
- Charles A. Beard, (1874–1948), political, economic and social
- Mary Ritter Beard, (1876–1958), social
- Samuel Flagg Bemis, (1891–1973), diplomatic
- Bruce Catton, (1899–1978), Civil War
- Edward Channing, (1856–1931), political
- E. Merton Coulter, (1890–1981), South
- Avery Craven, (1885–1980), Civil War
- Merle Curti, (1897–1997), intellectual, social, peace
- Angie Debo, (1890–1988), Native American and Oklahoma history
- Bernard DeVoto, (1897–1955), West
- W.E.B. Du Bois, (1868–1963), Reconstruction
- Walter L. Fleming, (1874–1932), Reconstruction
- Douglas Southall Freeman (1886–1953), Washington, Lee
- Richard Hildreth, (1807–1865), political
- J. Franklin Jameson (1859–1937), editor and archivist
- Leonard Woods Labaree, (1897–1980), editor of the Benjamin Franklin Papers
- Dumas Malone, (1892–1986), Jefferson
- Samuel Eliot Morison, (1887–1976) naval, American colonial
- Allan Nevins, (1890–1971), political and business; Civil War; biography
- John Gorham Palfrey, (1796–1881), New England
- Francis Parkman (1832–1893), Canada, French and Indian wars
- James Parton, (1822–1891), political biography
- James Ford Rhodes, (1848–1927) Civil War, Reconstruction, and Gilded Age
- Hester Dorsey Richardson (1862–1933), biography, Maryland
- Theodore Roosevelt, (1858–1919), West, naval
- George Sarton, (1884–1956), history of science
- Arthur Schlesinger Sr. (1888–1965), social, urban
- James Schouler, (1839–1920) political
- Justin Harvey Smith, (1857–1930) Mexican–American War
- Frederick Jackson Turner, (1861–1932), West, methodology
- Charles H. Wesley, (1891–1987) black history
- Woodrow Wilson, (1856-1924), pre-Colonial America to the early 20th century
- Justin Winsor, (1831–1897), 18th century
- Carter G. Woodson, (1875–1950) black history

=== Historians born in the 20th century ===
- Gar Alperovitz, (born 1936), Cold War
- Stephen Ambrose, (1936–2002), WW2, U.S. political
- Joyce Appleby (1929–2016), capitalism, early national
- Herbert Aptheker, (1915–2003), African American
- Leonard J. Arrington, (1917–1999), Mormons
- Thomas A. Bailey, (1902–1983), diplomacy
- Bernard Bailyn, (1922–2020), colonial; Atlantic history
- K. Jack Bauer, (1926–1987), U.S. naval, military, and maritime
- Michael Beschloss, (born 1955), Cold War
- Ray Allen Billington, (1903–1981), Frontier and West
- David Blight, (born 1949), slavery
- John Morton Blum, (1921–2011), presidents
- Daniel J. Boorstin, (1914–2004), legal, social
- Paul S. Boyer, (1935–2012), culture
- Alan Brinkley, (1949–2019), 20th century
- David Brody, (born 1930), labor
- James MacGregor Burns, (1918–2014), World War II, FDR
- Richard Bushman, (born 1931), colonial, Mormons
- Jon Butler, (born 1940), religion, colonial
- Richard Carwardine, (born 1947) political, religious; Lincoln
- Alfred D. Chandler Jr., (1918–2007), business
- Ron Chernow, (born 1949), biography, business
- Elizabeth Clark-Lewis, slavery, emancipation, domestic labor
- Edward M. Coffman, (1929–2020), military
- Henry Steele Commager, (1902–98), intellectual
- John Milton Cooper (born 1940), Woodrow Wilson
- Lawrence A. Cremin, (1925–1990), education
- William Cronon, (born 1954), environmental
- Robert Dallek, (born 1934), politics, diplomacy
- David B. Danbom (born 1947), rural
- David Brion Davis, (1927–2019), Slavery
- Kenneth S. Davis, (1912–1999), Franklin D. Roosevelt
- Carl N. Degler, (1921–2014), social
- David Herbert Donald, (1920–2009), Civil War
- A. Hunter Dupree, (1921–2019), science and technology
- Stanley Elkins, (1925–2013), slavery, federalism
- Joseph J. Ellis, (born 1943), early Republic
- Niall Ferguson, (born 1964), military, business, economic, imperial
- David Hackett Fischer, (born 1935) American Revolution, cycles
- Robert Fogel, (1926–2013), economic, cliometrics, slavery
- Eric Foner, (born 1943), Reconstruction
- Shelby Foote, (1916–2005), Civil War
- Elizabeth Fox-Genovese, (1941–2007), South; cultural & social, women
- John Hope Franklin, (1915–2009), black history
- Frank Freidel, (1916–1993), Franklin Roosevelt
- John Lewis Gaddis, (born 1941), Cold War
- Lloyd Gardner (born 1934), diplomatic
- John Garraty, (1920–2007), biography
- Edwin Gaustad (1923–2011), religion in America
- Eugene Genovese, (1930–2012), South, slavery, religion
- Doris Kearns Goodwin, (born 1943), presidential
- Paul Gottfried, (born 1941), conservatism, modern Europe
- Lillian Guerra, Cuban and Latin American history
- Arnold Hirsch, (born 1949), urban, New Orleans, modern
- Richard Hofstadter, (1916–1970), political, historiography
- Daniel Walker Howe, (born 1937), political, intellectual
- Kenneth T. Jackson, (born 1939), urban, New York City
- Merrill Jensen (1905–1980), American Revolution
- Michael Kazin, (born 1948), political
- George F. Kennan, (1904–2005), U.S. and Russia
- David Kennedy (born 1941), 20th century
- Daniel J. Kevles, (born 1939), science
- Walter LaFeber (1933–2021), diplomatic
- Robert Leckie, (1920–2001), American military
- William Leuchtenburg (born 1922), American political and legal
- Leon F. Litwack (1929–2021), African-American
- Walter Lord (1917–2002), American, popular
- George Marsden, (born 1939), Christianity and American culture; Evangelicalism
- Forrest McDonald, (1927–2016), early national, presidency, business
- Pauline Maier, (1938–2013), American revolution
- William Manchester, (1922–2004), World War II
- David McCullough, (1933–2022), presidents
- William S. McFeely, (1930–2019), Civil War and Reconstruction
- James M. McPherson, (born 1936), Civil War
- D. W. Meinig (1924–2020), American geography
- Russell Menard, Colonial, demographic
- Perry Miller, (1905–1963), intellectual
- Edmund Morgan (1916–2013), colonial and Revolution
- David Nasaw (born 1945), Progressive Era
- George H. Nash, (born 1945), conservatism; Herbert Hoover
- Mark A. Noll, (born 1946), Christianity in the United States
- James T. Patterson (born 1935), 20th-century political
- Bradford Perkins (1925–2008), U.S. diplomatic
- Gordon W. Prange (1910–1980), World War II
- Jack N. Rakove (born 1947), US Constitution and early politics
- Robert V. Remini, (1921–2013), ante-bellum politics
- Richard Rhodes (born 1937), nuclear weapons
- W.J. Rorabaugh (born 1945), 19th and 20th century and frontier
- Charles E. Rosenberg (born 1936), medicine and science
- Leila J. Rupp (born 1950), feminism
- Cornelius Ryan, (1920–1974), World War II, popular
- Thomas J. Sugrue, (born 1962), urban
- Arthur Schlesinger Jr. (1917–2007), Andrew Jackson, New Deal, Kennedys, politics
- Kathryn Kish Sklar, (born 1939), women's history of the United States
- Theda Skocpol (born 1947), institutions and comparative method; sociological
- Richard Slotkin (born 1942), environment & West; literature
- Henry Nash Smith, (1906–1996), cultural, American Studies
- Jean Edward Smith, (1932–2019), biography,
- Richard Norton Smith, (born 1953), presidential
- Kenneth Stampp, (1912–2009), South, slavery
- Ronald Takaki, (1939–2009), ethnic studies
- Stephan Thernstrom, (born 1934), new social history
- George Tindall, (1921–2006), South
- John Toland, (1912–2004), world wars
- Ralph E. Turner (1893–1964), cultural anthropology
- Laurel Thatcher Ulrich, (born 1938), early America
- Robert M. Utley, (1929–2022), 19th-century American West
- J. Samuel Walker, nuclear energy and weapons
- Russell Weigley, (1930–2004), military
- Richard White, (born 1947), American West, environmental, Native American
- Sean Wilentz, (born 1951), political, cultural
- William Appleman Williams, (1921–1990), diplomatic
- Clyde N. Wilson, (born 1941), 19th-century South
- Gordon S. Wood, (1933–2026), American Revolution
- C. Vann Woodward, (1908–1999), South
- Howard Zinn, (1922–2010), People's history
- Anthony J. Cade II, (born 1988), American Military History

== American historians working in U.S. on non-U.S. topics ==
Research and teaching history in the United States has, of course, included the history of Europe and the rest of the world as well. So many topics are covered that is possible only to list some of the outstanding scholars.

- Carl L. Becker, (1873–1945), modern Europe
- Elizabeth A. R. Brown, (born 1932), medieval
- Geoffrey Bruun (1899–1988), European civilization
- Louis R. Gottschalk, (1899–1975), French Revolution
- Clarence H. Haring, (1885–1960), Latin American
- Charles H. Haskins, (1870–1937), medieval
- Alfred Thayer Mahan, (1840–1914), naval
- Lawrence Henry Gipson, (1882–1970), British Empire before 1775
- William L. Langer, (1896–1977), European diplomatic
- John Lothrop Motley, (1814–1877), Netherlands
- Lewis Mumford, (1895–1988), urban
- William H. Prescott (1796–1859), Spain
- Jacques Barzun, (1907–2012), cultural
- John Boswell, (1947–1994), Medieval
- Peter Brown, (born 1935), Medieval
- Christopher Browning, (born 1944), Holocaust
- Gordon A. Craig, (1913–2005), German, diplomatic
- Robert Darnton, (born 1939), 18th-century France
- Lucy Dawidowicz, (1915–1990), Holocaust
- Natalie Zemon Davis, (1928–2023), early modern France, film
- Trevor Dupuy, (1916–1995) military
- John K. Fairbank, (1907–1991), China
- Saul Friedländer, (born 1932), Holocaust
- Francis Fukuyama, (born 1955), world
- Peter Gay (1923–2015), psychohistory, Enlightenment, modern Europe
- Alfred Gollin (1926–2005), 20th-century Europe
- John Hattendorf, (born 1941), maritime and naval
- John Whitney Hall, (1916–1997), Japan
- Victor Davis Hanson, (born 1953), ancient warfare
- Gertrude Himmelfarb, (1922–2019), 19th-century British
- Hajo Holborn, (1902–1969), Germany
- Tony Judt, (1948–2010), 20th-century Europe
- Donald Kagan, (1932–2021), ancient Greek
- Paul Kennedy, (born 1945), world, military
- Claudia Koonz (born 1940), Nazi Germany
- Thomas Kuhn, (1922–1996), science
- John Lukacs, (1924–2019), 20th-century Europe
- Ramsay MacMullen, (1928–2022), Roman
- Charles S. Maier, (born 1939), 20th century
- William McNeill, (1917–2016), World
- Arno J. Mayer (1926–2023), World War I and Europe
- George Mosse (1918–1999), German, Jewish, fascism
- Geoffrey Parker (born 1943), early modern military
- Richard Pipes (1923–2018), Russian
- J. G. A. Pocock (1924–2023), early modern Europe
- Nicholas V. Riasanovsky (1923–2011), Russian
- Theodore Ropp (1911–2000), military
- Carl Schorske (1915–2015), European intellectual
- Paul W. Schroeder (1927–2020), European diplomacy
- Joan Scott, (born 1941), Feminism
- James J. Sheehan (born 1937), modern German
- Dennis Showalter (1942–2019), military
- Timothy D. Snyder (born 1969), World War II
- Jonathan Spence, (born 1936), China
- Jackson J. Spielvogel, (born 1939), world
- Robert C. Tucker, (1918–2010), Stalin
- Eugen Weber (1925–2007), modern French
- Gerhard Weinberg (born 1928), World War II
- John B. Wolf, (1907–1996), early modern French
- Gordon Wright, (1912–2000), Modern French
