= Political history in the United States =

Political history in the United States covers the historiography or the methods used by political historians, political scientists, and other scholars in analyzing the history of politics in the United States.

== Traditional political history ==
Around 1880-1920, wide-ranging non-academic historians, such as George Bancroft and James Ford Rhodes, focused on durable institutions, especially the presidency, Congress, and the two main political parties. Traditional political history focused on major leaders and long played a dominant role beyond academic historians in the United States. The popularity of these writers was due to their literary style, storytelling abilities, and their willingness to draw lessons from history for the reader. They examined constitutions, platforms, rhetoric, and legislation to determine what was good or bad for the country. They excelled at biography and revealed the strengths, passions, and fatal flaws of historical figures. Modern scholarship is hesitant to make judgments about what "should" have been done at critical moments, and those who do base their judgments on the values of historical actors rather than specific actions.

Starting with Edward Channing at Harvard in the early 20th century, the new university departments of history adopted much of the old style. What was new was a demand for finished PhD dissertations, a deemphasis on drama and color, and an insistence on using primary sources, as tracked through footnotes. The academics wrote for each other, with tenure as a reward, not for sales to a popular audience. These studies of U.S. political history accounted for about 25% of all the scholarly books and articles written by American historians before 1950, and about 33% into the 1960s, followed by books and articles on diplomacy.

=== Biographies ===
Political biographers tended to be more inclined towards moralizing judgments compared to other political historians. However, before the mid-1920s, scholarly biography was not a widely popular genre in the United States. It wasn't until Allen Johnson, Dumas Malone, and the editorial board of the Dictionary of American Biography enlisted hundreds of academic historians to write brief articles on notable figures that scholarly biography gained momentum. Allan Nevins, a prominent contributor to the Dictionary, wrote prize-winning full-length biographies and also initiated a successful series of political biographies in the 1930s. The title of Nevins' most outstanding work, Grover Cleveland: a Study in Courage, epitomized the moralizing tendency of the genre, while arguing that heroes had to be understood in their deeper historical context. By the late 1940s numerous accomplished scholars had launched multi-volume biographies of significant political figures, intending to illustrate how men maintained a balance between power and responsibility, rather than describing the moral essence of politics.

- Tenured academic authors of two or more biographies of political leaders: Stephen E. Ambrose, Carl L. Becker, H. W. Brands, Alan Brinkley, James MacGregor Burns, John M. Cooper, Robert Dallek, David Herbert Donald, Frank Freidel, Lewis L. Gould, Fred Greenstein, Richard Hofstadter, Arthur S. Link, Allan Nevins, Vernon Louis Parrington, Robert V. Remini, Arthur M. Schlesinger Jr., Jean Edward Smith, Sean Wilentz, and Ronald C. White.
- Independent scholars with two or more biographies of political leaders: Charles A. Beard, Albert J. Beveridge, Irving Brant, Robert Caro, Ron Chernow, Claude Fuess, Doris Kearns Goodwin, Burton J. Hendrick, Marquis James, Margaret Leech, David McCullough, Jon Meacham, Edmund Morris, and Henry F. Pringle.

Political scientists have very largely avoided biography. However in their studies of leadership, especially presidents and prime ministers, they have given some attention to the careers and political skills of leaders.

=== Charles Beard's economic interpretation ===
By the 1950s, Beard's economic interpretation of history had fallen out of favor; only a few prominent historians held to his view of class conflict as a primary driver in American history, such as Howard K. Beale and C. Vann Woodward. Still, as a leader of the "progressive historians", or "progressive historiography", Beard introduced themes of economic self-interest and class conflict regarding the adoption of the Constitution His study of the financial interests of the drafters of the United States Constitution (An Economic Interpretation of the Constitution) seemed radical in 1913 since he proposed that it was a product of economically-determinist landholding Founding Fathers. He saw ideology as a product of economic interests.

==== Beard's Constitution ====
The historian Carl L. Becker's History of Political Parties in the Province of New York, 1760–1776 (1909) formulated the progressive interpretation of the American Revolution. He said that there were two revolutions: one against Britain to obtain home rule and the other to determine who should rule at home.

Beard argued in his works An Economic Interpretation of the Constitution of the United States (1913) and An Economic Interpretation of Jeffersonian Democracy (1915) that the Constitution was set up by rich bondholders against farmers and planters. According to Beard, the Constitution was designed to reverse the democratic tendencies unleashed by the Revolution among the common people, especially farmers and debtors. Beard's interpretation was challenged by historians who argued that economic interests were decisive but that Beard had misinterpreted the economic interests involved. Instead of two conflicting interests, critics identified dozens of different economic interests operating at cross purposes, which forced the delegates to bargain.

By the 1950s, Beard's economic interpretation of history, which emphasized economic self-interest and especially class conflict as drivers of historical events, was rejected by the great majority of historians. By the 1980s it was replaced chiefly by the notion that a new idea republicanism swept the colonies and caused the Patriots to reject rule by the British monarchy and aristocracy.

=== New political history ===
The arrival in the 1960s and 1970s of a new interest in social history led to the emergence of the "new political history" which saw young scholars put much more emphasis on the voters' behavior and motivation, rather than just the politicians. It relied heavily on quantitative methods to integrate social themes, especially regarding ethnicity and religion. The new social science approach was a harbinger of the fading away of interest in Great Men.

=== Decline in late 20th century ===
The eclipse of traditional political approaches during the 1970s was a major shock, though diplomatic history fell even further. It was upstaged by social history, with a race/class/gender model. The number of political articles submitted to the Journal of American History fell by half from 33% to 15%. Patterson argued that contemporary events, especially the Vietnam War and Watergate, alienated younger scholars away from the study of politicians and their deeds. Political history never disappeared, but it never recovered its dominance among scholars, despite its sustained high popularity among the reading public. Some political historians made fun of their own predicament, as when William Leuchtenburg wrote, "the status of the political historians within the profession has sunk to somewhere between that of a faith healer and a chiropractor. Political historians were all right in a way, but you might not want to bring one home to meet the family." Others were more analytical, as when Hugh Davis Graham observed:

The ranks of traditional political historians are depleted, their assumptions and methods discredited, along with the Great White Man whose careers they chronicled.

=== Recent trends ===
According to Michael Kazin, in the 21st century, scholars have moved away from solely studying the American side of US politics and instead have adopted a "transnational" perspective, challenging the idea that the US is disconnected from global political trends. Historians now apply a broader definition of politics, including popular ideology, social movements, war, education, crime, sexuality, and the reciprocal influence of mass culture. Scholars from other fields, such as political science and law, have also shown an increasing interest in American history, and books about past presidents and politics are popular.

== Antipartisanship ==
According to historian Stuart M. Blumin, Americans show a long history of antiparty sentiment from the Constitution's ratification to the 21st century. Initially, the Founding Fathers criticized the idea of organized competitive political parties. Such parties contradicted classical republican principles of virtuous leaders acting in the public interest rather than selfish gain. Nevertheless, parties emerged in the mid-1790s in the form of the Federalist Party led by Alexander Hamilton, versus the Republican Party led by Thomas Jefferson and James Madison. Scholars call it the First Party System. After 1800, the Federalist steadily weakened, especially in the west and South, while the Republicans, or Democratic - Republican Party - became increasingly dominant. By the 1830s and 1840s, the Second Party System became dominant, with the new Democratic Party showing a small advantage over the new Whig party. Anti party partisan sentiment was a strong factor among the Whigs, while the Democrats emphasized loyalty to the party standard and rewarded compliance. However, the growing emphasis on patronage eroded the republican character of each party, leading to political corruption which stimulated anti-party sentiments. In the 21st century, conventional anti-party themes remain compelling in political discourse, with a growing trend towards independent voter registration and nonpartisanship.

== See also ==
- Political history, for Britain and other countries
- Party systems in the United States
- American election campaigns in the 19th century
- Political parties in the United States
- List of United States political catchphrases, slogans and rhetoric
  - List of United States presidential campaign slogans
- Scholars
  - Charles A. Beard
  - Walter Dean Burnham
  - V.O. Key Jr.
  - William E. Leuchtenburg
  - Richard P. McCormick
  - Allan Nevins
  - Arthur M. Schlesinger Jr.
  - Warren Miller (political scientist), data archives ICPSR
