= Ralph Turner =

Ralph Turner may refer to:

- Ralph E. Turner (1893–1964), American historian
- Ralph H. Turner (1919–2014), American sociologist
- Ralph Lilley Turner (1888–1983), British philologist
- Ralph Turner (sprinter) (born 1942), American sprinter, 1966 NCAA 4 × 100 m runner-up for the BYU Cougars track and field team
