= The Empire Strikes Out =

2010 book by Robert Elias

- Author: Elias, Robert
- Language: English
- Publisher: The New Press
- Publication date: 2010
- Publication place: United States
- Media type: Print (Hardcover)
- Pages: 418
- ISBN: 978-1-59558-195-2
- Dewey Decimal: 796.357-dc22
- LC Class: GV867.64.E45 2010

The Empire Strikes Out: How Baseball Sold U.S. Foreign Policy and Promoted the American Way Abroad is a 2010 book written by Robert Elias that examines baseball as part of American politics and foreign policy. Elias is the author of several books dealing with politics to include Baseball and the American Dream, which, in a similar manner to The Empire Strikes Out, examines the game of baseball through a political lens. Elias has also written a baseball novel titled, The Deadly Tools of Ignorance.

== The author ==
Robert Elias is a professor of politics and chair of legal studies at the University of San Francisco. Among the courses he teaches are U.S. political history, human rights, constitutional law, American foreign policy, and baseball. Elias' education includes a B.A. from the University of Pennsylvania, and an M.A. and Ph.D. from Penn State University. He is the author of numerous books, essays, and articles and is the Editor in Chief of Peace Review: A Journal of Social Justice. Elias has also taught at the University of California, Tufts University, the University of Maryland, and Penn State University. He lives in Mill Valley, California.

== Book summary ==
The Empire Strikes Out examines baseball's role in developing what the author refers to as the "American empire". The book discusses in great detail baseball's role in American history, particularly baseball's role helping, and being helped by the military. In the book's introduction, Elias notes that baseball was used to "...sell and export the American dream". As part of that effort, baseball was regularly used in the country's imperial quest to dominate other nations. A large part of the book is devoted to discussing foreign trips by American baseball teams intended to spread the game to other cultures. The first trip cited in the book was organized by Albert Spalding in 1888 and included stops in Egypt, Italy, England, and Ireland. According to Elias, the tour was "...permeated by racism". Previously, U.S. Commodore Matthew C. Perry had forced the opening of Japanese society and had introduced the game of baseball to Japanese people who quickly took to the sport. Closer to the U.S., the American military introduced baseball to Cuba and discovered that the Cuban people adopted the game largely as way of creating a national sport not played by Spain which was occupying the country as an imperial power. Elias frequently discusses baseball through the lenses of:

- Racism. The issues of race and racism are used extensively in the book. Elias writes considerably about the Major League Baseball's exclusion of black ballplayers. The book discusses Branch Rickey's signing of Jackie Robinson, as a way of destroying the Negro leagues.

"...as Brooklyn Dodgers' owner, Rickey invaded black America, extracting the best talent from the Negro Leagues and ultimately destroying them leaving widespread black ballplayer employment in his wake. With black teams eliminated, their fans were also co-opted by the major leagues."

Elias is also critical of teams such as the Cleveland Indians and Atlanta Braves for their use of American Indian nicknames, themes and mascots. (Note: The Cleveland Indians were renamed the Cleveland Guardians in late 2021.)

- Imperialism. Similar to racism, Elias repeatedly discusses baseball as a tool of American imperialism. An entire section is devoted to the topic of America's imperial quests in the far east and South America and how those quests were aided and abetted by the game of baseball. Japan, in particular is mentioned as an example of America's imperial quests both before and after World War II. The Dominican Republic is cited as an example of how baseball was introduced by American corporations as a way to divert the attention of native populations away from the oppressive working conditions that existed in the sugar industry. In a more contemporary example, Elias notes that American soldiers teaching Afghans how to play baseball was yet another example of baseball's contribution and linkage with America's cultural imperialism.

== Reviews ==
With the exception of The Washington Post, Elias's book was not widely reviewed in national print publications but has been reviewed in various on-line sites that focus on books, baseball, or a combination of both. Traditional and on-line media outlets, combined, offered mixed reviews of the book. Some reviewers lauded Elias' exhaustive research dating back well over 100 years as well as his ability to craft a political argument using sports as a metaphor while others criticized the book's strident tone.

"Before proceeding further I must say that to a large extent, though not completely, I agree with his take on the histories of both the United States and baseball, not because he convinced me, but because I already had arrived there on my own. That said I still found some of his conclusions overdrawn. That and the necessary complexity of the argument are what makes for the daunting narrative. One of the jacket blurbs proclaims that the book "should be required reading for anyone who considers themselves (sic) a baseball fan ..." Well maybe, but I can imagine, indeed I know, some ardent baseball fans who will toss the book aside without finishing it."

"The Empire Strikes Out" is an exceptionally ambitious history of the relationship between US foreign policy and our national pastime. Robert Elias demonstrates that as early as 1888, when Albert Spalding organized a tour designed to thrill people around the world with the game that was increasing his fortune, baseball's relationship to this nation's empire-building was already profitable and mutually satisfactory. Elias's catalog of the contemporary relationship between politics and baseball is no less damning. He convincingly demonstrates the cynicism of politicians who have used their temporary association with America's game to encourage support for campaigns of conquest and criminal wars.

"The book's sprawling approach leads to occasional misfires. Elias' claim that "baseball is Canada's national pastime" would surprise the millions of Canadians ... and after likening "The Bad News Bears" to the Vietnam War, he incongruously asks, "Was it a coincidence that the film came out the same week U.S. Lieutenant William Calley was finalizing his appeals against charges of war crimes in the My Lai massacre?"

"Robert Elias seems to hate America and hate baseball. His disdain oozes from every page of this tirade called "The Empire Strikes Out." In just one example of his ideological intolerance, he accuses the major leagues of "adopting an often militaristic and jingoistic nationalism that sometimes makes baseball into merely an extension of the government or armed forces. This blind patriotism has linked baseball with policies that have put the game in a bad light." So if you think the rise of the home run reflects a country "addicted" to projecting power on the world stage, if you think the export of baseball has produced an "American nightmare" for many foreign-born players, if you think the World Series "became infected with machismo" and shouldn't even be called the World Series because other countries play the game, too, then this book is for you. It's not for me."
