= Progressive historians =

The Progressive historians were a group of 20th century historians of the United States associated with a historiographical tradition that embraced an economic interpretation of American history. Most prominent among these was Charles A. Beard, who was influential in academia and with the general public.

== History ==
From 1910 to the 1940s, "Progressive" historiography was dominant, especially in political studies. It stressed the central importance of class conflict in American history. Important leaders included Vernon L. Parrington, Carl L. Becker, Arthur M. Schlesinger, Sr., John Hicks, and C. Vann Woodward. The movement established a strong base at the History Department at the University of Wisconsin with Curtis Nettels, William Hesseltine, Merle Curti, Howard K. Beale, Merrill Jensen, Fred Harvey Harrington (who became the university president), William Appleman Williams, and a host of graduate students. Charles A. Beard was the most prominent representative with his "Beardian" approach that reached both scholars and the general public.

In covering the Civil War, Charles and Mary Beard did not find it useful to examine nationalism, unionism, states' rights, slavery, abolition or the motivations of soldiers in battle. Instead, they proclaimed it was a:

social cataclysm in which the capitalists, laborers, and farmers of the North and West drove from power in the national government the planting aristocracy of the South. Viewed under the light of universal history, the fighting was a fleeting incident; the social revolution was the essential portentous outcome.... The Second American Revolution, while destroying the economic foundation of the slave-owning aristocracy, assured the triumph of business enterprise.

Arthur Schlesinger, Jr. wrote The Age of Jackson (1945), one of the last major books from this viewpoint. Schlesinger made Jackson a hero for his successful attacks on the Second Bank of the United States. His own views were clear enough: "Moved typically by personal and class, rarely by public, considerations, the business community has invariably brought national affairs to a state of crisis and exasperated the rest of society into dissatisfaction bordering on revolt."
