= Charles A. Beard =

American historian (1874–1948)

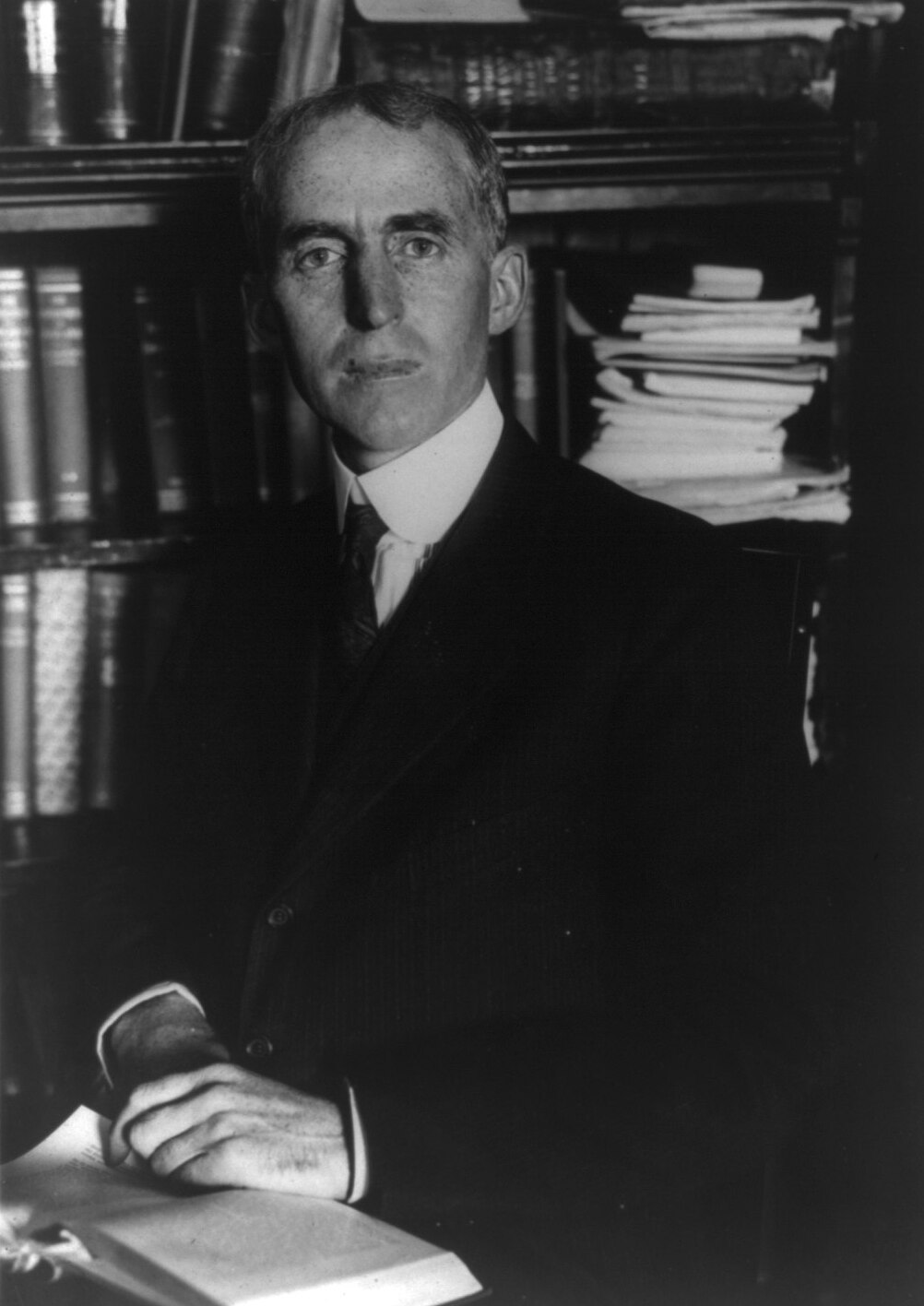
- Beard in 1917
- Born: Charles Austin Beard; November 27, 1874; Knightstown, Indiana, U.S.
- Died: September 1, 1948 (aged 73); New Haven, Connecticut, U.S.
- Spouse: Mary Ritter Beard (m. 1900)

Academic background
- Education: DePauw University; University of Oxford; Columbia University
- Thesis: The Office of Justice of the Peace in England (1904)
- Academic advisor: Frederick York Powell

Academic work
- Discipline: History; political science
- School or tradition: Progressive historiography
- Notable works: An Economic Interpretation of the Constitution of the United States (1913); The Rise of American Civilization (1927)
- Influenced: William Appleman Williams

Charles Austin Beard (November 27, 1874 – September 1, 1948) was an American historian and professor, who wrote primarily during the first half of the 20th century. A history professor at Columbia University, Beard's influence is primarily due to his publications in the fields of history and political science. His works included a radical re-evaluation of the Founding Fathers of the United States, whom he believed to be more motivated by economics than by philosophical principles. Beard's most influential book, An Economic Interpretation of the Constitution of the United States (1913), has been the subject of great controversy ever since its publication. While it has been frequently criticized for its methodology and conclusions, it was responsible for a wide-ranging reinterpretation of early American history.

An icon of the progressive school of historical interpretation, his reputation suffered during the Cold War when analyses of economic class conflict were dropped by most United States historians. The consensus historian Richard Hofstadter concluded in 1968, "Today Beard's reputation stands like an imposing ruin in the landscape of American historiography. What was once the grandest house in the province is now a ravaged survival." The end of Cold War anticommunism has rekindled scholarly interest in Beard's historical methods and findings, particularly his later work on the domestic economic origins of U.S. foreign policy in the 20th century.

== Early life and education ==
=== Childhood ===
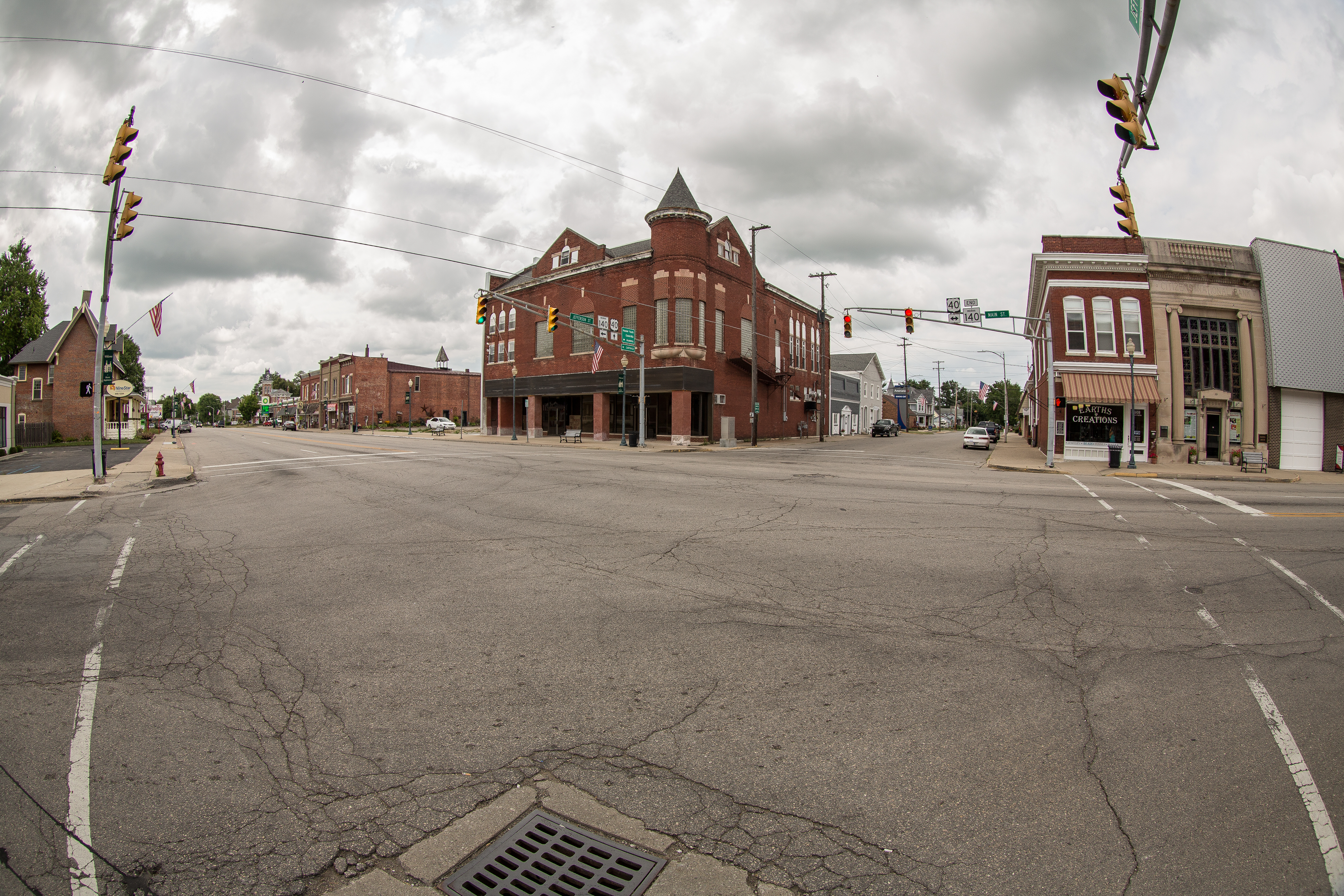
His hometown of Knightstown, Indiana

Charles Austin Beard was born on November 27, 1874, in Knightstown, Indiana, in the Corn Belt. His father, William Henry Harrison Beard, was a farmer, contractor, part-time banker, and real-estate speculator. In his youth, Charles worked on the family farm and attended a local Quaker school, Spiceland Academy. He was expelled from the school for unclear reasons but graduated from the public Knightstown High School in 1891. For the next few years, Charles and his brother, Clarence, managed a local newspaper. Their editorial position, like their father's, was conservative. They supported the Republican Party and favored prohibition, a cause for which Charles lectured in later years. Beard attended DePauw University, a nearby Methodist college, and graduated in 1898. He edited the college newspaper and was active in debate.

=== Education ===
Beard went to England in 1899 for graduate studies at Oxford University under Frederick York Powell. He collaborated with Walter Vrooman in founding Ruskin Hall, a school meant to be accessible to the working man. In exchange for reduced tuition, students worked in the school's various businesses. Beard taught for the first time at Ruskin Hall and lectured to workers in industrial towns to promote Ruskin Hall and encourage enrollment in correspondence courses. He returned to the United States in 1902, where Charles pursued graduate work in history at Columbia University. He received his doctorate in 1904 and immediately joined the faculty as a lecturer. Beard married his classmate Mary Ritter in 1900. As a historian, her research interests lay in feminism and the labor union movement (Woman as a Force in History, 1946). They collaborated on many textbooks.

== Career ==
=== Columbia University ===
After receiving his doctorate from Columbia University, he joined the faculty as a lecturer. There, he provided his students with a number of reading materials that were hard to acquire. He compiled a large collection of essays and excerpts in a single volume: An Introduction to the English Historians (1906), a compendium which was an innovation at the time. An extraordinarily active author of scholarly books, textbooks, and articles for political magazines, Beard saw his career flourish. He moved from the history department to the department of public law and then to a new chair in politics and government. He also regularly taught a course in American history at Barnard College. In addition to teaching, he coached the debate team and wrote about public affairs, especially municipal reform.

Among the many works that he published during his years at Columbia, the most controversial was An Economic Interpretation of the Constitution of the United States (1913), an interpretation of how the economic interests of the members of the Constitutional Convention affected their votes. He emphasized the polarity between agrarians and business interests. Academics and politicians denounced the book, but it was well respected by scholars until it was challenged in the 1950s.

=== World War I ===
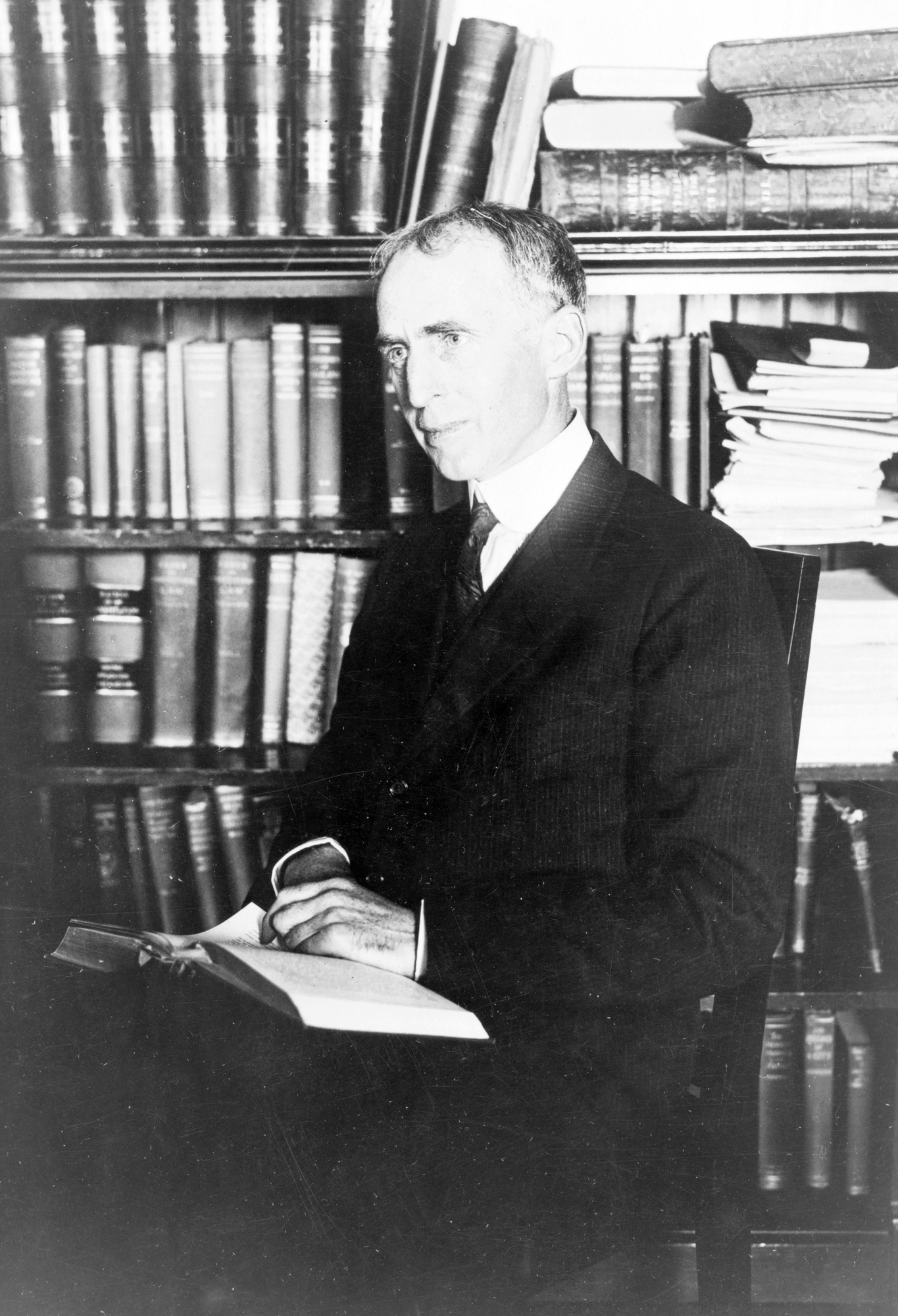
Beard in 1917

Beard strongly supported American participation in the First World War. He resigned from Columbia University on October 8, 1917, charging that "the University is really under the control of a small and active group of trustees who have no standing in the world of education, who are reactionary and visionless in politics, narrow and medieval in religion. I am convinced that while I remain in the pay of the Trustees of Columbia University I cannot do effectively my part in sustaining public opinion in support of the just war on the German Empire." After a series of faculty departures from Columbia in disputes about academic freedom, his friend James Harvey Robinson also resigned from Columbia in May 1919 to become one of the founders of the New School for Social Research and serve as its first director.

=== Independent scholar ===
Following his departure from Columbia University, Beard never again sought a permanent academic appointment. His financial independence was secured by lucrative royalties he had received from his textbooks and other bestsellers, including The Rise of American Civilization (1927), and its two sequels, America in Midpassage (1939), and The American Spirit (1943). The pair also operated a dairy farm in rural Connecticut that attracted many academic visitors. Beard was active in helping to found the New School for Social Research in the Greenwich Village district of Manhattan, where the faculty would control its own membership. Enlarging upon his interest in urban affairs, he toured Japan and produced a volume of recommendations for the reconstruction of Tokyo after the 1923 Great Kantō earthquake.

Beard had parallel careers as an historian and political scientist. He was active in the American Political Science Association and was elected as its president in 1926. He was also a member of the American Historical Association and served as its president in 1933. He was elected to the American Philosophical Society in 1936. In political science, he was best known for his textbooks, his studies of the Constitution, his creation of bureaus of municipal research, and his studies of public administration in cities. Beard also taught history at the Brookwood Labor College.

Beard was a leading liberal supporter of the New Deal and an intellectual leader in the Progressive movement. However, Beard was very critical of the majoritarian vision of democracy that most Progressive leaders endorsed. In fact, "Beard refrained from endorsing direct democracy measures as a blueprint for reform, focusing instead on streamlining the American system of government to incorporate in a transparent fashion, both political parties and interest groups."

=== World War II ===
Beard opposed President Franklin Roosevelt's foreign policy. Consistent with Beard's Quaker roots, he became one of the leading proponents of non-interventionism and sought to avoid American involvement in World War II. He promoted "American Continentalism" as an alternative and argued that the United States had no vital interests at stake in Europe and that a foreign war could lead to domestic dictatorship. He continued to press that position after the end of World War II. In his last two books, American Foreign Policy in the Making: 1932–1940 (1946) and President Roosevelt and the Coming of War (1948), Beard blamed Roosevelt for lying to the American people to trick them into war, which some historians and political scientists have disputed. He was criticized as an isolationist because of his views. The views that he espoused in the final decade of his life were disputed by many contemporary historians and political scientists.

However, some of the arguments in his President Roosevelt and the Coming of the War influenced the "Wisconsin school" and New Left historians in the 1960s, such as William Appleman Williams, Gabriel Kolko, and James Weinstein. On the right, Beard's foreign policy views have become popular with "paleoconservatives" such as Pat Buchanan. Certain elements of his views, especially his advocacy of a non-interventionist foreign policy, have enjoyed a minor revival among a few scholars of liberty since 2001. For example, Andrew Bacevich, a diplomatic historian at Boston University, has cited Beardian skepticism towards armed overseas intervention as a starting point for a critique of US foreign policy after the Cold War in his American Empire (2004). Beard died in New Haven, Connecticut, on September 1, 1948. He was interred in Ferncliff Cemetery, Hartsdale, Westchester County, New York, joined by his wife, Mary, a decade later.

== Legacy ==
=== Progressive historiography ===
By the 1950s, Beard's economic interpretation of history had fallen out of favor; only a few prominent historians held to his view of class conflict as a primary driver in American history, such as Howard K. Beale and C. Vann Woodward. Still, as a leader of the "progressive historians", or "progressive historiography", Beard introduced themes of economic self-interest and economic conflict regarding the adoption of the Constitution and the transformations caused by the Civil War. Thus, he emphasized the long-term conflict among industrialists in the Northeast, farmers in the Midwest, and planters in the South, whom he saw as the cause of the Civil War. His study of the financial interests of the drafters of the United States Constitution (An Economic Interpretation of the Constitution) seemed radical in 1913 since he proposed that it was a product of landholding Founding Fathers who were economically determinist. He saw ideology as a product of economic interests.

=== Constitution ===
The historian Carl L. Becker's History of Political Parties in the Province of New York, 1760–1776 (1909) formulated the progressive interpretation of the American Revolution. He said that there were two revolutions: one against Britain to obtain home rule and the other to determine who should rule at home. Beard expanded upon Becker's thesis, in terms of class conflict, in An Economic Interpretation of the Constitution of the United States (1913) and An Economic Interpretation of Jeffersonian Democracy (1915). To Beard, the Constitution was a counter-revolution set up by rich bondholders ("personalty" since bonds were "personal property"), against the farmers and planters ("realty" since land was "real property"). Beard argued the Constitution was designed to reverse the radical democratic tendencies unleashed by the Revolution among the common people, especially farmers and debtors. In 1800, according to Beard, the farmers and debtors, led by plantation slaveowners, overthrew the capitalists and established Jeffersonian democracy. Other historians supported the class conflict interpretation by noting the states confiscated great semifeudal landholdings of Loyalists and gave them out in small parcels to ordinary farmers. Conservatives, such as William Howard Taft, were shocked at the progressive interpretation because it seemed to belittle the Constitution. Many scholars, however, eventually adopted Beard's thesis and by 1930, it had become the standard interpretation of the era.

In about 1950, however, historians started to argue that the progressive interpretation was factually incorrect because the voters had not really been polarized along two economic lines. The historians were led by Charles A. Barker, Philip Crowl, Richard P. McCormick, William Pool, Robert Thomas, John Munroe, Robert E. Brown and B. Kathryn Brown, and especially Forrest McDonald. In Forrest McDonald's We The People: The Economic Origins of the Constitution (1958) argued that Beard had misinterpreted the economic interests involved in writing the Constitution. Instead of two conflicting interests, landed and mercantile, McDonald identified some three-dozen identifiable economic interests operating at cross purposes, which forced the delegates to bargain. Evaluating the historiographical debate, Peter Novick concluded: "By the early 1960s it was generally accepted within the historical profession that... Beard's Progressive version of the... framing of the Constitution had been decisively refuted. American historians came to see... the framers of the Constitution, rather than having self-interested motives, were led by concern for political unity, national economic development, and diplomatic security." Ellen Nore, Beard's biographer, concludes that his interpretation of the Constitution collapsed because of more recent and sophisticated analysis.

In a strong sense, that view simply involved a reaffirmation of the position that Beard had always criticized by saying that parties were prone to switch rhetorical ideals when their interest dictated. Beard's economic determinism was largely replaced by the intellectual history approach, which stressed the power of ideas, especially republicanism, in stimulating the Revolution. However, the legacy of examining the economic interests of American historical actors can still be found in the 21st century. Recently, in To Form a More Perfect Union: A New Economic Interpretation of the United States Constitution (2003), Robert A. McGuire, relying on a sophisticated statistical analysis, argues that Beard's basic thesis regarding the impact of economic interests in the making of the Constitution is not far from the mark.

=== Civil War and Reconstruction ===
Beard's interpretation of the Civil War was highly influential among historians and the general public from its publication in 1927 to well into the Civil Rights Era of the late 1950s. Beard downplayed slavery, abolitionism, and issues of morality. Beard ignored constitutional issues of states' rights and even ignored American nationalism as the force that finally led to victory in the war. Indeed, the ferocious combat itself was passed over as merely an ephemeral event. Charles Ramsdell says Beard emphasized that the Civil War was caused by economic issues and was not basically about the rights or wrongs of slavery.

Thomas J. Pressly says that Beard fought against the prevailing nationalist interpretation that depicted "a conflict between rival section-nations rooted in social, economic, cultural, and ideological differences." Pressly said that Beard instead portrayed a "struggle between two economic economies having its origins in divergent material interests." Much more important was the calculus of class conflict. Beard announced that the Civil War was really a "social cataclysm in which the capitalists, laborers, and farmers of the North and West drove from power in the national government the planting aristocracy of the South", arguing that the events were a second American Revolution. Beard was especially interested in the postwar era, as the industrialists of the Northeast and the farmers of the West cashed in on their great victory over the southern aristocracy. Hofstadter paraphrased Beard as arguing that in victory,

the Northern capitalists were able to impose their economic program, quickly passing a series of measures on tariffs, banking, homesteads, and immigration that guaranteed the success of their plans for economic development. Solicitude for the Freedman had little to do with northern policies. The Fourteenth Amendment, which gave the Negro his citizenship, Beard found significant primarily as a result of a conspiracy of a few legislative draftsman friendly to corporations to use the supposed elevation of the blacks as a cover for a fundamental law giving strong protection to business corporations against regulation by state government.

Dealing with the Reconstruction Era and the Gilded Age, disciples of Beard, such as Howard Beale and C. Vann Woodward, focused on greed and economic causation and emphasized the centrality of corruption. They argued that the rhetoric of equal rights was a smokescreen to hide the true motivation, which was to promote the interests of industrialists in the Northeast. The basic flaw was the assumption that there was a unified business policy. Beard's economic approach was rejected after the 1950s, as conservative scholars who researched specific subgroups discovered deep flaws in Beard's assumption that businessmen were united on policy. In fact, businessmen were widely divergent on monetary or tariff policy. Pennsylvania businessmen wanted high tariffs, but those in other states did not. The railroads were hurt by the tariffs on steel, which they purchased in large quantities.

== Works and writings ==
- 1901 – Beard, Charles Austin, The Industrial Revolution
- 1904 – Beard, Charles Austin, The Office of Justice of the Peace in England: In its Origin and Development
- 1914 – Beard, Charles A. Some Economic Origins of Jeffersonian Democracy, The American Historical Review
- 1913 – Beard, Charles, An Economic Interpretation of the Constitution of the United States
- 1915 – Beard, Charles, Economic Origins of Jeffersonian Democracy
- 1919 – Beard, Charles A. and Ogg, Frederic Austin. National Governments and the World War
- 1921 – Beard, Charles A. and Beard, Mary Ritter. History of the United States (2 vols.)
- 1922 - Beard, Charles A. The Economic Basis of Politics.
- 1923 – Beard, Charles A. The Administration and Politics of Tokyo
- 1927 – Beard, Charles A. and Beard, Mary Ritter, The Rise of American Civilization
- 1929 – Beard, Charles A. and Radin, George, The Balkan Pivot: Yugoslavia: A Study in Government and Administration
- 1932 – Beard, Charles, A Century of Progress
- 1932 – Beard, Charles, The Myth of Rugged American Individualism
- 1934 – Beard, Charles A. Written history as an act of faith. American Historical Review
- 1934 – Beard, Charles A. The Idea of National Interest: An Analytical Study of American Foreign Policy.
- 1935 - Beard, Charles A. The Open Door at Home: A Trial Philosophy of National Interest.
- 1935 – Beard, Charles A. That Noble Dream, The American Historical Review
- 1936 – Beard, Charles A. The Devil Theory of War: An Inquiry into the Nature of History and the Possibility of Keeping Out of War
- 1939 – Beard, Charles A. and Beard, Mary Ritter, America in Midpassage
- 1939 - Beard, Charles A. Giddy Minds and Foreign Quarrels: An Estimate of American Foreign Policy.
- 1940 – Beard, Charles A. A Foreign Policy for America.
- 1942 – Beard, Charles A. and Beard, Mary Ritter, The American Spirit, a Study of the Idea of Civilization in the United States
- 1943 - Beard, Charles A. The Republic: Conversations on Fundamentals.
- 1946 – Beard, Charles A. American Foreign Policy in the Making, 1932–1940; a Study in Responsibilities
- 1948 – Beard, Charles A. President Roosevelt and the Coming of the War, 1941; a Study in Appearances and Realities

== See also ==
- Political history in the United States, for historiography
