= Forrest McDonald =

American historian (1927–2016)

Forrest McDonald, Jr. (January 7, 1927 – January 19, 2016) was an American historian who wrote extensively on the early national period of the United States, republicanism, and the presidency, but he is possibly best known for his polemic on the American South. He was a professor at the University of Alabama, where, together with Grady McWhiney, he developed the hypothesis that the South had been colonized by "Anglo-Celts," rather than the British Protestant farmers who populated the North.

== Life ==
McDonald was born in Orange, Texas. He took his B.A. and Ph.D. degrees (1955) from the University of Texas at Austin, where he studied with Fulmer Mood. He taught at Brown University (1959–67), Wayne State University (1967–76), and the University of Alabama (1976–2002) before he retired. He was for a time the president of the Philadelphia Society. He died in Tuscaloosa, Alabama, on January 19, 2016, twelve days after his 89th birthday.

== Historical arguments ==
The historian Carl L. Becker in History of Political Parties in the Province of New York, 1760–1776 (1909) formulated the Progressive interpretation of the American Revolution. He said that there were two revolutions: one against Britain to obtain home rule and the other to determine who should rule at home. Charles A. Beard, in An Economic Interpretation of the Constitution of the United States (1913) and An Economic Interpretation of Jeffersonian Democracy (1915), extended Becker's thesis down to 1800 in terms of class conflict. To Beard, the Constitution was a counter-revolution set up by rich bond holders (bonds were "personal property") in opposition to the farmers and planters (land was "real property"). The Constitution, Beard argued, was designed to reverse the radical democratic tendencies unleashed by the Revolution among the common people, especially farmers and debtors (people who owed money to the rich). In 1800, according to Beard, the farmers and debtors, led by plantation slave owners, overthrew the capitalists and established Jeffersonian democracy. Other historians supported the class conflict interpretation by noting that the states confiscated great semifeudal landholdings of Loyalists and gave them out in small parcels to ordinary farmers. Conservatives, such as William Howard Taft, were shocked at the Progressive interpretation because it seem to belittle the Constitution. Scholars, however, adopted it, and by 1930, it became the standard interpretation of the era among academic historians but was largely ignored by lawyers and jurists. Beginning about 1950, revisionist historians led by Charles A. Barker, Philip Crowl, Richard P. McCormick, William Pool, Robert Thomas, John Munroe, Robert E. Brown and B. Kathryn Brown, and especially McDonald, showed that the Progressive interpretation was factually incorrect. Controversy raged, but by 1970 the Progressive Era interpretation was dead. It was largely replaced by the intellectual history approach that stressed the power of ideas, especially republicanism, in stimulating the Revolution.

In We The People: The Economic Origins of the Constitution, McDonald argued that Beard's An Economic Interpretation of the Constitution of the United States had misinterpreted the economic interests involved in writing the Constitution. Instead of two conflicting interests, landed and mercantile, there were three-dozen identifiable interests, which forced the delegates to bargain. The reviewer David M. Potter said: "He has tumbled a very large Humpty Dumpty [Beard's economic interpretation] from a very high wall of history, and American historical literature will never be entirely the same."

In 1978, Forrest McDonald joined Murray Rothbard in the maiden issue of Literature of Liberty, published by the Cato Institute. The first issue only featured essays by Rothbard and McDonald. In 1973, both men served as dual senior lecturers on the economic history of the United States for an Institute for Humane Studies seminar at Cornell University. McDonald echoed his partner's plaudits, adding that, "without exception, the major British political writers who carried the English libertarian tradition through the eighteenth century were gentrymen who were writing in fierce opposition to the new financial order." This new order had been created by mercantile bankers invested in monetary policy over broader fiscal concerns that included real estate, mostly under the Walpole ministry. In emphasizing the fiscal dimensions of real estate, McDonald averred, "Americans had evolved a set of advanced ideas and institutions regarding the rights of individuals to hold unfettered title to real property; indeed, they had developed the quite radical practice of treating land as an actual commodity, to be bought and sold at will...Thus the Americans absorbed the poison of antifinance capitalism with their mother's milk of liberty." McDonald pointed out, however, that "the Americans" periodically failed to collapse or conflate dual branches of a given dichotomy. For example, "the British writers and their American readers distinguished between liberty and licentiousness, the one resting upon virtue [in government], and the other upon depravity. But the distinction was scarcely one to satisfy any true libertarian." In 1990, McDonald appropriated his own review on Faces of the Revolution to extol Bailyn's thesis. Bailyn, opined McDonald, "made an unassailable case that the English opposition was central to the thinking of American Revolutionary leaders, anti-Federalists and Jeffersonians."

McDonald and his colleague Grady McWhiney (1928–2006) presented the "Celtic hypothesis" that stated that the distinctive culture of the South derives largely from the majority of the Southern population being descendants of Celtic herdsmen and the majority of the Northern population being the descendants of farmers. In 1987, the 200th anniversary of the Constitution, the National Endowment for the Humanities (NEH) selected McDonald for the Jefferson Lecture, the federal government's highest honor for achievement in the humanities. His lecture was entitled "The Intellectual World of the Founding Fathers." In a New York Times article after his selection, McDonald was quoted as saying that the federal government had "lost its capacity to protect people in life, liberty and property, to provide for the common defense, or to promote the general welfare." However, in interviews and in his Jefferson Lecture, McDonald opposed the idea of a new constitutional convention, partly because he felt that such a convention would become a "runaway" and a "catastrophe" partly because he thought the inefficiency of the American government was a saving virtue that limits its capacity for oppression; and partly because he felt that it would now be impossible to assemble a group as capable as the 55 delegates who attended the Constitutional Convention of 1787, which took place in an era that McDonald called "America's Golden Age, the likes of which we shall not see again."

McDonald's lecture was later described by conservative historian George H. Nash as "a luminous introduction to the intellectual world of the Founding Fathers." However, McDonald faced criticism for not acknowledging the imperfection of slavery in the original constitutional framework. The New York Times pointedly noted that on the same day as McDonald's Jefferson Lecture, US Supreme Court Justice Thurgood Marshall gave a speech that criticized "complacent belief" in the perfection of the Constitution because of the stain of slavery. The Times quoted McDonald's answer that at the time of the Constitutional Convention, "Slavery was a fact. It had simply not crossed many people's intellectual or moral horizons to question it," and he further commented, "The condition of the French peasants was far worse than that of the American slaves, and that was heaven compared to the Russian serf."

"The Intellectual World of the Founding Fathers" was republished in the essay collection, Requiem: Variations on Eighteenth-Century Themes.

He stated in 2011, "I am an unreconstructed Hamiltonian Federalist, and out of my admiration for Alexander Hamilton I have long been disposed to believe the worst about Thomas Jefferson."

Steven Siry stated:

Most important, his books have revised Charles Beard's economic interpretation of the Constitution, challenged the robber baron stereotype of American industrialists, offered a critical view of Thomas Jefferson's presidency, praised Alexander Hamilton's vision for America's economic development, and, as a co-author with Grady McWhiney, developed the Celtic thesis that offered a new perspective on the Civil War era.

Andrew Ferguson stated:

McDonald’s specialty was the Founding Fathers and he was unapologetically conservative. He once said the two facts were closely related, because a proper understanding of the Founders' concerns and intentions – particularly their obsession with constraining and dispersing political power – inevitably pointed one toward an appreciation of the conservative virtues.

== Evidence of political views ==
On May 14, 1994, Brian Lamb, co-founder of C-SPAN, interviewed Forrest McDonald for the network's Booknotes. McDonald commented that his "doctoral dissertation, which later got turned into a book called We the People, absolutely demolished the Beard interpretation, and I say that not boastfully---every reviewer agreed that it did." During the interview, McDonald's description of "Irving Kristol and people like that" as "neos" signified criticism of an early neoconservative political economy, aligned with The Public Interest as well as the ethno-racial contours of the Moynihan Report, prior to The Weekly Standard and "reconciliation with capitalism." This conflict was often referred to as the Neoconservative - Paleoconservative Conflict. The following is a transcription of the segment:

LAMB: How would you describe your political views?

McDONALD: Conservative.

LAMB: How conservative?

McDONALD: Paleo. The New York Times reviewed this book a little while back, and I was described as a distinguished neo-conservative. Well, from the New York Times' point of view, that's a good thing because they think real conservatives are crazy, and they think that neos are very bright, like Irving Kristol and people like that. So the reviewer did me a favor, but I was scared to death that one of my very conservative friends would write in -- I've got friends like this -- and say, "He's no neo-conservative; he's a paleo-conservative."

LAMB: What does that mean?

McDONALD: Old conservative. You know the conservatives are divided into different camps. There's as much infighting among them as is on the other end of the political spectrum [e.g., in 2007, Lew Rockwell disclosed that he no longer self-identified as paleolibertarian because of its previous conflation with paleoconservatism].

LAMB: How long have you been a conservative?

McDONALD: As long as I can remember.

== Books ==
- Let There Be Light: The Electric Utility Industry in Wisconsin (Madison: American History Research Center, 1957)
- We The People: The Economic Origins of the Constitution (Chicago: University of Chicago Press, 1958; new ed. New Brunswick: Transaction, 1992)
- Insull (Chicago: University of Chicago Press, 1962)
- E Pluribus Unum: The Formation of the American Republic (Boston: Houghton-Mifflin, 1965; new ed., Indianapolis: Liberty Press, 1979); full text free
- The Presidency of George Washington (University Press of Kansas, 1974, paperback ed., 1985) excerpt and text search; full text free
- The Phaeton Ride: The Crisis of American Success (Doubleday, 1974)
- The Presidency of Thomas Jefferson (University Press of Kansas, 1976; paperback ed., 1987) excerpt and text search
- Alexander Hamilton: A Biography (Norton, 1979) online edition; full text free
- The American People, university textbook with David Burner and Eugene D. Genovese; Revisionary Press, 1980 online edition
- A Constitutional History of the United States (1982), short textbook
- Novus Ordo Seclorum: The Intellectual Origins of the Constitution (University Press of Kansas, 1985) excerpt and text search (1986 Pulitzer Prize Finalist)
- Requiem: Variations on Eighteenth-Century Themes (University Press of Kansas, 1988), with Ellen Shapiro McDonald
- The American Presidency: An Intellectual History (University Press of Kansas, 1994; paperback ed., 1995) excerpt and text search; full text free
- States' Rights and the Union: Imperium in Imperio, 1776–1876 (University Press of Kansas, 2000) excerpt and text search; full text free
- Recovering the Past: A Historian's Memoir (2004), autobiography excerpt and text search
