= Grady McWhiney =

American historian (1928–2006)

- Born: July 15, 1928; Shreveport, Louisiana, U.S.
- Died: April 18, 2006 (aged 77)
- Education: Centenary College of Louisiana; Louisiana State University (MA); Columbia University (PhD)
- Occupation: Historian
- Spouse: Sue Baca (m. 1947; died 2000)

Grady McWhiney (July 15, 1928 – April 18, 2006) was a historian of the American South and the U.S. Civil War.

== Early life and education ==
McWhiney was born in Shreveport, Louisiana, and served in the Marine Corps in 1945. He married in 1947.

He attended Centenary College on the G.I. Bill and earned an M.A. in history from Louisiana State University, working with Francis Butler Simkins. He received his Ph.D. in history from Columbia University in New York, working with David Herbert Donald.

== Career ==
McWhiney's dissertation dealt with Confederate General Braxton Bragg. He later became a noted specialist on the American Civil War era, as well as southern social and economic history. He coauthored Attack and Die with his doctoral student Perry Jamieson. He published Braxton Bragg and Confederate Defeat, in two volumes, as well as many scholarly and popular articles and reviews. He lectured frequently to both academic and popular audiences.

McWhiney taught at Troy State University, Millsaps College, the University of California, Berkeley, Northwestern University, the University of British Columbia, Wayne State University, the University of Alabama, Texas Christian University, The University of Southern Mississippi, and McMurry University. Over a 44-year career, he trained 19 history Ph.Ds.

McWhiney was a founder and director of the League of the South, but he had broken with the group prior to his death.

=== Celtic Thesis ===
McWhiney and Forrest McDonald wrote at length about the "Celtic Thesis," which holds that most Southerners were of Celtic ancestry, as opposed to Anglo-Saxon ancestry in the North, and that all the Celtic groups (Scots-Irish, Irish, Scottish, Welsh and Cornish) were descended from warlike herdsmen, in contrast to the peaceful farmers who predominated in England. They traced numerous ways in which the Celtic culture shaped social, economic and military behavior.

Attack and Die stressed the ferocity of the Celtic warrior tradition. In "Continuity in Celtic Warfare." (1981), McWhiney argues that an analysis of Celtic warfare from 225 BC to 1865 demonstrates cultural continuity. The Celts repeatedly took high risks that resulted in lost battles and lost wars. Celts were not self-disciplined, patient, or tenacious. They fought boldly but recklessly in the Battles of Telamon (225 BC), Culloden (1746) and Gettysburg (1863). According to their thesis, the South lost the Civil War because Southerners fought like their Celtic ancestors, who were very fierce fighters and intensely loyal to their leaders but lacked efficiency, perseverance, and foresight.

McWhiney continued exploring the thesis in Cracker Culture: Celtic Folkways in the Old South (1988), in which he extensively explored fundamental similarities between behaviors in the Old South and those in pre-modern Ireland, Wales, Scotland, and other areas in Great Britain where Celtic peoples settled.

In 1993 McWhiney argued that fundamental differences between North and South developed during the 18th century, when Celtic migrants first settled in the Old South. Some of the fundamental attributes that caused the Old South to adopt anti-English values and practices were Celtic social organization, language, and means of livelihood. According to the thesis, it was the Celtic values and traditions that set the agrarian South apart from the industrialized civilization developing in the North.

McWhiney and McDonald's Celtic Thesis is controversial and not totally accepted by historians. It did receive some verification in the work of historian David Hackett Fischer in Albion's Seed: Four British Folkways in America published in 1989.

== Legacy ==
McWhiney founded the Grady McWhiney Research Foundation, located in Abilene, Texas.

As historian C. David Dalton has pointed out, McWhiney was "Controversial. Unconventional. Influential. These are words easily applied to one of the South's most prominent scholars, Grady McWhiney. For over three decades his writings have been discussed and debated but never disregarded."
