= An Economic Interpretation of the Constitution of the United States =

1913 book by Charles A. Beard

- 1925 edition (publ. Macmillan)
- Author: Charles A. Beard
- Language: English
- Subject: History
- Publisher: Macmillan
- Publication date: 1913
- Publication place: United States
- Media type: Paper

An Economic Interpretation of the Constitution of the United States is a 1913 book by American historian Charles A. Beard. It interpreted the early history of the United States from the lens of class conflict, arguing that the Constitution of the United States was structured to financially benefit the Founding Fathers.

== Summary ==
An Economic Interpretation of the Constitution of the United States argues that the structure of the Constitution of the United States was motivated primarily by the personal financial interests of the Founding Fathers. Beard contends that the authors of The Federalist Papers represented an interest group themselves. More specifically, Beard contends that the Constitutional Convention was attended by, and the Constitution was therefore written by, a "cohesive" elite seeking to protect its personal property (especially federal bonds) and economic standing. Beard examined the occupations and property holdings of the members of the convention from tax and census records, contemporaneous news accounts, and biographical sources, demonstrating the degree to which each stood to benefit from various Constitutional provisions. Beard pointed out, for example, that George Washington was the wealthiest landowner in the country, and had provided significant funding towards the American Revolution. Beard traces the Constitutional guarantee that the newly formed nation would pay its debts to the desire of Washington and similarly situated lenders to have their costs refunded.

== Historiography ==
Historian Carl L. Becker in History of Political Parties in the Province of New York, 1760–1776 (1909) formulated the Progressive interpretation of the American Revolution. He said there were two revolutions: one against Britain to obtain home rule, and the other to determine who should rule at home. Charles A. Beard in An Economic Interpretation of the Constitution of the United States (1913) and Economic Origins of Jeffersonian Democracy (1915) extended Becker's thesis down to 1800 in terms of class conflict. To Beard, the Constitution was a counter-revolution, set up by rich bond holders (bonds were "personal property"), in opposition to the farmers and planters (land was "real property"). The Constitution, Beard argued, was designed to reverse the radical democratic tendencies unleashed by the Revolution among the common people, especially farmers and debtors (people who owed money to the rich). In 1800, said Beard, the farmers and debtors, led by plantation slaveowners, overthrew the capitalists and established Jeffersonian democracy.

Other historians supported the class conflict interpretation, noting that the states confiscated great semifeudal landholdings of Loyalists and gave them out in small parcels to ordinary farmers. Conservatives such as William Howard Taft were shocked at the Progressive interpretation because it seemed to belittle the Constitution. History professors, however, mostly adopted it and by 1930 it became the standard interpretation of the era among them, but was largely ignored by the legal community.

Beginning at around 1950, historians argued that the Progressive interpretation was factually incorrect; they were led by Charles A. Barker, Philip Crowl, Richard P. McCormick, William Pool, Robert Thomas, John Munroe, Robert E. Brown and B. Kathryn Brown, and especially Forrest McDonald. McDonald in We The People: The Economic Origins of the Constitution (1958) argued that Beard had misinterpreted the economic interests involved in writing the Constitution. Instead of two interests—landed and mercantile—which conflicted, McDonald asserted that there were three dozen identifiable interests that forced the delegates to bargain. Evaluating the debate, historian Peter Novick concluded:

By the early 1960s it was generally accepted within the historical profession that [...] Beard’s Progressive version of the [...] framing of the Constitution had been decisively refuted. American historians came to see [...] the framers of the Constitution, rather than having self-interested motives, were led by concern for political unity, national economic development, and diplomatic security.

The Progressive interpretation of the era was largely replaced by the intellectual history approach that stressed the power of ideas, especially republicanism, in stimulating the Revolution.

Robert McGuire and his students re-evaluated both Beard and McDonald's interpretations and have produced modifications and criticisms of both. Deploying statistical analyses of voting patterns, McGuire has argued that the class interests of the founders and ratifiers did indeed matter, contrary to the McDonald interpretation. However, these were but one factor that led to the eventual outcome, and other factors, including ideological beliefs, the effects on constituents, and more nuanced and distributed financial and economic concerns also played a role.

== See also ==
- Edwin R. A. Seligman, author of The Economic Interpretation of History

== Bibliography ==
- Beard, Charles (1913). An Economic Interpretation of the Constitution of the United States ..
- Beard, Charles (1915). Economic Origins of Jeffersonian Democracy.
- Brogan, D. W. “The Quarrel over Charles Austin Beard and the American Constitution.” Economic History Review, vol. 18, no. 1, 1965, pp. 199–223. online
- Edling, Max M. (2003). A Revolution in Favor of Government: Origins of the U.S. Constitution and the Making of the American State. (a current interpretation)
- Goldman, Eric (1952). "The Origins of Beard's Economic Interpretation of the Constitution". Journal of the History of Ideas. 13 (2): 234–249. doi:10.2307/2707613. JSTOR 2707613.
- Thomas, Robert E. (1952). "A Reappraisal of Charles A. Beard's An Economic Interpretation of the Constitution of the United States". American Historical Review. 57 (2): 370–375. doi:10.2307/1849881. JSTOR 1849881.
