= Elizabeth Clark-Lewis =

American historian

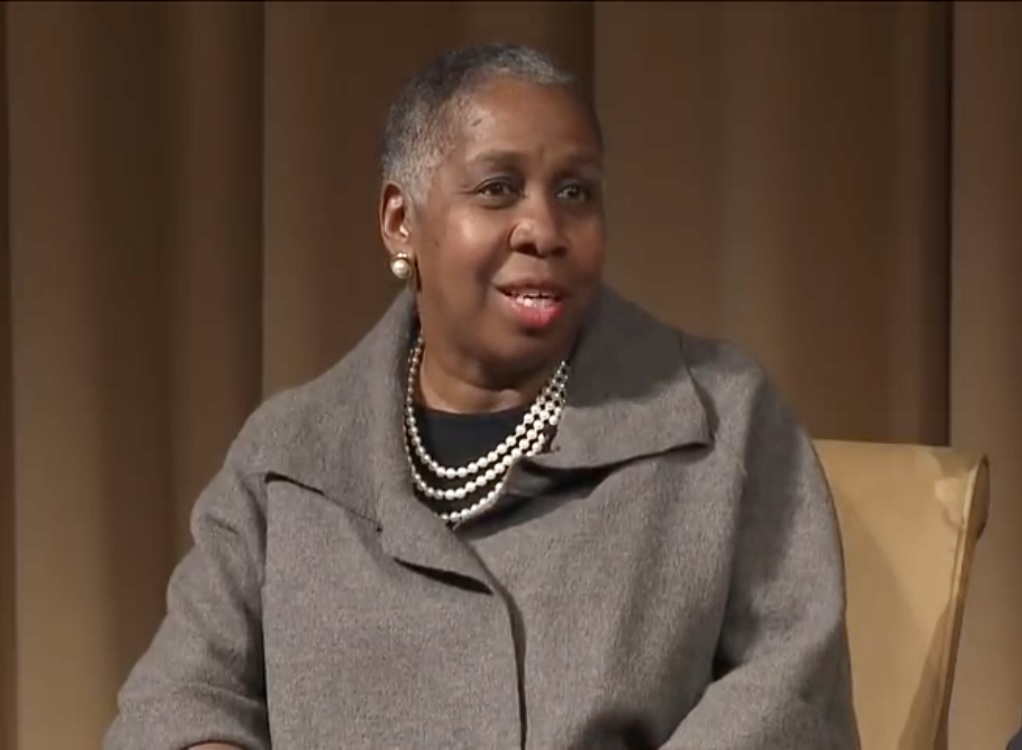
- Clark-Lewis speaks at the United States National Archives in 2019
- Education: Howard University; University of Maryland, College Park
- Occupations: Professor; Historian
- Employer: Howard University
- Notable work: Living In, Living Out: African American Domestics in Washington, DC
- Title: Professor of History; Director of the Public History Program

Elizabeth Clark-Lewis is an American historian. She is professor of history and director of the public history program at Howard University. She has written about slavery, emancipation and domestic labor among other topics, especially as regards the Washington, DC, area.

== Education ==
Clark-Lewis earned a BA and MA from Howard University, then a PhD in American Studies from University of Maryland, College Park. Her college thesis on her own family history—her mother and great-aunts had been domestic servants in Washington, and the previous generations had been enslaved—grew into a dissertation on Black women during the Great Migration.

== Career ==
In the 1970s, Clark-Lewis was an instructor, then professor (in the 1980s) at Northern Virginia Community College. In 1990, she joined Howard University as an assistant professor and director of its public history program. She was promoted to full professor in 2003. She has also been director of graduate studies. She has been on the board of the Organization of American Historians and was director of the Association of Black Women Historians.

Among her public history efforts, Clark-Lewis was one of the historians in the City Lights project bringing historical programming to older residents of DC's public housing, connecting their own lives to the city's history. This program also used the PBS documentary Freedom Bags (1990), which Clark-Lewis co-produced with Stanley Nelson Jr. Their film won the Oscar Micheaux Award from the Black Filmmakers Hall of Fame.

=== First Freed ===
In 1992, Clark-Lewis organized a conference and lecture series on the Emancipation era in Washington, DC. The local focus, following on the revival of DC's Emancipation Day celebration, drew a great deal of community interest, with scholars and local residents, adults and children alike all attending and exchanging ideas and local historical recollections. The subject was the period beginning nine months before the Emancipation Proclamation, when the federal government conducted a trial run in DC, emancipating enslaved African Americans and paying compensation to their former enslavers to see if the latter would then remain loyal to the Union. Clark-Lewis edited a collection of the resulting papers, which "brings important detail and analysis to the events before, during, and after Emancipation," writes Jane Freundel Levey in Washington History. "Most important, Clark-Lewis has shaped the papers into an invaluable resource on the Emancipation Era in Washington." in First Freed: Washington, DC, in the Emancipation Era. "The whole makes for compelling reading." Historian Denise Meringolo, in an H-Net review, writes, "Taken as a whole, the volume succeeds in at least two ways. First, by emphasizing the African-American community's active role in achieving emancipation and defining African-American citizenship, the contributing scholars broaden our notion of American political discourse and ask us to consider the complexity of American identities. Second, while the articles contribute to our larger understanding of African-American history, they also document the details of daily life in the nation's capital."

=== Living In, Living Out ===
For Living In, Living Out: African American Domestics in Washington, DC, 1910–1940 (1994), Clark-Lewis conducted oral histories with 123 working class African American women who has moved to DC during the Great Migration, by then in their eighties and nineties. Writing in the Oral History Review, Shirley Ann Wilson Moore sees the book's biggest contribution in illuminating the gender differences that shaped the Great Migration, for example that men were able to leave the South on their own while women depended on a web of support to make the move. Additionally, for women domestic service was the principle job available, and the only question was whether they were live-in servants with the lack of free time and privacy that entailed, or day workers, a relatively more desirable position and difficult to obtain, yet the women Clark-Lewis interviewed stressed that its benefit were limited. One told her, "Life for a colored woman didn't never get 'better.' The most it got was 'different'." Even so, Clark-Lewis argues that the autonomy earned by preparing for and successfully executing the transition from live-in to day worker "did raise their collective consciousness about personal and social change."

In 2011, The Washington Post named First Freed and Living In, Living Out to a list of 50 "essential" books on Washington, DC history.

== Personal life ==
Clark-Lewis has a daughter.

== Works ==
- Clark-Lewis, Elizabeth (1985). "This Work Had A' End": The Transition from Live-in to Day Work. Memphis, TN: Center for Research on Women, Memphis State University.
- Blois, Beverly; Bailey, Raymond; Clark-Lewis, Elizabeth; Errico, Charles; Reed, Patrick, eds. (1987). Northern Virginia Community College: An Oral History, 1965 - 1985. Northern Virginia Community College.
- Clark-Lewis, Elizabeth (1994). Living in, living out : African American domestics in Washington, D.C., 1910–1940. Smithsonian. ISBN 978-1-56098-362-0.
- Clark-Lewis, Elizabeth, ed. (1998). Washington, D.C., in the Emancipation Era. Washington, D.C.: A.P. Foundation Press. ISBN 9781892236005.
- Clark-Lewis, Elizabeth, ed. (2002). First Freed: Washington, D.C. in the Emancipation Era. Howard University Press. ISBN 978-0-88258-207-8.
- Jones, Ida Elizabeth; Clark-Lewis, Elizabeth, eds. (2008). Emerging Voices and Paradigms: Black Women's Scholarship. Association of Black Women Historians. ISBN 978-1-892236-06-7.
- Clark-Lewis, Elizabeth, ed. (2011). Synergy: Public History At Howard University. A P Foundation Press.
- Clark-Lewis, Elizabeth, ed. (2014). Keep it Locked: 106 Tributes To AJ From The Mecca. A P Foundation Press. ISBN 978-1892236180.
