= Ralph E. Turner =

American historian (1893–1964)

- Born: Ralph Edmund Turner; November 6, 1893; Anthon, Iowa
- Died: October 5, 1964 (aged 70); New Haven, Connecticut
- Occupations: Historian; author
- Known for: Planning UNESCO
- Notable work: America in Civilization (textbook)

Ralph Edmund Turner (November 6, 1893 – October 5, 1964) was an American historian, author and professor emeritus of Yale University. He was also one of the planners for UNESCO. Turner first became a professor at Yale from 1944 until his retirement in 1961. In 1925, he published several books including a textbook called America in Civilization.

== Early life and education ==
Ralph Edmund Turner was born on November 6, 1893, in Anthon, Iowa. He began to study at the University of Iowa and graduated sometime in 1917. In 1934, he was dismissed from the University of Pittsburgh due to an unprecedented academic freedom violation.

== Publications ==
- Turner, Ralph E. (1925). America in Civilization. New York: F.S. Crofts. OCLC 6398184.
- — (1933). James Silk Buckingham: A Social Biography. New York: Whittlesey House, McGraw-Hill Book Company. OCLC 6180299.
- — (1941). The Great Cultural Traditions. New York: McGraw-Hill Book Company. OCLC 525952. (two volumes)
