= Howard K. Beale =

American historian (1899–1959)

- Born: Howard Kennedy Beale; April 8, 1899; Chicago, Illinois, U.S.
- Died: December 27, 1959 (age 60)

Howard Kennedy Beale (April 8, 1899 – December 27, 1959) was an American historian. He had several temporary appointments before becoming a professor of history at the University of North Carolina in 1935. His most famous student was C. Vann Woodward, who adopted the Beard-Beale approach to Reconstruction. He went to the University of Wisconsin in 1948, where he directed many dissertations. He specialized in nineteenth and twentieth-century American history, particularly the Reconstruction era, and the foreign policy of the early 20th century. He was a noted civil libertarian and advocate for academic freedom.

== Biography ==
Beale was born in Chicago to Frank A. and Nellie Kennedy Beale. In 1921 he graduated Phi Beta Kappa with a PhB in English from the University of Chicago. Beale received an M.A. and PhD from Harvard University. Beale married Georgia Robison, a fellow academic, and had 3 sons: Howard Kennedy Beale Jr., Henry Barton Beale, and Thomas Wight Beale. A few days before Christmas in 1959, Beale executed a will that essentially disinherited his youngest son, Thomas, who was ten years old at the time. In re Estate of Beale, 113 N.W.2d 380, 15 Wis. 2d 546 (1962).

== Reconstruction ==
In his PhD dissertation, finished in 1924 under the direction of Edward Channing, Beale developed a complex new interpretation of Reconstruction. The dominant interpretation for the previous two decades was that of the Dunning School, which held that unscrupulous Northern adventurers, known as Carpetbaggers, manipulated the new black vote in the South to take control of state governments for their own advantage in terms of speculation, and corruption. The Freedmen (freed slaves) were merely pawns in the hands of the Carpetbaggers.

Beale argued that the Carpetbaggers themselves were pawns in the hands of northern industrialists, who were the real villains of Reconstruction. These industrialists had taken control of the nation during the Civil War, and set up high tariffs to protect their profits, as well as a lucrative national banking system and a railroad network fueled by government subsidies and secret payoffs. The return to power of the southern whites would seriously threaten all their gains, and so the ex-Confederates had to be kept out of power. The tool used by the industrialists was the combination of the Northern Republican Party and sufficient Southern support using Carpetbaggers and black voters. The rhetoric of civil rights for blacks, and the dream of equality, was rhetoric designed to fool idealistic voters. Beale called it "claptrap." In his chapter, "Claptrap and Issues", Beale argued, "Constitutional discussions of the rights of the negro, the status of Southern states, the legal position of ex-rebels, and the powers of Congress and the president determined nothing. They were pure sham."

President Andrew Johnson had tried, and failed, to stop the juggernaut of the industrialists. The Dunning school had praised Johnson for upholding the rights of the white men in the South and endorsing white supremacy. Beale did not believe himself to be a racist, and indeed was one of the most vigorous historians working for black civil rights in the 1930s and 1940s. In his view, Johnson was not a hero for his racism, but rather for his forlorn battle against the industrialists. Beale did not publish his dissertation until 1930, when The Critical Year appeared to widespread scholarly acclaim. However Charles A. Beard and Mary Beard had already published The Rise of American Civilization which, in much abbreviated form, had developed a similar theme. Instead of feeling upstaged by the Beards, Beale became friends with them and vigorously promoted their general interpretation of American history. The Beard-Beale interpretation of Reconstruction became known as "revisionism", and replaced the Dunning school for most historians, until the 1950s.

The Beard–Beale interpretation of the monolithic Northern industrialists was challenged in the 1950s in the works of several historians, including Robert P. Sharkey, Irwin Unger, and Stanley Coben, who argued that there was no unified economic policy on the part of the dominant Republican Party and no conspiracy to use Reconstruction to impose a unified economic policy on the nation. Furthermore, the rhetoric on behalf of the rights of the Freedman was not claptrap but deeply held and very serious political philosophy. Beale's thesis finds support and development, conversely, in C. Vann Woodward's The New South (1951), W.E.B. Du Bois, Black Reconstruction (1935), William Appleman Williams, The Contours of American History (1961) and others.

== Foreign policy and editing ==
Beale turned his attention to foreign-policy during the 1940s and published his major study of Theodore Roosevelt's foreign policy (the Shaw Lectures on Diplomatic History delivered at the Johns Hopkins University). Beale, like Beard, felt both world wars were mistakes for the United States, and strongly disagreed with the interventionism and imperialism of Theodore Roosevelt. However, in writing the 600 page monograph he changed his mind, deciding that Roosevelt had a remarkably deep comprehension of world affairs, and practiced very careful, very successful diplomacy. Beale did complain that Roosevelt was too ambiguous regarding race, and too friendly toward Britain and Japan.

Beale was an active scholarly editor. He edited the diaries of Edward Bates (Attorney General) and Gideon Welles (Secretary of the Navy), who were members of Abraham Lincoln's cabinet. He edited a notable memorial work of essays by leading historians in honor of Charles A. Beard. Beale was an influence on the young William Appleman Williams at the University of Wisconsin.

In 1950 Beale spoke out against the call by Conyers Read, President of the American Historical Association, for historians to be enlisted in the ideological struggle against totalitarianism.

== Bibliography ==
- The Critical Year: A Study of Andrew Johnson and Reconstruction (New York: Harcourt Brace, 1930; reprint 1958)
- "The Tariff and Reconstruction." American Historical Review (1930) 35#2 pp: 276–294. in JSTOR
- "The Diary of Edward Bates, 1859-1866", Editor, (Washington, D. C.: United States Government Printing Office, 1933) online
- "The needs of Negro education in the United States." Journal of Negro Education (1934): 8–19. in JSTOR
- "Are American Teachers Free?: An Analysis of Restraints Upon the Freedom of Teaching in American Schools" (New York: Charles Scribner's Sons, 1936); 856pp online
- "On Rewriting Reconstruction History." American Historical Review (1940) 45#4 pp: 807–827. in JSTOR
- A History of Freedom of Teaching in American Schools (New York: Scribner's Sons, 1941)
- Beale, Howard K. "The professional historian: his theory and his practice." Pacific Historical Review (1953): 227–255. in JSTOR
- Charles A. Beard: An Appraisal, Editor, (Lexington: University of Kentucky Press, 1954)
- Theodore Roosevelt and the Rise of America to World Power (Baltimore: Johns Hopkins University Press, 1956)
- "Diary of Gideon Welles, Secretary of the Navy Under Lincoln and Johnson", Editor, (New York: W. W. Norton and Company, 1960)
