= Carl L. Becker =

American historian (1873–1945)

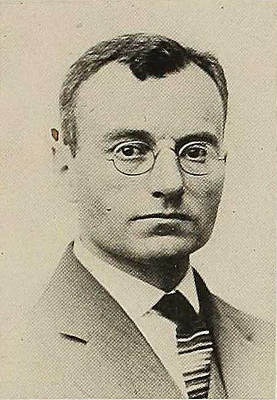
- Becker in 1919
- Born: Carl Lotus Becker; September 7, 1873; Waterloo, Iowa, U.S.
- Died: April 10, 1945 (aged 71); Ithaca, New York, U.S.
- Education: University of Wisconsin (PhD)
- Occupation: Historian

Carl Lotus Becker (September 7, 1873 – April 10, 1945) was an American historian who studied the American Revolution and the Age of Enlightenment in America and Europe.

== Early life and education ==
He was born in Waterloo, Iowa. He enrolled at the University of Wisconsin in 1893 as an undergraduate, and while there, he gradually gained an interest in studying history. Remaining for graduate work, Becker studied under Frederick Jackson Turner, who became his doctoral adviser there. Becker received a Doctor of Philosophy degree in 1907.

== Career ==
Becker taught at Pennsylvania State College, Dartmouth College, and the University of Minnesota. He was Professor of History at the University of Kansas from 1902 to 1916. He then became John Wendell Anderson Professor of History in the Department of History at Cornell University from 1917 to 1941.

He was elected a fellow of the American Academy of Arts and Sciences in 1923 and a member of the American Philosophical Society in 1936.

=== Writing ===
Becker's 1915 The Beginnings of the American People is often cited for a description of "colonial merchants" as "sunshine patriots". The "sunshine patriot" only appeared once in this book, and that in a quotation from Thomas Paine's first American Crisis essay, which concluded a series of parallelisms that, in turn, presaged the introduction of General George Washington to the narrative.

In this particular passage, Becker attempted to illustrate the "profound disillusionment" of the early years of the Revolutionary War, demonstrated by how "drudgery in obscure committee rooms was valued above declamation...the practical sense of Robert Morris counted for more than the finished oratory of Richard Henry Lee...when a febrile enthusiasm for liberty and the just rights of humanity seemed strangely transformed into the sordid spirit of the money-changer...[and finally] the times that tried men's souls, when 'the summer soldier and the sunshine patriot...shrinks from the service of his country, but he that stands...deserves the love of man and woman.'" The "sordid money-changer" was as guilty of an ebbing of revolutionary sentiments as "the sunshine patriot", but Becker did not explicitly define the latter as the former.

==== The Heavenly City of the Eighteenth-Century Philosophers (1932) ====
Becker is known for The Heavenly City of the Eighteenth-Century Philosophers (1932), four lectures on The Enlightenment delivered at Yale University. According to Peter Gay in 1957:

Its urbane and acidulous dissection of the philosophes has had great and lasting influence; few recent books on European intellectual history have been as widely read and as generously received. It is that rare work of scholarship that is also a work of literature--a masterpiece of persuasion that has done more to shape the current image of the enlightenment than any other book. Despite the skepticism of some professional historians, its witty formulations have been accepted by a generation of students and borrowed in textbook after textbook.

Becker's assertion that philosophies, in the "Age of Reason", relied far more upon Christian assumptions than they cared to admit, has been influential, but has also been much attacked, notably by Peter Gay. Interest in the book is partly explained by this passage (p. 47):

In the thirteenth century the key words would no doubt be God, sin, grace, salvation, heaven and the like; in the nineteenth century, matter, fact, matter-of-fact, evolution, progress; in the twentieth century, relativity, process, adjustment, function, complex. In the eighteenth century the words without which no enlightened person could reach a restful conclusion were nature, natural law, first cause, reason, sentiment, humanity, perfectibility....

This isolation of vocabularies of the epoch chimes with much later work, even if the rest of the book is essayistic in approach. Certain scholars consequently classify Becker as a "relativist". This "relativism" was more akin to "pragmatism" ("pragmatic relativism") as well as Saussurean linguistics and diachrony. Johnson Kent Wright writes:

Becker wrote as a principled liberal.... Yet in some respects The Heavenly City presents an almost uncanny anticipation of the "postmodern" reading of the eighteenth century.

— "The Pre-Postmodernism of Carl Becker", p. 162, in Postmodernism and the Enlightenment (2001), Daniel Gordon editor

According to American historian and cultural critic Morris Berman, The Heavenly City of the Eighteenth-Century Philosophers "has never been surpassed as an analysis of modernity".

=== Political views ===
Interviewed for the pamphlet Writers Take Sides: Letters about the War in Spain from 418 American Authors, Becker supported the Spanish Republicans. He also stated his opposition to dictatorship in general.

In 1910, Becker assessed Progressive Era Kansas Americanization, which included state temperance amendments and legislation, as an "individualism of conformity, not of revolt". Becker added that this "individualism [also] means the ability of the individual to succeed", infusing early 20th-century "Kansans" with "hair-triggered" vigilance that found "expression in the romantic devotion of people to the state, in a certain alert sensitiveness to criticism from outside". In addition, Becker attempted to sustain, rather than relativize, John Dewey's "effective freedom" and "negative freedom" in polities that attempted to advance both, usually under the rubric of a Progressive Era variant of proto-Crocean social liberalism. The dreaded "proto-" derives from Becker's arguments for social liberalism prior to the 1922 publication of his first (in a series) of reviews on Crocean philosophy.

Dewey promoted social democracy in Europe prior to the 1920s, but Becker's perspectives on the Progressive Era endorsement as well as variegated notions of market socialism during this period remain subjects of scholarly inquiry. For his part, Dewey's "negative freedom" did not exclude ideas on degrees of free markets (which myriad socialists chastised and chastise him for). These contentions presaged fascist exploitation of Crocean philosophy and the eponymous philosopher's condemnation of the same. Becker did address the multivalent consequences of "free trade" ideas in history, but decidedly argued that these ideas ran counter to the aspirations of representative democracy.

In his 1919 free trade in ideas dissent for Abrams v. United States, at the height of the First Red Scare, Oliver Wendell Holmes Jr., held that a dichotomous understanding of Progressive Era "negative freedom", between civil liberties in society on the one hand, and degrees of "free trade" in private as well as public economic sectors on the other, could still potentially result in the latter branch shaping, and even subsuming, the former branch. After the Holmes dissent, Becker began to study conflicts over natural-rights philosophy in U.S. history. James Ceaser argues that Becker ultimately found "natural rights" to be "meaningless" in the "modern world".

In his 1922 The Declaration of Independence: A Study in the History of Political Ideas, for example, Becker concluded that debates over establishing "authority" in "essential natural rights", while crucial for the "emotional inspiration" and "justification" of the "Founding", nevertheless had been rendered "meaningless" by attempts to enumerate seemingly countless natural rights ("What were they? Was there any sure way of finding out?") and by the "harsh realities of the modern world"—the "trend of action", "trenchant scientific criticism", and "temporary hypotheses" inherent in nationalism, industrialism, and an "aggressive imperialism". Given that Becker did not examine federalism, he did not fully explicate the legal history of the Ninth Amendment in addressing the former dilemma.

Becker continued criticizing natural-rights philosophy revivals in his 1932 The Heavenly City of the Eighteenth-Century Philosophers but both implicitly and explicitly indicated that such ideas could not be effaced from polities past, present, and future. Becker subsequently turned to examining enumerated natural rights as civil liberties within the changes and continuities that underpinned the Atlantic history of his previous Progressive Era social liberalism and, at the end of the interwar period, his endorsement of a United States variant of early-20th-century social democracy.

Alexander Jacobs contends that in Becker's later writings, such as the 1936–41 essays collected in New Liberties for Old and the 1944–45 Freedom and Responsibility in the American Way of Life, Becker found "democracy" to be the preferred mode of government if "traditional democratic ideology" sought to "secure these values with a 'minimum of coercion'". But Becker attempted to balance his history of civil liberties with an analysis of welfare states, the latter endeavor undermining his "post-progressive" disenchantment: "what the common man needs is the opportunity to acquire by his own effort, in an occupation for which he is fitted, the economic security which is essential to decent and independent living". Becker further identified four models of (federal) statist "collectivism" and rejected "Socialism, Communism, [and] Fascism", yet endorsing "what for lack of a better term we may call Social Democracy". He described the "Social" in his U.S. variant of early-20th-century social democracy as "whatever restrictions of economic enterprise may be necessary for the economic welfare of the people as a whole". His role (if any) in the founding of the Liberal Party of New York, a haven for social democrats in its early "left of left" years, remains a subject of scholarly inquiry.

Becker's Progressive Era social liberalism and his endorsement of "post-progressive" social democracy, advancing both civil liberties and the welfare state in the absence of Communism as well as myriad degrees of free markets, faced challenges similar to that of Crocean philosophy. His guarded criticism of US engagement in the Second World War, however, stemmed more from regrets over the First Red Scare and his qualified support for the Preparedness Movement than from concerns about the exploitation of rational-critical dichotomies in notions of "negative freedom" as well as, in turn, the Progressive Era conceptual bifurcation of "negative freedom" and "effective freedom".

In 1944, lectures delivered at the University of Michigan, published posthumously at the end of the following year, Becker proposed what has been described as a positive notion of public responsibility and provided a summation of his years of studying the history of civil liberties in the United States, including the Second Amendment. "Take first the civil liberties", Becker averred, for "all of these (with the possible exception of the right to bear arms, which seems now advantageous chiefly to gangsters) are, in respect to the end contemplated, invaluable and should be preserved". That exception, though, would undoubtedly prove significant because "one may well ask whether they [additional civil liberties] are defined in the bill of rights with sufficient care to attain the end desired in the complex social conditions of the modern world".

In a dénouement to another aspect of his historiography, the ailing Becker distinguished his previous "pragmatic relativism" from a possible factual and epistemic "relativist philosophy with which he had previously been identified"---the same "relativist philosophy" that a growing chorus of twenty-first-century scholars speculate his historical interpretations ultimately fell prey to. Becker believed that particular "relativist trend" in scholarship would facilitate "anti-intellectualism" and sowed the seeds of fascism. In one of his last major pieces of writing, he observed that "the anti-intellectual relativist trend of thought reaches a final, fantastic form: truth and morality turn out to be relative to the purposes of any egocentric somnambulist who can succeed, by a ruthless projection of his personality, in creating the power to impose his unrestrained will upon the world". Over sixty years later, in a final twist of irony, one of his posthumous critics offered a countervailing argument for "totalitarian" figures pursuing "perfectionist ideas" within, rather than "relativizing", a conceptual category of "positive liberty".

== Death and legacy ==
Becker died in Ithaca, New York. Cornell has recognized his work as an educator by naming one of its five new residential colleges the Carl Becker House.

== Works ==
- The History of Political Parties in the Province of New York, 1760–1776 (1908)
- Kansas (1910)
- The Beginnings of the American People (1915)
- The Eve of the Revolution (1918)
- America's War Aims and Peace Program, editor (1918)
- The United States: An Experiment in Democracy (1920)
- The Declaration of Independence—A Study in the History of Political Ideas (1922, 1942)
- Our Great Experiment in Democracy (1924)
- The Spirit of '76 (with G. M. Clark and W. E. Dodd) (1926)
- Modern History (1931)
- Everyman His Own Historian Archived 2013-09-28 at the Wayback Machine (1931)
- The Heavenly City of the Eighteenth-Century Philosophers (1932)
- Progress and Power (1936)
- Story of Civilization (with Frederic Duncalf) (1938)
- Modern Democracy (1941)
- New Liberties for Old (1941)
- Cornell University: Founders and the Founding (1943)
- How New Will the Better World Be?—A Discussion of Post-War Reconstruction (1944)
- Freedom and Responsibility in the American Way of Life (1945)
- Freedom of Speech and Press
- "What Are Historical Facts"
- Benjamin Franklin (1946, after Becker's death)

== Quotes ==
- "The temperament, the objects and the methods of a Mussolini, a Hitler, a Stalin represent everything that I most profoundly despise".
- "Freedom and responsibility." This saying, from a 1943 lecture, has been frequently misquoted. When Cornell memorialized Becker by naming a residential college in his honor, the university commissioned a large stone placard to be affixed to the building's entryway reading "FREEDOM WITH RESPONSIBILITY".

== See also ==
- List of American historians
- List of people from Iowa
- List of Cornell University faculty
- List of Dartmouth College faculty
- List of historians by area of study
- List of University of Kansas people
- List of University of Minnesota people
- List of University of Wisconsin–Madison people
