= Historiography of the Cold War =

As soon as the term "Cold War" was popularized to refer to postwar tensions between the United States and the Soviet Union, interpreting the course and origins of the conflict became a source of heated controversy among historians, political scientists and journalists. In particular, historians have sharply disagreed as to who was responsible for the breakdown of Soviet Union–United States relations after World War II and whether the conflict between the two superpowers was inevitable, or could have been avoided. Historians have also disagreed on what exactly the Cold War was, what the sources of the conflict were and how to disentangle patterns of action and reaction between the two sides. While the explanations of the origins of the conflict in academic discussions are complex and diverse, several general schools of thought on the subject can be identified. Historians commonly speak of three differing approaches to the study of the Cold War: "orthodox" accounts, "revisionism" and "post-revisionism". However, much of the historiography on the Cold War weaves together two or even all three of these broad categories and more recent scholars have tended to address issues that transcend the concerns of all three schools.

== Pro-Soviet accounts ==
Soviet historiography on the Cold War era was overwhelmingly dictated by the Soviet state, and blamed the West for the Cold War. In Britain, the historian E. H. Carr wrote a 14-volume history of the Soviet Union, which was focused on the 1920s and published 1950–1978. His friend R. W. Davies said Carr belonged to the anti-Cold War school of history, which regarded the Soviet Union as the major progressive force in the world, the United States as the world's principal obstacle to the advancement of humanity and the Cold War as a case of American aggression against the Soviet Union. Carr criticized those Anglophone historians, who he felt had unfairly judged the Soviet Union by the cultural norms of Britain and the United States.

== Orthodox accounts ==
The first school of interpretation to emerge in the United States was "orthodox". For more than a decade after the end of the World War II, few American historians challenged the official American interpretation of the beginnings of the Cold War. The "orthodox" school places the responsibility for the Cold War on the Soviet Union and its expansion into Eastern Europe. For example, Thomas A. Bailey argued in his 1950 America Faces Russia that the breakdown of postwar peace was the result of Soviet expansionism in the immediate years following World War II. Bailey argued Joseph Stalin violated promises he had made at the Yalta Conference, imposed Soviet-dominated regimes on unwilling Eastern European populations and conspired to spread communism throughout the world. From that view, American officials were forced to respond to Soviet aggression with the Truman Doctrine, plans to contain communist subversion around the world and the Marshall Plan.

Another prominent "orthodox" historian was Herbert Feis, who in his works like Churchill, Roosevelt, Stalin and From Trust to Terror: The Onset of the Cold War stated similar views. According to him, Soviet aggression in Eastern Europe in the postwar period was responsible for starting of the Cold War. Apart from this, he also argued that Franklin D. Roosevelt's policies towards Stalin and his "surrender" to Stalin's demands in the Yalta Conference paved the way for Soviet aggression and destabilized balance of power in Europe in Soviet favor. The interpretation has been described as the "official" United States version of Cold War history. Although it lost its dominance as a mode of historical thought in academic discussions in 1960s, it continues to be influential.

== Revisionism ==
The role of the United States in the Vietnam War disillusioned New Left historians and created many historians with sympathy towards the Viet Cong communist position and antipathy towards American policies. Much more important were the revisionists who argued that both United States and the Soviet Union were responsible for blundering into the war and rejected the premises of "containment". They battled the "orthodox" historians. "Revisionist" accounts emerged in the wake of the Vietnam War in the context of a larger rethinking of the United States role in international affairs, which was seen more in terms of American empire or hegemony. In the specific context of the Vietnam War, this "revisionist" narrative became the historiographical orthodoxy, whereas revisionism in Vietnam War historiography came to defend the US policy of containment.

While the new school of thought spanned many differences among individual scholars, the works comprising it were generally responses in one way or another to William Appleman Williams 1959 volume, The Tragedy of American Diplomacy. Williams challenged the long-held assumptions of "orthodox" accounts, arguing that Americans had always been an empire-building people even while American leaders denied it. The influence of Williams, who taught at the University of Wisconsin–Madison, and several of his students who subsequently published works on these themes, was enough to create what became known as the Wisconsin School of American diplomatic history. The Wisconsin School was distinct from the New Left; while members of each found themselves allied at times, New Left critiques tended to be a good deal more radical both in analysis and in proposed solutions.

Following Williams, revisionists placed more responsibility for the breakdown of postwar peace on the United States, citing a range of their efforts to isolate and confront the Soviet Union well before the end of World War II. They argued that American policymakers shared an overarching concern with maintaining the market system and capitalist democracy. To achieve that objective, they pursued an "open door" policy abroad, aimed at increasing access to foreign markets for American business and agriculture.

Revisionist scholars challenged the widely accepted scholarly research that Soviet leaders were committed to postwar expansion of communism. They cited evidence that the Soviet Union's occupation of Eastern Europe had a defensive rationale and that Soviet leaders saw themselves as attempting to avoid encirclement by the United States and its allies. In that view, the Soviet Union was so weak and devastated after the end of World War II to be unable to pose any serious threat to the United States, who maintained a nuclear monopoly until the Soviet Union tested its first atomic bomb in August 1949.

Revisionist historians have also presented the view that the origins of the Cold War date to the Allied intervention in the Russian Civil War. Some reach back even further as Wisconsin School historian Walter LaFeber in his study America, Russia, and the Cold War, first published in 1972, argued that the Cold War had its origins in 19th century conflicts between Russia and the United States over the opening of East Asia to American trade, markets and influence. LaFeber argued that the United States commitment at the close of World War II to ensuring a world in which every state was open to American influence and trade, underpinned many of the conflicts that triggered the beginning of the Cold War.

Starting with Gar Alperovitz in his influential Atomic Diplomacy: Hiroshima and Potsdam (1965), revisionists have focused on the United States decision to use atomic weapons against Hiroshima and Nagasaki during the last days of World War II. In their belief, the nuclear bombing of Nagasaki and Hiroshima in effect started the Cold War. According to Alperovitz, the bombs were used not against an already-defeated Japan to win the war, but to intimidate the Soviets by signaling that the United States would use nuclear weapons to stop Soviet expansion, though they failed to do so.

New Left historians Joyce and Gabriel Kolko's The Limits of Power: The World and U.S. Foreign Policy, 1945–1954 (1972) has also received considerable attention in the historiography on the Cold War. The Kolkos argued American policy was both reflexively anticommunist and counterrevolutionary. The United States was fighting not necessarily Soviet influence, but also any form of challenge to the American economic and political prerogatives through covert or military means. In this sense, the Cold War is less a story of rivalry between two blocs, but more a story of the ways by which the dominant states within each bloc controlled and disciplined their own populations and clients and about who supported and stood to benefit from increased arms production and political anxiety over a perceived external enemy.

== Post-revisionism ==
The revisionist interpretation produced a critical reaction of its own. In a variety of ways, "post-revisionist" scholarship before the fall of Communism challenged earlier works on the origins and course of the Cold War.

During the period, "post-revisionism" challenged the "revisionists" by accepting some of their findings, but rejecting most of their key claims. Another current attempt to strike a balance between the "orthodox" and "revisionist" camps, identifying areas of responsibility for the origins of the conflict on both sides. For example, Thomas G. Paterson in Soviet-American Confrontation (1973) viewed Soviet hostility and United States efforts to dominate the postwar world as equally responsible for the Cold War.

The seminal work of this approach was John Lewis Gaddis's The United States and the Origins of the Cold War, 1941–1947 (1972). The account was immediately hailed as the beginning of a new school of thought on the Cold War claiming to synthesize a variety of interpretations. Gaddis then maintained that "neither side can bear sole responsibility for the onset of the Cold War". However, he emphasized the constraints imposed on United States policymakers by the complications of domestic politics. In addition, Gaddis has criticized some revisionist scholars, particularly Williams, for failing to understand the role of Soviet policy in the origins of the Cold War. Gaddis's 1983 distillation of post-revisionist scholarship became a major channel for guiding subsequent Cold War research. An almost immediate move to challenge Gaddis' framework came from Melvyn P. Leffler, who "demonstrated that it was not so much the actions of the Kremlin as it was fears about socioeconomic dislocation, revolutionary nationalism, British weakness, and Eurasian vacuums of power that triggered US initiatives to mold an international system to comport with its concept of security". That provoked "strong rebuttals" from Gaddis and his followers, but Leffler deemed their objections inaccurate and unsubstantiated. However, Leffler himself still falls within the overall post-revisionist camp.

Out of the "post-revisionist" literature emerged a new area of inquiry that was more sensitive to nuance and interested less in the question of who started the conflict than in offering insight into United States and Soviet actions and perspectives. From that perspective, the Cold War was not so much the responsibility of either side, but rather the result of predictable tensions between two world powers that had been suspicious of one another for nearly a century. For example, Ernest May wrote in a 1984 essay:

After the Second World War, the United States and the Soviet Union were doomed to be antagonists. ... There probably was never any real possibility that the post-1945 relationship could be anything but hostility verging on conflict. ... Traditions, belief systems, propinquity, and convenience ... all combined to stimulate antagonism, and almost no factor operated in either country to hold it back.

From that view of "post-revisionism" emerged a line of inquiry that examines how Cold War actors perceived various events and the degree of misperception involved in the failure of the two sides to reach common understandings of their wartime alliance and their disputes.

After the opening of the Soviet archives, John Lewis Gaddis began to argue that the Soviets should be held more accountable for conflict. According to Gaddis, Stalin was in a much better position to compromise than his Western counterparts, given his much broader power within his own regime than Truman, who was often undermined by vociferous political opposition at home. Asking if it would have been possible to predict that the wartime alliance would fall apart within a matter of months, leaving in its place nearly a half century of cold war, Gaddis wrote in his 1997 book We Now Know: Rethinking Cold War History the following:

Geography, demography, and tradition contributed to this outcome but did not determine it. It took men, responding unpredictably to circumstances, to forge the chain of causation; and it took [Stalin] in particular, responding predictably to his own authoritarian, paranoid, and narcissistic predisposition, to lock it into place.

According to Leffler, the most distinctive feature of We Now Know is the extent to which Gaddis "abandons post-revisionism and returns to a more traditional interpretation of the Cold War". Gaddis is now widely seen as more "orthodox" than "post-revisionist". The revisionist Bruce Cumings had a high-profile debate with Gaddis in the 1990s, where Cumings criticized post-revisionism generally and Gaddis in particular as moralistic and lacking in historical rigor. Cumings urged post-revisionists to employ modern geopolitical approaches like world-systems theory in their work.

Other post-revisionist accounts focus on the importance of the settlement of the German Question in the scheme of geopolitical relations between the United States and the Soviet Union.

=== 21st century scholarship ===
Since the 2000s, benefiting largely from the opening of Cold War-era archives in the Soviet Union and elsewhere in the world, Cold War historians have begun to move on from questions of blame and inevitability to consider the Cold War in the longue durée of the 20th century, alongside questions of culture, technology and ideology. Historians have also begun to consider the Cold War from a variety of international perspectives (non-American and non-Soviet) and most especially have stressed the importance of what was then called the "Third World" in the latter half of the Cold War. As Odd Arne Westad, co-editor of the Cambridge History of the Cold War (2010) has written:

Very few of our contributors believe that a "definitive" history of the Cold War is possible (or indeed that it should be possible). But a heterogeneous approach creates a strong need for contextualization. ... First and foremost we need to situate the Cold War within the wider history of the twentieth century in a global perspective. We need to indicate how Cold War conflicts connect to broader trends in social, economic, and intellectual history as well as to the political and military developments of the longer term of which it forms a part.

Corresponding to the broader "emotional turn" in 21st century historiography, historians have increasingly begun to consider the unfolding of the Cold War in emotional and psychological terms. They have sought emotional explanations for political decisions and developments typically examined from a rational perspective and have analysed interpersonal dynamics between world leaders. Frank Costigliola is a prolific proponent of the role of emotion in historical analysis. For example, he positions the breakdown of the wartime alliance between the United States and the Soviet Union and the hostilities of the early Cold War as being, in part, a result of the heightened emotions of key figures in American foreign policy, like Averell Harriman, following the death of Franklin D. Roosevelt. To Costigliola, it was the "attitudes and rhetoric" of key diplomats at the end of World War II that set the tone for future relations between the United States and the Soviet Union.

Consistent with the move away from questions of blame to questions of culture and ideology, American historians have also begun exploring the intersection between domestic U.S. political developments and the early years of Cold War outbreak. One such example is Thomas Borstelmann's 2003 work "The Cold War and the Color Line", which defines domestic racial discrimination after 1945 as a foreign as well as a domestic issue: America’s closest allies against the Soviet Union were colonial powers who had interests that needed to be balanced against those of the emerging 'Third World' in a diverse multiracial, anti-Communist alliance. Domestically, at the same time, U.S. racial reform was essential to preserve the national consensus needed to sustain the Cold War struggle.

==== Revisionism in the 21st century ====
Despite the overall focus away from the Orthodox vs. Revisionist debates there have been new revisionist works that have emerged in the 21st century. One such example is Norman Naimark's 2019 Stalin and the Fate of Europe: The Postwar Struggle for Sovereignty.. Another work arguing that Stalin in fact sought to avoid the Cold War is the 2006 Stalin's Wars: From World War to Cold War, 1939-1953 by Geoffrey Roberts.

== Espionage ==
After 1990s new memoirs and archival materials have opened up the study of espionage and intelligence during the Cold War. Scholars are reviewing how its origins, its course, and its outcome were shaped by the intelligence activities of the United States, the Soviet Union, and other key countries. Special attention is paid to how complex images of one's adversaries were shaped by secret intelligence that is now publicly known.

== See also ==
- Historical revisionism
- Realism (international relations)

== Historiography ==
- Berger, Henry W. ed. A William Appleman Williams Reader (1992).
- Ferrell, Robert H. Harry S. Truman and the Cold War Revisionists. (2006). 142 pp. excerpt and text search.
- Fitzpatrick, Sheila. "Russia's Twentieth Century in History and Historiography," The Australian Journal of Politics and History, Vol. 46, 2000.
- Gardner, Lloyd C. (ed.) Redefining the Past: Essays in Diplomatic History in Honor of William Appleman Williams (1986).
- Garthoff, Raymond L. "Foreign Intelligence and the Historiography of the Cold War." Journal of Cold War Studies 2004 6(2): 21–56. ISSN 1520-3972 Fulltext: Project MUSE.
- Isaac, Joel; Bell, Duncan, eds. Uncertain Empire: American History and the Idea of the Cold War (2012) online review by Victoria Hallinan.
- Kaplan, Lawrence S. (1991). American Historians and the Atlantic Alliance. Archived from the original on 2012-10-20 – via Questia.
- Kort, Michael. The Columbia Guide to the Cold War (1998).
- Matlock, Jack E. "The End of the Cold War" Harvard International Review, Vol. 23 (2001).
- Melanson, Richard A. "Revisionism Subdued? Robert James Maddox and the Origins of the Cold War" Political Science Reviewer, Vol. 7 (1977).
- Melanson, Richard A. Writing History and making Policy: The Cold War, Vietnam, and Revisionism (1983).
- Olesen, Thorsten B., ed. (2004). The Cold War and the Nordic Countries: Historiography at a Crossroads. U Southern Denmark Press. p. 194. Archived from the original on 2009-01-05 – via Questia.
- Stephanson, Anders. American Imperatives: The Cold War and Other Matters, Verso Books, 2025
- Suri, Jeremi. "Explaining the End of the Cold War: A New Historical Consensus?" Journal of Cold War Studies - Volume 4, Number 4, Fall 2002, pp. 60–92 in Project MUSE.
- Trachtenberg, Marc. "The Marshall Plan as Tragedy." Journal of Cold War Studies 2005 7(1): 135–140. ISSN 1520-3972 Fulltext: in Project MUSE.
- Walker, J. Samuel. "Historians and Cold War Origins: The New Consensus", in Gerald K. Haines and J. Samuel Walker, eds., American Foreign Relations: A Historiographical Review (1981), 207–236.
- Watry, David M. Diplomacy at the Brink: Eisenhower, Churchill, and Eden in the Cold War. Baton Rouge: Louisiana State University Press, 2014. ISBN 9780807157183.
- Westad, Odd Arne, ed. Reviewing the Cold War: Approaches, Interpretations, Theory (2000) essays by scholars.
- Westad, Odd Arne, "The New International History of the Cold War: Three (Possible) Paradigms," Diplomatic History, 2000, Vol. 24 in EBSCO.
- Westad, Odd Arne, ed. Reviewing the Cold War: Approaches, Interpretations, Theory (2000) excerpt and text search.
- Westad, Odd Arne, The Cold War: A World History, Basic Books, 2017. ISBN 0465054935.
- White, Timothy J. "Cold War Historiography: New Evidence Behind Traditional Typographies" International Social Science Review, (2000).
- Xia, Yafeng. "The Study of Cold War International History in China: A Review of the Last Twenty Years," Journal of Cold War Studies10#1 Winter 2008, pp. 81–115 in Project MUSE.

== Bibliography ==
- Brinkley, Alan (1986). American History: A Survey. New York, NY: McGraw-Hill. ISBN 978-0-075-55075-4.
- Byrd, Peter (2003). "Cold War". In Iain McLean; Alistair McMillan (eds.). The Concise Oxford Dictionary of Politics (2nd ed.). Oxford: Oxford University Press. ISBN 978-0-192-80276-7.
- Calhoun, Craig (2002). "Cold War". Dictionary of the Social Sciences. New York, NY: Oxford University Press. pp. 74–76. ISBN 978-0-195-12371-5.
- Davies, R.W. (May–June 1984). "'Drop the Glass Industry': Collaborating with E.H. Carr". New Left Review. No. 145. pp. 56–70.
- Copeland, Dale C. (2024). A World Safe for Commerce. Princeton, NJ: Princeton University Press.
- Copeland, Dale C. (2014). Economic Interdependence and War. Princeton, NJ: Princeton University Press.
- Eisenberg, Carolyn Woods (1996). Drawing the Line: The American Decision to Divide Germany, 1944-1949. Cambridge University Press. ISBN 978-0521627177.
- Feis, Herbert (1957). Churchill, Roosevelt, Stalin: The War They Waged and the Peace They Sought. Princeton, NJ: Princeton University Press.
- Gaddis, John Lewis (1983). "The Emerging Post-Revisionist Synthesis on the Origins of the Cold War". Diplomatic History. 7 (3): 171–190. doi:10.1111/j.1467-7709.1983.tb00389.x.
- Gaddis, John Lewis (1997). We Now Know: Rethinking Cold War History. Oxford: Clarendon Press. ISBN 978-0-198-78070-0. Chapter One: "Dividing the World".
- Gaddis, John Lewis (2005) [1982]. Strategies of Containment: A Critical Appraisal of Postwar American National Security Policy (Revised ed.). New York, NY: Oxford University Press. ISBN 978-0-195-17448-9.
- Gaddis, John Lewis; Kuniholm, Bruce (1984). "[The American Conception of National Security and the Beginnings of the Cold War, 1945–48]: Comments". The American Historical Review. 89 (2): 382–390. doi:10.2307/1862557. JSTOR 1862557.
- Halliday, Fred (2001). "Cold War". In Joel Krieger, ed., The Oxford Companion to Politics of the World (2nd ed.). New York, NY: Oxford University Press. pp. 149–150. ISBN 978-0-195-11739-4.
- Hearden, Patrick J. (2002). Architects of Globalism: Building a New World Order During World War II. University of Arkansas Press. ISBN 978-1557287304.
- Hogan, Michael J. (1987a). "The Search for a Synthesis: Economic Diplomacy in the Cold War". Reviews in American History. 15 (3): 493–498. doi:10.2307/2702050. JSTOR 2702050.
- Hogan, Michael J. (1987b). The Marshall Plan: America, Britain, and the Reconstruction of Western Europe, 1947-1952. Cambridge University Press. ISBN 978-0521378406.
- Hogan, Michael J., ed. (2013). America in the World: The Historiography of US Foreign Relations Since 1941. Cambridge University Press.
- Hopkins, Michael F. (2007). "Continuing debate and new approaches in Cold War history". Historical Journal. 50 (4): 913–934. doi:10.1017/S0018246X07006437.
- Laqueur, Walter (1987). The Fate of the Revolution: Interpretations of Soviet History from 1917 to the Present (rev. ed.). New York, NY: Scribner. ISBN 978-0-684-18903-1.
- Layne, Christopher (2006). The Peace of Illusions: American Grand Strategy from 1940 to the Present. Cornell University Press. ISBN 978-0801474118.
- Leffler, Melvyn P. (1984a). "The American Conception of National Security and the Beginnings of the Cold War, 1945-48". American Historical Review. 89 (2): 346–381. doi:10.2307/1862556. JSTOR 1862556.
- Leffler, Melvyn P. (1984b). "[The American Conception of National Security and the Beginnings of the Cold War, 1945–48]: Reply". The American Historical Review. 89 (2): 391–400. doi:10.2307/1862558. JSTOR 1862558.
- Leffler, Melvyn P. (1999). "The Cold War: What Do 'We Now Know'?". American Historical Review. 104 (2): 501–524. doi:10.2307/2650378. JSTOR 2650378.
- Leffler, Melvyn P.; Painter, David S., eds. (2005) [1999]. Origins of the Cold War: An International History (2nd ed.). New York, NY: Routledge. ISBN 978-0-415-34109-7.
- Lewkowicz, Nicolas (2017). The Role Of Ideology In The Origins Of The Cold War. New York: IPOC. ISBN 978-8867722082.
- Louis, Wm. Roger (1977). Imperialism at Bay: The United States and the Decolonization of the British Empire, 1941-1945. Oxford University Press. ISBN 978-0198229728.
- Mastny, Vojtech (1996). The Cold War and Soviet Insecurity: The Stalin Years. New York: Oxford University Press. ISBN 978-0-195-10616-9.
- Naimark, Norman M. (2019). Stalin and the Fate of Europe: The Postwar Struggle for Sovereignty. Harvard University Press. ISBN 978-0674238770.
- Nashel, Jonathan (1999). "Cold War (1945–91): Changing Interpretations". In John Whiteclay Chambers II (ed.). The Oxford Companion to American Military History. New York: Oxford University Press. ISBN 978-0-195-07198-6.
- Offner, Arnold A. (2002). Another Such Victory: President Truman and the Cold War, 1945-1953. Stanford University: Stanford University Press. ISBN 9780804747745.
- Paterson, Thomas G. (1974). The Origins of the Cold War. D C Heath & Co. ISBN 978-0669244458.
- Pechatnov, Vladimir O. (2002). "The Russian Perspective: The Soviet Road to the Cold War". In Ralph B. Levering; Verena Botzenhart-Viehe (eds.). Debating the Origins of the Cold War: American and Russian Perspectives. Rowman & Littlefield Publishers. ISBN 0847694089.
- Pollard, Robert A. (1985). Economic Security and the Origins of the Cold War, 1945-1950. Columbia University Press. ISBN 978-0231058308.
- Radchenko, Sergey (2024). To Run the World: The Kremlin's Cold War Bid for Global Power. Cambridge University Press. ISBN 978-1108477352.
- Roberts, Geoffrey (2014). "Stalin's Vision of the Postwar Peace, 1939–1945". In Timothy Snyder; Ray Brandon (eds.). Stalin and Europe: Imitation and Domination, 1928–1953. Oxford University Press.
- Roberts, Geoffrey (2006). Stalin's Wars: From World War to Cold War, 1939-1953. Yale University Press. ISBN 978-0300112047.
- Schurmann, Franz (1974). The Logic of World Power: An Inquiry into the Origins, Currents, and Contradictions of World Politics. Pantheon. ISBN 978-0394484815.
- Viola, Lynne (2002). "The Cold War in American Soviet historiography and the end of the Soviet Union". The Russian Review. 61 (1): 25–34. doi:10.1111/1467-9434.00203.
- Wertheim, Stephen (2020). Tomorrow, the World: The Birth of U.S. Global Supremacy. Harvard University Press. ISBN 978-0674248663.
- Westad, Odd Arne (2010). "The Cold War and the international history of the twentieth century". In Melvyn P. Leffler; Odd Arne Westad (eds.). The Cambridge History of the Cold War, Volume 1: Origins. Cambridge: Cambridge University Press. pp. 1–19. ISBN 978-0-521-83719-4.
- Westad, Odd Arne (2000). "The new international history of the Cold War: three (possible) paradigms". Diplomatic History. 24 (4): 551–565. doi:10.1111/0145-2096.00236.
- Zubok, Vladislav M. (2025). The World of the Cold War, 1945–1991. Pelican.

=== Revisionist works ===
- Alperovitz, Gar (1965). Atomic diplomacy: Hiroshima and Potsdam. Vintage Books. ISBN 978-0745309477.
- Ambrose, Stephen E. (1971). Rise to globalism: American foreign policy since 1938. Penguin Books. ISBN 978-0142004944.
- Barnet, Richard J. (1972). Roots of War: The Men and Institutions behind U.S. foreign policy. Penguin Books. ISBN 978-0689104510.
- Bernstein, Barton (1970). Politics and policies of the Truman Administration. Quadrangle Books. ASIN B002GDN66E.
- Clemens, Diane Shaver (1970). Yalta. Oxford University Press. ISBN 978-0195013207.
- Donovan, John C. (1974). The Cold Warriors: A Policy-making Elite. Heath & Co. ISBN 978-0669839319.
- Fleming, Denna F. (1961). The Cold War and Its Origins (two vols). Doubleday Books. ISBN 978-0140121773.
- Freeland, Richard M. (1972). Truman Doctrine and the Origins of McCarthyism. Knopf. ISBN 978-0394465975.
- Gardner, Lloyd (1970). Architects of Illusion: Men and Ideas in American Foreign Policy, 1941–1949. Quadrangle Books. ASIN B0006BZDKK.
- Kolko, Gabriel (1972). The Limits of Power: The World and United States Foreign Policy, 1945–1954. New York, Harper & Row. ISBN 978-0060124472.
- Kuklick, Bruce (1972). American policy and the Division of Germany: the clash with Russia over Reparations. Cornell University Press. ISBN 978-0801407109.
- LaFeber, Walter (1967). America, Russia, and the Cold War, 1945-1966. Wiley. ISBN 978-0-471-51131-1.
- McCormick, Thomas J. (1989). America's Half-Century: United States Foreign Policy in the Cold War. Johns Hopkins University Press. ISBN 978-0801850110.
- Paterson, Thomas G. (1973). Soviet-American confrontation: Postwar reconstruction and the Origins of the Cold War. Johns Hopkins University Press. ISBN 978-0801814549.
- Steel, Ronald (1967). Pax Americana. Viking Press. ISBN 978-0670544769.
- Theoharis, Athan (1971). Seeds of Repression : Harry S. Truman and the origins of McCarthyism. Quadrangle Books. ISBN 978-0-8129-0169-6.
- William, William Appleman (1959). The Tragedy of American Diplomacy. Cleveland World Pub. Co. ISBN 978-0393334746.
- Wittner, Lawrence S (1974). Cold war America: from Hiroshima to Watergate. Praeger. ISBN 978-0275504908.
- Yergin, Daniel (1977). Shattered Peace: The Origins of the Cold War. Penguin Books. ISBN 978-0140121773.
