= Origins of the Cold War =

The Cold War emerged from the breakdown of relations between two of the primary victors of World War II: the United States and the Soviet Union, along with their respective allies in the Western Bloc and Eastern Bloc. This ideological and political rivalry, which solidified between 1945–1949, would shape the global order for the next four decades.

The roots of the Cold War can be traced back to diplomatic and military tensions preceding World War II. The 1917 Russian Revolution and the subsequent Treaty of Brest-Litovsk, where Soviet Russia ceded vast territories to Germany, deepened distrust among the Western Allies. Allied intervention in the Russian Civil War further complicated relations, and although the Soviet Union later allied with Western powers to defeat Nazi Germany, this cooperation was strained by mutual suspicions.

In the immediate aftermath of World War II, disagreements about the future of Europe, particularly Eastern Europe, became central. The Soviet Union's establishment of communist regimes in the countries it had liberated from Nazi control—enforced by the presence of the Red Army—alarmed the United States and United Kingdom. Western leaders saw this as a clear instance of Soviet expansionism, clashing with their vision of a democratic Europe. Economically, the divide was sharpened with the introduction of the Marshall Plan in 1947, a US initiative to provide financial aid to rebuild Europe and prevent the spread of communism by stabilizing capitalist economies. The Soviet Union rejected the Marshall Plan, seeing it as an effort by the US to impose its influence on Europe. In response, the Soviet Union established Comecon (Council for Mutual Economic Assistance) to foster economic cooperation among communist states.

The first major military confrontation of the Cold War came with the Berlin Blockade of 1948–49, when the Soviets attempted to cut off Western access to Berlin. The US and its allies responded with the Berlin Airlift, supplying West Berlin by air. This marked a turning point, shifting the Cold War from diplomatic tensions to the brink of direct military conflict, further entrenching the division of Europe. By 1949, the Cold War was firmly in place. The creation of NATO in 1949 formalized military alliances within the Western Bloc, signaling the start of a long period of geopolitical confrontation.

== Russian Revolution ==
In World War I, Britain, France and Russia, who had formed a Triple Entente, comprised the major Allied Powers from the start. The US joined them as a self-styled Associated Power in March 1917. The Bolsheviks seized power in Russia in November 1917 but the Imperial German Army advanced rapidly across the borderlands. The Allies responded with an economic blockade against all of Russia. In early March 1918, the Russian Soviet Federative Socialist Republic followed through on the wave of popular disgust against the war and accepted harsh German peace terms with the Treaty of Brest-Litovsk. In the eyes of the Allies, Russia now was helping Germany win the war by freeing up a million German soldiers for the Western Front and by "relinquishing much of Russia's food supply, industrial base, fuel supplies, and communications with Western Europe". According to historian Spencer C. Tucker, the Allies felt that "The treaty was the ultimate betrayal of the Allied cause and sowed the seeds for the Cold War. With Brest-Litovsk the spectre of German domination in Eastern Europe threatened to become reality, and the Allies now began to think seriously about military intervention", and proceeded to step up their economic warfare against the Bolsheviks. Some Bolsheviks saw Russia as only the first step, planning to incite revolutions against capitalism in every western country, but the need for peace with Germany led the first Soviet leader Vladimir Lenin away from this position.

In 1918, Britain sent in money and some troops to support the anti-Bolshevik "White" counter-revolutionaries. This policy was spearheaded by Minister of War Winston Churchill. France, Japan and the United States also sent forces to help decide the Russian Civil War in the Whites’ favor. Lenin made peace overtures to Wilson, and the American leader responded by sending diplomat William Bullitt to Moscow. The Allies ultimately rejected the ceasefire terms which Bullitt negotiated, believing that a White victory was imminent.

However, the Bolsheviks, operating a unified command from a central location, defeated all the opposition one by one and took full control of Russia, as well as breakaway provinces such as Ukraine, Georgia, Armenia, and Azerbaijan. Bainbridge Colby, the American Secretary of State, in 1920 announced an American policy of refusing to deal with the new regime.

Soviet Russia found itself isolated in international diplomacy. Lenin stated that the Soviet Union was surrounded by a "hostile capitalist encirclement" and he viewed diplomacy as a weapon to keep Soviet enemies divided. Lenin set up the Comintern, which called for revolutionary upheavals in capitalist countries. Nevertheless, Communist revolutions failed in Germany, Bavaria, and Hungary and by the mid-1920s Moscow was no longer fomenting revolution.

== Interwar diplomacy (1918–1939) ==
Differences in the political and economic systems of Western democracies and the Soviet Union—dictatorship by one party versus pluralistic competition among parties, mass arrests and execution of dissidents versus free press and independent courts, state ownership of all farms and businesses versus capitalism, became simplified and refined in ideologies to represent two ways of life.

In 1933, the United States, under President Franklin D. Roosevelt, officially recognized the Soviet Union. The long delay was caused by Moscow's repudiation of Tsarist-era debts, the undemocratic nature of the Soviet government, and its threats to overthrow capitalism across the world using local Communist Parties. By 1933, these issues had faded, and the opportunity for greater trade appealed to Washington.

== Start of World War II (1939–1941) ==
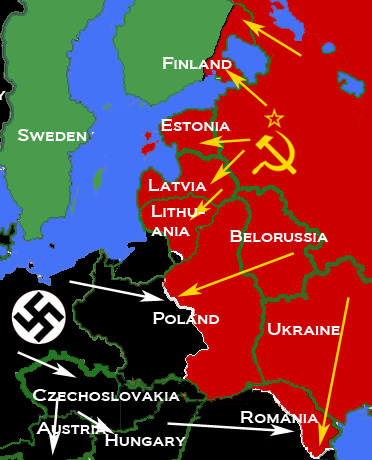
Soviet and German military and political advances in Central and eastern Europe 1939–1940

Moscow was angry with Western appeasement of Adolf Hitler after the signing of the Munich Agreement in 1938 which gave Nazi Germany partial control of Czechoslovakia after conference in which the Soviet Union was not invited.

In 1939, after conducting negotiations with both the British and French group and Germany regarding potential military and political agreements, the Soviet Union and Germany signed a Commercial Agreement providing for the trade of certain German military and civilian equipment in exchange for Soviet raw materials and the Molotov–Ribbentrop Pact, commonly named after the foreign secretaries of the two countries (Molotov–Ribbentrop), which included a secret agreement to split Poland and Eastern Europe between the two states.

== Wartime alliance (1941–1945) ==
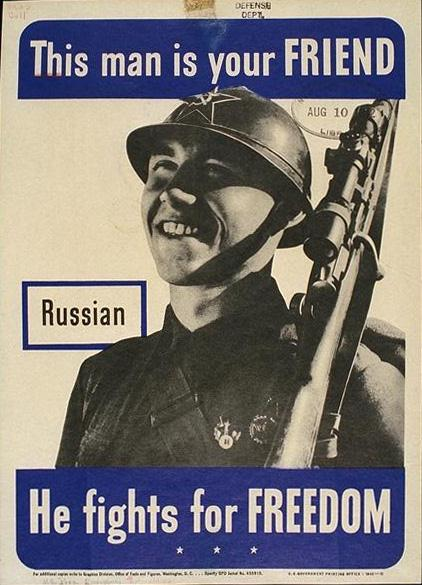
US government poster showing a smiling Russian soldier as portrayed by the Allies of World War II

On June 22, 1941, Germany broke the Molotov–Ribbentrop Pact with Operation Barbarossa, the invasion of the Soviet Union through the territories that the two countries had previously divided. Stalin switched his cooperation from Hitler to Winston Churchill. Britain and the Soviets signed a formal alliance, but the US did not join until after the Attack on Pearl Harbor on December 7, 1941. Immediately, there was disagreement between Britain's ally Poland and the Soviet Union. The British and Poles strongly suspected that when Stalin was cooperating with Hitler, he ordered the execution of about 22,000 Polish officer POWs, at what was later to become known as the Katyn massacre. Still, the Soviets and the Western Allies were forced to cooperate, despite their tensions. The US shipped vast quantities of Lend-Lease material to the Soviets. Britain agreed a broader military and political alliance in 1942.

During the war, both sides disagreed on military strategy, especially the question of the opening of a second front against Germany in Western Europe. As early as July 1941, Stalin asked Britain to invade northern France, but Britain was in no position to carry out such a request. Stalin had also requested that the Western Allies open a second front from the early months of the war—which finally occurred on D-Day, June 6, 1944. The US and Britain initially indicated that they would open the second front in 1942, and then in 1943, but it was postponed both times.

Throughout World War II, the Soviet NKVD's mole Kim Philby had access to high-importance British MI6 intelligence, and passed it to the Soviets. He was able to alert the NKVD about all British intelligence on the Soviets—including what the American OSS had shared with the British about the Soviets.

The Soviets believed at the time, and charged throughout the Cold War, that the Americans intentionally delayed the opening of a second front against Germany in order to intervene only at the last minute so as to influence the peace settlement and dominate Europe. Historians such as John Lewis Gaddis dispute this claim, citing other military and strategic calculations for the timing of the Normandy invasion. In the meantime, the Russians suffered heavy casualties, with as many as twenty million dead. Nevertheless, Soviet perceptions (or misconceptions) of the West and vice versa left a strong undercurrent of tension and hostility between the Allied powers.

In turn, in 1944, the Soviets appeared to the Allies to have deliberately delayed the relief of the Polish underground's Warsaw Uprising against the Nazi occupation. The Soviets did not supply the Uprising from the air, and for a significant time also refused to allow American air drops. On at least one occasion, a Soviet Air Force fighter shot down a British Royal Air Force plane supplying the Polish insurgents in Warsaw. George Orwell was moved to make a public warning about Soviet postwar intentions. A 'secret war' also took place between the British SOE-backed AK and Soviet NKVD-backed partisans. British-trained Polish Cichociemni agent Maciej Kalenkiewicz was killed by the Soviets at this time. The British and Soviets sponsored competing factions of resistance fighters in Yugoslavia and Greece, although both ceased after Churchill and Stalin made the Percentages Agreement.

Both sides, moreover, held very dissimilar ideas regarding the establishment and maintenance of post-war security. The Americans tended to understand security in situational terms, assuming that, if US-style governments and markets were established as widely as possible, countries could resolve their differences peacefully, through international organizations. The key to the US vision of security was a post-war world shaped according to the principles laid out in the 1941 Atlantic Charter—in other words, a liberal international system based on free trade and open markets. This vision would require a rebuilt capitalist Europe, with a healthy Germany at its center, to serve once more as a hub in global affairs.

This would also require US economic and political leadership of the postwar world. Europe needed the US's assistance if it was to rebuild its domestic production and finance its international trade. The US was the only world power not economically devastated by the fighting. By the end of the war, it was producing around fifty percent of the world's industrial goods.

Soviet leaders, however, tended to understand security in terms of space. This reasoning was conditioned by Russia's historical experiences, given the frequency with which the country had been invaded over the preceding 150 years. The Second World War experience was particularly dramatic for the Russians: the Soviet Union suffered unprecedented devastation as a result of the Nazi onslaught, and over 20 million Soviet citizens died during the war; tens of thousands of Soviet cities, towns, and villages were leveled; and 30,100 Soviet factories were destroyed. In order to prevent a similar assault in the future, Stalin was determined to use the Red Army to gain control of Poland, to dominate the Balkans and to destroy utterly Germany's capacity to engage in another war. The problem was that Stalin's strategy risked confrontation with the equally powerful United States, who viewed Stalin's actions as a flagrant violation of the Yalta agreement.

At the end of the war in Europe, in May 1945, the Soviets insisted on occupying the Danish island of Bornholm, due to its strategic position at the entrance to the Baltic. When the local German commander insisted on surrendering to the Western Allies, as did German forces in the rest of Denmark, the Soviets bombed the island, causing heavy casualties and damage among a civilian population which was only lightly touched throughout the war, and then invaded the island and occupied it until mid-1946—all of which can be considered as initial moves in the Cold War.

Even before the war came to an end, it seemed highly likely that cooperation between the Western powers and the USSR would give way to intense rivalry or conflict. This was due primarily to the starkly contrasting economic ideologies of the two superpowers, now quite easily the strongest in the world. Whereas the US was a liberal, two-party democracy with an advanced capitalist economy, based on free enterprise and profit-making, the USSR was a one-party Marxist–Leninist State with a state-controlled economy where private wealth was all but outlawed. Nevertheless, the origins of the Cold War should also be seen as a historical episode that demarcated the spheres of interests of the United States and the Soviet Union.

=== Wartime conferences ===
Clement Attlee, Harry Truman and Joseph Stalin at the Potsdam Conference, July 1945

Several postwar disagreements between western and Soviet leaders were related to their differing interpretations of wartime and immediate post-war conferences.

In late 1943, the Tehran Conference was the first Allied conference in which Stalin was present. At the conference the Soviets expressed frustration that the Western Allies had not yet opened a second front against Germany in Western Europe. In Tehran, the Allies also considered the political status of Iran. At the time, the British had occupied southern Iran, while the Soviets had occupied an area of northern Iran bordering the Soviet republic of Azerbaijan. Nevertheless, at the end of the war, tensions emerged over the timing of the pull out of both sides from the oil-rich region.

The differences between Roosevelt and Churchill led to several separate deals with the Soviets. Personal politics was reflected in the deals made with Soviets. Stalin's relationship with Roosevelt differed from that with Churchill, having greater respect between the Soviet and his American counterpart in the Grand Alliance. In October 1944, Churchill traveled to Moscow and proposed the "percentages agreement" to divide the Balkans into respective spheres of influence, including giving Stalin predominance over Romania and Bulgaria and Churchill carte blanche over Greece. Meanwhile, Roosevelt was less concerned with Balkan affairs. His aims were more concerned with working to secure a post-war alliance that included Stalin. At the Yalta Conference of February 1945, Roosevelt signed a separate deal with Stalin in regard of Asia and refused to support Churchill on the issues of Poland and Reparations. Roosevelt ultimately approved the percentage agreement, but there was still apparently no firm consensus on the framework for a post-war settlement in Europe.

Post-war Allied occupation zones in Germany

At the Second Quebec Conference, a high-level military conference held in Quebec City, 12–16 September 1944, Churchill and Roosevelt reached agreement on a number of matters, including a plan for Germany based on Henry Morgenthau Jr.'s original proposal. The memorandum drafted by Churchill provided for "eliminating the warmaking industries in the Ruhr and the Saar ... looking forward to converting Germany into a country primarily agricultural and pastoral in its character". However, it no longer included a plan to partition the country into several independent states. On 10 May 1945, President Truman signed the US occupation directive JCS 1067, which was in effect for over two years, and was enthusiastically supported by Stalin. It directed the US forces of occupation to "... take no steps looking toward the economic rehabilitation of Germany".

Some historians have argued that the Cold War began when the US negotiated a separate peace with Nazi SS General Karl Wolff in northern Italy. The Soviet Union was initially not allowed to participate and the dispute led to heated correspondence between Franklin Roosevelt and Stalin. General Wolff, a war criminal, appears to have been guaranteed immunity at the Nuremberg trials by Office of Strategic Services (OSS) commander (and later CIA director) Allen Dulles when they met in March 1945. Wolff and his forces were being considered to help implement Operation Unthinkable, a secret plan to invade the Soviet Union which Winston Churchill advocated during this period.

At the February 1945 Yalta Conference, the Allies attempted to define the framework for a postwar settlement in Europe. The Allies could not reach firm agreements on the crucial questions: the occupation of Germany, postwar reparations from Germany, and the fate of Poland. No final consensus was reached on Germany, other than to agree to a Soviet request for reparations totaling $10 billion "as a basis for negotiations". Debates over the composition of Poland's postwar government were also acrimonious. The Yalta Conference ended with "a declaration on liberated Europe pledging respect for democratic forms and providing a diplomatic mechanism for constituting a generally acceptable Polish government".

After Roosevelt's death on April 12, Harry S. Truman succeeded him as US president. Truman was unaware of Roosevelt's plans for post-war engagement with the Soviet Union, and more generally uninformed about foreign policy and military matters. The new president, therefore, was initially reliant on a set of advisers (including Ambassador to the Soviet Union Averell Harriman and Secretary of the Navy James Forrestal). This group tended to take a harder line towards Moscow than Roosevelt had done. Truman lacked the foreign policy confidence that pushed Roosevelt's initiatives with the Soviet Union. Eager to prove himself, Truman depended on his advisors, with Harriman using this lack of confidence to push his argument that Roosevelt's position on Stalin was based on fear, therefore Truman needed to prove the grit of the US. US-Soviet relations became decidedly colder. The death of Roosevelt, the end of the need for a wartime alliance against Germany, and the determination by American war planners that Soviet assistance in Manchuria would not be needed to defeat Japan, meant that the major barriers to disengaging with the Soviets had been eliminated.

Following the Allied victory in May, the Soviets effectively occupied Eastern Europe, while the US had much of Western Europe. In occupied Germany, the US and the Soviet Union established zones of occupation and a loose framework for four-power control with the ailing French and British.

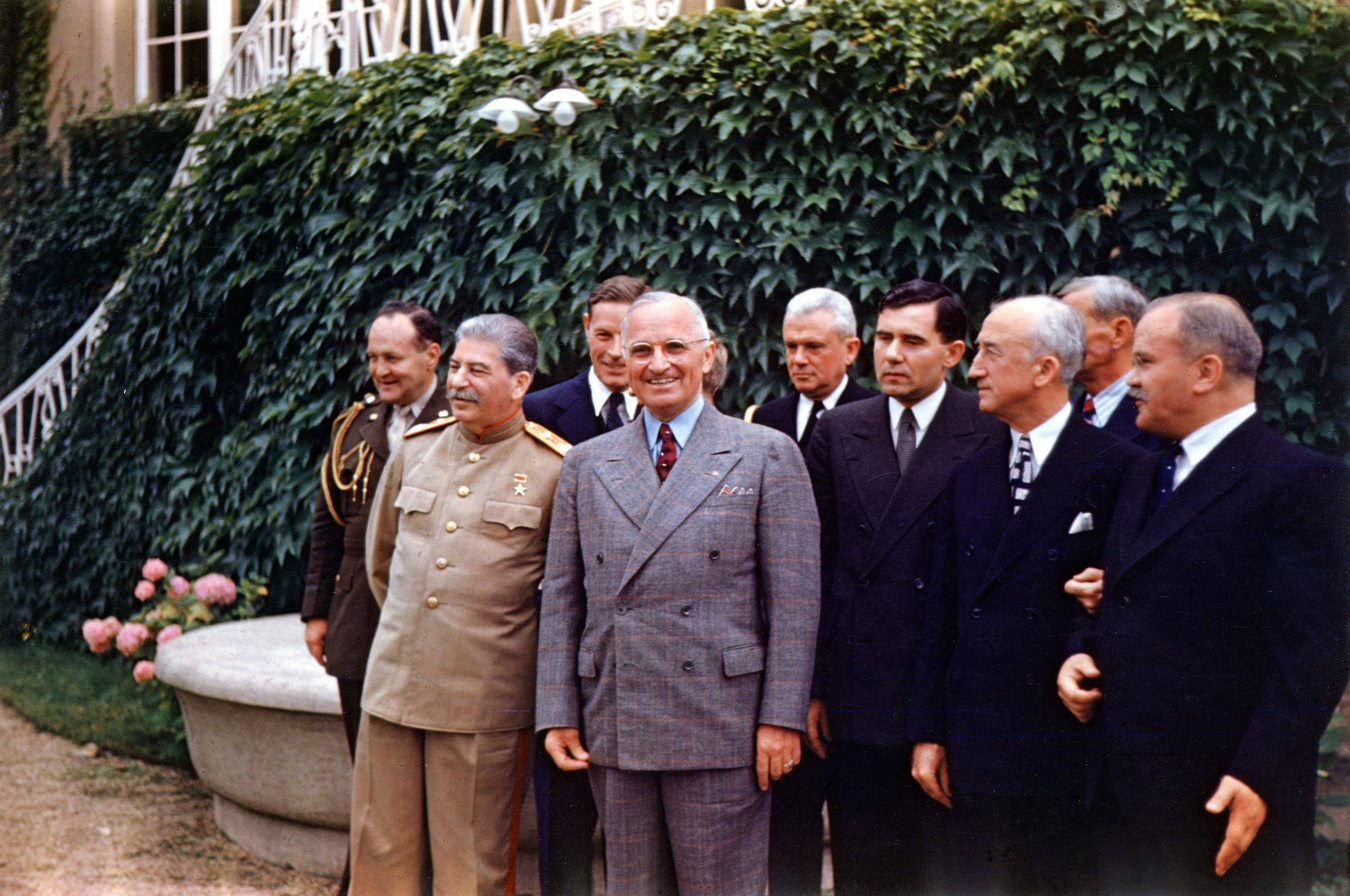
Harry S. Truman and Joseph Stalin meeting at the Potsdam Conference on July 18, 1945. From left to right, first row: Stalin, Truman, Soviet Ambassador Andrei Gromyko, Secretary of State James F. Byrnes, and Soviet Foreign Minister Vyacheslav Molotov. Second row: Truman confidant Harry H. Vaughan, Russian interpreter Charles Bohlen, Truman naval aide James K. Vardaman, Jr., and Charles Griffith Ross (partially obscured).

=== Potsdam and the atomic bomb ===
At the Potsdam Conference starting in late July 1945, the Allies met to decide how to administer the defeated Nazi Germany, which had agreed to unconditional surrender nine weeks earlier on May 7 and May 8, 1945, VE Day. Serious differences emerged over the future development of Germany and Eastern Europe. Administration officials favoring cooperation with the Soviet Union and the incorporation of socialist economies into a world trade system were marginalized. The UK was represented by a new prime minister, Clement Attlee, who had replaced Churchill after the Labour Party's defeat of the Conservatives in the 1945 general election.

The US had invited Britain into its atomic bomb project but kept it secret from the Soviet Union. Stalin became aware that the Americans were working on the atomic bomb through his spy network, however. One week after the end of the Potsdam Conference, the US bombed Hiroshima and Nagasaki. Shortly after the attacks, Stalin protested to US officials when Truman offered the Soviets little real influence in occupied Japan. Stalin was also outraged by the actual dropping of the bombs, calling them a “superbarbarity” and claiming that “the balance has been destroyed ... That cannot be”. The Truman administration intended to use its ongoing nuclear weapons program to pressure the Soviet Union in international relations.

The immediate end of war material shipments from America to the USSR after the surrender of Germany also upset some politicians in Moscow, who believed this showed the US had no intentions to support the USSR any more than they had to. Administration officials met with Soviet Foreign Minister Vyacheslav Molotov and others to press for an economically self-sufficient Germany, including a detailed accounting of the industrial plants, good and infrastructure already removed by the Soviets. After six weeks of negotiations, Molotov refused the demands and the talks were adjourned.

== Creation of the Eastern Bloc ==
Expansion of the USSR during World War II. The borders of Eastern bloc's members other than the USSR, Poland and Yugoslavia are shown in their post-war status.

A number of Eastern European countries (notably without Poland) were covered by Stalin's secret agreement with Winston Churchill concluded at the 4th Moscow Conference in 1944 and called the Percentages Agreement. This only became known about in 1953 when Churchill published his memoirs. Resis' research illustrates that Roosevelt was well aware of this agreement but only gave conditional support to Churchill after receiving updated information regarding the talks; however, prior to the meeting Roosevelt had informed Stalin that "in this global war, there is no question, political or military, that the United States is not interested" and as such, the 4th October 1944 is arguably the day the Cold War started.

The immediate post-1945 period may have been the historical high point for the popularity of communist ideology. The burdens the Red Army and the Soviet Union endured had earned it massive respect which, had it been fully exploited by Joseph Stalin, had a good chance of resulting in a communist Europe. Communist parties achieved a significant popularity in Greece, France and Italy, as well as in some nations outside of Europe such as China, Iran or the Republic of Mahabad. Communist parties had already come to power in Romania, Bulgaria, Albania, and Yugoslavia. The United Kingdom and the United States were concerned that electoral victories by communist parties in any of these countries could lead to sweeping economic and political change in Western Europe.

After the war, Stalin sought to secure the Soviet Union's western border by installing communist-dominated regimes under Soviet influence in bordering countries. During and in the years immediately after the war, the Soviet Union annexed several countries as Soviet Socialist Republics within the Union of Soviet Socialist Republics. Many of these were originally countries effectively ceded to it by Nazi Germany in the Molotov–Ribbentrop Pact, before Germany invaded the Soviet Union. These later annexed territories include Eastern Poland (incorporated into two different SSRs), Latvia (became Latvia SSR), Estonia (became Estonian SSR), Lithuania (became Lithuania SSR), part of eastern Finland (Karelo-Finnish SSR and annexed into the Russian SFSR) and northern Romania (became the Moldavian SSR).

In Hungary, when the Soviets installed a communist government, Mátyás Rákosi was appointed General Secretary of the Hungarian Communist Party, which began one of the harshest dictatorships in Europe under the People's Republic of Hungary. In Bulgaria, toward the end of World War II, the Soviet Union crossed the border and created the conditions for a communist coup d'état on the following night. The Soviet military commander in Sofia assumed supreme authority, and the communists whom he instructed, including Kimon Georgiev (who was not a communist himself, but a member of the elitarian political organization "Zveno", working together with the communists), took full control of domestic politics in the People's Republic of Bulgaria. In the Romanian general election of 1946, the Romanian Communist Party (PCR) employed widespread intimidation tactics and electoral fraud to obtain 80 percent of the vote and, thereafter, eliminated the role of the centrist parties and forced mergers, the result of which was that, by 1948, most non-Communist politicians were either executed, in exile or in prison. In the December 1945 Albanian election, the only effective ballot choices were those of the communist Democratic Front (Albania), led by Enver Hoxha. In 1946, Albania was declared the People's Republic of Albania.

The defining characteristic of the Stalinist communism implemented in Eastern Bloc states was the unique symbiosis of the state with society and the economy, resulting in politics and economics losing their distinctive features as autonomous and distinguishable spheres. Initially, Stalin directed systems that rejected Western institutional characteristics of market economies, democratic governance (dubbed "bourgeois democracy" in Soviet parlance) and the rule of law subduing discretional intervention by the state. They were economically communist and depended upon the Soviet Union for significant amounts of materials. While in the first five years following World War II, massive emigration from these states to the West occurred, restrictions implemented thereafter stopped most East-West migration, except that under limited bilateral and other agreements.

=== Yugoslavia ===
On 29 November 1945, the Federal People's Republic of Yugoslavia was proclaimed. It was under Soviet influence in the final months of the war and the first few post-war years, Stalin declared it outside the Soviet sphere of interest on several occasions, treating it like a satellite state. The contrast with the rest of Eastern Europe was underscored ahead of a Soviet offensive in October 1944. Tito's Partisans supported the offensive, which ultimately pushed the Wehrmacht and its allies out of northern Serbia and captured Belgrade. Marshal Fyodor Tolbukhin's Third Ukrainian Front had to request formal permission from Tito's provisional government to enter Yugoslavia and had to accept Yugoslav civil authority in any liberated territory. which maintained its claims against Italy and Austria. The territorial dispute in the northwest part of Istria peninsula and around the city of Trieste caused the Treaty of Peace with Italy to be delayed until 1947, and establishment of the independent Free Territory of Trieste. This did not satisfy Tito as he sought revisions of the borders around Trieste and in Carinthia prompting the Western Allies to keep a garrison in Trieste to prevent Yugoslav takeover. Tito's continued insistence on acquisition of Trieste was also seen by Stalin as an embarrassment to the Italian Communist Party. On 10 January 1945, Stalin called Yugoslavia's foreign policy unreasonable because of its territorial claims against most of its neighbours, The USSR and Yugoslavia signed a friendship treaty when Tito met with Stalin in Moscow in April 1945.

== Origins of containment ==
=== "Long Telegram" and "Mr. X" ===
Key State Department personnel grew increasingly frustrated with and suspicious of the Soviets as the war drew to a close. Averell Harriman, US Ambassador in Moscow, once a "confirmed optimist" regarding US–Soviet relations, was disillusioned by what he saw as the Soviet betrayal of the 1944 Warsaw Uprising as well as by violations of the February 1945 Yalta Agreement concerning Poland. Harriman would later have a significant influence in forming Truman's views on the Soviet Union.

In February 1946, the US State Department asked George F. Kennan, then at the US Embassy in Moscow, why the Russians opposed the creation of the World Bank and the International Monetary Fund. He responded with a wide-ranging analysis of Russian policy now called the Long Telegram:

Soviet power, unlike that of Hitlerite Germany, is neither schematic nor adventuristic. It does not work by fixed plans. It does not take unnecessary risks. Impervious to logic of reason, and it is highly sensitive to logic of force. For this reason it can easily withdraw—and usually does when strong resistance is encountered at any point.

Kennan's cable was hailed in the State Department as "the appreciation of the situation that had long been needed." Kennan himself attributed the enthusiastic reception to timing: "Six months earlier the message would probably have been received in the State Department with raised eyebrows and lips pursed in disapproval. Six months later, it would probably have sounded redundant." Clark Clifford and George Elsey produced a report elaborating on the Long Telegram and proposing concrete policy recommendations based on its analysis. This report, which recommended "restraining and confining" Soviet influence, was presented to Truman on September 24, 1946.

=== "Iron Curtain" speech ===
On March 5, 1946, Winston Churchill, while at Westminster College in Fulton, Missouri, gave his speech "The Sinews of Peace", declaring that an "iron curtain" had descended across Europe. From the standpoint of the Soviets, the speech was an incitement for the West to begin a war with the USSR, as it called for an Anglo-American alliance against the Soviets.

=== Morgenthau and Marshall Plans ===
Having lost 20 million people in the war, suffered German invasion twice in 30 years, and suffered tens of millions of casualties from onslaughts from the West three times in the preceding 150 years, the Soviet Union was determined to destroy Germany's capacity for another war. This was in alignment with the Allied policy which had foreseen returning Germany to a pastoral state without heavy industry (the Morgenthau Plan). On September 6, 1946, US Secretary of State James F. Byrnes made a speech in Germany, repudiating the Morgenthau Plan and warning the Soviets that the US intended to maintain a military presence in Europe indefinitely. (see Restatement of Policy on Germany) As Byrnes admitted one month later, "The nub of our program was to win the German people [...] it was a battle between us and Russia over minds ...". Because of the increasing costs of food imports to avoid mass-starvation in Germany, and with the danger of losing the entire nation to communism, the US government abandoned the Morgenthau plan in September 1946 with Secretary of State James F. Byrnes's speech Restatement of Policy on Germany. In January 1947, Truman appointed General George Marshall as Secretary of State, scrapped Joint Chiefs of Staff (JCS) directive 1067, which embodied the Morgenthau Plan and supplanted it with JCS 1779, which decreed that an orderly and prosperous Europe requires the economic contributions of a stable and productive Germany".

=== Greece and Italy ===
In Greece, during a civil war involving the communist-led partisan movement ELAS-EAM, British Special Forces terminated arms supplies to the ELA-ELAM, pro-monarchist armed forces were strengthened. On the political front, Americans, with British encouragement, attempted to dismantle ELAS-EAM socialist structures in the countryside, and an anti-communist swing gradually occurred.

Western Allies conducted meetings in Italy in March 1945 with German representatives to forestall a takeover by Italian communist resistance forces in northern Italy and to hinder the potential there for post-war influence of the civilian Italian Communist Party. The affair caused a major rift between Stalin and Churchill, and in a letter to Roosevelt on 3 April Stalin complained that the secret negotiations did not serve to "preserve and promote trust between our countries".

=== Soviet military perspective ===
The Soviet military was focused on its main mission, the defense of the Soviet Union. From that perspective, the formation of NATO in 1949 was the decisive threat, and became its starting point for the Cold War. Historian David Glantz argues that:

Militarily, the Soviets considered themselves threatened by, first, the United States's atomic monopoly (broken in 1949) and, second, by the emergence of United States dominated military alliances, the most menacing of which was NATO. The Soviet Union responded strategically by preserving a large, expandable peacetime military establishment, keeping large military forces in conquered regions of Eastern Europe, and cloaking these forces within the political guise of an alliance (the Warsaw Pact), Which could contend with NATO on a multilateral basis. The major thrust of Soviet military strategy was to possess a conventional military force whose offensive capabilities could check Western nuclear and conventional military power.

== Other regions ==
The Cold War took place worldwide, but it had a somewhat different timing and trajectory outside Europe. In Africa, decolonization took place first; it was largely accomplished in the 1950s. The main rivals then sought bases of support in the new national political alignments.

=== Latin America ===
During World War II, the United States military operations had widespread support across Latin America, except for Argentina. After 1947, with the Cold War emerging in Europe, Washington made repeated efforts to encourage all the Latin American countries to take a Cold War anti-Communist position. They were reluctant to do so—for example, only Colombia sent soldiers to the United Nations Command in the Korean War. The Soviet Union was quite weak across Latin America. Not until the late 1950s did Moscow achieve diplomatic or commercial relationships with most Latin American countries., Before then it had only two trade agreements (with Argentina and Mexico). The communist movements that had existed in Brazil and elsewhere in the 1930s had been disbanded or outlawed. Washington exaggerated the dangers, and decided on a preemptive attack against a possible communist threat. It sought anti-communist resolutions at the annual meetings of the Pan American Union (renamed the Organization of American States (OAS) in 1948) and paid special attention to the growth of left-wing forces in Guatemala. A compromise was reached whereby the Latin American states agreed on vague statements of support for the American Cold War position, and the United States provided expanded financial grants and loans to stimulate economic growth. In 1954, at the 10th Inter-American Conference in Caracas, Washington demanded a resolution that the establishment of a communist government in any American state was a threat to the peace of the Western Hemisphere. Guatemala cast the only negative vote. The Guatemalan Armed Forces, with CIA encouragement, overthrew its left-wing government later that year. Fidel Castro engineered his revolutionary takeover of Cuba in 1957–58 with very little Soviet support. The United States and the smaller Latin countries, outvoted the larger powers by the required two-thirds majority in 1962 to identify Cuba as a communist regime and suspend it from the OAS.

=== Asia-Pacific ===
After the war ended, British Malaya was plunged into a state of emergency as British and Commonwealth forces fought a protracted counter-insurgency war against their former communist-led Malayan Peoples' Anti-Japanese Army ally, who had fought the Japanese occupation and now demanded independence from the British Empire. In British Hong Kong, which had surrendered to Japan in December 1941, civil unrest occurred after Britain rapidly re-established rule at the end of the war.

Australia's entry into the Cold War came in 1950, when it rushed combat air and sea forces into the Korean War, two days after the Americans did. Australian Prime Minister Robert Menzies received a hero's welcome in Washington. The ANZUS military alliance with New Zealand and the United States was signed in July 1951; it was a plan for consultation and did not involve military planning like NATO. Public opinion in Australia was intensely hostile to Japan after its wartime atrocities, but Japan was now an ally in the Cold War, so Australia's accepted the very generous soft peace treaty with Japan in 1951. Instead of worrying about a resurgent Japan, Australia now worried more about a possible Chinese threat.

==== China ====
Following decades of struggle, the Chinese Communist Party under Mao Zedong defeated Chiang Kai-shek's National Revolutionary Army and established a new Marxist–Leninist state in mainland China in 1949, the Nationalist government leaders and much of the Republic of China's upper class fled to Taiwan. Before this, Stalin had in fact supported greatly Chiang Kai-shek's party, while giving help to the CCP in the same time. The United States had tried in 1945–1947 to bring the Nationalists and Communists together in a coalition, but had no success. The conflict was hence not a typical aspect of the Cold War between US and USSR until the 1950s. As the Korean War broke out, US started to provide a larger support to the Nationalist China on the island Taiwan. On the other hand, Communist China came to the North Korea's aid in the Korean War in late 1950, pushed back the UN force and escalated the hostility towards the US.

==== Vietnam ====
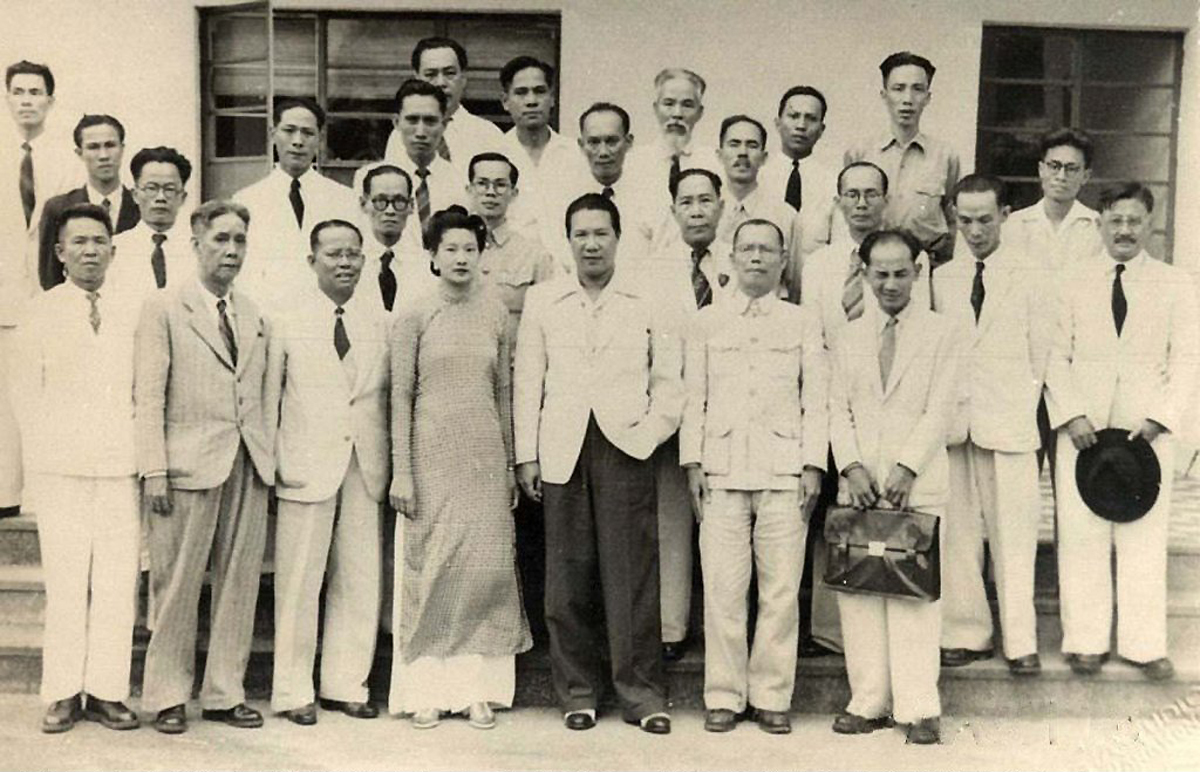
Exiled Vietnamese nationalists rally around Bảo Đại in support of a non-communist alternative for Vietnam, 1947 in Hong Kong.

The Vietnamese were locked in a civil war over the destiny of their post-colonial state after the ousting of the French and the surrender of Japan in 1945. The communist-controlled Viet Minh sought to consolidate power by terrorizing and purging rival Vietnamese nationalist groups amid the French reconquest. Tensions between the Viet Minh, led by Ho Chi Minh, and the French erupted into the First Indochina War in December 1946. From early on, the Vietnamese communists were deeply committed to a radical ideology, occasionally harboring ambitions to lead the world revolution. In 1949, Mao's communists took control of the north side of the China–Vietnam border, and began supporting the Democratic Republic of Viet Nam (DRV). Mark Lawrence and Frederik Logevall point out that "resurgent French colonialism became inextricably intertwined with Cold War tensions, especially in the years after 1949". American pressure on France after 1949 tried to force France to give priority to fighting communism, rather than fighting Vietnamese nationalism. The nationalist State of Vietnam (SVN), with Bảo Đại as Chief of State, was established and positioned within the anticommunist Western Bloc. With the recognition of the DRV by communist China and the Soviet Union, and the recognition of the SVN by the United States in 1950, the civil war and the colonial war in Vietnam became internationalized and intertwined with the global Cold War. While Vietnam was affected by the Cold War, the country's factions also affected the Cold War, especially through the remarkable and calculated efforts of Vietnamese leaders to leverage superpower rivalry to their own advantage.

=== Middle East ===
The political situation in Iran was a flashpoint between the major players in 1945–1946, with the Soviet Union sponsoring two breakaway provinces in northern Iran, adjacent to the Azerbaijan Soviet Socialist Republic. Soviet troops were stationed in northwestern Iran as part of the Anglo-Soviet invasion of Iran during the war. They not only refused to withdraw in 1945 but backed revolts that established short-lived, pro-Soviet separatist national states called the Azerbaijan People's Government and the Republic of Kurdistan. The issue was debated at the United Nations, and in 1946 Moscow abandoned its position, and the conflict was permanently resolved peacefully, with a pro-western government resuming control. Iran did not become a major battlefield of the Cold War, but it had its own history of confrontation with Britain and the United States.

The long-standing conflict between Arabs and Jews in Mandatory Palestine continued after 1945, with Britain and in an increasingly impossible situation as the mandate holder. The Balfour Declaration of 1917 calling for a homeland for the Jews was supported in 1947 by both the Soviet Union and the United States. Both countries promptly Recognize the independent state of Israel in 1948. The Soviet Union later broke with Israel to support its Arab enemies. The region was more of an independent trouble zone rather than a playing field of the Cold War, and was not a precipitating factor in the Cold War.

By 1953, Arab nationalism based in Egypt was a neutralizing force. The Soviet Union leaned increasingly toward Egypt. The United States based its Cold War coalition primarily on the Baghdad Pact of 1955 which formed Central Treaty Organization (CENTO), that included Iran, Iraq, Pakistan, Turkey and the United Kingdom.

== Historians on the causes of the Cold War ==
While most historians trace its origins to the period immediately following World War II, others argue that it began with the October Revolution in Russia in 1917 when the Bolsheviks took power. In 1919 Lenin stated that his new state was surrounded by a "hostile capitalist encirclement", and he viewed diplomacy as a weapon that should be used in order to keep the Soviet Union's enemies divided. He began with a new Communist International ("Comintern"), based in Moscow, which was designed to plan for revolutionary upheavals abroad. It was ineffective—Communist uprisings all failed in Germany, Hungary and elsewhere. Historian Max Beloff argues that the Soviets saw "no prospect of permanent peace", with the 1922 Soviet Constitution proclaiming:

Since the time of the formation of the soviet republics, the states of the world have divided into two camps: the camp of capitalism and the camp of socialism. There—in the camp of capitalism—national enmity and inequality, colonial slavery, and chauvinism, national oppression and pogroms, imperialist brutalities and wars. Here —in the camp of socialism —mutual confidence and peace, national freedom and equality, a dwelling together in peace and the brotherly collaboration of peoples.

According to British historian Christopher Sutton:

In what some have called the First Cold War, from Britain's intervention in the Russian Civil War in 1918 to its uneasy alliance with the Soviet Union against the Axis powers in 1941, British distrust of the revolutionary and regicidal Bolsheviks resulted in domestic, foreign, and colonial policies aimed at resisting the spread of communism. This conflict after 1945 took on new battlefields, new weapons, new players, and a greater intensity, but it was still fundamentally a conflict against Soviet imperialism (real and imagined).

The idea of long-term continuity is a minority scholarly view that has been challenged. Frank Ninkovich writes:

As for the two cold wars thesis, the chief problem is that the two periods are incommensurable. To be sure, they were joined together by enduring ideological hostility, but in the post-World War I years Bolshevism was not a geopolitical menace. After World War II, in contrast, the Soviet Union was a superpower that combined ideological antagonism with the kind of geopolitical threat posed by Germany and Japan in the Second World War. Even with more amicable relations in the 1920s, it is conceivable that post-1945 relations would have turned out much the same.

The usage of the term "Cold War" to describe the postwar tensions between the US- and Soviet-led blocs was popularized by Bernard Baruch, a US financier and an adviser to Harry Truman, who used the term during a speech before the South Carolina state legislature on April 16, 1947.

Since the term "Cold War" was popularized in 1947, there has been extensive disagreement in many political and scholarly discourses on what exactly were the sources of postwar tensions. In the American historiography, there has been disagreement as to who was responsible for the quick unraveling of the wartime alliance between 1945 and 1947, and on whether the conflict between the two superpowers was inevitable or could have been avoided. Discussion of these questions has centered in large part on the works of William Appleman Williams, Walter LaFeber, Gabriel Kolko and John Lewis Gaddis.

Officials in the Truman administration placed responsibility for postwar tensions on the Soviets, claiming that Stalin had violated promises made at Yalta, pursued a policy of expansionism in Eastern Europe, and conspired to spread communism throughout the world. Historians associated with the "Wisconsin School" of diplomatic history such as Williams, however, placed responsibility for the breakdown of postwar peace mostly on the US, citing a range of US efforts to isolate and confront the Soviet Union well before the end of World War II. According to Williams and later writers influenced by his work—such as LaFeber, author of the popular survey text America, Russia, and the Cold War (published in ten editions between 1967 and 2006)—US policymakers shared an overarching concern with maintaining capitalism domestically. In order to ensure this goal, they pursued a policy of ensuring an "Open Door" to foreign markets for US business and agriculture across the world. From this perspective, a growing economy domestically went hand-in-hand with the consolidation of US power internationally.

Williams and LaFeber also dismissed the assumption that Soviet leaders were committed to postwar "expansionism". They cited evidence that Soviet Union's occupation of Eastern Europe had a defensive rationale, and Soviet leaders saw themselves as attempting to avoid encirclement by the United States and its allies. From this view, the Soviet Union was so weak and devastated after the end of the Second World War as to be unable to pose any serious threat to the US, which emerged after 1945 as the sole world power not economically devastated by the war, and also as the sole possessor of the atomic bomb until 1949.

Gaddis, however, argues that the conflict was less the lone fault of one side or the other and more the result of a plethora of conflicting interests and misperceptions between the two superpowers, propelled by domestic politics and bureaucratic inertia. While Gaddis does not hold either side as entirely responsible for the onset of the conflict, he argues that the Soviets should be held at least slightly more accountable for the problems. According to Gaddis, Stalin was in a much better position to compromise than his Western counterparts, given his much broader power within his own regime than Truman, who had to contend with Congress and was often undermined by vociferous political opposition at home. Gaddis further recognises the role of personal politics, combined with Truman's inexperience in foreign affairs and "abrasive personality", in the breakdown of the Grand Alliance. Personal politics played a role in how Truman dealt with Stalin, and in the Russians seeing Roosevelt's post-war plans as deserted. Asking if it were possible to predict if the wartime alliance would fall apart within a matter of months, leaving in its place nearly a half century of cold war, Gaddis wrote in a 1997 essay, "Geography, demography, and tradition contributed to this outcome but did not determine it. It took men, responding unpredictably to circumstances, to forge the chain of causation; and it took [Stalin] in particular, responding predictably to his own authoritarian, paranoid, and narcissistic predisposition, to lock it into place".

Historians have also considered interpersonal dynamics in the causes of the Cold War. Discussion on politics as personal has stressed the importance of the personalities and emotions of the Big Three in the breakdown of their wartime alliance. Frank Costigliola has emphasised how the Cold War blurred the lines between the personal and political, with Roosevelt's death marking a turning point in US-Soviet relations. Costigliola maintains that Roosevelt's personal rapport and diplomacy with Stalin maintained cooperation, while Truman, taking a more aggressive policy, a shift driven by his eagerness to prove himself as president, disrupted this cooperation. Costigliola argues that this shift in leadership brought "emotional disposition" and "divisive discourses", contributing to the breakdown of the Grand Alliance, and accelerating the onset of the Cold War.

Global historian Prasenjit Duara has placed the issue in a global context:

The Cold War is increasingly treated as a global historical period beginning customarily in 1947 when the Truman Doctrine sought to contain communism and the expansion of Soviet influence, and ending with the decline and fall of the Soviet Union and the Eastern bloc in the late 1980s.

== See also ==
- The Great Game
- Culture during the Cold War
- Historiography of the Cold War
- Non-Aligned Movement

== Sources ==
- Banac, Ivo (1988). With Stalin against Tito: Cominformist Splits in Yugoslav Communism. Ithaca, New York: Cornell University Press. ISBN 0-8014-2186-1.
- Banac, Ivo (2008). "Introduction". In Banac, Ivo (ed.). The Diary of Georgi Dimitrov, 1933–1949. New Haven: Yale University Press. pp. xv–xlviii. ISBN 978-0-300-13385-1.
- Beschloss, Michael R. (2003), The Conquerors: Roosevelt, Truman and the Destruction of Hitler's Germany, 1941–1945, Simon and Schuster, ISBN 978-0-7432-6085-5
- Böcker, Anita (1998), Regulation of Migration: International Experiences, Het Spinhuis, ISBN 978-90-5589-095-8
- Cook, Bernard A. (2001). Europe Since 1945: An Encyclopedia. Taylor & Francis. ISBN 0-8153-4057-5.
- Ericson, Edward E. (1999), Feeding the German Eagle: Soviet Economic Aid to Nazi Germany, 1933–1941, Greenwood Publishing Group, ISBN 978-0-275-96337-8
- Gaddis, John Lewis (1990), Russia, the Soviet Union, and the United States— An Interpretive History
- Gaddis, John Lewis (2005). The Cold War: A New History. Penguin Press. ISBN 978-1-59420-062-5.
- Hardt, John Pearce; Kaufman, Richard F. (1995), East-Central European Economies in Transition, M.E. Sharpe, ISBN 978-1-56324-612-8
- Judt, Tony (2005). Postwar: A History of Europe Since 1945. New York: Penguin Press. ISBN 1-59420-065-3.
- LaFeber, Walter (2002). America, Russia, and the Cold War, 1945–2002. McGraw-Hill. ISBN 978-0-07-284903-5.
- Larson, Deborah Welch (1985), Origins of Containment: A Psychological Explanation, Princeton University Press, ISBN 9780691076911
- Lee, Stephen J. (1999), Stalin and the Soviet Union, Routledge, ISBN 978-0-415-18573-8
- McClellan, Woodford (1969). "Postwar Political Evolution". In Vucinich, Wayne S. (ed.). Contemporary Yugoslavia: Twenty Years of Socialist Experiment. Berkeley, California: University of California Press. pp. 119–153. ISBN 978-0-520-33110-5.
- Miller, Roger Gene (2000), To Save a City: The Berlin Airlift, 1948–1949, Texas A&M University Press, ISBN 978-0-89096-967-0
- Perović, Jeronim (2007). "The Tito–Stalin Split: A Reassessment in Light of New Evidence". Journal of Cold War Studies. 9 (2). MIT Press: 32–63. doi:10.5167/uzh-62735. ISSN 1520-3972.
- Roberts, Geoffrey (2006), Stalin's Wars: From World War to Cold War, 1939–1953, Yale University Press, ISBN 978-0-300-11204-7
- Shirer, William L. (1990), The Rise and Fall of the Third Reich: A History of Nazi Germany, Simon and Schuster, ISBN 978-0-671-72868-7
- Skidmore, Thomas E.; Smith, Peter H. (2005), Modern Latin America (6th ed.)
- Tucker, Robert C. (1992), Stalin in Power: The Revolution from Above, 1928–1941, W. W. Norton & Company, ISBN 978-0-393-30869-3
- Wettig, Gerhard (2008), Stalin and the Cold War in Europe, Rowman & Littlefield, ISBN 978-0-7425-5542-6
- Ziemke, Earl F. (1968). Stalingrad to Berlin: The German Defeat in the East. Washington, D.C.: United States Army Center of Military History. ISBN 978-0-88029-059-3. LCCN 67-60001.
