= Carl Parrini =

American historian

Carl Parrini (February 22, 1933 - December 13, 2016) was an American historian. For many years he taught at Northern Illinois University. He was a specialist in US diplomatic history. Born in Rochester, New York, he attended the University of Wisconsin-Milwaukee before transferring to and graduating from the University of Wisconsin-Madison, where he received a B.A. (1955). He continued there as a graduate student, where he studied closely with Fred Harvey Harrington, Howard K. Beale, and Merrill Jensen, receiving his M.A. in 1956. William A. Williams directed his doctoral dissertation, a study of U.S. economic diplomacy during the Woodrow Wilson and Warren G. Harding administrations that Parrini completed in 1963. He was in an academic cohort at Madison, influenced by Williams, that included Walter LaFeber, Lloyd C. Gardner, Thomas J. McCormick, David Healy, and Robert F. Smith, often referred to as the "Wisconsin school" in the historiography of United States foreign relations. He taught at Lake Forest College, Ohio University, the University of Michigan, and the University of California, Los Angeles before landing a tenure-track position at Northern Illinois.

== Bibliography ==
- Heir to Empire: United States Economic Diplomacy, 1916-1923 (1969)
- Parrini and Martin J. Sklar, "New Thinking about the Marker, 1896-1904: Some American Economists on Investment and the Theory of Surplus Capital," Journal of Economic History 43:3 (September 1983): 559-578.
- "Theories of Imperialism," in Lloyd C. Gardner, ed., Redefining the Past: Essays in Diplomatic History in Honor of William Appleman Williams (Corvallis: Oregon State University Press, 1986): 65-84.
- "Charles A. Conant, Economic Crises and Foreign Policy, 1896-1903" in Thomas J. McCormick and Walter LaFeber, eds., Behind the Throne: Servants of Power to Imperial Presidents, 1898-1968 (Madison: University of Wisconsin Press, 1993): 35-66.
