= Wisconsin School (diplomatic history) =

Academic school of thought

The Wisconsin School of American diplomatic history is a school of thought that emerged from the history department of the University of Wisconsin in the 1950s and 1960s. The school, exemplified by the work of William Appleman Williams and also including as core members Walter LaFeber, Thomas J. McCormick, and Lloyd Gardner, generally holds that economic reasons, and the desire for increased markets abroad, were the driver behind much of American foreign policy and the creation of an American empire during the 19th century. These beliefs – which consigned to subordinate status other possible explanations such as morality, security, and balance-of-power calculations – have been referred to as the "Open Door Interpretation", in reference to the Open Door Notes of 1899 and 1900.

Two ongoing world events highlighted the influence and debate over Wisconsin School thought. One was the historiography of the Cold War, where "revisionist" theories held by the school stated that the United States bore a large share of the responsibility for the breakdown in post–World War II relations with the Soviet Union. The other was criticism of the Vietnam War. The Tragedy of American Diplomacy, the 1959 work that Williams became best known for, became heavily referenced by many of those participating in opposition to United States involvement in the Vietnam War, and dissatisfaction with the war boosted the popularity of the Open Door interpretation. But works of the Wisconsin School focused not just on causes of the Cold War or Vietnam, but the entire course of American expansion from the time of the nation's creation. The tenets of the Wisconsin School have been incorporated to some degree by other lines of scholarly thought in the decades since and still remain influential.

== Background and members ==
Forebears to the Wisconsin School include Charles A. Beard and his economically determined theories of American history that became widely read in the early 20th century before later becoming unpopular. A more direct antecedent was the influence and intellectual mentoring of Wisconsin professor Fred Harvey Harrington, under whom Williams studied.

In part the ideas of the Wisconsin School were due to the nature of the department itself. As American historian Emily S. Rosenberg has written, "While many other history departments across the country celebrated cold-war orthodoxies, exiling economic interpretations from respectability and removing Beard from reading lists, Wisconsin maintained an attachment to economic interpretation and to independent, unorthodox thinking."

The immediate founder, and the most well-known exponent, of the Wisconsin School was William Appleman Williams and especially his 1959 book The Tragedy of American Diplomacy. As British historian John A. Thompson has written, "this work may well have had a greater influence of the historiography of US foreign policy than any other."

Williams was followed in visibility by several of his students, most notably Walter LaFeber, but also Thomas J. McCormick and Lloyd Gardner. Their work helped gain the "Wisconsin School of diplomatic history" a national reputation. (After Williams left Wisconsin for Oregon State University in the late 1960s, McCormick replaced him on the faculty there.) Another scholar sometimes associated with the Wisconsin School is Carl Parrini.

Of other people at Wisconsin, some have considered David F. Healey and Robert Freeman Smith to be at least partly a member of the school, but they are distinct in not holding commercial factors to be the primary factor above all in explaining American policy.

Students of Williams who carried forward his themes have included Edward P. Crapol, Howard Schonberger, Tom E. Terrill, and others.

== Characteristics ==
As always, any such school of thought ends up containing some different viewpoints, and it should not be assumed that everyone coming out of seminars led by Harrington or others at the department adopted the same approach. LaFeber himself made this point by referring to "a supposed 'Wisconsin School of Diplomatic History'" in a 1993 essay about Harrington and pointing to the variety of scholarly perspectives emerging from Wisconsin at the time.

And before that, Williams had said in a 1978 essay that the Wisconsin seminars were not as tightly directed as some apparently thought, that no collection of thought came out of the department that was as clearly defined as, say, the Frankfurt School of social history, and that mention of the "Wisconsin School" brought about more "professional discussion (and gossip)" than warranted. In particular, he pointed out that he, LaFeber, McCormick, and Gardner differed to the degree in which they saw a coherent "Open Doors worldview" being acted upon by American policymakers. Furthermore, it is generally thought that LaFeber and McCormick were more subtle in their approach than Williams.

The Wisconsin School has often been conflated with the New Left. While members of each found themselves allied at times, the two were distinct: New Left critiques tended to be a good deal more radical both in analysis and in proposed solutions. Wisconsin School members thought that it was possible for American decisionmakers to correct their overemphasis on markets and that doing so would make for a more effective American diplomacy. In contrast, historians associated with the New Left, such as Gabriel Kolko, more often subscribed to Marxist interpretations and believed that there were fundamental structural causes, due to the needs of American capitalism, behind American foreign policy and that little could reverse that short of an outright remaking of the economic system.

Moreover, Williams left the University of Wisconsin in the late 1960s in part because he disliked the militant direction that student protests were taking there. Furthermore, Robert Freeman Smith – who has also sometimes been grouped in with the Wisconsin School – has remarked that "if there is such a thing as the Wisconsin School of Diplomatic History it has to be an ecumenical school. There is not one party line because Fred [Harvey Harrington] had a number of different students, both liberal and conservative." Harrington later voiced similar thoughts, saying that "the Wisconsin School of diplomatic history ought not to be just associated with the New Left."

Following the end of the Vietnam War in the 1970s, and then again following the conclusion of the Cold War in the early 1990s, the Wisconsin School's work became less controversial. Other historians adopted much of its scholarship and some of its conclusions, albeit in a more partial form. As a biography of Williams has stated, "the Wisconsin School as a body of thought ... was renewed in virtually ceaseless diaspora of individuals and generations."
