= William Appleman Williams =

American historian (1921–1990)

- Born: June 12, 1921; Near Atlantic, Iowa, US
- Died: March 5, 1990 (aged 68); Newport, Oregon, US

Academic background
- Education: University of Wisconsin
- Doctoral advisor: Fred Harvey Harrington
- Other advisor: William Best Hesseltine
- Influences: C. Wright Mills; Charles A. Beard

Academic work
- Discipline: History
- Doctoral students: Walter LaFeber; Thomas J. McCormick; Lloyd Gardner; Jim Ranchino; Carl Parrini

William Appleman Williams (June 12, 1921 – March 5, 1990) was one of the 20th century's most prominent revisionist historians of American diplomacy. He achieved the height of his influence while on the faculty of the department of history at the University of Wisconsin–Madison and is considered to be the foremost member of the "Wisconsin School" of diplomatic history.

== Early life and education ==
Williams was born and raised in the small town of Atlantic, Iowa. He attended Kemper Military School in Boonville, Missouri, then earned a degree in engineering at the United States Naval Academy in Annapolis. He graduated and was commissioned an ensign in 1945. After serving in the South Pacific as an executive officer aboard a Landing Ship Medium, he was stationed in Corpus Christi, Texas, where he made plans to become an aviator like his father. His father had been in the Army Air Corps until he died in a plane crash in 1929.

A wartime back injury caused enormous pain and ended his chances at becoming a naval aviator after the war. He requested a medical discharge from the navy in 1946 and moved to University of Wisconsin–Madison to begin graduate studies in 1947. He earned a master's degree and a PhD there and came under the influence of the Beardian historians, especially Fred Harvey Harrington, Merle Curti, and Howard K. Beale. After teaching at various other colleges, he returned to Madison in 1957 to teach in the history department.

== Career ==
Williams completed his M.S. in 1948 and his Ph.D. in 1950. Subsequent additional research led to his first book, an expansion and revision of his doctoral thesis, published as American-Russian Relations, 1781-1947 (1952). In the meantime, Williams pursued a series of appointments. His first, to Washington and Jefferson College, came in 1950. The following academic year (1951–52) Williams taught at Ohio State University, but (according to Williams) he had a faculty dispute with Woody Hayes (in his first year as football coach and, like Williams, a former naval officer) over low grades for a football player that Williams would not change, the incident apparently leading to his needing to find another appointment.

In the fall of 1952, Williams took up a tenure-track appointment to the University of Oregon where he would remain for five years (with a year in Madison, Wisconsin, again on a Ford Fellowship from 1955 to 1956). When Fred Harvey Harrington became the chair of the history department at the University of Wisconsin in 1957, he arranged for an unusual direct appointment of Williams as his replacement in teaching U.S. foreign relations. Williams accepted the tenure-track appointment and returned to Wisconsin in the fall of 1957 and remained there until 1968.

Williams was a member of the Fair Play for Cuba Committee.

=== The Tragedy of American Diplomacy ===
Graduate students found his challenges to the established historiography quite compelling and flocked to the university to study with him, regardless of their fields. The same year that his most influential book, The Tragedy of American Diplomacy, was published, Williams's students who were members of the campus's Socialist Club, began publication of Studies on the Left, a manifesto of the emerging New Left in the United States. Like Williams, its articles offered a critique of the dominant liberalism, but after it moved to offices to New York in 1963, the club reflected less of his thinking and gradually declined and expired.

Williams departed from the mainstream of U.S. historiography in the 1950s. Whereas many U.S. historians wrote the story of the United States in terms of the expansion and spread of freedom, Williams argued that the U.S. had also expanded as an empire. Williams's "central conception of American diplomacy", one critic has written, is that it was shaped "by the effort of American leaders to evade the domestic dilemmas of race and class through an escapist movement: they used world politics, he feels, to preserve a capitalist frontier safe for America's market and investment expansion". In this regard, Williams's understanding of American history owes a considerable debt to Frederick Jackson Turner and the first generation of American progressive historians. Because his history of American diplomacy pivots on John Hay's Open Door Notes to China–at around the same time as the closing of the internal American frontier–Williams's larger argument is sometimes referred to as the "Open Door thesis". In The Tragedy of American Diplomacy, Williams described the Open Door Policy as "America's version of the liberal policy of informal empire or free trade imperialism."

Williams maintained that the United States was more responsible for the Cold War than the Soviet Union. Williams argued that American politicians, fearful of a loss of markets in Europe, had exaggerated the threat of world domination from the Soviet Union. Amid much criticism, Williams made no moral distinction between the foreign policy of Joseph Stalin in Eastern Europe and the foreign policy of the United States in Latin America, Africa, or Asia. In the context of the Soviet invasion of Hungary in 1956, he went out of his way in an expanded second edition of The Tragedy of American Diplomacy (1962) to strongly criticize the behavior of the Soviet Union, but he noted the Kennedy Administration's Bay of Pigs Invasion of Cuba as a parallel behavior. The difference in domestic policy between Stalin's Soviet Union and American democracy, he argued, made the U.S. embrace of empire all the more "tragic."

Williams' The Tragedy of American Diplomacy is often described as one of the most influential books written on American foreign policy. Bradford Perkins, a traditionalist diplomatic historian emeritus at the University of Michigan, said this in a twenty-five-year retrospective on Tragedy: "The influence of William Appleman Williams's The Tragedy of American Diplomacy... is beyond challenge". Tragedy brought Williams to the attention of not only academics but also American policymakers. Adolf A. Berle, a former member of FDR's Brain Trust, was quite impressed with Williams after reading Tragedy and meeting him in person in Madison asked if he would be his "personal first assistant" in the new position Berle had taken in the Kennedy Administration as the head of an interdepartmental task force on Latin America. Williams turned down the offer to serve in the Kennedy Administration and later claimed that he was glad he had because of Kennedy's sponsorship of the Bay of Pigs invasion.

Williams' historical success is consequent of his revisionist school of thought. His unorthodox ideology has become more recognised and celebrated since The Tragedy of American Diplomacy. According to a review by Richard A. Melanson, focusing particularly on Williams' historiography, "his influence on a generation of American diplomatic historians has remained strong."

=== Critic of Vietnam War ===
Williams inspired a generation of historians to re-think the Cold War and was a critic of the Vietnam War. These included Gar Alperovitz, Lloyd Gardner, Patrick J. Hearden, Gabriel Kolko, Walter LaFeber, and Thomas J. McCormick, who, along with Williams, argued that the Vietnam War was neither democratizing nor liberating, but was an attempt to spread American dominance. He later edited a book of readings together with Gardner, LaFeber, and McCormick (who had taken his place at UW–Madison when Williams left to teach in Oregon) called America in Vietnam: A Documentary History in 1989.

During the 1960s, Williams' work became very popular among the New Left and Williams has been called "the favorite historian of the Middle American New Left". However, the Wisconsin School and the New Left were distinct, with the latter more radical in outlook. Indeed, Williams left the University of Wisconsin in the late 1960s in part because he disliked the militant direction that student protests were taking there.

=== Oregon years ===
Also tiring of the grind of teaching graduate students, Williams moved to Oregon in 1968 to, in the words of his biographer, Paul Buhle, "teach undergraduates, live by the ocean, and live in a diversified community of 'ordinary' Americans". While teaching at Oregon State University, Williams "called for a return to the Articles of Confederation and a radical decentralization of political and economic power". "Not only did he see the U.S. under the Articles as relatively anti-imperial, he also believed that the strong localism made possible under the Articles was the only form of governance suitable to real Americans living real lives".

Williams served as president of the Organization of American Historians in 1980. He retired from Oregon State University in 1988, and died in Newport, Oregon, in 1990. Always a bit eccentric and not a little idiosyncratic, Williams gave his interpretation of the nation's past a moralistic tone, finding soul mates in conservatives like John Quincy Adams and Herbert Hoover. He always distrusted cosmopolitanism and championed small communities, while distrusting intellectuals who sneered at the unwashed masses. For all his radicalism, he never outgrew the kind of populist approach that he believed was an important part of the American heritage. In this sense he fit in well with his Wisconsin colleagues, William B. Hesseltine and Merrill Jensen, all of whom added to what has been called the "Wisconsin school" of historical interpretation.

== Criticism ==
To some degree, Williams's economic interpretation of American diplomacy has been criticized on the same grounds as Charles A. Beard's larger economic analysis of American history. In 1974, for instance, N. Gordon Levin Jr., compared Williams to Beard and argued that the Open Door model "is inadequate because it insists on forcing all political-moral and strategic motivations" for American foreign policy into "the Procrustean confines" of relentless economic expansion. Williams' response was that he was merely re-stating what American intellectual and political leaders said at the time.

Another serious critique of Williams's work was offered by Robert W. Tucker in 1971, followed by Robert James Maddox and J. A. Thompson in 1973, and by Howard Schonberger in 1975. Tucker's arguments challenged those of Williams by arguing that United States foreign policy had been generally passive, rather than aggressive, before 1939. Tucker's arguments were elaborated and expanded later by other scholars. Maddox in The New Left and the Origins of the Cold War criticized Williams, Lloyd Gardner, and other revisionist scholars for alleged pervasive misuse of historical source documents and for a general lack of objectivity. Williams and the others published detailed rebuttals in the New York Times Book Review in 1973.

In 1986, Arthur Schlesinger Jr., whom Williams always distrusted for his closeness to power brokers, criticized him from a liberal perspective in The Cycles of American History. In the 1950s, Schlesinger had accused Williams of "communist" influence, because of Williams's critique of U.S. policy toward the Soviet Union in American-Russian Relations and the Monthly Review article "Second Look at Mr. X", a response to George F. Kennan's Foreign Affairs article "The Sources of Soviet Conduct", published under the moniker Mr. X in 1947.

More recently, Marc-William Palen and Mary Speck have called into question the application of the Open Door for the American Empire in the late 19th and early 20th centuries, as during this period the United States subscribed to closed door protectionist policies at home and abroad.

Williams' works and overall school of thought is evaluated and critiqued in Andrew J. Bacevich's Journal Article. Bacevich brought into discussion the Vietnam anti-war movement coupled with the emergence of the 'New Left' which surprisingly disappointed Williams, insinuating that the consequences made by the American people were unavoidable issues for the future. Denouncing the applauded historian, Bacevich suggests Williams' "greatness was confined to a specific sphere." Evidently, Bacevich reviews Williams' political conscious and philosophical attributes as less celebrated.

=== Revival ===
Some of Williams' ideas about the imperial nature of American foreign policy have been revived by Andrew Bacevich, who uses them as a starting point for his own critique of U.S. policies since the end of the Cold War in American Empire.

The anniversary of the publication of Tragedy in 2009 occasioned a number of retrospectives and analyses of the longer-term impact of Williams' work, and such reconsideration inevitably identified the enormous impact of his work on the field and drew parallels between Williams' work and the state of U.S. foreign relations in the years after the attacks of September 11, 2001. The second edition of Michael Hogan's edited collection of essays on postwar American foreign policy, now coedited with Frank Costigliola, noted that "Williams' work remains influential well into the twenty-first century".

In 2001, Justus D. Doenecke wrote a review, evaluating Williams' work, implying that the "crux of Williams's foreign policy" is within his thesis that the United States had become engaged in an "economic expansion and the creation of an informal empire." This idea of an 'American Empire' is also talked about in J.A. Thompson's 'William Appleman Williams and the 'American Empire'.' Thompson echoes this school of thought, claiming that Williams' line of argument toward American Foreign Policy "has always been an expansionist, imperialist power."

== Works ==
=== Books ===
- American-Russian Relations, 1781–1947, 1952
- America and the Middle East: Open Door Imperialism or Enlightened Leadership?, 1958
- The Tragedy of American Diplomacy, 1959
- The Contours of American History, 1961
- The United States, Cuba, and Castro: An Essay on the Dynamics of Revolution and the Dissolution of Empire, 1962
- The Great Evasion: An Essay on the Contemporary Relevance of Karl Marx and on the Wisdom of Admitting the Heretic Into the Dialogue About America's Future, 1964
- The Roots of the Modern American Empire: A Study of the Growth and Shaping of Social Consciousness in a Marketplace Society, 1969
- Some Presidents: Wilson to Nixon, 1972
- History as a Way of Learning, 1973
- America Confronts a Revolutionary World: 1776–1976, 1976
- Americans in a Changing World: A History of the United States in the Twentieth Century, 1978
- Empire as a Way of Life: An Essay on the Causes and Character of America's Present Predicament, Along With a Few Thoughts About an Alternative, 1980

=== Selected articles ===
- "The Legend of Isolationism in the 1920s," Science and Society, vol. 18, no. 1 (Winter 1954), pp. 1–20. In JSTOR.
