= Fred Harvey Harrington =

17th president of the University of Wisconsin–Madison
- In office October 20, 1962 – May 8, 1970
- Preceded by: Conrad Elvehjem
- Succeeded by: Robben Wright Fleming

Personal details
- Born: June 24, 1912 Watertown, New York, United States
- Died: April 8, 1995 (aged 82) Madison, Wisconsin, United States
- Spouse: Nancy Elizabeth Howes (m. 1935–1994)
- Children: 5

Academic work
- Era: 1865-1900
- Discipline: History
- Sub-discipline: American
- Institutions: New York University; University of Wisconsin-Madison; University of Arkansas; West Virginia University
- Doctoral students: William Appleman Williams; Carl Parrini; Walter LaFeber
- Main interests: American diplomatic history
- Education: Cornell University; New York University
- Profession: College administrator Academic

Fred Harvey Harrington (June 24, 1912 – April 8, 1995) was an American educator and the 17th president of the University of Wisconsin-Madison from 1962 to 1970.

== Career ==
Born in Watertown, Harrington received his Bachelor of Arts from Cornell University (1933), and his Master of Arts (1934) and Doctor of Philosophy (1937), both from New York University, where he also taught as an instructor during the 1936-1937 academic year. Upon graduating, he immediately took the post of assistant professor of history at the University of Wisconsin-Madison. In 1940, Harrington moved to the University of Arkansas as a full professor of history and political science, and had a brief spell as a visiting professor at West Virginia University in 1942. He earned a Guggenheim Fellowship from 1943 to 1944. Harrington returned to Madison in 1947, and also chaired the history department from 1952 to 1955.

Harrington held administrative posts at the University of Wisconsin-Madison as assistant to the president (1957), vice president of academic affairs (1958) and vice president of the university (1962). From 1962 until 1970, he was president. He was a Ford Foundation advisor in India from 1971 to 1977, and then returned to the university to continue teaching. Harrington retired in 1982 and died of a stroke in Madison in 1995.

In 2015, an endowed professorship was named after Harrington called the Fred Harvey Harrington Professor of History at the University of Wisconsin-Madison. Alfred W. McCoy was given this chair.

The award for the University of Wisconsin-Madison's best undergraduate thesis in history is known as the Fred Harvey Harrington Prize.

== Books ==
- The Anti-Imperialist Movement in the United States, 1898-1900, 1935, OCLC 4623042
- Nathaniel Prentiss Banks; A Study in Anti-slavery Politics, 1936, OCLC 7318205
- God, Mammon and the Japanese : Dr. Horace N. Allen and Korean-American relations, 1884-1905, 1944, OCLC 6970878
- Fighting Politician, Major General N. P. Banks, 1948, ISBN 978-1-5128-0261-0, OCLC 1255224328
- Hanging Judge, 1951, OCLC 411854
- A History of American Civilization, contributing author, 1953, OCLC 1256260869
- Rand McNally Atlas of World History, contributing author, 1968, OCLC 192000803
- The Future of Adult Education: New Responsibilities of Colleges and Universities, 1977, ISBN 978-0-87589-301-3, OCLC 1132456451

== Awards ==
- 1986 - Association Indians in America Honor Award

== See also ==
- List of Guggenheim Fellowships awarded in 1943
- List of presidents and chancellors of the University of Wisconsin–Madison
