= Thomas J. McCormick =

American historian

Thomas J. McCormick (March 6, 1933 – July 25, 2020) was an American academic who was emeritus professor of history at the University of Wisconsin–Madison, the same place he got a Ph. D. where he succeeded William Appleman Williams and continued the groundbreaking work of the so-called Wisconsin School of diplomatic history. Indeed he is considered one of the core members of the Wisconsin School, along with Williams, Walter LaFeber, and Lloyd Gardner. He has used Immanuel Wallerstein's world-systems approach to describe the dynamics of hegemony in US diplomatic history and also studied US corporatism.

McCormick taught at the Ohio University, University of Pittsburgh, and University of Wisconsin–Madison where he won the Wisconsin Student Association Award for Teaching Excellence (1992-1993). He was a Woodrow Wilson Center Fellow (1981), Distinguished Fulbright Lecturer at University College Dublin (1993-1994), and Vilas Associate (1996-1998). McCormick authored six books (see Works) and many influential articles. He often gave US guest lectures as well as several keynote addresses at worldwide conferences.

On December 4, 2023, the University of Wisconsin–Madison Senate Faculty passed a memorial resolution honoring the career and life of Professor Thomas J. McCormick.

== Works ==
- China Market: America's Quest for Informal Empire, 1893-1901. Chicago, IL: Quadrangle Books, 1967.
- Creation of the American Empire: U.S. Diplomatic History. With Lloyd C. Gardner and Walter F. LaFeber. New York: Rand McNally & Co., 1973.
- America in Vietnam. With William A. Williams and Walter F. LaFeber. New York: Anchor Doubleday, 1988.
- America's Half-Century: United States Foreign Policy in the Cold War. Baltimore, MD: Johns Hopkins University Press, 1990, revised second edition 1995.
- The Vietnam War: Four American Perspectives. With William Westmorland, George McGovern, and Edward Luttwack. Lafayette, IN: Purdue University Press, 1990.
- Behind the Throne: Servants of Power to Imperial Presidents, 1898-1968. With Walter F. LaFeber (eds.) Madison, WI: University of Wisconsin Press, 1994.
