= Patrick J. Hearden =

American historian (born 1942)

Patrick J. Hearden (born September 17, 1942) is an American historian who is the professor of history at Purdue University, West Lafayette, Indiana. He specializes in the history of American foreign policy. He received a Ph.D. degree from the University of Wisconsin–Madison in 1971

== Published works ==
- Wealth, Power and Inequality in World History Vol. II with James R Farr, Cognella Academic Publishing, 2021
- Wealth, Power and Inequality in World History Vol. I with James R Farr, Cognella Academic Publishing, 2021
- Architects of Globalism: Building a New World Order During World War II, Fayetteville: The University of Arkansas Press, 2002.
- The Tragedy of Vietnam, New York: Pearson Longman, 1991.
- Roosevelt Confronts Hitler: America’s Entry into World War II, DeKalb: Northern Illinois University Press, 1987.
- Independence and Empire: The New South’s Cotton Mill Campaign, 1865-1901, DeKalb: Northern Illinois University Press, 1982.
