= Lloyd Gardner =

American historian (born 1934)

Lloyd C. Gardner (born 1934) is an American historian, a member of the "Wisconsin School" of diplomatic history along with Walter LaFeber and Thomas J. McCormick. He was educated at the University of Wisconsin–Madison.

Gardner was the Charles and Mary Beard Professor of History at Rutgers University, where he taught since 1963. A specialist in 20th century History of U.S. foreign policy, Gardner has held several national fellowships, including two Fulbright Professorships in England and Finland, and a Guggenheim Fellowship. He is author or editor of 16 books on American foreign policy.

The Lloyd C. Gardner Fellowship Program in Leadership and Social Policy at Rutgers was established in his honor.

== Bibliography ==
- Lloyd C. Gardner, Economic Aspects of New Deal Diplomacy, Madison: University of Wisconsin Press, 1964; paperback, Boston: Beacon Press, 1971.
- Lloyd C. Gardner, Architects of Illusion: Men and Ideas in American Foreign Policy, 1941–1949, Chicago: Quadrangle Books, 1970.
- Lloyd C. Gardner, Imperial America: American Foreign Policy Since 1898, New York: Harcourt Brace Jovanovich Inc., 1976
- Lloyd C. Gardner, A Covenant With Power: America and the World From Wilson to Reagan, London: Macmillan, 1984.
- Lloyd C. Gardner, America in Vietnam: A Documentary History, with William A. Williams et al. Garden City, NY: Anchor Press/Doubleday, 1985.
- Lloyd C. Gardner, Approaching Vietnam: From World War II through Dienbienphu, 1941–1954, New York: W.W. Norton & Co., 1988.
- Lloyd C. Gardner, Spheres of Influence: The Great Powers Partition Europe from Munich to Yalta, Chicago: Ivan R. Dee, 1993.
- Lloyd C. Gardner, Pay Any Price: Lyndon Johnson and the Wars for Vietnam, Chicago: Ivan R. Dee, 1995.
- Lloyd C. Gardner and Ted Gittinger, eds., Vietnam: The Early Decisions, Austin: University of Texas Press, 1997.
- Lloyd C. Gardner and Ted Gittinger, eds., International Perspectives on Vietnam, College Station, TX: Texas A&M University of Press, 2000.
- Andreas W. Daum, Lloyd C. Gardner and Wilfried Mausbach, eds., America, the Vietnam War and the World: Comparative and International Perspectives, Cambridge, UK: Cambridge University Press, 2003.
- Lloyd Gardner and Marilyn B. Young, eds., The New Empire: A 21st-Century Teach-In on U.S. Foreign Policy, New York: The New Press, 2003.
- Lloyd C. Gardner, The Case That Never Dies: The Lindbergh Kidnapping, Rutgers University Press, 2004.
- Lloyd C. Gardner and Marilyn B. Young, eds., Iraq and the Lessons of Vietnam: Or, How Not to Learn From the Past, New York: The New Press, 2007.
- Lloyd C. Gardner, The Long Road to Baghdad: A History of U.S. Foreign Policy From the 1970s to the Present, New York: The New Press, 2008.
- Lloyd C. Gardner, Three Kings: The Rise of an American Empire in the Middle East After World War II, New York: The New Press, 2009.
- Lloyd C. Gardner, The Road to Tahrir Square: Egypt and the United States from the Rise of Nasser to the Fall of Mubarak, New York: The New Press, 2011.
- Lloyd C. Gardner, The Killing Machine: The American Presidency in the Age of Drone Warfare, New York: The New Press, 2013.
