= Walter LaFeber =

American historian (1933–2021)

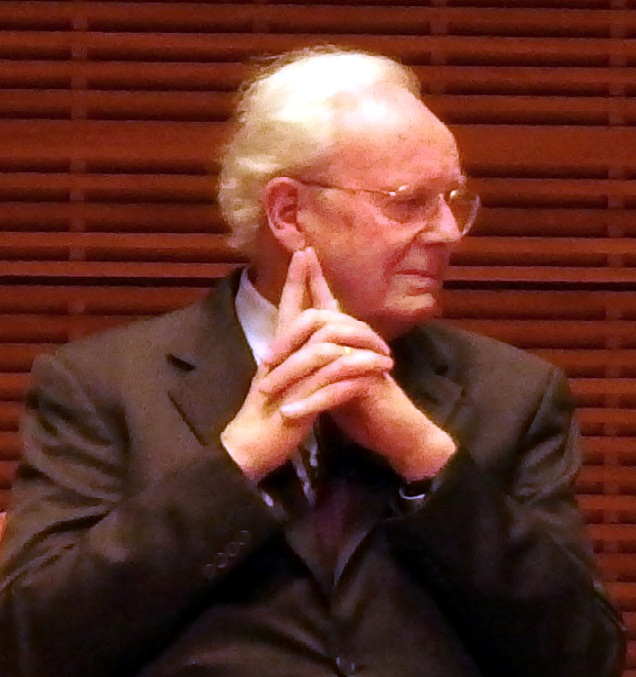
- LaFeber in 2016
- Born: August 30, 1933; Walkerton, Indiana, U.S.
- Died: March 9, 2021 (aged 87); Ithaca, New York, U.S.
- Occupation: Professor of History
- Spouse: Sandra Gould
- Children: 2
- Awards: Beveridge Award; Bancroft Prize; Ellis W. Hawley Prize; Gustavus Myers Outstanding Book Award; Clark Distinguished Teaching Award

Academic background
- Education: Hanover College (BA); Stanford University (MA); University of Wisconsin (PhD)
- Thesis: The Latin American Policy of the Second Cleveland Administration (1959)
- Doctoral advisor: Fred Harvey Harrington

Academic work
- Era: 1950s–2000s
- Discipline: Historian
- Sub-discipline: American Foreign Policy
- Institutions: Cornell University
- Notable students: Thomas Downey; Stephen Hadley; Eric Alterman; Andrew Tisch; Sandy Berger; Derek Chollet; and more
- Notable works: The New Empire: An Interpretation of American Expansion, 1860–1898; America, Russia and the Cold War, 1945–2006; The Panama Canal: The Crisis in Historical Perspective; The Clash: U.S.-Japanese Relations Throughout History
- Notable ideas: Economics- and markets-based interpretations Effect of revolutions abroad on American decisions Effect of individuals on American policy

Walter Fredrick LaFeber (August 30, 1933 – March 9, 2021) was an American academic who served as the Andrew H. and James S. Tisch Distinguished University Professor in the Department of History at Cornell University. Previous to that he served as the Marie Underhill Noll Professor of History and a Stephen H. Weiss Presidential Fellow at Cornell.

LaFeber was one of the United States' most distinguished scholars of the history of U.S. foreign policy, and a leading member of the "Wisconsin School" of American diplomatic history. He was known for providing widely read revisionist histories of the Cold War with views like William Appleman Williams but more subtle; the label "moderate revisionist" has been applied to him.

LaFeber's teaching abilities led to his longstanding undergraduate "History of American Foreign Relations" class at Cornell gaining a reputation as one of the university's best and most popular courses. A number of his students went on to prominent positions in the U.S. government and academia. In 2006 LaFeber gave a farewell lecture before nearly 3,000 colleagues and former students at the Beacon Theatre in New York City.

== Early life and education ==
LaFeber was born in Walkerton, Indiana, a town of around 2,000 people in the northern part of the state, outside South Bend, on August 30, 1933. His father, Ralph Nichols LaFeber, owned a local grocery store; his mother, Helen (Liedecker), was a housewife. LaFeber worked at his father's store from age eight through the end of college. He became a lifelong fan of the Chicago Cubs.

At Walkerton High School, the 6-foot-2-inch (1.88 m) LaFeber was a star basketball player. In one game during his senior year for the Indians, he scored 35 points, approaching the single-game record for most points scored in the South Bend sectional of the Indiana High School Boys Basketball Tournament. He graduated high school in 1951.

LaFeber attended Hanover College, a small Presbyterian liberal arts college in the southern part of Indiana. LaFeber played varsity basketball for the Hanover Panthers, as a reserve forward during his sophomore year. He also played some during his junior year. He sang in the Hanover College Choir, which provided voices for Sunday morning Presbyterian services and also gave concerts around the state, was co-chair of a "Religion in Life" Week program at the college, and was on the Hanover Board of Student Affairs, which directed extracurricular affairs on campus. He belonged to the Beta Theta Pi social fraternity, the Alpha Phi Gamma national honor society for journalism, and Hanover's own Gamma Sigma Pi honor society for academic performance. He received his BA from there in 1955.

LaFeber met Sandra Gould while at Hanover. They married in 1955 and the couple had two children.

He then went to Stanford University, gaining an MA in 1956. There, he studied under Thomas A. Bailey, and would be influenced by Bailey's lively writing style. Contrary to some later accounts, LaFeber has said he got along well with Bailey. At the time LaFeber was not dissatisfied with U.S. foreign policy, having supported the presidential candidacies of Robert A. Taft in 1952 and Dwight D. Eisenhower in 1956.

At this point LaFeber went to the University of Wisconsin. In doing so he followed the advice of one of his college professors and declined an offer from Harvard University, taking advantage of what he later said was "the best professional advice I have ever received." The study of history at Wisconsin had a heritage going back to the time of Frederick Jackson Turner, and the intellectual atmosphere at the school encouraged people to think differently. At Wisconsin, LaFeber, and several future colleagues and co-authors, initially studied with Fred Harvey Harrington. In an era when the realistic theory of international relations predominated, LaFeber was influenced by Harrington's inductive methodology in seminar teaching, sense of irony, and suggestions that the economic interpretations of Charles A. Beard, whose work by then had largely fallen out of favor, should perhaps not be so overlooked. After Harrington moved into university administration, he replaced himself with William Appleman Williams, for whom LaFeber and fellow students Lloyd C. Gardner and Thomas J. McCormick became teaching assistants and with whom they would strike up a close bond (the four of them would become the core of what became known as the Wisconsin School of diplomatic history).

LaFeber was also influenced at Wisconsin by Philip D. Curtin, who developed LaFeber's interest in the British Empire, as well as by the early American scholar Merrill Jensen and the intellectual historian Merle Curti. During his dissertation research at the Library of Congress, LaFeber found himself at the same table as historian Ernest R. May of Harvard, with both working on the same period but with very different interpretations of it. The more established May helpfully supplied LaFeber with documents he had found, which LaFeber took as an object lesson on how two fair-minded scholars can reach differing conclusions from the same sources. With his dissertation titled "The Latin American Policy of the Second Cleveland Administration" being accepted, LaFeber received his PhD from Wisconsin in 1959.

== Scholarship ==
Cornell University hired LaFeber as an assistant professor in 1959. He became an associate professor in 1963. LaFeber found an engaging environment with a number of other up-and-coming figures in the history and government departments, including Allan Bloom, Theodore J. Lowi, and Joel H. Silbey among others.

LaFeber's The New Empire: An Interpretation of American Expansion, 1860–1898, published in 1963, was a greatly expanded revision of his dissertation. It received the Beveridge Award of the American Historical Association; in fact the award was given based on the book having been read in manuscript form before publication. The work established LaFeber as a prominent scholar, and has remained a popular choice in academic circles for several decades.

Historian Irwin Unger, writing in 1967, did not find much to like of Williams or the Wisconsin School overall, but did praise LaFeber as the best of them, a "sophisticated and urbane historian" who was "not a crude polemicist". Unger found it particularly notable that LaFeber did not vilify the people he identified as being behind much of American foreign policy. Indeed, in the preface to The New Empire, LaFeber writes:

Finally, I must add that I have been profoundly impressed with the statesmen of these decades. ... I found both the policy makers and the businessmen of this era to be responsible, conscientious men who accepted the economic and social realities of their day, understood domestic and foreign problems, debated issues vigorously, and especially were unafraid to strike out on new and uncharted paths in order to create what they sincerely hoped would be a better nation and a better world. All this, however, is not to deny that the decisions of these men resulted in many unfortunate consequences for their twentieth-century descendants.

LaFeber's publication did meet with some criticism. One later accounting of the Wisconsin School notes that in The New Empire, "LaFeber's arguments were sometimes questionable or overdrawn, and he acknowledged that he had passed by episodes that did not fit his pattern."

LaFeber's next work, America, Russia and the Cold War, 1945-1966 (1967), would end up going through ten editions (the last, America, Russia, and the Cold War, 1945-2006, in 2006), a rarity for a book that is not explicitly a textbook. The book emerged after the initial wave of Cold War revisionist theories had already been published and debated. Eliot Fremont-Smith of The New York Times described it as part of a succeeding wave of books that tried to refine those insights in a firmer historical grounding. Fremont-Smith praised LaFeber's work for being a "penetrating account" that was especially strong in sorting out the chronology of events and tracing the impact of domestic politics in each of the countries involved.

The relationship between the scholarship of LaFeber and William Appleman Williams has been characterized by one later historiographic survey this way: "Williams' best-known student, who has surpassed the master in the quantity and quality of his historical output while continuing to promote the line of interpretation laid down by Williams, is Walter LaFeber." However, not all have agreed; a broadside against Cold War revisionists was published by historian Robert H. Ferrell in 2006, who criticized their reliance on a monocausal theory. In particular he charged LaFeber with overusing the papers of Bernard Baruch, whom Ferrell said lacked real influence in determining American foreign policy.

LaFeber's later scholarly works received praise within academic and other circles. His 1978 work, The Panama Canal: The Crisis in Historical Perspective, has been attributed with influence over elite opinion regarding the history of Panama–United States relations and with helping the United States Senate decide to ratify the Panama Canal Treaty. A revised edition in 1990 was critical of U.S. policy since then. In the wake of the United States invasion of Panama in 1989, LaFeber appeared on television frequently as an expert, and in an interview at the time, said the invasion was "an admission of failure to work out a diplomatic solution to get rid of a third-rate dictator that we had created." Inevitable Revolutions: The United States in Central America (1984, revised 1992) received the Gustavus Myers Outstanding Book Award; in it, LaFeber formulates a variant of dependency theory, called neo-dependency theory, that examines corporate interests as part of explaining the relationships between the countries involved, but still looks at the role of U.S. government policy and other factors as well.

The American Age: United States Foreign Policy at Home and Abroad Since 1750 (1989, revised 1994) encompasses some of what was in LaFeber's famous course. In The Clash: U.S.-Japanese Relations Throughout History (1997), LaFeber turned toward East Asia, surveying the breadth of the American engagement and conflict with Japan from the nineteenth century through the 1990s. While a New York Times review called it a "dense chronological account...not for the fainthearted," The Clash received both the prestigious Bancroft Prize in American History and the Ellis W. Hawley Prize of the Organization of American Historians. LaFeber then shifted focus and returned to his youthful interest in basketball, examining the effect of modern sports and communication empires in his book, Michael Jordan and the New Global Capitalism (1999, revised 2002), which analyzes the rise in popularity of basketball, Michael Jordan, Nike, and cable satellite networks and their relation to, and metaphor for, globalization.

Overall, LaFeber's career has been characterized as having "imbibed the Wisconsin lessons of empiricism, criticism, and a suspicion of power."

== Teaching ==
LaFeber became the first recipient of the Clark Distinguished Teaching Award at Cornell in 1966; the award was created to honor junior faculty members who were involved in the teaching of undergraduates.

He attained the rank of full professor in 1967, then was named to the Marie Underhill Noll Professor of History chair in 1968. By 1969, The New York Times was characterizing LaFeber as "one of most respected members of the faculty" at Cornell.

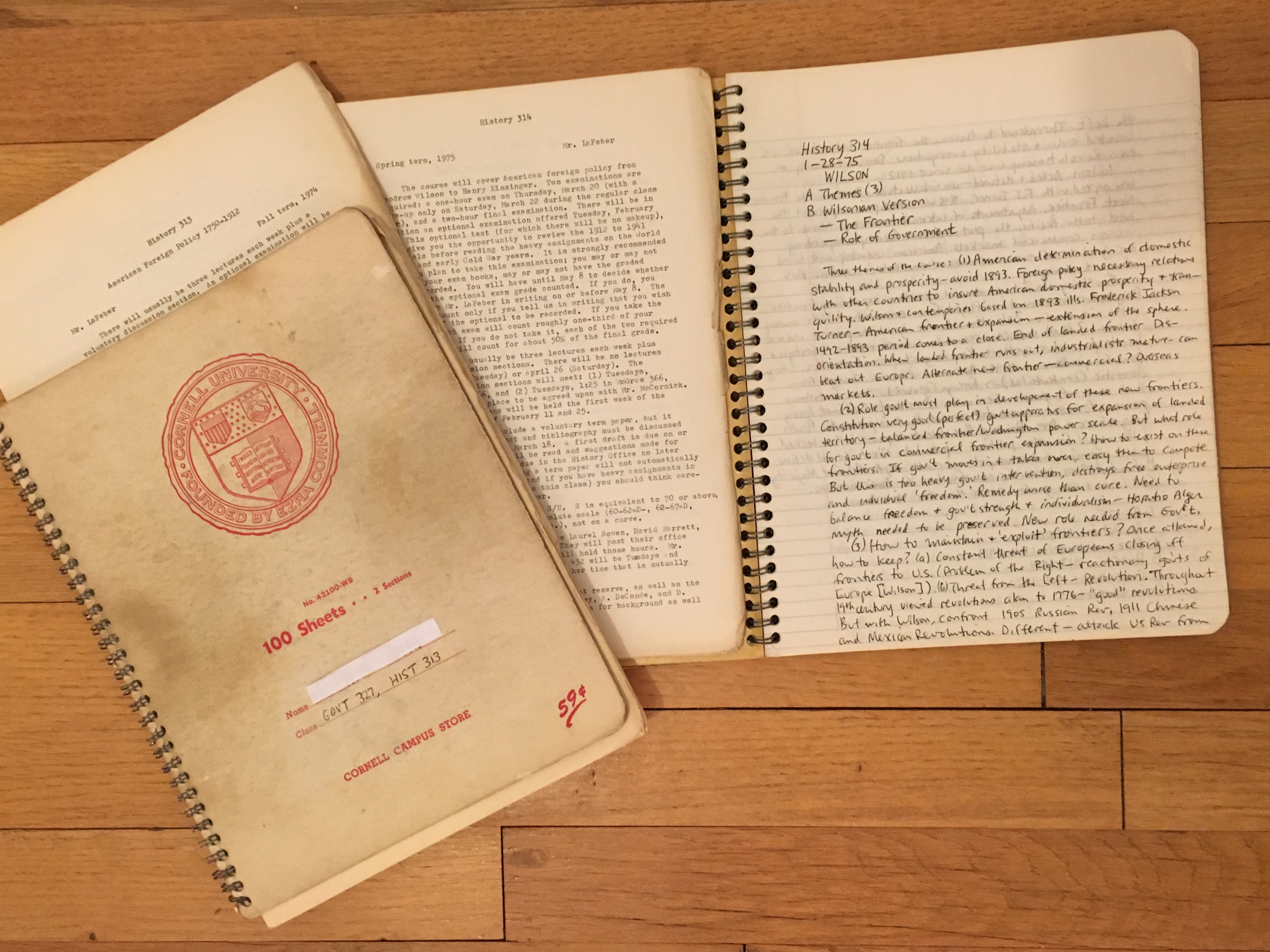
A student's notebooks from History 313 and 314, LaFeber's History of American Foreign Relations course as taught during 1974–75. Students took diligent notes during the lectures and often kept the notebooks for decades after. The History 314 page shown is for the first lecture of the semester and shows LaFeber's brief outline at the start.

LaFeber's undergraduate History of American Foreign Relations class achieved a reputation as one of the toughest and most popular courses on campus. This was especially so during the turbulent times of the Vietnam War, when students were seeking answers for why their country was involved in that conflict and in other foreign interventions. LaFeber's lectures were considered "events"; classes met Tuesdays, Thursdays, and Saturdays, with the last of these being in front of even more people than the weekday ones, because students brought their friends to listen. Even students who never took the course or went to a lecture were aware of its existence and renown.

LaFeber, who was known for being "old school" in his appearance and demeanor, always wearing a coat and tie to class, was lauded by Cornell's in-house newspaper for his simplistic approach to presentation, with a style that has been characterized as "anti-razzle-dazzle". He began classes by writing an outline of only a few points on the chalkboard and then talking without notes (lecturing from memory was a technique his mentor Harrington had used). At its peak, the course attracted more than 400 students and lectures were sometimes held in the large Bailey Hall to accommodate them. He spoke softly for whatever room he was in, so as to force students to be absolutely quiet in order to hear him. While other revisionists focused more on ideological or institutional forces, LaFeber made his scholarship and his lectures memorable by stressing the role of individuals, from his narrative hero John Quincy Adams to a few Cornell-related figures such as Willard Straight. Throughout his career LaFeber was concerned with teaching students critical thinking skills in historical analysis rather than gaining converts to his viewpoint, and accordingly even those who did not always agree with the markets-oriented interpretations advanced in his lectures still found them compelling. LaFeber's classes typically ended to pronounced ovations.

In 2013, the American Historical Association would write of this course that, despite his publishing achievements, "LaFeber might be even more distinguished as a teacher: one for whom the overworked adjective 'legendary' is entirely fitting. Without eyewitnesses, would we trust accounts that his upper-division lecture course regularly drew 300-plus students each Tuesday, Thursday, and Saturday? ... Or that he continued running discussion sections and grading papers for that huge class when he could have easily avoided it?"

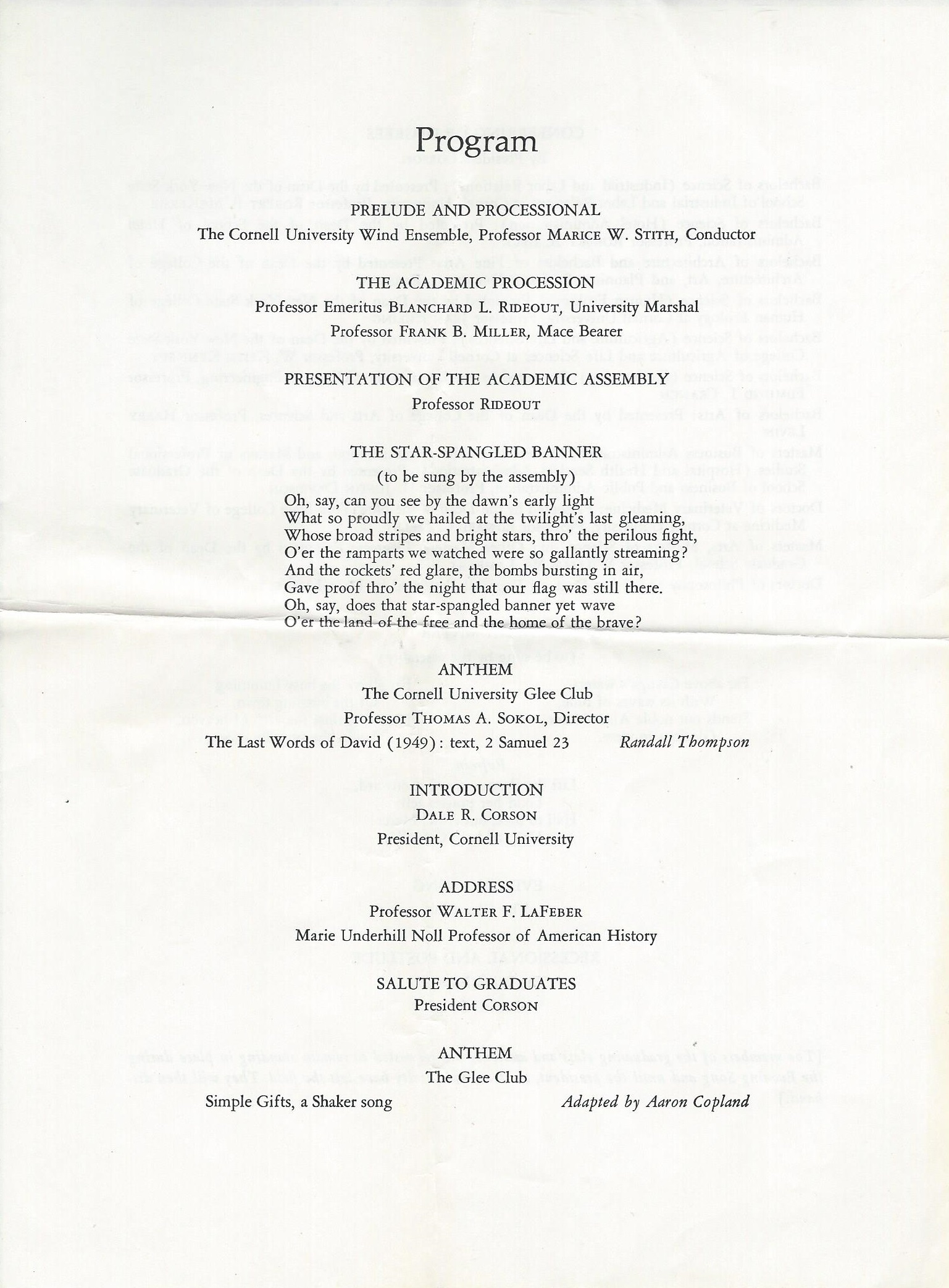
May 1976 program in which LaFeber became the first faculty member ever to deliver Cornell's commencement address

In May 1976, during the year of the United States Bicentennial, Cornell University broke with an over-100-year-old tradition: Instead of the university president or another administrator delivering the commencement address, LaFeber became the first faculty member to give it. Cornell president Dale R. Corson later explained the reason: "It was the bicentennial. I felt that something significant should be said by someone who could say it with authority." In his address at Schoellkopf Field, LaFeber highlighted the similarities of Cornell founders Ezra Cornell and Andrew Dickson White to the founders of the nation, saying they shared a common passion in the belief of the power of ideas, but stressed that Cornell and White were part of the expanding of human rights to groups the founders had excluded, thus leading the university to take on the role of "midwife when revolutionary ideas enter an un-revolutionary society."

LaFeber switched to half-time teaching in 1989, giving classes in the fall but reserving the spring for researching and writing. He began doing less than that in the 1990s, but then was offered the Andrew H. and James S. Tisch Distinguished University Professor post, which brought him back to teaching. The Tisch position is considered Cornell's highest faculty distinction.

In another prominent occasion, Cornell president Hunter Rawlings chose LaFeber to give a commemoration address on the Arts Quadrangle following the September 11, 2001 attacks.

His colleague at Cornell, professor and administrator Glenn Altschuler, praised LaFeber's overall contribution to the university, saying "He is Midwestern mensch - the best thing that's happened to Cornell in the last half century." Another colleague, Mary Beth Norton, has said that "No other member of the department has commanded the same respect as Walt in the 35 years I have known him."

The devotion of past students towards LaFeber and his course has often been noted; many, regardless of what occupation they went into, have used the word "awe" to describe their recollection of his lectures. Historian and former student Richard H. Immerman has been quoted as saying, "Those of us who took that course enjoyed a learning experience that we can probably never adequately describe or praise. In a number of specific instances, like my own, it changed lives." Other future academics have said much the same, including Andrew J. Rotter, and a number of female students inspired by LaFeber later attained success, including Nancy F. Cott, Susan A. Brewer, Lorena Oropeza, and others.

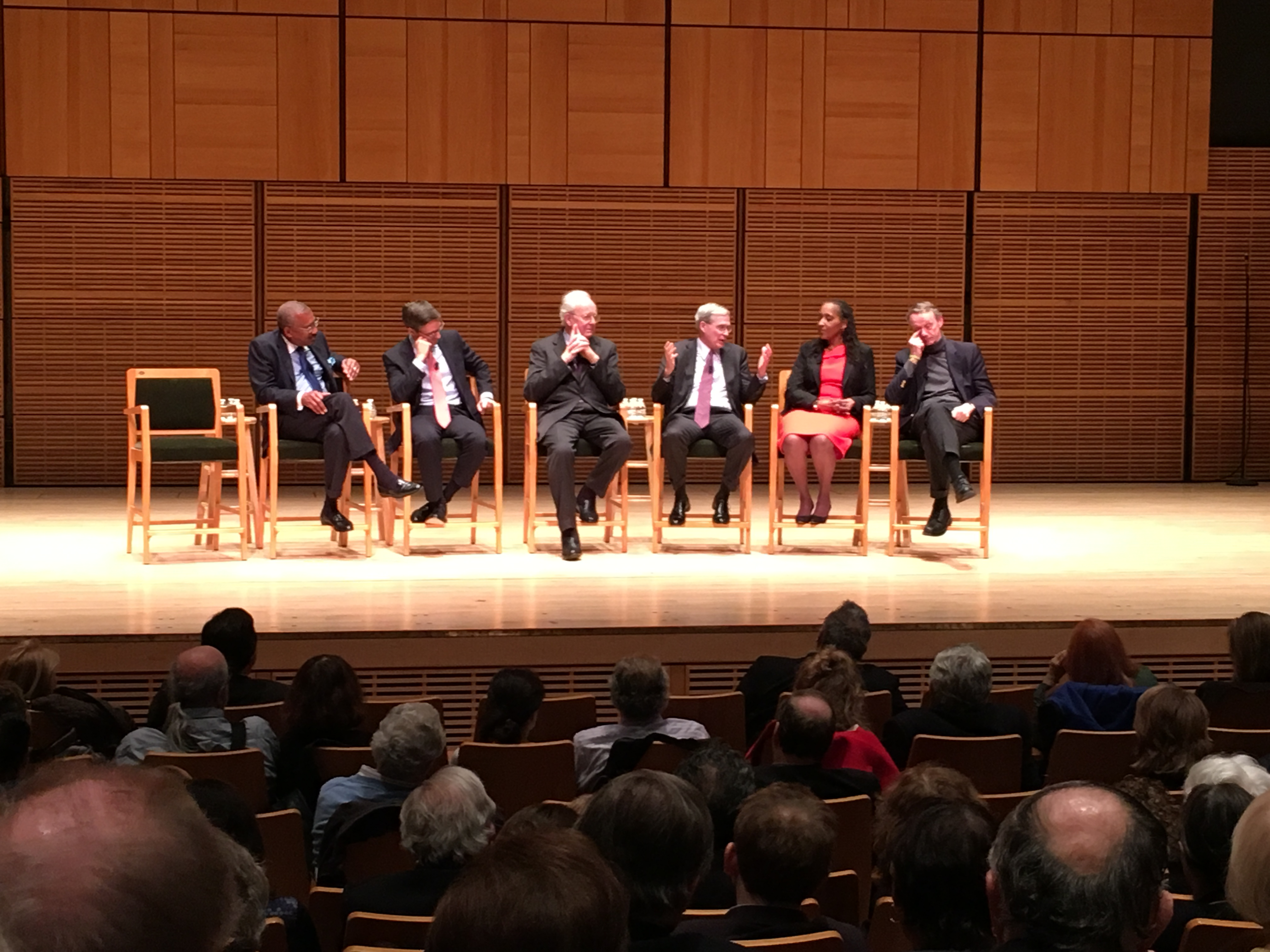
LaFeber (third from left) at a 2016 panel session discussing the influence of Cornell University on American foreign policy; Dwight Bush, Derek Chollet and Stephen Hadley are also present

Prominent former students of LaFeber in areas outside academia have included: U.S. Representative Thomas Downey, U.S. National Security Advisor Stephen Hadley, and Undersecretary of Defense and U.S. Ambassador Eric S. Edelman; media critic Eric Alterman, businessman Andrew Tisch, Assistant Secretary of State Daniel Fried, Ambassador and Assistant Secretary of State William Brownfield, and U.S. National Security Advisor Sandy Berger; Ambassador Dwight L. Bush Sr. and Assistant Secretary of Defense for International Security Affairs Derek Chollet; and Jeffrey P. Bialos, Deputy Under Secretary of Defense for Industrial Affairs.

LaFeber's influential students were found working for both parties in Washington and had a diversity of viewpoints. Especially noticeable in this regard were Hadley and other members of "The Vulcans", an informal name for George W. Bush's foreign policy advisory team, who gained their passion for foreign affairs from LaFeber. Indeed, LaFeber has said, "I didn't try to instill anything in anybody. I've never cared about having disciples. [Another professor] did, but he was very convinced he was right. I'm often not." To LaFeber, the most important thing was not necessarily the conclusions one drew from history, but the importance of studying it. Alterman has said, "To me, Walter represents the ur-notion of what it means to be a disinterested scholar. There's a willingness to follow the scholarship wherever it leads, even if it's in politically inconvenient directions." Nonetheless, LaFeber has sometimes stated his views quite publicly, especially his prediction that the 2003 invasion of Iraq would end up poorly, saying that the Bush Administration's foreign policy belief that an invasion would help democracy spread throughout the Middle East "flies in the face of everything we know about Iraqi history."

== Academic positions and honors ==
By early 1966 LaFeber was publicly critical of U.S. strategy in the Vietnam War, saying that the country's policy reflected "the dilemma of American liberalism" with policy objectives that were contradictory and paradoxical. In general, LaFeber was in sympathy with many of the student causes of the 1960s, including opposition to the war, the quest for racial justice, and the desire for a political system that better represented democratic ideals. He later said that "academic freedom means the freedom, indeed means the requirement (otherwise what is tenure for?) to criticize American society when evidence accumulates that society has gone off in the wrong direction."

But the occupation of Willard Straight Hall by African American students, who eventually became armed, as well as some other physical and verbal threats made against university officials and faculty at the time, greatly dismayed him. Many of the younger and more progressive faculty members on campus supported the actions of the campus Afro-American Society and considered that traditional notions of academic freedom were secondary to larger questions of human rights and that a university's greatest responsibility was to eradicate racial and other injustices. But LaFeber was one of only a few liberal professors who strongly disagreed with that stance. To LaFeber, academic freedom was paramount; decades later, he reiterated his view:

... what a university is all about is rational discourse. What these people were doing was essentially raping the major principle of the university. Once you introduce any kind of element of force into the university, you compromise the institution. To me, that is totally unforgivable. ... We have to make a distinction between procedure and politics. What I am talking about is procedure. I'm a relativist in terms of object and conclusion. I don't think I am necessarily right. What I am absolutist about is the procedure you use to get there. Which means the university always has to be open and it cannot be compromised."

Following the actions on campus, in which the university president, James Alfred Perkins, agreed to some of the students' demands as they departed the Straight, LaFeber resigned his position as chair of the history department. On a trip to New York City with a few other professors to meet with university trustees, LaFeber marshalled the arguments against the actions of Perkins. LaFeber publicly announced that he would not return to Cornell if Perkins remained. LaFeber's stance was one of the more influential in leading to Perkins' resignation at the end of the semester.

In 1971, LaFeber was named to the American Historical Association's seat on the Department of State Historical Advisory Committee, as part of an effort to give revisionist historians a voice during the selection and production of the important Foreign Relations of the United States book series. LaFeber became chair of that committee by 1974, and served on it until 1975.

He was selected as a Guggenheim Fellow in 1989. He gave titled lectures at many universities, and made a number of appearances on radio and television. He also served on several scholarly editorial boards, including that of Political Science Quarterly.

LaFeber was elected to the American Academy of Arts and Sciences. LaFeber served as president in 1999 of the Society for Historians of American Foreign Relations.

LaFeber's career as a scholar, teacher, and public figure was celebrated with a Festschrift-like issue in the journal Diplomatic History in 2004. The editor-in-chief of the journal wrote in an introductory note that "Professor LaFeber has been a commanding presence in the field of the history of American foreign relations for more than four decades."

== Later life ==
Program for LaFeber's 2006 farewell lecture at the Beacon Theatre in New York

LaFeber retired in 2006 after 46 years on the Cornell faculty. His farewell lecture on April 25, 2006, billed as "A Special Evening With Cornell's Walter LaFeber: A Half-Century of Friends, Foreign Policy, and Great Losers" was given to a nearly 3,000-person, capacity gathering of former students, Cornell alumni, and colleagues at the Beacon Theatre in New York City. (The event had been moved from the originally scheduled American Museum of Natural History venue due to overwhelming demand for tickets.) The lecture, which was centered in part around the origins and implications of Wilsonianism, was in his style delivered without notes and once again met with a standing ovation. Hunter Rawlings, the president of Cornell, noted that the event evinced an "intellectual passion, a group catharsis of the first order," not by any manifestation of popular culture or the information age, but by nothing more than "a lecture on diplomatic history".

In 2013, LaFeber was given an American Historical Association's 2013 Award for Scholarly Distinction, a lifetime achievement award for what the association said was for being "one of the scholars who re-invented the study of American foreign relations in the 1960s: not only transforming many specific debates, but lastingly changing our sense of what this field could be. ... An exceptionally visible and valuable public intellectual, Professor LaFeber has managed to reach broad audiences without sacrificing academic rigor."

The influence of LaFeber was again a topic in 2016 at Zankel Hall in New York City, when he and several prominent students discussed the influence of Cornell on American diplomacy.

LaFeber died on March 9, 2021, at an assisted living facility in Ithaca, New York. He was 87.

Later that month, Cornell created the Walter F. LaFeber Professor seat, based on a gift from Andrew H. Tisch (who had audited LaFeber's course as an undergraduate in 1970–71). Thomas B. Pepinsky was named the inaugural holder of the professorship.

== Works ==
Books

- The New Empire: An Interpretation of American Expansion, 1860–1898 (Cornell University Press, 1963; 35th anniv. ed., 1998) ISBN 9780801485954
- John Quincy Adams and American Continental Empire: Letters, Papers and Speeches (Quadrangle Books, 1965) [editor] ISBN 9780812960259
- America, Russia and the Cold War, 1945–1966 (John Wiley & Sons, 1967; succ. eds. longer timespan, concluding 10th ed. 1945–2006, McGraw-Hill, 2006) ISBN 9780471511311
- America in the Cold War: Twenty Years of Revolution and Response, 1947–1967 (John Wiley & Sons, 1967) [editor] ISBN 9780471511328
- The Origins of the Cold War, 1941–1947 (John Wiley & Sons, 1971) [editor] ISBN 9780471511403
- Creation of the American Empire: U.S. Diplomatic History (Rand McNally, 1973; rev. ed. 1976, also available in two volumes) [co-author with Lloyd C. Gardner and Thomas J. McCormick] ISBN 9780528663468
- The American Century: A History of the United States Since the 1890s (John Wiley & Sons, 1975; succ. eds., concluding 7th ed. M. E. Sharpe, 2013, also available in two volumes) [co-author with Richard Polenberg, later editions add co-author Nancy Woloch) ISBN 9780765634849
- America in Vietnam: A Documentary History (Doubleday, 1985) [co-editor with William Appleman Williams, Thomas McCormick, and Lloyd Gardner] ISBN 9780385197526
- The Panama Canal: The Crisis in Historical Perspective (Oxford University Press, 1978; upd. ed., 1990) ISBN 9780195059304
- Inevitable Revolutions: The United States in Central America (W. W. Norton & Co., 1983; 2nd. ed., 1993) ISBN 9780393309645
- The American Age: United States Foreign Policy at Home and Abroad since 1750 (W. W. Norton & Co., 1989; 2nd ed. 1994, also available in two volumes) ISBN 9780393026290
- Behind the Throne: Servants of Power to Imperial Presidents, 1898–1968 (University of Wisconsin Press, 1993) [co-editor with Thomas J. McCormick] ISBN 9780299137403
- The American Search for Opportunity, 1865–1913 (Cambridge University Press, 1993), Volume II of The Cambridge History of American Foreign Relations (rev. ed. 2013, Volume II of The New Cambridge History of American Foreign Relations)
- The Clash: U.S.-Japanese Relations Throughout History (W. W. Norton & Co., 1997); excerpt; also see online review by Jon Davidann ISBN 9780393318371
- Michael Jordan and the New Global Capitalism (W. W. Norton & Co., 1999; exp. ed., 2002) ISBN 9780393323696
- The Deadly Bet: LBJ, Vietnam, and the 1968 Election (Rowman & Littlefield, 2005) ISBN 9780742576254

Selected articles and chapters

- "United States Depression Diplomacy and the Brazilian Revolution, 1893–1894", The Hispanic American Historical Review, Vol. 40, No. 1 (February 1960)
- "A Note on the 'Mercantilistic Imperialism' of Alfred Thayer Mahan", Mississippi Valley Historical Review, Vol. 48, No. 4 (March 1962)
- "The Third Cold War: Kissinger Years and Carter Years" (Charles Edmondson Historical Lectures, 1979–1980; Baylor University Press)
- "Liberty and Power: U.S. Diplomatic History, 1750-1945" in Eric Foner, ed., The New American History (Temple University Press, 1990)
- "The Post September 11 Debate over Empire, Globalization, and Fragmentation", Political Science Quarterly, Vol. 117, No. 1 (Spring, 2002)
- "Some Perspectives in U.S. Foreign Relations", Diplomatic History, Vol. 31, No. 3 (June 2007)
- Lafeber, Walter (2009). "The Rise and Fall of Colin Powell and the Powell Doctrine". Political Science Quarterly. 124: 71–93. doi:10.1002/j.1538-165X.2009.tb00642.x.
