= American History: A Survey =

- Twelfth Edition (2007)
- Author: Richard N. Current; T. Harry Williams; Frank Freidel; Alan Brinkley
- Subject: United States history
- Publisher: McGraw-Hill
- Publication date: 1961 (1st ed.); 2009 (13th ed.)
- Publication place: United States
- Pages: 922 (13th ed.)
- ISBN: 0-07-338549-2 (13th ed.)

American History: A Survey is a textbook first published in 1961 that was written initially by the historians Richard N. Current, T. Harry Williams, and Frank Freidel and later by Alan Brinkley, the Allan Nevins professor of history at Columbia University. The book provides an account of United States history spanning from the arrival of Christopher Columbus to the age of globalization in the most recent editions. As of December 2014, the current edition is the 14th published in 2011.

This textbook has been commonly used in AP United States History classes and in college survey courses.

== Content ==
American History: A Survey is organized in a way that reflects a high school-level U.S. history course. The chapters follow the nation's history chronologically.

In the preface to the book, Brinkley states his purpose is "to be a thorough, balanced, and versatile account of America's past that instructors and students will find accessible and appropriate no matter what approach to the past a course chooses."

American History: A Survey includes supplemental features such as "Where Historians Disagree" essays. The text also incorporates full-color maps with captions and chapter introductions that focus on the main themes of the chapter.

== Usage ==
In 2004, American History: A Survey was found to be used in 14 of 258 U.S. history survey college courses, which made it the fifth most popular textbook. At universities (as opposed to community and junior colleges) it was the fourth most popular textbook.

== Editions ==
- 1st edition, 1961, OCLC 1118352
- 2nd edition, 1966
- 3rd edition, 1971
- 4th edition, 1974, ISBN 0-394-31863-3
- 5th edition, 1979
- 6th edition, 1983
- 7th edition, 1986
- 8th edition, 1991, ISBN 0-07-015026-5
- 9th edition, 1997
- 10th edition, 1999, ISBN 0-07-303390-1
- 11th edition, 2003, ISBN 0-07-242436-2
- 12th edition, 2007, ISBN 0-07-312492-3
- 13th edition, 2009, ISBN 0-07-338549-2
- 14th edition, 2011, ISBN 0-07-737950-0
- 15th edition, 2015, ISBN 0-07-351329-6
