= Alan Brinkley =

American political historian (1949–2019)

- Born: June 2, 1949; Washington, D.C., U.S.
- Died: June 16, 2019 (aged 70); New York City, U.S.
- Occupation: Political historian
- Known for: Voices of Protest: American History: A Survey; The Unfinished Nation

Academic background
- Education: Princeton University (A.B.); Harvard University (Ph.D.)

Academic work
- Discipline: American history
- Sub-discipline: Great Depression and World War II
- Institutions: Columbia University

Alan David Brinkley (June 2, 1949 – June 16, 2019) was an American political historian who taught for over 20 years at Columbia University. He was the Allan Nevins Professor of History until his death. From 2003 to 2009, he was University Provost.

== Early life ==
Brinkley was born in Washington, D.C., the son of Ann (Fischer) and David Brinkley, a long-time television newscaster at NBC and ABC. Alan was a brother of Joel Brinkley. He attended the Landon School, a private boys' preparatory school in Bethesda, Maryland, between 1958 and 1967. In 2011, the Alan Brinkley ’67 Lecture Series at Landon was created in his honor.

Brinkley graduated with an A.B. from the Woodrow Wilson School of Public and International Affairs at Princeton University in 1971. He had completed a 218-page senior thesis titled "The Gospel of Discontent: Huey Long in National Politics 1932-1935." His advisor was Professor Nancy Weiss Malkiel. He received his Ph.D. in history from Harvard University in 1979. His doctoral dissertation, "The Long and Coughlin Movements: Dissident Voices in the Great Depression", was directed by Frank Freidel, an authority on Franklin D. Roosevelt.

== Career ==
Brinkley's scholarship focused mainly on the period of the Great Depression and World War II. Among his books are Voices of Protest: Huey Long, Father Coughlin, and the Great Depression (1983), (Note: This was the 1980 award for hardcover History. From 1980 to 1983 in National Book Award history there were dual hardcover and paperback awards in most categories, and several nonfiction subcategories including General Nonfiction. Most of the paperback award-winners were reprints, including the 1983 History.) which won the National Book Award. Here he argued that the two demagogues were not proto-fascists, but represented genuine popular anxieties rooted in the American experience of the Great Depression. He also wrote The End of Reform: New Deal Liberalism in Recession and War (1995); Liberalism and its Discontents (1998); and The Publisher: Henry Luce and His American Century (2010), which won the Ambassador Book Prize and the Sperber Prize and was a finalist for the Pulitzer Prize. He also wrote two short biographies: Franklin D. Roosevelt (2009) and John F. Kennedy (2012).

His essay "The Problem of American Conservatism" was published in the American Historical Review in 1994 and sparked scholarly interest in a neglected topic.

He was one of three American historians to have been both Harmsworth Professor of American History at Oxford (1998–1999) and Pitt Professor of American History at Cambridge (2011–2012). He was an honorary fellow of the Rothermere American Institute at the University of Oxford. He received the Jerome Levenson Teaching Prize in 1982 at Harvard University, where Brinkley taught for seven years; and the Great Teacher Award at Columbia University in 2003, where he also became provost on July 1 of that year. His courses at Harvard were among the most popular at the university. He was elected to the American Academy of Arts and Sciences in 1999.

He was the chair of the board of the Century Foundation in New York and chairman of the National Humanities Center in North Carolina. He also served as a trustee of Oxford University Press from 2009 to 2012 and of the Dalton School.

In 2018, Columbia University Press published Alan Brinkley: A Life in History, edited by David Greenberg, Moshik Temkin, and Mason B. Williams. The book includes essays about Brinkley's scholarship and career by many of his doctoral advisees as well as personal essays by friends and colleagues of his including A. Scott Berg, Frank Rich, and Nicholas Lemann.

== Textbooks ==
Brinkley was the senior author of two best-selling American history textbooks, American History: A Survey and The Unfinished Nation. They are widely used in universities and in AP United States History high school classes. He also wrote the commonly used AP US History textbook American History: Connecting with the Past.

Brinkley assumed sole responsibility for the ninth edition of American History: A Survey from historians Richard N. Current, Frank Freidel, and T. Harry Williams. He had joined the team to help with the 1979 revisions. Historian Emil Pocock, evaluating Brinkley's 1995 revision, said it was

Typical of the mass market textbook. ... Brinkley offers a traditional narrative of American history. Built around a core of political and economic events, this attractive colored text contains a good selection of illustrations, maps, charts, and other graphics, as well as other features designed to make it stand out among the competition. ... This latest edition has integrated additional material on immigrants, Native Americans, African-Americans, and women into the political narrative.

== Personal details ==
He lived in Manhattan, New York with his wife, Evangeline Morphos, and his daughter, Elly.

On June 16, 2019, Brinkley died at his home in Manhattan from complications of frontotemporal dementia.

== Works ==
- America in the Twentieth Century (1960), co-authored with Frank Freidel; 5th ed. published in 1982 – used in college 20th century U.S. history classes.
- American History: A Survey, originally by Richard N. Current, T. Harry Williams, and Frank Freidel (1961), by Brinkley in recent editions, reaching the 11th ed. in 1995, 13th ed. in 2009, and 15th ed. in 2015 — used especially for AP U.S. History and International Baccalaureate History courses.
- 1982 Voices of Protest: Huey Long, Father Coughlin, and the Great Depression — winner of the National Book Award
- 1992 The Unfinished Nation: A Concise History of the American People (2 vols.). Later eds. are co-written by Harvey H. Jackson and Bradley Robert Rice.
- 1995 The End of Reform: New Deal Liberalism in Recession and War
- 1997 New Federalist Papers: Essays in Defense of the Constitution with Nelson W. Polsby and Kathleen M. Sullivan
- 1998 Liberalism and Its Discontents
- 1999 Culture and Politics in the Great Depression
- 2009 Franklin Delano Roosevelt
- 2010 The Publisher: Henry Luce and His American Century
- 2012 John F. Kennedy: The American Presidents Series: The 35th President, 1961-1963

== Awards ==
- 1983 National Book Award for Voices of Protest
- 1987 Joseph R. Levenson Memorial Teaching Prize, Harvard University
- 2003 Great Teacher Award, Columbia University
- 2006-2007 Scholarly Journal Award by Kathy Walh-Henshaw at St. Mary's Lancaster
