= AP United States History =

Advanced Placement course and exam

Advanced Placement (AP) United States History (also known as AP U.S. History, APUSH (/ˈeɪ.pʊʃ/), or AP U.S.) is a college-level course and examination offered to high school students through College Board as part of the Advanced Placement Program. This course surveys the history of The United States of America from approximately 1491 to the present day, (Note: Most exam questions cut off around the 1980s with the rise of Ronald Reagan) with the goal of helping students develop the same skills and methods used by historians. AP U.S. History explores eight themes throughout its curriculum, specifically: American and national identity; work, exchange, and technology; geography and the environment; migration and settlement; politics and power; America in the world; American and regional culture; and social structures.

== Course ==
The AP U.S. History course is designed to provide the same level of content and instruction that students would face in a two semester introductory college course in U.S. history. It generally uses a college-level textbook as the foundation for the course and covers nine periods of U.S. history, spanning from the pre-Columbian era to the present day. The percentage indicates the exam weighting of each content area:

Period	Percent
1491–1607	4–6%
1607–1754	6–8%
1754–1800	10–17%
1800–1848	10–17%
1844–1877	10–17%
1865–1898	10–17%
1890–1945	10–17%
1945–1980	10–17%
1980–present	4–6%

=== Textbooks ===
Commonly used textbooks that meet the curriculum requirements include:

- America's History (Henretta et al.)
- American History: A Survey (Brinkley)
- American Passages (Ayers et al.)
- The American Pageant (Bailey et al.)
- The American People (Nash et al.)
- By the People (Fraser)
- The Enduring Vision (Boyer et al.)
- Give Me Liberty! (Foner)
- Liberty, Equality, Power (Murrin et al.)
- Out of Many (Faragher et al.)
- A People and a Nation (Norton et al.)
- Fabric of a Nation (Stacy et al.)
- Advanced Placement U.S. History, AMSCO

=== Conservative criticism ===
American conservatives have criticized the course framework for downplaying American exceptionalism and failing to foster patriotism. In 2015, a bill to replace the course framework was passed by the Oklahoma House Committee on Common Education, but later withdrawn. The course framework was revised in 2015 in response to the criticism. In 2014, student protests in Colorado were held over plans by the Jefferson County Public Schools district board to revise the AP U.S. History curriculum to emphasize citizenship, patriotism, and respect for authority.

== Exam ==
The AP U.S. History exam lasts 3 hours and 15 minutes and consists of two sections, with the first (Section I) being divided into two parts. Section I part A includes 55 multiple-choice questions with each question containing four choices. The multiple choice questions cover American history from just before European contact with Native Americans to the present day. Questions are presented in sets of two to five questions organized around a primary source or an image (including, but not limited to, maps and political cartoons). Section I part B includes three short-answer questions. The first two questions are required, but students choose between the third and fourth questions. Students are given a total of 95 minutes (55 for the multiple-choice section and 40 for three short-answer questions) to complete Section I.

Section II is the free-response section, in which examinees write two essays. Section II, part A, is a document-based question (DBQ), which provides an essay prompt and seven short primary sources or excerpts related to the prompt. Students are expected to write an essay responding to the prompt in which they use the sources in addition to outside information. Section II, part B, provides three thematic essay prompts. Students must respond to only one of the three essay prompts. However, in 2020, due to the COVID-19 pandemic, the AP exams were administered remotely as drastically shortened open-note exams, and the exam consisted of a single modified DBQ essay.

Each long essay question on the exam may address any one of three possible historical reasoning processes: patterns of continuity and change, comparison, or causation. Each of the essay questions will address the same historical reasoning process. There is a fifteen-minute reading period for students to read the essay prompts, take notes, and brainstorm, but students may begin to write the essays before this period ends. Students will then have 100 minutes to write the two essays; 60 minutes are recommended for the DBQ and 40 minutes for the long essay, but students are free to work on the two essays as they see fit.

In May 2025, the AP U.S. History exam was taken by 518,247 students worldwide. making it second in terms of number of examinees, behind the AP English Language and Composition exam.

=== Scoring ===
Section I is worth 60% of the total AP exam score, with 40% of the total exam score derived from the student's performance on the multiple choice section and 20% of the total exam score derived from the student's performance on the short answer questions. The remaining 40% of the total exam score is derived from section II; the document-based question is worth 25% of the total exam score, while the long essay question is worth 15% of the total exam score. Since 2007, the score distributions are:

Score	2015	2016	2017	2018	2019	2020	2021	2022	2023	2024	2025	2026
5	9.4%	11.9%	10.8%	10.7%	11.8%	13.0%	10.1%	10.8%	10.6%	13%	14.2%	14%
4	18.0%	17.9%	17.7%	18.4%	18.4%	19.2%	15.9%	15.6%	14.8%	33%	36.2%	37%
3	23.7%	22.5%	22.3%	22.7%	23.4%	26.6%	21.2%	21.9%	22.1%	26%	23.3%	23%
2	24.8%	23.3%	23.5%	22.7%	22.0%	20.4%	21.6%	23.0%	22.7%	20%	18.4%	18%
1	24.0%	24.3%	25.6%	25.5%	24.3%	21.0%	31.2%	28.8%	29.8%	8%	8%	8%
% of Scores 3 or Higher	51.2%	52.4%	50.9%	51.8%	53.7%	58.7%	47.2%	48.2%	47.5%	72%	73.7%	74%
Mean	2.64	2.70	2.65	2.66	2.71	2.83	2.52	2.57	2.54	3.23	3.30	
Standard Deviation	1.28	1.33	1.32	1.32	1.33	1.31	1.34	1.33	1.33	1.15	1.16	
Number of Students	469,689	489,281	505,302	501,530	496,573	472,697	454,204	456,520	467,975	488,688	516,738	554,000

=== Composite score range ===
The College Board has released information on the approximate composite score range (previously out of 180) required to obtain each grade. As of 2022, the total possible composite score is 130. Exact cutoffs are set annually by the Chief Reader only after the scoring of that year's examinations.

Final Score	Range (1996)	Range (2001)	Range (2002)	Range (2006)	Range (2022)
5	117–180	114–180	115–180	111–180	97–130
4	96–116	92–113	94–114	91–110	80–96
3	79–95	74–91	76–93	76–90	63–79
2	51–78	42–73	46–75	57–75	44–62
1	0–50	0–41	0–45	0–56	0–43

The above composite score cut points from 1996 to 2006 reflect the pre-2011 grading formula, which deducted 0.25 points for every incorrect multiple choice answer.

== See also ==
- History of the United States
