= Metaconstitution =

Set of rules prior to a formal constitution

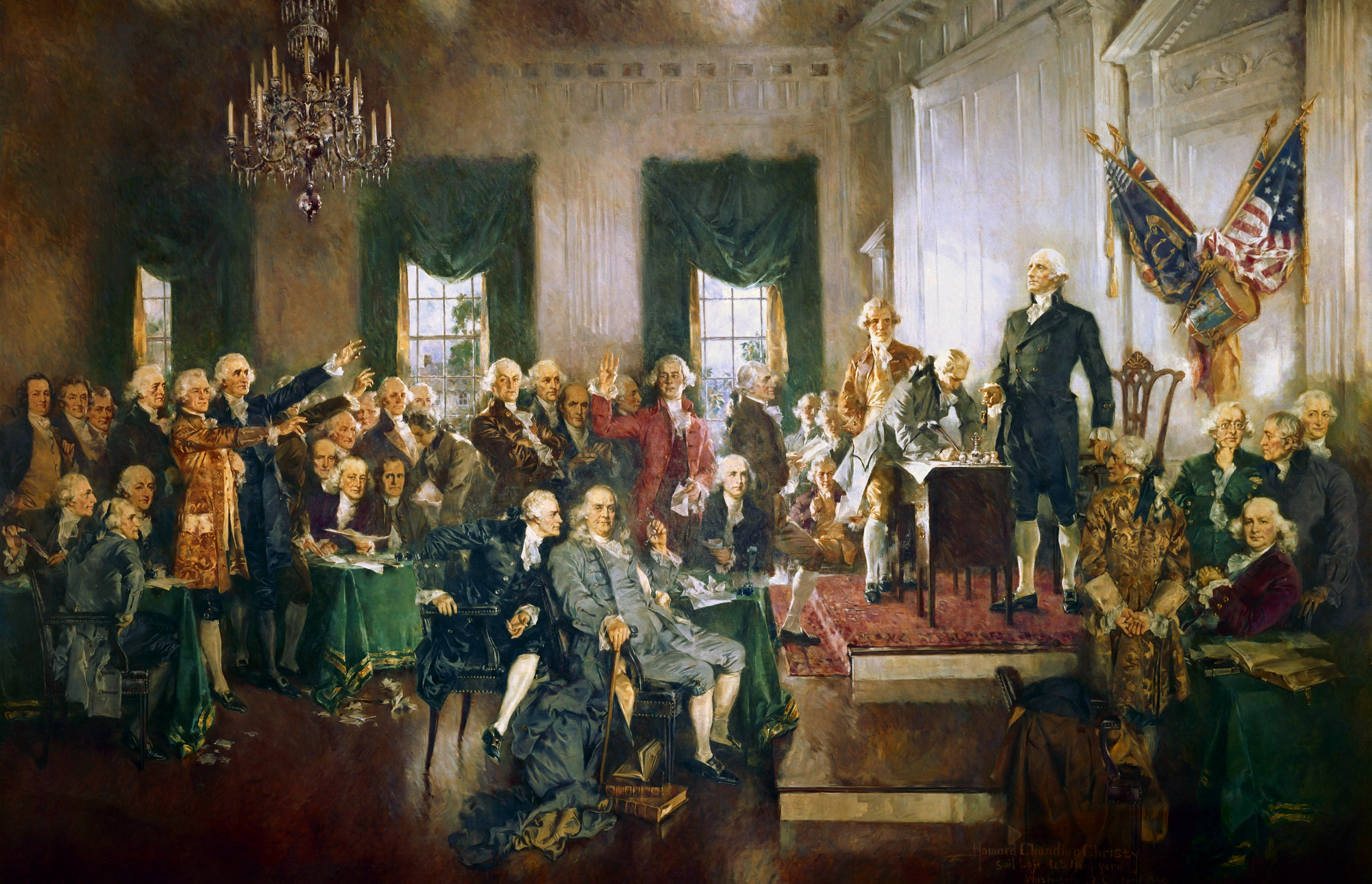
Delegates of the Philadelphia Convention. Before this meeting, only a de facto metaconstitution existed.

A metaconstitution is a set of pre-constitutional rules. It is in lieu of a formalized constitution and consists of accepted axiomatic policy. The constitution is similar to or developed from this. A metaconstitution is also less binding, and can be used to a less rigid form of government. To many nations, the metaconstitution provides an "exit-option", where they may variate from the written document. A metaconstitution, unlike formal constitutions, never needs to be written. Its creation results from the morality and judgment of the people. To be formulated, the people must be generally opposed to anarchy and must desire some form of governing force.

Although vague in concept, the metaconstitution almost always creates the basic roles of leader v. follower. The purpose of the document, however, prevents the placement of total power on the leader. The populace is trusted to self-govern except in severe cases. Such theory does not differ much from salutary neglect or laissez faire.

== Historical concept ==
Many prominent political philosophers have discoursed on the subject of metaconstitutionalism, though not directly. Some address the topic as a looser constitution in which the government's singular duty is to protect the people and vice versa. Per Alexis de Tocqueville:

If it be admitted that a man possessing absolute power may misuse that power . . . . why should not a majority be liable to the same reproach? Men do not change their characters by uniting with each other. . . . For myself, when I feel the hand of power lie heavy on my brow, I care but little to know who oppresses me; and I am not the more disposed to pass beneath the yoke because it is held out to me by the arms of a million of men.

— Alexis de Tocqueville (1805-1859), Democracy in America, New York: New American Library, 1956, pp. 114, 149

The concept of metaconstitutionalism received light during the Constitutional Convention, as a possible replacement to the Articles of Confederation. Per the Federalist, Number 51:

In framing a government which is to be administered by men over men, the great difficulty lies in this: you must first enable the government to control the governed; and in the next place oblige it to control itself . A dependence on the people is, no doubt, the primary control on government; but experience has taught mankind the necessity of auxiliary precautions.

— Federalist, Number 51

== Criticisms ==
A metaconstitution is constructed to provide a looser equivalent for government. However, a metaconstitutionalistic society is more likely to suffer from domestic disorder. This is because the government cannot wield any power to control the outbreak. Lack of trade and corruption are also major difficulties for a metaconstitution. Again, the governments legal inability to enforce powerful law prevents it from containing situations. In this usage of "metaconstitution", it can also mean a constitution with a nearly non-existent executive branch.

== See also ==
- The Federalist Papers
- Alexis de Tocqueville
- Constitutionalism
- Constitutional economics
- Rule according to higher law
