= Deportivo Alavés Gloriosas =

Spanish football club

Alavés Gloriosas
- Full name: Deportivo Alavés Gloriosas
- Nickname: Albiazules (white-and-blues)
- Founded: 1996 (as CDF Gasteiz Cup); 11 June 2017 (as Alavés Gloriosas)
- Stadium: Ciudad Deportiva José Luis Compañón
- Capacity: 2,500
- President: Alfonso Fernández
- Head coach: Andrea Esteban Catalán
- League: Liga F
- 2025–26: Primera Federación, 2nd (promoted)
Home colours	Away colours	Third colours

Deportivo Alavés Gloriosas is a Spanish women's football team from Vitoria-Gasteiz, Álava, Basque Country, currently playing in the Segunda Federación. It is the women's section of Deportivo Alavés.

== History ==
Having begun the process of adding a women's football section to the club structure in the months prior, in summer 2017 Alavés had their new Gloriosas team installed directly into the second tier of the Spanish league setup as the result of a merger with established local club CD Gasteizko Neskak (Vitoria Girls) who had just completed a season competing at that level.

Under the agreement, the Gasteizko Neskak senior team's players were adopted by Alavés and now play home matches at the professional club's Ciudad Deportiva José Luis Compañón (Ibaia) training ground, wearing Alavés colours. Dafne Triviño, the long-serving coach and coordinator of Gasteizko Neskak, was appointed as the women's section coordinator for Alavés.

During the first season following the merger, the Gloriosas team often continued to be referred to as Gasteizko Neskak.

Alavés previously had a women's team, in partnership with Club San Ignacio (not to be confused with SD San Ignacio of Bilbao), from 2010 to 2013.

In summer 2019, the club confirmed they would be introducing a women's reserve team in the provincial leagues to act as a step between the youth and senior levels.

In the 2020–21 season, played in a two-phase format due to the COVID-19 pandemic in Spain, Alavés held off a challenge from Osasuna to win both the winter and spring regional groups and gain promotion to the Primera División for the first time.

Alavés competed in the Copa de la Reina for the first time in the 2021–22 season after the competition was opened up to all clubs in the top division and the level below; they entered at the third round stage but lost to Espanyol, one of the teams relegated at the end of the previous campaign.

=== Gasteiz Cup and Gasteizko Neskak ===
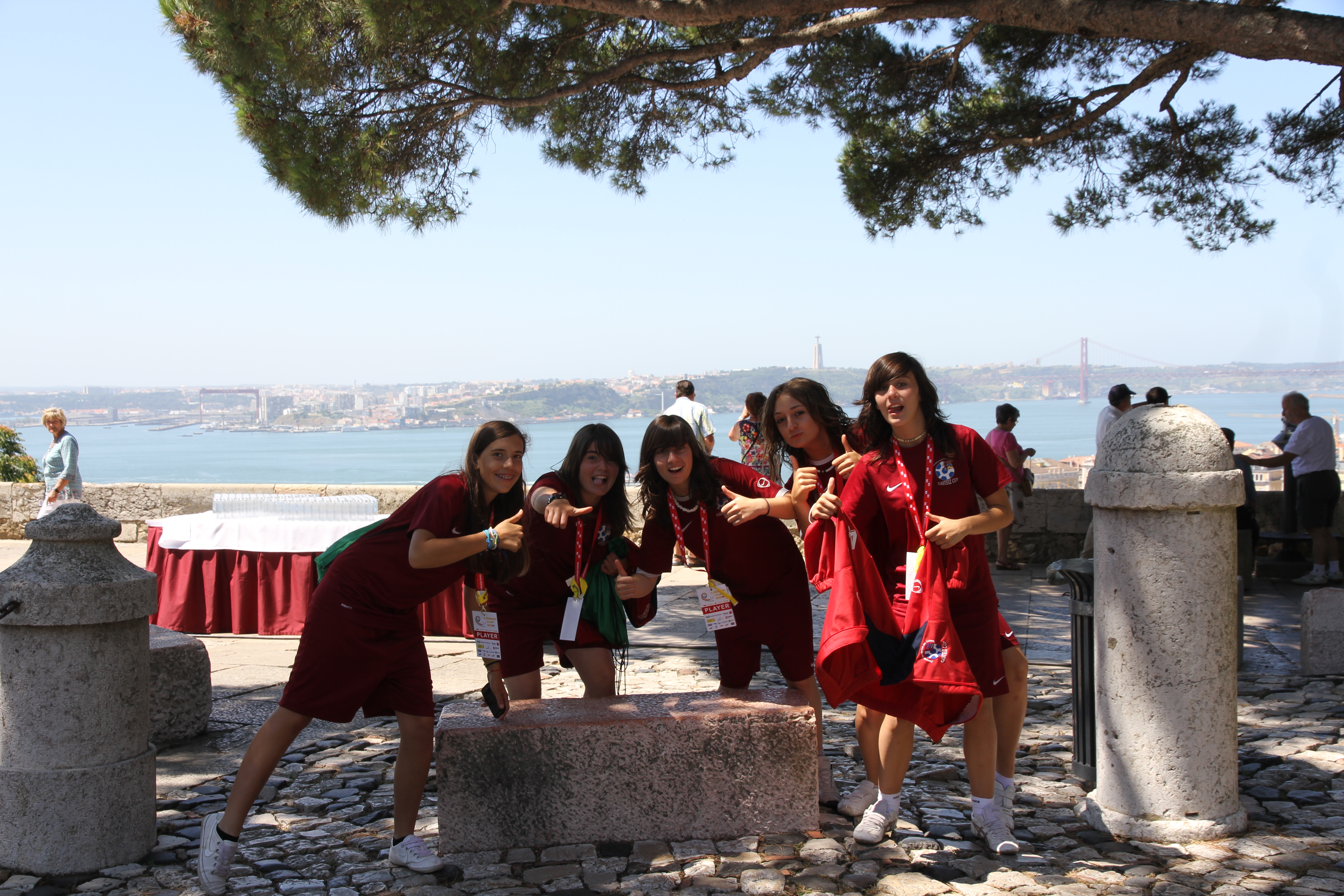
Gasteiz Cup youth squad members at a tournament in Portugal, 2011

Gasteizko Neskak, who wear pink-and-black and are based at the Betoño Sports Complex (also used by Alavés for training), continue to operate independently, with a second adult team in the Territorial Femenina Araba league (fourth level) as well as their existing youth teams, with support from Alavés as a 'partner club' in exchange for continued access to players.

For several years the organisation was known as CDF Gasteiz Cup, with the club hierarchy also arranging an annual youth tournament of the same name which attracted entrants from as far away as India – it was played for 18 years, the last edition held in 2014.

After winning the Preferente Álava league in 2010, Gasteiz Cup reached the Primera Nacional (second tier) in the 2010–11 season, finishing bottom of the table in their group. They are regular participants in international youth tournaments such as the Gothia Cup in Sweden. Yulema Corres, who won the Spanish league in 2016 with Athletic Bilbao, began her career with the club.

== Season by season ==
=== Gasteiz Cup / Gasteizko Neskak ===
Season	Division	Place	Copa d.l.R.
2007–08	Provincial	2nd (Note: As CDF Gasteiz Cup)	
2008–09	Provincial	1st	
2009–10	Provincial	1st	
2010–11	Primera Nacional	13th	
2011–12	Provincial	2nd (Note: The club operated a team called Gasteiz Cup (finishing 5th) and a team called Gasteizko Neskak (2nd) in the same division.)	
2012–13	Regional	3rd (Note: As Gasteizko Neskak.)	
2013–14	Regional	3rd	
2014–15	Regional	3rd	
2015–16	Regional	1st	
2016–17	2ª	8th	

=== Alavés-San Ignacio / Gloriosas ===
Season	Division	Place	Copa d.l.R.
2008–09	Provincial	2nd (Note: As Club San Ignacio)	
2009–10	Provincial	3rd	
2010–11	Provincial	9th (Note: Deportivo Alavés placed 9th; San Ignacio placed 2nd.)	
2011–12	Provincial	1st (Note: As Fundación Alavés-San Ignacio.)	
2012–13	Regional	13th (Note: As Deportivo Alavés.)	
2013–2017: No participation
2017–18	2ª	11th (Note: As Deportivo Alavés Gloriosas.) (Note: Placing in one of 7 regionalised groups.)	
2018–19	2ª	2nd (Note: Placing in one of 6 regionalised groups.) (Note: The team qualified to move up to the new Primera División B but remained in the second tier of the system due to its creation.)	
2019–20	2ªP	5th (Note: Placing in one of 2 regionalised groups.) (Note: Season curtailed due to the COVID-19 pandemic in Spain.)	
2020–21	2ªP	1st (Note: In 1 of 4 regionalised Autumn subgroups.)/1st (Note: in 1 of 2 regionalised 'promotion/retention' Spring subgroups.)	
2021–22	1ª	11th	Third round
2022–23	1ª	16th	Round of 16
2023–24	2ªP	9th	Round of 16
2024–25	2ªP	2nd (Note: Finished 2nd with the same amount of points as leader Alhama CF but failed to win promotion play-offs)	Second round
2025–26	2ªP	2nd (Note: Finished 2nd and promoted directly to 2026–27 Liga F as leader FC Barcelona B were ineligible for promotion.)	Round of 16

== Players ==
=== Current squad ===
As of 17 July 2026

Note: Flags indicate national team as defined under FIFA eligibility rules; some limited exceptions apply. Players may hold more than one non-FIFA nationality.

No.	Pos.	Nation	Player
2	DF	ESP	Laia Parera
5	DF	ESP	Inés Altamira
6	MF	CHI	Nayadet López
9	FW	ESP	Reyes Moreno
10	MF	ESP	Laura Navajas
13	GK	ESP	Sofía Fuente
14	MF	ESP	Celia Ochoa
16	DF	ESP	Almudena Rivero
17	MF	ESP	Carmen Sobrón
18	MF	ESP	Elena Viles

No.	Pos.	Nation	Player
20	MF	ESP	Ainhoa Guallar
21	FW	ESP	María García
24	DF	ESP	Merche Izal
26	DF	ESP	Aiala Mugeta
27	FW	ESP	Izaro Tores
28	MF	ESP	Ariadna Nayaded González
—	DF	FRA	Juliette Vidal
—	DF	MAR	Hanane Aït El Haj
—	MF	KOR	Kim Shin-ji (on loan from AS Roma)
—	MF	ENG	Sarah Brasero-Carreira (on loan from West Ham United)

== Honours ==
CDF Gasteizko Cup

- Álava Territorial League: 2008–09, 2009–10

Alavés-San Ignacio

- Álava Territorial League: 2011–12

Gasteizko Neskak

- Basque Regional League: 2015–16

Alavés Gloriosas

- Segunda División Pro: 2020–21 (north section)

== See also ==
- Category:Deportivo Alavés Gloriosas players
