= María García =

María García may refer to:

- María García (canoeist) (born 1978), Spanish sprint canoer
- Maria Garcia (speed skater) (born 1985), American Olympic speed skater
- María Dolores García Cotarelo (born 1943), Granada politician
- Maria Dolors García Ramón (born 1943), Spanish geographer
- María Esther García López (born 1948), poet, writer; president, Asturias Writers Association
- María Guadalupe García Zavala (1878–1963), Mexican Roman Catholic religious sister
- María Helena García Brunel (1917–1996), Uruguayan painter
- Maria Garcia Sanchis (1881–1936), Valencian weaver and militiawoman
- María Esther García (born 1954), Cuban fencer
- María Fernanda García (born 1967), Mexican actress
- María Inés García (born 1964), Colombian dressage rider
- María García (judoka) (born 1987), Dominican Republican judoka
- María Julia Mantilla (María Julia Mantilla García, born 1984), Peruvian beauty queen
- Maria Malibran (María Felicia García Sitches, 1808–1836), opera singer
- Maica García Godoy (born 1990), Spanish water polo player
- María García (photographer) (born 1936), Mexican photographer and photojournalist
- María Inés García (born 1964), Colombian dressage rider
- Maria Cristina Garcia (born 1960), American historian
- María Yvett García (born 1996), Dominican volleyball player
- María Luisa García (1919–2019), Spanish Asturian chef and cookbook author
- Maria Angela Garcia, Filipina politician
- Maria Garcia (activist) (1898–?), journalist and community organizer in the Mexican American community in Phoenix, Arizona
- Maria Garcia (Arizona politician)
- Maricris Garcia (born 1987), Filipino singer
