= William B. Hesseltine =

American historian (1902–1963)

William Hesseltime
- Born: February 21, 1902; Brucetown, Virginia, U.S.
- Died: December 8, 1963 (aged 61); Madison, Wisconsin, U.S.

Academic background
- Education: Washington and Lee University (BA); University of Virginia (MA); Ohio State University (PhD)
- Doctoral advisor: Arthur Charles Cole

Academic work
- Institutions: University of Wisconsin–Madison
- Notable students: Kenneth M. Stampp; Benjamin Quarles; Frank Freidel; Richard N. Current; Stephen E. Ambrose; T. Harry Williams; Russel B. Nye; Roderick Nash

William Best Hesseltine (February 21, 1902 – December 8, 1963) was an American historian and politician. As a historian and professor at the University of Wisconsin–Madison for nearly three decades, Hesseltine's field of expertise was mid-19th century American history, especially the Civil War, Reconstruction Era and American South. He also became known as the mentor of a generation of American historians, many of whom also won prizes for their writing.

== Early and family life ==
Originally from Brucetown, Frederick County, Virginia, he was born to Mae Rosa Best (1860–1929) and her husband William Edward Hesseltine (1860–1905), who had married in Maricopa County, Arizona (Phoenix) in 1901. He had no memory of his father and spent his early childhood in Brucetown with his mother and her parents. His maternal grandfather, Dr. William Janney Best (1834–1908), was born in Loudoun County (and may have been related to John Janney a prominent local and Virginia politician; his farmer father James Best (b. 1805) owned an enslaved man and woman in 1840 and 1860). Dr. Best did not own slaves, nor join either side in the American Civil War, but practiced medicine slightly to the west in Clarke County, including treating soldiers of both armies. After the war, Dr. Best moved a little further westward into Frederick County and established his practice in Brucetown, near the border with the new state of West Virginia and the old Winchester/Martinsburg Turnpike. After his grandfather's death, young Hesseltine studied at the Millersburg Military Institute in Kentucky founded by his uncle, Col. Carl M. Best (including training drills with Civil War era rifles, which gave him a lifelong distaste of military regimentation), then returned to Virginia's Shenandoah Valley to attend Washington and Lee University (rather than nearby VMI) and received a bachelor's degree in 1922. He then received a master's degree from the University of Virginia and his PhD. from the Ohio State University. He would receive a Litt.D. from Washington and Lee in 1949.

In 1923 Hesseltine married Katherine Louise Kramer (1902–1977), and they had a son, William Hesseltine Jr. (1925–2001), and a daughter, Kitty Mae (b. 1928).

== Career ==
Hesseltine first taught at Scarritt-Morrissville College (now Central Methodist College) in Missouri, but became best known for teaching history at the University of Wisconsin-Madison from 1932 until his death. By 1930, he was a professor at the University of Chattanooga (now the University of Tennessee at Chattanooga), but left when the Wisconsin position became available. Although his thesis and first book (published in 1930 and reprinted in 1998), concerned Civil War prisons (and their lamentable conditions in North and South), and he published well over 100 articles, Hesseltine became best known as a biographer and teacher of future historians. His biography of General U.S. Grant in 1935 (republished in 1957 and available online through the HathiTrust) became the authoritative biography of its subject for decades. In 1945 Hesseltine wrote: "Writing intellectual history is like trying to nail jelly to the wall."

Hesseltine's graduate seminars (some gathered around a table he noted had once been used by students of Frederick Jackson Turner) became known for rigorous application of the historian's craft, beginning with cite checking the published work of other distinguished members of the history department, and discussing whether the errors found mattered. Many of his doctoral students at Madison went on to become influential historians in their own right, including several presidents of the Organization of American Historians or Southern Historical Society and winners of the Pulitzer Prize and Bancroft Prize for historical writing. They included T. Harry Williams, Kenneth M. Stampp, Frank Freidel, Richard N. Current and Stephen E. Ambrose. In addition, Hesseltine influenced the development of the field of rhetoric through his mentoring of Robert G. Gunderson.

Hesseltine opposed Franklin D. Roosevelt's foreign policy in the years before the United States entered World War II, but in 1945 took leave to teach at the GI American University in England. He was for a time an active member of the Socialist Party of the United States. One of his books, republished shortly before his death, concerned third party movements in the United States.

Hesseltine was active in numerous professional associations, including the Southern Historical Association (president in 1960) and the Wisconsin Historical Society (board member from 1951, president from 1961 until his death in 1963).

== Death and legacy ==
Hesseltine died of a massive stroke or heart attack on December 8, 1963, and was survived by his widow and children. In 1965, the Wisconsin Historical Society established an award in his honor. His papers are at the Wisconsin State Historical Society in Madison, and marking the 20th anniversary of his death, the society published several articles about Hesseltine in its winter 1982–1983 issue. His former student, later professor and popular historian Stephen E. Ambrose, endowed a professorship in military history at the University of Wisconsin-Madison in his honor, now named jointly after Ambrose and Hesseltine.

== Selected works ==
- Civil War Prisons (1930) purchase link.
- Ulysses S. Grant: Politician (1935) view online.
- A History of the South: 1607–1936 (1936) purchase link.
- Lincoln and the War Governors (1948) purchase link.
- The Rise and Fall of Third Parties from Anti-Masonry to Wallace (1948) view online.
- Confederate Leaders in the New South (1950) purchase link.
- Pioneer's Mission: The Story of Lyman Copeland Draper (1954) view online.
- The South in American History (1960) view online.
- A History of the South, 1617–1937 (1960) view online.
- Lincoln's Plan of Reconstruction (1960) view online.
- The Blue and the Gray on the Nile (1961) with Hazel Catherine Wolf purchase link.
- Third-Party Movements in the United States (1962) view online.
- The Tragic Conflict: The Civil War and Reconstruction (1962) purchase link.
