= Robert Morse (disambiguation) =

Robert Morse (1931-2022) was an American actor and singer.

Robert Morse may also refer to:

- Robert S. Morse (1924–2015), American bishop
- Robert W. Morse (1921–2001), American academic and administrator
- Robert Morse Crunden (1940–1999), American historian
- Bob Morse (born 1951), American basketball player

== See also ==
- Robert Morss Lovett (1870–1956), American academic
