= 2015–16 Ligas Regionales (Spanish women's football) =

Regional
- Season: 2015–16

== Galicia ==
Pos	Team	Pld	W	D	L	GF	GA	GD	Pts	Promotion
1	Atlántida Matamá	29	25	3	1	152	18	+134	78	Promotion to Segunda División
2	CCAR Valladares	29	23	3	3	109	32	+77	72	
3	SD Orzán B	29	16	7	6	62	26	+36	55	
4	Arcadia Escola de Fútbol	29	15	5	9	69	41	+28	50	
5	Sárdoma CF B	29	14	6	9	68	57	+11	48	
6	AD Lavadores	29	14	5	10	82	49	+33	47	
7	CP Alertanavia	29	14	4	11	87	52	+35	46	
8	San Miguel CF	29	12	7	10	77	61	+16	43	
9	Umia CF	29	12	6	11	67	58	+9	42	
10	SD O Val	29	12	5	12	78	55	+23	41	
11	Victoria CF B	29	12	3	14	59	62	−3	39	
12	Xuventú Aguiño SD	29	11	3	15	73	79	−6	36	
13	ACRD Boiro	29	6	7	16	49	68	−19	25	
14	ADC Monte Forte	29	3	2	24	48	104	−56	11	Relegation to Lower leagues
15	SD Noalla	29	0	0	29	4	287	−283	0	Relegation to Lower leagues
16	Moledo CF	15	3	0	12	25	60	−35	9	Relegation to Lower leagues

=== Top scorers ===
Rank	Player	Club	Goals
1	Noemi Gª Rey	SD O Val	51
2	Noelia Pereira	Atlántida Matama	36
3	Mirian González	Arcadia Escola de Fútbol	31
4	Alba María Hernández	San Miguel CF	27
4	Alexandra Pichel	CAR Valladares	27
6	Andrea Fernández	CAR Valladares	24
7	Lorena Codeseda	Atlántida Matama	23
7	Bárbara Fernández	AD Lavadores	23
9	Sara Olveira	Xuventudu Aguiño	20
10	Montserrat Coello	CP Alertanavia	19
10	Lucía Rodríguez	Atlántida Matama	19

== Asturias ==
The top team was promoted to Segunda División.

Pos	Team	Pld	W	D	L	GF	GA	GD	Pts	Promotion
1	Oviedo Moderno CF B	26	25	1	0	143	4	+139	76	
2	Gijón FF	26	23	1	2	158	22	+136	70	Promotion to Segunda División
3	Langreo Femenino	26	20	3	3	114	22	+92	63	
4	CF Llosalín	26	14	4	8	66	63	+3	46	
5	UD Llanera	26	15	0	11	85	47	+38	45	
6	Oviedo Moderno CF C	26	12	4	10	54	28	+26	40	
7	CD Manuel Rubio	27	13	1	13	67	69	−2	40	
8	CD Femiastur B	26	10	4	12	73	97	−24	34	
9	FF Las Vegas	26	10	1	15	42	77	−35	31	
10	Club Hispano	26	8	5	13	32	69	−37	29	
11	Urraca CF	26	8	3	15	30	92	−62	27	
12	UD Prados San Julián	26	2	1	23	14	125	−111	7	
13	Gijón FF B	26	2	0	24	24	187	−163	6	

== Castile and León ==
The top team was promoted to Segunda División.

Pos	Team	Pld	W	D	L	GF	GA	GD	Pts	Promotion
1	CD San Pío X	30	28	1	1	182	14	+168	85	Promotion to Segunda División
2	León FF	30	25	2	3	125	25	+100	77	
3	CD Ponferrada	30	24	1	5	93	31	+62	73	
4	Santa Ana FS	30	19	5	6	89	38	+51	62	
5	Arandina CF	30	18	3	9	110	54	+56	57	
6	CD Amigos del Duero B	30	16	3	11	76	48	+28	51	
7	CD San Juanillo	30	15	1	14	91	73	+18	46	
8	CD Salamanca FF B	30	14	2	14	92	60	+32	44	
9	CDF Trobajo del Camino	30	12	4	14	63	75	−12	40	
10	CD Carbajosa	30	12	4	14	59	72	−13	40	
11	CD Parquesol B	30	11	6	13	42	49	−7	39	
12	CP Casa Social Católica B	30	8	2	20	61	118	−57	26	
13	CD Nuestra Señora de Belén B	30	7	5	18	52	84	−32	26	
14	CD Laguna Promesas	30	4	3	23	30	141	−111	15	
15	Unión Valdornesa CD	30	2	5	23	33	135	−102	11	
16	CD Unión Arroyo	30	1	1	28	17	198	−181	4	

=== Top scorers ===
Rank	Player	Club	Goals
1	Mónica Camarón	CD San Pío X	61
2	Sara Belén Rupérez	Arandina CF	50
3	Sandra Luengo	CD San Pío X	40
4	Cristina Martínez	Santa Ana FS	36
5	Irene Martínez	León FF	31
5	Paula Román	CD San Juanillo	31
7	Teresa Vicente	CD Amigos del Duero B	27
8	María Uriel	León FF	25
9	Nadia Torio	CD San Juanillo	24
10	Alejandra Terán	CD Ntra. Sra. de Belén B	22

== Cantabria ==
As Gimnástica de Torrelavega resigned to promotion, CD Monte was promoted to Segunda División as runner-up.

Pos	Team	Pld	W	D	L	GF	GA	GD	Pts	Qualification
1	Gimnástica de Torrelavega	24	22	2	0	141	17	+124	68	
2	CD Monte	24	21	0	3	148	37	+111	63	Promotion to Segunda División
3	CDE Ave Fénix Racing B	24	14	2	8	101	57	+44	44	
4	CD Ramales	24	14	2	8	66	61	+5	44	
5	CD Bezana	24	13	3	8	52	43	+9	42	
6	CD Cayón	24	12	1	11	61	54	+7	37	
7	CD Laredo	24	7	7	10	44	70	−26	28	
8	AD Mioño B	24	7	4	13	61	107	−46	25	
9	CD Tropezón	24	7	3	14	56	79	−23	24	
10	CD Naval	24	6	3	15	41	75	−34	21	
11	Ampuero FC	24	7	0	17	53	103	−50	21	
12	SD Textil Escudo	24	5	3	16	32	90	−58	18	
13	CD Guriezo	24	4	4	16	29	92	−63	16	

=== Top scorers ===
Rank	Player	Club	Goals
1	Jimena Cabrero	CD Monte	47
2	Alazne Barrio	CD Ramales	37
3	Themis Moreno	CD Tropezón	34
4	Alexandra Alcalde	Gimástica de Torrelavega	31
5	María Sazatornil	CD Monte	24
6	Rebeca Gutiérrez	Gimástica de Torrelavega	23
7	María Abascal	CD Cayón	20
7	Cristina Mesones	Ampuero FC	20
9	Pilar Mena	CD Monte	19
10	Sara Campo	CD Monte	18

== Basque Country ==
Pos	Team	Pld	W	D	L	GF	GA	GD	Pts	Qualification
1	CD Gasteizko Neskak	30	25	4	1	92	18	+74	79	Promotion to Segunda División
2	CD Arratia	30	22	5	3	66	19	+47	71	Promotion to Segunda División
3	Bizkerre FT	30	21	5	4	73	19	+54	68	
4	Zarautz KE	30	15	8	7	39	26	+13	53	
5	SD Beasain	30	13	7	10	35	28	+7	46	
6	CD Ugao	30	12	8	10	33	31	+2	44	
7	Erandioko Betiko Neskak FKE	30	13	4	13	47	55	−8	43	
8	Barakaldo CF	30	11	7	12	34	42	−8	40	
9	Añorga KKE B	30	11	6	13	50	40	+10	39	
10	CD Elorrio	30	10	7	13	30	38	−8	37	
11	Aurrerá Vitoria B	30	10	5	15	34	55	−21	35	
12	CD Hernani	30	7	10	13	36	51	−15	31	
13	ADF Berrio-Otxoa	30	7	7	16	34	69	−35	28	
14	Oiartzun KE B	30	7	4	19	31	56	−25	25	
15	CD Lakua	30	6	4	20	29	54	−25	22	
16	Peña Athletic de Santurtzi CF	30	1	7	22	14	76	−62	10	

=== Top scorers ===
Rank	Player	Club	Goals
1	Mery	Gasteizko Neskak	25
2	Maia	Gasteizko Neskak	17
3	Maddi G.	Gasteizko Neskak	15
4	Arrate	CD Arratia	14
4	Deborah Dolara	Erandioko Betiko Neskak	14
6	Marta San Adrián	Añorga "B"	13
6	Xandra Urkijo	Erandioko Betiko Neskak	13
8	Ane Miren Salazar	Bizkerre FT	12
9	Andrea Uribarri	Aurrera Vitoria "B"	11
9	Olatz Rivera	Bizkerre FT	11

== Navarre ==
The top team was promoted to Segunda División.

Pos	Team	Pld	W	D	L	GF	GA	GD	Pts	Promotion
1	Berriozar CF	26	24	1	1	97	23	+74	73	Promotion to Segunda División
2	Gazte Berriak	26	23	2	1	108	18	+90	71	
3	CD Amigó	26	19	0	7	72	37	+35	57	
4	CD Huarte	26	15	5	6	64	44	+20	50	
5	SD Lagunak	26	15	3	8	50	39	+11	48	
6	CD Oberena	26	13	2	11	48	50	−2	41	
7	CD Ardoi B	26	11	5	10	40	30	+10	38	
8	UDC Burladés	26	11	2	13	60	65	−5	35	
9	CD Kirol Sport	26	9	3	14	51	61	−10	30	
10	CD Zarramonza	26	6	6	14	25	54	−29	24	
11	Peña Sport FC	26	7	2	17	39	58	−19	23	
12	CD Universidad de Navarra	26	5	3	18	26	65	−39	18	
13	CD Castejón	26	4	1	21	27	84	−57	13	
14	CD Iruntxiki de Beriáin	26	2	1	23	14	93	−79	7	

== La Rioja ==
There was not any promotion to Segunda División.

Pos	Team	Pld	W	D	L	GF	GA	GD	Pts
1	Recreativo Villamediana	12	11	0	1	47	9	+38	33
2	Atlético Revellín	12	9	2	1	48	8	+40	29
3	EDF Logroño B	12	7	1	4	39	19	+20	22
4	CD Pradejón	12	6	2	4	52	20	+32	20
5	Yagüe CF	12	3	0	9	36	56	−20	9
6	CEF Nájera	12	2	1	9	36	56	−20	7
7	Haro Sport Club	12	1	0	11	16	106	−90	3

=== Top scorers ===
Rank	Player	Club	Goals
1	Carmen Sobrón	CEF Nájera	21
2	Garazi Facila	CD Pradejón	15
3	Judith Luzuriaga	CEF Nájera	12
4	Laura Bazares	Haro Sport Club	11
4	Sara Benito	CD Pradejón	11
4	Irene Zuñiga	Recreativo Villamediana	11

== Aragon ==
The top team was promoted to Segunda División.

=== Territorial 1 ===
Pos	Team	Pld	W	D	L	GF	GA	GD	Pts
1	RSD Santa Isabel	20	19	0	1	113	14	+99	57
2	CD Delicias	20	13	2	5	81	27	+54	41
3	Cella CF	20	13	2	5	53	34	+19	41
4	Estadio Miralbueno-El Olivar	20	12	2	6	80	30	+50	38
5	CD Transportes Alcaine C	20	10	4	6	67	34	+33	34
6	CD Calanda	20	9	4	7	54	36	+18	31
7	AD Peñaflor	20	9	2	9	48	51	−3	29
8	Calatayud EFB	20	9	0	11	46	42	+4	27
9	Utebo FC	20	6	0	14	46	57	−11	18
10	CF Fleta	20	2	0	18	31	71	−40	6
11	CF Illueca	20	0	0	20	6	229	−223	0

=== Territorial 2 ===
Pos	Team	Pld	W	D	L	GF	GA	GD	Pts
1	CD Transportes Alcaine "A"	18	16	2	0	119	12	+107	50
2	Peña Ferranca	18	13	4	1	64	13	+51	43
3	UD Aragonesa	18	12	3	3	64	24	+40	39
4	CD Peñas Oscenses B	18	8	4	6	31	25	+6	28
5	SD Ejea	18	8	3	7	63	55	+8	27
6	Villanueva CF	18	8	2	8	34	48	−14	26
7	Eureka 7	18	7	2	9	33	48	−15	23
8	Peña Ferranca B	18	4	1	13	13	47	−34	13
9	Atlético Monzalbarba	18	3	1	14	15	87	−72	10
10	CD Transportes Alcaine D	18	0	0	18	5	82	−77	0

== Catalonia ==
The top team was promoted to Segunda División.

Pos	Team	Pld	W	D	L	GF	GA	GD	Pts	Promotion
1	CE Sabadell	30	25	3	2	112	18	+94	78	Promotion to Segunda División
2	CE Sant Gabriel C	30	25	0	5	118	28	+90	75	
3	CD Fontsanta-Fatjo	30	18	8	4	99	54	+45	62	
4	CF Sant Pere Pescador	30	19	4	7	108	83	+25	61	
5	CF Atlètic Prat	30	19	4	7	89	39	+50	61	
6	CF Femeni Tortosa-Ebre	30	17	3	10	81	66	+15	54	
7	CD Fontsanta Fatjó	30	15	6	9	56	44	+12	51	
8	Atlètic Camp Clar	30	13	4	13	76	70	+6	43	
9	UE Porqueres	30	13	2	15	79	70	+9	41	
10	EE Guineueta	30	13	2	15	63	69	−6	41	
11	CF Pardinyes	30	12	4	14	62	74	−12	40	
12	UE Sant Andreu	30	7	5	18	42	71	−29	26	
13	Santa Eugenia CF	30	6	5	19	49	97	−48	23	
14	FC Santpedor	30	4	3	23	32	124	−92	15	Relegation to Lower leagues
15	CE Júpiter	30	3	4	23	38	131	−93	13	Relegation to Lower leagues
16	Penya Barcelonista de Lloret de Mar	30	2	1	27	55	173	−118	7	Relegation to Lower leagues

=== Top scorers ===
Rank	Player	Club	Goals
1	Ana Núria Rios	Penya Barcelonista de Lloret de Mar	47
2	Tania Martínez	FC Santpedor	42
3	María Farreras	CF Atlètic Prat	30
3	Cristina González	CE Sabadell	30
3	Adriana Manau	CD Sant Gabriel B	30
6	Fatoumata Kanteh	UE Porqueres	28
7	Blanca Coscolin	CF Molins de Rei	27
8	Paula Denis	FC Santpedor	22
8	Silvia Masferrer	FC Santpedor	22
10	Laura Quesada	UE Porqueres	21

== Balearic Islands ==
The top team was promoted to Segunda División.

Pos	Team	Pld	W	D	L	GF	GA	GD	Pts	Promotion
1	Porto Cristo	18	16	0	2	107	25	+82	48	Promotion to Segunda División
2	Athletic Marratxí	18	15	2	1	79	16	+63	47	
3	Santa Ponsa	18	14	2	2	71	24	+47	44	
4	Sporting de Mahón	18	11	1	6	64	29	+35	34	
5	UD Collerense C	18	6	2	10	44	70	−26	20	
6	CD Algaida	18	7	1	10	47	49	−2	22	
7	AD Son Sardina	18	5	3	10	30	56	−26	18	
8	SCD Independiente	18	4	2	12	42	63	−21	14	
9	Atlético Jesús	18	4	1	13	15	49	−34	10	
10	Serralta	18	1	0	17	12	130	−118	0	

=== Top scorers ===
Rank	Player	Club	Goals
1	Bárbara Ginard	Porto Cristo	24
1	Marina Tugores	Santa Ponsa	24
3	Marina Cerezo	Porto Cristo	21
3	Rocío García	At. Marratxí	21
3	Ainoa Martín	Porto Cristo	21
6	Laura Martí	CF Sporting Mahonés	20
6	Rayyanes Soares	Santa Ponsa	20

== Valencian Community ==
The top team was promoted to Segunda División.

Pos	Team	Pld	W	D	L	GF	GA	GD	Pts	Promotion
1	CF Joventut Almassora	26	21	2	3	111	20	+91	65	Promotion to Segunda División
2	Sporting Plaza de Argel B	26	21	2	3	79	21	+58	65	
3	Villarreal CF B	26	15	1	10	45	35	+10	46	
4	Aspe UD	26	13	5	8	51	43	+8	44	
5	CD El Campello	26	11	6	9	37	50	−13	39	
6	CFF Maritim B	26	11	6	9	37	46	−9	39	
7	CF Històrics de València	26	11	6	9	37	31	+6	39	
8	CD Xeraco	26	11	5	10	46	59	−13	38	
9	Valencia CF C	26	10	4	12	48	38	+10	34	
10	CD Olímpic de Xàtiva	26	9	4	13	42	61	−19	31	
11	Levante UD C	26	7	8	11	30	37	−7	29	
12	Crevillente Femenino CF	26	5	10	11	32	49	−17	25	Relegation to Lower leagues
13	Torrent CF	26	3	3	20	23	61	−38	12	Relegation to Lower leagues
14	CD DRAC Castellón	26	2	2	22	14	81	−67	8	Relegation to Lower leagues

=== Top scorers ===
Rank	Player	Club	Goals
1	Iris Domínguez	CF Joventut Almassora	28
2	Eva María Navarro	Sporting Plaza de Argel	20
3	Gara González	CF Joventut Almassora	19
4	Rebeca Candela	Crevillente Femenino CF	17
5	María Alfaro	CD Xeraco	16
5	Sara Linares	CF Joventut Almassora	16
5	Sandra Orts	CF Històrics de València	16
8	Claudia Martínez	CFF Maritim B	14
9	María López	CF Joventut Almassora	12
9	Tania Sánchez	Levante UD C	12

== Region of Murcia ==
The top team was promoted to Segunda División.

Pos	Team	Pld	W	D	L	GF	GA	GD	Pts	Promotion
1	Murcia Féminas	30	27	1	2	140	26	+114	82	Promotion to Segunda División
2	Puente Tocinos Femenino	30	24	1	5	138	34	+104	73	
3	EF Dolorense	30	23	2	5	113	32	+81	71	
4	Cartagena FC - UCAM	30	22	4	4	115	30	+85	70	
5	Mar Menor CF	30	22	3	5	129	44	+85	69	
6	CD Minerva Feminas	30	21	2	7	148	66	+82	65	
7	Murcia Feminas B	30	15	1	14	87	76	+11	46	
8	AD Ceutí Feminas	30	14	2	14	67	68	−1	44	
9	Atlético Pulpileño	30	12	5	13	48	54	−6	41	
10	AD Pliego	30	12	2	16	59	88	−29	38	
11	AD El Llano	30	10	1	19	44	91	−47	31	
12	Atlético Noroeste	30	7	1	22	42	137	−95	22	
13	FC Pinatar	30	6	2	22	37	92	−55	20	
14	San Ginés Cartagena	30	5	3	22	46	131	−85	18	
15	Espinardo CF	30	2	2	26	22	145	−123	8	
16	Ciudad Jardín EF - UPCT	30	0	4	26	10	131	−121	4	

=== Top scorers ===
Rank	Player	Club	Goals
1	María José Tirado	Murcia Feminas	64
2	Francisca Requena	Mar Menor CF	63
3	María Campillo	CD Minerva	42
4	Leticia Calvo	Cartagena FC - UCAM	33
5	Noelia Rodríguez	CD Minerva	30
6	Juana María Machado	Atlético Pulpeño	29
7	Laura Díaz	Puente Tocinos	26
7	Samanta Díaz	EF Dolorense	26
9	Ainara Rodríguez	EF Dolorense	25
10	Ana Belén Mulero	CD Minerva	23
10	Violeta García	EF Dolorense	23

== Andalusia ==
The top team was promoted to Segunda División.

=== Almería ===
Pos	Team	Pld	W	D	L	GF	GA	GD	Pts
1	UDC Pavía	8	7	1	0	32	8	+24	22
2	PD Garrucha	8	4	0	4	26	14	+12	12
3	Atlético de Benahadux	8	4	0	4	20	22	−2	12
4	CD Huercal	8	3	2	3	16	13	+3	11
5	Huercalense Atlético	7	0	0	7	9	46	−37	0

==== Top scorers ====
Rank	Player	Club	Goals
1	María del Carmen Teruel	PD Garrucha	13
2	Vanesa Salinas	UDC Pavía	9
3	Laura García	Atlético de Benahadux	7
3	Ana Sánchez	UDC Pavía	7

=== Cádiz ===
Pos	Team	Pld	W	D	L	GF	GA	GD	Pts
1	Río San Pedro CD	6	3	2	1	11	9	+2	11
2	CD Guadalcacín	6	2	2	2	7	4	+3	8
3	Xerez Club Balompié	6	2	2	2	6	9	−3	8
4	CD Al-Andalus FFC	6	2	0	4	8	10	−2	6

==== Top scorers ====
Rank	Player	Club	Goals
1	Marina Ramírez	Río San Pedro CD	8
2	Leticia Sánchez and Lourdes Rodríguez	CD Al-Andalus FFC	2
2	Lourdes Rodríguez and Milagros Paz	GD Guadalcacín	2
2	Sandra Mañuelo	Río San Pedro CD	2

=== Córdoba ===
Pos	Team	Pld	W	D	L	GF	GA	GD	Pts
1	CD Pozoalbense Femenino	14	13	1	0	96	17	+79	40
2	Atlético Menciano	14	11	2	1	66	17	+49	35
3	AD El Naranjo B	14	7	1	6	34	26	+8	22
4	El carpio CF	14	7	0	7	44	24	+20	21
5	Femenino Paquillo Morreno CD	14	6	2	6	28	27	+1	20
6	Atlético Palma del Río	14	6	1	7	37	34	+3	19
7	Las Palmeras UD	14	2	1	11	19	50	−31	7
8	Prieguense AF	14	0	0	14	2	131	−129	0

==== Top scorers ====
Rank	Player	Club	Goals
1	Inmaculada Reina	Atlético Menciano	32
2	Andrea Fernández	CD Pozoalbense Femenino	28
3	María del Mar Villarreal	CD Pozoalbense Femenino	19
4	Sandra Mañuelo	CD Pozoalbense Femenino	13
5	Victoria Arévalo	CD Pozoalbense Femenino	11
5	María Bautista	Femenino Paquillo Moreno CD	11

=== Granada ===
Pos	Team	Pld	W	D	L	GF	GA	GD	Pts
1	Monachil 2013 CF	22	19	2	1	136	17	+119	59
2	Arenas de Armilla CD	22	17	3	2	96	10	+86	54
3	Celtic CF	22	14	3	5	92	23	+69	45
4	Granada CF B	22	14	2	6	91	28	+63	44
5	CD Cultural Motril	22	13	2	7	71	30	+41	41
6	UD Maracena	22	11	2	9	73	33	+40	35
7	CD Baza	22	11	0	11	69	42	+27	33
8	CD Joaquina	22	9	3	10	50	39	+11	30
9	CD Unión Deportiva Castell	22	6	3	13	47	56	−9	21
10	Peña Deportiva La Herradura	22	4	0	18	29	112	−83	12
11	UD Alhameña	22	4	0	18	20	166	−146	12
12	CD Nazarí CF	22	0	0	22	6	224	−218	0

==== Top scorers ====
Rank	Player	Club	Goals
1	Rocío Jiménez	Celtic CF	35
3	Edith Blanquez	CD Baza	34
3	María Dolores Estévez	CD Cultural Motril	30
4	María del Carmen Lafuente	Monachil 2013 CF	28
5	Carla Sigüenza	Monachil 2013 CF	21
6	Elena María Rivas	Granada CF	18
7	Paula Martín	Monachil 2013 CF	17

=== Huelva ===
Pos	Team	Pld	W	D	L	GF	GA	GD	Pts
1	CD Amigos 80 CF	8	7	1	0	56	10	+46	22
2	Pérez Cubillas AD	8	6	1	1	31	12	+19	19
3	CDFB El Campillo	8	4	0	4	31	25	+6	12
4	La Palma CF	8	1	1	6	19	41	−22	4
5	Sporting de Huelva C	8	0	1	7	15	64	−49	1

==== Top scorers ====
Rank	Player	Club	Goals
1	Maite Romero	CD Amigos 80 CF	14
2	Iris García	Pérez Cubillas AD	11
3	Ana María Rius	CDFB El Campillo	10
4	Carmen Bravo	CD Amigos 80 CF	8
4	Inmaculada Ortega	CD Amigos 80 CF	8

=== Jaén ===
Football-7

Pos	Team	Pld	W	D	L	GF	GA	GD	Pts
1	EMD Villacarrillo	16	15	0	1	122	11	+111	45
2	FCF Atlético Jiennense	16	15	0	1	128	14	+114	45
3	CD Ciudad de Torredonjimeno	16	11	1	4	83	26	+57	34
4	CD Linares CF 2001	16	10	1	5	70	34	+36	31
5	CB Úbeda	16	8	0	8	66	58	+8	24
6	Villanueva Arzobispo EM	16	5	0	11	31	55	−24	15
7	Beas de Segura CD	16	2	3	11	36	87	−51	9
8	Mancha Real AD	16	2	2	12	30	101	−71	8
9	Jodar EM	16	0	1	15	13	193	−180	1

==== Top scorers ====
Rank	Player	Club	Goals
1	Laura Sánchez	EMD Villacarrillo	59
2	Tamara Robles	Atlético Jienense	30
3	Carolina Romero	Atlético Jienense	25
4	Juana M. Cobo	CD Linares CF 2001	16
4	María I. Martos	CD Ciudad de Torrendonjimeno	16

=== Málaga ===
Pos	Team	Pld	W	D	L	GF	GA	GD	Pts
1	Atlético Málaga B	26	22	1	3	120	19	+101	67
2	El Palo	26	19	4	3	100	15	+85	61
3	CD ASD Pablo Picasso CF	26	17	3	6	74	34	+40	54
4	CD Benalmádena	26	17	2	7	60	33	+27	53
5	UD Mortadelo	26	16	5	5	53	32	+21	53
6	Puerto de la Torre	26	15	5	6	48	20	+28	50
7	Atlético Estación	26	10	3	13	45	60	−15	33
8	FB Torreño	26	9	6	11	55	50	+5	33
9	CD Mijas	26	7	4	15	30	64	−34	25
10	CD Rincón	26	6	4	16	33	83	−50	22
11	Antequera CF	26	6	4	16	49	73	−24	22
12	CD Torrox	26	4	2	20	27	119	−92	14
13	Candor CF	26	4	1	21	20	112	−92	13
14	Juventud Fuengirola CF	16	7	2	7	44	43	+1	23
15	Santa Rosalía UD	0	0	0	0	0	0	0	0

==== Top scorers ====
Rank	Player	Club	Goals
1	Ainhoa Valle	El Palo CD	25
2	Yurena Celestino	Atlético Málaga	20
3	Sarai Santiago	CD ASD Pablo Picasso	19
4	Raquel Gil	Atlético Málaga	18
5	Ainhoa Galean	El Palo CD	16
5	María del Carmen Maese	Atlético Málaga	16

=== Sevilla ===
Pos	Team	Pld	W	D	L	GF	GA	GD	Pts
1	Ciudad Alcalá CF	20	18	1	1	79	12	+67	55
2	CD Honeyball F. Menta	20	15	3	2	54	15	+39	48
3	Azahar CF	20	12	5	3	46	22	+24	41
4	CD Híspalis	20	12	4	4	60	27	+33	40
5	CD Atlético Porvenir	20	9	5	6	40	22	+18	32
6	Atlético Libertad	20	9	3	8	42	36	+6	30
7	CD Utrera	20	8	3	9	35	39	−4	27
8	Coria CF	20	7	2	11	38	47	−9	23
9	La Motilla CF	20	3	1	16	21	75	−54	10
10	CD Montequinto	20	2	1	17	18	62	−44	7
11	Marchena Balompié	20	1	0	19	14	90	−76	3

==== Top scorers ====
Rank	Player	Club	Goals
1	Sarai Vela	Ciudad Alcalá CF	16
2	Manuela Mirá	Azahar CF	15
3	Carolina De Los Santos	CD Hispalis	14
4	Ana María Munzón	CD Honeyball F. Menta	13
5	Nieves Galán	Coria CF	10
5	María del Carmen Laluz	CD Atlético Porvenir	10

== Extremadura ==
The top team was promoted to Segunda División.

=== Group 1 ===
Pos	Team	Pld	W	D	L	GF	GA	GD	Pts
1	Santa Teresa CD B	16	13	3	0	78	9	+69	42
2	EF Peña El Valle	23	16	3	4	55	17	+38	51
3	Juventud UVA	16	8	3	5	45	17	+28	27
4	CFF Badajoz & Olivenza B	16	8	3	5	57	27	+30	27
5	CD Quintana	16	8	2	6	42	39	+3	26
5	AD llerense	16	8	2	6	39	39	0	26
7	Santa Teresa CD C	16	4	3	9	27	34	−7	15
8	Extremadura FCF B	16	2	5	9	30	63	−33	11
9	FMD Zafra	16	0	0	16	15	143	−128	0

==== Top scorers ====
Rank	Player	Club	Goals
1	María Coral Ramírez		30
2	María del Pilar Alberca	Juventud UVA	18
2	María Dolores Reyman	Santa Teresa CD	18
4	Sheila Fernández	EF Peña El Valle	16
4	Alicia Jaén	CFF Badajoz & Olivenza "B	16
6	Alejandra Benítez	CD Quintana	14
6	Antonia Ramos	CD Quintana	14

=== Group 2 ===
Pos	Team	Pld	W	D	L	GF	GA	GD	Pts
1	CFF Cáceres B	14	13	1	0	57	7	+50	40
2	CP Moraleja	14	9	4	1	48	13	+35	31
3	AD Mérida Femenino	14	8	1	5	47	36	+11	25
4	CD Ciconia Negra B	14	5	6	3	30	21	+9	21
5	AD La Bellota Deportiva	14	4	5	5	30	32	−2	17
6	Don Benito Balompié AD	14	4	1	9	24	49	−25	13
7	CF Trujillo	14	1	0	13	8	59	−51	3
8	UD La Cruz Villanovense B	14	1	4	9	20	47	−27	7

==== Top scorers ====
Rank	Player	Club	Goals
1	Rocío Cabrera	AD Mérida Femenino	17
2	María Ferreria	CP Moraleja	12
3	Helena Afán	Don Benito Balompié AD	11
3	Celia Cordero	CP Moraleja Cahersa	11
5	Laura Victoria Lunar	AD Mérida Femenino	9

=== Promotion ===
Quarterfinals
1	CFF Badajoz & Olivenza B	0	0	0
8	CFF Cáceres B	3	3	6
4	Juventud UVA	0	1	1
5	CP Moraleja	1	2	3
2	AD Mérida Femenino	0	1	1
7	EF Peña El Valle	3	5	8
3	CD Ciconia Negra	0	0	0
6	Santa Teresa CD B	5	3	8

Semifinals
CFF Cáceres B	2
CP Moraleja	1
EF Peña El Valle	2
Santa Teresa CD B	1

Final
CFF Cáceres B	2
EF Peña El Valle	0

Top scorer: Irene Martínez (Santa Teresa CD B), Lidia Santos and Sheila Fernández (EF Peña El Valle): 3 goals

== Castile-La Mancha ==
The top team was promoted to Segunda División.

Pos	Team	Pld	W	D	L	GF	GA	GD	Pts	Promotion
1	CD Guadamur Femenino	37	33	2	2	164	18	+146	101	Promotion to Segunda División
2	Daimiel Racing Club	38	33	1	4	137	26	+111	100	
3	CDE Pozo de las Nieves	47	31	4	12	155	26	+129	97	
4	CDB Miguelturreño Feminas	42	28	5	9	110	34	+76	89	
5	CD Amistades Guadalajara	53	27	6	20	114	42	+72	87	
6	EFD Quintanar del Rey	47	24	3	20	89	48	+41	75	
7	CD Independiente Alcazar	33	21	3	9	83	63	+20	66	
8	EMF Fuensalida	30	19	1	10	67	58	+9	58	
9	Fundación Guadalajara	42	17	3	22	94	93	+1	54	
10	CDE Al-Basit B	23	14	5	4	62	71	−9	47	
11	FF La Solana B	39	13	7	19	41	53	−12	46	
12	Fundación Albacete B	21	13	4	4	56	85	−29	43	
13	CDE Salesianos	23	13	3	7	56	121	−65	42	
14	CD Ciudad Real	18	10	2	6	74	115	−41	32	
15	Atlético Tomelloso	28	7	9	12	40	69	−29	30	
16	CFF Albacete B	38	9	4	25	19	105	−86	31	
17	Dínamo Guadalajara B	25	13	5	7	56	109	−53	44	
18	CD Cultural Torrueña	19	10	3	6	74	157	−83	33	
19	EFUD Albacer	38	1	2	35	64	141	−77	5	
20	CFF Talavera	37	15	4	18	60	67	−7	49	

=== Top scorers ===
Rank	Player	Club	Goals
1	Paula Hernández	CDE Pozo de las Nieves	45
2	Noelia Albaldea	Daimiel Racing Club	41
3	Neila Alarcón	CDE Pozo de las Nieves	38
4	Lucía Delgado	Fundación Albacete B	37
5	Sara Buitrago	Daimiel Racing Club	33
6	Beatriz Marín	EFD Quintanar del Rey	29
7	Melody Díaz	CD Amistades Guadalajara	28
8	Geovanna Estefanía Martínez	CD Amistades Guadalajara	23
9	Lucía Díez	CD Cultural Torrueña	22
9	Jessica Huete	CDB Miguelturreño	22
9	María Gómez	CDE Guadamur Femenino	22

== Community of Madrid ==
The top team was promoted to Segunda División.

Pos	Team	Pld	W	D	L	GF	GA	GD	Pts	Promotion
1	Atlético Madrid Féminas C	34	28	4	2	156	22	+134	88	
2	Vallecas CF	34	28	3	3	161	30	+131	87	Promotion to Segunda División
3	UD Tres Cantos	34	26	4	4	136	29	+107	82	
4	Madrid CFF B	34	26	3	5	138	38	+100	81	
5	CD Samper	34	21	6	7	102	41	+61	69	
6	CDE Magerit	34	21	3	10	102	57	+45	66	
7	EFF Alcobendas	34	18	5	11	108	49	+59	59	
8	Olímpico de Moratalaz EF B	34	18	4	12	91	83	+8	58	
9	Las Rozas CF	34	12	6	16	43	59	−16	42	
10	CD Móstoles	34	11	7	16	60	73	−13	40	
11	CF Pozuelo de Alarcón B	34	11	5	18	41	65	−24	38	
12	Racing Parla CD	34	11	3	20	54	102	−48	36	
13	Spartac de Manoteras	34	8	9	17	32	56	−24	33	
14	AD y Cultural Pinto	34	8	5	21	54	125	−71	29	
15	CF Inter de Valdemoro	34	7	6	21	38	86	−48	27	
16	Camarma CF	34	6	5	23	34	115	−81	23	Relegation to Lower leagues
17	CD Seseña FB	34	3	5	26	29	139	−110	14	Relegation to Lower leagues
18	Atlético Torrejón de Ardoz	34	0	3	31	19	229	−210	3	Relegation to Lower leagues

=== Top scorers ===
Rank	Player	Club	Goals
1	Ángeles Del Alamo	Vallecas CF	45
2	Cristina Anaya	UD Tres Cantos	41
3	María Rojas	Vallecas CF	32
4	Cristina María Alonso	CDE Magerit	27
5	Elisa Estrada	Olímpico de Moratalaz EF B	26
6	Yarima Font	Vallecas CF	24
6	Belén Peralta	Madrid CFF	24
8	Cecilia Antón	CDE Magerit	23
8	Elena Pradilla	Atlético de Madrid C	23
10	Marta Gómez de Figueroa	Atlético de Madrid C	22

== Ceuta ==
Fútbol-8

Pos	Team	Pld	W	D	L	GF	GA	GD	Pts
1	IES Luís de Camoens	10	7	2	1	31	8	+23	23
2	Rayo de Ceuta	10	7	2	1	53	8	+45	23
3	Ceuta United	10	7	1	2	27	22	+5	22
4	CB Camoens Ceuta	10	3	1	6	12	22	−10	10
5	Polillas Atlético	10	1	2	7	8	19	−11	5
6	CD Colegio San Daniel	10	1	0	9	6	58	−52	3

== See also ==
Ligas Regionales (Spanish women's football)
