= Joel Brinkley =

American journalist

- Born: Joel Graham Brinkley; July 22, 1952; Washington, D.C.
- Died: March 11, 2014 (aged 61); Washington, D.C.
- Education: University of North Carolina at Chapel Hill
- Occupations: Journalist, professor
- Spouse: Sabra Chartrand (m. 1990)
- Relatives: David Brinkley (father); Alan Brinkley (brother)

Joel Graham Brinkley (July 22, 1952 – March 11, 2014) was an American journalist. He taught in the journalism program at Stanford University from 2006 until 2013, after a 23-year career with The New York Times. He won the Pulitzer Prize for International Reporting in 1980 and was twice a finalist for a Pulitzer Prize for Investigative Reporting.

== Early life and education ==
The son of Ann Fischer and TV news anchor David Brinkley, Joel Brinkley was born in Washington, DC in 1952. In 1975 he received a B.A. in English and journalism from the University of North Carolina at Chapel Hill. He was married and had two daughters. His brother, Alan Brinkley, was a historian and provost at Columbia University.

== Career ==
Brinkley's career began when he worked at the Associated Press in Charlotte, North Carolina. In 1975, Brinkley moved to The Richmond News Leader in Virginia where he covered local and regional government. He also covered a series of stories about the Ku Klux Klan and its leader David Duke. He moved to the Louisville Courier-Journal in 1978, where he served as a reporter, special-projects writer, editor and Washington correspondent. In 1979, he traveled to Cambodia to cover the fall of the Khmer Rouge for which he won the Pulitzer Prize for International Reporting in 1980. In 1983, he took a position in the Washington bureau of the New York Times, where he worked until 2006 as a reporter, White House correspondent, foreign correspondent, editor and bureau chief.

He was a director of the Fund for Investigative Journalism from 2001 to 2006.

In 2006, he joined Stanford University as the Hearst Visiting Professional in Residence in the Department of Communication. He taught there until December 2013, leaving to become an adviser for the Special Inspector General for Afghan Reconstruction.

Brinkley wrote a weekly op-ed column on foreign policy syndicated by Tribune Media Services. He received "more than a dozen national reporting and writing awards".

== Awards ==
- 1982 Penney-Missouri Award for Consumer Writing
- 1980 Pulitzer Prize for International Reporting

== Death ==
Brinkley died at the age of 61 at a Washington, D.C. hospital on March 11, 2014. The cause was pneumonia due to underlying leukemia. He was survived by his wife, fellow journalist Sabra Chartrand, and two daughters.

== Bibliography (books only) ==
In addition to his many newspaper articles, Brinkley wrote four books by himself, was co-author of a fifth, and wrote a chapter in another (of which his brother was an editor).

- Cambodia's Curse: The Modern History of a Troubled Land (2011, non-fiction)
- The Circus Master's Mission (fiction, 1989)
- Defining Vision: The Battle for the Future of Television (non-fiction, 1998)
- U.S. vs. Microsoft: The Inside Story of the Landmark Case (non-fiction, 2001, co-author with Steve Lohr)
- The Stubborn Strength of Yitzhak Shamir (non-fiction, 1989)
- Inside the Intifada (1989)
- chapter about George W. Bush in The American Presidency (non-fiction, 2004)
