= Frank Freidel =

American historian (1916–1993)

- Born: 1916; Brooklyn, New York, U.S.
- Died: 25 January 1993 (aged 76–77); Cambridge, Massachusetts, U.S.
- Occupation: Historian

Academic background
- Education: University of Southern California (BA, MA); University of Wisconsin–Madison (PhD)
- Doctoral advisor: William B. Hesseltine

Academic work
- Institutions: Harvard University
- Doctoral students: Alan Brinkley, Robert Morse Crunden

Frank Burt Freidel Jr. (May 22, 1916 – January 25, 1993) was an American historian, the first major biographer of former President Franklin Delano Roosevelt and one of the first scholars to work on his papers stored in the Roosevelt Library in Hyde Park, New York.

== Biography ==
Freidel was born in Brooklyn, New York of Quaker parents, Edith (Heacock) and Frank Burt Freidel. He was raised in Plattsburgh, New York and parts of Southern California as his father struggled to support the family during the Great Depression. He received his B.A. (1937) and M.A. (1939) from the University of Southern California, then pursued his Ph.D. from the University of Wisconsin-Madison, under the direction of William B. Hesseltine, graduating in 1942. His doctoral thesis was on 19th-century jurist Francis Lieber. His contemporaries at Wisconsin included Richard N. Current and T. Harry Williams, who later collectively authored with Freidel a U.S. history textbook, A History of the United States, dedicated to Hesseltine. His first academic appointment was in 1941 to Shurtleff College.

Freidel married twice, divorced once, and had eight children.

After years spent wandering to Shurtleff College, the University of Maryland, Pennsylvania State University, Vassar College, the University of Illinois, Urbana-Champaign, and Stanford University (1953), Freidel joined the faculty of Harvard University in 1955, and remained there until his retirement in 1981; in 1972 he was appointed the Charles Warren Professor of History. He served on the Department of the Army Historical Advisory Committee in 1973–1976. Following his retirement from Harvard, Freidel joined the department of history at the University of Washington, where he was [Bullitt Professor of History] in 1981–1986.

At various times Freidel was president of the Organization of American Historians, the New England History Teachers' Association, and the New England Historical Association.

Freidel's magnum opus was his 5-volume biography of Franklin Delano Roosevelt: "The Apprenticeship" (1952), "The Ordeal" (1954), "The Triumph" (1956), "F.D.R. and the South" (1965), and "Launching the New Deal" (1973). After publishing a one-volume condensed biography Franklin D. Roosevelt: A Rendezvous with Destiny in 1990, Freidel died in Cambridge, Massachusetts in 1993 of pneumonia and cancer while living in Belmont, Massachusetts, leaving the sixth volume unfinished.

== Awards and Prizes ==
- 1964 Guggenheim Fellowship for Humanities
- 1966-1967 President of the New England Historical Association
- 1975-1976 President of the Organization of American Historians

== Bibliography ==
- Francis Lieber: Nineteenth Century Liberal) (1947)
- Franklin D. Roosevelt: The Apprenticeship (1952)
- Franklin D. Roosevelt: The Ordeal (1954)
- Franklin D. Roosevelt: The Triumph (1956)
- Splendid Little War (1958)
- A History of the United States (2 vols.) (with Richard N. Current and T. Harry Williams) (Knopf, 1959)
- America in the Twentieth Century (1960) (with Alan Brinkley)
- A History of the United States (Since 1865) (with Richard N. Current and T. Harry Williams) (1960)
- American History: A Survey (with Richard N. Current, T. Harry Williams, and Alan Brinkley) (1961)
- A History of the United States to 1877 (with Richard N. Current and T. Harry Williams (1964)
- F.D.R. and the South (1965)
- Franklin D. Roosevelt: Launching the New Deal (1973) ISBN 9780316293037
- The Harvard Guide to American History, Revised Edition (assisted by Richard K. Showman) (January 1974) ISBN 9780674375604
- Franklin D. Roosevelt: A Rendezvous with Destiny (1990) ISBN 9780316292603
- The Presidents of the United States of America (1998). Foreword by William Jefferson Clinton. ISBN 9781857594096
