= Salutary neglect =

Policy of avoiding strict enforcement of trade laws

In American history, salutary neglect was the 18th-century policy of the British Crown of avoiding the strict enforcement of parliamentary laws, especially trade laws, as long as British colonies remained loyal to the government and contributed to the economic growth of their parent country, England and then, after the Acts of Union 1707, Great Britain. The term was first used in 1775 by Edmund Burke.

Until the late 17th century, mercantilist ideas were gaining force in England and giving general shape to trade policy through a series of Navigation Acts. From the collapse of the centralized Dominion of New England in 1689 until the end of the French and Indian War in 1763, salutary neglect was in effect. Afterwards, Britain began to try to enforce stricter rules and more direct management, which included the disallowment of laws to go into effect that were passed in colonial legislatures. This eventually contributed significantly as a motivation and justification for the American Revolution.

== Origins ==
The colonies had a certain level of autonomy early on. For around the first fifty years, the Massachusetts Bay Colony functioned in a quasi-independent status. After the Restoration, King Charles tried to enforce royal control over the colonies, especially Roundhead New England. The Royal Commission of 1664 was the first attempt to increase royal control. In 1679, King Charles partioned Massachusetts into the Province of New Hampshire and in 1682 imposed Edward Cranfield as the first royally appointed governor in all of New England. During the establishment of the Dominion of New England, which was implemented in part to enforce the Navigation Acts, administration was centralized, and the colonies were presided over by the very unpopular Edmund Andros. After the Glorious Revolution, the 1689 Boston revolt, and the removal of Andros, the colonies could return to an informal state of local ruling bodies insulated by certain boundaries from England. The policy was later formalised by Robert Walpole after he took the position of Lord Commissioner of the Treasury in 1721 and worked with Thomas Pelham-Holles, 1st Duke of Newcastle. In an effort to increase tax income, Walpole relaxed the enforcement of trade laws and decreased regulations on the grounds that "if no restrictions were placed on the colonies, they would flourish".

Walpole did not believe in enforcing the Navigation Acts, which had been established under Oliver Cromwell and Charles II and required goods traded between Britain and its colonies to be carried on English ships as part of the larger economic strategy of mercantilism.

The policy went unnamed until the term was coined in Edmund Burke's "Speech on Conciliation with America," which was given in the House of Commons on March 22 1775. The speech praised the governance of the British America, which, "through a wise and salutary neglect," had achieved great commercial success:

When I know that the colonies in general owe little or nothing to any care of ours, and that they are not squeezed into this happy form by the constraints of watchful and suspicious government, but that, through a wise and salutary neglect, a generous nature has been suffered to take her own way to perfection; when I reflect upon these effects, when I see how profitable they have been to us, I feel all the pride of power sink, and all presumption in the wisdom of human contrivances melt and die away within me.

== Effects ==
The policy succeeded in increasing the flow of money among Britain and its colonies. The lack of enforcement of trading laws meant American merchants profited from illegal trading with French possessions in the Caribbean from which Britain prospered, in turn, as American merchants purchased more British goods.

The laissez-faire nature of the policy led to the colonies being de facto independent. The policy helped develop a sense of independence and self-sufficiency and enabled colonial assemblies to wield significant power over the royally-appointed governors through their control of colony finances.

Additionally, Walpole's willingness to fill the unpopular colonial offices with friends and political allies led to an ineffective king's authority overseas.

=== West Indies ===
The practice of a high degree of local autonomy was not limited to British colonies on the North American mainland. The island colonies in the Caribbean also enjoyed autonomy in their local legislatures.

== End of policy ==
From 1763, Britain began to try to enforce stricter rules and more direct management, which were driven in part by the outcome of the Seven Years' War in which Britain had gained large swathes of new territory in North America at the Treaty of Paris. The war meant that Britain had accrued large debts, and it was decided to deploy troops in the colonies to defend them from the continued threats from France.

British Prime Minister George Grenville thus proposed additional taxes to supplement the Navigation Acts that known as the Grenville Acts: the Sugar Act 1764, the Currency Act 1764, and the Stamp Act 1765 all aimed at increasing authority in and revenue from the colonies. These were unpopular in the colonies and led to the Stamp Act riots in August 1765 and the Boston Massacre in March 1770. The Grenville Acts, as well as the Intolerable Acts, were defining factors that led to the American Revolutionary War.

== Deliberateness of policy ==
To what extent "salutary neglect" constituted an actual neglect of colonial affairs, as the name suggests, or a conscious policy of the British government is controversial among historians, and it also varies with national perspective. Americans may side with Burke on the "salutary" effect of the policy by emphasizing the economic and social development of the colonies, but from a British imperial perspective it was a momentous failure, and debate remains as to its true social, economic, and political effects.

The Board of Trade, which enforced mercantilist legislation in the United Kingdom, was too weak to enforce its own laws until 1748. Thomas Pelham-Holles, 1st Duke of Newcastle, became the relevant Secretary of State in 1724 but took time to learn the duties of his office, and even then, he was not firm in his action, which caused the historian James Henretta to blame salutary neglect on "administrative inefficiency, financial stringency, and political incompetence."
