= Huey Long (book) =

1969 biography by T. Harry Williams

- Title page for Huey Long (1969)
- Author: T. Harry Williams
- Language: English
- Subject: Huey Long
- Genre: Biography
- Publication date: 1969
- Publication place: United States

Huey Long (1969) is a biography of Louisiana Governor and US Senator Huey Long written by historian T. Harry Williams. The work was well received, winning a Pulitzer Prize and a National Book Award.

== Writing ==
Williams spent 12 years writing and researching Huey Long in order to write the 896-page work. Due to the lack of documents regarding Long, Williams collected oral history. Beginning in 1955, Williams interviewed those who had known Long. He outlined his work in a 1959 address to the Southern Historical Association.

The work is sympathetic to Long, painting him as a tragic figure and emphasizing his leftist leanings over his often claimed fascist tendencies. According to Kirkus Reviews, Williams "made pretty darn sure that his is going to be the definitive biography of Long." Williams reportedly regarded Huey Long as "the ultimate writing endeavor of his life."

== Critical reception ==
The work was a popular bestseller and well-received by critics. In addition to garnering Williams the National Book Award for History and Biography, the work won the 1970 Pulitzer Prize for Biography or Autobiography.
