= Betoño Sports Complex =

Football training ground in Vitoria-Gasteiz, Spain

- El Glorioso
- Interactive map of Betoño Sports Complex
- Former names: Michelin sports grounds
- Location: Vitoria-Gasteiz; Álava, Basque Country, Spain
- Coordinates: 42.8623938°N 2.6524563°W
- Owner: Vitoria-Gasteiz City Council
- Type: Football training facility

Construction
- Opened: 1970; 56 years ago

Tenants
- CD Betoño-Elgorriaga; Deportivo Alavés (training)

The Betoño Sports Complex (Spanish: Complejo Deportivo de Betoño, Basque: Betoñu Kirol Esparrua), also known as El Glorioso, is a football training ground and match venue located in the city of Vitoria-Gasteiz, Álava (Basque Country).

== Facilities ==
The complex is situated to the east of Vitoria city centre, adjacent to the village of the same name and close to the Salburua wetlands reserve. As of 2018, the facilities for 11-a-side football consisted of three full-size grass pitches (one with a basic covered and seated stand for around 188 spectators) and one artificial turf pitch, and associated changing areas.

== History of the site ==
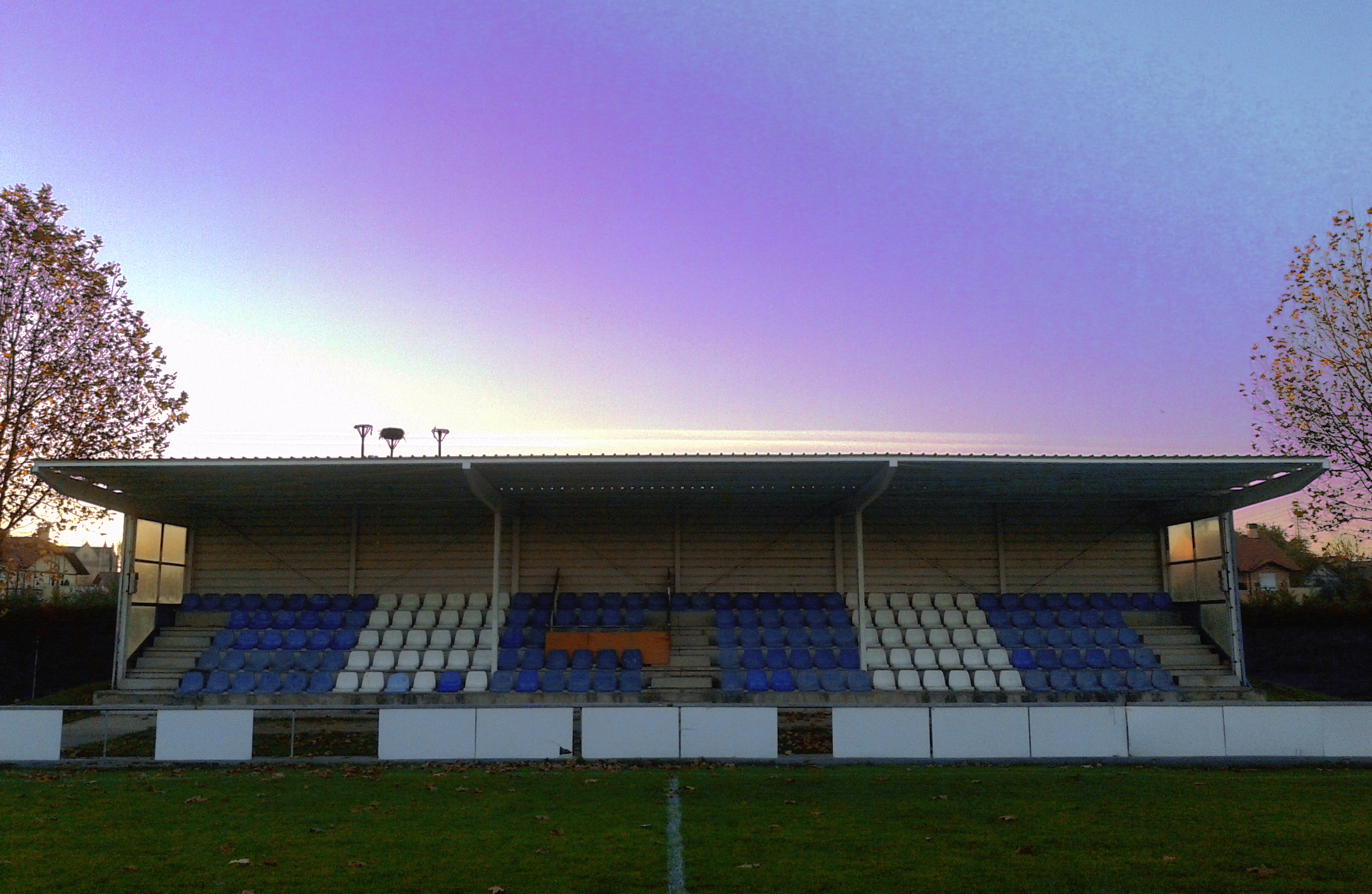
Stand at Betoño, 2015

The 17,000m² complex was originally the recreation grounds of the Michelin tyre company who have a large factory in the area; their other factory in Lasarte-Oria had a football team which reached the Spanish third tier in the 1970s.

The facilities were used extensively by Deportivo Alavés for many years before being purchased by the club, upgraded and renamed El Glorioso ('The Glorious', referencing one of their nicknames) in 2001. Betoño became the home ground for the Alavés B-team and C-team who at that time were competing in the third and fourth tiers of the Spanish football league system. However, the club's fortunes declined rapidly under the ownership of Dmitry Piterman, with the senior team falling to the third level, the B-team to the fifth and the C-team disbanding, and in 2006 Vitoria-Gasteiz city council reacquired control of the facility.

Since then, many smaller teams have trained regularly or played their home fixtures there, including CD Betoño-Elgorriaga, Gasteizko Neskak (a women's club whose senior squad was merged into a new Alavés female team in 2017) and, until 2015, CD Vitoria. As of 2016–17, the various age group teams of Alavés have been holding training sessions at Betoño, having secured a deal for the exclusive use of one of the pitches, although the club also has a dedicated training facility of a similar size, Ciudad Deportiva José Luis Compañón (also known by its location, 'Ibaia'), to the south-west of the city.

== Future developments ==
Since becoming owner of Alavés in 2013, Josean Querejeta forged close links between the football club and his basketball team Saski Baskonia including a joint training initiative for children (5+11 Foundation). He also stated his desire for Alavés to have an elite training facility, and this became a more urgent concern when the team were promoted to La Liga in 2016. The proximity of the Betoño grounds to Baskonia's Fernando Buesa Arena and BAKH multi-sports centre led to it being the preferred site to be developed, ahead of Ibaia which has only basic facilities and is located at an isolated site on the other side of the city. However, if Alavés were to take back full exclusive control of Betoño, the local teams based there would be without a home ground close to them. The higher land value of Betoño and its importance to amateur football in the city were considerable obstacles in the club's proposals to re-acquire ownership of the complex.

As part of a wider project involving a €50 million investment in the Alavés infrastructure and stadium jointly financed between the club and public bodies, in summer 2017 an agreement in principle over the purchase of Betoño, involving an annual fee to the city until 2020 when a land purchase fee of €6 million would be paid, accompanied by a proposal for the local teams to have use of Ibaia for their matches, appeared to have been reached in summer 2017, but some months later this became less certain when the price of the land involved, including the former Michelin factory adjacent to the sports complex, was set at €16 million by the city council, prompting Alavés to release an alternative plan to purchase farmland to the east of the Buesa Arena, outside the city limits of Vitoria-Gasteiz.
