= Betoño =

Village in Álava, Spain

- Concejo
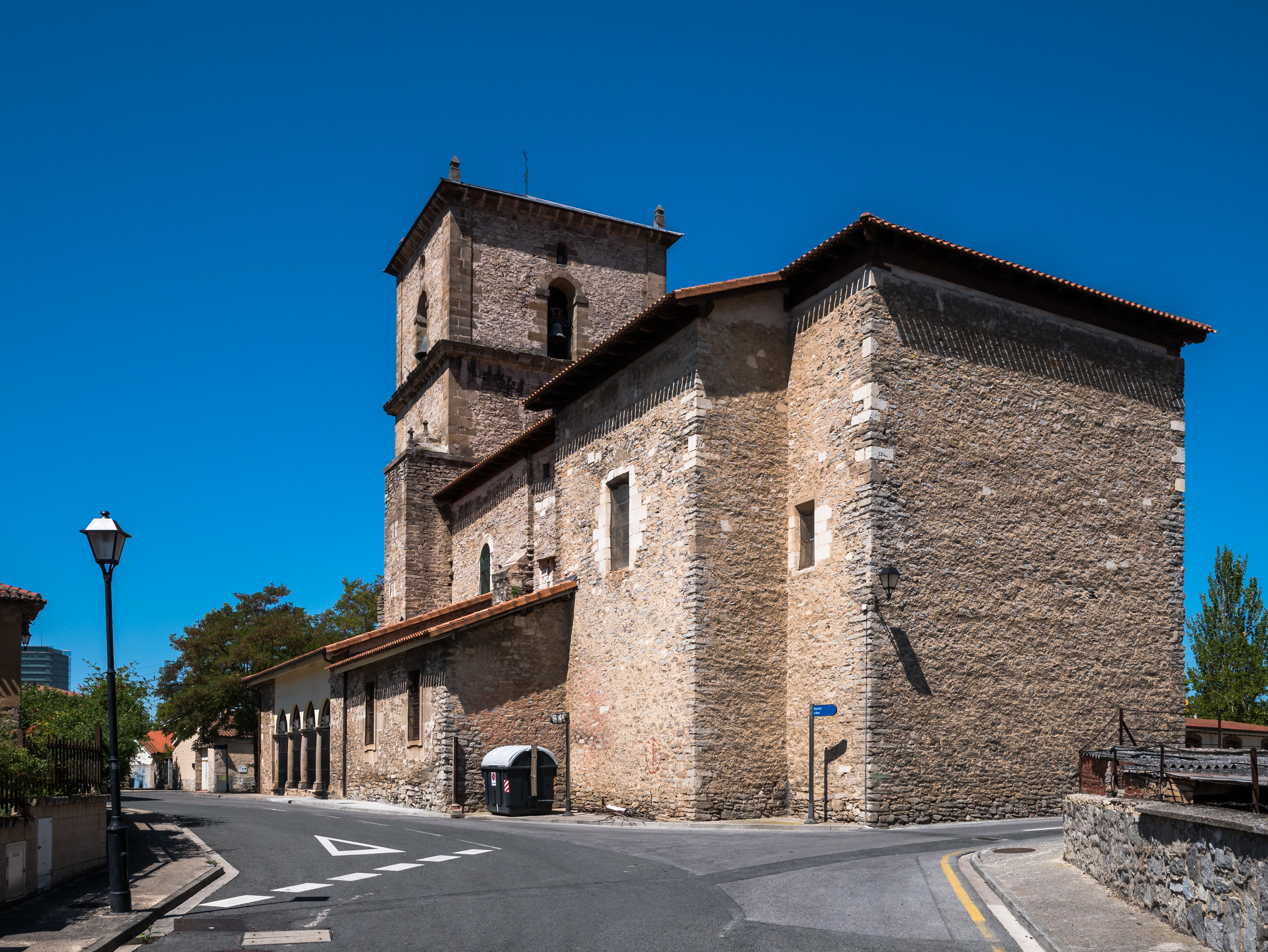
- Church of Betoño

- Coat of arms

- Location within Álava Location within the Basque Country Location within Spain
- Coordinates: 42.8622°N 2.6556°W
- Country: Spain
- Autonomous community: Basque Country
- Province: Álava
- Comarca: Vitoria-Gasteiz
- Municipality: Vitoria-Gasteiz
- Elevation: 511 m (1,677 ft)

Population (2023)
  - Total: 464
- Postal code: 01013

Betoño (Basque: Betoñu) is a village in Álava, Basque Country, Spain. It is located to the north-east of the Vitoria-Gasteiz city center.

Betoño gives its name to a nearby industrial estate which contains a large Michelin tyre factory, and to Betoño Sports Complex, used for training and matches by many of the football clubs in the area, including the local professional club Deportivo Alavés. The Salburua wetlands and the Fernando Buesa Arena (Saski Baskonia basketball team) lie to the east of Betoño.
