= Benjamin Arthur Quarles =

American historian (1904–1996)

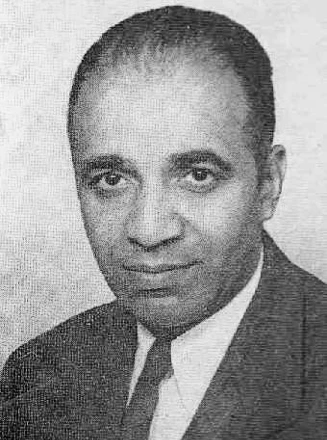
- Quarles c. 1948
- Born: January 23, 1904; Boston, Massachusetts. U.S.
- Died: November 16, 1996 (aged 92); Baltimore, Maryland, U.S.
- Education: B.A., M.A., PhD
- Alma mater: Shaw University; University of Wisconsin–Madison
- Occupation: History professor
- Spouse(s): Vera Bullock (1951); Ruth Brett (1996)
- Children: Pamela Quarles; Roberta Quarles
- Writing career
- Notable work: The Negro in the Making of America
- Notable awards: Rosenwald Fellowship (1938, 1945), Carnegie Corporation Advancement Teaching Fellowship (1944), Social Science Research Council Fellowship (1957), Guggenheim Fellowship (1959), Smithsonian Institution's National Museum of American History Lifetime Achievement Award (1996)

Benjamin Arthur Quarles (January 23, 1904 – November 16, 1996) was an American historian, administrator, educator, and writer, whose scholarship centered on Black American social and political history. Major books by Quarles include The Negro in the Civil War (1953), The Negro in the American Revolution (1961), Lincoln and the Negro (1962), and Black Abolitionists (1969). He demonstrated that Black people were active participants in major conflicts and issues of American history. His books were narrative accounts of critical wartime periods that focused on how Black people interacted with their white allies and emphasized Blacks' acting as vital agents of change rather than receiving favors from whites.

== Background ==
Quarles was born in Boston, Massachusetts, in 1904. His parents were Margaret (O'Brien), a homemaker, and Arthur Benedict Quarles, a subway porter. As a boy, Benjamin went to local public schools.

In his twenties, Quarles enrolled at Shaw University, the first historically Black college in the South, in Raleigh, North Carolina, and received his B.A. degree in 1931. He earned his M.A. degree from the University of Wisconsin–Madison in 1933, and a Ph.D. from there in 1940. Initially he faced resistance for wanting to write Black history but finally received support for his goal. He learned his writing style from Professor William B. Hesseltine.

He returned to Shaw, working as an instructor of history (1935–39). He next taught at Dillard University (1939–1953) in New Orleans, Louisiana. There he became a full professor and also served as dean. His last appointment was as professor of history and chair of the department at Morgan State University, Baltimore, Maryland (1953–1974). After Quarles's official retirement in 1969, he was awarded professor emeritus status and kept teaching for several years.

Quarles was an active member of many political and historical organizations, such as Project Advisory Committee on Black Congress Members, the committee to oversee the founding of the Amistad Center at Tulane University, the Department of the Army Historical Advisory Committee, and the American Council of Learned Societies. He was one of the few men in the profession who openly supported the founding of the Association of Black Women Historians.

== Author ==
A prolific writer, Benjamin Quarles published 10 books, 23 articles, and hundreds of shorter pieces of various sorts. In his writings, he explored in detail the contributions made by the Black soldiers and abolitionists of the American Revolutionary War (1775–1783) and the American Civil War (1861–1865). His essays in the Mississippi Valley Historical Review in 1945 and 1959 were the first by a Black historian to be published in a major historical journal.

His books include:

- Frederick Douglass (1948) (published dissertation)
- The Negro in the Civil War (1953)
- The Negro in the American Revolution (1961)
- Lincoln and the Negro (1962)
- The Negro in the Making of America (3rd edition, "revised, updated, and expanded", 1987) [1964]
- Frederick Douglass, edited by Benjamin Quarles (1968) (Great Lives Observed)
- Black Abolitionists (1969)
- Blacks on John Brown, edited by Benjamin Quarles (1972)
- Allies for Freedom: Blacks and John Brown (1974)
- Black Mosaic: Essays in Afro-American History and Historiography (1988)
  - Blight, David W. "The Restoration of Black History: Benjamin Quarles and the Paradox of Race". Review of Black Mosaic: Essays in Afro-American History and Historiography. Reviews in American History, Vol. 17, No. 1 (March, 1989), pp. 152-158.

== Legacy and honors ==
Quarles died in 1996 of a heart attack at the age of 92.

- 1988: Publishes Black Mosaic: Essays in Afro-American History and Historiography. Received American Historical Association's Senior Historian Scholarly Distinction Award.
- 1988: Morgan State University dedicated The Benjamin A. Quarles African-American Studies Room in the university library, as a repository for his books, manuscripts, and memorabilia.
- 1996: Receives the Smithsonian Institution's National Museum of American History Lifetime Achievement Award
- 2013: Quarles was inducted into the Great Blacks in Wax Museum, Inc. in Baltimore.
- Dr. Benjamin Quarles Place, a short downtown residential street just west of Martin Luther King Jr. Blvd. in Baltimore is named after Quarles.
