= Juliette Vidal =

French footballer (born 1999)

Personal information
- Full name: Juliette Angèle Vidal
- Date of birth: 21 March 1999 (age 27)
- Place of birth: Lille, France
- Height: 1.76 m (5 ft 9 in)
- Position: Midfielder

Team information
- Current team: Alavés Gloriosas
- Number: 23

College career
Years	Team	Apps	(Gls)
2017–2018	Lander Bearcats	33	(12)
2019–2021	High Point Panthers	48	(9)

Senior career*
Years	Team	Apps	(Gls)
2022	Saint-Étienne	8	(1)
2022–2023	Basel	20	(3)
2023–2024	Anderlecht	26	(1)
2024–2026	Bayer Leverkusen	33	(0)
2026–	Alavés Gloriosas	8	(0)

International career
2015–2016	France U17	5	(0)
- * Club domestic league appearances and goals as of 31 October 2026

Juliette Angèle Vidal (born 21 March 1999) is a French footballer who plays as a midfielder for Alavés Gloriosas. Vidal previously played for Saint-Étienne, FC Basel, RSC Anderlecht and Bayer Leverkusen.

Vidal has represented France at youth levels.

== Honours ==
- Belgian Women's Super League: 2023–24
