= Ciudad Deportiva José Luis Compañón =

Training ground of Deportivo Alavés

- Ibaia
- Interactive map of Ciudad Deportiva José Luis Compañón
- Location: Vitoria-Gasteiz; Álava, Basque Country, Spain
- Coordinates: 42.832119°N 2.721115°W
- Owner: Deportivo Alavés
- Type: Football training facility

Construction
- Opened: 1982

Tenants
- Deportivo Alavés (training); Alavés B Alavés Gloriosas

The Ciudad Deportiva José Luis Compañón (José Luis Compañón Sport City / Basque: José Luis Compañón Kirol Hiria), also known as Instalaciones de Ibaia (Ibaia Facilities / Basque: Ibaia instalazioak) after the name of its semi-rural location, is the primary training ground of Spanish professional football club Deportivo Alavés, located in the city of Vitoria-Gasteiz, Álava (Basque Country).

== Facilities ==
The complex is in the Zuazo/Zuhatsu district on the south-western edge of the Vitoria-Gasteiz urban area, about 3 km west of the club's Mendizorrotza stadium. As of 2018, the facilities consisted of three full-size grass pitches and one with artificial turf, with associated changing areas and a small gymnasium.

One of these pitches is utilised as the home stadium of the club's reserve team, Alavés B, who usually play in the Tercera División (fourth tier of the Spanish football league system). The club's women's team and academy teams also usually play their fixtures at Ibaia.

In 2018, Alavés offered use of Ibaia facilities to local affiliated team San Ignacio for matches after they were promoted to the Tercera División, due to the Federation being concerned with the condition of the playing surface at the latter's usual ground Adurtzabal.

== History of the site ==
The Ibaia complex was constructed in the 1980s on land owned by the club president Juan Arregui and was modernised in 2002 during a period of success for the club, at which time the complex was renamed in memory of José Luis Compañón, a popular and long-serving Alavés director who had recently died.

In spite of grand plans to add a roof over the pitches or build a golf gourse and hotel, little additional investment was made in the training facility over the next decade which was a time of sporting and financial upheaval for the club under the chaotic stewardship of Dmitry Piterman. Complications over ownership of a section of the land (one of the football pitches and the car park) led to that portion of the complex lying unused for several years due to the costs involved, which caused problems regarding access for vehicles and space for the players to train. The dispute was eventually resolved in 2011 when a new board took over.

=== Other training sites ===
Alavés have close connections with the Betoño Sports Complex (also known as El Glorioso) in the east of the city, and owned the site between 2001 and 2006.

The club can also make use of the municipality-owned Olaranbe facilities on the south-eastern outskirts of the city which are home to CD Aurrerá de Vitoria as well as CD Vitoria, the affiliated team of rivals SD Eibar, who previously played at Betoño. Alavés made an unsuccessful attempt to purchase Olaranbe in 2017.

== Future developments ==
Since becoming owner of Alavés in 2013, Josean Querejeta forged close links between the football club and his basketball team Saski Baskonia including a joint training initiative for children (5+11 Foundation). He also stated his desire for Alavés to have an elite training facility, and this became a more urgent concern when the team were promoted to La Liga in 2016. The proximity of the Betoño grounds to Baskonia's Fernando Buesa Arena and BAKH multi-sports centre led to it being the preferred site to be developed, ahead of Ibaia which has only basic facilities and is located at an isolated site on the other side of the city.

In summer 2017 an agreement in principle over the purchase of Betoño, involving an annual fee to the city until 2020 when a land purchase fee of €6 million would be paid, accompanied by a proposal for the local teams to have use of Ibaia for their matches, appeared to have been reached in summer 2017, but some months later this became less certain when the price of the land involved, including the former Michelin factory adjacent to the sports complex, was set at €16 million by the city council.
