= Vinegar Hill Township, Jo Daviess County, Illinois =

Vinegar Hill Township
- Township
- Location in Jo Daviess County

- Jo Daviess County's location in Illinois
- Coordinates: 42°28′39″N 90°27′00″W
- Country: United States
- State: Illinois
- County: Jo Daviess
- Established: November 2, 1852

Government
  - Supervisor: James D. Purdy

Area
  - Total: 13.81 sq mi (35.8 km^{2})
  - Land: 13.81 sq mi (35.8 km^{2})
  - Water: 0 sq mi (0 km^{2}) 0%
- Elevation: 876 ft (267 m)

Population (2020)
  - Total: 398
  - Density: 28.8/sq mi (11.1/km^{2})
- Time zone: UTC-6 (CST)
  - Summer (DST): UTC-5 (CDT)
- ZIP codes: 61025, 61036
- FIPS code: 17-085-78084

Vinegar Hill Township is one of 23 townships in Jo Daviess County, Illinois, United States. As of the 2020 census, its population was 398 and it contained 151 housing units. Its name changed from Mann Township on September 18, 1857.

== Geography ==
According to the 2021 census gazetteer files, Vinegar Hill Township has a total area of 13.81 square miles (35.77 km^{2}), all land.

=== Major highways ===
- Illinois Route 84

== Demographics ==
As of the 2020 census there were 398 people, 118 households, and 103 families residing in the township. The population density was 28.83 inhabitants per square mile (11.13/km^{2}). There were 151 housing units at an average density of 10.94 per square mile (4.22/km^{2}). The racial makeup of the township was 96.73% White, 0.50% African American, 0.25% Native American, 0.50% Asian, 0.00% Pacific Islander, 2.01% from other races, and 0.00% from two or more races. Hispanic or Latino people of any race were 2.76% of the population.

There were 118 households, out of which 41.50% had children under the age of 18 living with them, 87.29% were married couples living together, 0.00% had a female householder with no spouse present, and 12.71% were non-families. 5.90% of all households were made up of individuals, and 5.90% had someone living alone who was 65 years of age or older. The average household size was 2.92 and the average family size was 3.14.

The township's age distribution consisted of 17.4% under the age of 18, 4.4% from 18 to 24, 18.5% from 25 to 44, 46.2% from 45 to 64, and 13.4% who were 65 years of age or older. The median age was 45.6 years. For every 100 females, there were 120.5 males. For every 100 females age 18 and over, there were 120.2 males.

The median income for a household in the township was $88,611, and the median income for a family was $90,521. Males had a median income of $43,977 versus $40,938 for females. The per capita income for the township was $27,422. None of the population was below the poverty line.

Historical population
Census	Pop.	Note	%±
2000	250		—
2010	364		45.6%
2020	398		9.3%
U.S. Decennial Census

== School districts ==
- Galena Unit School District 120

== Political districts ==
- Illinois' 16th congressional district
- State House District 89
- State Senate District 45

== Notable people ==
- T. Harry Williams, historian who received Pulitzer Prize; born in Vinegar Hill
