= Almudena Rivero =

Spanish footballer (born 2002)

Personal information
- Full name: Almudena Rivero Vázquez
- Date of birth: 7 March 2002 (age 24)
- Place of birth: Seville, Spain
- Height: 1.63 m (5 ft 4 in)
- Position: Defender

Team information
- Current team: Alavés
- Number: 16

Youth career
- 2016–2017: Sevilla

Senior career*
Years	Team	Apps	(Gls)
2017–2020	Sevilla B		
2018–2023	Sevilla	79	(0)
2023–	Alavés		
- * Club domestic league appearances and goals as of 15:47, 14 December 2021 (UTC)

Almudena Rivero Vázquez (born 7 March 2002) is a Spanish footballer who plays as a defender for Alavés.

== Club career ==
Rivero started her career at Sevilla's academy.
