= Julian Lim =

American historian

- Born: San Francisco Bay Area, California, United States
- Occupation: Historian

Academic background
- Education: UC Berkeley (BA); UC Berkeley School of Law (JD); Cornell University (PhD)
- Doctoral advisor: Maria Cristina Garcia

Academic work
- Institutions: Johns Hopkins University

Julian Lim is a historian teaching at Johns Hopkins University. Her research focuses on race, sovereignty, and refugee law in the Mexico-U.S. borderlands region. Her first monograph Porous Borders: Multiracial Migrations and the Law in the U.S.-Mexico Borderlands was published in 2017 by the University of North Carolina Press. The text won multiple awards, including the David J. Weber-Clements Center Prize, the Outstanding Achievement in History award from the Association for Asian American Studies, and the Humanities Book Award from the Institute for Humanities Research.

Lim was born in the San Francisco Bay Area. She attended UC Berkeley for undergrad and law school. She received her doctorate from Cornell University in 2013, where she was a student of Maria Cristina Garcia and Derek Chang. Her work has focused primarily on analyzing the racialization of Asian Pacific Americans in the United States. Lim is an active member in the Western History Association.
