= Richard N. Current =

American historian (1912–2012)

Richard Current
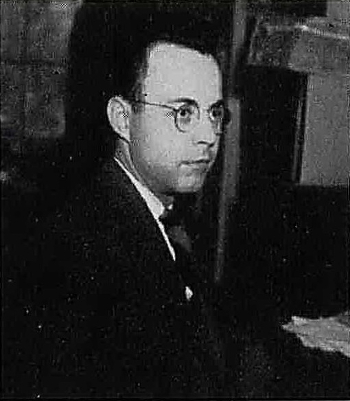
- Teaching at Lawrence University in 1947
- Born: Richard Nelson Current; October 5, 1912; Colorado City, Colorado, U.S.
- Died: October 26, 2012 (aged 100); Boston, Massachusetts, U.S.

Academic background
- Education: Fletcher School of Law and Diplomacy; University of Wisconsin–Madison; Oberlin College

Academic work
- Discipline: History
- Sub-discipline: Race relations
- Institutions: Rutgers University; Hamilton College; Northern Michigan University; Lawrence University; University of Illinois; University of North Carolina at Greensboro; University of Wisconsin–Madison

Richard Nelson Current (October 5, 1912 – October 26, 2012) was an American historian, called "the Dean of Lincoln Scholars", best known for The Lincoln Nobody Knows (1958), and Lincoln and the First Shot (1963).

== Life ==
Born in Colorado City, Colorado, Current graduated in 1934 from Oberlin College with a B.A., in 1935 from The Fletcher School of Law and Diplomacy at Tufts University with an M.A., and in 1940 from the University of Wisconsin-Madison with a PhD. At Wisconsin, he studied under William B. Hesseltine. He wrote a book titled "Old Thad Stevens: A Story of Ambition" while at the university.

In the United States, Current taught at Rutgers University, Hamilton College, Northern Michigan University, Lawrence University, Mills College, Salisbury State University, the University of Illinois, the University of North Carolina at Greensboro, and the University of Wisconsin-Madison. Internationally, he lectured in Chile, Japan, India, and Antarctica.

Current served as president of the Southern Historical Association in 1975. In addition, he was the editor of and author of introductions to many other works and published over 250 articles. His papers are in the Rare Book Room of the University of North Carolina at Greensboro.

His first wife of 45 years Rose Bonar died in 1983, and in 1984 he married Marcia Ewing, who co-wrote a biography of dancer Loie Fuller with him. His final book, a collection of translations of writings by the Norwegian author Knut Hamsun, was published in 2003.

He died in Boston, Massachusetts, on October 26, 2012, at age 100 of Parkinson's disease and was buried in Greensboro, North Carolina.

== Dean of Lincoln Scholars ==
Current came late to the study of Abraham Lincoln, having published books on 19th century political leaders Thaddeus Stevens, Daniel Webster, and John C. Calhoun, and the history of the typewriter when he was asked to complete a 4-volume biography of Lincoln begun by his University of Illinois colleague James G. Randall, who had finished three volumes before his 1953 death. Current wrote at least half of the fourth volume Lincoln the President: Midstream to the Last Full Measure (1955), which won the prestigious Bancroft Prize from Columbia University, establishing his reputation.

Drawn to what he called the "perpetual timeliness" and "eternal relevance" of Lincoln's life, Current went on to write seven more books about him. One of his most influential books was The Lincoln Nobody Knows (1958), which delved into the seemingly contradictory elements of Lincoln's life and thought, particularly his views on slavery and race, showing how he overcame the narrow thinking of his childhood in the backwoods of Kentucky and Indiana where racist and white supremacist views were common.

"The most remarkable thing about him was his tremendous power for growth", Current wrote in The Lincoln Nobody Knows. "He grew in sympathy, in the breadth of his humaneness, as he grew in other aspects of the mind and spirit. In more ways than one he succeeded in breaking through the narrow bounds of his early environment." "The awful fact of the assassination falls between us and the man. It is like a garish, bloodstained glass, in which all perspectives are distorted."

His 1963 book Lincoln and the First Shot sought to dispel many myths about Lincoln, including the theory that some of the members of his cabinet were in on the assassination conspiracy. Current described how Lincoln built a unity of purpose in the Northern states before the Civil War began in earnest, claiming that Lincoln had a more sophisticated knowledge of law, economics, and military tactics than earlier historians had believed.

== Debate with Gore Vidal ==
After Gore Vidal published his 1984 novel Lincoln, Current began a running feud in the pages of The New York Review of Books, accusing Vidal of willfully distorting the historical record, misrepresenting Lincoln's views, and "utter ignorance" of the linguistic differences between British English and American English because he spelled "jewelry" and "practice" in the British way. "He is wrong on big as well as little matters", Current commented. "Vidal simply doesn't know what he's talking about".

In response, Vidal explained that he used what was then-common agreed-upon American speech, and as a writer of novels was obliged to dramatize his story through someone's consciousness. Vidal asserted that Current never read his book in whole, that he was fault-finding, and that he could not separate a biography from a novel, "getting all tangled up in misread or misunderstood trivia". The real reason for Current's criticism, Vidal maintained, was his portrayal of Lincoln as wanting to colonize the liberated slaves in Liberia, which would go against the political correctness of the 1980s. Ironically, the source of this interpretation according to Vidal was a biography of Lincoln by Current himself.

== Awards ==
- 1956 Bancroft Prize
- 1959 Fulbright Professor in Munich, Germany
- 1960 O. Max Gardner Prize from the University of North Carolina
- 1962 Harold Vyvyan Harmsworth Professor of American History at Oxford University
- 1977 George Banta Award from the Wisconsin Library Association
- 1988 Notable Wisconsin Authors
- 1989 Logan Hay Medal from the Abraham Lincoln Association
- 2000 Lincoln Prize for lifetime achievement
- 2000 The Richard Nelson Current Award of Achievement from The Lincoln Forum

== Works ==
- Old Thad Stevens: A Story of Ambition, 1942.
- Pine Logs and Politics: A Life of Philetus Sawyer, 1816–1900, 1950.
- The Typewriter and the Men Who Made It, 1954.
- Secretary Stimson: A Study in Statecraft (Rutgers University Press, New Brunswick, N.J., 1954) read online
- Daniel Webster and the Rise of National Conservatism (1955) read online
- Lincoln the President: Last Full Measure (with James G. Randall) (1955) (Bancroft Prize) read online
- The Lincoln Nobody Knows (1958) read online
- "God and the Strongest Battalions," in Donald, David Herbert, ed., Why the North Won the Civil War, 1960.
- American History: A Survey (with Frank Freidel and T. Harry Williams), 1961.
- Lincoln and the First Shot (J. B. Lippincott & Co., New York, 1963) read online
- John C. Calhoun, 1963.
- United States History (with A. DeConde and H. L. Dante), 1967.
- Three Carpetbag Governors, 1967.
- Essentials of American History (with others) (New York: Knopf, 1972, 1980) read online
- United States History: A World Power (with A. DeConde and H. L. Dante), 1974.
- United States History: Search for Freedom (with A. DeConde and H. L. Dante), 1974.
- Wisconsin: The Civil War Era 1848–1873, 1976.
- Wisconsin: A Bicentennial History, 1977.
- Unity, Ethnicity, and Abraham Lincoln, 1978.
- A History of the United States to 1877 (with Gerald J. Goodwin and Paula Angle Franklin), 1980. First edition with T. Harry Williams and Frank Freidel, 1959.
- Speaking of Abraham Lincoln: The Man and His Meaning for Our Times, 1983.
- Northernizing the South, 1983.
- Arguing with Historians: Essays on the Historical and the Unhistorical, 1987.
- Those Terrible Carpetbaggers, 1988.
- Lincoln, the Constitution, and Presidential Leadership, 1989.
- Daniel Webster: "The Completest Man", Lebanon, New Hampshire: University Press of New England, 1990 (essays by Current and others).
- Phi Beta Kappa in American Life: The First Two Hundred Years, 1990.
- Lincoln's Loyalists: Union Soldiers from the Confederacy, Boston, Massachusetts: Northeastern University Press, 1992.
- Encyclopedia of the Confederacy (editor), 1993.
- What Is an American? Abraham Lincoln and "Multiculturalism", Milwaukee, Wisconsin: Marquette University Press, 1993.
- Lincoln on Democracy (with others), 1994.
- Loie Fuller, Goddess of Light (with Marcia Ewing Current), 1997.
- Knut Hamsun Remembers America: Essays and Stories, 1885–1949 (translator), 2003.
