= Robert M. Crunden =

American historian

- Born: December 23, 1940; Jersey City, New Jersey, U.S.
- Died: March 23, 1999 (aged 58); Austin, Texas, U.S.
- Occupation: Historian
- Children: 3 daughters

Academic background
- Education: Yale University (BA); Harvard University (PhD)
- Doctoral advisor: Frank Freidel

Academic work
- Institutions: University of Texas at Austin
- Doctoral students: Maria Cristina Garcia

Robert Morse Crunden (December 23, 1940 - March 23, 1999) was an American historian. He was a professor of American studies and history at the University of Texas at Austin, and the author of many books.

== Early life ==
Crunden was born on December 23, 1940, in Jersey City, New Jersey. He grew up in New Jersey and Nova Scotia, Canada. He attended Yale University, where William H. Goetzmann was one of his professors, and he graduated magna cum laude in 1962. He earned a PhD in History from Harvard University in 1967. His dissertation director was Frank Freidel.

== Career ==
Crunden taught History and American Studies at the University of Texas at Austin from 1967 until his death in 1999. He was the director of the American Studies program from 1985 to 1990. He was awarded a Fulbright chair as the Bicentennial Professor of American Studies at the University of Helsinki in 1976-1977, and he was the director of the American Studies Research Center in Hyderabad, India from 1982 to 1984, also thanks to the Fulbright Program. He was awarded a Fulbright senior lectureship to teach at La Trobe University in Australia in 1978.

Crunden was the author of many books, including American Salons: Encounters with European Modernism, 1885-1917, which was translated into many languages.

== Personal life and death ==
Crunden had three daughters. He died of a heart attack on March 23, 1999, in Austin, Texas.

== Works ==
- Crunden, Robert M. (1964). The Mind and Art of Albert Jay Nock. Chicago: Henry Regnery Company. OCLC 166746.
- Buenker, John D.; Burnham, John C.; Crunden, Robert M. (1967). Progressivism. Cambridge, Massachusetts: Schenkman Pub. Co. ISBN 9780870736872. OCLC 2986138.
- Crunden, Robert M. (1969). A Hero in Spite of Himself: Brand Whitlock in Art, Politics and War. New York: Alfred A. Knopf. OCLC 431257447.
- Crunden, Robert M. (1972). From Self to Society, 1919-1941. Englewood Cliffs, New Jersey: Prentice-Hall. ISBN 9780133314212. OCLC 238892.
- Crunden, Robert M., ed. (1977). The Superfluous Men: Conservative Critics of American Culture, 1900-1945. Austin, Texas: University of Texas Press. ISBN 9780292775275. OCLC 2284055.
- Crunden, Robert M. (1982). Ministers of Reform: The Progressives' Achievement in American Civilization, 1889-1920. New York: Basic Books. ISBN 9780465046317. OCLC 8552173.
- Crunden, Robert M. (1993). American Salons: Encounters with European Modernism, 1885-1917. New York: Oxford University Press. ISBN 9781601297846. OCLC 191931534.
- Crunden, Robert M. (1994). A Brief History of American Culture. New York: Paragon House. ISBN 9781557787057. OCLC 27895854.
- Crunden, Robert M. (2000). Body & Soul: The Making of American Modernism. New York: Basic Books. ISBN 9780465014842. OCLC 42475716.
