= Maria Cristina Garcia =

American historian

- Occupations: Researcher, professor, writer
- Awards: Carnegie Fellowship

Academic background
- Education: Georgetown University (BA); University of Texas at Austin (PhD)
- Doctoral advisor: Robert Morse Crunden

Academic work
- Institutions: Cornell University
- Doctoral students: Julian Lim
- Website: history.cornell.edu/maria-cristina-garcia

Maria Cristina Garcia (born 1960) is an American historian, currently the Howard A. Newman Professor of American Studies at Cornell University. Her work focuses on the history of displaced and mobile populations in the Americas.

Garcia received her B.A. from Georgetown University and her Ph.D. from the University of Texas at Austin. She is a fellow of the American Academy of Arts and Sciences and the Society of American Historians. She is a recipient of a 2016 Andrew Carnegie Fellowship, the 2010 Cornell Stephen and Margery Russell Teaching Award, the 2016 Kendall S. Carpenter Memorial Advising Award, and the President's and Provost's Award for Excellence in research, Teaching, and Service in Diversity.

She is also a former fellow of the Woodrow Wilson International Center for Scholars in Washington, D.C. and a past president of the Immigration and Ethnic History Society (2015-2018).

== Havana USA (1996) ==
Garcia is the author of Havana USA: Cuban Exiles and Cuban Americans in South Florida (University of California Press), which examines the federal policies precipitating the post-revolutionary migration of Cubans to the United States, as well as the Cuban American community's emergence as an important political lobby and entrepreneurial business community. The text details Cuban influence on foreign policy and electoral outcomes, how they reshaped the cultural landscape of the Southern United States, and redefined American assimilation in the 20th century.

== Seeking Refuge (2006) ==
Her second book, Seeking Refuge: Central American Migration to Mexico, the United States, and Canada (University of California Press) is a comparative study of the international responses to the Salvadoran, Guatemalan, and Nicaraguan refugee crisis of the 1980s and 1990s. Garcia details the role non-governmental organizations and transnational advocacy networks played in prompting nationwide debates about U.S. immigration; such efforts are attributed with creating a more responsive refugee policy.

Analytically, Garcia primarily cites the work of individuals, groups, and organizations which responded to the Central American refugee crisis of the 1980s and 1990s, and whose efforts restructured refugee policies throughout North America. Collectively, domestic and transnational advocacy networks documented the abuses of states, pressured for changes in policy, provided representation to the displaced and the excluded, and ultimately re-framed national debates about immigration.

== Recent publications (2018-present) ==
In her most recent work, State of Disaster: The Failure of U.S. Migration Policy in an Age of Climate Change, Garcia examines the environmental origins and factors affecting refugee migrations.

In The Refugee Challenge in Post-Cold War America (Oxford University Press), Garcia examines the most important political actors and issues for the development of the United States' refugee and asylum policy since 1989.

An anthology, co-edited with Maddalena Marinari entitled Whose America? US Immigration Policy since 1980 was published by the University of Illinois Press in 2023. A second anthology, coedited with Madeline Hsu and Maddalena Marinari, entitled A Nation of Immigrants Reconsidered: The U.S. in an Age of Restriction, 1924-1965 was published by the University of Illinois Press in the fall of 2018.

== Books ==
- State of Disaster: The Failure of U.S. Migration Policy in an Age of Climate Change (2022)
- The Refugee Challenge in Post-Cold War America (2017)
- Seeking Refuge: Central American Migration to Mexico, the United States, and Canada (2006)
- Havana USA: Cuban Exiles and Cuban Americans in South Florida (1996)

== Anthologies ==
- Whose America? U.S. Immigration Policy since 1980 (2023)
- A Nation of Immigrants Reconsidered: The U.S. in an Age of Restriction, 1924-1965
