= The American People =

American history textbook

The American People is a history textbook published by Pearson Education Incorporated. The editors of the text are Gary B. Nash of the University of California at Los Angeles, Julie Roy Jeffrey of Goucher College, John R. Howe of the University of Minnesota, Peter J. Frederick of Wabash College, Allen F. Davis of Temple University, and Allan M. Winkler of Miami University.

== Summary ==
=== Part One: A Colonizing People, 1492–1776 ===
Chapter One, Ancient Americas and Africa: Includes the history of the peoples of America before Columbus, Africa on the eve of contact, Europe on the eve of contact, and a conclusion on the approach of a new global age.

Chapter Two, Europeans and Africans Reach the Americas: Includes the breaching of the Atlantic, the Spanish conquest of America, England looking west, African bondage, and a conclusion on converging worlds.

Chapter Three, Colonizing a Continent in the Seventeenth Century: Includes the history of Chesapeake tobacco coast, Massachusetts and its offspring, the French in Canada, proprietary Carolina, the Quakers and their "peaceable kingdom," New Spain and its northern frontier, the Era of Instability, and a conclusion on the achievement of new societies.

Chapter Four, The Maturíng of Colonial Society: Includes the history of the Northern and Southern colonies, conflict in the New World, the urban world of commerce and ideas, the Great Awakening, political life in the colonies, and a conclusion on America in 1750.

Chapter Five, The Strains of Empire: Includes the climatic Seven Years' War, the crisis with England, the ideology of Revolutionary Republicanism, the turmoil of a rebellious people, and a conclusion on the time where the colonies were on the brink of revolution.

=== Part Two: A Revolutionary People, 1775–1828 ===
Chapter Six, A People in Revolution: Includes the bursting of the colonial bonds, the American War for Independence, the experiences of war, the ferment of revolutionary politics, and a conclusion on the crucible of revolution.

Chapter Seven, Consolidating the Revolution: Includes the struggle of a peacetime agenda, sources of political conflict, the political tumult in the states, the movement toward a new national government, and a conclusion on completing the revolution.

Chapter Eight, Creating a Nation: Includes the launching of the national republic, the republic in a threatening world, how the political crisis deepened, the restoration of American liberty, the building of an agrarian nation, foreign policy of the new nation, and a conclusion on the period of trial and transition.

Chapter Nine, Society and Politics in the Early Republic: Includes how America was a nation of regions, Indian-White relations in the early republic, the end of Neo-Colonialism, how America was knitted together, how politics were in transition, and a conclusion on the passing of an era.

=== Part Three: An Expanding People, 1820–1877 ===
Chapter Ten, Economic Transformations in the Northeast and the Old Northwest:

Chapter Eleven, Slavery and the Old South:

Chapter Twelve, Shaping America in the Antebellum Age:

Chapter Thirteen, Moving West:

Chapter Fourteen, The Union in Peril:

Chapter Fifteen, The Union Severed:

Chapter Sixteen, The Union Reconstructed:

=== Part Four: An Industrializing People, 1865–1900 ===
Chapter Seventeen, Rural America; The West and the New South:

Chapter Eighteen, The Rise of Smokestack America:

Chapter Nineteen, Politics and Reform:

Chapter Twenty, Becoming a World Power:

=== Part Five: A Modernizing People, 1900–1945 ===
Chapter Twenty-One, The Progressives Confront Industrial Capitalism:

Chapter Twenty-Two, The Great War:

Chapter Twenty-Three, Affluence and Anxiety:

Chapter Twenty-Four, The Great Depression and the New Deal:

Chapter Twenty-Five, World War Two:

=== Part Six: A Resilient People, 1945–2002 ===
Chapter Twenty-Six, Postwar America at Home, 1945–1960:

Chapter Twenty-Seven, Chills and Fever During the Cold War, 1945–1960:

Chapter Twenty-Eight, Reform and Rebellion in the Turbulent Sixties, 1960–1969:

Chapter Twenty-Nine, Disorder and Discontent, 1969–1980:

Chapter Thirty, The Revival of Conservatism, 1980–1992:

Chapter Thirty-One, The Post-Cold War World, 1992–2002:

=== Appendices ===
Includes the Declaration of Independence, Constitution of the United States of America, chart of United States presidential elections, States of the United States, chart of the Population of the United States.

=== Index ===
Sixty-two pages covering the entire text.
