= María Dolores García Cotarelo =

Spanish politician

- Born: María Dolores García Cotarelo; 17 August 1943; A Coruña
- Other names: Mariló García Cotarelo
- Occupation: Politician
- Years active: 1975 -
- Spouse: Ángel Díaz Sol

María Dolores García Cotarelo (born 17 August 1943 in A Coruña) is a Spanish politician. First involved with a clandestine socialist organization back in 1975, she went on to become the Deputy Mayor of Culture of the City Hall of Granada and was charged with insulting religion. She continued to be involved in party politics in 2017, and was honored in 2018 as one of eleven women who helped bring democracy to Granada.

== Political career ==
García Cotarelo joined a clandestine socialist organization in 1975. In this period, she and her then husband Ángel Díaz Sol were key figures in the Granada socialist community. After the democratic transition, her political activity was able to be open as result of changes in Spain. She went on to become the Deputy Mayor of Culture of the City Hall of Granada. She was on the socialist of candidates for the 1979 local Granada elections. In 1982, García Cotarelo was involved with the International Theater Festival of Granada project, which rSn into problems as a result of the political situation at the time. he proposed the Rimado de Ciudad project in 1983. In 1984, she was prosecuted for insulting religion, violating article 209 of the Penal Code, after allowing a comic depicting a priest holding up his cassock to reveal his genitals that were an inverted cross to be included in an exhibition she organized. The comic was removed from the exhibit by Franco era councilor Eduardo Jiménez Gil de Sagredo. García Cotarelo told El Pais at the time, "The times of censorship have already passed, and from this exhibition is the municipality the only responsible." At the same time of the prosecution, she was also named a Bishop of the Reformed Universal Church of God in Spain. While she was Deputy Mayor, she supported the local music scene. She also helped bring carnival to the city. She was acquitted in June 1985. She continued to serve in the role of Deputy Mayor of Culture in 1986 and 1987. Following a fire at the Manuel de Falla auditorium, opposition councilor Enrique Martínez Checa demanded the resignation of García Cotarelo and several others in the city government.

García Cotarelo went on to serve as director of Museo Casa Natal Federico García Lorca for a short period of time in the 2000s. She was still involved in PSOE party politics in 2017. In 2018, she was one of eleven women honored by the Townhall of Granada for helping restore democracy to the city. The other women were Mercedes Moll de Miguel, Antonina Rodrigo, Concepción Fernández-Píñar Lorca, María Izquierdo Rojo, Natividad Bullejos Cáliz, Milagros Mantilla de los Ríos, Amalia Jiménez García, Francisca Fuillerat Pérez, Mariluz Escribano Pueo and Fermina Puerta Rodríguez.

== Personal ==
Garcia Cotarelo was born on 17 August 1943 in A Coruña. She was married to Ángel Díaz Sol, with whom she has two children who are nine years apart in age. One was born in 1975, and the other was born in 1966. Her husband was born in Madrid, and sources have wrongly listed his place of birth as hers. She moved from Madrid, where she met her husband at university, to Granada so he could take a faculty teaching position. Garcia Cotarelo studied biology, and her profession before entering politics as a biologist with a focus on human genetics.

While her name is María Dolores, she has been called a number of names including Mariló and Beatriz. No one actually calls her María Dolores.
