= James Henretta =

American historian (born 1940)

- Born: James A. Henretta; November 18, 1940 (age 85)
- Education: Swarthmore College; Harvard University
- Occupation: Historian

James A. Henretta (born November 18, 1940) is an American historian. He is a Professor Emeritus of American History at the University of Maryland, College Park. Henretta is a Fulbright Scholar, and has received a grant from the National Endowment for the Humanities.

He graduated from Swarthmore College and Harvard University.

== Selected works ==
- Documents for America's History, Volume 1: To 1877
- America: A Concise History
- Narrative Life of Frederick Douglass
- Evolution and Revolution
- "Salutary Neglect": Colonial Administration Under the Duke of Newcastle
- The Evolution of American Society, 1700-1815: An Interdisciplinary Analysis
- Documents to Accompany America's History, Volume I: To 1877
