= T. Harry Williams =

American historian and author (1909–1979)

- Born: May 19, 1909
- Died: July 8, 1979 (aged 70)
- Known for: biographies
- Awards: Pulitzer Prize for Biography; National Book Award

Academic background
- Education: Platteville State Teachers College; University of Wisconsin

Academic work
- Discipline: history
- Institutions: Louisiana State University
- Notable works: Huey Long

Thomas Harry Williams (May 19, 1909 — July 8, 1979) was an American historian and author. For the majority of his academic career between the 1930s to 1970s, Williams taught history at Louisiana State University. While at LSU, Williams was a Boyd Professor of History from 1953 to 1979. Near the end of his tenure at LSU, the university created the T. Harry Williams Chair of American History. He also taught at extension schools in Wisconsin and at the Municipal University of Omaha.

As an author, Williams wrote biographical works between the 1940s to 1970s, including multiple books on Abraham Lincoln and Rutherford B. Hayes. He also wrote about P. G. T. Beauregard, the American Civil War and Huey Long. In 1970, Huey Long won the Pulitzer Prize for Biography and the National Book Award in the History and Autobiography category. Williams received a Guggenheim Fellowship in 1956.

== Early life and education ==
Williams was born in Vinegar Hill, Illinois, on May 19, 1909. He grew up in the area of Hazel Green, Wisconsin, with his family after the death of his mother.

In the 1930s, Williams completed his post-secondary education at Platteville State Teachers College and the University of Wisconsin.

== Career ==
=== Teaching ===
During his studies at Wisconsin, Williams became an instructor in 1936. While teaching history for their extension schools, Williams was dismissed from his position at Wausau, Wisconsin in November 1936. After his dismissal, Williams said his comments about the Gettysburg Address and Abraham Lincoln were "misquoted and misrepresented". The following month, Williams' position at Wausau was restored. In between his extension tenures for Wisconsin, Williams briefly taught in West Virginia University. Williams remained with the extensions until he continued his instructive experience for the Municipal University of Omaha in 1938. He was an assistant professor for Omaha by the time he left in 1941.

In 1941, Williams began at Louisiana State University (LSU) as a history professor. While there, Williams taught about the Civil War. He was named a Boyd professor for the university in 1953. Williams continued to hold the position of Boyd Professor of History for Louisiana State until 1979. In May of that year, Williams ended his tenure with LSU.

Outside of the United States, Williams worked in England from 1966 to 1967. While with the University of Oxford, Williams was Harmsworth Professor of American History.

=== Works ===
While at Louisiana State, Williams' Lincoln and the Radicals was published in 1941. In 1950, Williams began a three-decade career with Louisiana State University Press as the editor of their Southern Biography Series. In 1952, Williams' Lincoln and His Generals was published. In 1956, Williams joined the Baton Rouge Advocate as a book reviewer and remained in his position until 1966. Williams had written three more books about Abraham Lincoln by 1958, which included two publications about works written by Lincoln. During this time period, Williams published a biography on P. G. T. Beauregard in 1955 titled Beauregard: Napoleon in Gray. The following year, Williams used a manuscript authored by Beauregard to create With Beauregard in Mexico: The Mexican Reminiscences of P.G.T. Beauregard as an editor. From the 1960s to 1970s, Williams's works continued to focus on American historical events.

For individual historical works, Williams published a 1962 book of collected essays about generals in the American Civil War called McClellan, Sherman, and Grant. This book on Union generals focused on Ulysses S. Grant, George B. McClellan and William T. Sherman. For a 1963 republication of a work by Edward Porter Alexander, Williams added a preface to Military Memoirs of a Confederate. Williams used a diary by Rutherford B. Hayes to create Hayes: The Diary of a President in 1964. Williams included historical summaries while keeping any errors that were made in the diary. The following year, Williams wrote solely on Hayes's Army experience with his 1965 publication Hayes of the Twenty-Third: The Civil War Volunteer Officer. In between Williams managed to write two volumes for an early Time Life Books series, the 1963-64 The LIFE History of the United States series, which concerned volumes 5 ("The Union Sundered, 1849-1865", OCLC 228435529) and 6 ("The Union Restored, 1861-1876", OCLC 1407715615), both released in 1963.

Apart from the Civil War, Williams wrote about Huey Long between the early 1960s to early 1970s. He started writing this biography in 1955. His Long biography was published in 1969. In 1977, Williams started a book about Lyndon B. Johnson. After Williams conducted research on Johnson in 1979, he died before he could complete his biography.

== Writing process ==
For his Civil War works, Williams used diaries and other secondary research materials. Williams created the Long biography with his wife by using interviews conducted with a tape recorder. To create his books, Williams used terminology that was used in the past while writing his works with a notebook and pencil. Williams continuously edited his drafts until he was satisfied with all of the words in his paragraphs.

== Awards and honors ==
In 1956, Williams received a Guggenheim Fellowship in the U.S. History category. With Huey Long, Williams won the Pulitzer Prize for Biography in 1970. That year, Huey Long also won the National Book Award in the History and Autobiography category and the Louisiana Literary Award from the Louisiana Library Association. Near the end of his tenure at Louisiana State, the university created the T. Harry Williams Chair of American History in 1979. His incomplete work, The History of American Wars from 1745 to 1918, was posthumously published in 1981. The 1983 posthumously published book, The Selected Essays of T. Harry Williams, contained both old and new essays written by Williams.

== Personal life and death ==
Williams had one child during his marriage. He died in Baton Rouge, Louisiana on July 8, 1979.
