= Finances of George Washington =

Economic status of American statesman

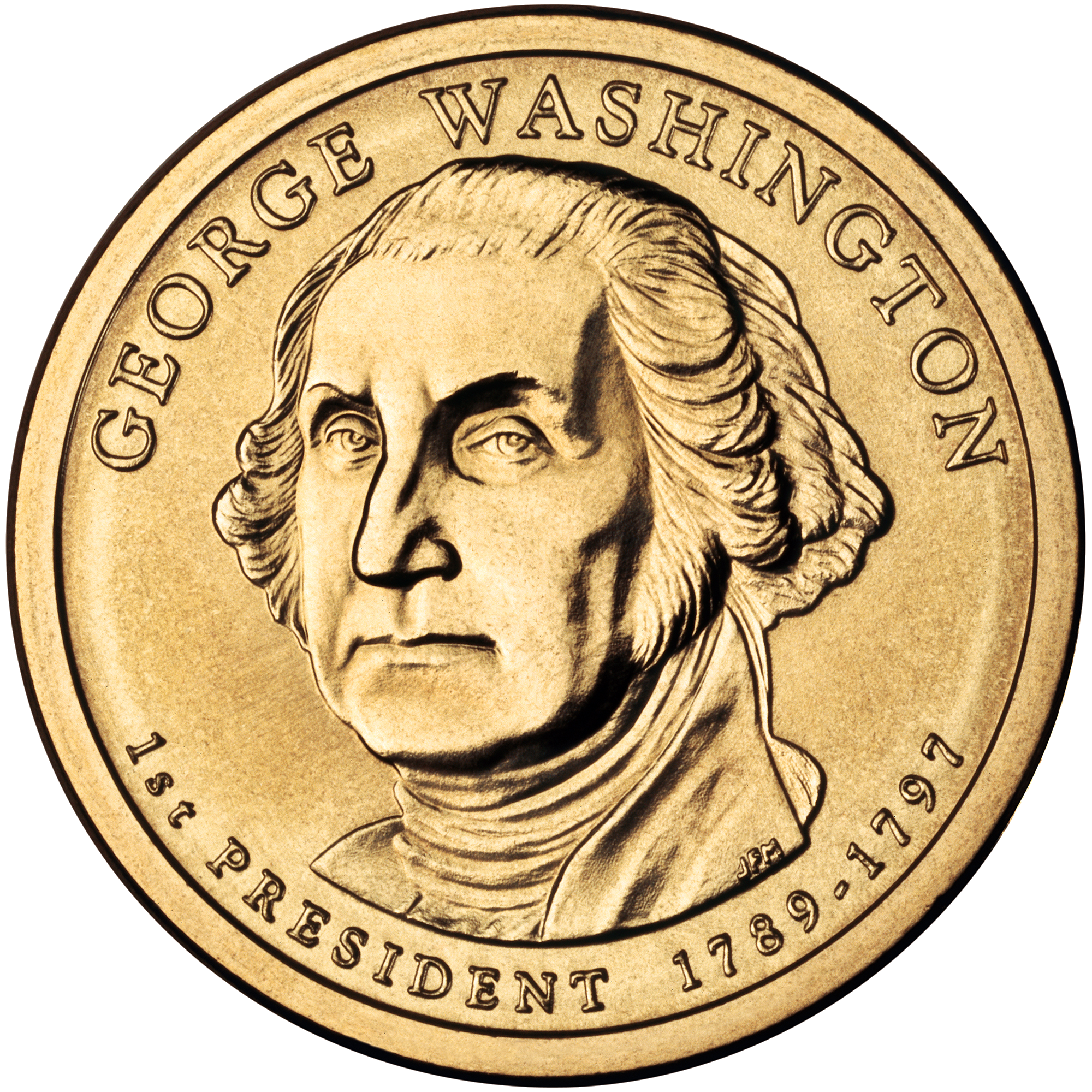
George Washington Presidential $1 Coin obverse

George Washington is frequently cited as among the wealthiest presidents of the United States. Estimates of his wealth vary depending on the methods used for calculation. His net worth has been estimated at about $780,000 at the time of his death, which would be equivalent to approximately $594 million in 2020 dollars when adjusted for inflation and relative economic value.

Much of Washington’s wealth consisted of landholdings, enslaved people, and other fixed assets rather than liquid capital, leading historians to describe him as “asset rich but cash poor.”

== Assets and liabilities ==
Assets

Washington accumulated his wealth in several different ways; through employment as a surveyor, Continental Army officer and President; investments in bonds and corporate equities; income from his Mount Vernon plantation and assets inherited from his family and through his wealthy wife. George Washington accordingly had a broad portfolio of assets and investments which contributed to his significant net worth.

As President, Washington drew a salary of $25,000, equal to 2% of the total government budget. Washington was a significant landowner, his 1800 Will recording 52,194 acres of land to be sold or distributed. His Mount Vernon plantation enslaved 316 persons, a third of whom were Washington's personal property. They farmed tobacco, wheat, corn, flax, and hemp. Moreover, he owned and operated the largest whiskey distillery in America at the time, producing almost 11,000 gallons in the year of his death. Washington also accumulated a large haul of luxury homewares and clothing, together with lavish foodstuffs he used to entertain guests.

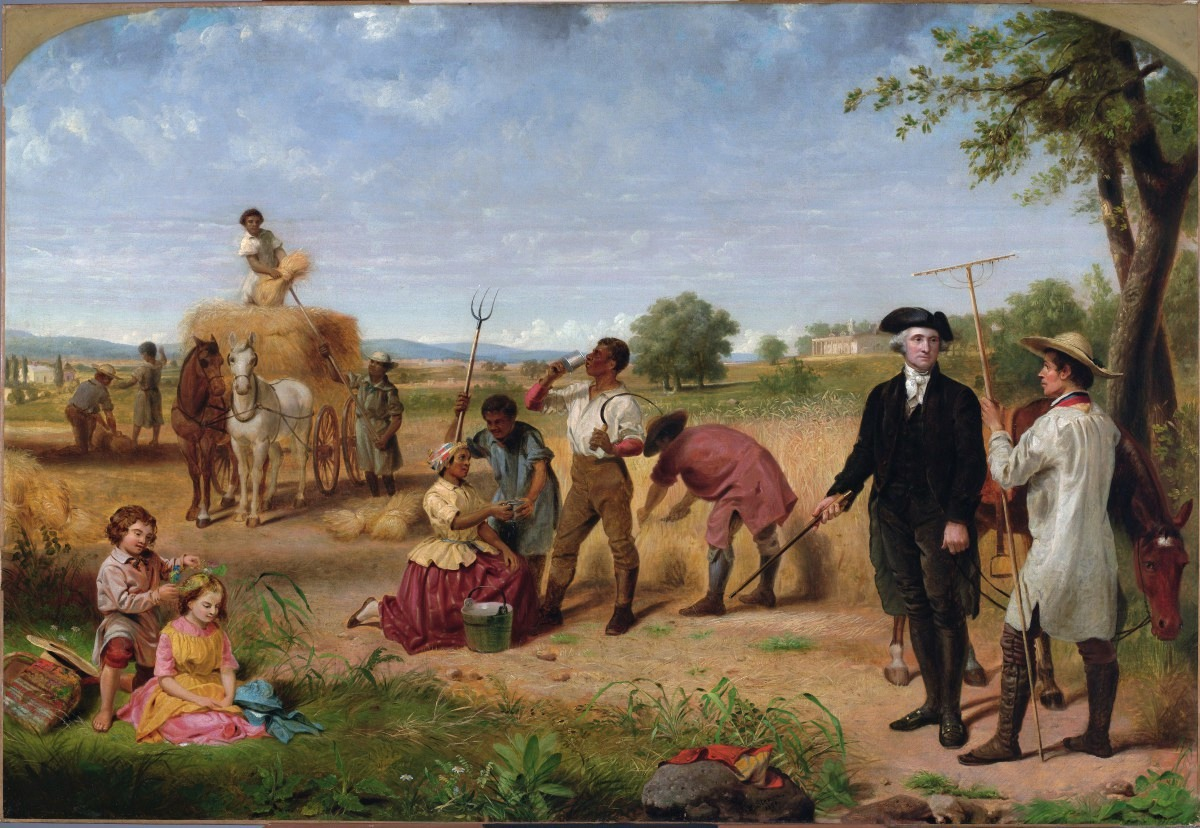
Junius Brutus Stearns – George Washington as farmer at Mount Vernon

Liabilities

Despite George Washington's significant wealth, he also accrued considerable liabilities across his life and career. Significant taxation imposed by the British greatly affected Washington, consuming 75% of his income by his own estimates. Instead of drawing a salary as leader of the Continental Army, Washington elected to be reimbursed for wartime expenditures. Due to military service his agricultural business became a product of neglect. His extravagances also meant he regularly went into debt to fund his lifestyle, while anticipating income from the sale of the annual harvest. As with many landowners, George Washington was dependent on slave labour to operate his agricultural business. As his slaves grew older, their productivity inevitably declined, and Washington refused to re-sell them on principle due to the potential for families to be dispersed. In the poor economic conditions after the Revolutionary War, Washington was unable to lease or sell his landholdings, making him asset rich but cash poor. Washington's financial constraints continued into his leadership of the Continental Army. The Army was constantly short on money, impugning its ability to expand and rearm and thus leading to failures on the battlefield. Washington was forced to seek funding from France and other backers to keep it afloat. Following his war leadership, he did not receive any pension in recompense for his service.

== Wartime expense management ==
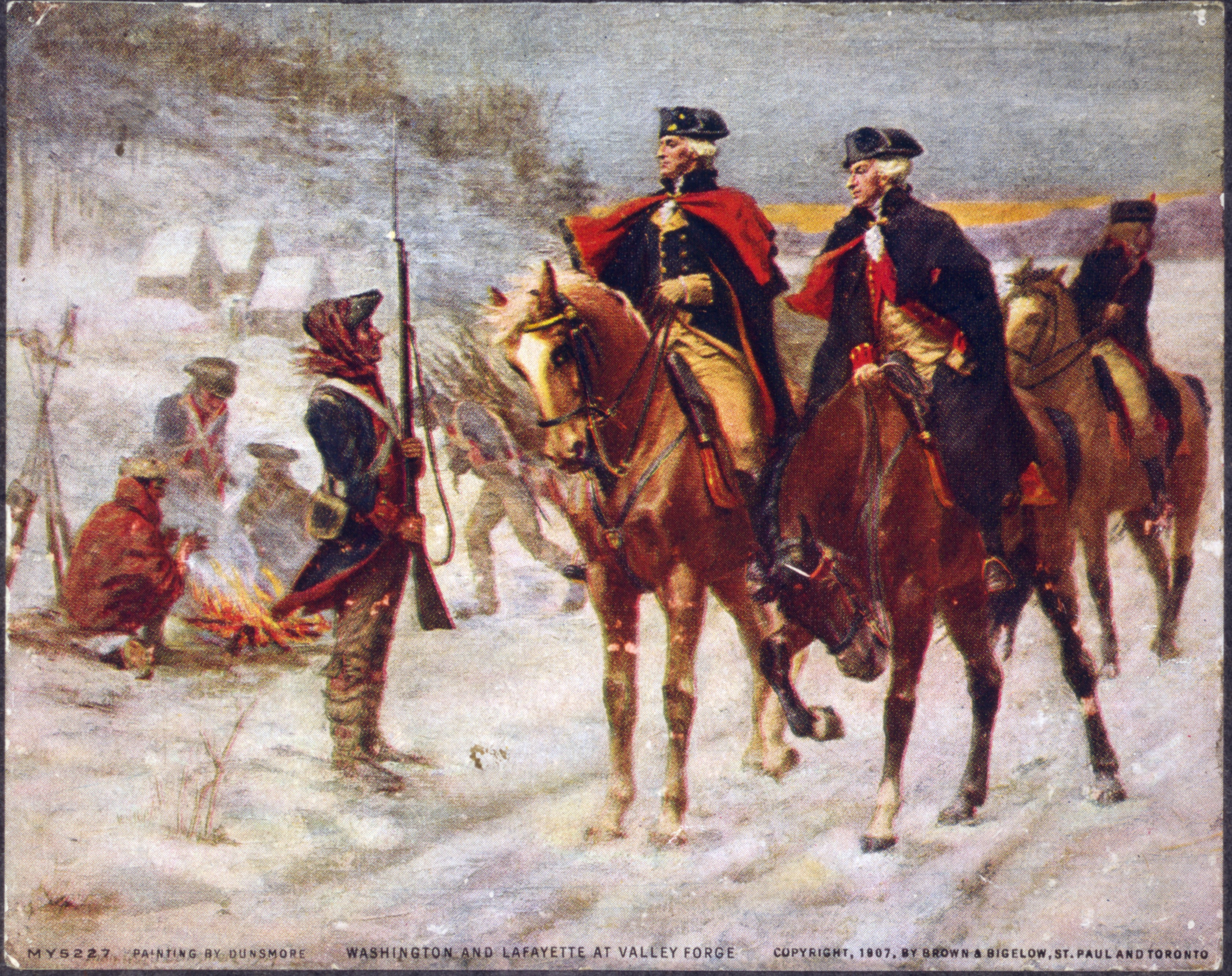
Washington and Lafayette at Valley Forge

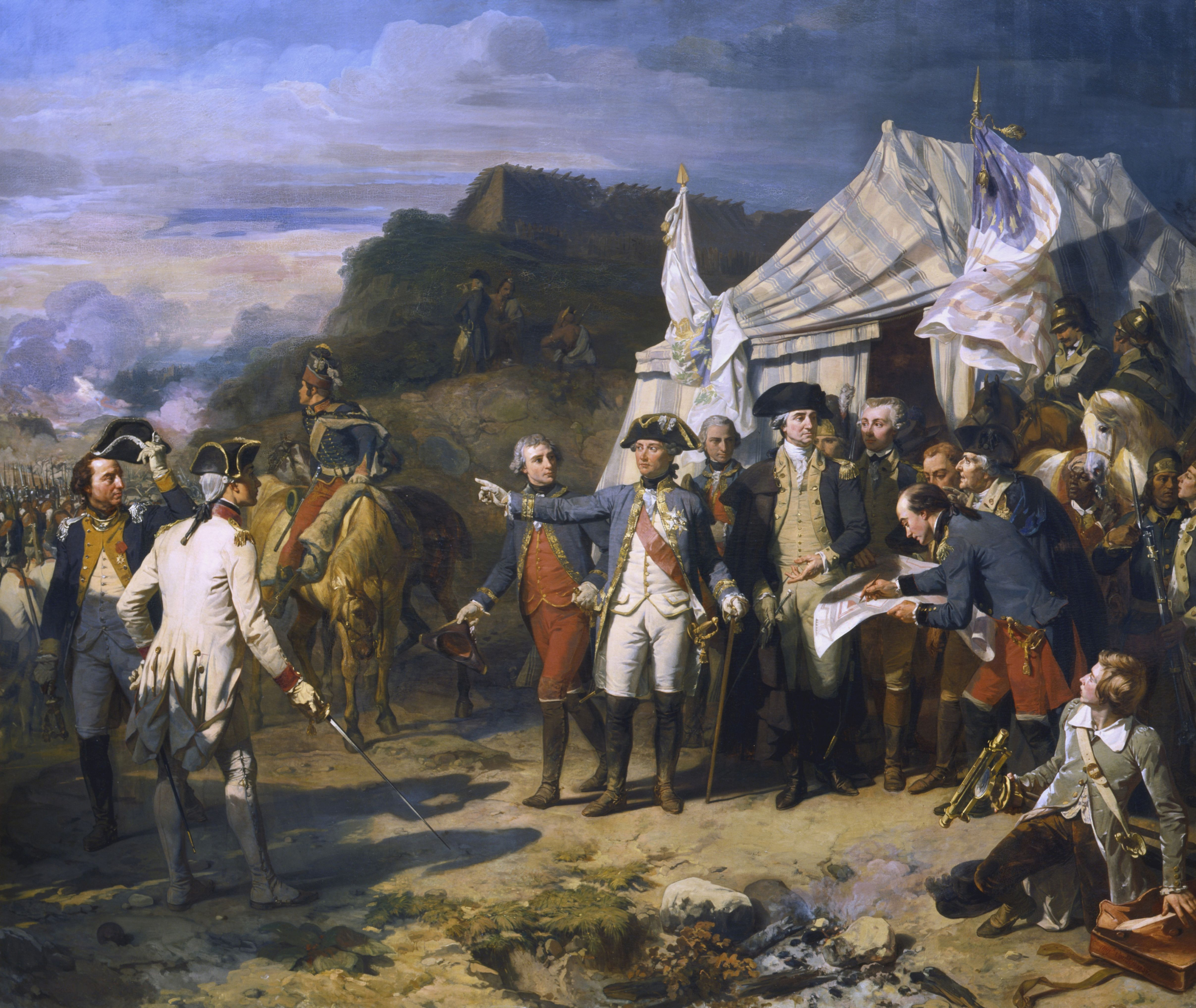
Washington and Rochambeau at Yorktown

While serving as Commander in Chief of the Continental Army, Washington declined an income of $48 000 in favor of receiving a personal expense account in which he could be reimbursed. During the duration of his involvement in the Revolutionary War (June 19, 1775 – December 23, 1783), Washington's expense account totaled $449,261.51. Despite Washington's expenditures and monetary requests, by October 1780, he had to discharge soldiers in New Jersey, to mitigate the possibility of revolt due to the lack of supplies and the poor health of soldiers. Although warnings were issued to troops, concerns such as desertion and theft continued to arise. This followed prior efforts to acquire more funding and resources, whereby Washington would appeal to congress for further financing on a regular basis. Notably, ‘The Grand Forage’ of February 1778, highlights the extent to which access to supplies had become desperate, whereby logistical issues and sourcing resulted in soldiers needing to forage for supplies. The excursion required 1500–2000 men from multiple segments of the army, a significant portion of manpower which would take a period of 6 weeks to complete. In 1779, the public was subsequently paid by Washington's Army for goods taken, albeit many were not sufficiently compensated and payment was not voluntarily made from Washington's Army.

When Congress had the capacity to respond to Washington's requests for supplies, contractual arrangements were put into operation with some difficulty, but the remaining army was able to be sustained as a result. Soldiers went from having minimal supplies to being better provided for with enough food and general supplies by 1783, but unpaid wages were still a concern, with troops needing to be released from duty. Washington faced a number of financial concerns when managing war expenses, including not only the maintenance of his own troops, but also the feeding of prisoners of war and funding espionage activities. Washington also faced significant pressure in resolving tensions between officers, over supplies and pay for their men. The surviving expense journals illuminate the financial challenges faced by Washington in these difficult circumstances. His bookkeeping demonstrated a great depth of detail for minimal expenses, with minor detail provided for significant expenditures that typically would demand an in-depth breakdown of information. This even extended to vaguely covering expenses for other parties and the terms ‘miscellaneous’ and ‘ditto’ often being relied upon to describe expenditures.

These activities placed a major strain on the economy with the accrual of further debt. Robert Morris worked alongside his assistant Gouverneur Morris and Alexander Hamilton in an attempt to supplement America's economic distress and resolve its debt issues. He implemented an economic program in place to resolve the issues surrounding the nation's debt. However, despite this, Morris used his own wealth to act as a personal creditor in the issuing of notes (named ‘Morris notes’) to pay soldiers. He then resigned from his position to maintain his ability to be a creditor. The condition faced by America following the economic damage incurred by the expenses of the Revolutionary War that Alexander Hamilton, acting as an aide to Washington at this time had strong concerns surrounding the future of broader America was such that he was planning possibly moving to Geneva if New York was no longer a stable place to consider moving to if the situation did not improve. No longer acting as a Commander in Chief for the Revolutionary War and becoming elected as president in 1789, Washington later faced a financially devastated federal government and economy.

== Economic interactions ==
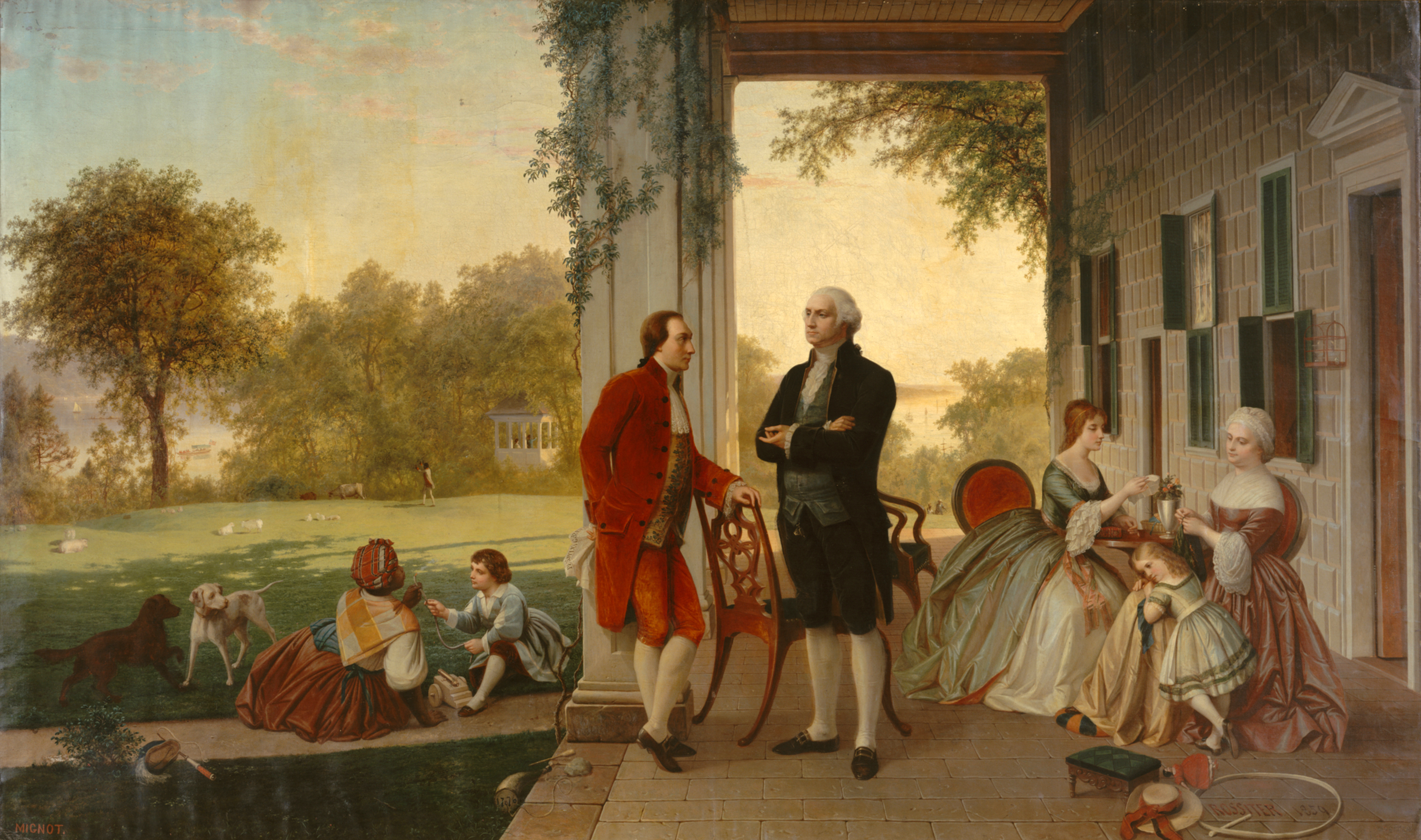
Washington and Lafayette at Mount Vernon, 1784

George Washington used his time in and out of public office to interact with the U.S. economy in a way that would benefit both his personal finances and the American people. Washington's interactions with the economy in his public and private lives were characterised by a sense of entrepreneurship, pursuing personal and communal wealth for America.

Personal life

Recognising the economic opportunities present in land acquisition, using his skills as a land surveyor, Washington made much of his wealth from property speculation. His estate was valued at $780,000 in 1799, approximately $429 million in today's money. Relative to the American economy of the time, his estate of $780,000.00 represented 0.19% of the gross domestic product. Taking advantage of an economy in its infancy with associated cheap land prices, Washington purchased 1800-acres of land in 1760 for $1653, the same land selling in 2021 for $50 million. Washington was a proprietor and businessman in his personal life. His interactions with the US economy can be classified as entrepreneurial and pro-business in nature.

Public life

When he came into power in 1789, Washington was met by an economy in disarray. He was tasked with repairing a financial situation that saw ballooning post-revolution debts and inflation. Washington appointed Alexander Hamilton as his Secretary of Treasury that same year. It is through this partnership with Hamilton that Washington was able to interact with and impact the American economy, whereby they developed a three-stage plan to help the US economy. Firstly, the Federal government would take on state debt, paying it back in full; secondly, they planned to pay back bonds issued during the war at face value; and finally, legislation was passed to facilitate the creation of a national bank. His government was keen on promoting domestic manufacturing, assisted by the Report on the Subject of Manufacturers in 1791. His policies of careful debt repayments via taxation and promotion of manufacturing aimed towards the creation of national wealth were relatively novel in the 18th century, contrasting against the British Mercantilist system. Washington voiced his opposition to the British commandeering of profits from the Virginian tobacco trade, asking, "Can it be otherwise than a little mortifying to find that we, who … contribute so largely to the dispatch of your ships in this country should meet with such unprofitable returns?". His economic policies were consistent with his personal interests in the economy. He sought to achieve stability, while also encouraging business and entrepreneurship through his promotion of manufacturing activities. As President, Washington's policies would help to transform and invigorate the American economy. Consequently, for the last decade of the 18th century, GDP per capita would grow by 9.78% per year, matching the per capita output of the British empire 20 years later. This significant economic growth accordingly benefited Washington by improving the value of his holdings.
