= New Deal =

1930s programs of U.S. president Franklin D. Roosevelt

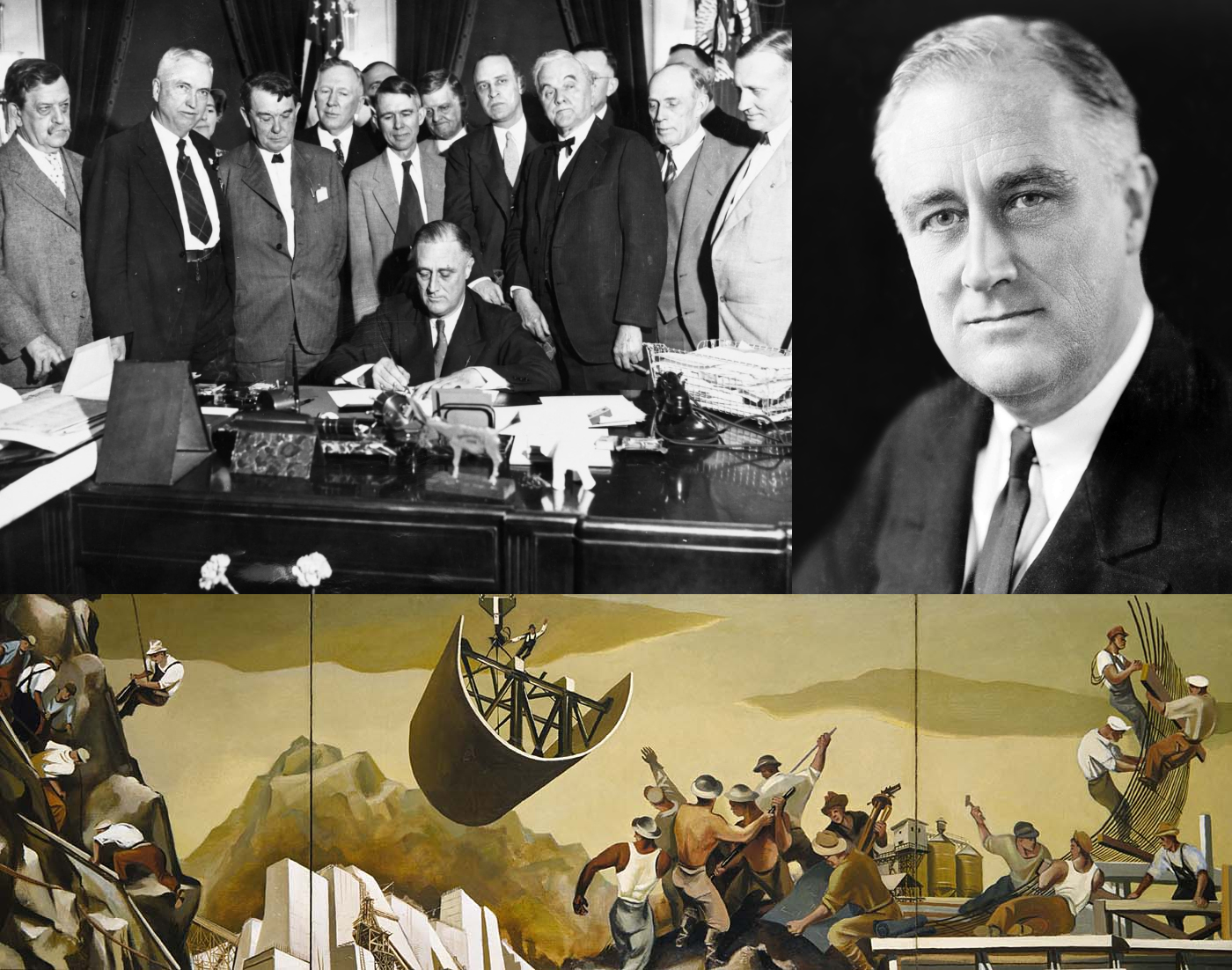
- Top left: Signing of the Tennessee Valley Authority Act, 1933; Top right: President Franklin D. Roosevelt; Bottom: Works Progress Administration public mural
- Location: United States
- Type: Economic program
- Cause: Great Depression
- Organized by: President Franklin D. Roosevelt
- Outcome: Job creation, social security, financial reforms, and agricultural support; Expanded labor rights and unions; Political power shifts to Democratic Party's New Deal coalition

The New Deal was a series of economic, social, and political reforms in response to the Great Depression in the United States under the first and second administrations of President Franklin D. Roosevelt. Following a demand-side economic theory, Roosevelt sought to utilize the authority of the federal government to increase spending and introduce programs to spur growth and combat issues specific to the depression, such as unemployment, labor relations, financial reform, and social welfare.

Roosevelt introduced the phrase when accepting the Democratic Party presidential nomination in the 1932 United States presidential election. He won this election in a landslide over incumbent Herbert Hoover, whose administration was widely viewed as ineffective. Roosevelt attributed the Depression to inherent market instability and inadequate aggregate demand (based on the Keynesian economic model), and argued that stabilizing and rationalizing the economy required massive government intervention.

During Roosevelt's first hundred days in office in 1933 until 1935, Roosevelt introduced what historians refer to as the "First New Deal", which focused on the "3 R's": relief for the unemployed and for the poor, recovery of the economy back to normal levels, and reforms of the financial system to prevent a repeat depression. Roosevelt signed the Emergency Banking Act, which authorized the Federal Reserve to insure deposits to restore confidence, and the 1933 Banking Act made this permanent with the Federal Deposit Insurance Corporation (FDIC). Other laws created the National Recovery Administration (NRA), which allowed industries to create "codes of fair competition"; the Securities and Exchange Commission (SEC), which protected investors from abusive stock market practices; and the Agricultural Adjustment Administration (AAA), which raised rural incomes by controlling production. Public works were undertaken in order to find jobs for the unemployed (25 percent of the workforce when Roosevelt took office): the Civilian Conservation Corps (CCC) enlisted young men for manual labor on government land, and the Tennessee Valley Authority (TVA) promoted electricity generation and other forms of economic development in the drainage basin of the Tennessee River.

Although the First New Deal helped many find work and restored confidence in the financial system, by 1935 stock prices were still below pre-Depression levels and unemployment still exceeded 20 percent. From 1935 to 1938, the "Second New Deal" introduced further legislation and additional agencies which focused on job creation and on improving the conditions of the elderly, workers, and the poor. The Works Progress Administration (WPA) supervised the construction of bridges, libraries, parks, and other facilities, while also investing in the arts; the National Labor Relations Act guaranteed employees the right to organize trade unions; and the Social Security Act introduced pensions for senior citizens and benefits for the disabled, mothers with dependent children, and the unemployed. The Fair Labor Standards Act prohibited child labor, and enshrined a 40-hour work week and national minimum wage.

In 1938, the Republican Party gained seats in Congress and joined with conservative Democrats to block further New Deal legislation, and some of it was declared unconstitutional by the Supreme Court. The New Deal produced a political realignment, reorienting the Democratic Party's base to the New Deal coalition of labor unions, blue-collar workers, big city machines, racial minorities (most importantly African-Americans), white Southerners, and intellectuals. The realignment crystallized into a powerful liberal coalition which dominated presidential elections into the 1960s, as an opposing conservative coalition largely controlled Congress in domestic affairs from 1939 onwards. Historians still debate the effectiveness of the New Deal programs, although most accept that full employment was not achieved until the United States' entry into World War II in 1941.

== Origins ==
=== Economic collapse (1929–1933) ===
US annual real GDP from 1910 to 1960, with the years of the Great Depression (1929–1939) highlighted

Unemployment rate in the United States from 1910 to 1960, with the years of the Great Depression (1929–1939) highlighted (accurate data begins in 1939)

From 1929 to 1933 manufacturing output decreased by one third, which economist Milton Friedman later called the Great Contraction. Prices fell by 20%, causing deflation that made repaying debts much harder. Unemployment in the United States increased from 4% to 25%. Additionally, one-third of all employed persons were downgraded to working part-time on much smaller paychecks. In the aggregate, almost 50% of the nation's human work-power was going unused.

Before the New Deal, USA bank deposits were not "guaranteed" by government. When thousands of banks closed, depositors temporarily lost access to their money; most of the funds were eventually restored but there was gloom and panic. The United States had no national safety net, no public unemployment insurance and no Social Security. Relief for the poor was the responsibility of families, private charity and local governments, but as conditions worsened year by year demand skyrocketed and their combined resources increasingly fell far short of demand.

The depression had psychologically devastated the nation. As Roosevelt took the oath of office at noon on March 4, 1933, all state governors had authorized bank holidays or restricted withdrawals—many Americans had little or no access to their bank accounts. Farm income had fallen by over 50% since 1929. Between 1930 and 1933, an estimated 844,000 non-farm mortgages were foreclosed on, out of a total of five million. Political and business leaders feared revolution and anarchy. Joseph P. Kennedy Sr., who remained wealthy during the Depression, recalled that "in those days I felt and said I would be willing to part with half of what I had if I could be sure of keeping, under law and order, the other half."

=== Campaign ===
Throughout the nation men and women, forgotten in the political philosophy of the Government, look to us here for guidance and for more equitable opportunity to share in the distribution of national wealth... I pledge myself to a new deal for the American people. This is more than a political campaign. It is a call to arms.

— Franklin D. Roosevelt, 1932

The phrase "New Deal" was coined by an adviser to Roosevelt, Stuart Chase, who used A New Deal as the title for an article published in the progressive magazine The New Republic a few days before Roosevelt's speech. Speechwriter Rosenman added it to his draft of FDR's presidential nomination acceptance speech at the last minute. Upon accepting the 1932 Democratic nomination for president, Roosevelt promised "a new deal for the American people". In campaign speeches, Roosevelt committed to carrying out, if elected, several elements of what would become the New Deal, such as unemployment relief and public works programs.

== First New Deal (1933–1934) ==
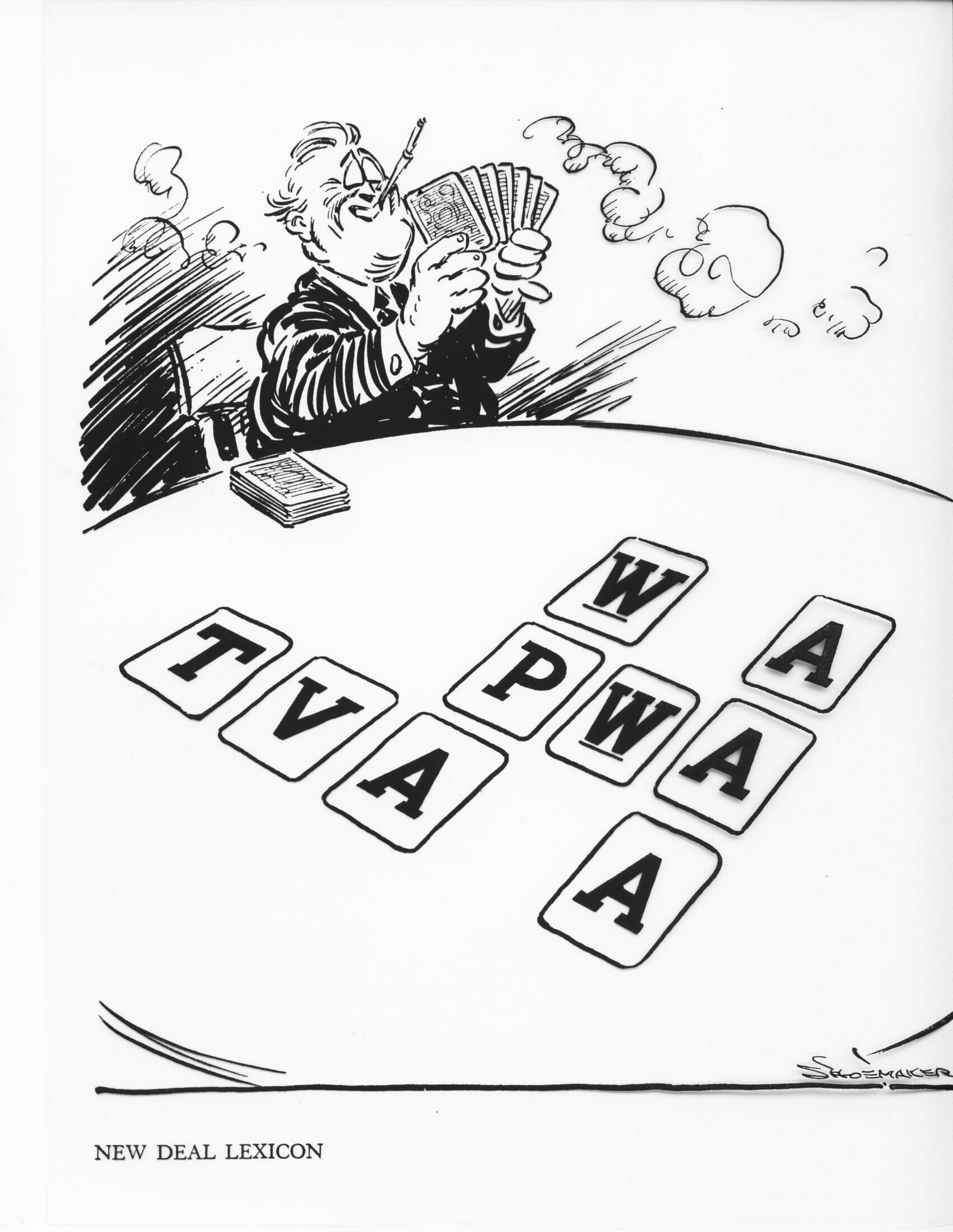
1935 cartoon by Vaughn Shoemaker in which he parodied the New Deal as a card game with alphabetical agencies

Roosevelt entered office with clear ideas for policies to address the Great Depression, though he remained open to experimentation as his presidency began implementing them. Among Roosevelt's more famous advisers was an informal "Brain Trust", a group that tended to view pragmatic government intervention in the economy positively. His choice for Secretary of Labor, Frances Perkins, greatly influenced his initiatives. Her list of what her priorities would be if she took the job illustrates: "a forty-hour workweek, a minimum wage, worker's compensation, unemployment compensation, a federal law banning child labor, direct federal aid for unemployment relief, Social Security, a revitalized public employment service and health insurance".

The New Deal policies drew from many different ideas proposed earlier in the 20th century. Assistant Attorney General Thurman Arnold led efforts that hearkened back to an anti-monopoly tradition rooted in American politics by figures such as Andrew Jackson and Thomas Jefferson. Supreme Court Justice Louis Brandeis, an influential adviser to many New Dealers, argued that "bigness" (referring, presumably, to corporations) was a negative economic force, producing waste and inefficiency. Other leaders such as Hugh S. Johnson of the NRA took ideas from the Woodrow Wilson Administration, advocating techniques used to mobilize the economy for World War I. They brought ideas and experience from the government controls and spending of 1917–1918. Other New Deal planners revived experiments suggested in the 1920s, such as the TVA. The "First New Deal" (1933–1934) encompassed the proposals offered by a wide spectrum of groups (not included was the Socialist Party, whose influence was all but destroyed). This first phase of the New Deal was also characterized by fiscal conservatism (see Economy Act, below) and experimentation with several different, sometimes contradictory, cures for economic ills.

Roosevelt created dozens of new agencies. They are traditionally and typically known to Americans by their alphabetical initials.

U.S. Vice President John Nance Garner would have a very prominent role in shaping the president's policies, with Roosevelt using Garner's knowledge and experience to pilot New Deal legislation through Congress. In 1933 alone, U.S. Senate Majority Leader Joseph T. Robinson would also propel legislation through the U.S. Senate.

=== The First 100 Days (1933) ===
The American people were generally extremely dissatisfied with the crumbling economy, mass unemployment, declining wages, and profits, and especially Herbert Hoover's policies such as the Smoot–Hawley Tariff Act and the Revenue Act of 1932. Roosevelt entered office with enormous political capital. Americans of all political persuasions were demanding immediate action and Roosevelt responded with a remarkable series of new programs in the "first hundred days" of the administration, in which he met with Congress for 100 days. During those 100 days of lawmaking, Congress granted every request Roosevelt asked and passed a few programs (such as the Federal Deposit Insurance Corporation to insure bank accounts) that he opposed. Ever since, presidents have been judged against Roosevelt for what they accomplished in their first 100 days. Walter Lippmann famously noted:

At the end of February we were a congeries of disorderly panic-stricken mobs and factions. In the hundred days from March to June, we became again an organized nation confident of our power to provide for our own security and to control our own destiny.

The economy had hit bottom in March 1933 and then started to expand. Economic indicators show the economy reached its lowest point in the first days of March, then began a steady, sharp upward recovery. Thus the Federal Reserve Index of Industrial Production sank to its lowest point of 52.8 in July 1932 and was practically unchanged at 54.3 in March 1933. However, by July 1933 it reached 85.5, a dramatic rebound of 57% in four months. Recovery was steady and strong until 1937. Except for employment, the economy by 1937 surpassed the levels of the late 1920s. The Recession of 1937 was a temporary downturn. Private sector employment, especially in manufacturing, recovered to the level of the 1920s but failed to advance further until the war. The U.S. population was 124,840,471 in 1932 and 128,824,829 in 1937, an increase of 3,984,468. The ratio of these numbers, times the number of jobs in 1932, means there was a need for 938,000 more jobs in 1937, to maintain the same employment level.

==== Fiscal policy ====
The Economy Act, drafted by Budget Director Lewis Williams Douglas, was passed on March 15, 1933. The act proposed to balance the "regular" (non-emergency) federal budget by cutting the salaries of government employees and cutting pensions to veterans by fifteen percent. It saved $500 million per year and reassured deficit hawks, such as Douglas, that the new president was fiscally conservative. Roosevelt argued there were two budgets: the "regular" federal budget, which he balanced; and the emergency budget, which was needed to defeat the depression. It was imbalanced on a temporary basis.

Roosevelt initially favored balancing the budget, but soon found himself running spending deficits to fund his numerous programs. However, Douglas—rejecting the distinction between a regular and emergency budget—resigned in 1934 and became an outspoken critic of the New Deal. Roosevelt strenuously opposed the Bonus Bill that would give World War I veterans a cash bonus. Congress finally passed it over his veto in 1936 and the Treasury distributed $1.5 billion in cash as bonus welfare benefits to 4 million veterans just before the 1936 election.

New Dealers never accepted the Keynesian argument for government spending as a vehicle for recovery. Most economists of the era, along with Henry Morgenthau of the Treasury Department, rejected Keynesian solutions and favored balanced budgets.

==== Banking reform ====
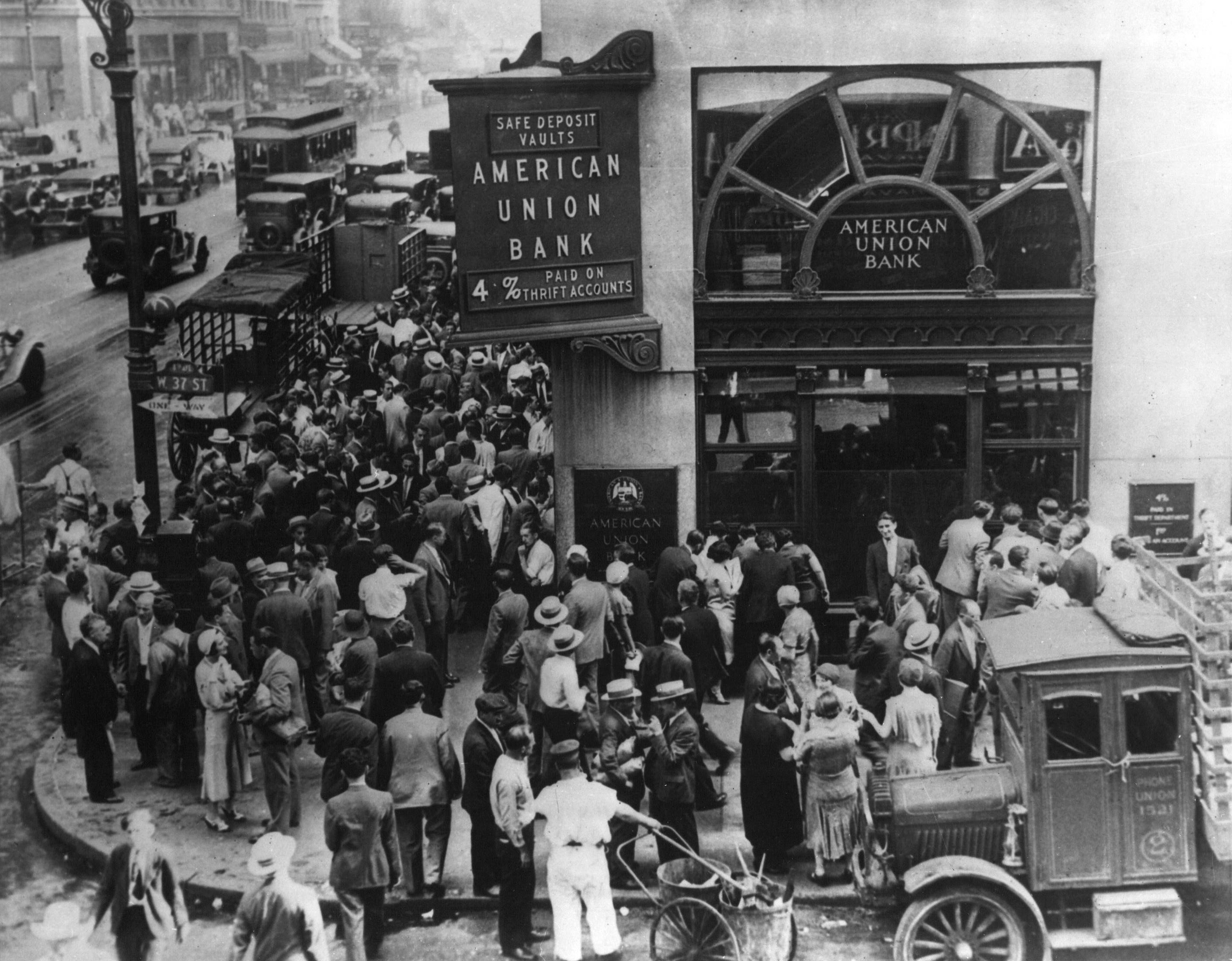
Crowd at New York's American Union Bank during a bank run early in the Great Depression

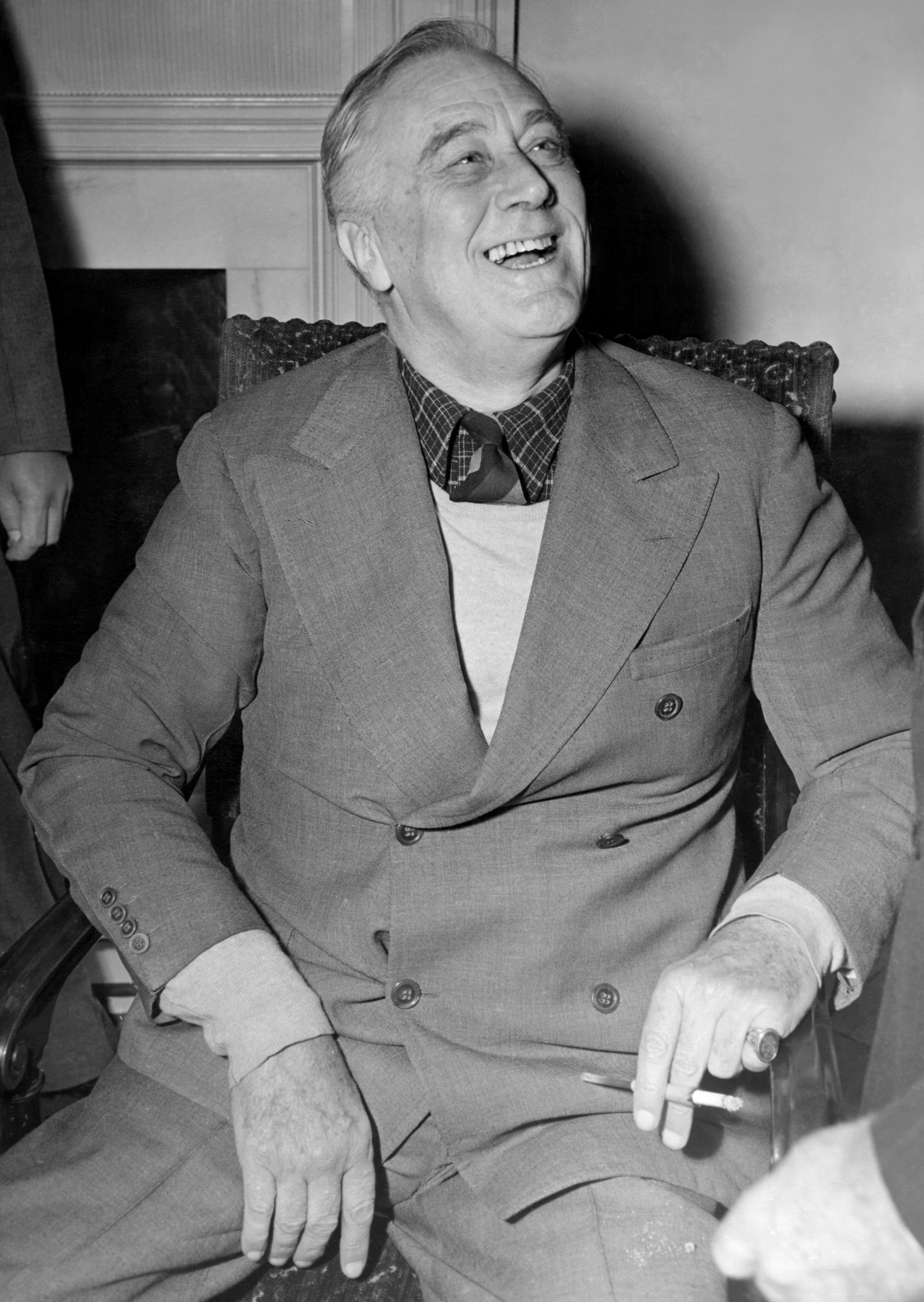
Roosevelt's ebullient public personality, conveyed through his declaration that "the only thing we have to fear is fear itself" and his fireside chats on radio, did a great deal to help restore the nation's confidence.

Fireside Chat 1 On the Banking Crisis
Roosevelt's first Fireside Chat on the Banking Crisis (March 12, 1933)

At the beginning of the Great Depression, the economy was destabilized by bank failures followed by credit crunches. The initial reasons were substantial losses in investment banking, followed by bank runs, which occur when a large number of customers withdraw their deposits because they believe the bank might become insolvent. As the bank run progressed, it generated a self-fulfilling prophecy: as more people withdrew their deposits, the likelihood of default increased and this encouraged further withdrawals.

Milton Friedman and Anna Schwartz have argued that the drain of money out of the banking system caused the monetary supply to shrink, forcing the economy to likewise shrink. As credit and economic activity diminished, price deflation followed, causing further economic contraction with disastrous impact on banks. Between 1929 and 1933, 40% of all banks (9,490 out of 23,697 banks) failed. Much of the Great Depression's economic damage was caused directly by bank runs.

Herbert Hoover had already considered a bank holiday to prevent further bank runs but rejected the idea because he was afraid to incite a panic. However, Roosevelt gave a radio address, held in the atmosphere of a Fireside Chat. He explained to the public in simple terms the causes of the banking crisis, what the government would do, and how the population could help. He closed all the banks in the country and kept them all closed until new legislation could be passed.

On March 9, 1933, Roosevelt sent to Congress the Emergency Banking Act, drafted in large part by Hoover's top advisors. The act was passed and signed into law the same day. It provided for a system of reopening sound banks under Treasury supervision, with federal loans available if needed. Three-quarters of the banks in the Federal Reserve System reopened within the next three days. Billions of dollars in hoarded currency and gold flowed back into them within a month, thus stabilizing the banking system. By the end of 1933, 4,004 small local banks were permanently closed and merged into larger banks. Their deposits totaled $3.6 billion. Depositors lost $540 million (equivalent to $1.3430591260×10^{10} in 2025) and eventually received on average 85 cents on the dollar of their deposits.

The Glass–Steagall Act limited commercial bank securities activities and affiliations between commercial banks and securities firms to regulate speculations. It also established the Federal Deposit Insurance Corporation (FDIC), which insured deposits for up to $2,500, ending the risk of runs on banks. This banking reform offered unprecedented stability because throughout the 1920s more than five hundred banks failed per year, and then it was less than ten banks per year after 1933.

By contrast, Canada did not have a single failure system during the Great Depression. This was true in great part because it fostered stability by allowing banks diversity by branching across provincial lines. Historian David T. Beito has criticized FDR for failing to oppose a filibuster by Senator Huey Long against a bill by Senator Carter Glass during the interregnum period permitting banks to branch across state lines. "Had FDR or Hoover vigorously pushed the Canadian branch banking model," writes Beito, "and done it much earlier, the course of the financial crisis during the transition might have been much less bleak.

==== Monetary reform ====
Under the gold standard, the United States kept the dollar convertible to gold. The Federal Reserve would have had to execute an expansionary monetary policy to fight the deflation and to inject liquidity into the banking system to prevent it from crumbling—but lower interest rates would have led to a gold outflow. Under the gold standards, price–specie flow mechanism countries that lost gold, but nevertheless wanted to maintain the gold standard, had to permit their money supply to decrease and the domestic price level to decline (deflation). As long as the Federal Reserve had to defend the gold parity of the dollar it had to sit idle while the banking system crumbled.

In March and April in a series of laws and executive orders, the government suspended the gold standard. Roosevelt stopped the outflow of gold by forbidding the export of gold except under license from the Treasury. Anyone holding significant amounts of gold coinage was mandated to exchange it for the existing fixed price of U.S. dollars. The Treasury no longer paid out gold for dollars and gold would no longer be considered valid legal tender for debts in private and public contracts.

The dollar was allowed to float freely on foreign exchange markets with no guaranteed price in gold. With the passage of the Gold Reserve Act in 1934, the nominal price of gold was changed from $20.67 per troy ounce to $35. These measures enabled the Federal Reserve to increase the amount of money in circulation to the level the economy needed. Markets immediately responded well to the suspension in the hope that the decline in prices would finally end. In her essay "What ended the Great Depression?" (1992), Christina Romer argued that this policy raised industrial production by 25% until 1937 and by 50% until 1942.

==== Securities Act of 1933 ====
Before the Wall Street Crash of 1929, securities were unregulated at the federal level. Even firms whose securities were publicly traded published no regular reports, or even worse, rather misleading reports based on arbitrarily selected data. To avoid another crash, the Securities Act of 1933 was passed. It required the disclosure of the balance sheet, profit and loss statement, and the names and compensations of corporate officers for firms whose securities were traded. Additionally, the reports had to be verified by independent auditors. In 1934, the U.S. Securities and Exchange Commission was established to regulate the stock market and prevent corporate abuses relating to corporate reporting and the sale of securities.

==== Repeal of Prohibition ====
In a measure that garnered substantial popular support for his New Deal, Roosevelt moved to put to rest one of the most divisive cultural issues of the 1920s. He signed the bill to legalize the manufacture and sale of alcohol, an interim measure pending the repeal of prohibition, for which a constitutional amendment of repeal (the 21st) was already in process. The repeal amendment was ratified later in 1933. States and cities gained additional new revenue and Roosevelt secured his popularity especially in the cities and ethnic areas by legalizing alcohol.

=== Relief ===
Relief was the immediate effort to help the one-third of the population that was hardest hit by the depression. Relief was also aimed at providing temporary help to suffering and unemployed Americans. Local and state budgets were sharply reduced because of falling tax revenue, but New Deal relief programs were used not just to hire the unemployed but also to build needed schools, municipal buildings, waterworks, sewers, streets, and parks according to local specifications. While the regular Army and Navy budgets were reduced, Roosevelt juggled relief funds to provide for their claimed needs. All of the CCC camps were directed by army officers, whose salaries came from the relief budget. The PWA built numerous warships, including two aircraft carriers; all the money came from the PWA agency. PWA also built warplanes, and the WPA built military bases and airfields.

==== Public works ====
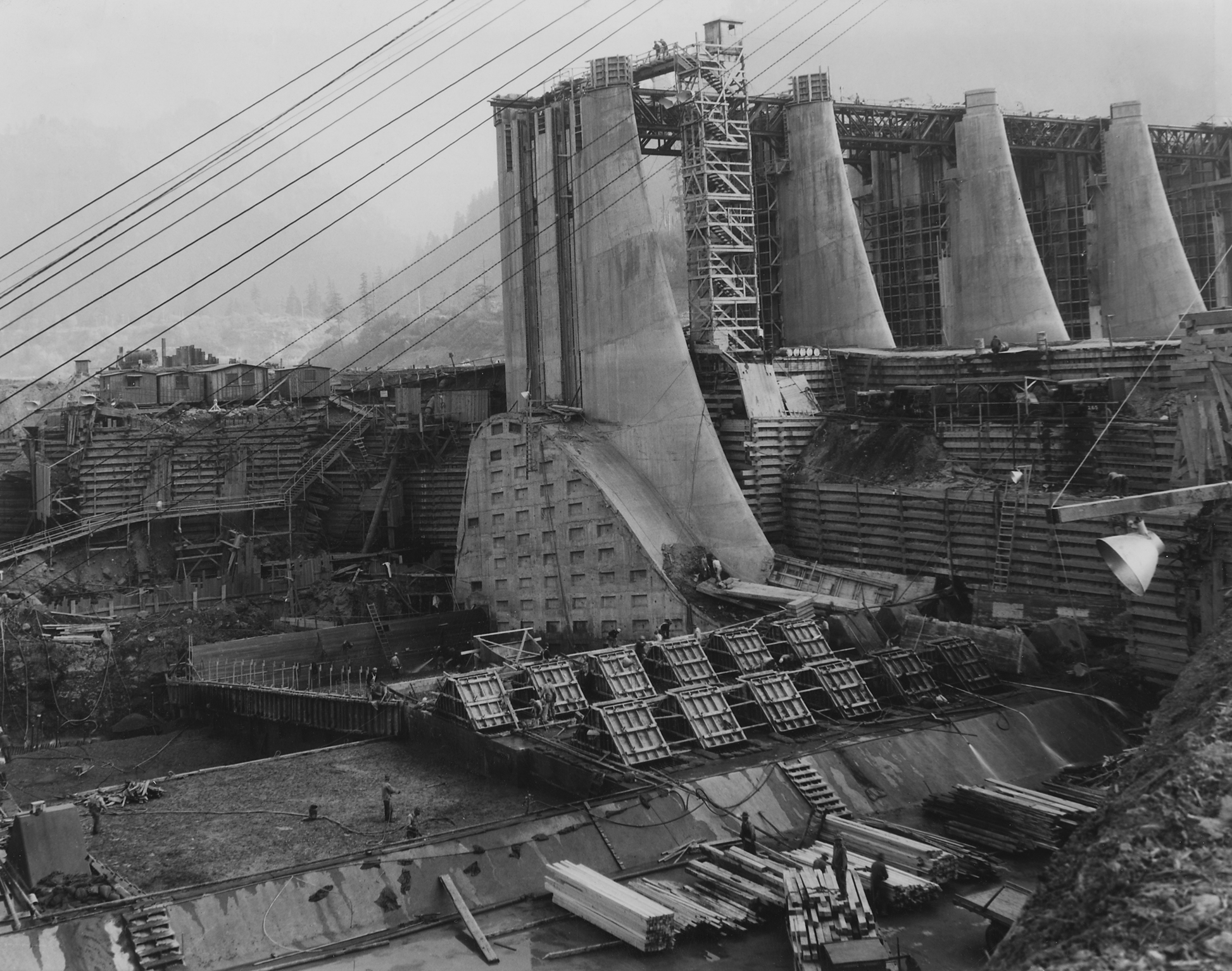
Public Works Administration Project Bonneville Dam

To prime the pump and cut unemployment, the NIRA created the Public Works Administration (PWA), a major program of public works, which organized and provided funds for the building of useful works such as government buildings, airports, hospitals, schools, roads, bridges, and dams. From 1933 to 1935, PWA spent $3.3 billion with private companies to build 34,599 projects, many of them quite large. The NIRA also contained a provision for the "construction, reconstruction, alteration, or repair under public regulation or control of low-cost housing and slum-clearance projects".

Many unemployed people were put to work under Roosevelt on a variety of government-financed public works projects, including the construction of bridges, airports, dams, post offices, hospitals, and hundreds of thousands of miles of road. Through reforestation and flood control, they reclaimed millions of hectares of soil from erosion and devastation. As noted by one authority, Roosevelt's New Deal "was literally stamped on the American landscape".

==== Farm and rural programs ====
The rural U.S. was a high priority for Roosevelt and his energetic Secretary of Agriculture, Henry A. Wallace. Roosevelt believed that full economic recovery depended upon the recovery of agriculture and raising farm prices was a major tool, even though it meant higher food prices for the poor living in cities.

Many rural people lived in severe poverty, especially in the South. Major programs addressed to their needs included the Resettlement Administration (RA), the Rural Electrification Administration (REA), rural welfare projects sponsored by the WPA, National Youth Administration (NYA), Forest Service and Civilian Conservation Corps (CCC), including school lunches, building new schools, opening roads in remote areas, reforestation and purchase of marginal lands to enlarge national forests.

In 1933, the Roosevelt administration launched the Tennessee Valley Authority, a project involving dam construction planning on an unprecedented scale to curb flooding, generate electricity, and modernize poor farms in the Tennessee Valley region of the Southern United States. Under the Farmers' Relief Act of 1933, the government paid compensation to farmers who reduced output, thereby raising prices. Because of this legislation, the average income of farmers almost doubled by 1937.

In the 1920s, farm production had increased dramatically thanks to mechanization, more potent insecticides, and increased use of fertilizer. Due to an overproduction of agricultural products, farmers faced severe and chronic agricultural depression throughout the 1920s. The Great Depression even worsened the agricultural crises and, at the beginning of 1933, agricultural markets nearly faced collapse. Farm prices were so low that in Montana wheat was rotting in the fields because it could not be profitably harvested. In Oregon, sheep were slaughtered and left to rot because meat prices were not sufficient to warrant transportation to markets.

Roosevelt was keenly interested in farm issues and believed that true prosperity would not return until farming was prosperous. Many different programs were directed at farmers. The first 100 days produced the Farm Security Act to raise farm incomes by raising the prices farmers received, which was achieved by reducing total farm output. The Agricultural Adjustment Act created the Agricultural Adjustment Administration (AAA) in May 1933. The act reflected the demands of leaders of major farm organizations (especially the Farm Bureau) and reflected debates among Roosevelt's farm advisers such as Secretary of Agriculture Henry A. Wallace, M.L. Wilson, Rexford Tugwell and George Peek.

The AAA aimed to raise prices for commodities through artificial scarcity. The AAA used a system of domestic allotments, setting total output of corn, cotton, dairy products, hogs, rice, tobacco, and wheat. The farmers themselves had a voice in the process of using the government to benefit their incomes. The AAA paid land owners subsidies for leaving some of their land idle with funds provided by a new tax on food processing. To force up farm prices to the point of "parity", 10 million acres (40,000 km^{2}) of growing cotton was plowed up, bountiful crops were left to rot and six million piglets were killed and discarded.

The idea was to give farmers a "fair exchange value" for their products in relation to the general economy ("parity level"). Farm incomes and the income for the general population recovered fast since the beginning of 1933. Food prices remained still well below the 1929 peak. The AAA established an important and long-lasting federal role in the planning of the entire agricultural sector of the economy and was the first program on such a scale for the troubled agricultural economy. The original AAA targeted landowners, and therefore did not provide for any sharecroppers or tenants or farm laborers who might become unemployed.

A Gallup poll printed in The Washington Post revealed that a majority of the American public opposed the AAA. In 1936, the Supreme Court declared the AAA to be unconstitutional, stating, "a statutory plan to regulate and control agricultural production, [is] a matter beyond the powers delegated to the federal government". The AAA was replaced by a similar program that did win Court approval. Instead of paying farmers for letting fields lie barren, this program subsidized them for planting soil-enriching crops such as alfalfa that would not be sold on the market. Federal regulation of agricultural production has been modified many times since then, but together with large subsidies is still in effect.

A number of other measures affecting rural areas were introduced under Roosevelt. The National Industrial Recovery Act of 1933 included subsistence homestead provisions providing (as noted by one study) "100-acre farm plots and homes to the unemployed for non-commercial farming." The Bankhead Cotton Control Act of 1934 placed mandatory limits on the number of bales a farmer could produce and received support from most farmers who wanted to see higher prices. The Farm Credit Act of 1933 authorized farmers "to organize a nationwide system of local credit cooperatives -- production credit associations -- to make operating credit readily accessible to farmers throughout the country." The Farm Mortgage Foreclosure Act of 1934 provided for debt reduction and the redemption of foreclosed farms, and the Homestead Settler's Act of 1934 liberalized homestead residence requirements. The Farm Research Act of 1935 included various provisions such as the development of cooperative agricultural extension, and the Commodity Exchange Act of 1936 enabled "the Commodity Credit Corporation to better serve the needs of farmers in orderly marketing, and provided credit and facilities for carrying surpluses from season to season". The Farmers Mortgage Amendatory Act of 1936 authorized the Reconstruction Finance Corporation to make loans to drainage, levee, and irrigation districts, while under the Soil Conservation and Domestic Allotment Act of 1936 payments to farmers to encourage conservation were authorized. In 1937, the Water Facilities Act was enacted "to provide loans for individuals and association farm water systems in 17 Western states where drought and water shortage were familiar hardships."

The Bankhead–Jones Farm Tenant Act of 1937 was the last major New Deal legislation that concerned farming. It created the Farm Security Administration (FSA), which replaced the Resettlement Administration.

The Food Stamp Plan, a major new welfare program for urban poor, was established in 1939 to provide stamps to poor people who could use them to purchase food at retail outlets. The program ended during wartime prosperity in 1943 but was restored in 1961. It survived into the 21st century with little controversy because it was seen to benefit the urban poor, food producers, grocers, wholesalers, and farmers, so it gained support from both progressive and conservative Congressmen. In 2013, Tea Party activists in the House nonetheless tried to end the program, now known as the Supplemental Nutrition Assistance Program, while the Senate fought to preserve it.

==== Youth programs ====
Unemployment was very high among young men. The New Deal had several major programs oriented toward youth. The first--and by far the most visible and popular--was the Civilian Conservation Corps (CCC) that reached three million unemployed young men age 17 to 28 whose families were on relief. They spent six months in construction camps, and were provided food, clothing and medical care, but labor unions insisted there be no training in specialized skills. Their parents were paid $25 a month. There was a similar program for Indian reservations. Large numbers of African Americans worked in segregated CCC units. The National Youth Administration (NYA) provided funding for work-study programs for students (including young women) in high schools and colleges; the Aid to Dependent Children (ADC) gave cash payments to millions of poor parents. Previously many very poor parents had placed their children in orphanages; the new program resulted in the shrinkage or closure of many orphanages. In addition, laws against child labor were tightened, forcing some youth into unemployment. President Roosevelt got along poorly with the educational establishment, whose leaders called for closing the CCC and NYA. Therefore there was no direct aid to education. However, the work relief programs such as PWA and WPA cooperated with local government to build many new public schools and playgrounds.

=== Recovery ===
Recovery was the effort in numerous programs to restore the economy to normal levels. By most economic indicators, this was achieved by 1937—except for unemployment, which remained stubbornly high until World War II began. Recovery was designed to help the economy bounce back from depression. Economic historians led by Price Fishback have examined the impact of New Deal spending on improving health conditions in the 114 largest cities, 1929–1937. They estimated that every additional $153,000 in relief spending (in 1935 dollars, or $1.95 million in the year 2000 dollars) was associated with a reduction of one infant death, one suicide, and 2.4 deaths from infectious diseases.

==== NRA "Blue Eagle" campaign ====
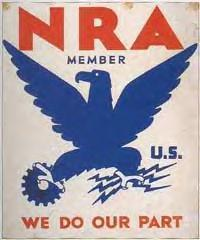
National Recovery Administration Blue Eagle

Manufacturing employment in the U.S. from 1920 to 1940

From 1929 to 1933, the industrial economy suffered from a vicious cycle of deflation. Since 1931, the U.S. Chamber of Commerce, the voice of the nation's organized business, promoted an anti-deflationary scheme that would permit trade associations to cooperate in government-instigated cartels to stabilize prices within their industries. Though existing antitrust laws clearly forbade such practices, the organized business were entertained by the Roosevelt Administration.

Roosevelt's advisors believed that excessive competition and technical progress had led to overproduction and lowered wages and prices, which they believed lowered demand and employment (deflation). He argued that government economic planning was necessary to remedy this. New Deal economists argued that cut-throat competition had hurt many businesses and that with prices having fallen 20% and more, "deflation" exacerbated the burden of debt and would delay recovery. They rejected a strong move in Congress to limit the workweek to 30 hours. Instead, their remedy, designed in cooperation with big business, was the National Industrial Recovery Act (NIRA). It included stimulus funds for the WPA to spend and sought to raise prices, give more bargaining power for unions (so the workers could purchase more), and reduce harmful competition.

At the center of the NIRA was the National Recovery Administration (NRA), headed by former General Hugh S. Johnson, who had been a senior economic official in World War I. Johnson called on every business establishment in the nation to accept a stopgap "blanket code": a minimum wage of between 20 and 45 cents per hour, a maximum workweek of 35–45 hours and the abolition of child labor. Johnson and Roosevelt contended that the "blanket code" would raise consumer purchasing power and increase employment. To mobilize political support for the NRA, Johnson launched the "NRA Blue Eagle" publicity campaign to boost what he called "industrial self-government". The NRA brought together leaders in each industry to design specific sets of codes for that industry—the most important provisions were anti-deflationary floors below which no company would lower prices or wages and agreements on maintaining employment and production. In a remarkably short time, the NRA announced agreements from almost every major industry in the nation. By March 1934, industrial production was 45% higher than in March 1933.

NRA Administrator Hugh Johnson was showing signs of a mental breakdown due to the extreme pressure and workload of running the National Recovery Administration. Johnson lost power in September 1934, but kept his title. Roosevelt replaced his position with a new National Industrial Recovery Board, of which Donald Richberg was named Executive Director.

On May 27, 1935, the NRA was found to be unconstitutional by a unanimous decision of the U.S. Supreme Court in the case of A.L.A. Schechter Poultry Corp. v. United States. After the end of the NRA, quotas in the oil industry were fixed by the Railroad Commission of Texas with Tom Connally's federal Hot Oil Act of 1935, which guaranteed that illegal "hot oil" would not be sold. By the time NRA ended in May 1935, well over 2 million employers accepted the new standards laid down by the NRA, which had introduced a minimum wage and an eight-hour workday, together with abolishing child labor. These standards were reintroduced by the Fair Labor Standards Act of 1938.

Historian William E. Leuchtenburg argued in 1963:

The NRA could boast some considerable achievements: it gave jobs to some two million workers; it helped stop a renewal of the deflationary spiral that had almost wrecked the nation; it did something to improve business ethics and civilize competition; it established a national pattern of maximum hours and minimum wages; and it all but wiped out child labor and the sweatshop. But this was all it did. It prevented things from getting worse, but it did little to speed recovery, and probably actually hindered it by its support of restrictionism and price raising. The NRA could maintain a sense of national interest against private interests only so long as the spirit of national crisis prevailed. As it faded, restriction-minded businessmen moved into a decisive position of authority. By delegating power over price and production to trade associations, the NRA created a series of private economic governments.

Other labor measures were carried out under the First New Deal. The Wagner-Peyser Act of 1933 established a national system of public employment offices, and the Anti-Kickback Act of 1934 "established penalties for employers on Government contracts who induce employees to return any part of pay to which they are entitled". That same year, the Railway Labor Act of 1926 was amended "to outlaw company unions and yellow dog contracts, and to provide that the majority of any craft or class of employees shall determine who shall represent them in collective bargaining". In July 1933, Secretary of Labor Frances Perkins held at the Department of Labor what was described as "a very successful conference of 16 state minimum wage boards (some of the states had minimum wage laws long before the Federal Government)". The following year she held a two-day conference on state labor legislation in which 39 states were represented. According to one study, "State officials in attendance were gratified that the U.S. Department of Labor was showing interest in their problems. They called on Perkins to make the labor legislation conferences an annual event. She did so and participated actively in them every year until she left office. The conferences continued under Labor Department auspices for another ten years, by which time they had largely accomplished their goal of improving and standardizing state labor laws and administration." As a means of institutionalizing the work she tried to achieve with these conferences, Perkins established the Division of Labor Standards (which was later redesignated a bureau) in 1934 as a service agency and informational clearinghouse for state governments and other federal agencies. Its goal was to promote (through voluntary means) improved conditions of work, and the Division "offered many services in addition to helping the states deal with administrative problems". It offered, for instance, training for factory inspectors, and drew national attention "to the area of workers' health with a series of conferences on silicosis. This wide-spread lung disease had been dramatized by the 'Gauley Bridge Disaster' in which hundreds of tunnel workers died from breathing silica-filled air. The Division also worked with unions, whose support was needed in passing labor legislation in the States."

The Muscle Shoals Act contained various provisions of interest to labor, including prevailing wage rate and workmen's compensation. A resolution approved by the Senate, June 13, authorized the President to accept membership for the Government of the United States in the International Labor Organization, without assuming any obligation under the covenant of the League of Nations. The resolution was approved by the House, June 16, by a vote of 232 to 109. Public Act 448 amended the Federal Employees' Civil Service Retirement Act of 1930 by, as noted by one study, "giving to the employee the right to name a beneficiary irrespective of the amount to his credit without the need of an appointment of an administrator". Public Act No. 245 "provided for the development of vocational education in the States by appropriating funds for the fiscal years 1935, 1936 and 1937, and Public Act 296 amended the United States Bankruptcy Act with safeguards for labor. Public Act No. 349 provided for hourly rates of pay for substitute laborers in the mail service and time credits when appointed as regular laborers, and Public Act No. 461 authorized the President to create a "federal prison industries", in which inmates hereafter "receiving injuries while in the course of their employment will receive the benefits of compensation, limited however to that amount prescribed in the Federal Employees' Compensation Act". Public Act No. 467 created a Federal Credit Union Law, one of the main purposes of which was to make a system of credit for provident purposes available to people of small means. For those in the District of Columbia, an Act concerning fire escapes on certain buildings was amended by Public Act No. 284."

==== Housing sector ====
The New Deal had an important impact on the housing field. The New Deal followed and increased President Hoover's lead-and-seek measures. The New Deal sought to stimulate the private home building industry and increase the number of individuals who owned homes. The Public Works Administration of the Interior Department planned to construct public housing across the country, providing low-rent apartments for low-income families. However resistance from the private housing sector was strong except in New York city, which welcomed the program. Furthermore, the White House reallocated most of the funding into relief projects, where each million federal dollars would create more jobs for the unemployed. As a result by 1937 there were only 49 projects nationwide, containing about 21,800 apartments. It was taken over in 1938 by the Federal Housing Administration (FHA). Starting in 1933 the New Deal operated the new Home Owners' Loan Corporation (HOLC) that helped finance mortgages on private houses.

===== Programs =====
HOLC set uniform national appraisal methods and simplified the mortgage process. The Federal Housing Administration (FHA) created national standards for home construction. In 1934 the Alley Dwelling Authority was established by Congress "to provide for the discontinuation of the use as dwellings of the buildings situated in alleys in the District of Columbia". That year, a National Housing Act was approved which was aimed at improving employment while making private credit available for repairing and homebuilding. In 1938 this act was amended and as noted by one study "provision was made renewing the insurance on repair loans, for insuring mortgages up to 90 percent of the value of small-owner –occupied homes, and for insuring mortgages on rental property".

===== Redlining =====
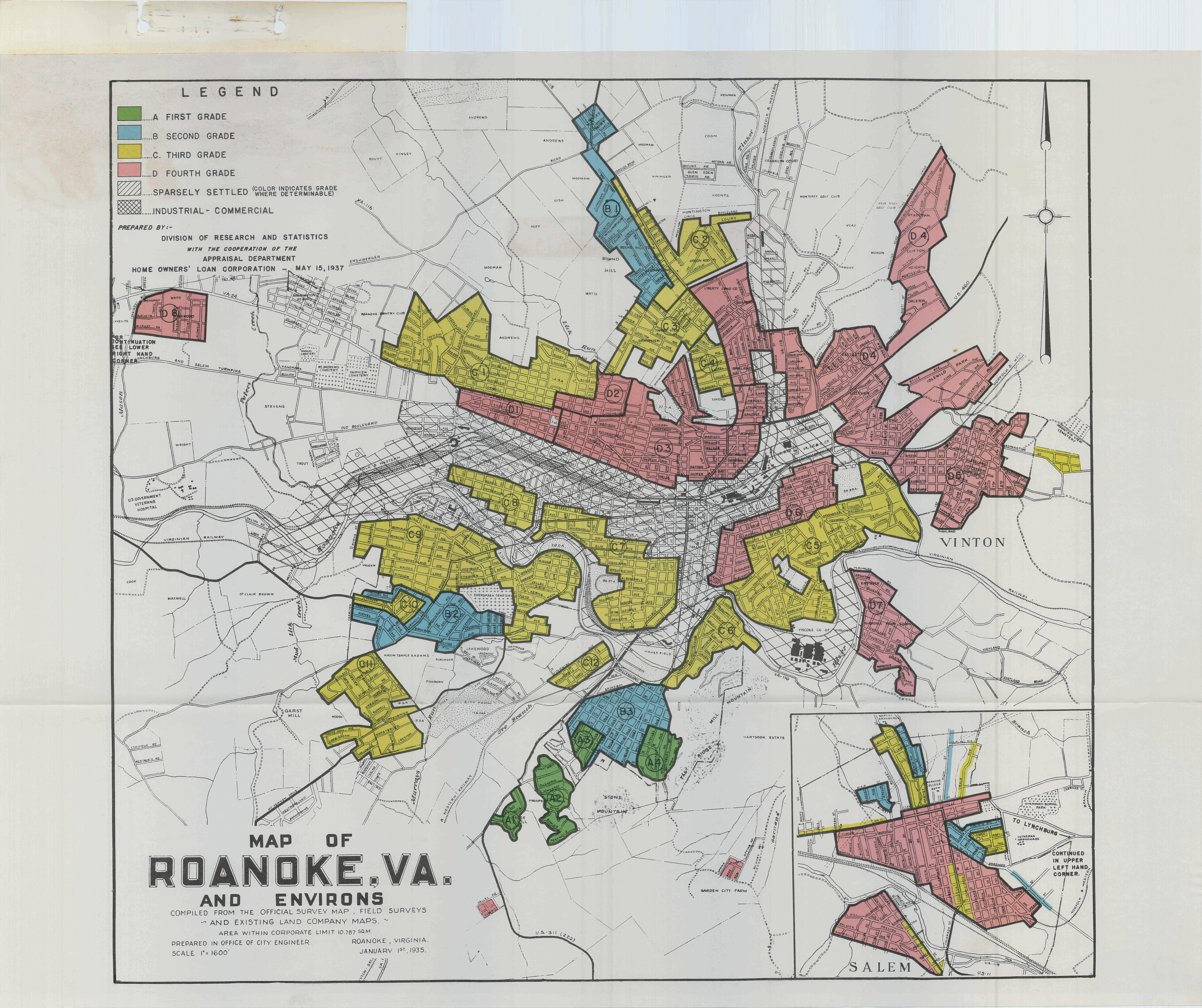
Roanoke, Virginia HOLC redlining map

This also marked the beginning of discriminatory redlining within the United states under the HOLC. Their maps broadly determined what housing loans would be backed by the federal government. Though other criteria existed, the most major criterion was race. Any neighborhood with "inharmonious racial groups" would either be marked red or yellow, depending on the proportion of black residents. This was explicitly stated within the FHA underwriting manual that the HOLC used as a guideline for its maps.

Alongside other discriminatory housing policy, this meant in practice that Black Americans were denied federally backed mortgages locking most out of the housing market and all Americans were denied backing for any loans within black neighborhood. Lastly, for the other policies in place meant for neighborhood building projects, the federal government required they be explicitly segregated to be backed. The federal government's financial backing also required the use of racially restrictive covenants, that banned white homeowners from reselling their house to any black buyers.

=== Reform ===
Reform was based on the assumption that the depression was caused by the inherent instability of the market and that government intervention was necessary to rationalize and stabilize the economy and to balance the interests of farmers, business, and labor. Reforms targeted the causes of the depression and sought to prevent a crisis like it from happening again. In other words, this sought to financially rebuild the U.S. while ensuring not to repeat history.

==== Trade liberalization ====
Most economic historians assert that protectionist policies, culminating in the Smoot-Hawley Act of 1930, worsened the Depression. Roosevelt already spoke against the act while campaigning for president during 1932. In 1934, the Reciprocal Tariff Act was drafted by Cordell Hull. It gave the president power to negotiate bilateral, reciprocal trade agreements with other countries. The act enabled Roosevelt to liberalize American trade policy around the globe and it is widely credited with ushering in the era of liberal trade policy that persists to this day.

==== Puerto Rico ====
The Puerto Rico Reconstruction Administration oversaw a separate set of programs in Puerto Rico. It promoted land reform and helped small farms, it set up farm cooperatives, promoted crop diversification, and helped the local industry.

== Second New Deal (1935–1936) ==
In the spring of 1935, responding to the setbacks in the Court, a new skepticism in Congress, and the growing popular clamor for more dramatic action, New Dealers passed important new initiatives. Historians refer to them as the "Second New Deal" and note that it was more progressive and more controversial than the "First New Deal" of 1933–1934.

=== Social Security Act ===
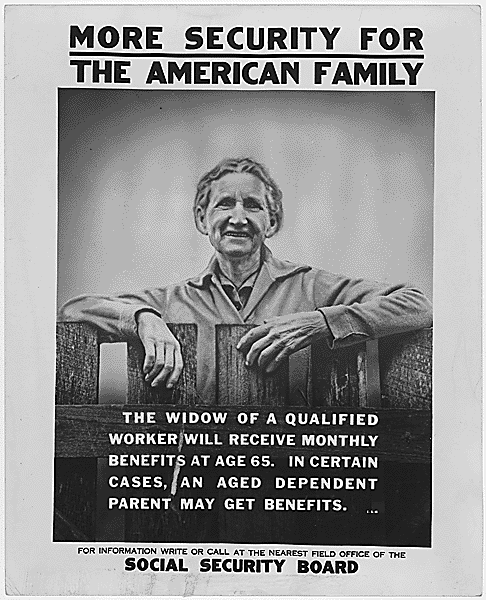
A poster publicizing Social Security benefits

Until 1935, only a dozen states had implemented old-age insurance, and these programs were woefully underfunded. Just one state (Wisconsin) had an insurance program. The United States was the only modern industrial country where people faced the Depression without any national system of social security. The work programs of the "First New Deal" such as CWA and FERA were designed for immediate relief, for a year or two.

The most important program of 1935, and perhaps of the New Deal itself, was the Social Security Act. It established a permanent system of universal retirement pensions (Social Security), unemployment insurance and welfare benefits for the handicapped and needy children in families without a father present. It established the framework for the U.S. welfare system. Roosevelt insisted that it should be funded by payroll taxes rather than from the general fund—he said: "We put those payroll contributions there so as to give the contributors a legal, moral, and political right to collect their pensions and unemployment benefits. With those taxes in there, no damn politician can ever scrap my social security program".

=== Labor relations ===
The National Labor Relations Act of 1935, also known as the Wagner Act, finally guaranteed workers the rights to collective bargaining through unions of their own choice. The Act also established the National Labor Relations Board (NLRB) to facilitate wage agreements and to suppress the repeated labor disturbances. The Wagner Act did not compel employers to reach agreement with their employees, but it opened possibilities for American labor. The result was a tremendous growth of membership in the labor unions, especially in the mass-production sector, led by the older and larger American Federation of Labor and the new, more radical Congress of Industrial Organizations. Labor thus became a major component of the New Deal political coalition. However, the intense battle for members between the AFL and the CIO coalitions weakened labor's power.

To help agricultural labor, the 1934 Jones-Costigan Act included provisions such as the prohibition of child labor under the age of 14, limiting the working hours of children aged 14–16, and the granting to the USDA "the authority to fix minimum wages, but only after holding public hearings 'at a place accessible to producers and workers'". In addition, the Act called for farmers "to pay their workers 'promptly' and 'in full' before collecting their benefit payments as a way to deal with the historic inequalities embedded in staggered payments and hold-back clauses". This Act was replaced by the 1937 Sugar Act after the Supreme Court ruled the AAA unconstitutional. In passing the Act, Congress not only followed Roosevelt's advice by continuing the previous Act's labor provisions but strengthened them. As noted by one study, the Act "once again prohibited child labor and made the 'fair, reasonable and equitable' minimum wage determinations mandatory". The Public Contracts (Walsh-Healey) Act of 1936 established labor standards on government contracts, "including minimum wages, overtime compensation for hours in excess of 8 a day or 40 a week, child and convict labor provisions, and health and safety requirements". The Anti-Strikebreaker (Byrnes) Act from that same year declared it unlawful "to transport or aid in transporting strikebreakers in interstate or foreign commerce".

The Davis-Bacon Act Amendment (Public Act 403) was approved in August 1935, "Establishing prevailing wages for mechanics and laborers employed on public buildings and public works". Under the Miller Act of 1935, as noted by one study, "every construction worker or person who furnished material on a covered contract has the right to sue the contractor or surety if not fully paid within 90 days after performing labor or furnishing such material". The Motor Carrier Act of 1935, as noted by one study, "authorized the Interstate Commerce Commission to limit the hours of service and to prescribe other measures to safeguard motor carrier employees and passengers, as well as the users of highways generally". The Merchant Marine Act of 1936 directed the Maritime Commission "to investigate and specify suitable wage and manning scales and working conditions with respect to subsidized ships". Public Act 783 of March 1936 sought to extend "the facilities of the Public Health Service to seamen on Government vessels not in the military or Naval establishments". The Railway Labor Act Amendment (Public Act 487) was approved in April 1936, "Extending protection of Railway Labor Act to employees of air transportation companies engaged in interstate and foreign commerce".

The Bituminous Coal Act of 1937 contained various labor provisions such as prohibiting "requiring an employee or applicant for employment to join a company union". A national Railroad Retirement program was introduced that year, which in 1938 also introduced unemployment benefits. The Randolph-Sheppard Act provided for "licensing of blind persons to operate vending stands in Federal buildings". Public Law No. 814 of the 74th Congress, as noted by one study, conferred jurisdiction "upon each of the several states to extend the provisions of their State workmen's compensation laws to employments on Federal property and premises located within the respective States". The National Apprenticeship Act of 1937 established standards for apprenticeship programs. The Chandler Act of 1938 allowed wage earners "to extend debt payments over longer periods of time." That same year the Interstate Commerce Commission "issued an order regulating the hours of drivers of motor vehicles engaged in interstate commerce". The Wagner-O'Day Act in 1938 set up a program "designed to increase employment opportunities for persons who are blind so they could manufacture and sell their goods to the federal government".

Public Act No. 702 provided an 8-hour day for officers and seamen on certain vessels that navigated the Great Lakes and adjacent waters, and the Second Deficiency Appropriation Act (Public, No. 723) contained an appropriation for investigating labor conditions in Hawaii. Public Act No. 706 provided for the preservation of the right of air carrier employees "to obtain higher compensation and better working conditions so as to conform to a decision of the National Labor Board of May 10, 1934 (No. 83). Under Public Act No. 486 the provisions of section 13 of the air-mail act of 1934 "relating to pay, working conditions, and relations of pilots and other employees shall apply to all contracts awarded under the act". A number of laws affecting federal employees were also enacted. An act of 1936, for instance, provided vacations and accumulated leaves for Government employees, and another 1936 act provided for accumulated sick leave with pay for Government employees.

The Fair Labor Standards Act of 1938 set maximum hours (44 per week) and minimum wages (25 cents per hour) for most categories of workers. Child labor of children under the age of 16 was forbidden and children under 18 years were forbidden to work in hazardous employment. As a result, the wages of 300,000 workers, especially in the South, were increased and the hours of 1.3 million were reduced.

=== Consumer rights ===
Various laws were also passed to advance consumer rights. In 1935 the Public Utility Holding Company Act of 1935 was passed "to protect consumers and investors from abuses by holding companies with interests in gas and electric utilities". The Federal Power Act of 1935 sought "to protect customers and to assure reasonableness in the provision of a service essential to life in modern society". The Natural Gas Act of 1938 sought to protect consumers "against exploitation at the hands of natural gas companies". The Food, Drug and Cosmetic Act of 1938 granted to the Food and Drug Administration "the power to test and license drugs and to test the safety of cosmetics, and to the Department of Agriculture the authority to set food quality standards." In addition, the Wheeler-Lea Act "gave the Free Trade Commission, an old Progressive agency, the power to prohibit unfair and deceptive business acts or practices."

=== Works Progress Administration ===
Works Progress Administration (WPA) poster promoting the LaGuardia Airport project (1937)

Roosevelt nationalized unemployment relief through the Works Progress Administration (WPA), headed by close friend Harry Hopkins. Roosevelt had insisted that the projects had to be costly in terms of labor, beneficial in the long term and the WPA was forbidden to compete with private enterprises—therefore the workers had to be paid smaller wages. The Works Progress Administration (WPA) was created to return the unemployed to the workforce. The WPA financed a variety of projects such as hospitals, schools, and roads, and employed more than 8.5 million workers who built 650,000 miles of highways and roads, 125,000 public buildings as well as bridges, reservoirs, irrigation systems, parks, playgrounds and so on.

Prominent projects were the Lincoln Tunnel, the Triborough Bridge, the LaGuardia Airport, the Overseas Highway and the San Francisco–Oakland Bay Bridge. The Rural Electrification Administration used cooperatives to bring electricity to rural areas, many of which still operate. Between 1935 and 1940, the percentage of rural homes lacking electricity fell from 90% to 40.% The National Youth Administration was another semi-autonomous WPA program for youth. Its Texas director, Lyndon B. Johnson, later used the NYA as a model for some of his Great Society programs in the 1960s. The WPA was organized by states, but New York City had its own branch Federal One, which created jobs for writers, musicians, artists and theater personnel. It became a hunting ground for conservatives searching for communist employees.

The Federal Writers' Project operated in every state, where it created a famous guide book—it also catalogued local archives and hired many writers, including Margaret Walker, Zora Neale Hurston and Anzia Yezierska, to document folklore. Other writers interviewed elderly ex-slaves and recorded their stories.

Under the Federal Theater Project, headed by Hallie Flanagan, actresses and actors, technicians, writers and directors put on stage productions. The tickets were inexpensive or sometimes free, making theater available to audiences unaccustomed to attending plays.

One Federal Art Project paid 162 trained woman artists on relief to paint murals or create statues for newly built post offices and courthouses. Many of these works of art can still be seen in public buildings around the country, along with murals sponsored by the Treasury Relief Art Project of the Treasury Department. During its existence, the Federal Theatre Project provided jobs for circus people, musicians, actors, artists, and playwrights, together with increasing public appreciation of the arts.

=== Tax policy ===
In 1935, Roosevelt called for a tax program called the Wealth Tax Act (Revenue Act of 1935) to redistribute wealth. The bill imposed an income tax of 79% on incomes over $5 million. Since that was an extraordinarily high income in the 1930s, the highest tax rate actually covered just one individual—John D. Rockefeller. The bill was expected to raise only about $250 million in additional funds, so revenue was not the primary goal. Morgenthau called it "more or less a campaign document". In a private conversation with Raymond Moley, Roosevelt admitted that the purpose of the bill was "stealing Huey Long's thunder" by making Long's supporters of his own. At the same time, it raised the bitterness of the rich who called Roosevelt "a traitor to his class" and the wealth tax act a "soak the rich tax".

A tax called the undistributed profits tax was enacted in 1936. This time the primary purpose was revenue, since Congress had enacted the Adjusted Compensation Payment Act, calling for payments of $2 billion to World War I veterans. The bill established the persisting principle that retained corporate earnings could be taxed. Paid dividends were tax deductible by corporations. Its proponents intended the bill to replace all other corporation taxes—believing this would stimulate corporations to distribute earnings and thus put more cash and spending power in the hands of individuals. In the end, Congress watered down the bill, setting the tax rates at 7 to 27% and largely exempting small enterprises. Facing widespread and fierce criticism, the tax deduction of paid dividends was repealed in 1938.

=== Housing Act of 1937 ===
The United States Housing Act of 1937 created the United States Housing Authority within the U.S. Department of the Interior. It was one of the last New Deal agencies created. The bill passed in 1937 with some Republican support to abolish slums.

=== National political alignment ===
By 1936, the term "progressive" was typically used for supporters of the New Deal and "conservative" for its opponents. Roosevelt was assisted in his endeavors by the election of a liberal Congress in 1932. According to one source "We recognize that the best liberal legislation in American history was enacted following the election of President Roosevelt and a liberal Congress in 1932. After the midterm congressional election setbacks in 1938, labor was faced with a hostile congress until 1946. Only the presidential veto prevented the enactment of reactionary anti-labor laws." In noting the composition of the Seventy-Third Congress, one study has stated: "Though much of the Democratic congressional leadership remained old-guard, southern, agrarian, and conservative, the rank-and-file Democratic majorities in both houses were largely made up of fresh, northern, urban-industrial representatives of at least potentially liberal bent. At a minimum they were impatient with inaction, and not likely to be silenced by appeals to tradition. They were, as yet, an unformed and reckoned force, one that Roosevelt might mould to his purposes of remaking his party – or one whose very strength and impetuosity might force the president's hand." As stated by another study, in regards to the gains the Democrats made in the 1932 midterm elections, "The party gained ninety seats in the house and thirteen in the Senate. Even more significant, from the standpoint of potential support for urban programs, was that non-Southern Democrats represented a working majority in the House for the first of what would be only a few times in the twentieth century. Roosevelt's political instincts mood paralleled the mood of Congress, and he sought policies to tie the party's new urban supporters into a permanent majority coalition behind the Democratic Party." As noted by another study, "President Roosevelt's extraordinary legislative accomplishments between 1933 and 1938 owed much to his personal political qualities, but ideologically favourable large partisan majorities in the House and the Senate were a prerequisite of success."

As one journal reflected in 1950: "Look back to the 1930's and you can see how winning in mid-terms years affects the kind of laws that are passed. A tremendous liberal majority was swept in with Franklin Roosevelt in 1932. In the 1934 mid-term races that liberal majority was increased. After 1936 it went even higher."

From 1934 to 1938, there existed a "pro-spender" majority in Congress (drawn from two-party, competitive, non-machine, progressive and left party districts). In the 1938 midterm election, Roosevelt and his progressive supporters lost control of Congress to the bipartisan conservative coalition. Many historians distinguish between the First New Deal (1933–1934) and a Second New Deal (1935–1936), with the second one more progressive and more controversial.

=== Big city voting ===
Franklin Delano Roosevelt had a magnetic appeal to the city dwellers—he brought relief and recognition of their ethnic leaders and ward bosses, as well as labor unions. Taxpayers, small business and the middle class voted for Roosevelt in 1936 but turned sharply against him after the recession of 1937-38 seemed to belie his promises of recovery. Roosevelt's New Deal Coalition discovered an entirely new use for city machines in his three reelection campaigns of the New Deal and the Second World War. Traditionally, local bosses minimized turnout so as to guarantee reliable control of their wards and legislative districts. To carry the electoral college, however, Roosevelt needed to carry the entire state, and thus needed massive majorities in the largest cities to overcome the hostility of suburbs and towns.

With Harry Hopkins his majordomo, Roosevelt used the WPA as a national political machine. Men on relief could get WPA jobs regardless of their politics, but hundreds of thousands of well-paid supervisory jobs were given to the local Democratic machines. The 3.5 million voters on relief payrolls during the 1936 election cast 82% of their ballots for Roosevelt. The vibrant labor unions, heavily based in the cities, likewise did their utmost for their benefactor, voting 80% for him, as did Irish, Italian and Jewish voters. In all, the nation's 106 cities over 100,000 population voted 70% for FDR in 1936, compared to his 59% elsewhere. Roosevelt won reelection in 1940 thanks to the cities. In the North, the cities over 100,000 gave Roosevelt 60% of their votes, while the rest of the North favored Willkie 52%-48%. It was just enough to provide the critical electoral college margin. With the start of full-scale war mobilization in the summer of 1940, the cities revived. The new war economy pumped massive investments into new factories and funded round-the-clock munitions production, guaranteeing a job to anyone who showed up at the factory gate.

== Court-packing plan and jurisprudential shift ==
When the Supreme Court started abolishing New Deal programs as unconstitutional, Roosevelt launched a surprise counter-attack in early 1937. He proposed adding five new justices, but conservative Democrats revolted, led by the Vice President. The Judiciary Reorganization Bill of 1937 failed—it never reached a vote. In addition, Senate Majority Leader and New Deal "marshal" Joseph T. Robinson would die on July 14, 1937, thus depriving the Democrat controlled-Senate of an influential "towering leader." Momentum in Congress and public opinion shifted to the right and very little new legislation was passed expanding the New Deal. However, retirements allowed Roosevelt to put supporters on the Court and it stopped killing New Deal programs.

== Recession of 1937 and recovery ==
The Roosevelt administration was under assault during Roosevelt's second term, which presided over a new dip in the Great Depression in the fall of 1937 that continued through most of 1938. Production and profits declined sharply. Unemployment jumped from 14.3% in May 1937 to 19.0% in June 1938. The downturn could have been explained by the familiar rhythms of the business cycle, but until 1937 Roosevelt had claimed responsibility for the excellent economic performance. That backfired in the recession and the heated political atmosphere of 1937.

John Maynard Keynes did not think that the New Deal under Roosevelt single-handedly ended the Great Depression: "It is, it seems, politically impossible for a capitalistic democracy to organize expenditure on the scale necessary to make the grand experiments which would prove my case—except in war conditions."

== World War II and full employment ==
The U.S. reached full employment after entering World War II in December 1941. Under the special circumstances of war mobilization, massive war spending doubled the gross national product (GNP). Military Keynesianism brought full employment and federal contracts were cost-plus. Instead of competitive bidding to get lower prices, the government gave out contracts that promised to pay all the expenses plus a modest profit. Factories hired everyone they could find regardless of their lack of skills—they simplified work tasks and trained the workers, with the federal government paying all the costs. Millions of farmers left marginal operations, students quit school and housewives joined the labor force.

== Legacy ==
New Deal Era
- 1930s–1970s
Great Depression - System of 1896	1964–1980 - Reagan Era
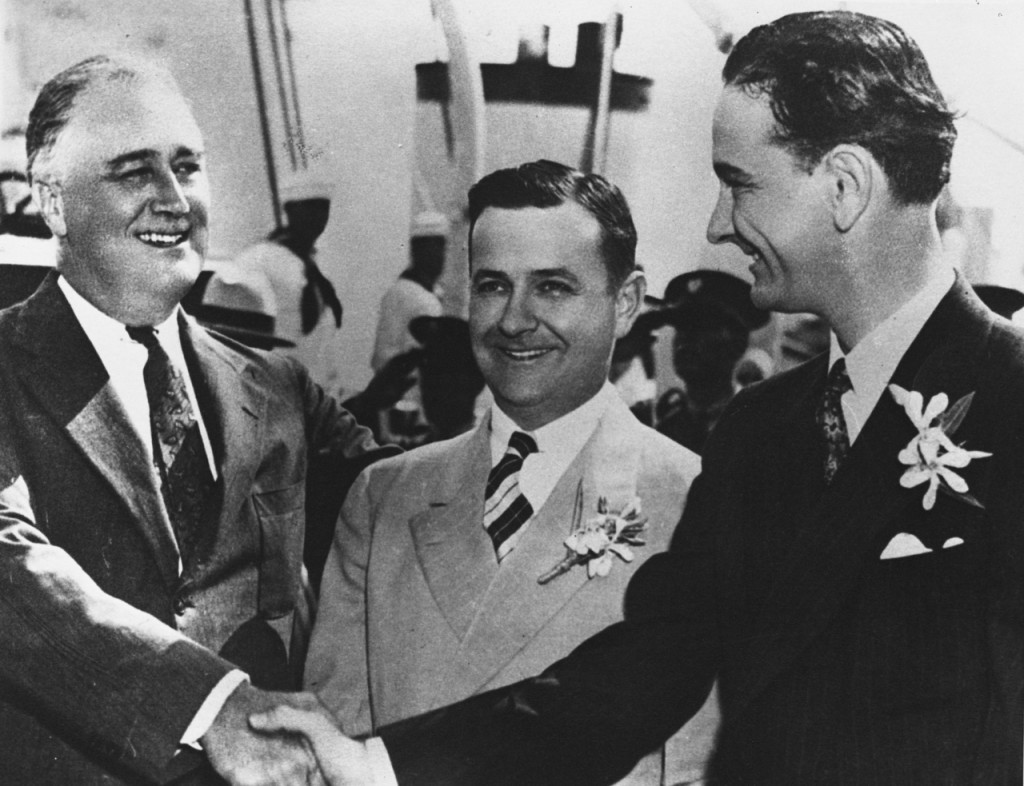
- The New Deal was the inspiration for President Lyndon B. Johnson's Great Society in the 1960s: Johnson (on right) headed the Texas NYA and was elected to Congress in 1938.
- Location: United States
- Including: Fifth Party System; Great Depression; World War II; Cold War; Post-war Era
- President(s): Franklin D. Roosevelt; Harry S. Truman; Dwight D. Eisenhower; John F. Kennedy; Lyndon B. Johnson
- Key events: First New Deal; Second New Deal; Proposed Second Bill of Rights; Fair Deal; New Frontier; War on Poverty; Civil Rights Act of 1964; Great Society; Voting Rights Act of 1965

According to the Encyclopædia Britannica, "perhaps the greatest achievement of the New Deal was to restore faith in American democracy at a time when many people believed that the only choice left was between communism and fascism".

Analysts agree the New Deal produced a new political coalition that sustained the Democratic Party as the majority party in national politics into the 1960s. A 2013 study found, "an average increase in New Deal relief and public works spending resulted in a 5.4 percentage point increase in the 1936 Democratic voting share and a smaller amount in 1940. The estimated persistence of this shift suggests that New Deal spending increased long-term Democratic support by 2 to 2.5 percentage points. Thus, it appears that Roosevelt's early, decisive actions created long-lasting positive benefits for the Democratic party... The New Deal did play an important role in consolidating Democratic gains for at least two decades".

However, there is disagreement about whether it marked a permanent change in values. Cowie and Salvatore in 2008 argued that it was a response to Depression and did not mark a commitment to a welfare state because the U.S. has always been too individualistic. MacLean rejected the idea of a definitive political culture. She says they overemphasized individualism and ignored the enormous power that big capital wields, the Constitutional restraints on radicalism and the role of racism, antifeminism and homophobia. She warns that accepting Cowie and Salvatore's argument that conservatism's ascendancy is inevitable would dismay and discourage activists on the left. Klein responds that the New Deal did not die a natural death—it was killed off in the 1970s by a business coalition mobilized by such groups as the Business Roundtable, the Chamber of Commerce, trade organizations, conservative think tanks and decades of sustained legal and political attacks.

Historians generally agree that during Roosevelt's 12 years in office there was a dramatic increase in the power of the federal government as a whole. Roosevelt also established the presidency as the prominent center of authority within the federal government. Roosevelt created a large array of agencies protecting various groups of citizens—workers, farmers, and others—who suffered from the crisis and thus enabled them to challenge the powers of the corporations. In this way, the Roosevelt administration generated a set of political ideas—known as New Deal Progressivism—that remained a source of inspiration and controversy for decades. New Deal liberalism lay the foundation of a new consensus. Between 1940 and 1980, there was the progressive consensus about the prospects for the widespread distribution of prosperity within an expanding capitalist economy. Especially Harry S. Truman's Fair Deal and in the 1960s Lyndon B. Johnson's Great Society used the New Deal as inspiration for a dramatic expansion of progressive programs.

Recent historical scholarship emphasizes that the New Deal's policy design was shaped not only by Keynesian ideas but also by institutional economics. Scholars like Michael A. Bernstein argue that strict adherence to classical economic theory prolonged the Depression, prompting policymakers to explore alternative frameworks. Institutional economists, including John R. Commons and Thorstein Veblen, emphasized the importance of labor rights, market regulation, and legal structures, helping inspire reforms like the Wagner Act and the creation of the SEC. Economic historian Alexander J. Field notes that New Deal infrastructure investments stimulated long-term productivity growth, aligning with Keynesian demand-management principles even when not explicitly framed as such. Milton Friedman and Anna J. Schwartz, from a monetarist view, critique the Federal Reserve's failure to expand the money supply during the crisis, which they argue deepened the initial collapse into depression.

The New Deal's enduring appeal on voters fostered its acceptance by moderate and progressive Republicans.

As the first Republican president elected after Roosevelt, Dwight D. Eisenhower (1953–1961) built on the New Deal in a manner that embodied his thoughts on efficiency and cost-effectiveness. He sanctioned a major expansion of Social Security by a self-financed program. He supported such New Deal programs as the minimum wage and public housing—he greatly expanded federal aid to education and built the Interstate Highway system primarily as defense programs (rather than jobs program). In a private letter, Eisenhower wrote:

Should any party attempt to abolish social security and eliminate labor laws and farm programs, you would not hear of that party again in our political history. There is a tiny splinter group of course, that believes you can do these things [...] Their number is negligible and they are stupid.

In 1964, Barry Goldwater, an unreconstructed anti–New Dealer, was the Republican presidential candidate on a platform that attacked the New Deal. The Democrats under Lyndon B. Johnson won a massive landslide and Johnson's Great Society programs extended the New Deal. However, the supporters of Goldwater formed the New Right which helped to bring Ronald Reagan into the White House in the 1980 presidential election. Once an ardent supporter of the New Deal, Reagan turned against it, now viewing government as the problem rather than solution and, as president, moved the nation away from the New Deal model of government activism, shifting greater emphasis to the private sector.

A 2016 review study of the existing literature in the Journal of Economic Literature summarized the findings of the research as follows:

The studies find that public works and relief spending had state income multipliers of around one, increased consumption activity, attracted internal migration, reduced crime rates, and lowered several types of mortality. The farm programs typically aided large farm owners but eliminated opportunities for share croppers, tenants, and farm workers. The Home Owners' Loan Corporation's purchases and refinancing of troubled mortgages staved off drops in housing prices and home ownership rates at relatively low ex-post cost to taxpayers. The Reconstruction Finance Corporation's loans to banks and railroads appear to have had little positive impact, although the banks were aided when the RFC took ownership stakes.

== Historiography and evaluation of New Deal policies ==
Historians debating the New Deal have generally been divided between progressives who support it, conservatives who oppose it, and some New Left historians who complain it was too favorable to capitalism and did too little for minorities. There is consensus on only a few points, with most commentators favorable toward the CCC and hostile toward the NRA.

Consensus historians of the 1950s, such as Richard Hofstadter, according to Lary May:

[B]elieved that the prosperity and apparent class harmony of the post-World War II era reflected a return to the true Americanism rooted in liberal capitalism and the pursuit of individual opportunity that had made fundamental conflicts over resources a thing of the past. They argued that the New Deal was a conservative movement that built a welfare state, guided by experts, that saved rather than transformed liberal capitalism.

Progressive historians argue that Roosevelt restored hope and self-respect to tens of millions of desperate people, built labor unions, upgraded the national infrastructure, and saved capitalism in his first term when he could have destroyed it and easily nationalized the banks and the railroads. Historians generally agree that apart from building up labor unions, the New Deal did not substantially alter the distribution of power within American capitalism. "The New Deal brought about limited change in the nation's power structure". The New Deal preserved democracy in the United States in a historic period of uncertainty and crises when in many other countries democracy failed.

The most common arguments can be summarized as follows:

Harmful

- The New Deal vastly increased the federal debt (Billington and Ridge). However, Keynesians argue that the federal deficit between 1933 and 1939 averaged only 3.7% which was not enough to offset the reduction in private sector spending during the Great Depression
- Fostered bureaucracy and administrative inefficiency (Billington and Ridge) and enlarged the powers of the federal government
- Slowed the growth of civil service reform by multiplying offices outside the merit system (Billington and Ridge)
- Infringed upon free business enterprise (Billington and Ridge)
- Prolonged the Great Depression (revisionist economists)
- Rescued capitalism when the opportunity was at hand to nationalize banking, railroads, and other industries (New Left critique)

Neutral

- Stimulated the growth of class consciousness among farmers and workers (Billington and Ridge)
- Raised the issue of how far economic regulation could be extended without sacrificing the liberties of the people (Billington and Ridge)

Beneficial

- Allowed the nation to come through its greatest depression without undermining the capitalist system (Billington and Ridge)
- Made the capitalist system more beneficial by enacting banking and stock market regulations to avoid abuses and providing greater financial security, through, for example, the introduction of Social Security or the Federal Deposit Insurance Corporation (David M. Kennedy)
- Created a better balance among labor, agriculture, and industry (Billington and Ridge)
- Produced a more equal distribution of wealth (Billington and Ridge)
- Help conserve natural resources (Billington and Ridge)
- Permanently established the principle that the national government should take action to rehabilitate and preserve America's human resources (Billington and Ridge)

=== Fiscal policy ===
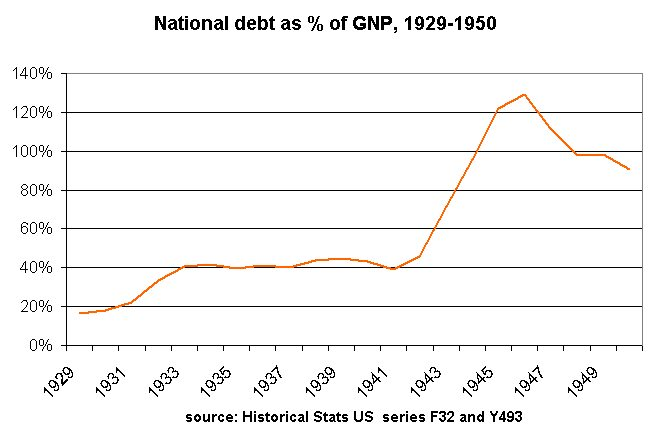
National debt as gross national product climbs from 20% to 40% under President Herbert Hoover; levels off under Roosevelt; and soars during World War II from Historical States US (1976)

Julian Zelizer (2000) has argued that fiscal conservatism was a key component of the New Deal. A fiscally conservative approach was supported by Wall Street and local investors and most of the business community—mainstream academic economists believed in it as apparently did the majority of the public. Conservative southern Democrats, who favored balanced budgets and opposed new taxes, controlled Congress and its major committees. Even progressive Democrats at the time regarded balanced budgets as essential to economic stability in the long run, although they were more willing to accept short-term deficits. As Zelizer notes, public opinion polls consistently showed public opposition to deficits and debt. Throughout his terms, Roosevelt recruited fiscal conservatives to serve in his administration, most notably Lewis Douglas the Director of Budget in 1933–1934; and Henry Morgenthau Jr., Secretary of the Treasury from 1934 to 1945. They defined policy in terms of budgetary cost and tax burdens rather than needs, rights, obligations, or political benefits. Personally, Roosevelt embraced their fiscal conservatism, but politically he realized that fiscal conservatism enjoyed a strong wide base of support among voters, leading Democrats, and businessmen. On the other hand, there was enormous pressure to act and spending money on high visibility work programs with millions of paychecks a week.

Douglas proved too inflexible and he quit in 1934. Morgenthau made it his highest priority to stay close to Roosevelt, no matter what. Douglas's position, like many of the Old Right, was grounded in a basic distrust of politicians and the deeply ingrained fear that government spending always involved a degree of patronage and corruption that offended his Progressive sense of efficiency. The Economy Act of 1933, passed early in the Hundred Days, was Douglas's great achievement. It reduced federal expenditures by $500 million, to be achieved by reducing veterans' payments and federal salaries. Douglas cut government spending through executive orders that cut the military budget by $125 million, $75 million from the Post Office, $12 million from Commerce, $75 million from government salaries and $100 million from staff layoffs. As Freidel concludes: "The economy program was not a minor aberration of the spring of 1933, or a hypocritical concession to delighted conservatives. Rather it was an integral part of Roosevelt's overall New Deal".

Revenues were so low that borrowing was necessary (only the richest 3% paid any income tax between 1926 and 1940). Douglas, therefore, hated the relief programs, which he said reduced business confidence, threatened the government's future credit and had the "destructive psychological effects of making mendicants of self-respecting American citizens". Roosevelt was pulled toward greater spending by Hopkins and Ickes, and as the 1936 election approached he decided to gain votes by attacking big business.

Morgenthau shifted with Roosevelt, but at all times tried to inject fiscal responsibility—he deeply believed in balanced budgets, stable currency, reduction of the national debt, and the need for more private investment. The Wagner Act met Morgenthau's requirement because it strengthened the party's political base and involved no new spending. In contrast to Douglas, Morgenthau accepted Roosevelt's double budget as legitimate—that is a balanced regular budget and an "emergency" budget for agencies, like the WPA, PWA, and CCC, that would be temporary until full recovery was at hand. He fought against the veterans' bonus until Congress finally overrode Roosevelt's veto and gave out $2.2 billion in 1936. His biggest success was the new Social Security program as he managed to reverse the proposals to fund it from general revenue and insisted it be funded by new taxes on employees. It was Morgenthau who insisted on excluding farm workers and domestic servants from Social Security because workers outside industry would not be paying their way.

=== Race and gender ===
==== African Americans ====
While many Americans suffered economically during the Great Depression, African Americans also had to deal with social ills, such as racism, discrimination, and segregation. Black workers were especially vulnerable to the economic downturn since most of them worked the most marginal jobs such as unskilled or service-oriented work, therefore they were the first to be discharged and additionally many employers preferred white workers. In all, African American workers were much more likely to receive public assistance or relief than white workers. Thus in Detroit, blacks made up 4 percent of the population, and accounted for 25 percent of the relief cases. In Chicago, one-half of all black families were on relief.

Roosevelt appointed an unprecedented number of African Americans to second-level leadership positions in his administration—these appointees were collectively called the Black Cabinet. The WPA, NYA, and CCC relief programs allocated 10% of their budgets to blacks (who comprised about 10% of the total population, and 20% of the poor). They operated separate all-black units with the same pay and conditions as white units. Some leading white New Dealers, especially Eleanor Roosevelt, Harold Ickes and Aubrey Williams, worked to ensure blacks received at least 10% of welfare assistance payments. However, these benefits were small in comparison to the economic and political advantages that whites received. Most unions excluded blacks from joining and enforcement of anti-discrimination laws in the South was virtually impossible, especially since most blacks worked in agricultural and hospitality sectors.

The New Deal programs put millions of Americans immediately back to work or at least helped them to survive. The programs were not specifically targeted to alleviate the much higher unemployment rate of blacks. Some aspects of the programs were even unfavorable to blacks. The Agricultural Adjustment Acts, for example, helped land owners who were predominantly white but reduced the need of farmers to hire tenant farmers or sharecroppers which were predominantly black. Though the AAA stipulated that a farmer had to share the payments with those who worked the land, this policy was never enforced. The Farm Service Agency (FSA), a government relief agency for tenant farmers, created in 1937, made efforts to empower African Americans by appointing them to agency committees in the South. Senator James F. Byrnes of South Carolina raised opposition to the appointments because he stood for white land owners who were threatened by an agency that could organize and empower tenant farmers. Initially, the FSA stood behind their appointments, but after feeling national pressure FSA was forced to release the African Americans from their positions. The goals of the FSA were notoriously progressive and not cohesive with the southern voting elite. Some harmful New Deal measures inadvertently discriminated against blacks. Thousands of blacks were thrown out of work and replaced by whites on jobs where they were paid less than the NRA's wage minimums because some white employers considered the NRA's minimum wage "too much money for Negroes". By August 1933, blacks called the NRA the "Negro Removal Act". An NRA study found that the NIRA put 500,000 African Americans out of work.

However, since blacks felt the sting of the depression even more severely than whites, they welcomed any help. In 1936, almost all African Americans (and many whites) shifted from the "Party of Lincoln" to the Democratic Party. This was a sharp realignment from 1932 when most African Americans who could vote chose the Republican ticket. New Deal policies helped establish a political alliance between blacks and the Democratic Party that survives into the 21st century.

There was no attempt whatsoever to end segregation or to increase black civil rights in the South, and a number of leaders that promoted the New Deal were racist.

The wartime Fair Employment Practices Commission (FEPC) executive orders that forbade job discrimination against African Americans, women, and ethnic groups was a major breakthrough that brought better jobs and pay to millions of minority Americans. Historians usually treat FEPC as part of the war effort and not part of the New Deal itself.

==== Segregation ====
The New Deal was racially segregated as blacks and whites rarely worked alongside each other in New Deal programs. The largest relief program by far was the WPA—it operated segregated units, as did its youth affiliate the NYA. Blacks were hired by the WPA as supervisors in the North, but of 10,000 WPA supervisors in the South only 11 were black. Historian Anthony Badger said, "New Deal programs in the South routinely discriminated against blacks and perpetuated segregation." In its first few weeks of operation, CCC camps in the North were integrated. By July 1935, practically all the camps in the United States were segregated, and blacks were strictly limited in the supervisory roles they were assigned. Kinker and Smith argue, "even the most prominent racial liberals in the New Deal did not dare to criticize Jim Crow."

Secretary of the Interior Harold Ickes was one of the Roosevelt Administration's most prominent supporters of blacks and former president of the Chicago chapter of the NAACP. In 1937, when Senator Josiah Bailey Democrat of North Carolina accused him of trying to break down segregation laws Ickes wrote him to deny that:

I think it is up to the states to work out their social problems if possible, and while I have always been interested in seeing that the Negro has a square deal, I have never dissipated my strength against the particular stone wall of segregation. I believe that wall will crumble when the Negro has brought himself to a high educational and economic status.... Moreover, while there are no segregation laws in the North, there is segregation in fact and we might as well recognize this.

The New Deal's record came under attack by New Left historians in the 1960s for its pusillanimity in not attacking capitalism more vigorously, nor helping blacks achieve equality. The critics emphasize the absence of a philosophy of reform to explain the failure of New Dealers to attack fundamental social problems. They demonstrate the New Deal's commitment to save capitalism and its refusal to strip away private property. They detect a remoteness from the people and indifference to participatory democracy and call instead for more emphasis on conflict and exploitation.

==== Women ====
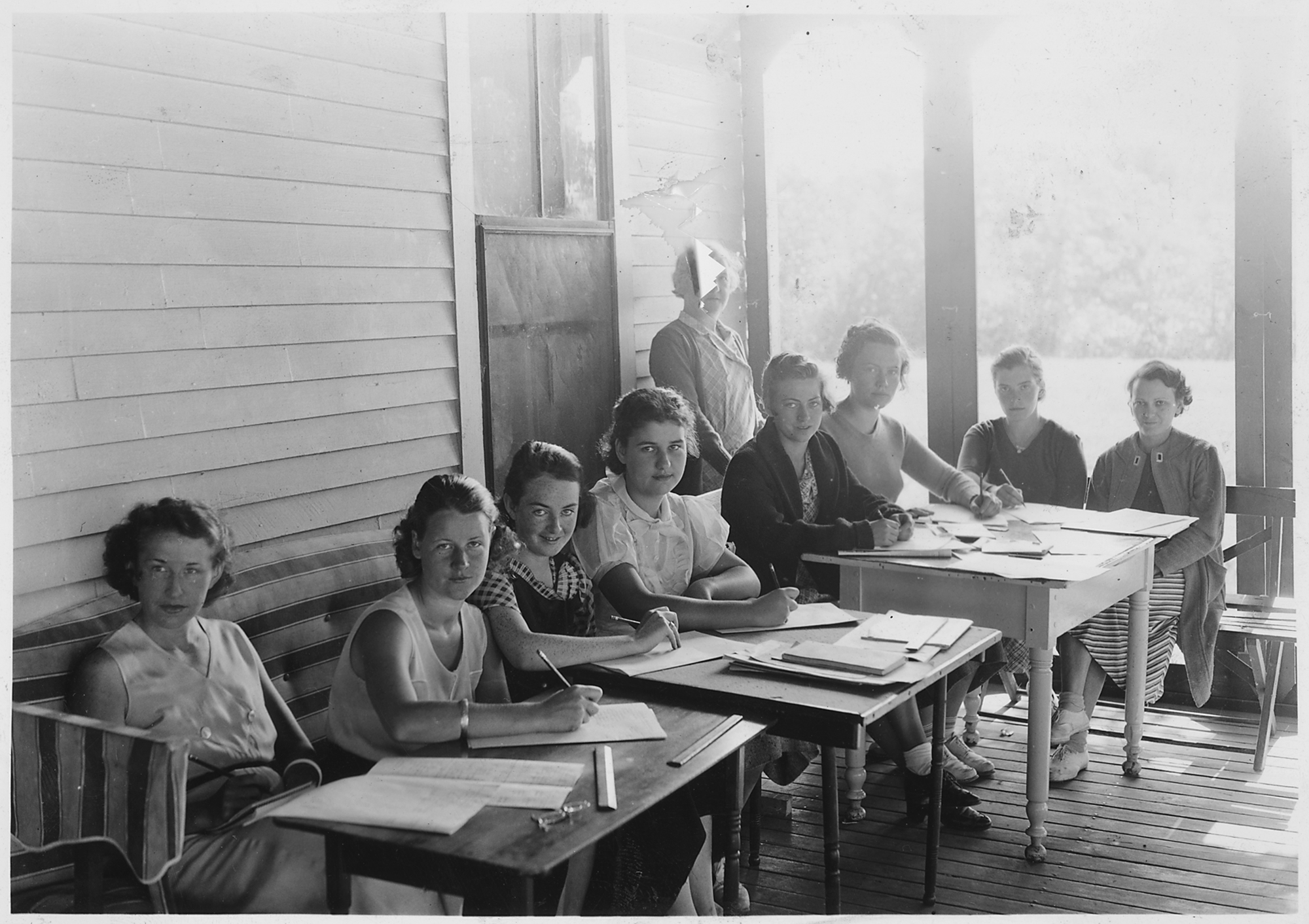
Federal Emergency Relief Administration (FERA) camp for unemployed women in Maine, 1934

At first, the New Deal created programs primarily for men as it was assumed that the husband was the "breadwinner" (the provider) and if they had jobs the whole family would benefit. It was the social norm for women to give up jobs when they married—in many states, there were laws that prevented both husband and wife holding regular jobs with the government. So too in the relief world, it was rare for both husband and wife to have a relief job on FERA or the WPA. This prevailing social norm of the breadwinner failed to take into account the numerous households headed by women, but it soon became clear that the government needed to help women as well.

Many women were employed on FERA projects run by the states with federal funds. The first New Deal program to directly assist women was the Works Progress Administration (WPA), begun in 1935. It hired single women, widows, or women with disabled or absent husbands. The WPA employed about 500,000 women and they were assigned mostly to unskilled jobs. 295,000 worked on sewing projects that made 300 million items of clothing and bedding to be given away to families on relief and to hospitals and orphanages. Women also were hired for the WPA's school lunch program. Both men and women were hired for the small but highly publicized arts programs (such as music, theater, and writing).

=== Relief ===
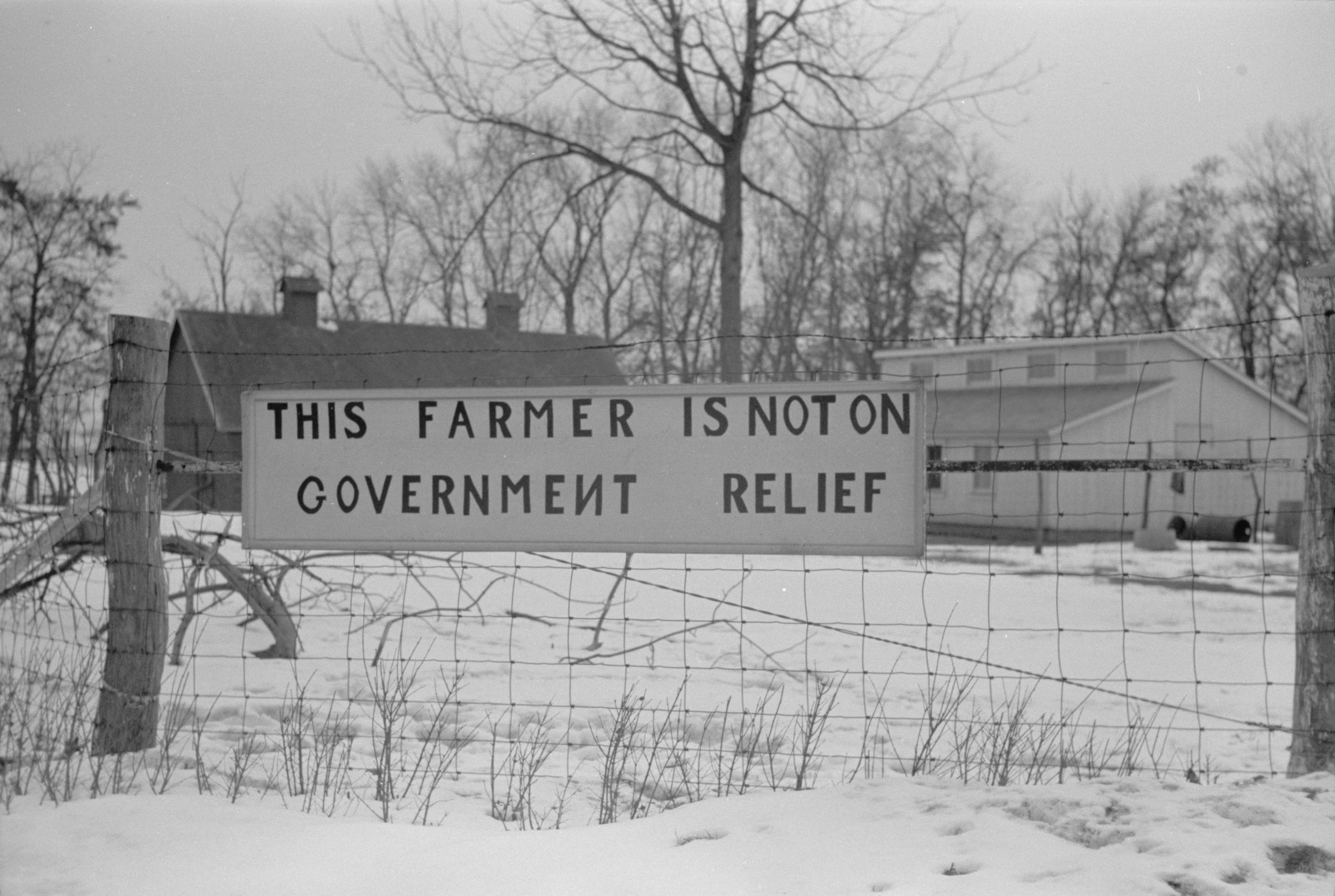
Anti-relief protest sign near Davenport, Iowa by Arthur Rothstein, 1940

The New Deal expanded the role of the federal government, particularly to help the poor, the unemployed, youth, the elderly and stranded rural communities. The Hoover administration started the system of funding state relief programs, whereby the states hired people on relief. With the CCC in 1933 and the WPA in 1935, the federal government now became involved in directly hiring people on relief in granting direct relief or benefits. Total federal, state and local spending on relief rose from 3.9% of GNP in 1929 to 6.4% in 1932 and 9.7% in 1934—the return of prosperity in 1944 lowered the rate to 4.1%. In 1935–1940, welfare spending accounted for 49% of the federal, state and local government budgets. In his memoirs, Milton Friedman said that the New Deal relief programs were an appropriate response. He and his wife were not on relief, but they were employed by the WPA as statisticians. Friedman said that programs like the CCC and WPA were justified as temporary responses to an emergency. Friedman said that Roosevelt deserved considerable credit for relieving immediate distress and restoring confidence.

=== Recovery ===
Roosevelt's New Deal Recovery programs focused on stabilizing the economy by creating long-term employment opportunities, decreasing agricultural supply to drive prices up, and helping homeowners pay mortgages and stay in their homes, which also kept the banks solvent. In a survey of economic historians conducted by Robert Whaples, Professor of Economics at Wake Forest University, anonymous questionnaires were sent to members of the Economic History Association. Members were asked to disagree, agree, or agree with provisos with the statement that read: "Taken as a whole, government policies of the New Deal served to lengthen and deepen the Great Depression". While only 6% of economic historians who worked in the history department of their universities agreed with the statement, 27% of those that work in the economics department agreed. Almost an identical percent of the two groups (21% and 22%) agreed with the statement "with provisos" (a conditional stipulation) while 74% of those who worked in the history department and 51% in the economic department disagreed with the statement outright.

==== Economic growth and unemployment (1933–1941) ====
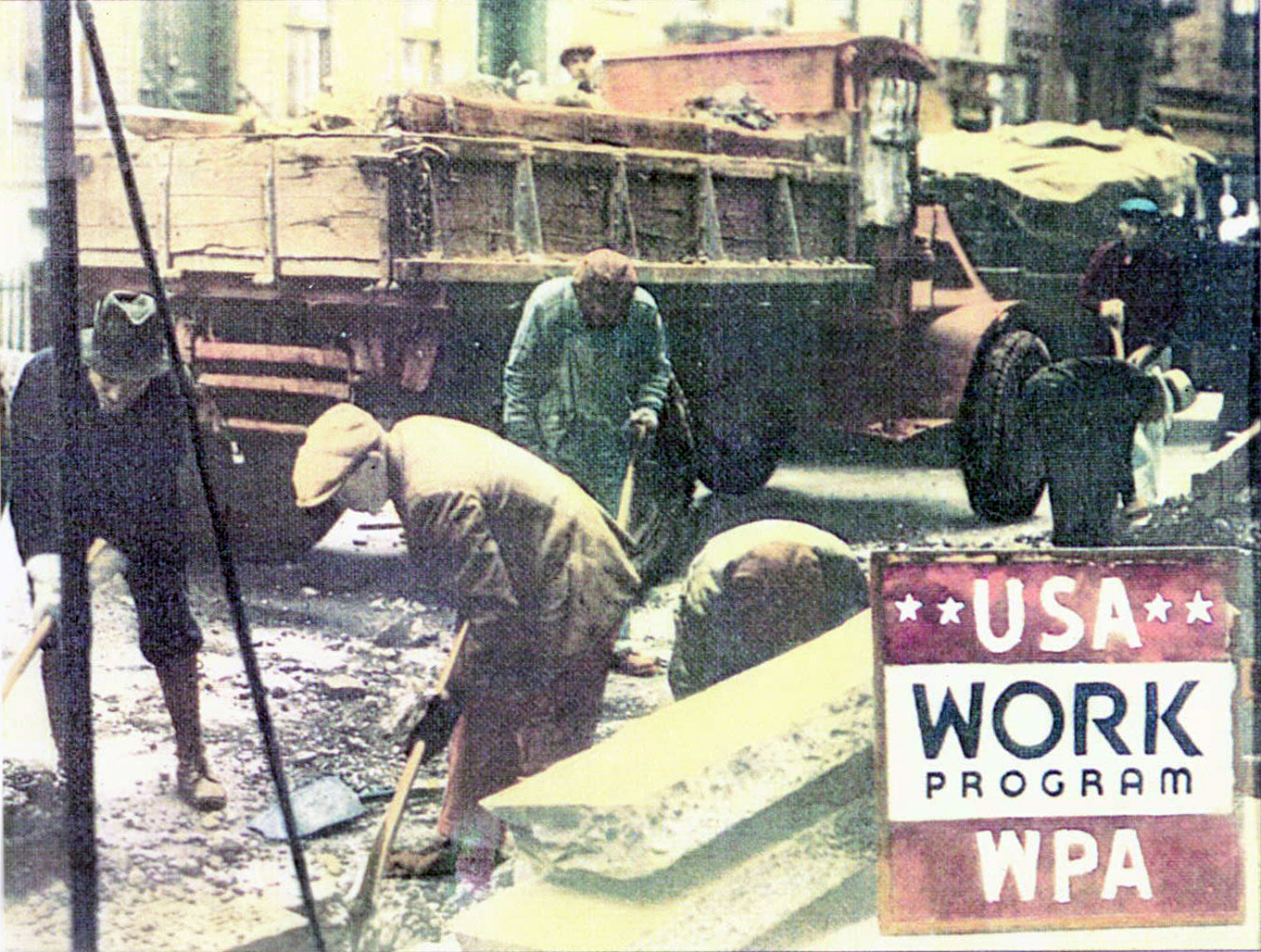
WPA employed 2 to 3 million unemployed at unskilled labor.

From 1933 to 1941, the economy expanded at an average rate of 7.7% per year. Despite high economic growth, unemployment rates fell slowly.

Unemployment rate	1933	1934	1935	1936	1937	1938	1939	1940	1941
Workers in job creation programs counted as unemployed	24.9%	21.7%	20.1%	16.9%	14.3%	19.0%	17.2%	14.6%	9.9%
Workers in job creation programs counted as employed	20.6%	16.0%	14.2%	9.9%	9.1%	12.5%	11.3%	9.5%	8.0%

John Maynard Keynes explained that situation as an underemployment equilibrium where skeptic business prospects prevent companies from hiring new employees. It was seen as a form of cyclical unemployment.

There are different assumptions as well. According to Richard L. Jensen, cyclical unemployment was a grave matter primarily until 1935. Between 1935 and 1941, structural unemployment became the bigger problem. Especially the unions successes in demanding higher wages pushed management into introducing new efficiency-oriented hiring standards. It ended inefficient labor such as child labor, casual unskilled work for subminimum wages and sweatshop conditions. In the long term, the shift to efficiency wages led to high productivity, high wages and a high standard of living, but it necessitated a well-educated, well-trained, hard-working labor force. It was not before war time brought full employment that the supply of unskilled labor (that caused structural unemployment) downsized.

==== Mainstream economics interpretation ====
U.S. GDP annual pattern and long-term trend (1920–1940) in billions of constant dollars

===== Keynesians: halted the collapse but lacked Keynesian deficit spending =====
At the beginning of the Great Depression, many economists traditionally argued against deficit spending. The fear was that government spending would "crowd out" private investment and would thus not have any effect on the economy, a proposition known as the Treasury view, but Keynesian economics rejected that view. They argued that by spending vastly more money—using fiscal policy—the government could provide the needed stimulus through the multiplier effect. Without that stimulus, business simply would not hire more people, especially the low skilled and supposedly "untrainable" men who had been unemployed for years and lost any job skill they once had. Keynes visited the White House in 1934 to urge President Roosevelt to increase deficit spending. Roosevelt afterwards complained, "he left a whole rigmarole of figures—he must be a mathematician rather than a political economist."

The New Deal tried public works, farm subsidies and other devices to reduce unemployment, but Roosevelt never completely gave up trying to balance the budget. Between 1933 and 1941, the average federal budget deficit was 3% per year. Roosevelt did not fully utilize deficit spending. The effects of federal public works spending were largely offset by Herbert Hoover's large tax increase in 1932, whose full effects for the first time were felt in 1933 and it was undercut by spending cuts, especially the Economy Act. According to Keynesians like Paul Krugman, the New Deal therefore was not as successful in the short run as it was in the long run.

Following the Keynesian consensus (that lasted until the 1970s), the traditional view was that federal deficit spending associated with the war brought full-employment output while monetary policy was just aiding the process. In this view, the New Deal did not end the Great Depression, but halted the economic collapse and ameliorated the worst of the crises.

===== Monetarist interpretation =====
====== Milton Friedman ======
More influential among economists has been the monetarist interpretation by Milton Friedman as put forth in A Monetary History of the United States, which includes a full-scale monetary history of what he calls the "Great Contraction". Friedman concentrated on the failures before 1933 and points out that between 1929 and 1932 the Federal Reserve allowed the money supply to fall by a third which is seen as the major cause that turned a normal recession into a Great Depression. Friedman especially criticized the decisions of Hoover and the Federal Reserve not to save banks going bankrupt. Friedman's arguments got an endorsement from a surprising source when Fed Governor Ben Bernanke made this statement:

Let me end my talk by abusing slightly my status as an official representative of the Federal Reserve. I would like to say to Milton and Anna: Regarding the Great Depression, you're right. We did it. We're very sorry. But thanks to you, we won't do it again.

Monetarists state that the banking and monetary reforms were a necessary and sufficient response to the crises. In an interview in 2000, Friedman said:

You have to distinguish between two classes of New Deal policies. One class of New Deal policies was reform: wage and price control, the Blue Eagle, the national industrial recovery movement. I did not support those. The other part of the new deal policy was relief and recovery ... providing relief for the unemployed, providing jobs for the unemployed, and motivating the economy to expand ... an expansive monetary policy. Those parts of the New Deal I did support.

====== Bernanke and Parkinson: cleared the way for a natural recovery ======
Ben Bernanke and Martin Parkinson declared in "Unemployment, Inflation, and Wages in the American Depression" (1989), "the New Deal is better characterized as having cleared the way for a natural recovery (for example, by ending deflation and rehabilitating the financial system) rather than as being the engine of recovery itself."

===== New Keynesian economics: crucial source of recovery =====
Challenging the traditional view, monetarists and New Keynesians like J. Bradford DeLong, Lawrence Summers and Christina Romer argued that recovery was essentially complete prior to 1942 and that monetary policy was the crucial source of pre-1942 recovery. The extraordinary growth in money supply beginning in 1933 lowered real interest rates and stimulated investment spending. According to Bernanke, there was also a debt-deflation effect of the depression which was clearly offset by a reflation through the growth in money supply. However, before 1992 scholars did not realize that the New Deal provided for a huge aggregate demand stimulus through a de facto easing of monetary policy. While Milton Friedman and Anna Schwartz argued in A Monetary History of the United States (1963) that the Federal Reserve System had made no attempt to increase the quantity in high-powered money and thus failed to foster recovery, they somehow did not investigate the impact of the monetary policy of the New Deal. In 1992, Christina Romer explained in "What Ended the Great Depression?" that the rapid growth in money supply beginning in 1933 can be traced back to a large unsterilized gold inflow to the U.S. which was partly due to political instability in Europe, but to a larger degree to the revaluation of gold through the Gold Reserve Act. The Roosevelt administration had chosen not to sterilize the gold inflow precisely because they hoped that the growth of money supply would stimulate the economy.

Replying to DeLong et al. in the Journal of Economic History, J. R. Vernon argues that deficit spending leading up to and during World War II still played a large part in the overall recovery, according to his study "half or more of the recovery occurred during 1941 and 1942".

According to Peter Temin, Barry Wigmore, Gauti B. Eggertsson and Christina Romer, the biggest primary impact of the New Deal on the economy and the key to recovery and to end the Great Depression was brought about by a successful management of public expectations. The thesis is based on the observation that after years of deflation and a very severe recession important economic indicators turned positive just in March 1933 when Roosevelt took office. Consumer prices turned from deflation to mild inflation, industrial production bottomed out in March 1933, investment doubled in 1933 with a turnaround in March 1933. There were no monetary forces to explain that turnaround. Money supply was still falling and short-term interest rates remained close to zero. Before March 1933, people expected a further deflation and recession so that even interest rates at zero did not stimulate investment. However, when Roosevelt announced major regime changes people began to expect inflation and an economic expansion. With those expectations, interest rates at zero began to stimulate investment just as they were expected to do. Roosevelt's fiscal and monetary policy regime change helped to make his policy objectives credible. The expectation of higher future income and higher future inflation stimulated demand and investments. The analysis suggests that the elimination of the policy dogmas of the gold standard, a balanced budget in times of crises and small government led endogenously to a large shift in expectation that accounts for about 70–80 percent of the recovery of output and prices from 1933 to 1937. If the regime change had not happened and the Hoover policy had continued, the economy would have continued its free-fall in 1933 and output would have been 30 percent lower in 1937 than in 1933.

==== Real business-cycle theory: rather harmful ====
Followers of the real business-cycle theory believe that the New Deal caused the depression to persist longer than it would otherwise have. Harold L. Cole and Lee E. Ohanian say Roosevelt's policies prolonged the depression by seven years. According to their study, the "New Deal labor and industrial policies did not lift the economy out of the Depression", but that the "New Deal policies are an important contributing factor to the persistence of the Great Depression". They claim that the New Deal "cartelization policies are a key factor behind the weak recovery". They say that the "abandonment of these policies coincided with the strong economic recovery of the 1940s". The study by Cole and Ohanian is based on a real business-cycle theory model. Laurence Seidman noted that according to the assumptions of Cole and Ohanian, the labor market clears instantaneously, which leads to the incredible conclusion that the surge in unemployment between 1929 and 1932 (before the New Deal) was in their opinion both optimal and solely based on voluntary unemployment. Additionally, Cole and Ohanian's argument does not count workers employed through New Deal programs. Such programs built or renovated 2,500 hospitals, 45,000 schools, 13,000 parks and playgrounds, 7,800 bridges, 700,000 miles (1,100,000 km) of roads, 1,000 airfields and employed 50,000 teachers through programs that rebuilt the country's entire rural school system.

=== Reform ===
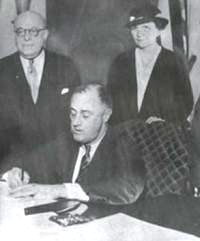
Frances Perkins looks on as Roosevelt signs the National Labor Relations Act.

The economic reforms were mainly intended to rescue the capitalist system by providing a more rational framework in which it could operate. The banking system was made less vulnerable. The regulation of the stock market and the prevention of some corporate abuses relating to the sale of securities and corporate reporting addressed the worst excesses. Roosevelt allowed trade unions to take their place in labor relations and created the triangular partnership between employers, employees and government.

David M. Kennedy wrote, "the achievements of the New Deal years surely played a role in determining the degree and the duration of the postwar prosperity."

Paul Krugman stated that the institutions built by the New Deal remain the bedrock of the United States economic stability. During the 2008 financial crisis, he explained that conditions would have been much worse if the New Deals Federal Deposit Insurance Corporation had not insured most bank deposits and older Americans would have felt much more insecure without Social Security. Economist Milton Friedman after 1960 attacked Social Security from a free market view stating that it had created welfare dependency.

The New Deal banking reform has weakened since the 1980s. The repeal of the Glass-Steagall Act in 1999 allowed the shadow banking system to grow rapidly. Since it was neither regulated nor covered by a financial safety net, the shadow banking system was central to the 2008 financial crisis and the subsequent Great Recession.

=== Impact on federal government and states ===
Though it is essentially consensus among historians and academics that the New Deal brought about a large increase in the power of the federal government, there has been some scholarly debate concerning the results of this federal expansion. Historians like Arthur M. Schlesinger and James T. Patterson have argued that the augmentation of the federal government exacerbated tensions between the federal and state governments. However, contemporaries such as Ira Katznelson have suggested that due to certain conditions on the allocation of federal funds, namely that the individual states get to control them, the federal government managed to avoid any tension with states over their rights. This is a prominent debate concerning the historiography of federalism in the United States and—as Schlesinger and Patterson have observed—the New Deal marked an era when the federal-state power balance shifted further in favor of the federal government, which heightened tensions between the two levels of government in the United States.

Ira Katznelson has argued that although the federal government expanded its power and began providing welfare benefits on a scale previously unknown in the United States, it often allowed individual states to control the allocation of the funds provided for such welfare. This meant that the states controlled who had access to these funds, which in turn meant many Southern states were able to racially segregate—or in some cases, like a number of counties in Georgia, completely exclude African-Americans—the allocation of federal funds. This enabled these states to continue to relatively exercise their rights and also to preserve the institutionalization of the racist order of their societies. Though Katznelson has conceded that the expansion of the federal government had the potential to lead to federal-state tension, he has argued it was avoided as these states managed to retain some control. As Katznelson has observed, "they [state governments in the South] had to manage the strain that potentially might be placed on local practices by investing authority in federal bureaucracies [...]. To guard against this outcome, the key mechanism deployed was a separation of the source of funding from decisions about how to spend the new monies".

However, Schlesinger has disputed Katznelson's claim and has argued that the increase in the power of the federal government was perceived to come at the cost of states' rights, thereby aggravating state governments, which exacerbated federal-state tensions. Schlesinger has utilized quotes from the time to highlight this point and has observed, "the actions of the New Deal, [Ogden L.] Mills said, 'abolish the sovereignty of the States. They make of a government of limited powers one of unlimited authority over the lives of us all.'"

Moreover, Schlesinger has argued that this federal-state tension was not a one-way street and that the federal government became just as aggravated with the state governments as they did with it. State governments were often guilty of inhibiting or delaying federal policies. Whether through intentional methods, like sabotage, or unintentional ones, like simple administrative overload—either way, these problems aggravated the federal government and thus heightened federal-state tensions. Schlesinger has also noted, "students of public administration have never taken sufficient account of the capacity of lower levels of government to sabotage or defy even a masterful President."

James T. Patterson has reiterated this argument, though he observes that this increased tension can be accounted for not just from a political perspective, but from an economic one too. Patterson has argued that the tension between the federal and state governments at least partly also resulted from the economic strain under which the states had been put by the federal government's various policies and agencies. Some states were either simply unable to cope with the federal government's demand and thus refused to work with them, or admonished the economic restraints and actively decided to sabotage federal policies. This was demonstrated, Patterson has noted, with the handling of federal relief money by Ohio governor, Martin L. Davey. The case in Ohio became so detrimental to the federal government that Harry Hopkins, supervisor of the Federal Emergency Relief Administration, had to federalize Ohio relief. Although this argument differs somewhat from Schlesinger's, the source of federal-state tension remained the growth of the federal government. As Patterson has asserted, "though the record of the FERA was remarkably good—almost revolutionary—in these respects it was inevitable, given the financial requirements imposed on deficit-ridden states, that friction would develop between governors and federal officials".

In this dispute, it can be inferred that Katznelson and Schlesinger and Patterson have only disagreed on their inference of the historical evidence. While both parties have agreed that the federal government expanded and even that states had a degree of control over the allocation of federal funds, they have disputed the consequences of these claims. Katznelson has asserted that it created mutual acquiescence between the levels of government, while Schlesinger and Patterson have suggested that it provoked contempt for the state governments on the part of the federal government and vice versa, thus exacerbating their relations. In short, irrespective of the interpretation this era marked an important time in the historiography of federalism and also nevertheless provided some narrative on the legacy of federal-state relations.

== Criticism ==
=== Claims of fascism ===
Worldwide, the Great Depression had the most profound impact in Germany and the United States. In both countries the pressure to reform and the perception of the economic crisis were strikingly similar. When Hitler came to power he was faced with exactly the same task that faced Roosevelt, overcoming mass unemployment and the global Depression. The political responses to the crises were essentially different: while American democracy remained strong, Germany replaced democracy with fascism and a Nazi dictatorship.

The initial perception of the New Deal was mixed. On the one hand, the eyes of the world were upon the United States because many American and European democrats saw in Roosevelt's reform program a positive counterweight to the seductive powers of the two great alternative systems, communism and fascism. As the historian Isaiah Berlin wrote in 1955: "The only light in the darkness was the administration of Mr. Roosevelt and the New Deal in the United States".

By contrast, enemies of the New Deal sometimes called it "fascist", but they meant very different things. Communists denounced the New Deal in 1933 and 1934 as fascist in the sense that it was under the control of big business. They dropped that line of thought when Stalin switched to the "Popular Front" plan of cooperation with progressives.

In 1934, Roosevelt defended himself against those critics in a "fireside chat":

[Some] will try to give you new and strange names for what we are doing. Sometimes they will call it 'Fascism', sometimes 'Communism', sometimes 'Regimentation', sometimes 'Socialism'. But, in so doing, they are trying to make very complex and theoretical something that is really very simple and very practical.... Plausible self-seekers and theoretical die-hards will tell you of the loss of individual liberty. Answer this question out of the facts of your own life. Have you lost any of your rights or liberty or constitutional freedom of action and choice?

After 1945, only few observers continued to see similarities and later on some scholars such as Kiran Klaus Patel, Heinrich August Winkler and John Garraty came to the conclusion that comparisons of the alternative systems do not have to end in an apology for Nazism since comparisons rely on the examination of both similarities and differences. Their preliminary studies on the origins of the fascist dictatorships and the American (reformed) democracy came to the conclusion that besides essential differences "the crises led to a limited degree of convergence" on the level of economic and social policy. The most important cause was the growth of state interventionism since in the face of the catastrophic economic situation both societies no longer counted on the power of the market to heal itself.

John Garraty wrote that the National Recovery Administration (NRA) was based on economic experiments in Nazi Germany and Fascist Italy, without establishing a totalitarian dictatorship. Contrary to that, historians such as Hawley have examined the origins of the NRA in detail, showing the main inspiration came from Senators Hugo Black and Robert F. Wagner and from American business leaders such as the Chamber of Commerce. The model for the NRA was Woodrow Wilson's War Industries Board, in which Johnson had been involved too. Historians argue that direct comparisons between Fascism and New Deal are invalid since there is no distinctive form of fascist economic organization. Gerald Feldman wrote that fascism has not contributed anything to economic thought and had no original vision of a new economic order replacing capitalism. His argument correlates with Mason's that economic factors alone are an insufficient approach to understand fascism and that decisions taken by fascists in power cannot be explained within a logical economic framework. In economic terms, both ideas were within the general tendency of the 1930s to intervene in the free market capitalist economy, at the price of its laissez-faire character, "to protect the capitalist structure endangered by endogenous crises tendencies and processes of impaired self-regulation".

Stanley Payne, a historian of fascism, examined possible fascist influences in the United States by looking at the KKK and its offshoots and movements led by Father Coughlin and Huey Long. He concluded, "the various populist, nativist, and rightist movements in the United States during the 1920s and 1930s fell distinctly short of fascism." According to Kevin Passmore, lecturer in history at Cardiff University, the failure of fascism in the United States was due to the social policies of the New Deal that channelled anti-establishment populism into the left rather than the extreme right.

=== Claims of conservatism, statism and favoritism ===
The New Deal was generally held in very high regard in scholarship and textbooks. That changed in the 1960s when New Left historians began a revisionist critique calling the New Deal a band-aid for a patient that needed radical surgery to reform capitalism, put private property in its place and lift up workers, women and minorities. The New Left believed in participatory democracy and therefore rejected the autocratic machine politics typical of the big city Democratic organizations.

In a 1968 essay, Barton J. Bernstein compiled a chronicle of missed opportunities and inadequate responses to problems. The New Deal may have saved capitalism from itself, Bernstein charged, but it had failed to help—and in many cases actually harmed—those groups most in need of assistance. In The New Deal (1967), Paul K. Conkin similarly chastised the government of the 1930s for its weak policies toward marginal farmers, for its failure to institute sufficiently progressive tax reform, and its excessive generosity toward select business interests. In 1966, Howard Zinn criticized the New Deal for working actively to actually preserve the worst evils of capitalism.

In a 1950s interview for the Columbia University Oral History Project, Paul H. Appleby, who served as assistant to Secretary of Agriculture Henry A. Wallace, described the New Deal's Agricultural Adjustment Act as "militantly for the larger farmers." Dorothy Day believed that by accepting the New Deal, labor was helping in the creation of a servile state instead of ownership of the means of production, and was also critical of the bureaus created by the New Deal.

By the 1970s, progressive historians were responding with a defense of the New Deal based on numerous local and microscopic studies. Praise increasingly focused on Eleanor Roosevelt, seen as a more appropriate crusading reformer than her husband.

In a series of articles, political sociologist Theda Skocpol has emphasized the issue of "state capacity" as an often-crippling constraint. Ambitious reform ideas often failed, she argued, because of the absence of a government bureaucracy with significant strength and expertise to administer them. Other more recent works have stressed the political constraints that the New Deal encountered. Conservative skepticism about the efficacy of government was strong both in Congress and among many citizens. Thus some scholars have stressed that the New Deal was not just a product of its progressive backers, but also a product of the pressures of its conservative opponents.

=== Claims of communism ===
Some hard-right critics in the 1930s claimed that Roosevelt was state socialist or communist, including Charles Coughlin, Elizabeth Dilling, and Gerald L. K. Smith, The accusations generally targeted the New Deal. These conspiracy theories were grouped as the "red web" or "Roosevelt Red Record", based significantly on propaganda books by Dilling. There was significant overlap between these red-baiting accusations against Roosevelt and the isolationist America First Committee. Roosevelt was concerned enough about the accusations that in a September 29, 1936 speech in Syracuse, Roosevelt officially condemned communism. Other accusations of socialism or claimed communism came from Republican representative Robert F. Rich, and senators Simeon D. Fess, and Thomas D. Schall.

The accusations of communism were widespread enough to misdirect from the real Soviet espionage that was occurring, leading the Roosevelt administration to miss the infiltration of various spy rings. Most of the Soviet spy rings actually sought to undermine the Roosevelt administration.

The Communist Party of the United States of America (CPUSA) had been quite hostile to the New Deal until 1935, but acknowledging the danger of fascism worldwide, reversed positions and tried to form a "Popular front" with the New Dealers. The Popular Front saw a small amount of popularity and a relatively restricted level of influence, and declined with the Molotov–Ribbentrop Pact. From 1935, the head of CPUSA Earl Browder sought to avoid directly attacking the New Deal or Roosevelt. With the Soviet invasion of Poland in mid September 1939, Browder was ordered by the Comintern to adjust his position to oppose FDR, which led to disputes within the CPUSA.

==== Communists in government ====
During the New Deal, the communists established a network of a dozen or so members working for the government. They were low level and had a minor influence on policies. Harold Ware led the largest group which worked in the Agriculture Adjustment Administration (AAA) until Secretary of Agriculture Wallace got rid of them all in a famous purge in 1935. Ware died in 1935 and some individuals such as Alger Hiss moved to other government jobs. Other communists worked for the National Labor Relations Board (NLRB), the National Youth Administration, the Works Progress Administration, the Federal Theater Project, the Treasury and the Department of State.

== Works of art and music ==
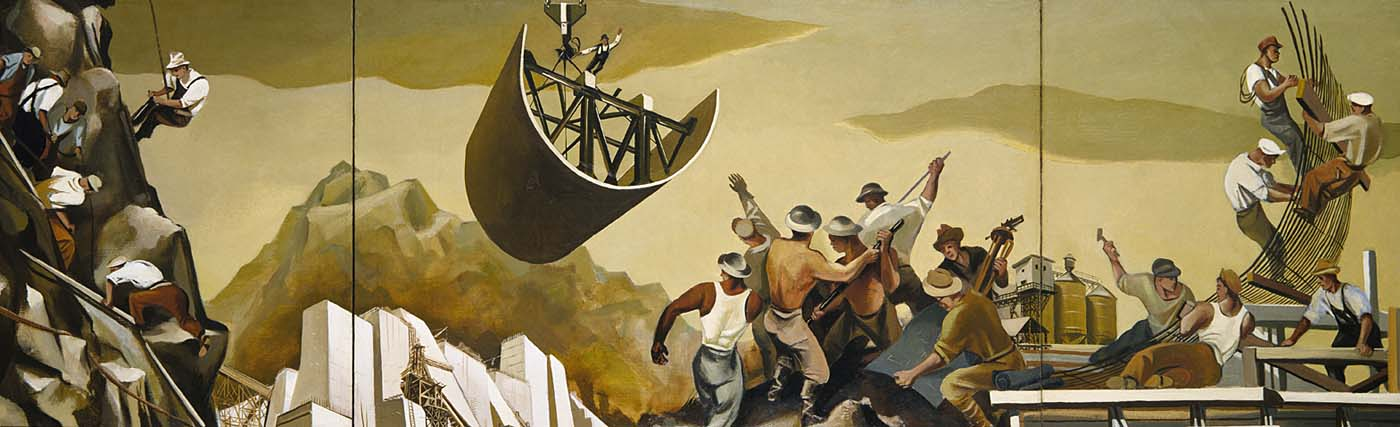
The federal government commissioned a series of public murals from the artists it employed: William Gropper's Construction of a Dam (1939) is characteristic of much of the art of the 1930s, with workers seen in heroic poses, laboring in unison to complete a great public project

The Works Progress Administration subsidized artists, musicians, painters and writers on relief with a group of projects called Federal One. While the WPA program was by far the most widespread, it was preceded by three programs administered by the US Treasury which hired commercial artists at usual commissions to add murals and sculptures to federal buildings. The first of these efforts was the short-lived Public Works of Art Project, organized by Edward Bruce, an American businessman and artist. Bruce also led the Treasury Department's Section of Painting and Sculpture (later renamed the Section of Fine Arts) and the Treasury Relief Art Project (TRAP). The Resettlement Administration (RA) and Farm Security Administration (FSA) had major photography programs. The New Deal arts programs emphasized regionalism, social realism, class conflict, proletarian interpretations and audience participation. The unstoppable collective powers of common man, contrasted to the failure of individualism, was a favorite theme.

"Created Equal": Act I, Scene 3 of Spirit of 1776, Boston (Federal Theatre Project, 1935)

Post Office murals and other public art, painted by artists in this time, can still be found at many locations around the U.S. The New Deal particularly helped American novelists. For journalists and the novelists who wrote non-fiction, the agencies and programs that the New Deal provided, allowed these writers to describe what they really saw around the country.

Many writers chose to write about the New Deal and whether they were for or against it and if it was helping the country out. Some of these writers were Ruth McKenney, Edmund Wilson and Scott Fitzgerald. Another subject that was very popular for novelists was the condition of labor. They ranged from subjects on social protest to strikes.

Under the WPA, the Federal Theatre project flourished. Countless theatre productions around the country were staged. This allowed thousands of actors and directors to be employed, among them were Orson Welles, and John Huston.

The FSA photography project is most responsible for creating the image of the Depression in the U.S. Many of the images appeared in popular magazines. The photographers were under instruction from Washington as to what overall impression the New Deal wanted to give out. Director Roy Stryker's agenda focused on his faith in social engineering, the poor conditions among cotton tenant farmers and the very poor conditions among migrant farm workers—above all he was committed to social reform through New Deal intervention in people's lives. Stryker demanded photographs that "related people to the land and vice versa" because these photographs reinforced the RA's position that poverty could be controlled by "changing land practices". Though Stryker did not dictate to his photographers how they should compose the shots, he did send them lists of desirable themes, such as "church", "court day", "barns".

Films of the late New Deal era such as Citizen Kane (1941) ridiculed so-called "great men" while the heroism of the common man appeared in numerous movies, such as The Grapes of Wrath (1940). Thus in Frank Capra's famous films, including Mr. Smith Goes to Washington (1939), Meet John Doe (1941) and It's a Wonderful Life (1946), the common people come together to battle and overcome villains who are corrupt politicians controlled by very rich, greedy capitalists.

By contrast, there was also a smaller but influential stream of anti–New Deal art. Gutzon Borglum's sculptures on Mount Rushmore emphasized great men in history (his designs had the approval of Calvin Coolidge). Gertrude Stein and Ernest Hemingway disliked the New Deal and celebrated the autonomy of perfected written work as opposed to the New Deal idea of writing as performative labor. The Southern Agrarians celebrated premodern regionalism and opposed the TVA as a modernizing, disruptive force. Cass Gilbert, a conservative who believed architecture should reflect historic traditions and the established social order, designed the new Supreme Court building (1935). Its classical lines and small size contrasted sharply with the gargantuan modernistic federal buildings going up in the Washington Mall that he detested. Hollywood managed to synthesize liberal and conservative streams as in Busby Berkeley's Gold Digger musicals, where the storylines exalt individual autonomy while the spectacular musical numbers show abstract populations of interchangeable dancers securely contained within patterns beyond their control.

== New Deal programs ==
The New Deal had many programs and new agencies, most of which were universally known by their initials. Most were abolished during World War II while others remain in operation or formed into different programs. They included the following:

- National Youth Administration (NYA), 1935: program that focused on providing work for students ages of 16 to 25. Ended in 1943.
- Reconstruction Finance Corporation (RFC): a Hoover agency expanded under Jesse Holman Jones to make large loans to big business. Ended in 1954.

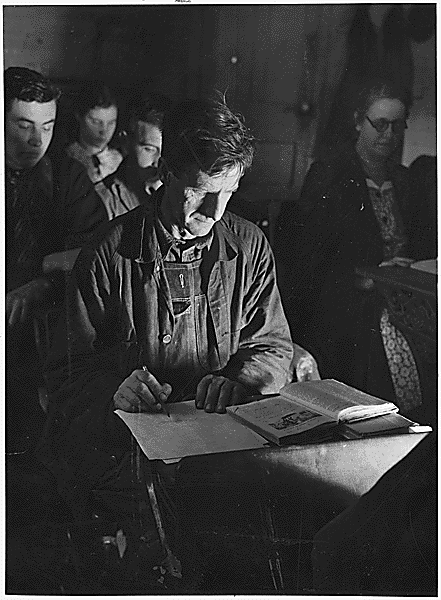
The WPA hired unemployed teachers to provide free adult education programs.

- Federal Emergency Relief Administration (FERA): a Hoover program to create unskilled jobs for relief; expanded by Roosevelt and Harry Hopkins; replaced by WPA in 1935.
- United States bank holiday, 1933: closed all banks until they became certified by federal reviewers.
- Abandonment of gold standard, 1933: gold reserves no longer backed currency; still exists.
- Civilian Conservation Corps (CCC), 1933–1942: employed young men to perform unskilled work in rural areas; under United States Army supervision; separate program for Native Americans.
- Homeowners Loan Corporation (HOLC): helped people keep their homes, the government bought properties from the bank allowing people to pay the government instead of the banks in installments they could afford, keeping people in their homes and banks afloat.
- Tennessee Valley Authority (TVA), 1933: effort to modernize very poor region (most of Tennessee), centered on dams that generated electricity on the Tennessee River; still exists.
- Agricultural Adjustment Act (AAA), 1933: raised farm prices by cutting total farm output of major crops and livestock; replaced by a new AAA because the Supreme Court ruled it unconstitutional.
- National Industrial Recovery Act (NIRA), 1933: industries set up codes to reduce unfair competition, raise wages and prices; ended 1935. The Supreme Court ruled the NIRA unconstitutional.
- Public Works Administration (PWA), 1933: built large public works projects; used private contractors (did not directly hire unemployed). Ended 1938.
- Federal Deposit Insurance Corporation (FDIC): insures bank deposits and supervises state banks; still exists.
- Glass–Steagall Act: regulates investment banking; repealed 1999 (not repealed, only two provisions changed).
- Securities Act of 1933, created the SEC, 1933: codified standards for sale and purchase of stock, required awareness of investments to be accurately disclosed; still exists.
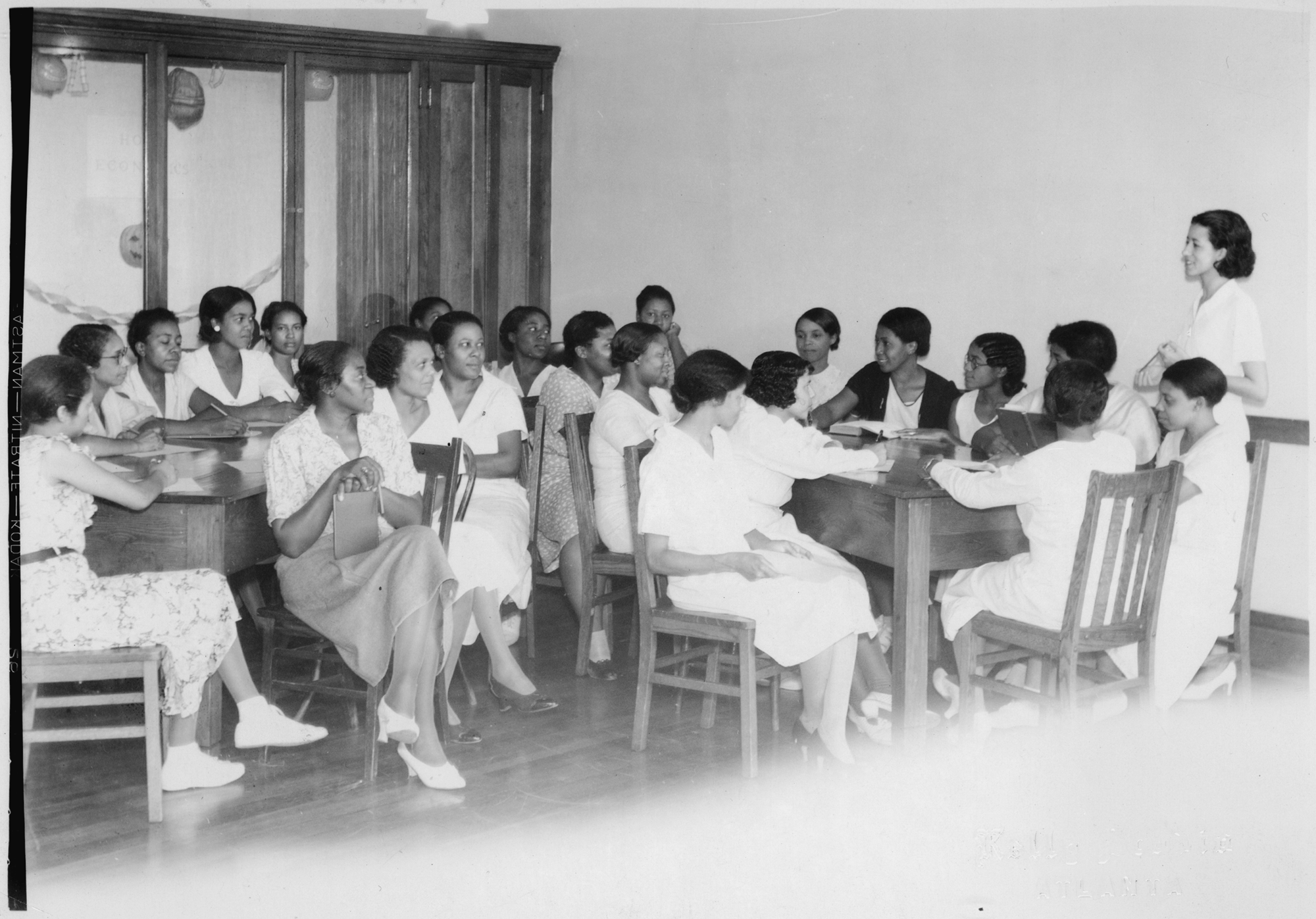
  FERA camp for unemployed black women, Atlanta, 1934
- Civil Works Administration (CWA), 1933–1934: provided temporary jobs to millions of unemployed.
- Indian Reorganization Act, 1934: moved away from assimilation; policy dropped.
- Social Security Act (SSA), 1935: provided financial assistance to: elderly, handicapped, paid for by employee and employer payroll contributions; required 7 years contributions, so first payouts were in 1942; still exists.
- Works Progress Administration (WPA), 1935: a national labor program for more than 2 million unemployed; created useful construction work for unskilled men; also sewing projects for women and arts projects for unemployed artists, musicians and writers; ended 1943.
- National Labor Relations Act (NLRA); Wagner Act, 1935: set up the National Labor Relations Board (NLRB) to supervise labor-management relations. In the 1930s, it strongly favored labor unions. Modified by the Taft–Hartley Act (1947); still exists.
- Judicial Reorganization Bill, 1937: gave the President power to appoint a new Supreme Court judge for every judge 70 years or older; failed to pass Congress.
- Federal Crop Insurance Corporation (FCIC), 1938: insures crops and livestock against loss of production or revenue. Was restructured during the creation of the Risk Management Agency in 1996 but continues to exist.
- Surplus Commodities Program (1936): gives away food to the poor; still exists as the Supplemental Nutrition Assistance Program.
- Fair Labor Standards Act 1938: established a maximum normal work week of 44 hours and a minimum wage of 40 cents/hour and outlawed most forms of child labor, though it still exists. The working hours have been lowered to 40 over the years, and the minimum wage has climbed to $7.25.

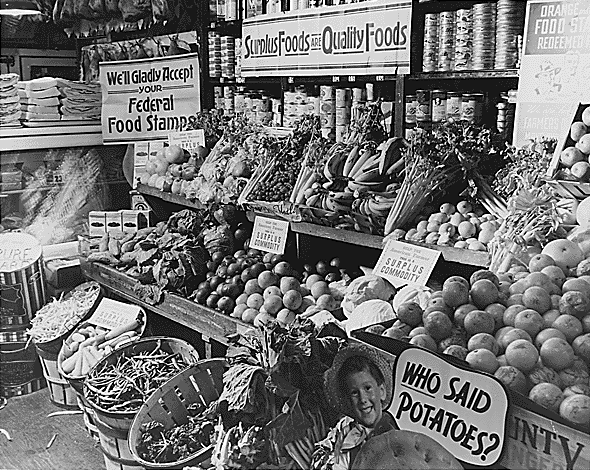
Surplus Commodities Program, 1936

- Rural Electrification Administration (REA): one of the federal executive departments of the United States government charged with providing public utilities (electricity, telephone, water, sewer) to rural areas in the U.S. via public-private partnerships. Still exists.
- Resettlement Administration (RA): resettled poor tenant farmers; replaced by Farm Security Administration in 1935.
- Farm Security Administration (FSA): helped poor farmers by a variety of economic and educational programs; some programs still exist as part of the Farmers Home Administration.

== Statistics ==
=== Depression statistics ===
"Most indexes worsened until the summer of 1932, which may be called the low point of the depression economically and psychologically". Economic indicators show the American economy reached nadir in summer 1932 to February 1933, then began recovering until the recession of 1937–1938. Thus the Federal Reserve Industrial Production Index hit its low of 52.8 on July 1, 1932, and was practically unchanged at 54.3 on March 1, 1933, but by July 1, 1933, it reached 85.5 (with 1935–39 = 100 and for comparison 2005 = 1,342). In Roosevelt's 12 years in office, the economy had an 8.5% compound annual growth of GDP, the highest growth rate in the history of any industrial country, but recovery was slow and by 1939 the gross domestic product (GDP) per adult was still 27% below trend.

Table 1: Statistics
	1929	1931	1933	1937	1938	1940
Real Gross National Product (GNP) (1)	101.4	84.3	68.3	103.9	96.7	113.0
Consumer Price Index (2)	122.5	108.7	92.4	102.7	99.4	100.2
Index of Industrial Production (2)	109	75	69	112	89	126
Money Supply M2 ($ billions)	46.6	42.7	32.2	45.7	49.3	55.2
Exports ($ billions)	5.24	2.42	1.67	3.35	3.18	4.02
Unemployment (% of civilian work force)	3.1	16.1	25.2	13.8	16.5	13.9

- (1) in 1929 dollars
- (2) 1935–1939 = 100

Table 2: Unemployment (% labor force)
Year	Lebergott	Darby
1933	24.9	20.6
1934	21.7	16.0
1935	20.1	14.2
1936	16.9	9.9
1937	14.3	9.1
1938	19.0	12.5
1939	17.2	11.3
1940	14.6	9.5
1941	9.9	8.0
1942	4.7	4.7
1943	1.9	1.9
1944	1.2	1.2
1945	1.9	1.9

- Darby counts WPA workers as employed; Lebergott as unemployed
- Source: Historical Statistics US (1976) series D-86; Smiley 1983

=== Relief statistics ===
Families on relief 1936–1941 Relief cases 1936–1941 (monthly average in 1,000)
	1936	1937	1938	1939	1940	1941
Workers employed:
WPA	1,995	2,227	1,932	2,911	1,971	1,638
CCC and NYA	712	801	643	793	877	919
Other federal work projects	554	663	452	488	468	681
Public assistance cases:
Social security programs	602	1,306	1,852	2,132	2,308	2,517
General relief	2,946	1,484	1,614	1,647	1,570	1,206
Total families helped	5,886	5,660	5,474	6,751	5,860	5,167
Unemployed workers (Bur Lab Stat)	9,030	7,700	10,000	9,480	8,120	5,560
Coverage (cases/unemployed)	65%	74%	53%	71%	72%	13%

== See also ==
- Social policy
- Arthurdale, West Virginia, New Deal planned community
- Progressivism in the United States
- Liberalism in the United States
- Living New Deal, a research project about the impact of the New Deal
- Presidency of Franklin D. Roosevelt, first and second terms
- Presidency of Franklin D. Roosevelt, third and fourth terms
- Social programs in the United States
- Timeline of the Great Depression
- Timeline of the Franklin D. Roosevelt presidency
- Green New Deal
- Fordism
- High modernism
- New Frontier
- Technocentrism
- Technological utopianism
- Techno-progressivism
- Progress

== Sources and further reading ==
=== Surveys ===
- Badger, Anthony J. The New Deal: The Depression Years, 1933–1940. (2002) general survey from British perspective
- Burns, James MacGregor. Roosevelt the Lion and the Fox (1956) online
- Chafe, William H. ed. The Achievement of American Liberalism: The New Deal and its Legacies (2003)
- Collins, Sheila and Gertrude Goldberg, When Government Helped: Learning from the Successes and Failures of the New Deal, (Oxford University Press, 2014), ISBN 978-0-19-999069-6
- Conkin, Paul K. (1967). The New Deal. a brief New Left critique.
- Dubofsky, Melvyn, ed. The New Deal: Conflicting Interpretations and Shifting Perspectives. (1992), older historiography
- Eden, Robert, ed. New Deal and Its Legacy: Critique and Reappraisal (1989), essays by scholars
- Encyclopaedia Britannica, "New Deal. (2020) online Archived June 19, 2015, at the Wayback Machine
- Hiltzik, Michael (2011). The New Deal: A Modern History. Free Press. ISBN 978-1-4391-5448-9.
- Huret, Romain, Nelson Lichtenstein, Jean-Christian Vine, eds. Capitalism Contested: The New Deal and Its Legacies (U of Pennsylvania Press, 2020). excerpt
- Leuchtenburg, William E. (1963). Franklin D. Roosevelt and the New Deal, 1932–1940. A standard interpretive history. online
- Kennedy, David M. (1999). Freedom From Fear: The American People in Depression and War, 1929–1945. Oxford University Press. ISBN 978-0-19-503834-7. survey; Pulitzer Prize online
- Kennedy, David M. (Summer 2009). "What the New Deal Did" (PDF). Political Science Quarterly. 124 (2): 251–268. doi:10.1002/j.1538-165X.2009.tb00648.x. Archived from the original (PDF) on March 4, 2016.
- Kirkendall, Richard S. "The New Deal As Watershed: The Recent Literature", The Journal of American History, (1968) 54#4 pp. 839–852. in JSTOR Archived September 28, 2018, at the Wayback Machine, older historiography
- McElvaine Robert S. The Great Depression 2nd ed (1993), social history; online
- McElvaine Robert S. The Depression and New Deal : a history in documents (2000) online
- McJimsey George T. The Presidency of Franklin Delano Roosevelt (2000) online
- Polenberg, Richard. "The Era of Franklin D. Roosevelt 1933–1945 A Brief History with Documents" ISBN 0-312-13310-3
- Schlesinger, Arthur M. Jr (1957–1960), The Age of Roosevelt, the 3-volume classic narrative history. Strongly supports FDR.
  - Arthur M. Schlesinger Jr. The Age of Roosevelt vol 1: The Crisis Of The Old Order (1919–1933) (1956) online to March 1933
  - Arthur M. Schlesinger Jr. The Age Of Roosevelt vol 2: The Coming of the New Deal (1958) online covers 1933–34
  - Arthur M. Schlesinger Jr. The Age of Roosevelt vol 3: The Age of Upheaval (1960); online
- Sitkoff, Harvard. ed. Fifty Years Later: The New Deal Evaluated. (1984). A friendly liberal evaluation.
- Smith, Jason Scott. A Concise History of the New Deal (2014) excerpt Archived August 6, 2015, at the Wayback Machine
- Whaples, Robert (2008). "New Deal". In Hamowy, Ronald (ed.). Archived copy. The Encyclopedia of Libertarianism. Thousand Oaks, CA: Sage; Cato Institute. pp. 353–355. ISBN 978-1-4129-6580-4. OCLC 750831024. Archived from the original on January 9, 2023.

=== State and local studies ===
- Arrington, Leonard J. "Western Agriculture and the New Deal". Agricultural History 44#4 (1970): 337–353.
- Biles, Roger. The South and the New Deal (2006).
- Biles, Roger. Big City Boss in Depression and War: Mayor Edward J. Kelly of Chicago. (1984); mayor 1933–1947
- Biles, Roger. Memphis: In the Great Depression (U of Tennessee Press, 1986).
- Blakey, George T. Hard Times and New Deal in Kentucky: 1929–1939 (1986).
- Braeman, John, Robert H. Bremner and David Brody, eds. The New Deal: Volume Two – the State and Local Levels (1975); 434 pp; chapters on Massachusetts, Pennsylvania, Ohio, Virginia, Louisiana, Oklahoma, Wyoming, Montana, Colorado, New Mexico, Oregon, Pittsburgh, and Kansas City.
- Christin, Pierre, and Olivier Balez, eds. Robert Moses: The Master Builder of New York City (2014).
- Ferguson, Karen Jane. Black Politics in New Deal Atlanta (2002).
- Grant, Michael Johnston. Down and Out on the Family Farm: Rural Rehabilitation in the Great Plains, 1929–1945 (2002).
- Heineman, Kenneth J. A Catholic New Deal: Religion and Reform in Depression Pittsburgh (2005).
- Ingalls, Robert P. Herbert H. Lehman and New York's Little New Deal (1975).
- Leader, Leonard. Los Angeles and the Great Depression. (1991). 344 pp.
- Lowitt, Richard. The New Deal and the West (1984).
- Malone, Michael P. (1969). "the New Deal in Idaho". Pacific Historical Review. 38 (3): 293–310. doi:10.2307/3636101. JSTOR 3636101.
- Mullins, William H. The Depression and the Urban West Coast, 1929–1933: Los Angeles, San Francisco, Seattle, and Portland. (1991). 176 pp.
- Nicolaides, Becky M. My Blue Heaven: Life and Politics in the Working-Class Suburbs of Los Angeles, 1920–1965. (2002). 412 pp.
- Patterson, James T. The New Deal and the States: Federalism in Transition (Princeton University Press, 1969).
- Starr, Kevin. Endangered Dreams: The Great Depression in California (1997); excerpt and text search Archived March 12, 2021, at the Wayback Machine;
- Stave, Bruce M. The New Deal and the Last Hurrah: Pittsburgh Machine Politics (1970).
- Sternsher, Bernard ed., Hitting Home: The Great Depression in Town and Country (1970), essays by scholars on local history.
- Stock, Catherine McNicol. Main Street in Crisis: The Great Depression and the Old Middle Class on the Northern Plains (1992).
- Strickland, Arvarh E. "The New Deal Comes to Illinois". Journal of the Illinois State Historical Society 63#1 (1970): 55–68. in JSTOR Archived September 28, 2018, at the Wayback Machine
- Thomas, Jerry Bruce. An Appalachian New Deal: West Virginia in the Great Depression (1998).
- Trout, Charles H. Boston, the Great Depression, and the New Deal (1977).
- Tweton, D. Jerome, and Roberta Klugman. The New Deal at the Grass Roots: Programs for the People in Otter Tail County, Minnesota (Minnesota Historical Society Press, 1988).
- Volanto, Keith J. Texas, Cotton, and the New Deal (2005).
- Volanto, Keith. "Where are the New Deal Historians of Texas?: A Literature Review of the New Deal Experience in Texas". East Texas Historical Journal 48+2 (2010): 7+ online Archived March 4, 2016, at the Wayback Machine
- Wickens, James F. "The New Deal in Colorado". Pacific Historical Review 38#3 (1969): 275–291. in JSTOR Archived December 14, 2018, at the Wayback Machine
- Williams, Mason B. City of Ambition: FDR, LaGuardia, and the Making of Modern New York (2013).

=== Biographies ===
External videos
- Presentation by Cohen on Nothing to Fear, January 15, 2009, C-SPAN
- Presentation by Adam Cohen on Nothing to Fear, June 7, 2009, C-SPAN

- Beasley, Maurine H., Holly C. Shulman, Henry R. Beasley. The Eleanor Roosevelt Encyclopedia (2001)
- Brands, H.W. Traitor to His Class: The Privileged Life and Radical Presidency of Franklin Delano Roosevelt (2008)
- Charles, Searle F. Minister of Relief: Harry Hopkins and the Depression (1963)
- Cohen, Adam, Nothing to Fear: FDR's Inner Circle and the Hundred Days that Created Modern America (2009)
- Freidel, Frank (1990). Franklin D. Roosevelt: A Rendezvous with Destiny. Little, Brown. ISBN 0316292605. OCLC 1035148803.
- Graham, Otis L. and Meghan Robinson Wander, eds. Franklin D. Roosevelt: His Life and Times. (1985). An encyclopedic reference. online
- Ingalls, Robert P. Herbert H. Lehman and New York's Little New Deal (1975) online
- McJimsey, George T. Harry Hopkins : ally of the poor and defender of Democracy (1987) online
- Pederson, William D. ed. A Companion to Franklin D. Roosevelt (Blackwell Companions to American History) (2011); 35 essays by scholars; many deal with politics
- Schwarz, Jordan A. Liberal: Adolf A. Berle and the vision of an American era (1987).
- Sternsher, Bernard. Rexford Tugwell and the New Deal (1964) online

=== Economics, farms, labor and relief ===
- Bernstein, Irving. Turbulent Years: A History of the American Worker, 1933–1941 (1970), cover labor unions
- Best, Gary Dean. Pride, Prejudice, and Politics: Roosevelt Versus Recovery, 1933–1938. (1990) ISBN 0-275-93524-8; conservative perspective
- Blumberg, Barbara. The New Deal and the Unemployed: The View from New York City (1977).
- Bremer, William W. "Along the American Way: The New Deal's Work Relief Programs for the Unemployed". Journal of American History 62 (December 1975): 636,52. in JSTOR Archived November 8, 2017, at the Wayback Machine
- Brock, William R. Welfare, Democracy and the New Deal (1988), a British view
- Burns, Helen M. The American Banking Community and New Deal Banking Reforms, 1933–1935 (1974)
- Folsom, Burton. New Deal or Raw Deal?: How FDR's Economic Legacy has Damaged America (2008) ISBN 1-4165-9222-9, conservative interpretation
- Fishback, Price. "The Newest on the New Deal" Essays in Economic & Business History 36#1 (2018) covers distribution and impact of spending and lending programs; online Archived July 17, 2018, at the Wayback Machine
- Fox, Cybelle. Three Worlds of Relief: Race, Immigration, and the American Welfare State from the Progressive Era to the New Deal (2012) excerpt and text search Archived May 4, 2016, at the Wayback Machine
- Friedman, Milton, and Anna Jacobson Schwartz. From New Deal Banking Reform to World War II Inflation (Princeton University Press, 2014) online Archived August 3, 2020, at the Wayback Machine.
- Gordon, Colin. New Deals: Business, Labor, and Politics, 1920–1935 (1994)
- Grant, Michael Johnston. Down and Out on the Family Farm: Rural Rehabilitation in the Great Plains, 1929–1945 (2002)
- Hawley, Ellis W. The New Deal and the Problem of Monopoly (1966)
- Howard, Donald S. The WPA and Federal Relief Policy (1943)
- Huibregtse, Jon R. American Railroad Labor and the Genesis of the New Deal, 1919–1935; (University Press of Florida; 2010; 172 pp.)
- Jensen, Richard J. (1989). "The Causes and Cures of Unemployment in the Great Depression" (PDF). Journal of Interdisciplinary History. 19 (4): 553–583. doi:10.2307/203954. JSTOR 203954. Archived (PDF) from the original on November 2, 2021.
- Leff, Mark H. The Limits of Symbolic Reform: The New Deal and Taxation (1984)
- Lindley, Betty Grimes and Ernest K. Lindley. A New Deal for Youth: The Story of the National Youth Administration (1938)
- Malamud; Deborah C. "'Who They Are – or Were': Middle-Class Welfare in the Early New Deal" University of Pennsylvania Law Review v 151 No. 6 2003. pp. 2019+.
- Meriam; Lewis. Relief and Social Security (1946). Highly detailed analysis and statistical summary of all New Deal relief programs; 912 pages online
- Mitchell, Broadus (1947). Depression Decade: From New Era through New Deal, 1929–1941. survey by economic historian
- Moore, James R. "Sources of New Deal Economic Policy: The International Dimension". Journal of American History 61.3 (1974): 728–744. online Archived August 2, 2020, at the Wayback Machine
- Morris, Charles R. A Rabble of Dead Money: The Great Crash and the Global Depression: 1929–1939 (PublicAffairs, 2017), 389 pp. online review Archived April 24, 2017, at the Wayback Machine
- Myers, Margaret G. Financial History of the United States (1970). pp. 317–342. online
- Parker, Randall E. Reflections on the Great Depression (2002) interviews with 11 leading economists
- Powell, Jim FDR's Folly: How Roosevelt and His New Deal Prolonged the Great Depression (2003) ISBN 0-7615-0165-7
- Rosenof, Theodore. Economics in the Long Run: New Deal Theorists and Their Legacies, 1933–1993 (1997)
- Rosen, Elliot A. Roosevelt, the Great Depression, and the Economics of Recovery (2005) ISBN 0-8139-2368-9
- Rothbard, Murray. America's Great Depression (1963), a libertarian approach
- Saloutos, Theodore. The American Farmer and the New Deal (1982).
- Schwartz, Bonnie Fox. The Civil works administration, 1933–1934: the business of emergency employment in the New Deal (Princeton University Press, 2014)
- Singleton, Jeff. The American Dole: Unemployment Relief and the Welfare State in the Great Depression (2000)
- Skocpol, Theda; Finegold, Kenneth (1982). "State Capacity and Economic Intervention in the Early New Deal" (PDF). Political Science Quarterly. 97 (2): 255–278. doi:10.2307/2149478. JSTOR 2149478. S2CID 155685115. Archived from the original (PDF) on June 15, 2020.
- Skocpol, Theda; Finegold, Kenneth (1977). "Explaining New Deal Labor Policy". American Political Science Review. 84 (4): 1297–1304. doi:10.2307/1963265. JSTOR 1963265. S2CID 154762341.
- Smith, Jason Scott. Building new deal liberalism: The political economy of public works, 1933–1956 (Cambridge University Press, 2006).
- Zelizer, Julian E. (2000). "The Forgotten Legacy of the New Deal: Fiscal Conservatism and the Roosevelt Administration, 1933–1938". Presidential Studies Quarterly. 30 (2): 331–. doi:10.1111/j.0360-4918.2000.00115.x. Archived from the original on October 18, 2007 – via Questia.

=== Race and gender ===
- Abelson, Elaine S. " 'Women who have no men to work for them': gender and homelessness in the Great Depression, 1930-1934" Feminist Studies 29.1 (2003): 105-127. JSTOR 3178478
- Abrams, Douglas Carl. "Irony of reform: North Carolina Blacks and the New Deal." North Carolina Historical Review 66.2 (1989): 149-178. JSTOR 23520672
- Greenberg, Cheryl Lynn. To Ask for an Equal Chance: African Americans in the Great Depression (2009) online
- Hapke, Laura. Daughters of the Great Depression: Women, Work, and Fiction in the American 1930s (1997) online
- Haytock, Jennifer. The Middle Class in the Great Depression: Popular Women’s Novels of the 1930s (Springer, 2013) online.
- Lancaster, Ashley Craig. The Angelic Mother and the Predatory Seductress: Poor White Women in Southern Literature of the Great Depression (LSU Press, 2012) online.
- Milkman, Ruth. "Women's work and economic crisis: some lessons of the Great Depression." Review of Radical Political Economics 8.1 (1976): 71-97.
- Moreno, Paul. "An ambivalent legacy: Black Americans and the Political Economy of the New Deal." The Independent Review 6.4 (2002): 513-539. JSTOR 24562541
- Nordin, Dennis Sven. The New Deal's Black Congressman: A Life of Arthur Wergs Mitchell (U of Missouri Press, 1997). online
- Parker, Robert Dale. "How to Make a Queer: The Erotics of Begging; or, Down and Out in the Great Depression." American Literature 91.1 (2019): 91-119.
- Sharot, Stephen. "Wealth and/or love: Class and gender in the cross-class romance films of the great depression." Journal of American Studies 47.1 (2013): 89-108.
- Sitkoff, Harvard. A New Deal for Blacks: The Emergence of Civil Rights as a National Issue: The Depression Decade (2008) online
- Sullivan, Patricia. Days of hope: Race and democracy in the New Deal era (U of North Carolina Press, 2014). online
- Sundstrom, William A. "Last hired, first fired? Unemployment and Urban Black Workers during the Great Depression." Journal of Economic History 52.2 (1992): 415-429.
- Teague, Greyson. "Oscar DePriest and Black Agency in American Politics, 1928–1934." Journal of Policy History 36.1 (2024): 134-160.
- Ulama, Darryle. "Black Public Works: The Political Economy of Race and New Deal Infrastructure" (PhD dissertation, Massachusetts Institute of Technology, 2021) online
- Ward, Sarah. "Women and Work: African American Women in Depression Era America." (PhD dissertation, CUNY, 2018). online

=== Cultural history ===
- Best, Gary Dean (1993). The Nickel and Dime Decade: American Popular Culture during the 1930s. Archived from the original on October 24, 2017 – via Questia.
- Cooney, Terry A. Balancing Acts: American Thought and Culture in the 1930s (Twayne, 1995)
- Dass, Permeil. "Deciphering Franklin D. Roosevelt's educational policies during the Great Depression (1933-1940)" (PhD dissertation, Georgia State University, 2013) onlinw.
- Dickstein, Morris. Dancing in the Dark: A Cultural History of the Great Depression (2009)
- Eldridge, David Nicholas (2008). American Culture in the 1930s. Edinburgh University Press. Archived from the original on October 24, 2017 – via Questia.
- Kelly, Andrew. Kentucky by Design: The Decorative Arts, American Culture, and the Federal Art Project's Index of American Design (University Press of Kentucky, 2015)
- McKinzie, Richard. The New Deal for Artists (1984), well illustrated scholarly study
- Mathews, Jane De Hart (1975). "Arts and the People: The New Deal Quest for a Cultural Democracy". Journal of American History. 62 (2): 316–339. doi:10.2307/1903257. JSTOR 1903257.
- Osnos, Evan, argues that from the 1930s to 1970s, economic equality narrowed, except among Black Americans.
- Pells, Richard. Radical Visions and American Dreams: Culture and Social Thought in the Depression Years (1973).
- Roddick, Nick. A New Deal in Entertainment: Warner Brothers in the 1930s (London, BFI, 1983).
- Shlaes, Amity. The Forgotten Man: A New History of the Great Depression (2007), a conservative approach
- Shindler, Colin. Hollywood in Crisis: Cinema and American Society, 1929–1939 (Routledge, 1996).
- Stott, William. Documentary Expression and Thirties America (University of Chicago Press, 1973).
- Wecter, Dixon. The Age of the Great Depression, 1929–1941 (1948), social history

=== Politics ===
- Alswang, John. The New Deal and American Politics (1978), voting analysis
- Alter, Jonathan. The Defining Moment: FDR's Hundred Days and the Triumph of Hope (2006), popular account
- Badger, Anthony J. FDR: The First Hundred Days (2008)
- Badger, Anthony J. New Deal / New South: An Anthony J. Badger Reader (2007)
- Bernstein, Barton J. "The New Deal: The Conservative Achievements of Liberal Reform". In Barton J. Bernstein, ed., Towards a New Past: Dissenting Essays in American History, pp. 263–288. (1968), an influential New Left attack on the New Deal.
- Best, Gary Dean. The Critical Press and the New Deal: The Press Versus Presidential Power, 1933–1938 (1993) ISBN 0-275-94350-X
- Best, Gary Dean. Retreat from Liberalism: Collectivists versus Progressives in the New Deal Years (2002) ISBN 0-275-94656-8
- Brinkley, Alan. The End of Reform: New Deal Liberalism in Recession and War. (1995) what happened after 1937
- Cobb, James and Michael Namaroto, eds. The New Deal and the South (1984).
- Conklin, Paul K. "The Myth of New Deal Radicalism" in Myth America: A Historical Anthology, Volume II. 1997. Gerster, Patrick, and Cords, Nicholas. (editors.) Brandywine Press, ISBN 1-881089-97-5
- Domhoff, G. William, and Michael J. Webber. Class and Power in the New Deal: Corporate Moderates, Southern Democrats, and the Liberal-Labor Coalition (Stanford University Press; 2011) 304 pp. uses class dominance theory to examine the Agricultural Adjustment Act, the National Labor Relations Act, and the Social Security Act.
- Ekirch Jr., Arthur A. Ideologies and Utopias: The Impact of the New Deal on American Thought (1971)
- Fraser, Steve and Gary Gerstle, eds., The Rise and Fall of the New Deal Order, (1989), essays focused on the long-term results.
- Garraty, John A. (1973). "The New Deal, National Socialism, and the Great Depression". American Historical Review. 78 (4): 907–944. doi:10.2307/1858346. JSTOR 1858346.
- Higgs, Robert. Crisis and Leviathan: Critical Episodes in the Growth of American Government (1987), Austrian school critique
- Katznelson, Ira. (2013). Fear Itself: The New Deal and the Origins of Our Time. Liveright.
- Ladd, Everett Carll and Charles D. Hadley. Transformations of the American Party System: Political Coalitions from the New Deal to the 1970s (1975), voting behavior
- Lowitt, Richard. The New Deal and the West (1984).
- Maney, Patrick J. "The Rise and Fall of the New Deal Congress, 1933-1945." OAH Magazine of History 12.4 (1998): 13–19. online
- Manza, Jeff (2000). "Political Sociological Models of the U.S. New Deal". Annual Review of Sociology. 26: 297–322. doi:10.1146/annurev.soc.26.1.297.
- Milkis, Sidney M. and Jerome M. Mileur, eds. The New Deal and the Triumph of Liberalism (2002)
- Phillips-Fein, Kim. Invisible Hands: The Businessmen's Crusade Against the New Deal (2009) excerpt Archived May 6, 2022, at the Wayback Machine; same book also published as Invisible hands: the making of the conservative movement from the New Deal to Reagan
- Rauchway, Eric (July 2019). "The New Deal Was on the Ballot in 1932". Modern American History. 2 (02): 201–213. doi:10.1017/mah.2018.42.* Rosen, Eliot A. The Republican Party in the Age of Roosevelt: Sources of Anti-Government Conservatism in the United States (2014)
- Sitkoff, Harvard. A New Deal for Blacks: The Emergence of Civil Rights as a National Issue: The Depression Decade (2008)
- Smith, Jason Scott. Building New Deal Liberalism: The Political Economy of Public Works, 1933–1956 (2005).
- Szalay, Michael (2000). New Deal Modernism: American Literature and the Invention of the Welfare State.
- Tindall, George B. The Emergence of the New South, 1915–1945 (1967). survey of entire South
- Trout, Charles H. Boston, the Great Depression, and the New Deal (1977)
- Venn, Fiona (1998). The New Deal. Edinburgh: Edinburgh University Press. ISBN 978-1-57958-145-9.
- Ware, Susan. Beyond Suffrage: Women and the New Deal (1981)
- Williams, Gloria-Yvonne. (2014). "African-Americans and the Politics of Race During the New Deal". In The New Deal and the Great Depression (pp. 131–344). Kent, OH:Kent State University Press. on academia.edu author's page Archived August 16, 2021, at the Wayback Machine
- Williams, Mason B. City of Ambition: FDR, La Guardia, and the Making of Modern New York (2013)

=== Primary sources ===
- Bureau of the Census, Statistical Abstract of the United States: 1951 (1951) full of useful data; online Archived January 23, 2016, at the Wayback Machine
- Bureau of the Census, Historical Statistics of the United States: Colonial Times to 1970 (1976) part 1 online Archived January 20, 2013, at the Wayback Machine; part 2 online Archived January 20, 2013, at the Wayback Machine
- Cantril, Hadley and Mildred Strunk, eds. Public Opinion, 1935–1946 (1951), massive compilation of many public opinion polls online
- Carter, Susan B. et al. eds. The Historical Statistics of the United States (6 vol: Cambridge University Press, 2006); huge compilation of statistical data; online at some universities
- Gallup, George Horace, ed. The Gallup Poll; Public Opinion, 1935–1971 3 vol (1972) summarizes results of each poll.
- Lowitt, Richard and Maurice Beardsley, eds. One Third of a Nation: Lorena Hickock Reports on the Great Depression (1981)
- Moley, Raymond. After Seven Years (1939), conservative memoir by ex-Brain Truster
- Nixon, Edgar B. ed. Franklin D. Roosevelt and Foreign Affairs (3 vol 1969), covers 1933–37. 2nd series 1937–39 available on microfiche and in a 14 vol print edition at some academic libraries.
- Rasmussen, Wayne D. ed Agriculture in the United States: a documentary history: vol 3: 1914–1940(Random House, 1975).
- Roosevelt, Franklin D.; Rosenman, Samuel Irving, ed. The Public Papers and Addresses of Franklin D. Roosevelt (13 vol, 1938, 1945); public material only (no letters); covers 1928–1945.
- Zinn, Howard, ed. New Deal Thought (1966), a compilation of primary sources.
