= History of alcoholic beverages =

Purposeful production of alcoholic beverages is common and often reflects cultural and religious peculiarities as much as geographical and sociological conditions.

Discovery of late Stone Age jugs suggest that intentionally fermented beverages existed at least as early as the Neolithic period (c. 10,000 BC).

== Archaeological record ==
The ability to metabolize alcohol likely predates humanity with primates eating fermenting fruit.

The oldest verifiable brewery has been found in a prehistoric burial site in a cave near Haifa in modern-day Israel. Researchers have found residue of 13,000-year-old beer that they think might have been used for ritual feasts to honor the dead. The traces of a wheat-and-barley-based alcohol were found in stone mortars carved into the cave floor. Some have proposed that alcoholic drinks predated agriculture and it was the desire for alcoholic drinks that led to agriculture and civilization.

As early as 7000 BC, chemical analysis of jars from the Neolithic village Jiahu in the Henan province of northern China revealed traces of a mixed fermented beverage. According to a study published in the Proceedings of the National Academy of Sciences in December 2004, chemical analysis of the residue confirmed that a fermented drink made of grapes, hawthorn berries, honey, and rice was being produced in 7000–6650 BC. This is approximately the time when barley beer and grape wine were beginning to be made in the Middle East.

Evidence of alcoholic beverages has also been found dating from 5400 to 5000 BC in Hajji Firuz Tepe in Iran, 3150 BC in ancient Egypt, 3000 BC in Babylon, 2000 BC in pre-Hispanic Mexico and 1500 BC in Sudan. According to Guinness, the earliest firm evidence of wine production dates back to 6000 BC in Georgia.

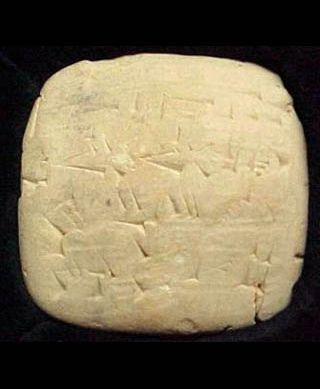
Sumerian tablet from 2050 BC, a dated and signed receipt written by a scribe called Ur-Amma for the delivery of beer, by a brewer named Alulu. The text translates as "Ur-Amma acknowledges receiving from his brewer, Alulu, 5 sila (about 4 1/2 liters) of the 'best' beer."

The medicinal use of alcohol was mentioned in Sumerian and Egyptian texts dating from about 2100 BC. The Hebrew Bible recommends giving alcoholic drinks to those who are dying or depressed, so that they can forget their misery (Proverbs 31:6–7).

In 55 BC, the Romans took notice of an alcoholic cider being made in Britain using native apples. It quickly became popular and was imported back to the continent where it spread rapidly. People in Northern Spain were making cider around the same time period. Celtic people were known to have been making types of alcoholic cider as early as 3000 BC.

Wine was consumed in Classical Greece at breakfast or at symposia, and in the 1st century BC it was part of the diet of most Roman citizens. Both the Greeks and the Romans generally drank diluted wine (the strength varying from 1 part wine and 1 part water, to 1 part wine and 4 parts water).

In Europe during the Middle Ages, beer, often of very low strength, was an everyday drink for all classes and ages of people. A document from that time mentions nuns having an allowance of six pints of ale each day. Cider and pomace wine were also widely available; grape wine was the prerogative of the higher classes.

By the time the Europeans reached the Americas in the 15th century, several native civilizations had developed alcoholic beverages. According to a post-conquest Aztec document, consumption of the local "wine" (pulque) was generally restricted to religious ceremonies but was freely allowed to those who were older than 70 years. The natives of South America produced a beer-like beverage from cassava or maize, which had to be chewed before fermentation in order to turn the starch into sugar (beverages of this kind are known today as cauim or chicha). This chewing technique was also used in ancient Japan to make sake from rice and other starchy crops.

== Ancient period ==
=== Ancient China ===
The earliest evidence of wine was found in what is now China, where jars from Jiahu which date to about 7000 BC were discovered. This early rice wine was produced by fermenting rice, honey, and fruit. What later developed into Chinese civilization grew up along the more northerly Yellow River and fermented a kind of huangjiu from millet. The Zhou attached great importance to alcohol and ascribed the loss of the mandate of Heaven by the earlier Xia and Shang as largely due to their dissolute and alcoholic emperors. An edict ascribed to c. 1116 BC makes it clear that the use of alcohol in moderation was believed to be prescribed by heaven.

Unlike the traditions in Europe and the Middle East, China abandoned the production of grape wine before the advent of writing and, under the Han, abandoned beer in favor of huangjiu and other forms of rice wine. These naturally fermented to a strength of about 20% ABV; they were usually consumed warmed and frequently flavored with additives as part of traditional Chinese medicine. They considered it spiritual food and extensive documentary evidence attests to the important role it played in religious life. "In ancient times people always drank when holding a memorial ceremony, offering sacrifices to gods or their ancestors, pledging resolution before going into battle, celebrating victory, before feuding and official executions, for taking an oath of allegiance, while attending the ceremonies of birth, marriage, reunions, departures, death, and festival banquets." Marco Polo's 14th century record indicates grain and rice wine were drunk daily and were one of the treasury's biggest sources of income.

Alcoholic beverages were widely used in all segments of Chinese society, were used as a source of inspiration, were important for hospitality, were considered an antidote for fatigue, and were sometimes misused. Laws against making wine were enacted and repealed forty-one times between 1100 BC and AD 1400. However, a commentator writing around 650 BC asserted that people "will not do without beer. To prohibit it and secure total abstinence from it is beyond the power even of sages. Hence, therefore, we have warnings on the abuse of it."

The Chinese may have independently developed the process of distillation in the early centuries of the Common Era, during the Eastern Han dynasty.

=== Ancient Persia (or Ancient Iran) ===
A major step forward in our understanding of Neolithic winemaking came from the analysis of a yellowish residue excavated by Mary M. Voigt at the site of Hajji Firuz Tepe in the northern Zagros Mountains of Iran. The jar that once contained wine, with a volume of about 9 liters (2.5 gallons) was found together with five similar jars embedded in the earthen floor along one wall of a "kitchen" of a Neolithic mudbrick building, dated to c. 5400–5000 BC. In such communities, winemaking was the best technology they had for storing highly perishable grapes, although whether the resulting beverage was intended for intoxication as well as nourishment is not known.

=== Ancient Sumer ===
Archaeological finds as well as ancient documentation serve as testimony to the popularity and abundance of alcohol in the Sumerian society. Access to alcohol was regulated, the social elite indulged in it and it served as sacrificial offerings to the gods. In Sumerian culture alcohol was also a means for happiness. In the epic of Gilgamesh, Enkidu the wild man drinks seven jugs of beer, becomes elated and sings with joy. Other characters routinely drink water, but drink alcohol when celebrating. During the new year celebrations, the ceremonial reenactment of the drunken union between the king of Uruk and the high priestess of Ishtar, the goddess of procreation, symbolized the genesis of Ninkasi, the beer goddess. A hymn to Ninkasi gives a detailed description of mash production in Sumer, involving the fermentation of bread and the addition of grapes and honey, resulting in an unfiltered brew drunk through straws.

=== Ancient Egypt ===
Brewing dates from the beginning of civilization in ancient Egypt, and alcoholic beverages were very important at that time. Egyptian brewing began in the city of Hierakonpolis around 3400 BC; its ruins contain the remains of the world's oldest brewery, which was capable of producing up to three hundred gallons (1,136 liters) per day of beer.

Wine was a symbol of power and was imported from abroad, hence it was reserved for royalty and the social elite, while beer was the drink of common society. In the tomb of the Scorpion king, who ruled Hierakonpolis when the brewery was built, approximately 700 wine jars imported from the southern Levant were unearthed. Financial documents recorded that the daily ration of beer for the workers who built the pyramids of Giza was nearly 4 litres, and modern reproductions of the ancient recipe produced a brew weighed in at 5 percent ABV, the same as that of the modern day pint.

Despite the many Egyptian sources describing brewing methods, very few discuss intoxication. However, an annual celebration of the "Drunkenness of Hathor" commemorated the intoxication of the goddess Sekhmet/Hathor with beer disguised as blood by other gods, causing her to fall into a drunken stupor and allowing them to take control over creation, an act which prevented her from exterminating humanity. In honor of this deed a red coloured alcohol was drunk in large quantities during the festival causing similar intoxicated stupors.

Osiris, as opposed to other local and familial gods, was worshiped throughout Egypt and was believed to be the god of the dead, of life, of vegetable regeneration, and of wine, as his death and resurrection were compared to the cycle of withering and regrowth of the vine during the winter and spring. The Oag festival, dedicated to Osiris, was marked by the drinking of wine, and during the late dynastic period the devotees of Osiris would offer prayers and conduct rituals, after which they would drink wine and consume bread, believing that they had been transubstantiated in to the flesh and blood of Osiris. Multiple amphorae were discovered in the graves of pharaohs and elites as provisions for the afterlife and as offerings to Osiris, commonly with labels detailing their origin, maker, and date. Over time, labels eventually included assessments of quality as well, such as "good," (nfr) "very good," (nfr nfr) or "very very good," (nfr nfr nfr) alongside provenance, and it was believed that certain vintages improved with age. Archaeological findings reveal that some wines buried with their owners were several decades old, exceeding the average life expectancy, and therefore assumed to have outlived their creators.

Both beer and wine were deified and offered to gods. Cellars and wine presses even had a god whose hieroglyph was a winepress. The ancient Egyptians made at least 17 types of beer and at least 24 varieties of wine. The most common type of beer was known as hqt. Beer was the drink of common laborers; financial accounts report that the Giza pyramid builders were allotted a daily beer ration of one and one-third gallons. Alcoholic beverages were used for pleasure, nutrition, medicine, ritual, remuneration, and funerary purposes. The latter involved storing the beverages in tombs of the deceased for their use in the after-life.

Numerous accounts of the period stressed the importance of moderation, and these norms were both secular and religious. While Egyptians did not generally appear to define drunkenness as a problem, they warned against taverns (which were often houses of prostitution) and excessive drinking. After reviewing extensive evidence regarding the widespread but generally moderate use of alcoholic beverages, the nutritional biochemist and historian William J. Darby makes a most important observation: all these accounts are warped by the fact that moderate users "were overshadowed by their more boisterous counterparts who added 'color' to history." Thus, the intemperate use of alcohol throughout history receives a disproportionate amount of attention. Those who excessively use alcohol cause problems, draw attention to themselves, are highly visible and cause legislation to be enacted. The vast majority of drinkers, who neither experience nor cause difficulties, are not noteworthy. Consequently, observers and writers largely ignore moderation.

Evidence of distillation comes from alchemists working in Alexandria, Roman Egypt, in the 1st century AD. Distilled water has been known since at least c. 200 AD, when Alexander of Aphrodisias described the process.

=== Ancient Babylon ===
Beer was the major beverage among the Babylonians, and as early as 2700 BC they worshiped a wine goddess and other wine deities. Babylonians regularly used both beer and wine as offerings to their gods. Around 1750 BC, the famous Code of Hammurabi devoted attention to alcohol. However, there were no penalties for drunkenness; in fact, it was not even mentioned. The concern was fair commerce in alcohol. Although it was not a crime, the Babylonians were critical of drunkenness.

=== Ancient India ===
Alcohol production was occurring in India as early as 2000 BCE. Alcoholic beverages in the Indus Valley civilization appeared in the Chalcolithic Era. These beverages were in use between 3000 BC and 2000 BC. Sura, a beverage brewed from rice meal, wheat, sugar cane, grapes, and other fruits, was popular among the Kshatriya warriors and the peasant population. Sura is considered to be a favorite drink of Indra.

The Hindu Ayurvedic texts describe both the beneficent uses of consuming alcoholic beverages and the consequences of intoxication and alcoholic diseases. Ayurvedic texts concluded that alcohol was a medicine if consumed in moderation, but a poison if consumed in excess. Most of the people in India and China, have continued, throughout, to ferment a portion of their crops and nourish themselves with the alcoholic product.

In ancient India, alcohol was also used by the orthodox population. Early Vedic literature suggests the use of alcohol by priestly classes.

The two great Hindu epics, Ramayana and Mahabharata, mention the use of alcohol. In Ramayana, alcohol consumption is depicted in a good/bad dichotomy. The bad faction members consumed meat and alcohol while the good faction members were abstinent vegetarians. However, in Mahabharata, the characters are not portrayed in such a black-white contrast.

Alcohol abstinence was promoted as a moral value in India by Mahavira, the founder of Jainism, and Adi Shankaracharya.

Distillation was known in the ancient Indian subcontinent, evident from baked clay retorts and receivers found at Taxila and Charsadda in modern Pakistan, dating back to the early centuries of the Common Era. These "Gandhara stills" were only capable of producing very weak liquor, as there was no efficient means of collecting the vapors at low heat.

=== Ancient Greece ===
While the art of wine making reached the Hellenic peninsula by about 2000 BC, the first alcoholic beverage to obtain widespread popularity in what is now Greece was mead, a fermented beverage made from honey and water. However, by 1700 BC, wine making was commonplace. During the next thousand years wine drinking assumed the same function so commonly found around the world: It was incorporated into religious rituals. It became important in hospitality, used for medicinal purposes, and became an integral part of daily meals. As a beverage, it was drunk in many ways: warm and chilled, pure and mixed with water, plain and spiced. Alcohol, specifically wine, was considered so important to the Greeks that consumption was considered a defining characteristic of the Hellenic culture between their society and the rest of the world; those who did not drink were considered barbarians.

While habitual drunkenness was rare, intoxication at banquets and festivals was not unusual. In fact, the symposium, a gathering of men for an evening of conversation, entertainment and drinking typically ended in intoxication. However, while there are no references in ancient Greek literature to mass drunkenness among the Greeks, there are references to it among foreign peoples. By 425 BC, warnings against intemperance, especially at symposia, appear to become more frequent.

Xenophon (431–351 BC) and Plato (429–347 BC) both praised the moderate use of wine as beneficial to health and happiness, but both were critical of drunkenness, which appears to have become a problem. Plato also believed that no one under the age of eighteen should be allowed to touch wine. Hippocrates (cir. 460–370 BC) identified numerous medicinal properties of wine, which had long been used for its therapeutic value. Later, both Aristotle (384–322 BC) and Zeno (cir. 336–264 BC) were very critical of drunkenness.

Among Greeks, the Macedonians viewed intemperance as a sign of masculinity and were well known for their drunkenness. Their king, Alexander the Great (356–323 BC), whose mother adhered to the Dionysian cult, developed a reputation for inebriety.

=== Ancient Rome ===
Bacchus, the god of wine – for the Greeks, Dionysus – is the patron deity of agriculture and the theater. He was also known as the Liberator (Eleutherios), freeing one from one's normal self, by madness, ecstasy, or wine. The divine mission of Dionysus was to mingle the music of the aulos and to bring an end to care and worry. The Romans would hold dinner parties where wine was served to the guest all day along with a three course feast. Scholars have discussed Dionysus' relationship to the "cult of the souls" and his ability to preside over communication between the living and the dead.

The Roman belief that wine was a daily necessity made the drink "democratic" and ubiquitous: wine was available to slaves, peasants, women and aristocrats alike. To ensure the steady supply of wine to Roman soldiers and colonists, viticulture and wine production spread to every part of the empire. The Romans diluted their wine before drinking. Wine was also used for religious purposes, in the pouring of libations to deities.

Though beer was drunk in Ancient Rome, it was replaced in popularity by wine. Tacitus wrote disparagingly of the beer brewed by the Germanic peoples of his day. Thracians were also known to consume beer made from rye, even since the 5th century BC, as the ancient Greek logographer Hellanicus of Lesbos says. Their name for beer was brutos, or brytos. The Romans called their brew cerevisia, from the Celtic word for it. Beer was apparently enjoyed by some Roman legionaries. For instance, among the Vindolanda tablets (from Vindolanda in Roman Britain, dated c. 97–103 AD), the cavalry decurion Masculus wrote a letter to prefect Flavius Cerialis inquiring about the exact instructions for his men for the following day. This included a polite request for beer to be sent to the garrison (which had entirely consumed its previous stock of beer).

=== Pre-Columbian America ===
Several Native American civilizations developed alcoholic beverages. Many versions of these beverages are still produced today.

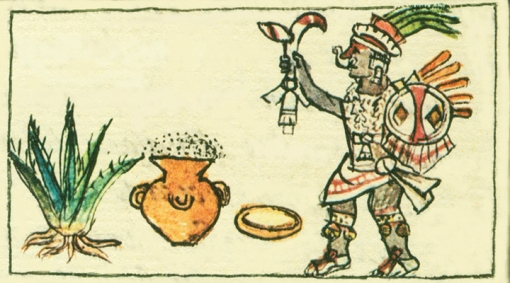
The making of pulque, as illustrated in the Florentine Codex (Book 1 Appendix, fo.40)

Pulque, or octli is an alcoholic beverage made from the fermented juice of the maguey, and is a traditional native beverage of Mesoamerica. Though commonly believed to be a beer, the main carbohydrate is a complex form of fructose rather than starch. Pulque is depicted in Native American stone carvings from as early as AD 200. The origin of pulque is unknown, but because it has a major position in religion, many folk tales explain its origins.

Balché is the name of a honey wine brewed by the Maya. The drink shares its name with the balché tree (Lonchocarpus violaceus), the bark of which is fermented in water together with honey from the indigenous stingless bee.

Tepache is a mildly alcoholic beverage indigenous to Mexico that is created by fermenting pineapple, including the rind, for a short period of three days.

Tejuino, traditional to the Mexican state of Jalisco, is a maize-based beverage that involves fermenting masa dough.

Chicha is a Spanish word for any of variety of traditional fermented beverages from the Andes region of South America. It can be made of maize, manioc root (also called yuca or cassava) or fruits among other things. During the Inca Empire women were taught the techniques of brewing chicha in Acllahuasis (feminine schools). Chicha de jora is prepared by germinating maize, extracting the malt sugars, boiling the wort, and fermenting it in large vessels, traditionally huge earthenware vats, for several days. In some cultures, in lieu of germinating the maize to release the starches, the maize is ground, moistened in the chicha maker's mouth and formed into small balls which are then flattened and laid out to dry. Naturally occurring diastase enzymes in the maker's saliva catalyze the breakdown of starch in the maize into maltose. Chicha de jora has been prepared and consumed in communities throughout in the Andes for millennia. The Inca used chicha for ritual purposes and consumed it in vast quantities during religious festivals. In recent years, however, the traditionally prepared chicha is becoming increasingly rare. Only in a small number of towns and villages in southern Peru and Bolivia is it still prepared. Other traditional drinks made from fermented maize or maize flour include pozol and pox.

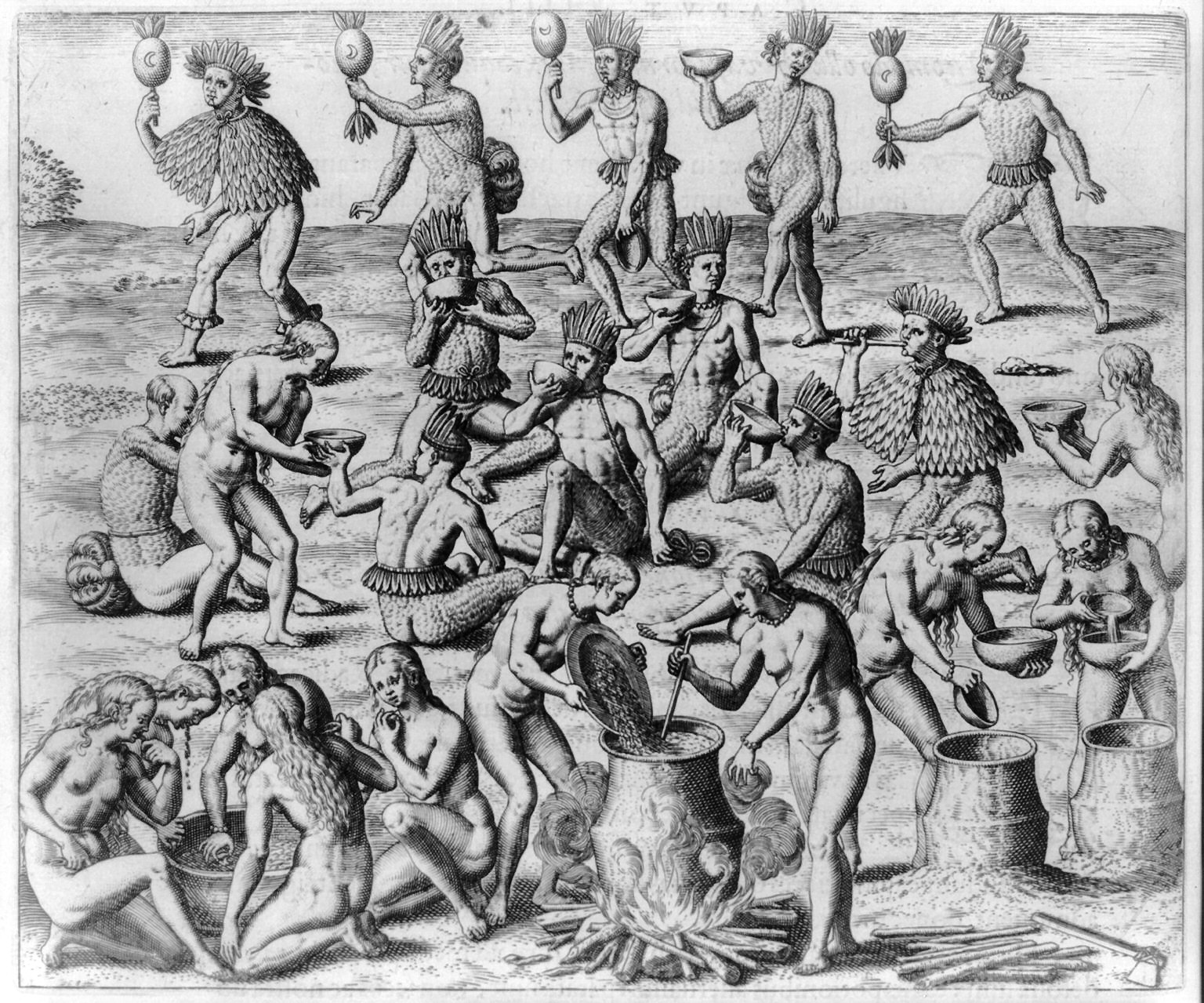
Manioc root being prepared by Indian women to produce an alcoholic drink for ritual consumption, by Theodor de Bry, Frankfurt, 1593. Women in the lower left can be seen spitting into the manioc mash. Salivary enzymes break down complex starches, and saliva introduces bacteria and yeast that hasten the fermentation process.

Cauim is a traditional alcoholic beverage of the Native American populations of Brazil since pre-Columbian times. It is still made today in remote areas throughout Panama and South America. Cauim is very similar to chicha and it is also made by fermenting manioc or maize, sometimes flavored with fruit juices. The Kuna Indians of Panama use plantains. A characteristic feature of the beverage is that the starting material is cooked, chewed, and re-cooked prior to fermentation. As in the making of chicha, enzymes from the saliva of the cauim maker break down the starches into fermentable sugars.

Tiswin, or niwai is a mild, fermented, ceremonial beverage produced by various cultures living in the region encompassing the southwestern United States and northern Mexico. Among the Apache, tiswin was made from maize, while the Tohono O'odham brewed tiswin using saguaro sap. The Tarahumara variety, called tesgüino, can be made from a variety of different ingredients. Recent archaeological evidence has also revealed the production of a similar maize-based intoxicant among the ancestors of the Pueblo peoples.

Fermented cacao beverages were produced during the formative stage of the Olmec Culture (1100–900 BC). Evidence from Puerto Escondido indicates that a weak alcoholic beverage (up to 5% alcohol by volume) was made from fermented cacao pulp and stored in pottery containers.

In addition:

- The Iroquois fermented sap from the sugar maple tree to produce a mildly alcoholic beverage.
- The Chiricahua prepared a kind of corn beer called tula-pah using sprouted corn kernels, dried and ground, flavored with locoweed or lignum vitae roots, placed in water and allowed to ferment.
- The Coahuiltecan in Texas combined mountain laurel with agave sap to create an alcoholic drink similar to pulque.
- The Zunis made fermented beverages from aloe, maguey, corn, prickly pear, pitaya and grapes.
- The Creek of Georgia and Cherokee of the Carolinas used berries and other fruits to make alcoholic beverages.
- The Huron made a mild beer by soaking corn in water to produce a fermented gruel to be consumed at tribal feasts.
- The Kwakiutl of Vancouver Island produced a mildly alcoholic drink using elderberry juice, black chitons, and tobacco.
- Both the Aleuts and Yuit of Kodiak Island in Alaska were observed making alcoholic drinks from fermented raspberries.

== Medieval period ==
=== Medieval Middle East ===
Medieval Muslim chemists such as Jābir ibn Ḥayyān (Latin: Geber, ninth century) and Abū Bakr al-Rāzī (Latin: Rhazes, c. 865–925) experimented extensively with the distillation of various substances. The distillation of wine is attested in Arabic works attributed to al-Kindī (c. 801–873 CE) and to al-Fārābī (c. 872–950), and in the 28th book of al-Zahrāwī's (Latin: Abulcasis, 936–1013) Kitāb al-Taṣrīf (later translated into Latin as Liber servatoris).

=== Medieval China and medieval India ===
Distillation in China could have begun during the Eastern Han dynasty (during the 1st & 2nd centuries), but the earliest archaeological evidence found so far indicates that the true distillation of alcohol began sometime during the Jin or Southern Song dynasties. A still has been found at an archaeological site in Qinglong, Hebei, dating to the 12th century.

In India, the true distillation of alcohol was introduced from the Middle East. It was in wide use in the Delhi Sultanate by the 14th century.

=== Medieval Europe ===
Schematic of a still

The process of distillation spread from the Middle East to Italy, where evidence of the distillation of alcohol appears from the School of Salerno in the 12th century. The works of Taddeo Alderotti (1223–1296) describe a method for concentrating alcohol involving repeated fractional distillation through a water-cooled still, by which an alcohol purity of 90% could be obtained.

In 1500, German alchemist Hieronymus Braunschweig published Liber de arte destillandi (The Book of the Art of Distillation), the first book solely dedicated to the subject of distillation, followed in 1512 by a much expanded version. In 1651, John French published The Art of Distillation the first major English compendium of practice, though it has been claimed that much of it derives from Braunschweig's work. This includes diagrams showing an industrial rather than bench scale of the operation.

Names like "life water" have continued to be the inspiration for the names of several types of beverages, like Gaelic whisky, French eaux-de-vie and possibly vodka. Also, the Scandinavian akvavit spirit gets its name from the Latin phrase aqua vitae.

At times and places of poor public sanitation (such as medieval Europe), the consumption of alcoholic drinks was a way of avoiding water-borne diseases such as cholera.

== Early modern period ==
During the early modern period (1500–1800), Protestant leaders such as Martin Luther, John Calvin, the leaders of the Anglican Church, and even the Puritans did not differ substantially from the teachings of the Catholic Church: alcohol was a gift of God and created to be used in moderation for pleasure, enjoyment and health; drunkenness was viewed as a sin (see Christian views on alcohol).

From this period through at least the beginning of the 18th century, attitudes toward drinking were characterized by a continued recognition of the positive nature of moderate consumption and an increased concern over the negative effects of drunkenness. The latter, which was generally viewed as arising out of the increased self-indulgence of the time, was seen as a threat to spiritual salvation and societal well-being. English philosopher Thomas Hobbes bemoaned in his Leviathan how "the variety of behaviour in men that have drunk too much is the same with that of madmen", reflecting growing ethical concerns toward alcohol. Intoxication was also inconsistent with the emerging emphasis on rational mastery of self and world and on work and efficiency.

In spite of the ideal of moderation, consumption of alcohol was often high. In the 16th century, alcohol beverage consumption reached 100 liters per person per year in Valladolid, Spain, and Polish peasants consumed up to three liters of beer per day. In Coventry, England, the average amount of beer and ale consumed was about 17 pints per person per week, compared to about three pints today; nationwide, consumption was about one pint per day per capita. Swedish beer consumption may have been 40 times higher than in modern Sweden. English sailors received a ration of a gallon of beer per day, while soldiers received two-thirds of a gallon. In Denmark, the usual consumption of beer appears to have been a gallon per day for adult laborers and sailors. Modern beer is much stronger than the beers of the past. While current beers are 3–5% alcohol, the beer drunk in the historical past was generally 1% or so. This was known as 'small beer'.

However, the production and distribution of spirits spread slowly. Spirit drinking was still largely for medicinal purposes throughout most of the 16th century. It has been said of distilled alcohol that "the sixteenth century created it; the seventeenth century consolidated it; the eighteenth popularized it."

A beverage that clearly made its debut during the 17th century was sparkling champagne. The credit for that development goes primarily and erroneously to Dom Perignon, the wine-master in a French abbey. Although the oldest recorded sparkling wine is Blanquette de Limoux, in 1531, the English scientist and physician Christopher Merret documented the addition of sugar to a finished wine to create a second fermentation six years before Dom Perignon joined the Abbey of Hautvillers and almost 40 years before it was claimed that he invented Champagne. Around 1668, Perignon used strong bottles, invented a more efficient cork (and one that could contain the effervescence in those strong bottles), and began developing the technique of blending the contents. However, another century would pass before problems, especially bursting bottles, would be solved and champagne would become popular.

The original grain spirit, whisky (or whiskey in Hiberno-English) and its specific origins are unknown but the distillation of whisky has been performed in Ireland and Scotland for centuries. The first confirmed written record of whisky comes from 1405 in Ireland, the production of whisky from malted barley is first mentioned in Scotland in an entry from 1494, although both countries could have distilled grain alcohol before this date.

Distilled spirit was generally flavored with juniper berries. The resulting beverage was known as jenever, the Dutch word for "juniper." The French changed the name to genievre, which the English changed to "geneva" and then modified to "gin." Originally used for medicinal purposes, the use of gin as a social drink did not grow rapidly at first. However, in 1690, England passed "An Act for the Encouraging of the Distillation of Brandy and Spirits from Corn" and within four years the annual production of distilled spirits, most of which was gin, reached nearly one million gallons. "Corn" in the British English of the time meant "grain" in general, while in American English "corn" refers principally to maize.

The dawn of the 18th century saw the British Parliament pass legislation designed to encourage the use of grain for distilling spirits. In 1685, consumption of gin had been slightly over one-half million gallons but by 1714 it stood at two million gallons. In 1727, official (declared and taxed) production reached five million gallons; six years later the London area alone produced eleven million gallons of gin. The English government actively promoted gin production to utilize surplus grain and to raise revenue. Encouraged by public policy, very cheap spirits flooded the market at a time when there was little stigma attached to drunkenness and when the growing urban poor in London sought relief from the newfound insecurities and harsh realities of urban life. Thus developed the so-called Gin Epidemic.

While the negative effects of that phenomenon may have been exaggerated, Parliament passed legislation in 1736 to discourage consumption by prohibiting the sale of gin in quantities of less than two gallons and raising the tax on it dramatically. However, the peak in consumption was reached seven years later, when the nation of six and one-half million people drank over 18 million gallons of gin. And most was consumed by the small minority of the population then living in London and other cities; people in the countryside largely consumed beer, ale and cider.

After its peak, gin consumption rapidly declined. From eighteen million gallons in 1743, it dropped to just over seven million gallons in 1751 and to less than two million by 1758, and generally declined to the end of the century. A number of factors appear to have converged to discourage consumption of gin. These include the production of higher quality beer of lower price, rising corn prices and taxes which eroded the price advantage of gin, a temporary ban on distilling, an increasing criticism of drunkenness, a newer standard of behavior that criticized coarseness and excess, increased tea and coffee consumption, an increase in piety and increasing industrialization with a consequent emphasis on sobriety and labor efficiency.

While drunkenness was still an accepted part of life in the 18th century, the 19th century would bring a change in attitudes as a result of increasing industrialization and the need for a reliable and punctual work force. Self-discipline was needed in place of self-expression, and task orientation had to replace relaxed conviviality. Drunkenness would come to be defined as a threat to industrial efficiency and growth.

Ethanol can produce a state of general anesthesia and historically has been used for this purpose (Dundee et al., 1969).

=== The Thirteen Colonies ===
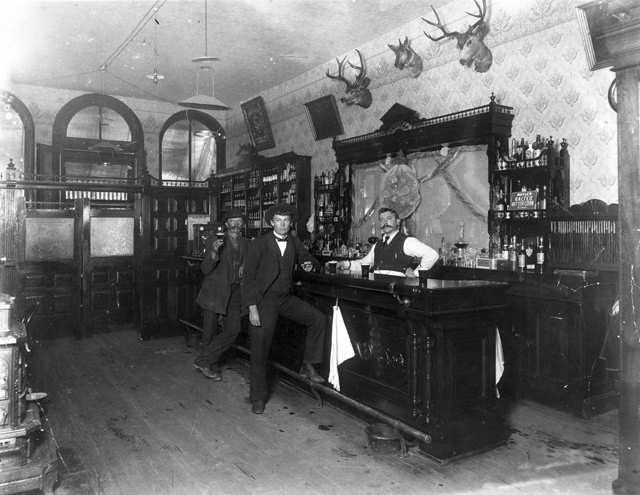
Interior view of the Toll Gate Saloon in Black Hawk, Colorado (1897)

Alcoholic beverages played an important role in the Thirteen Colonies from their early days. For example, the Mayflower shipped more beer than water when it departed for the New World in 1620. While this may seem strange viewed from the modern context, note that drinking wine and beer at that time was safer than drinking water – which was usually taken from sources also used to dispose of sewage and garbage. Alcohol was also an effective analgesic, provided energy necessary for hard work, and generally enhanced the quality of life.

For hundreds of years the English ancestors of the colonists had consumed beer and ale. Both in England and in the New World, people of both sexes and all ages typically drank beer with their meals. Because importing a continuing supply of beer was expensive, the early settlers brewed their own. However, it was difficult to make the beer they were accustomed to because wild yeasts caused problems in fermentation and resulted in a bitter, unappetizing brew. Although wild hops grew in New England, hop seeds were ordered from England in order to cultivate an adequate supply for traditional beer. In the meantime, the colonists improvised a beer made from red and black spruce twigs boiled in water, as well as a ginger beer.

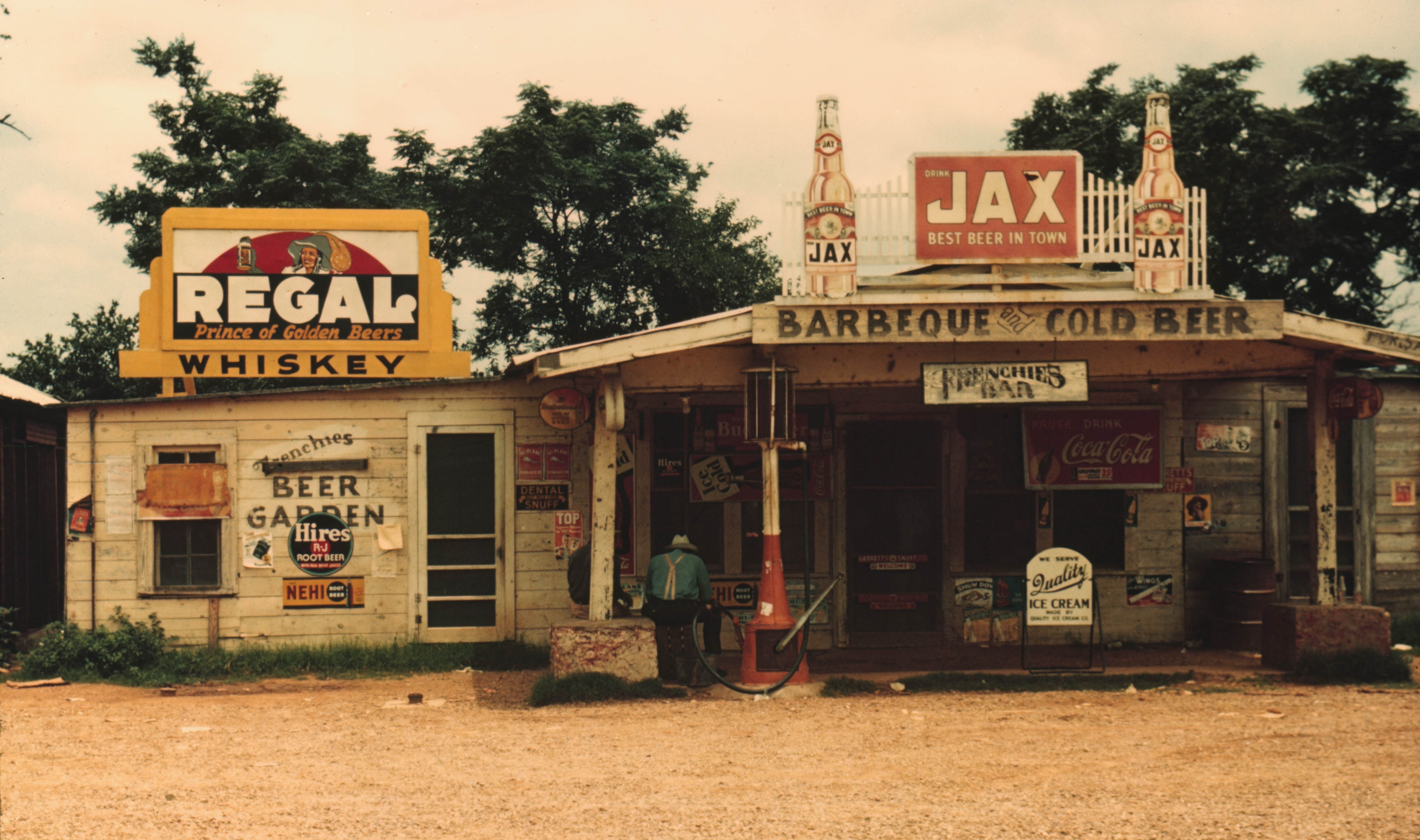
A Depression-era bar in Melrose, Louisiana

Beer was designated X, XX, or XXX according to its alcohol content. The colonists also learned to make a wide variety of wine from fruits. They additionally made wine from such products as flowers, herbs, and even oak leaves. Early on, French vine-growers were brought to the New World to teach settlers how to cultivate grapes.

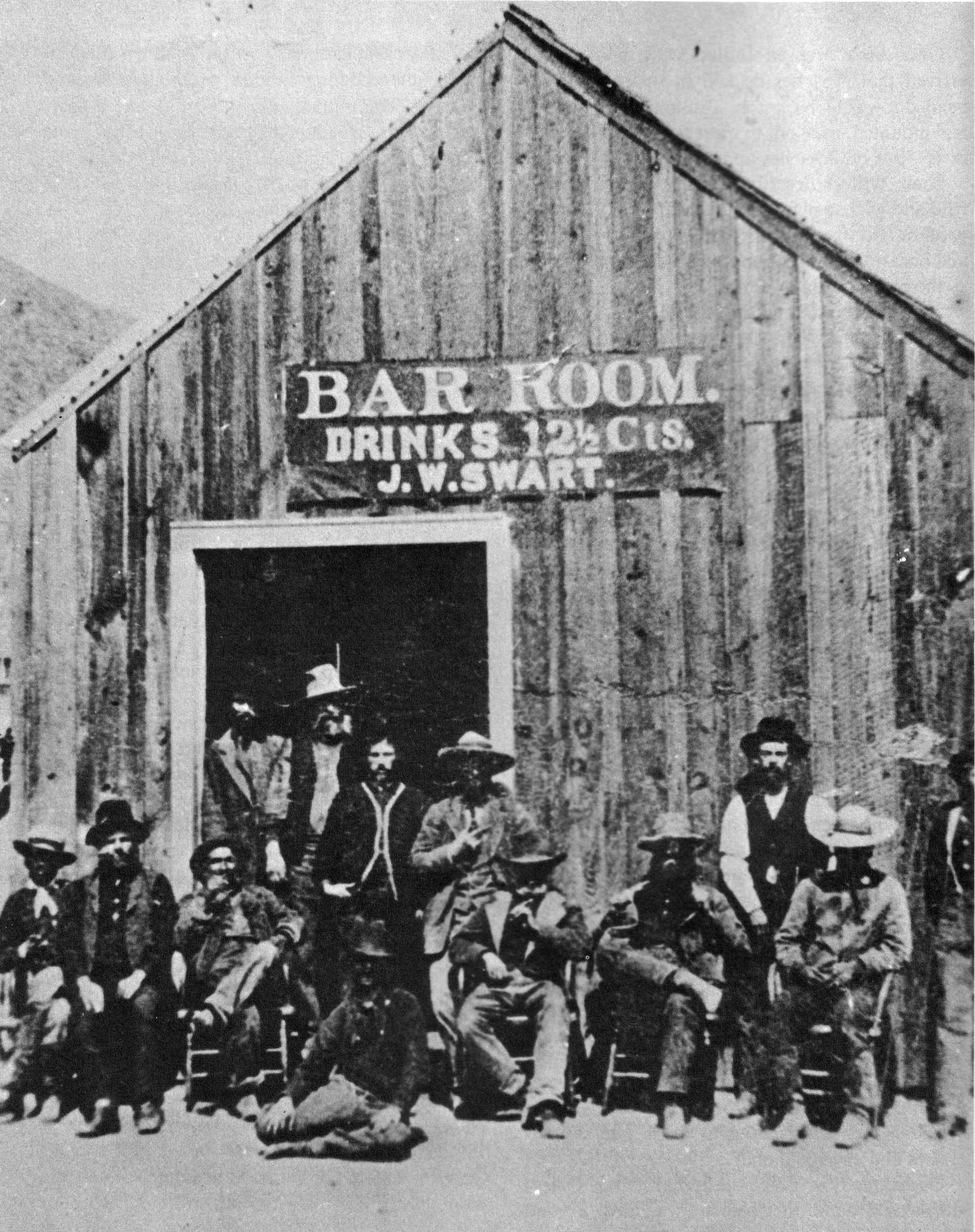
J.W. Swarts Saloon in Charleston, Arizona in 1885

Colonists adhered to the traditional belief that distilled spirits were aqua vitae, or water of life. However, rum was not commonly available until after 1650, when it was imported from the Caribbean. The cost of rum dropped after the colonists began importing molasses and cane sugar directly and distilled their own rum. By 1657, a rum distillery was operating in Boston. It was highly successful and within a generation the production of rum became colonial New England's largest and most prosperous industry.

Almost every important town from Massachusetts to the Carolinas had a rum distillery to meet the local demand, which had increased dramatically. Rum was often enjoyed in mixed drinks, including flip. This was a popular winter beverage made of rum and beer sweetened with sugar and warmed by plunging a red-hot fireplace poker into the serving mug. Alcohol was viewed positively while its excessive use was condemned. Increase Mather (d. 1723) expressed the common view in a sermon against drunkenness: "Drink is in itself a good creature of God, and to be received with thankfulness, but the abuse of drink is from Satan; the wine is from God, but the drunkard is from the Devil."

=== The United States of America ===
In colonial period of America from around 1623, when a Plymouth minister named William Blackstone began distributing apples and flowers, up until the mid-1800s, hard cider was the primary alcoholic drink of the people. Hard cider was prominent throughout this entire period and nothing compared in scope or availability. It was one of the few aspects of American culture that all the colonies shared. Settlement along the frontier often included a legal requirement whereby an orchard of mature apple trees bearing fruit within three years of settlement were required before a land title was officially granted. For example, The Ohio Company required settlers to plant not less than fifty apple trees and twenty peach trees within three years. These plantings would guarantee land titles. In 1767, the average New England family was consuming seven barrels of hard cider annually, which equates to about 35-gallons per person. Around the mid-1800s, newly arrived immigrants from Germany and elsewhere increased beer's popularity, and the temperance movement and continued westward expansion caused farmers to abandon their cider orchards.

In the early 19th century, Americans had inherited a hearty drinking tradition. Drinking hard liquor was a universally popular occurrence in early nineteenth-century America. Many types of alcohol were consumed. One reason for this heavy drinking was attributed to an overabundance of corn on the western frontier, which encouraged the widespread production of cheap whiskey. It was at this time that alcohol became an important part of the American diet. In the 1820s, Americans drank seven gallons of alcohol per person annually.

In colonial America, water contamination was common. Two means to ensure that waterborne illness, for example typhoid and cholera, was not conveyed by water was to boil it in the process of making tea or coffee, or to use it to make alcohol. As a result, alcohol consumption was much higher in the nineteenth century than it is today -- 7.1 US gallons (27 L) of pure alcohol per person per year. Before the construction of the Erie Canal, transportation of grain from the west was cost prohibitive; farmers instead converted their grain to alcohol for shipping eastward. This dependence on alcohol as a revenue source led to the Whiskey Rebellion of 1794. Later in the nineteenth century opposition to alcohol grew in the form of the temperance movement, culminating in Prohibition in the United States from 1920 to 1933.

=== Sub-Saharan Africa ===
Palm wine played an important social role in many African societies.

Thin, gruel-like, alcoholic beverages have existed in traditional societies all across the African continent, created through the fermentation of sorghum, millet, bananas, or in modern times, maize or cassava.

=== Hawaii ===
Okolehao is produced by Native Hawaiians from juice extracted from the roots of the ti plant.

== See also ==
- Drunken monkey hypothesis
- History of beer
- History of wine
- Food history
- Alcohol and Native Americans
- Alcohol and Drugs History Society
- Distilled beverage (Includes history section)
- Drinking culture
