= Chicha =

Beverage from prehispanic Latin America

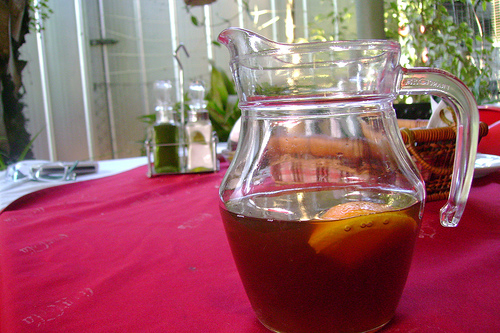
- A jug of chicha morada served with pipeño, Olmué, Chile
- Type: Beverage

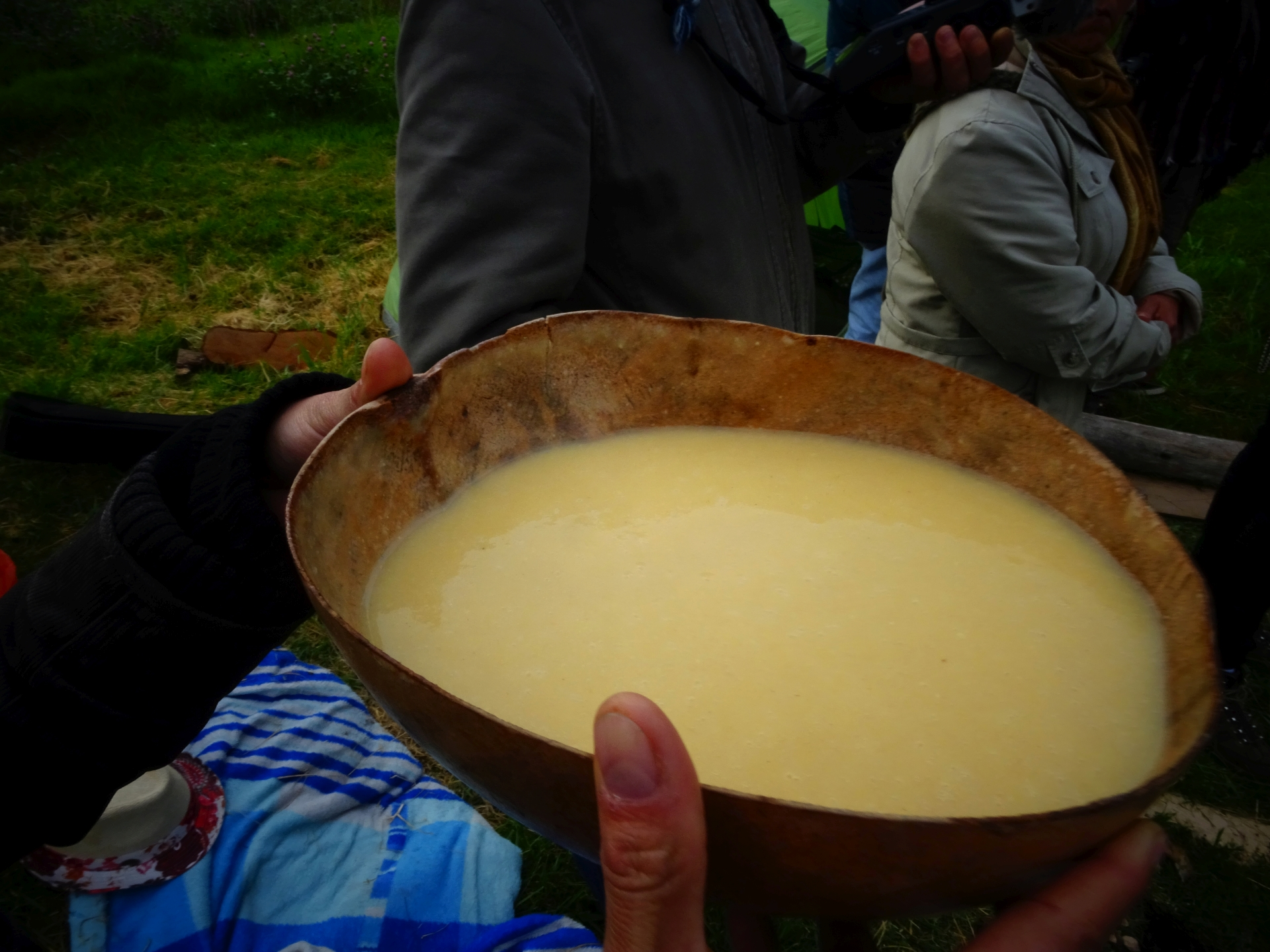
Chicha served at the yearly Fiesta del Huán, to celebrate the December solstice at the Sun Temple in Sogamoso, Boyacá, Colombia

Chicha is a fermented (alcoholic) or non-fermented beverage of Latin America, emerging from the Andes and Amazonia regions. In both the pre- and post-Spanish conquest periods, corn beer (chicha de jora) made from a variety of maize landraces has been the most common form of chicha. However, chicha is also made from a variety of other cultigens and wild plants, including, among others, quinoa (Chenopodium quinia), kañiwa (Chenopodium pallidicaule), peanut, manioc (also called yuca or cassava), palm fruit, rice, potato, oca (Oxalis tuberosa), and chañar (Geoffroea decorticans). There are many regional variations of chicha. In the Inca Empire, chicha had ceremonial and ritual uses.

== Etymology and related phrases ==
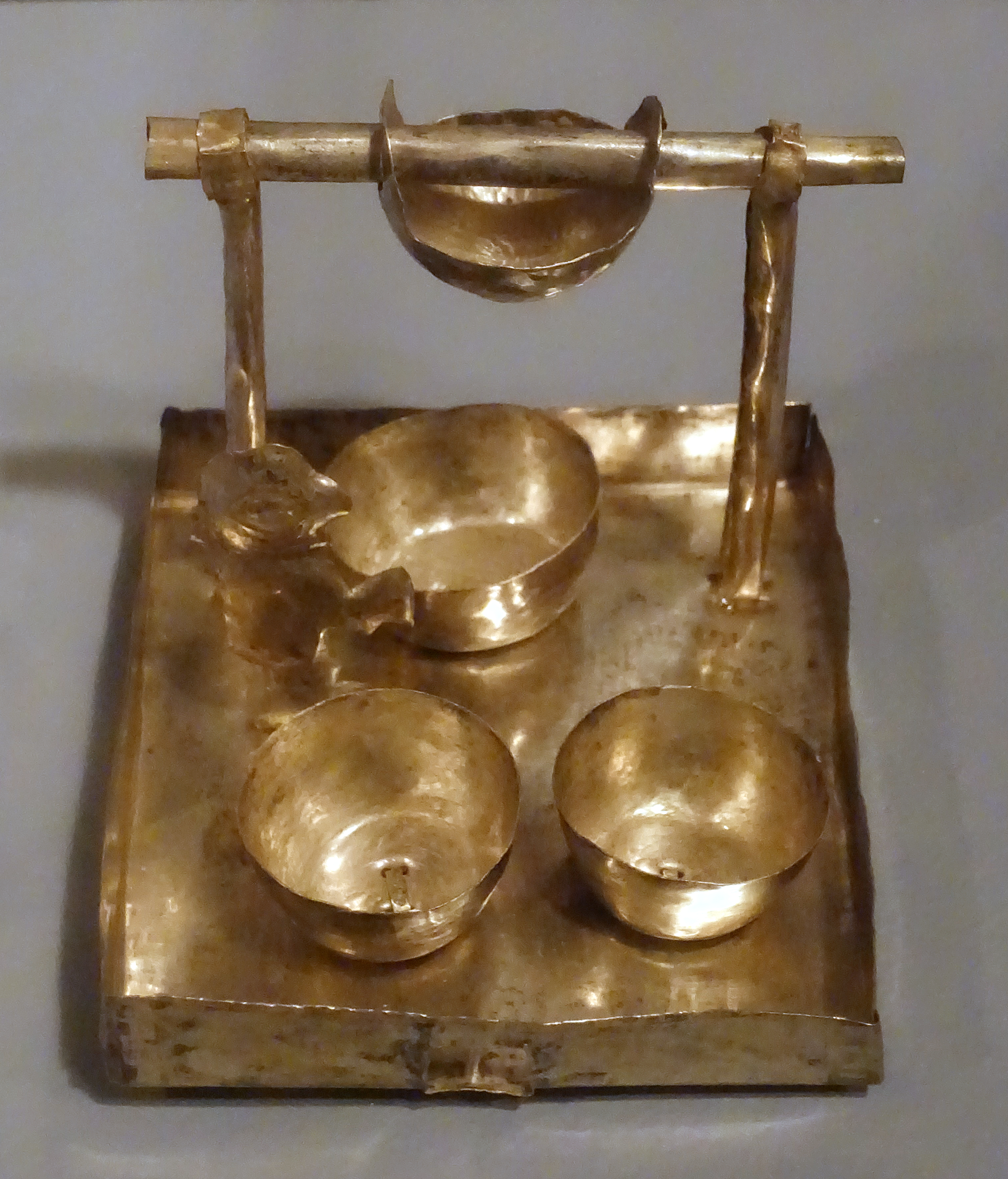
Model tray for making chicha, Peru, Chancay-Chimu, north central-coast, c. 1400 AD, silvered copper, Krannert Art Museum

The exact origin of the word chicha is debated. One belief is that the word chicha is of Taino origin and became a generic term used by the Spanish to define any and all fermented beverages brewed by indigenous peoples in the Americas. It is possible that one of the first uses of the term chicha was from a group of people who lived in Colombia and Panama, the Guna. However, according to the Real Academia Española and other authors, the word chicha comes from the Guna word chichab, or chiab 'maize'. According to Don Luis G. Iza it comes from the Nahuatl word chichiatl, which means "fermented water", the verb chicha meaning "to sour a drink" and the noun atl meaning "water". These etymologies are not mutually exclusive. Additionally, chicha is thought by Miguel Ángel Quesada Pacheco to originate from the long-extinct and poorly attested Chocoan language Cueva.

The Spanish idiom ni chicha ni limonada (neither chicha nor lemonade) means "neither one thing nor another" (roughly equivalent to the English "neither fish nor fowl").

== Maize chicha ==
=== Preparation ===
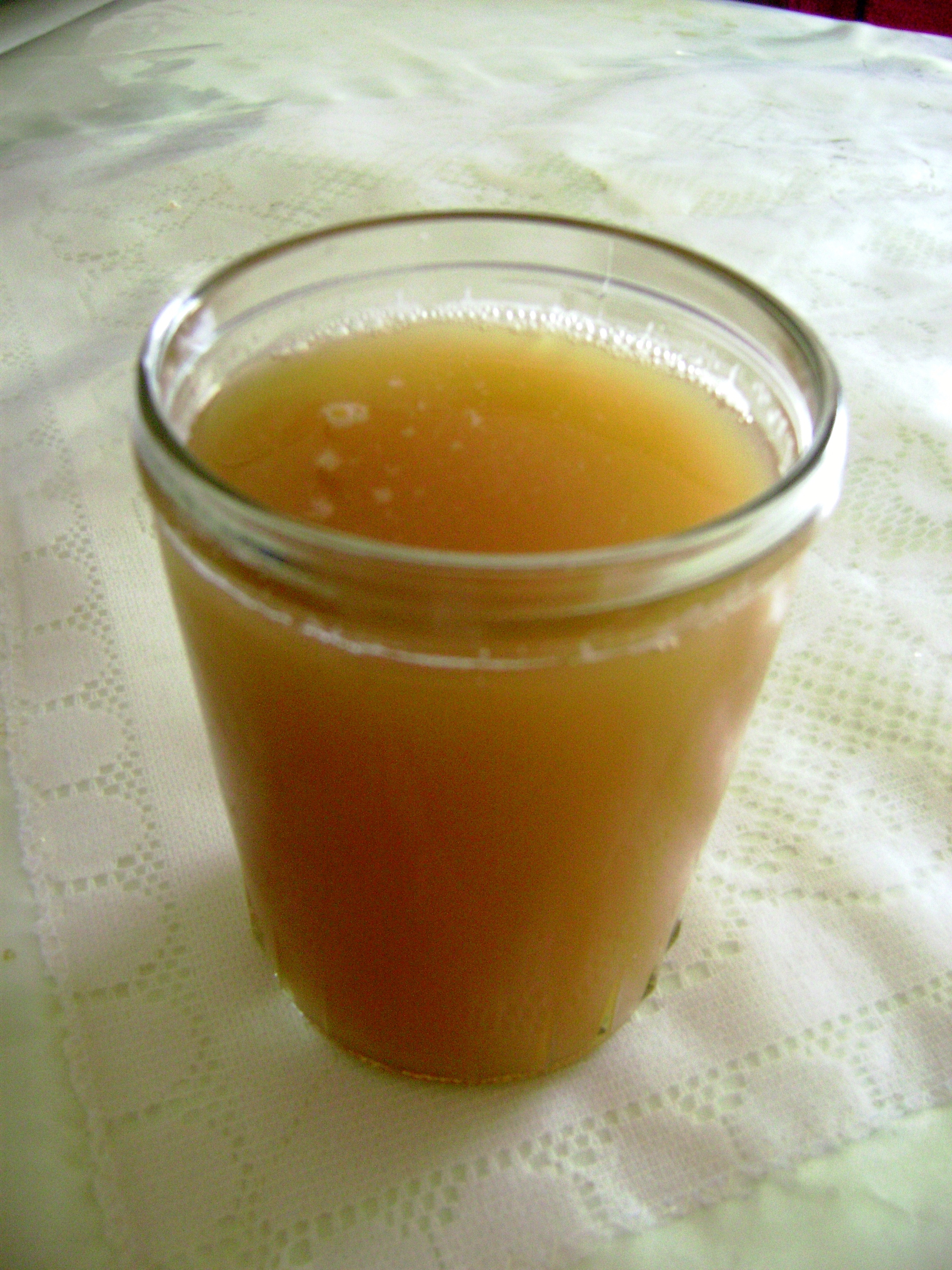
A glass of chicha de jora, a type of corn beer

Chicha de jora is a corn beer prepared by germinating maize, extracting the malt sugars, boiling the wort, and fermenting it in large vessels, traditionally huge earthenware vats, for several days. The original Quechua name is aqa ~ aqha (Ayacucho vs. Cuzco-Bolivia varieties), and it is traditionally made and sold in chicherías, called also aqa wasi or aqha wasi (lit. "chicha house").

Usually, the brewer makes chicha in large amounts and uses many of these clay vats to do so. These vats break down easily and can only be used a few times. The brewers can arrange their vessels in rows, with fires in the middle, to reduce heat loss.

The process for making chicha is essentially the same as the process for the production of malted barley beer. It is traditionally made with Jora corn, a type of malted corn from the Andes. The specific type or combination of corn used in the making of chicha de jora shows where it was made. Some add quinoa or other adjuncts to give it consistency; then it is boiled. During the boiling process, the chicha is stirred and aerated so as to prevent overboiling. Chancaca, a hard form of sugar (like sugar cane), helps with the fermentation process.

After the milling of the corn and the brewing of the drink, the chicha is then sieved. Traditionally, it is sieved through a large cloth. This is to separate the corn from the desired chicha.

In some cultures, instead of germinating the maize to release the starches therein, the maize is ground, moistened by saliva in the chicha maker's mouth, and formed into small balls, which are then flattened and laid out to dry. Naturally occurring ptyalin enzymes in the maker's saliva catalyses the breakdown of starch in the maize into maltose. This process of chewing grains or other starches was used in the production of alcoholic beverages in pre-modern cultures around the world, such as Kuchikamizake in Japan (a type of sake). Chicha prepared in this manner is known as chicha de muko.

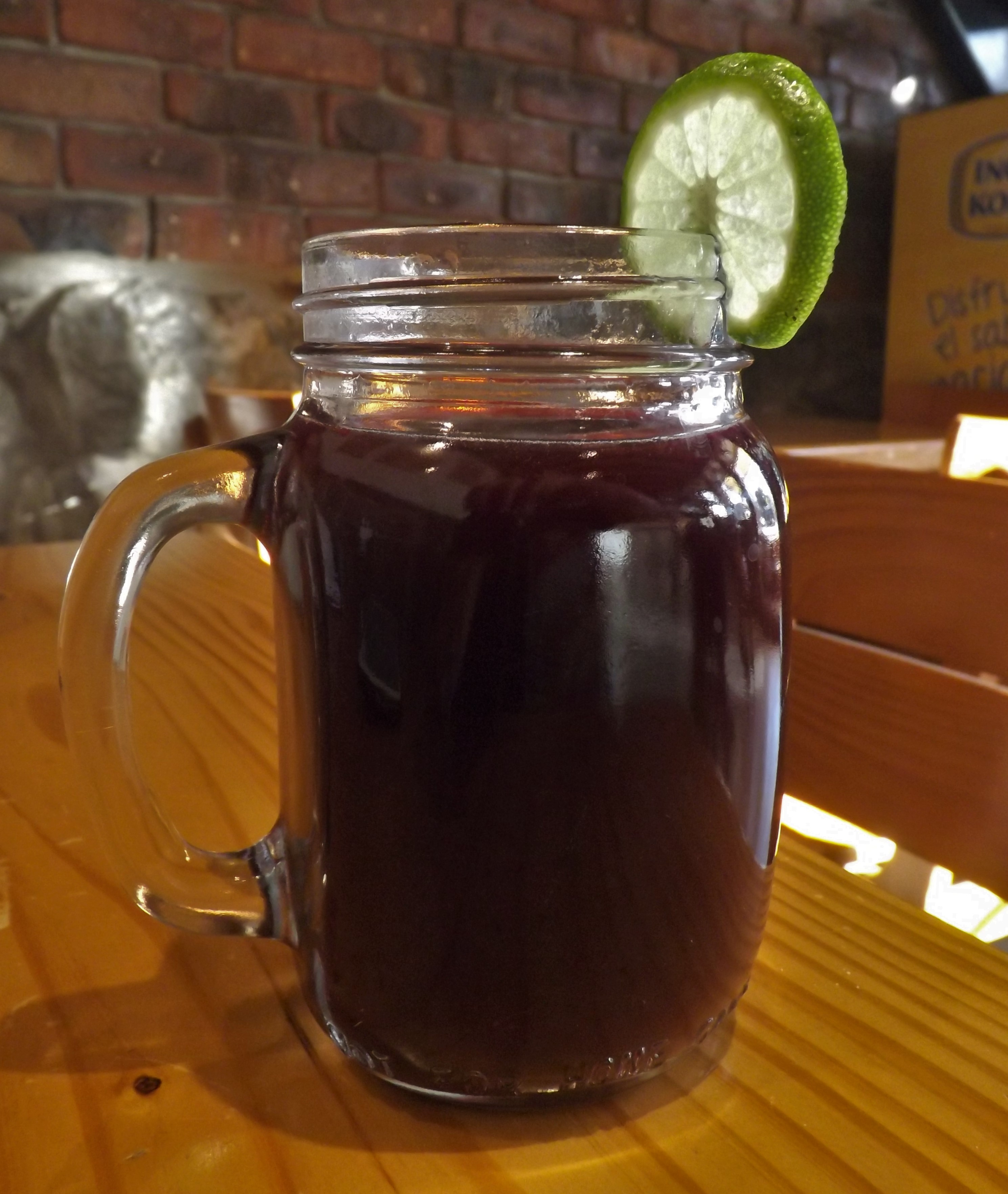
Chicha morada in a glass, garnished with a slice of lime

Chicha morada is a non-fermented chicha usually made from ears of purple maize (maíz morado), which are boiled with pineapple rind, cinnamon, and cloves. This gives a strong, purple-colored liquid, which is then mixed with sugar and lemon. This beverage is usually taken as a refreshment. Chicha morada is common in Bolivian and Peruvian cultures and is generally drunk as an accompaniment to food.

Women are most associated with the production of chicha. Men and children are still involved with the process of making chicha, but women control the production and distribution. For many women in Andean society, making and selling chicha is a key part of their identity because it provides a substantial amount of political power and leverage.

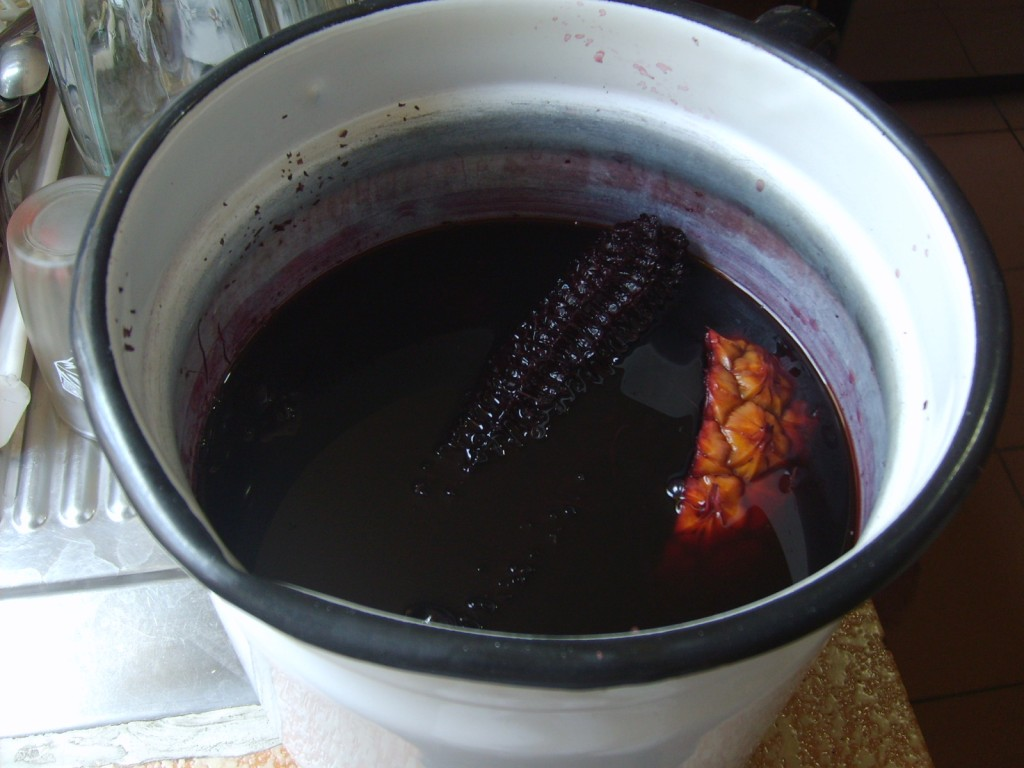
Chicha morada Peru; unfermented chicha made from purple maize and boiled with pineapple and spices

=== Use ===
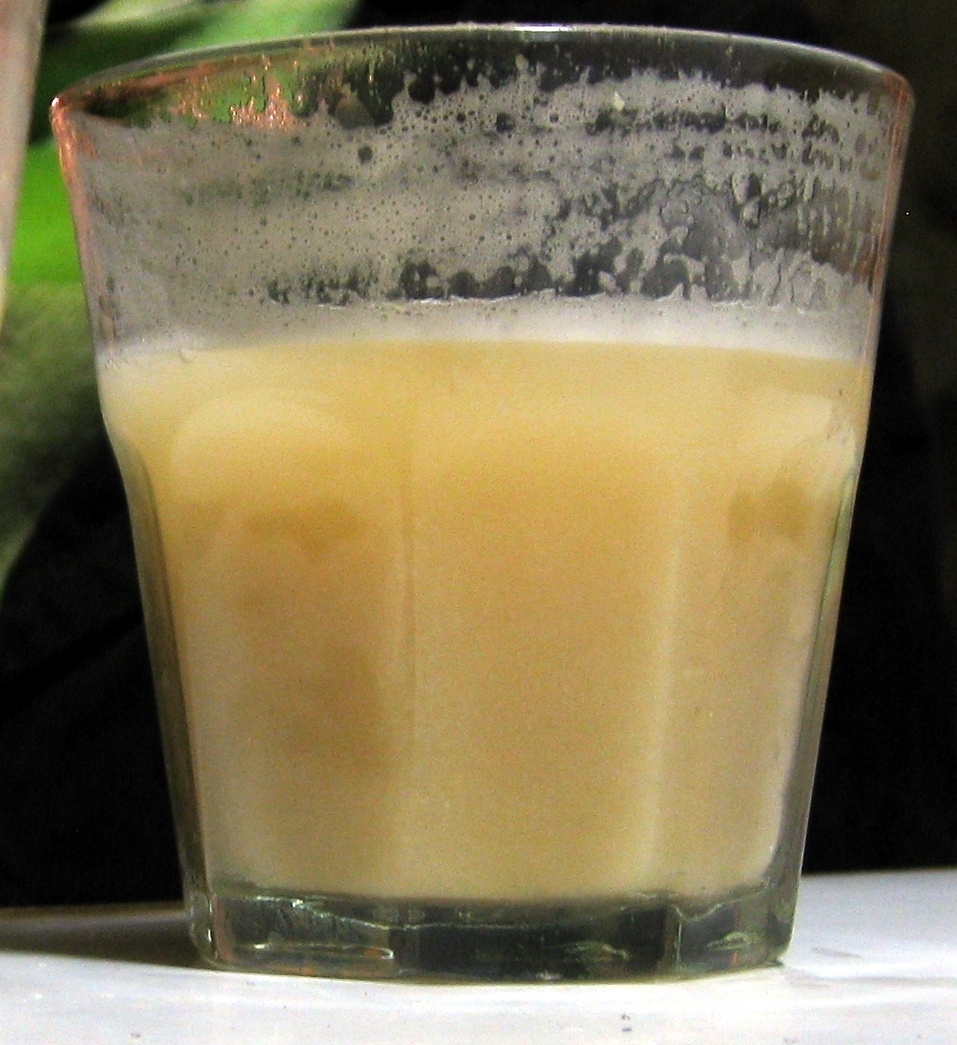
Chicha de jora

Chicha de jora has been prepared and consumed in communities throughout the Andes for millennia. The Inca used chicha for ritual purposes and consumed it in vast quantities during religious festivals. Mills in which it was probably made were found at Machu Picchu.

During the Inca Empire women were taught the techniques of brewing chicha in Aqlla Wasi (feminine schools).

Chicherias (chicha taverns) were places to consume chicha. Many have historically been unlicensed, home-based businesses that produce chicha on site.

Normally sold in large caporal (1/2 liter) glasses to be drunk on location, or by liter, if taken home, chicha is generally sold straight from the earthenware chomba where it was brewed. On the Northern coast of Peru, it is often served in a dried gourd known as a Poto while in the Peruvian Andes it is often served in a qero. Qeros are traditionally made from wood with intricate designs carved on the outside. In colonial times, qeros transitioned to be painted with figurative depictions on the exterior instead of carving. Some qeros were also made of metals and many are now made of glass. Inca leaders used identical pairs of qeros to extend invitations to drink. These invitations represented an indebtedness upon the invitee. In this way, the drinking of chicha via qeros cemented relationships of power and alliances between people and groups.

Chicha can be mixed with Coca Sek, a Colombian beverage made from coca leaf.

== Regional variations ==
There are a number of regional varieties of chicha, which can be roughly divided into lowland (Amazonia) and highland varieties, of which there are many.

=== Amazonia ===
Throughout the Amazon Basin (including the interiors of Ecuador, Peru, Colombia, and Brazil), chicha is usually made from cassava, but also cooking plantain is known to be used. Traditionally, the women chew the washed and peeled cassava and spit the juice into a bowl. Cassava root is very starchy, and therefore the enzymes in the preparer's saliva rapidly convert the starch to simple sugar, which is further converted by wild yeast or bacteria into alcohol. After the juice has fermented in the bowl for a few hours, the result will be mildly sweet and sour chicha, similar in appearance to defatted milk. In Colombian Amazonia, the drink is called masato.

It is traditional for families to offer chicha to arriving guests. Children are offered new chicha that has not fermented, whereas adults are offered fermented chicha; the most highly fermented chicha, with its significant alcohol content, is reserved for men.

=== Bolivia ===
In Bolivia chicha is most often made from maize, especially in the highlands, but amaranth chicha is also traditional and popular. Chicha made from sweet manioc, plantain, or banana is also common in the lowlands. Bolivian chicha often has alcohol. A good description of the preparation of a Bolivian way to make chicha can be found in Cutler, Hugh and Martin Cardenas, "Chicha a Native South American Beer".

=== Chile ===
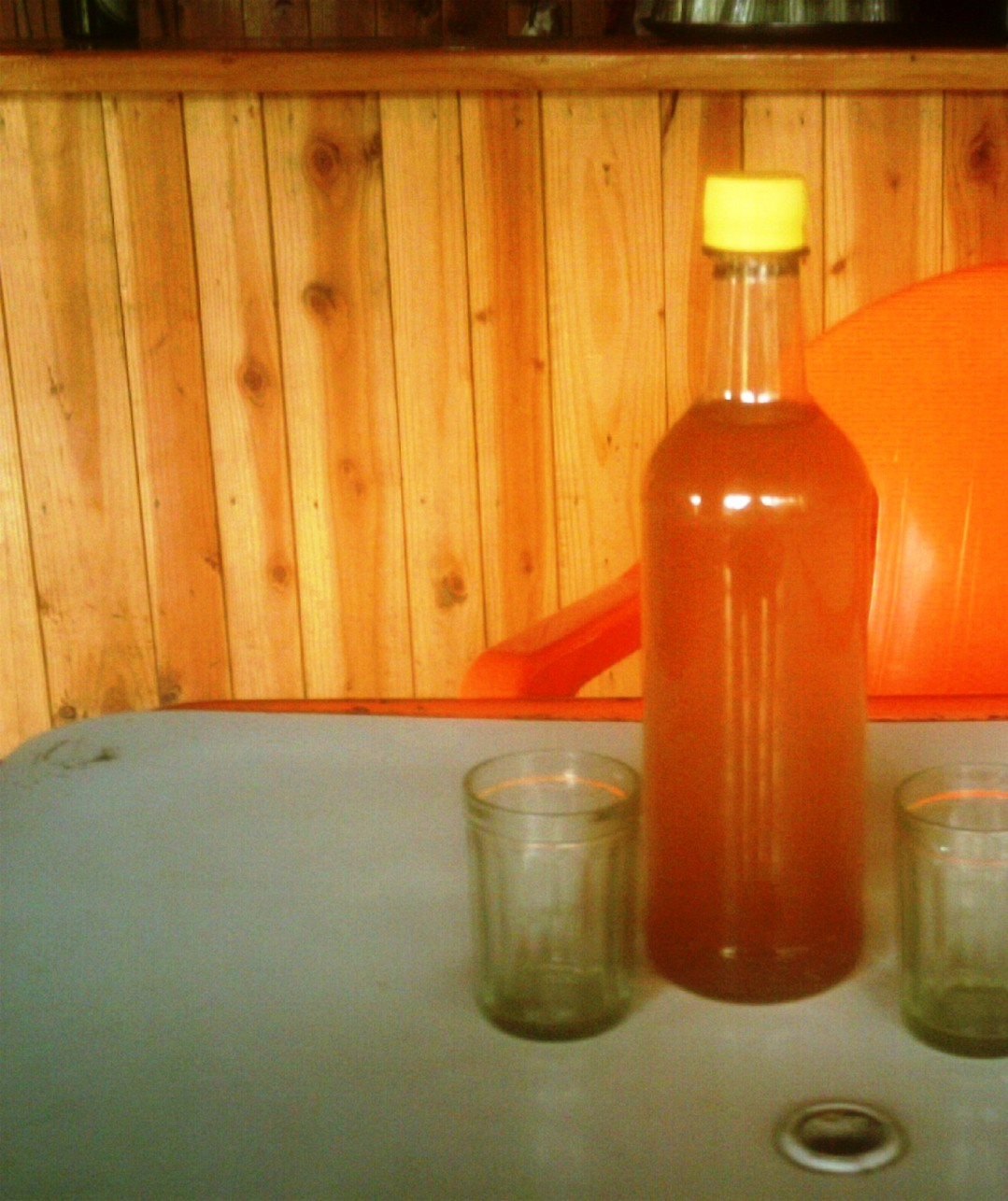
Apple chicha from Punucapa, Southern Chile

In Chile, there are two main types of chicha: apple chicha produced in southern Chile and grape chicha produced in central Chile. Both are alcoholic beverages with no distillation, only fermentation. Chicha is mostly consumed in the countryside and during festivities, such as Fiestas Patrias on September 18. Chicha is usually not found in formal supermarkets unless close to September 18.

Sites like Máfil in southern Chile were traditional centres of apple chicha produce that was sold in the nearby city of Valdivia. With the introduction of beer by the German settlers who arrived in the second half of the 19th century the chicha production in Máfil declined and is now done by few and mostly for consumption within the family.

=== Colombia ===
In Bogotá, the capital of present-day Colombia, the recipe is simple; cooked maize is ground with black panela in a large pot. The mix is let to ferment for seven to eight days depending on the degree of liquor desired. Chicha was outlawed in Colombia in 1949 and remains formally illegal, but brewing continued underground and the drink is openly available in some areas.

=== Ecuador ===
A major chicha beer festival, Yamor, is held in early September in Otavalo. It has its roots in the 1970s, when the locals decided to revive an ancient tradition of marking the maize harvest before the September equinox. These locals spoke Quechua, and "Yamor" was the name for chicha. The festival includes bands, parades, fireworks, and chicha sampling.

=== El Salvador ===
In El Salvador, chicha usually refers to an alcoholic drink made with maize, panela, and pineapple. It is used as a drink and also as an ingredient on many traditional dishes, such as gallo en chicha, a local version of coq au vin. A non-alcoholic version usually named fresco de chicha (chicha soft drink) is made with the same ingredients, but without allowing it to ferment.

=== Honduras ===
In Honduras, the Pech people practiced a ritual called Kesh where a shaman contacted the spiritual world. A Kesh could be held for various reasons, a few including to help appease the angry spirits or to help a deceased member of the community on his or her journey after death. During this ritual, they drank Chicha made of yuca, minia, and yuca tamales. The ritual is no longer practiced, but the drink is still reserved for special occasions with family only.

=== Nicaragua ===
In Managua and Granada, "chicha de maiz" is a typical drink, unfermented and served very cold. It is often flavored with banana or vanilla flavors, and its saleswomen can be heard calling "¡Chicha, cafe y jugo frio!" in the squares.

Nicaraguan "chicha de maiz" is made by soaking the corn in water overnight. On the following day it is ground and placed in water, red food coloring is added, and the whole mixture is cooked. Once cooled, sugar and more water is added. On the following day, one adds further water, sugar and flavoring. Although fermented chicha is available, the unfermented type is the most common.

=== Panama ===
In Panama, chicha can simply mean "fruit drink". Unfermented chicha often is called batido, another name for any drink containing a fruit puree. Locally, among the Guna or Gundetule of the San Blas chain of islands "chicha fuerte" refers to the fermented maize and Grandmother Saliva mixture, which chicha is enjoyed in special or Holy days. While chicha fuerte most traditionally refers to chicha made of germinated corn (germination helps to convert starch to sugar), any number of fruits can be fermented into unique, homemade versions of the beverage. In rural areas, chicha fuerte is the refreshment of choice during and after community work parties (juntas), as well as during community dances (tamboritos).

=== Peru ===
Chicha's importance in the social and religious world of Latin America can best be seen by focusing on the drink's central role in ancient Peru. Corn was considered a sacred crop, but Chicha, in particular, was considered very high status. Chicha was consumed in great quantities during and after the work of harvesting, making for a festive mood of singing, dancing, and joking. Chicha was offered to gods and ancestors, much like other fermented beverages around the world were. For example, at the Incan capital of Cuzco, the king poured chicha into a gold bowl at the navel of the universe, an ornamental stone dais with throne and pillar, in the central plaza. The chicha cascaded down this "gullet of the Sun God" to the Temple of Sun, as awestruck spectators watched the high god quaff the precious brew. At most festivals, ordinary people participated in days of prodigious drinking after the main feast, as the Spanish looked on aghast at the drunkenness.

Human sacrifices first had to be rubbed in the dregs of chicha, and then tube-fed with more chicha for days while lying buried alive in tombs. Special sacred places, scattered throughout the empire, and mummies of previous kings and ancestors were ritually bathed in maize flour and presented with chicha offerings, to the accompaniment of dancing and panpipe music. Even today, Peruvians sprinkle some chicha to "mother earth" from the communal cup when they sit down together to drink; the cup then proceeds in the order of each drinker's social status, as an unending succession of toasts are offered.

There are several types of chicha that are drank in Peru in the present day:

- Chicha de jora: brewed with germinated yellow Andean corn. The word Jora in Spanish actually means "sprouted/germinated". The germinated corn then is then boiled, placed in a vessel (usually an earthenware) and let the liquid to ferment for several days. The amount of alcohol is produced by how many days the liquid is left to ferment.
- Chicha Frutillada: Within the chicha de jora, it exists other variations such as "chicha frutillada", a type of chicha de jora that also adds sugar and strawberries as part of the ingredient when brewing. Some vendors do add a bit of beetroot to darken the color a bit. Usually this type of chicha is brewed and consumed during the months of November to January.
- Chicha morada: chicha made with Andean purple corn. This chicha type are not fermented and is used more like a juice, cooked with sugar and other spices and fruits. Some of the common spices used in chicha morada are pineapple, cloves, cinnamon sticks, and lemon/lime.
- Chicha de guiñapo: A variant of the chicha morada that is fermented. This chicha is only found in the eateries (picanterias) in Arequipa. This variant of chicha uses the Arequipa's purple corn variant instead of the more common purple corn found in the markets.

=== Venezuela ===
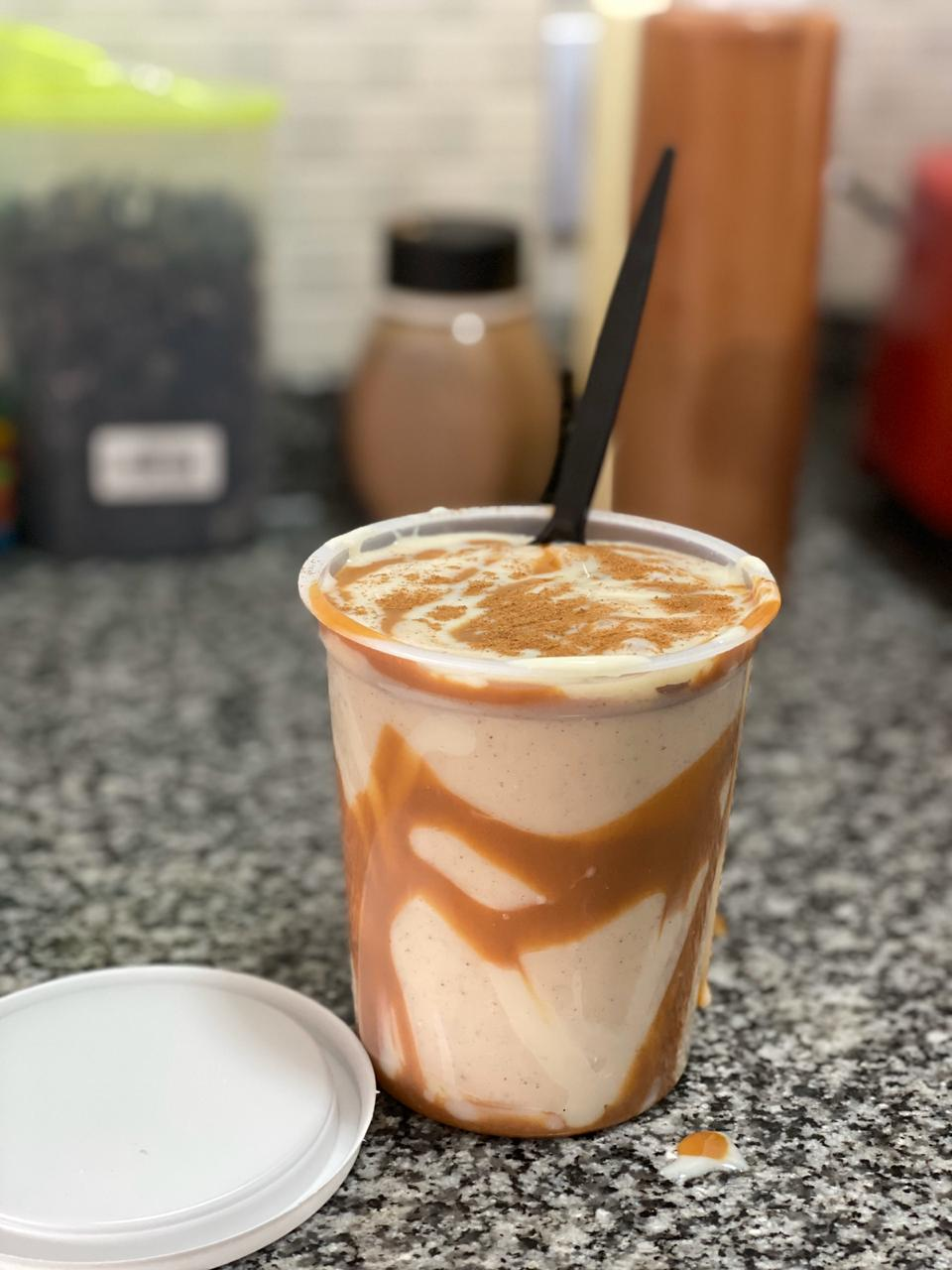
Venezuelan chicha with cinnamon, made from rice

In Venezuela chicha or chicha de arroz is made of boiled rice, milk, sugar; it is generally of white color and has the consistency of eggnog. It is usually served as a sweet, refreshing beverage with ground cinnamon or condensed milk toppings. This chicha de arroz contains no alcohol as it is not fermented. Sometimes it is made with pasta or semolina instead of rice and is commonly called chicha de pasta.

In most large cities, chicha is offered by street vendors, commonly referred to as chicheros; these vendors usually use a flour-like mix and just add water, and generally serve them with chopped ice and a straw and may ask to add cinnamon, chocolate chips or sugared condensed milk on top. It can also be found in commercial presentations just like milk and juices. The Venezuelan Andean regions (such as Mérida) prepare an alternative version, with added fermented pineapple, which has a more liquory taste. This variety is commonly referred to as Chicha Andina and is a typical Christmastime beverage.

== Significance in Inca society ==
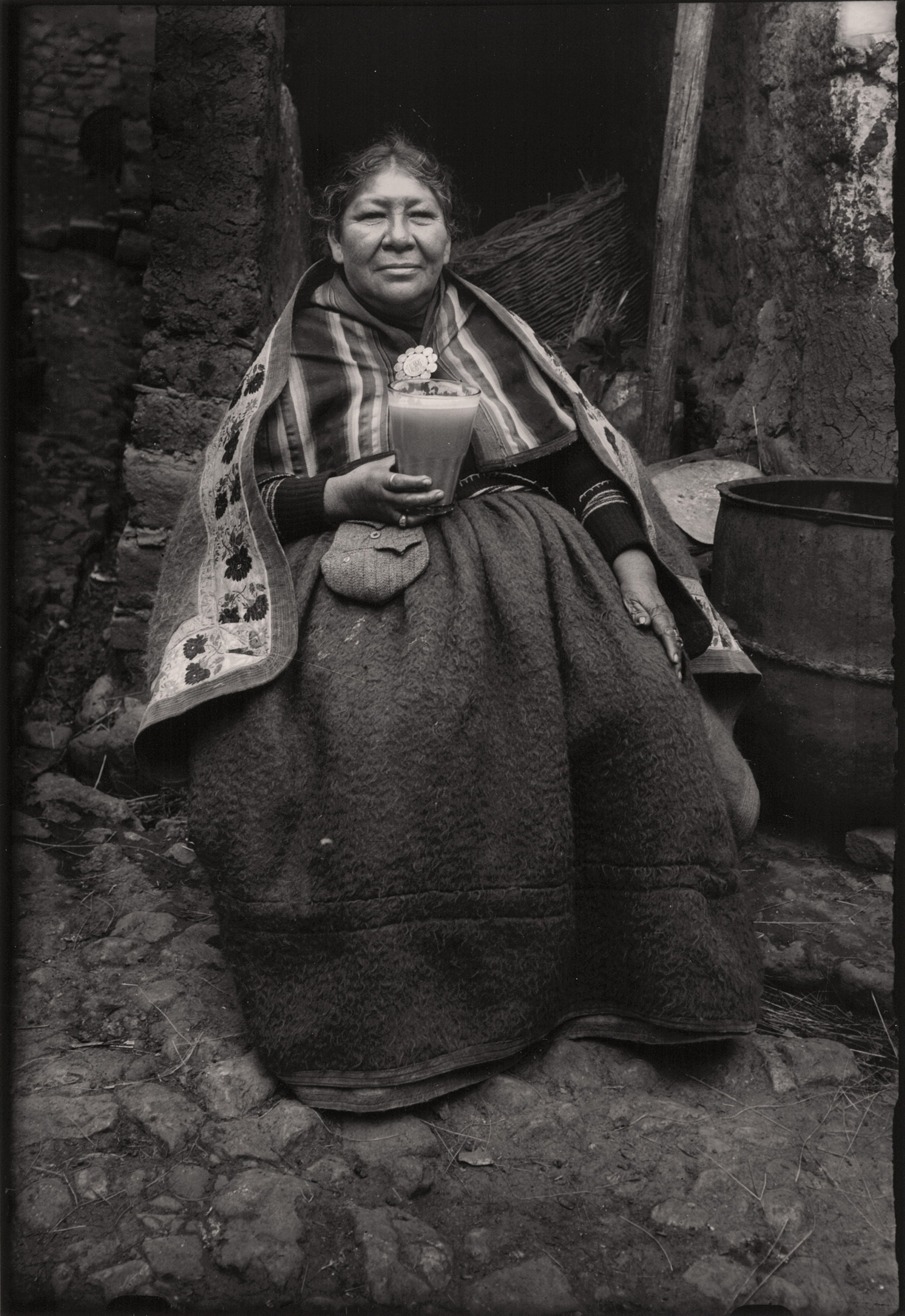
A woman drinking chicha in Cusco, Peru. Photo by Martín Chambi, 1931

=== Identity ===
Chicha use can reveal how people perceive their own cultural identity and express ideas about gender, race, nationality, and community. Chicha use contributes to how people build community and a collective identity for maintaining social networks. It is often consumed in the context of feasts and festivals, which are valuable contexts for strengthening social and cultural connections. The production and consumption of chicha contributes to social organization and can affect social status.

=== Rites of passage ===
Chicha consumption included its use in rites of passage for indigenous peoples such as the Incas. Chicha was important in ceremonies for adolescent boys coming of age, especially for the sons of Inca nobility. Young men would get their adult names in ceremonies using chicha. One thing that these boys did was to go on a pilgrimage to mountains such as Huanacauri that had significant meaning. Boys did this about a month before a ceremony honoring maturation. After the pilgrimage, the boys chewed maize to make the chicha they would drink at the end of the month-long ceremony. One activity was running down the side of a mountain to get a kero of chicha given to them by young women in order to encourage them.

=== Women's role ===
The use of chicha can also be seen when looking at women who lived during the Incas reign before the arrival of the Spanish. Women were important to the community of the Incas. There was a select group of women that would receive formal instruction, these women were the aclla, also known as "Chosen Women". This group of women was extracted from their family-homes and taken to the acllahuasi or "House of the Chosen Women". These women were dedicated to Inca religion, weaving, cooking and chicha-brewing. Much of the chicha they brewed would go to ceremonies, or when the community would get together to worship their god. They started the chicha process by chewing maize to create mushy texture that would be fermented. The product of the acllas was considered sacred because of the women who produced it. This was a special privilege that many women did not have except for the "most attractive women."

=== Perceptions by the Inca royalty ===
The Incas themselves show the importance of chicha. The lords or royalty probably drank chicha from silver and gold cups known as qirus. Also, after defeating an enemy Inca rulers would have heads of the defeated enemy converted into cup to drink chicha from. An example of this could be seen when Atawallpa drank chicha from opposing foes skull. By doing this it showed how superior the Incas themselves were to by leading their army to victory and chicha was at the forefront. After major military victories the Incas would celebrate by drinking chicha. When the Incas and the Spanish conquistadors met, the conquistadors would not understand the significance of chicha. Titu Cusi explains how his uncle, Atahualpa reacted when the intruders did not respect chicha. Kusi says, "The Spaniard, upon receiving the drink in his hand, spilled it which greatly angered my uncle. And after that, the two Spaniards showed my uncle a letter, or book, or something, saying that this was the inscription of God and the King and my uncle, as he felt offended by the spilling of the chicha, took the letter and knocked to the ground saying: I don't know what you have given me. Go on, leave." Another instance like this occurred between Atawallpa and the Spanish, it left with Atawallpa saying, "Since you don't respect me I won't respect you either." This story recorded by Titu Cusi shows the significant relationship the Incas had with chicha. If someone insulted this beverage they would take it personally because it offended their beliefs and community.

=== Economy ===
In the economy of the Incas, there was not an exchange of currencies. Rather, the economy depended on trading products, the exchanging of services, and the Inca distributing items out to the people that work for him. Chicha that was produced by men along the coastline in order to trade or present to their Inca. This differed from the women that were producing the chicha inland because they were doing so for community gathers and other important ceremonies. Relationships were important in the Inca community and good relations with the Inca could allow a family to be provided with supplementary goods that not everyone had access to. The Inca would give chicha to families and to the men that that contributed to mit'a.

In the economy of the Incas it was important that there was a steady flow of chicha, amongst other goods that were important to everyday life. In the fields of the Andes, there was special emphasis where maize would be planted and it was taken seriously where the maize fields would be located. "Agricultural rituals linked the production of maize to the liquid transfer of power in society with chicha." The ability to plant maize showed an important social role someone had amongst their community. Due to the significance of planting maize, the state would probably be in charge of these farms. The significance of drinking chicha together as a community was another important aspect to the way the Incas went about everyday life. It was incorporated into the meals that the Incas ate.

=== Religious purposes ===
The production of chicha was a necessity to all because it was a sacred item to the people. "Among the Incas, corn was a divine gift to humanity, and its consumption as a fermented beverage in political meetings formed a communion between those where drinking and the ancestors, the land, and the entirety of the Inca cosmology." This beverage allowed the people to go back to the story of creation and be reminded of the creator god Wiraqocha. The Incas saw this beverage in sexual way because of the way the earth produced for them. The Incas saw chicha as semen and when dumped onto the Earth they thought that they were feeding the Earth.

== See also ==
- Cauim
- Chicha de jora
- Chicha morada
- List of fermented foods
- List of maize dishes
- List of saliva-fermented beverages
- Pox (drink)
- Pulque
- Punucapa
- Tejuino
- Tesguino
