= List of fermented foods =

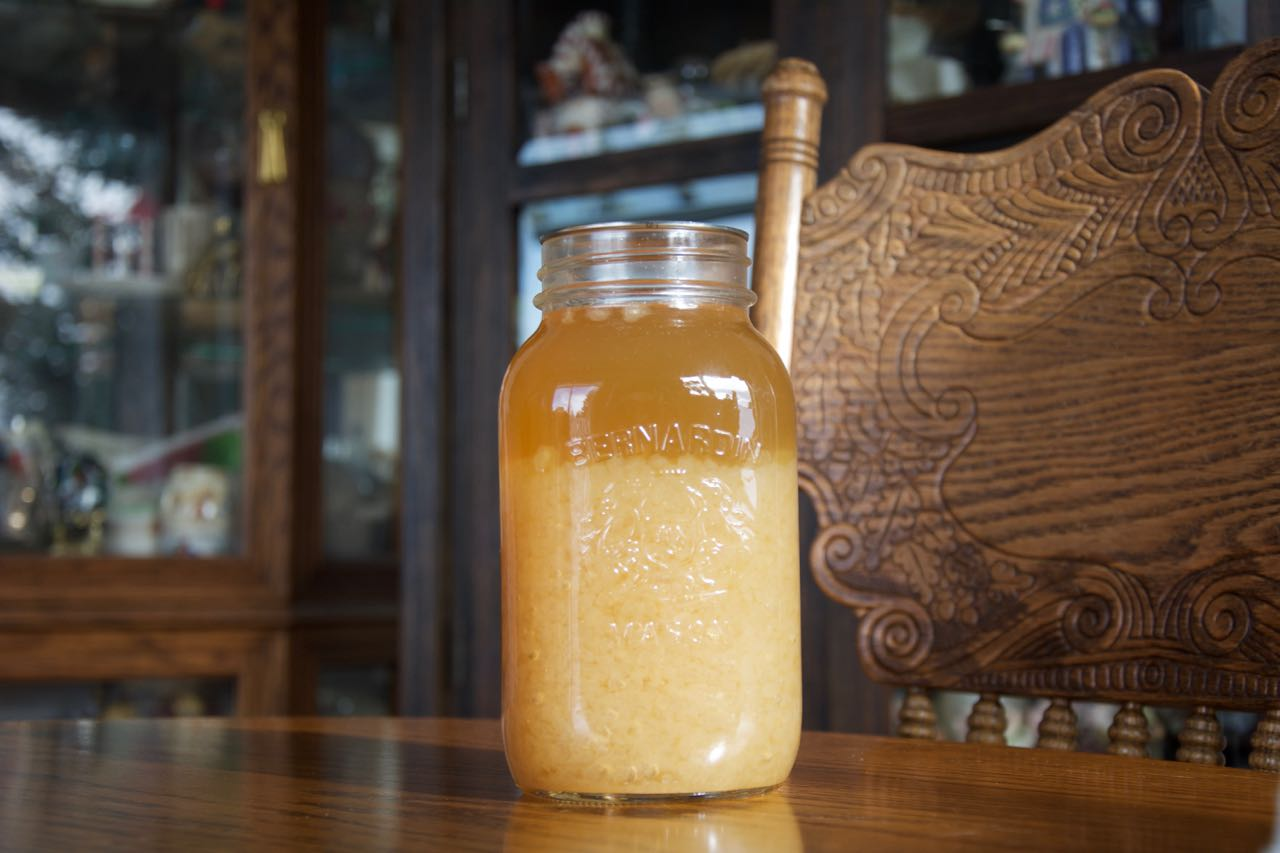
Tibicos water crystals made with Muscovado

This is a list of fermented foods, which are foods produced or preserved by the action of microorganisms. In this context, fermentation typically refers to the fermentation of sugar to alcohol using yeast, but other fermentation processes involve the use of bacteria such as lactobacillus, including the making of foods such as yogurt and sauerkraut. Many fermented foods are mass-produced using industrial fermentation processes. The science of fermentation is known as zymology.

Many pickled or soured foods are fermented as part of the pickling or souring process, but many are simply processed with brine, vinegar, or another acid such as lemon juice.

== Fermented foods ==
=== Fermented beans and seeds ===
Name	Image	Regional or Ethnic Origin		Description
Name	Image	Continent (or comparable)	Country or Ethnicity	Description
Cocoa		North America	Mesoamerica	Cocoa bean fermentation for chocolate, and other cocoa products.
Cheonggukjang		Asia	Korea	A fermented soybean paste used in Korean cuisine that contains both whole and ground soybeans.
Doenjang		Asia	Korea	A thick bean paste that includes fermentation in its preparation.
Doubanjiang		Asia	China	A spicy, salty paste made from fermented broad beans, soybeans, salt, rice, and various spices.
Douchi		Asia	China	A type of fermented and salted black soybean.
Douzhi		Asia	Beijing	This is a fermented dish from Beijing cuisine. It is similar to soy milk, but made from mung beans. It is a by-product of cellophane noodle production. It is generally slightly sour, with an egg-like smell. (Pictured in bowl at bottom left.)
Fermented bean curd		Asia	China	Fermented tofu.
Fermented bean paste		Asia	East and Southeast Asia	A category of fermented foods typically made from ground soybeans, which are indigenous to the cuisines of East and Southeast Asia. In some cases, such as in the production of miso, other varieties of beans such as broad beans may also be used.
lulu jardin		Asia	China	A type of fermented bean curd.
Miso		Asia	Japan	A bean paste that includes fermentation in its preparation.
Nattō		Asia	Japan	Nattō (なっとう or 納豆) is a traditional Japanese food made from soybeans fermented with Bacillus subtilis var. natto. Some eat it as a breakfast food. It is served with soy sauce, karashi mustard and Japanese bunching onion. Nattō may be an acquired taste because of its powerful smell, strong flavor, and slimy texture. In Japan, nattō is most popular in the eastern regions, including Kantō, Tōhoku, and Hokkaido.
Felij		Africa	West Africa	A flavoring made of fermented oil seeds, such as sesame seeds or egusi seeds. The process and product are similar to iru or douchi. Its smell is like cheese, miso, or stinky tofu.
Oncom		Asia	West Java, Indonesia	A traditional staple food closely related to tempeh, usually made from various byproducts of other foods such as tofu. Red and black oncom are made using different varieties of mold.
Pon ye gyi		Asia	Myanmar (Burma)	A fermented bean paste commonly used as a condiment or marinade, traditionally made from horse gram beans, alongside other beans.
Ssamjang		Asia	Korea	A thick, spicy paste used with food wrapped in a leaf in Korean cuisine. The sauce is made of fermented soy beans (doenjang), red chili paste (gochujang), sesame oil, onion, garlic, green onions, and optionally brown sugar.
Stinky tofu (chòu dòufu)		Asia	China, Hong Kong, Taiwan	A variety of fermented tofu.
Tempeh		Asia	Indonesia	A traditional soy product originally from Indonesia that is made by a natural culturing and controlled fermentation process that binds soybeans into a cake form.
Tianmianjiang		Asia	China	A thick, smooth, dark brown or black paste with either a mild, savory or sweet flavor, also known as sweet bean sauce, sweet flour sauce or sweet wheat paste. Peking duck and jajangmyeon (black bean noodles) are two popular dishes that feature the sauce.
Tương		Asia	Vietnam	Originally, the term tương referred to a salty paste made from fermented soybeans. The word tương can also be used to refer to other condiments, such as tương cà (tomato sauce), tương xí muội (plum sauce) or tương ớt (chilli sauce). In southern Vietnam, nước tương refers to soy sauce while Northern Vietnam calls it xì dầu.
Tungrymbai		Asia	Meghalaya, India	A fermented soybean food. Tungrymbai is usually prepared by crushing the fermented beans until it almost becomes a paste, and frying in mustard oil with onion-ginger-garlic paste, black sesame seed paste, aromatics and pork.
Yellow soybean paste (huáng jiàng)		Asia	Northern China	A fermented paste made from yellow soybeans, salt, and water.

=== Fermented cheeses ===
Most cheeses are fermented as part of their production.

Name	Image	Regional or Ethnic Origin		Description
Name	Image	Continent (or comparable)	Country or Ethnicity	Description
Ambra di Talamello		Europe	Italy	
Blue cheese				
Limburger cheese		Europe	Belgium	
Shanklish		Asia	Levant	
Tvorog		Europe	Western Russia	A white cheese originating in Russia

=== Fermented condiments ===
Name	Image	Regional or Ethnic Origin		Description
Name	Image	Continent (or comparable)	Country or Ethnicity	Description
Bagoong		Asia	Philippines	A Philippine condiment made of partially or completely fermented fish or shrimp and salt. The fermentation process also results in fish sauce (known as patis).
Bosou		Asia	Sabah, Malaysia	A Kadazan-Dusun condiment produced through the process of preserving either vegetables, freshwater fish, or meat mixed with salt, white rice, and pangi fruit (Pangium edule) as the main preservative.
Dayok		Asia	Philippines	A type of fish sauce originating from the Visayas and Mindanao islands of the Philippines made from fermented yellowfin tuna entrails.
Fish sauce		Asia	East and Southeast Asia	A liquid condiment made from fish or krill that have been coated in salt and fermented for up to two years. It is used as a staple seasoning in East Asian cuisine and Southeast Asian cuisine. Some garum-related fish sauces have been used in the West since the Roman times.
Ganjang		Asia	Korea	A kind of Korean soy sauce made from fermented soybeans. Ganjang is a uniquely Korean condiment.
Garum		Europe	Ancient Rome	Garum was a fish sauce made from the fermentation of fish entrails, used as a condiment in the cuisines of ancient Greece, Rome, and Byzantium. It is believed to have resembled the fermented anchovy sauce colatura di alici still produced today in Campania, Italy.
Gochujang		Asia	Korea	A savory, sweet, and spicy fermented condiment popular in Korean cooking. It is made from gochu-garu (chili powder), glutinous rice, meju (fermented soybean) powder, yeotgireum (barley malt powder), and salt.
Iru		Africa	Nigeria	A type of fermented and processed locust beans (Parkia biglobosa) used as a condiment in cooking, very popular among the Yoruba people and Edo people of Nigeria.
Murri (condiment)		Afro-Eurasia	Middle East	A type of fermented condiment made with barley flour, comparable to soy sauce.
Soy sauce		Asia	Korea, Japan, China, Taiwan, Philippines, Indonesia	Pictured is traditional Korean soy sauce.
Sumbala		Africa	West Africa	A fermented seed condiment, traditionally prepared from néré (Parkia biglobosa) seeds, but also from other kinds of seeds, such as those of Prosopis africana, and, nowadays, soybeans. It is comparable to miso paste.
Vinegar		Asia	Babylonia, Mesopotamia	An aqueous solution of acetic acid and trace compounds that may include flavorings. Usually, the acetic acid is produced by a double fermentation, converting simple sugars to ethanol using yeast, and ethanol to acetic acid by acetic acid bacteria. It is now mainly used in the culinary arts as a flavorful, acidic cooking ingredient, or in pickling. Various types of vinegar are also used as condiments or garnishes, including balsamic vinegar and malt vinegar. As the most easily manufactured mild acid, it has a wide variety of industrial and domestic uses, including use as a household cleaner.
Worcestershire sauce		Europe	Worcestershire, England	A fermented liquid condiment named after the city of Worcester in Worcestershire, England. It is frequently used to augment food and drink recipes, and used directly as a condiment on steaks, hamburgers, and other finished dishes.
Yongfeng chili sauce		Asia	Yongfeng, Shuangfeng County, Loudi city, Hunan province, China	Fermented hot sauce from Hunan.

=== Fermented creams and yogurts ===
Name	Image	Regional or Ethnic Origin		Description
Name	Image	Continent (or comparable)	Country or Ethnicity	Description
Amasi		Africa	South Africa	A type of fermented milk that tastes like cottage cheese or plain yogurt.
Crème fraîche		Europe	France	A soured cream containing 30–45% butterfat and having a pH of around 4.5. It is soured with bacterial culture, but is less sour than U.S.-style sour cream, and has a lower viscosity and a higher fat content.
Fermented milk products		Worldwide	Worldwide	Also known as cultured dairy foods, cultured dairy products, or cultured milk products, fermented milk products are dairy foods that have been fermented with lactic acid bacteria such as Lactobacillus, Lactococcus, and Leuconostoc.
Filmjölk		Europe	Nordic countries	A mesophilic fermented milk product that is made by fermenting cow's milk with a variety of bacteria from the species Lactococcus lactis and Leuconostoc mesenteroides.
Kaymak		Asia	Central Asia	A fermented, creamy dairy food similar to clotted cream, made from the milk of water buffalo, cows, sheep, or goats.
Matzoon		Eurasia	Armenia, Georgia	A fermented milk product of Armenian origin.
Mursik		Africa	Kenya	A traditional fermented milk variant of the Kalenjin people of Kenya. It can be made from cow or goat milk and is fermented in a specially made calabash gourd locally known as a sotet. The gourd is lined with soot from specific trees which add flavor to the fermented milk.
Skyr		Europe	Iceland	A cultured dairy product, with the consistency of strained yogurt, but a milder flavor. Skyr can be classified as a fresh sour milk cheese (similar to curd cheese eaten in Estonia, Germany and Russia), but is consumed like a yogurt.
Smetana, Smântână		Europe	Central and Eastern Europe	A type of sour cream, produced by souring heavy cream. It is similar to crème fraîche.
Sour cream				Obtained by fermenting a regular cream with certain kinds of lactic acid bacteria. The bacterial culture, which is introduced either deliberately or naturally, sours and thickens the cream. Pictured is Smetana.
Soured milk				Soured milk denotes a range of food products produced by the acidification of milk. Soured milk that is produced by bacterial fermentation is more specifically called fermented milk or cultured milk. Soured milk that is produced by the addition of an acid, with or without the addition of microbial organisms, is more specifically called acidified milk.
Strained yogurt				Strained yogurt, Greek yogurt, yogurt cheese, sack yogurt, or kerned yogurt is yogurt that has been strained to remove most of its whey, resulting in a thicker consistency than normal unstrained yogurt, while still preserving the distinctive sour taste of yogurt.
Tarhana		Afro-Eurasia	Middle East, Southeast Europe	A dried food ingredient, based on a fermented mixture of grain and yogurt or fermented milk. It is usually made into a thick soup with water, stock, or milk. Tarhana is very similar to some kinds of kashk.
Viili		Nordic countries	Nordic countries	A fermented milk product. Viili is similar to yoghurt or kefir, but when left unmixed, its texture is malleable, or "long".
Yogurt		Asia	Unknown; thought to be ancient Mesopotamia	A fermented milk product produced by the bacterial fermentation of milk

=== Fermented grains and grain-based foods ===
Name	Image	Regional or Ethnic Origin		Description
Name	Image	Continent (or comparable)	Country or Ethnicity	Description
Dosa (food)		Asia	South India	Thin, crispy pancake made from a fermented rice and lentil batter.
Idli		Asia	South India	Steamed, fluffy cakes made from fermented rice and black gram batter.
Appam		Asia	South India	Bowl-shaped fermented rice pancakes with a soft center and crisp edges.
Puto		Asia	Philippines	Lightly sweet steamed rice cakes made from fermented batter.
Tapai		Asia	Indonesia / Malaysia	Sweet, slightly alcoholic fermented rice or cassava.
Jiuniang		Asia	China	Sweet, mildly alcoholic fermented glutinous rice in a soupy form.
Injera		Africa	Ethiopia	Spongy, sour flatbread made from fermented teff batter.
Ogi		Africa	West Africa	Smooth, sour porridge made from fermented maize, sorghum, or millet.
Koko (millet porridge)		Africa	Ghana	Thin, spiced fermented millet porridge commonly eaten for breakfast.
Kisra		Africa	Sudan	Thin fermented flatbread made from sorghum flour.
Sourdough		Europe	Various	Bread made using naturally occurring wild yeast and lactic acid bacteria.

=== Fermented fruits and vegetables ===
Name	Image	Regional or Ethnic Origin		Description
Name	Image	Continent (or comparable)	Country or Ethnicity	Description
Atchara		Asia	Philippines	A pickle made from grated unripe papaya that is popular in the Philippines. It is often served as a side dish for fried or grilled foods such as pork barbecue.
Bambangan		Asia	Sabah, Malaysia	A Kadazan-Dusun condiment produced through the process of preserving Mangifera pajang (Bornean wild mango) with salt and bird's eye chilli.
Burong mangga		Asia	Philippines	Made by mixing sugar, salt, and water to mangoes that have previously been salted.
Chinese pickles		Asia	China	Various vegetables or fruits that have been fermented by pickling with salt and brine or marinated in mixtures based on soy sauce or savory bean pastes.
Curtido		North America (Central America)	El Salvador	A type of lightly fermented cabbage relish. It is typical in Salvadoran cuisine and that of other Central American countries, and is usually made with cabbage, onions, carrots, and sometimes lime juice.
Kapusta kiszona duszona		Europe	Poland	A Polish dish of braised or stewed sauerkraut or cabbage, with bacon, mushroom and onion or garlic. It is seasoned with salt, pepper and sometimes bay leaf, caraway seeds, sugar, paprika and apples.
Garri		Africa	West Africa	A popular West African food made from cassava tubers.
Gundruk		Asia	Nepal	Gundruk is made by fermenting leaves of vegetables of Brassica family.
Kawal		Africa	Sudan	Fermented leaves of Cassia obtusifolia. Fermentation removes the toxicity of the raw plant and allows it to be used as a protein source. It is also used as a condiment in its powdered form.
Kimchi		Asia	Korea	Fermented cabbage or radish product.
Masi, mahi		Oceania	Polynesia	Baked meal of knead fermented breadfruit.
Meigan cai		Asia	China	A fermented brassica product.
Mohnyin tjin		Asia	Myanmar	A popular Burmese cuisine fermented food dish of vegetables preserved in rice wine and various seasonings, similar to Korean kimchi.
Nata de coco		Asia	Philippines	A jelly-like dessert made from fermented coconut water.
Nata de piña		Asia	Philippines	A jelly-like dessert made from fermented pineapple juice.
Pickles		Asia	Ancient Mesopotamia	Pickling is the process of preserving or extending the shelf life of food by either anaerobic fermentation in brine or immersion in vinegar. The pickling procedure typically affects the food's texture and flavor. The resulting food is called a pickle, or, to prevent ambiguity, prefaced with pickled. Foods that are pickled include vegetables, fruits, meats, fish, dairy and eggs.
Poi		Oceania	Polynesia	A traditional staple food paste, with consistency ranging from highly viscous to liquid, made from starchy vegetables, usually breadfruit, taro or plantain.
Portuguese ground red pepper (Pimenta Moida) a.k.a. Massa de pimentão		Europe	Portugal. Salt substitute staple in the Azores. Base for many Portuguese dishes.	Fermented ground peppers with olive oil and seasonings: Pepper heat range typically from 0-1000 Scoville.
Sauerkraut		Europe	Germany	Finely cut cabbage that has been fermented by various lactic acid bacteria, including Leuconostoc, Lactobacillus, and Pediococcus. It has a long shelf life and a distinctive sour flavor, both of which result from the lactic acid that forms when the bacteria ferment the sugars in the cabbage.
Sinki		Asia	Nepal	A preserved fermented vegetable, prepared from radish tap roots.
Sour cabbage		Europe	Eastern Europe; Balkans	Vegetable preserve similar to sauerkraut, with the difference that it is prepared through the lacto-fermentation of whole heads of cabbage (Brassica Oleracea var.capitata), not separate leaves or grated mass.
Suan cai		Asia	China	Pickled Chinese cabbage (napa cabbage) or Chinese mustard, used for a variety of purposes.
Tempoyak		Asia	Malaysia and Indonesia	Fermented durian.
Tianjin preserved vegetable (tung tsai)		Asia	China	A preserved vegetable consisting of finely chopped Tianjin cabbage (箭杆菜; a variety of Chinese cabbage with an elongated shape) and salt. Garlic is added during preservation, if the cabbage is not to be consumed by certain Chinese Buddhist sects.
Tsukemono		Asia	Japan	Japanese preserved vegetables (usually pickled in salt, brine, or a bed of rice bran). They are served with rice as an okazu (side dish), with drinks as an otsumami (snack), as an accompaniment to or garnish for meals, and as a course in the kaiseki portion of a Japanese tea ceremony.
Zha cai		Asia	Chongqing, China	A type of pickled mustard plant stem, made from the knobby, fist-sized, swollen green stem of Brassica juncea, subspecies tsatsai. The stem is first salted, pressed, and dried before being rubbed with hot red chili paste and allowed to ferment in an earthenware jar.

=== Fermented meat and seafood ===
Name	Image	Regional or Ethnic Origin		Description
Name	Image	Continent (or comparable)	Country or Ethnicity	Description
Bagoong monamon		Asia	Philippines	Prepared by fermenting salted anchovies.
Bagoong terong		Asia	Philippines	Made by salting and fermenting the bonnetmouth fish.
Burong isda		Asia	Philippines	Raw fish, fermented in red rice and salt for up to one week. Similar to Japanese narezushi.
Burong talangka		Asia	Philippines	Made by mixing crablets, and salt and left in a jar to ferment thoroughly. It can be eaten after 2–5 days. In the some communities, calamansi, chili, dayap, and/or soy sauce is/are added to enhance the flavor while fermentation is occurring.
Cincalok		Asia	Malaysia	Fermented shrimp dish.
Cod liver oil (Traditional preparation method)		Atlantic Ocean	North Atlantic-adjacent nations	Cod liver oil was traditionally manufactured by filling a wooden barrel with fresh cod livers and seawater and allowing the mixture to ferment for up to a year before removing the oil.
Fermented fish		Worldwide	Worldwide	A traditional preparation of fish. Before refrigeration, canning, and other modern preservation techniques became available, fermenting was an important preservation method.
Gejang		Asia	Korea	Gejang (게장) or gejeot (게젓) is made by marinating fresh raw crabs either in ganjang (soy sauce) or in a sauce based on chili pepper powder.
Hákarl		Europe	Iceland	Made by fermenting shark meat, then hanging it to dry. Pictured is hákarl hanging to dry in Iceland.
Hongeohoe		Asia	Korea	A type of fermented fish dish from Korea's Jeolla province. Hongeo-hoe is made from skate and emits a very strong, characteristic ammonia-like odor.
Igunaq		Arctic	North American Arctic, Northeast Asia	A method of preparing meat, particularly walrus and other marine mammals. Meat and fat caught in the summer is buried in the ground as steaks, which then ferment over autumn and freeze over winter, ready for consumption the next year.
Jeotgal		Asia	Korea	A category of salted preserved dishes made with seafood such as shrimps, oysters, clams, fish, and roe. Depending on the ingredients, jeotgal can range from flabby, solid pieces to clear, broth-like liquid.
Jogijeot		Asia	Korea	A variety of jeotgal (salted seafood), made with yellow croakers.
Katsuobushi		Asia	Japan	Simmered, smoked and fermented skipjack tuna (Katsuwonus pelamis, sometimes referred to as bonito). It is also known as bonito flakes.
Kiviak		North America	Greenland	Kiviak or kiviaq is a traditional wintertime Inuit food made of auks, a type of seabird, preserved in a seal skin.
Kusaya		Asia	Japan	A traditional salted and fermented fish dish originating in the Izu Islands, and often eaten with sake, shōchū, or a local drink called Shima Jiman.
Myeolchijeot		Asia	Korea	A variety of jeotgal (salted seafood), made by salting and fermenting anchovies.
Nem chua		Asia	Vietnam	Nem chua is a Vietnamese fermented pork dish, usually rolled or cut in bite sizes. The meat is sweet, sour, salty and spicy. It is often served with bird's eye chili, garlic and Vietnamese coriander.
Ngapi		Asia	Myanmar	A pungent paste made of either fish or shrimp, usually made by fermenting fish or shrimp that is salted and ground then sundried.
Ni'owuru		Asia	Indonesia	Fermented pork dish from Nias Island of the coast of Sumatra
Rakfisk		Europe	Norway	A fish dish made from trout or char, salted and autolyzed for two to three months (or even up to a year), then eaten without cooking.
Saeujeot		Asia	Korea	A salted and fermented food made with small shrimp. Saeujeot is a variety of jeotgal.
Salami		Europe	Italy	A cured sausage consisting of fermented and air-dried meat, typically pork, popular under various names across Europe.
Shark meat		Worldwide	Eastern Africa; Iceland; Yemen; Japan; Sri Lanka; India; Australia; Canada; Mexico; Brazil	Shark meat is sometimes fermented.
Shiokara		Asia	Japan	A food made from various marine animals that consists of small pieces of meat in a brown viscous paste of the animal's heavily salted, fermented viscera.
Shrimp paste (Belacan)		Asia	Southeast Asia, China	Fermented shrimp paste.
Siraw		Asia	Taiwan	A traditional fermented pork dish of the Amis people, one of the Taiwanese indigenous peoples. It is made primarily from pork and salt through a fermentation process and has historically been used both as a preserved food and as a ceremonial dish during Harvest Festivals.
Som moo		Asia	Thailand	A fermented pork sausage with a sour flavor, often eaten in raw form after the fermentation process has occurred.
Surströmming		Europe	Sweden	A lightly-salted fermented Baltic Sea herring.
Taba ng Talangka, aligi		Asia	Philippines	The crab roe and meat of a sack of crablets are carefully taken out and preserved in a single jar using sea salt. Traditionally, the number of female (V-lined underbelly) and 'gay' crabs (D-lined underbelly) should always have more weight than the male crabs (T-lined underbelly). Taba ng talangaka is usually used as a condiment to enhance the flavor of rice and other seafood.

== Fermented drinks and beverages ==
This is a list of fermented drinks. Although many fermented drinks are alcoholic beverages, not all fermented drinks are alcoholic.

Name	Image	Regional or Ethnic Origin		Description
Name	Image	Continent (or comparable)	Country or Ethnicity	Description
Acidophiline		Europe	Russia; Ukraine	Fermented milk product with Lactobacillus acidophilus bacteria.
Amazake		Asia	Japan	A traditional sweet, low- or non-alcohol (depending on recipes) Japanese drink made from fermented rice.
Ayran		Eurasia	Middle East	A cold yogurt beverage mixed with salt. In addition to Turkey, where it is considered a national drink, ayran is found in Iran (there called doogh), Afghanistan, Armenia (here called tan), Azerbaijan, the Balkans, Kazakhstan, Kyrgyzstan, Lebanon, Syria and across the Caucasus. Its primary ingredients are water and yogurt.
Beer		Afro-Eurasia	Iran, Middle East	A traditional alcoholic (depending on recipes) beverage made from grains and hops.
Blaand		Europe	Northwestern Scandinavia; Scotland	A fermented milk product made from whey with a very low alcohol content.
Borș (bran)		Europe	Romania	Water in which wheat or barley bran, sometimes sugar beet, or a slice of bread have fermented.
Boza		Europe	Middle East; Balkans;Central Asia; Caucasus; North Africa; Asia Minor	A traditional fermented grain drink with alcohol found in many countries.
Buttermilk		Eurasia		A fermented dairy drink.
Calpis		Asia	Japan	An uncarbonated soft drink manufactured by Calpis Co., Ltd. that is produced using lactic acid fermentation.
Chass		Asia	India	The word used for buttermilk in Rajasthani and Gujarati. Chass is the traditional Gujarati beverage from Gujarat, India.
Chicha		Americas (Latin America)	Andes, Amazonia	In South America and Central America, chicha is a fermented or non-fermented beverage usually derived from maize. Chicha includes corn beer known as chicha de jora and non-alcoholic beverages such as chicha morada.
Doogh		Asia	Iran	A savory yogurt-based beverage similar to Turkish ayran.
Kanji (drink)		Asia	India	A fermented drink made with carrots and/or beetroots.
Kefir		Europe (Eastern Europe)	North Caucasus	A fermented milk drink, similar to a thin yogurt or ayran, that is made from kefir grains, a specific type of mesophilic symbiotic culture.
Kombucha		Asia	China	A fermented, lightly effervescent, sweetened black or green tea drink commonly consumed for its purported health benefits.
Kumis		Asia	Central Asia	Fermented mare's milk product.
Kvass		Europe (Eastern Europe)	Slavs	Fermented low-alcohol beverage based on rye bread.
Lassi		Asia	India	Yogurt drink.
Leben		Asia	Levant	A buttermilk-type drink.
Mageu		Africa	Southern Africa	A fermented maize-based drink.
Mursik		Africa	Kenya	A traditional fermented milk.
Nai lao		Asia	China	Nailao, also known as Beijing yogurt (北京酸奶; Běijīng suānnǎi), is a traditional fermented milk drink that is popularly consumed throughout China. The word suānnǎi means "acid milk".
Podpiwek		Europe	Poland; Cropos, Lithuania	Soft drink usually made from grain coffee, hops, yeast, water and sugar, which undergo fermentation.
Pulque		North America	Mexico	An ancient drink possibly created by the Olmecs or Toltecs of South-Central Mexico. It is made from the fermented sap of the Agave Americana plant and appears very similar to milk.
Rejuvelac				A fermented drink made from sprouted grains or pseudocereals. Similar to borș. Also used in making vegan cheeses and vegan yogurt.
Rượu nếp		Asia	Northern Vietnam	A rice wine made from glutinous rice that has been fermented with the aid of yeast and steamed in a banana leaf.
Ryazhenka		Europe (Eastern Europe)	Ukraine	A traditional fermented milk product in Ukraine and Russia, made from baked milk by lactic acid fermentation.
Şalgam		Eurasia	Turkey	Şalgam is a popular beverage from southern Turkey's cities of Adana and Mersin. It is made with the juice of red carrot pickles, salted, spiced, and flavoured with aromatic turnip (çelem) fermented in barrels with the addition of ground bulgur.
Tejuino		North America	Nayarit, Mexico	A cold beverage made from fermented corn, usually corn dough, the same kind used for tortillas and tamales.
Tepache		North America	Central Mexico	A nonalcoholic fermented beverage made from the peel and the rind of pineapples, and sweetened either with piloncillo or brown sugar, seasoned with powdered cinnamon, and served cold.
Tesgüino		North America	Central Mexico	An artisanal corn beer produced by several Uto-Aztec people, from maize.
Tibicos (water kefir)		Worldwide	Unknown	A traditional fermented drink made with water and a symbiotic culture of bacteria and yeasts (SCOBY).
Wine		Europe	Caucasus	An alcoholic drink typically made from fermented grapes. Wines not made from grapes involve fermentation of other crops including rice wine and other fruit wines such as plum, cherry, pomegranate, currant and elderberry.
Žinčica		Europe (Eastern Europe)	Žinčica (in Slovakia), Žinčice (in the Czech Republic), Żentyca (in Poland)	A drink made of sheep milk whey as a by-product in the process of making bryndza cheese.
Burukutu		Africa (West Africa)	Nigeria	A fermented alcoholic beverage, brewed from the grains of Guinea corn (Sorghum bicolor) and millet (Pennisetum glaucum). It is produced in tropical African countries such as Nigeria, Togo, Kenya, Ethiopia, and Burundi as one of the major traditional and local alcoholic drinks

== See also ==
- Fermentation (wine)
- Food microbiology
- List of fermented soy products
- List of fish sauces
- List of pickled foods
- Fermented milk products
