= Frutillada =

Peruvian drink

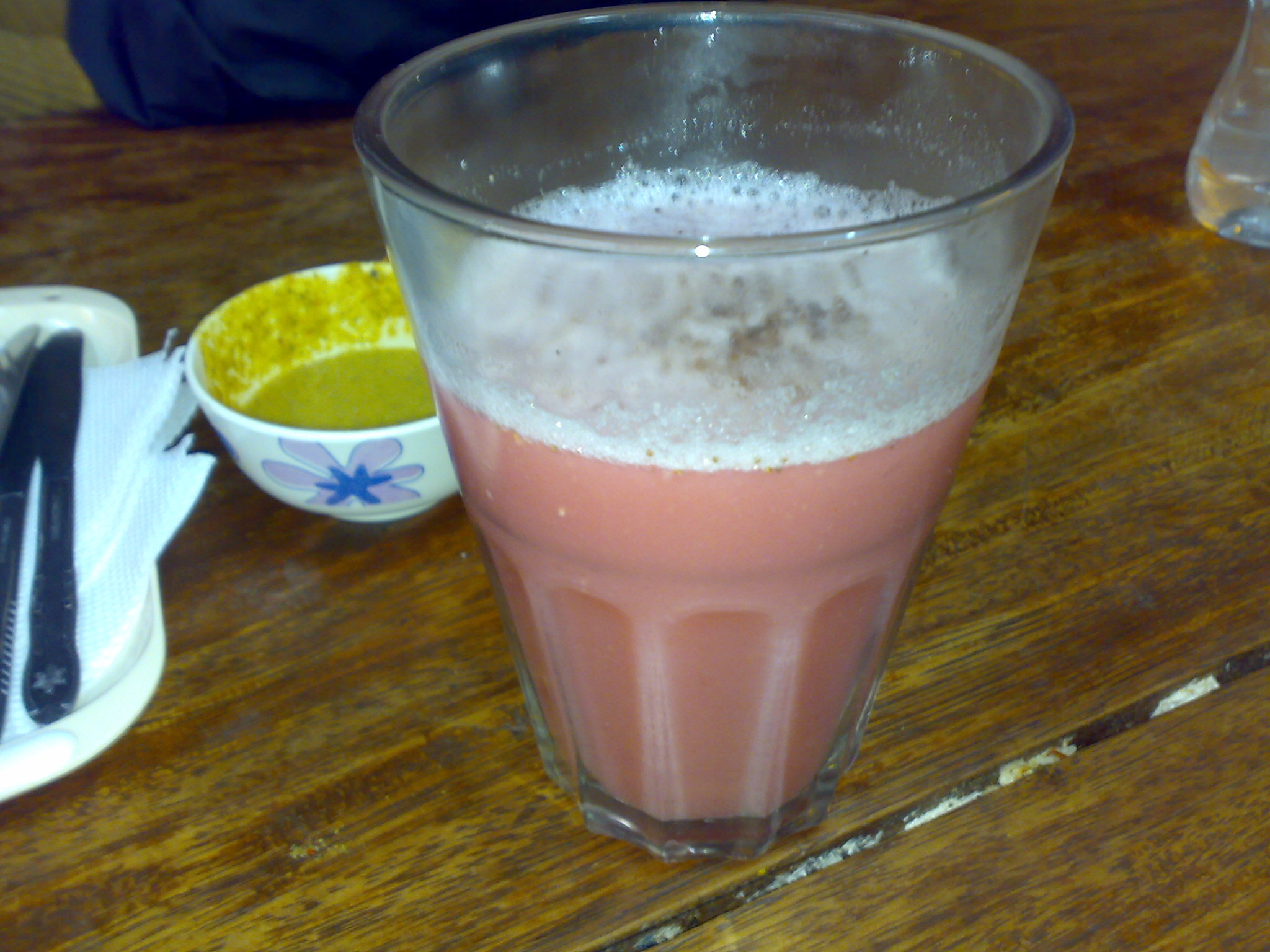

Frutillada is a popular drink in Cusco, Peru, and is generally consumed between the months of November and January.

The drink is made from chicha de jora and frutilla. It is mixed with local strawberry, typically collected in the Sacred Valley. The places where frutillada is sold are called chicherías. The chicherías that sell frutillada are identified with red banners.

The custom of using strawberries has been lost, being replaced by vegetable coloring (based on beet or ayrampo) and other ingredients that try to resemble the original flavor.
