= Corn beer =

Beer style made from corn

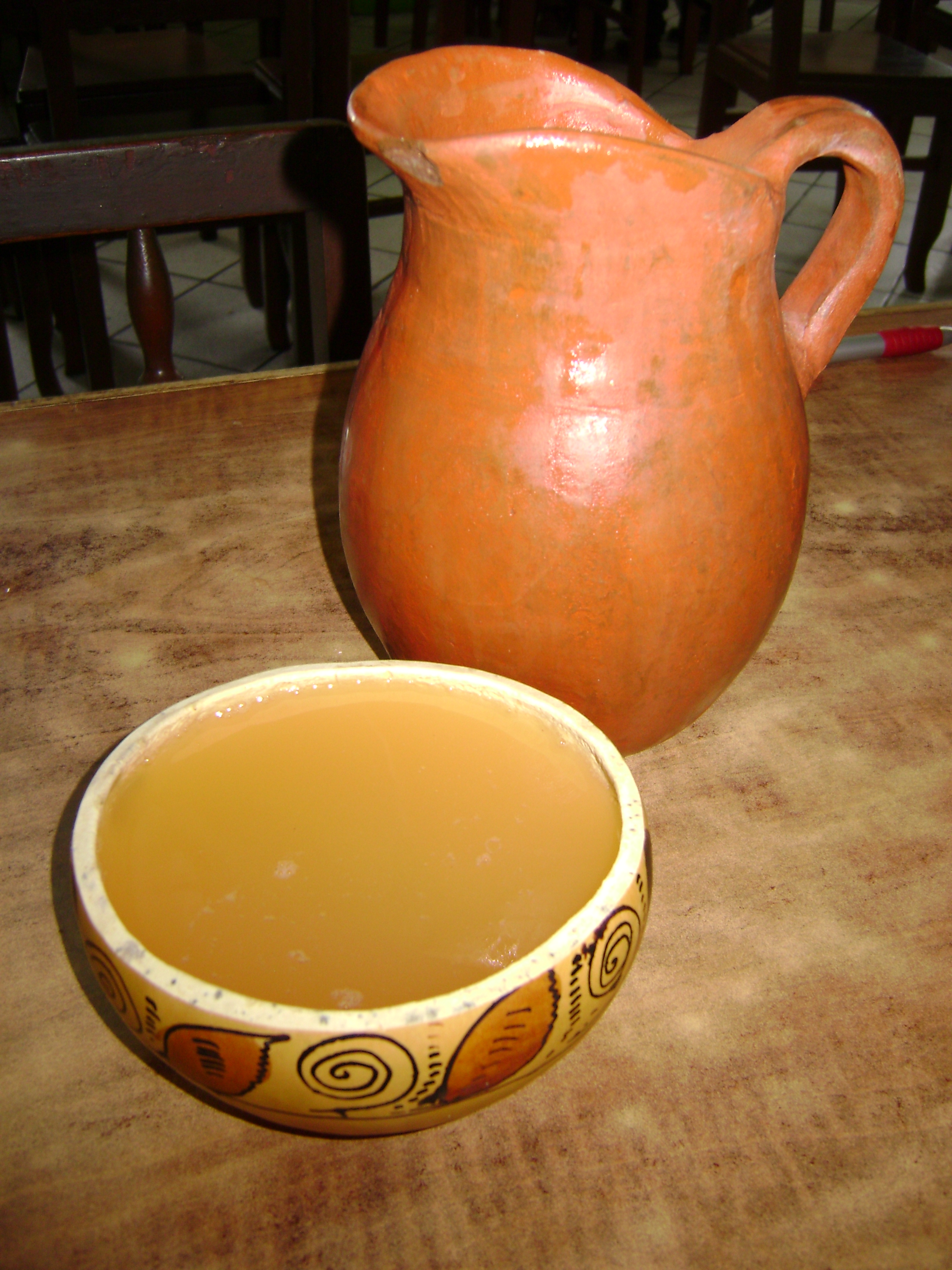
- Chicha served in a vessel known as a poto
- Origin: Catacaos, Peru
- Ingredients: corn

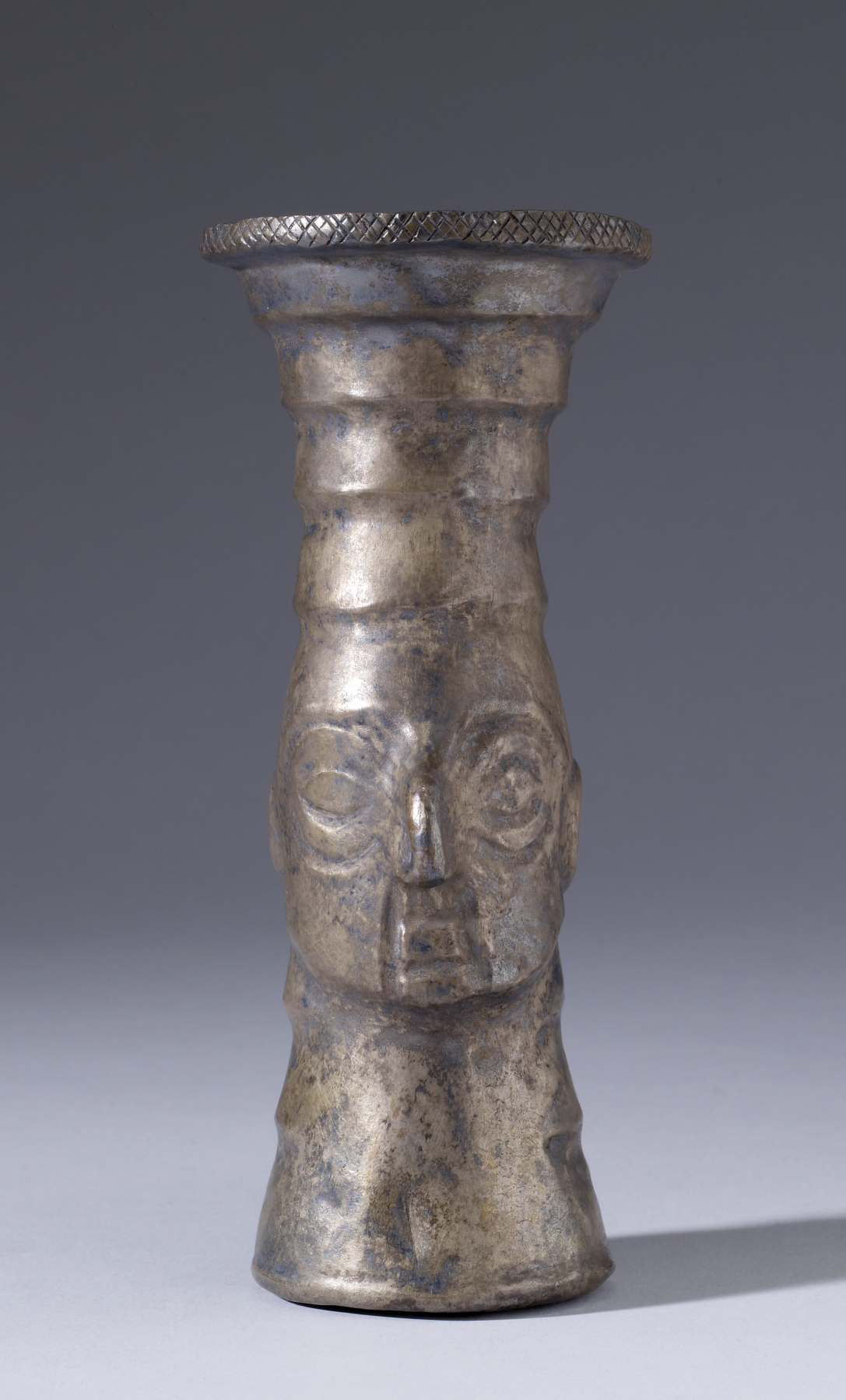
A repoussé silver Chimú kero beaker from Peru that may have been used in drinking rituals with corn beer

Corn beer is a beer style made from corn (maize). The drink is a traditional beverage in various cuisines. Chicha, the best-known corn beer, is widespread in the Andes and local varieties of corn beer exist elsewhere.

== History ==
Corn beer in the Andes has pre-Incan origins. There is archaeological evidence that elite women were responsible for brewing in the Wari culture (600 to 1000 AD).

In 1796, John Boston created a corn beer, the first fermented alcohol beverage commercially produced in Sydney, Australia.

A recipe for corn beer appears in Resources of the Southern Fields and Forests, Medical, Economical, and Agricultural (1863) by Francis Peyre Porcher.

Italian beers Peroni and Nastro Azzuro are made from maize and barley malt. KEO beer from Cyprus is also made with maize, giving a characteristically bitter taste.

== Varieties ==
Chicha is popular in Peru and is served in Arequipa's picanterías.

Tesguino is a corn beer made by the Tarahumara people of the Sierra Madre Occidental in Mexico. It is brewed for local celebrations related to Holy Week. For the Tarahumara, the beer is an elixir for healing and a barter item and is considered a sacred beverage.

Umqombothi is the Xhosa language word for a corn beer made in South Africa from maize (corn), maize malt, sorghum malt, yeast and water.

== See also ==
- Corn whiskey
- Tiswin
- Pozol
- Pox
- List of maize dishes
