= Tiswin =

Corn brew from the Sonoran Desert

- Origin: Sonoran Desert
- Ingredients: corn

Tiswin (known as tesgüino and tejuino in Mexico) is an alcoholic beverage brewed from corn. Tiswin is also the sacred saguaro wine of the Tohono O'odham, a group of aboriginal Americans who reside primarily in the Sonoran Desert of the southeastern Arizona and northwest Mexico. The saguaro, the largest cactus in the world, is in many respects the sacred tree of the Tohono O'odham. From the fruit of the saguaro they make a sacred fermentation called tiswin or sometimes nawai.

== Preparation ==
The old Apache recipe for making tiswin called for soaking the kernels of maize (Zea mays subsp. mays) until they would sprout and reach a size of 1/2-inch, at which time they are removed from the water and ground into a pulp-like mash. They are then boiled (for several hours) in hot water and strained. The resulting mash was then sweetened with either mesquite flour or saguaro syrup, and allowed to ferment in an earthenware brewing jar that was never washed in order to retain the organisms' efficacy needed for fermentation. The finished product had to be drunk within a few hours after it was prepared, or the alcohol would become acetic, making it taste sour.

The Native American Indians of New Mexico preserved a different practice when making tiswin (which they called tesquino). There, they would take 10 pounds of maize which they would roast in an oven until light-brown. After roasting, the corn would then be coarsely ground and put inside a large, earthenware crock, where 4 gallons of water were added. To this, 8 pre-packaged cones of piloncillo (whole cane sugar) were added, along with 6 cinnamon sticks and 3 orange peels for flavoring. The brew was allowed to sit 4 or 5 days, in places where the weather was warm, or longer in places where there was cold weather. Afterwards, the liquid was strained and served.

An alternative Native American recipe, made by the Tohono Oʼodham, was to take the fruit of the saguaro cactus in June, and to spread the fruit on a thatch in a tree, so as to allow it to dry. The cactus fruit was then taken up and boiled in water and then strained through a mat of grass or branches to remove the seeds. The juice was boiled down to a syrup and placed hot in an earthenware vessel (olla), the top of which vessel then covered and tied with a cloth followed by sealing with a bit of broken pottery, covered with mud and wet clay. When the saguaro festival arrived, these earthenware vessels were opened and the syrup mixed with water and allowed to ferment, making tiswin.

== History ==
An inability to obtain tiswin was one of the reasons Geronimo and others left their reservation and attempted to return to the land of their ancestors.

== See also ==
- Corn beer
- Mezcal
- Tejuino
- Tequila
- Tesgüino
