= Tejuino =

Corn-based fermented beverage from Jalisco, Mexico

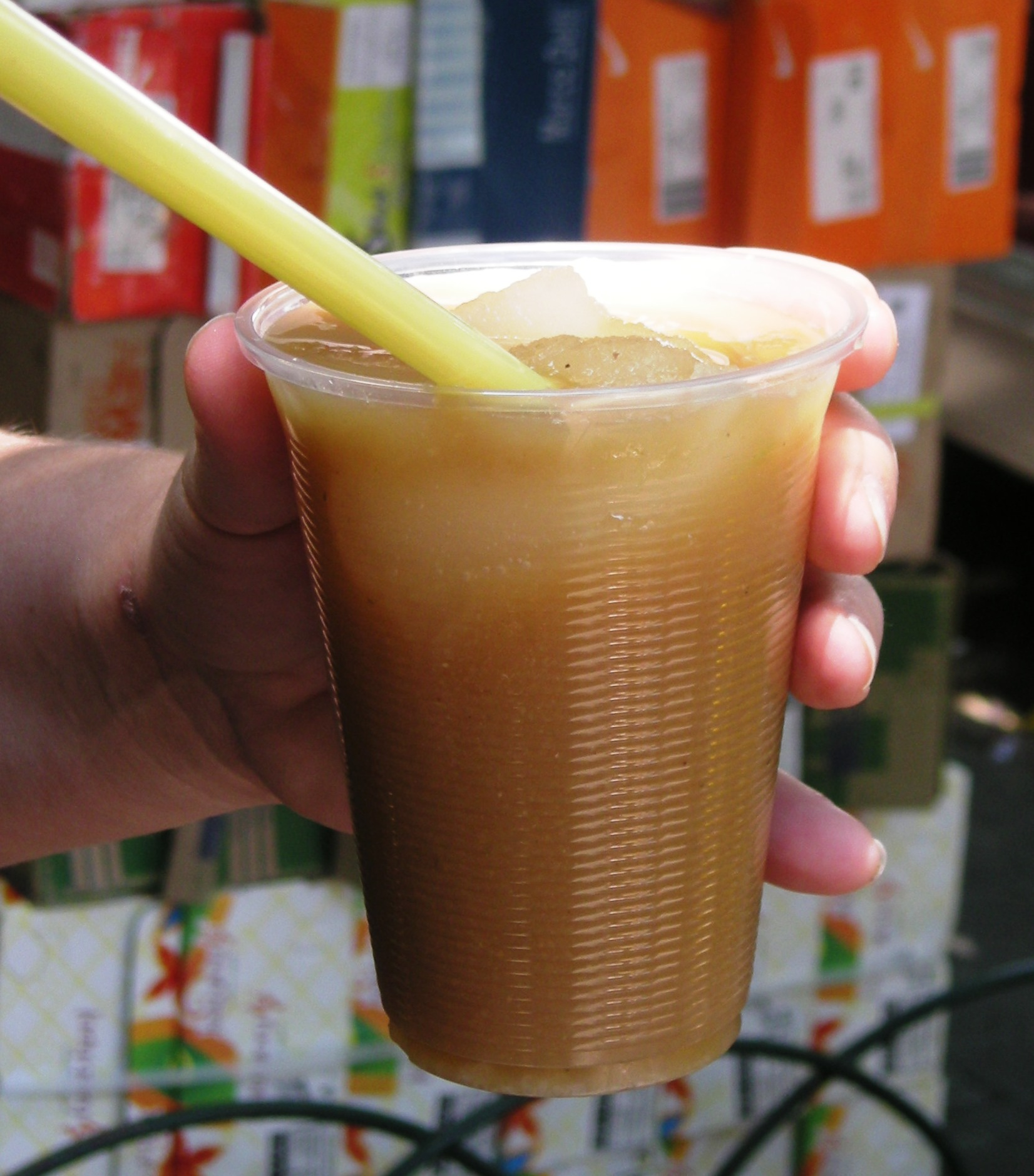
- A cup of tejuino with shaved ice in it.
- Course: Beverage
- Place of origin: Mexico
- Region or state: Jalisco/Nayarit
- Serving temperature: Ice cold
- Main ingredients: Corn, piloncillo, lemon, salt
- Variations: Lime sorbet (nieve de limón), chili powder

Tejuino is a cold, sugary fermented beverage made from corn and popularly consumed in the Mexican states of Jalisco, Colima, and Nayarit. Tejuino is usually made from corn dough, the same kind used for tortillas and tamales. The dough is mixed with water and piloncillo (cone-shaped unrefined cane sugar) and boiled until the liquid is very thick. The liquid is then allowed to ferment very slightly. The resulting drink is generally served cold, with lime juice, a pinch of salt and a scoop of shaved ice or lime sorbet.

Although the drink is strongly associated with the state of Jalisco, it is also commonly found in other parts of Mexico and more recently in Mexican American communities across the Southwestern United States. In Mexico it is usually sold by street vendors in small plastic cups or in plastic bags tied around a straw. In the United States it can be found in Mexican juice bars.

== Origin ==
The exact origin of tejuino is disputed; however, most Mexicans agree that the drink dates back to pre-Columbian times. The ancient Nahua people of Mexico viewed tejuino as the "drink of the gods" and it is still called this by some Mexicans today.

== Variations ==
Within the state of Jalisco, nieve de limon is a lime sorbet that is often added to the drink in Guadalajara, whereas in Puerto Vallarta, tejuino is served without it.

== Carbohydrate content ==
Reports in the analytical chemistry and food science literature have sampled a wide variety of tejuino varietals and have found carbohydrate content to range from approximately 50g to 80g per 8 oz serving. This is at least double, if not more than, the sugar content of a Coca-Cola beverage of similar volume.

== Alcohol content ==
Since tejuino is only allowed to ferment for a couple of days at most, the alcohol content is actually very low. There is a common misconception among Mexicans that one can get drunk from drinking too much tejuino; however, this is usually due to the addition of small amounts of beer in some recipes rather than the alcohol content of the tejuino itself. If allowed to ferment more than a few days, however, alcohol content can further increase to levels consistent with a mild, non-distilled alcoholic beverage.

== See also ==
- Amazake
- Boza
- List of maize dishes
- Malt beer
- Pozol
- Tepache
- Tesgüino
- Tiswin
