= Pox (drink) =

Ceremonial drink common among the Maya

- Origin: Mexico
- Ingredients: corn, sugar cane and wheat

Pox (pronounced 'Poshe') is a liquor commonly used for ceremonial purposes among the Mayans of Mexico and Central America. It is made of corn, sugar cane and wheat. Besides its religious significance it is also a somewhat popular alcoholic drink in the Chiapas region of southern Mexico. The word "pox" in Tzotzil means "medicine, cane liquor, cure." Pox was commonly used in religious ceremonies and festivals in San Juan Chamula, Chiapas, but increasingly soda has been substituted for it.

== External sources ==
Maffi, Luisa (1996). "Liquor and Medicine: A Mayan Case Study in Diachronic Semantics". Linguistic Anthropology. 6 (1): 27–46. doi:10.1525/jlin.1996.6.1.27.
