= Tesgüino =

Corn-based beer central to culture of Tarahumara Indians of Mexico

- Type: Corn beer
- Origin: Central Mexico, Uto-Aztecan peoples

Tesgüino is an artisanal corn beer produced by several Uto-Aztecan peoples. The Tarahumara people regard the beer as sacred, and it forms a significant part of their society. Anthropologist John Kennedy reports that "the average Tarahumaras spends at least 100 days per year directly concerned with tesgüino and much of this time under its influence or aftereffects."

== Etymology ==
Tesgüino comes from the Nahuatl tescuini which means "heartbeat".

== Tradition ==
The Tarahumara people gather every year during Easter week (semana santa) and drink large amounts of Tesgüino together while following rituals. According to the anthropologist Bill Merrill of the Smithsonian Institution, the sacred drink chases large souls from the persons who drink it and leaves them with their little souls, which is attributed to behavior perceived as being like that of children.

== Varieties ==
The general Tarahumara term for an alcoholic beverage is "Sugíki"; and "batári" is used when the beer is specifically made from corn or lichen flour; "paciki" is used when the beer is made from fresh corn stalks. While tesgüino made from corn is considered the most sacred, the Tarahumara also make beer from agave and wheat, as well as other alcoholic beverages made from fruits such as peaches, berries, crab apples, cactus fruits, and mesquite seeds.

== Production ==
The beer is made from corn kernels which are soaked, sprouted, then ground up, boiled and left to ferment naturally with wild yeast. A local grass is used in place of hops for flavouring. The process begins by malting the corn and spreading it in a shallow basket covered with pine needles each day for four or five days. It is kept moist until the corn sprouts by which time the starch in the corn has been converted into simpler sugars. It is then mashed and boiled for eight hours. Varied herbs are ground up and mixed with water into a paste which is then fermented overnight by a fire. Then the paste is combined with the corn liquid and fermented for another three to four days. The beer-drinking is commenced almost immediately after its preparation, since the beer will usually grow rancid after 24 hours.

In Mexico, tesgüino is prepared in ovoid-shaped water pots called “tesgüineras”.

== See also ==
- Tejuino
- Tiswin
- List of maize dishes

== Notes ==
1. Boza is an Eastern European beer made from wheat.
2. Pulque is a Mexican alcoholic beverage made from agave.
