= Tamarind pap =

Millet/tamarind porridge

Tamarind pap, also called kunun tsamiya, is a kind of kunu made with millet and tamarind by the Fulani and Hausa people in Nigeria. Tamarind is used as an acidifier, and it is sometimes spiced with black pepper, cloves, and ginger for health benefits and extra flavour. It is popular as breakfast.

Tamarind pap is paired with moi-moi (steamed bean pudding), akara (bean fritters) or fried plantain, and often a popular meal the Ramadan fasting period.

Locally prepared by soaking the tamarind pulp in hot to remove fibers and seeds, and the liquid is added to grounded millet powder. The mixture forms a thick paste and hot water is added to the paste to make pap.

== See also ==
- Ogi– Fermented grain drink
- Mageu – African fermented beverage
- Fermentation in food processing
- List of African dishes
