= Richard B. Bernstein =

American historian (1956–2023)

- Born: May 24, 1956; Flushing, New York, U.S.
- Died: June 26, 2023 (aged 67); New York City, U.S.
- Resting place: Baron Hirsch Cemetery, Staten Island, New York; 40.6221°N 74.1549°W
- Other name: R. B. Bernstein
- Education: Amherst College (BA); Harvard University (JD)
- Occupations: Biographer, author, academic

Richard B. Bernstein (May 24, 1956 – June 26, 2023) was an American constitutional historian, a distinguished adjunct professor of law at New York Law School, and lecturer in law and political science (after three years, 2011–2014, as adjunct professor of political science and history) at the City College of New York's Skadden, Arps Honors Program in Legal Studies in its Colin Powell School for Civic and Global Leadership.

== Life ==
Richard Bernstein was the oldest son of Fred Bernstein (1922–2001) and Marilyn Bernstein (née Berman, 1927–2016); his siblings are the artist Linda A. Bernstein (1958–2004) and the engineer, technology specialist, musician, and expert on BMW Steven J. Bernstein (born 1962). He was educated in the New York City public schools, graduating from Stuyvesant High School in 1973. He attended Amherst College, where he was graduated with a B.A. magna cum laude in 1977 in American Studies. While at Amherst, he was a research assistant to Henry Steele Commager. He graduated from Harvard Law School with a J.D. in November 1980.

After three years practicing law, Bernstein left the legal profession to return to the study of history, doing graduate work at New York University. From 1983 he has been a member of the New York University Legal History Colloquium, and he has been active in the writing of legal and constitutional history and in activities to promote the historical profession.

From 1984 to 1987 he was research curator for the Constitution Bicentennial Project of The New York Public Library, working with Kym S. Rice under the supervision of Richard B. Morris, Gouverneur Morris Professor of History Emeritus at Columbia University. Among the products of this project was Bernstein's first book, Are We to Be a Nation? The Making of the Constitution, published by Harvard University Press. From 1987 to 1990 Bernstein was historian on the staff of the New York City Commission on the Bicentennial of the U.S. Constitution, and from 1989 to 1990 he was research director of the New York State Commission on the Bicentennial of the Constitution.

In the spring of 1988 Bernstein was a visiting part-time lecturer in history at the Newark, New Jersey campus of Rutgers University. In 1991, he was named an adjunct assistant professor of law at New York Law School, where he has taught courses on American legal history and law and literature through 2014. In 2007 he was named distinguished adjunct professor of law. In 1997–1998 he also was the Daniel M. Lyons Visiting Professor of History at Brooklyn College of the City University of New York.

From 1997 to 2004 Bernstein was co-editor of book reviews for H-LAW, the listserv co-sponsored by H-NET (Humanities and Social Sciences Network On-Line) and the American Society for Legal History. He was also a member of H-LAW's editorial board. For three years he served on the editorial board of Law and Social Inquiry, the journal of the American Bar Foundation. In 2004 he was elected to the board of directors of the American Society for Legal History for a three-year term (2004–2007); in 2011, he was elected for a second term as a director of the society, which expired in 2014.

In the fall semester of 2011, Bernstein joined the Skadden, Arps Honors Program in Legal Studies at the City College of New York as an adjunct professor of political science. He taught American Constitutional Development, Early American Political Development, American history, the American judiciary, the American presidency, and African American Political Theory.

Beginning in the fall 2015 semester, he was named a full-time lecturer in law and political science teaching classes like "The Presidency".

In November 2002, in addition to his scholarly activities, Bernstein became director of online operations at Heights Books, Inc., a used-bookstore in Brooklyn, until the business closed at the end of February 2011.

Bernstein died in New York City on June 26, 2023, at the age of 67.

== Scholarship ==
Among the products of the New York Public Library's Constitution Bicentennial Project was Bernstein's first book, Are We to Be a Nation? The Making of the Constitution, published by Harvard University Press. Following Are We to Be a Nation?, Bernstein published Amending America: If We Love the Constitution So Much, Why Do We Keep Trying to Change It?, a history of the U.S. Constitution's amending process and the successful and unsuccessful attempts to amend the Constitution from 1789 through the early 1990s; Thomas Jefferson and Bolling v. Bolling: Law and the Legal Profession in Pre-Revolutionary America, coedited with Barbara Wilcie Kern and Bernard Schwartz (the full text, transcribed with scholarly annotations, of the pleadings and arguments of a complicated 1770 lawsuit about wills and bequests that pitted George Wythe against Thomas Jefferson); and Thomas Jefferson, published in 2003. Gordon S. Wood, reviewing Bernstein's Thomas Jefferson for The New York Times Book Review, called the book "the best short biography of Jefferson ever written."

Bernstein also co-edited several books with Professor Stephen L. Schechter of Russell Sage College, including Well Begun: Chronicles of the Early National Period (1989), New York and the Union: Contributions to the American Constitution Experience (1990), New York and the Bicentennial (1990), and Contexts of the Bill of Rights (1990). Roots of the Republic: American Founding Documents Interpreted, coedited with Schechter and Donald S. Lutz of the University of Houston, also appeared in 1990.

Bernstein published The Founding Fathers Reconsidered (Oxford University Press, 2009) in 2009, which on February 19, 2010, was named one of three finalists for the 2010 George Washington Book Prize sponsored by Washington College in partnership with the Gilder Lehrman Institute of American History and George Washington's Mount Vernon. In 2015, he published The Founding Fathers: A Very Short Introduction (Oxford University Press, 2015). In 2016 he published the edited volume An Expression of the American Mind: Selected Writings of Thomas Jefferson (Folio Society). His books-in-progress include a concise life of John Adams modeled on his 2003 biography of Thomas Jefferson; a study of Jefferson in Oxford's Very Short Introduction series; a study of the First Congress as an experiment in government; and an examination of the place of scientific ideas and technological developments in American constitutional history.

== Bibliography ==
- Richard B. Bernstein, Kym S. Rice, Are We to Be a Nation? The Making of the Constitution, Cambridge, Mass.: Harvard University Press, 1987, ISBN 978-0-674-04475-3
- Defending the Constitution (editor) (Mount Vernon, N.Y.: A. Colish, 1987).
- Into the Third Century: The Congress (New York: Walker, 1989) ISBN 978-0-8027-6832-2.
- Into the Third Century: The Presidency (New York: Walker, 1989) ISBN 978-0-8027-6829-2
- Into the Third Century: The Supreme Court (New York: Walker, 1989) ISBN 978-0-8027-6834-6.
- Well Begun: Chronicles of the Early National Period ((co-editor, with Stephen L. Schechter) Albany, NY: New York State Commission on the Bicentennial of the Constitution, 1989). ISBN 978-0-945660-00-2
- Richard B. Bernstein; Stephen L. Schechter, eds. (1989). Contexts of the Bill of Rights. Albany, NY: New York State Commission on the Bicentennial of the Constitution. ISBN 978-0-945660-04-0.
- Where the Experiment Began: New York City and the Two Hundredth Anniversary of George Washington's Inauguration: Final Report of the New York City Commission on the Bicentennial of the Constitution (New York: New York City Commission on the Bicentennial of the Constitution, 1989). ISBN 978-0-9625400-0-4
- New York and the Union (co-editor, with Stephen L. Schechter) (Albany, NY: New York State Commission on the Bicentennial of the Constitution, 1990). ISBN 978-0-945660-01-9
- New York and the Bicentennial (co-editor, with Stephen L. Schechter) (Albany, New York: New York State Commission on the Bicentennial of the Constitution, 1990). ISBN 978-0-945660-06-4
- Roots of the Republic: American Founding Documents Interpreted (co-editor, with Stephen L. Schechter and Donald S. Lutz) (Madison, WI: Madison House for the New York State Commission on the Bicentennial of the Constitution, 1990). ISBN 978-0-945660-06-4 (paperback), ISBN 978-0-945612-20-9 (hardcover).
- Amending America: If We Love the Constitution So Much, Why Do We Keep Trying to Change It? (New York: Times Books/Random House, 1993, ISBN 978-0-8129-2038-3; paperback, Lawrence: University Press of Kansas, 1995) (ISBN 9780700607150).
- Of the People, By the People, For the People: The Congress, the Presidency, and the Supreme Court in American History (New York: Wings Books, 1993, ISBN 978-0-517-09308-5) (reprint in one volume with updates and expansions of Into the Third Century series first issued in 1989).
- Thomas Jefferson and Bolling v. Bolling: Law and the Legal Profession in Pre-Revolutionary America (co-editor, with Barbara Wilcie Kern and Bernard Schwartz) (New York and San Marino, CA: New York University School of Law and Henry E. Huntington Library, 1997) ISBN 978-0-87328-158-4.
- The Constitution of the United States of America, with the Declaration of Independence and the Articles of Confederation (editor/introduction) (New York: Barnes & Noble Books, 2002) ISBN 978-0-7607-2833-8.
- The Wisdom of John and Abigail Adams (editor/introduction) (New York: Metro Books, 2002; reprint, New York: Fall River Press, 2008). ISBN 978-1-58663-576-3
- Thomas Jefferson. New York: Oxford University Press. 2003. ISBN 978-0-19-516911-9. "richard b. bernstein."
- Thomas Jefferson: The Revolution of Ideas (New York: Oxford University Press, 2004) (Oxford Portraits series)
- The Founding Fathers Reconsidered (New York: Oxford University Press, 2009; pbk 2011) ISBN 978-0-19-533832-4.
- Making Legal History: Essays in Honor of William E. Nelson (co-editor, with Daniel J. Hulsebosch) (New York: New York University Press, 2013) ISBN 978-0-8147-2526-9.
- An Expression of the American Mind: Selected Writings of Thomas Jefferson (introduction/selection/editing/headnotes) (London: Folio Society, 2013).
- The Founding Fathers: A Very Short Introduction (Oxford University Press, 2015) (Oxford Very Short Introductions series). ISBN 978-0-19-027351-4.
- Abraham Lincoln: Writings and Reflections (introduction/selection/editing/headnotes) (London: Sirius/Arcturus Publishing, 2019).
- The Education of John Adams (New York: Oxford University Press, 4 July 2020).
