= William Leuchtenburg =

American historian and political scientist (1922–2025)

- Born: William Edward Leuchtenburg; September 28, 1922; New York City, U.S.
- Died: January 28, 2025 (aged 102); Chapel Hill, North Carolina, U.S.
- Years active: 1952–2024
- Spouses: Jean McIntire (divorced) (died 2024); Jean Anne Williams
- Children: 3
- Awards: Bancroft Prize (1964); Francis Parkman Prize (1965); North Carolina Award (2007)

Academic background
- Education: Cornell University; Columbia University
- Influences: Henry Steele Commager

Academic work
- Discipline: History
- Sub-discipline: American history
- Institutions: University of North Carolina at Chapel Hill
- Doctoral students: John D'Emilio; Otis L. Graham; Christopher Lasch; Steven F. Lawson; Richard Polenberg; Leonard Dinnerstein
- Notable works: Franklin D. Roosevelt and the New Deal, 1932–1940 (1963)

William Edward Leuchtenburg (/ˈlʌktənˌbɜːrɡ/ LUCK-tuhn-berg; September 28, 1922 – January 28, 2025) was an American historian who was the William Rand Kenan Jr. Professor of History at the University of North Carolina at Chapel Hill, and a leading scholar of the life and career of Franklin Delano Roosevelt.

== Early life and education ==
Leuchtenburg was born in the Ridgewood neighborhood of Queens, New York, on September 28, 1922. He was raised in various parts of Queens. He was of German and Irish descent. On Ken Burns' documentary series Prohibition, he described, when he was a child, how his father was reported for operating an illegal distillery during the Prohibition Era. He received his BA degree in 1943 from Cornell University, where he was inducted into the Phi Beta Kappa society. He later received his PhD from Columbia University in 1951.

== Career ==
Leuchtenburg taught at Columbia University and the University of North Carolina, Chapel Hill.

He won the 2007 North Carolina Award for Literature.

He served as a program consultant for Ken Burns' documentary series Prohibition, which premiered on PBS in October 2011.

He was a president of the American Historical Association, the Organization of American Historians, and the Society of American Historians. Eric Foner is the only other historian to claim that distinction.

== Personal life and death ==
Leuchtenburg's marriage to Jean McIntire, which ended in divorce, produced three children. He later married Jean Anne Williams.

Leuchtenburg was a Democrat who was a delegate to the 1952 Democratic National Convention and was active in liberal causes.

Leuchtenburg turned 100 on September 28, 2022, and died at his home in Chapel Hill, North Carolina, on January 28, 2025, at the age of 102.

== Bibliography ==
Leuchtenburg was the author of more than a dozen books on 20th-century history, including the Bancroft Prize–winning Franklin D. Roosevelt and the New Deal, 1932–1940 (1963), a volume in the New American Nation series co-edited by his mentor Henry Steele Commager and Richard B. Morris. His works include:

- "Progressivism and Imperialism: The Progressive Movement and American Foreign Policy, 1898-1916." Mississippi Valley Historical Review 39.3 (1952): 483–504. online
- "Roosevelt, Norris and the 'Seven Little TVAs'." Journal of Politics 14.3 (1952): 418–441.
- Flood Control Politics: The Connecticut River Valley Problem, 1927–1950 (1953)
- The Perils of Prosperity, 1914–32 (1958) ISBN 978-0-226-47371-0 online
- The New Freedom: A Call for the Emancipation of the Generous Energies of a People (Introduction) (1961)
- The LIFE History of the United States, Volume 11: 1933–1945 – New Deal and Global War (1963)
- The LIFE History of the United States, Volume 12: From 1945 – The Great Age of Change (1963)
- Franklin D. Roosevelt and the New Deal, 1932–1940 (1963) online
- "The Origins of Franklin D. Roosevelt's" Court-Packing" Plan." The Supreme Court Review 1966 (1966): 347–400.
- The New Deal: A Documentary History (1968)
- Growth of the American Republic (2 vols.) with Samuel Eliot Morison and Henry Steele Commager (1969)
- A Troubled Feast: American Society Since 1945 (1973)
- "A Klansman Joins the Court: The Appointment of Hugo L. Black." The University of Chicago Law Review 41 (1973): 1+.
- New Deal and Global War (1974)
- The Growth of the American Republic (Volume I) with Samuel Eliot Morison and Henry Steele Commager (1980)
- A Concise History of the American Republic (Single Volume) with Samuel Eliot Morison and Henry Steele Commager (1983)
- In the Shadow of FDR: From Harry Truman to Ronald Reagan (1989; fourth edition, subtitled From Harry Truman to Barack Obama, 2009) online
- The Perils of Prosperity, 1914–1932 (The Chicago History of American Civilization) (1993)
- The Supreme Court Reborn: The Constitutional Revolution in the Age of Roosevelt (1996)
- The FDR Years: On Roosevelt and His Legacy (1997)
- American Places: Encounters with History (editor) (2000)
- That Man: An Insider's Portrait of Franklin D. Roosevelt with Robert H. Jackson et al. (2004)
- The White House Looks South: Franklin D. Roosevelt, Harry S. Truman, Lyndon B. Johnson (2005)
- The Executive Branch (2006)
- Herbert Hoover (The American Presidents Series) (2006)
- The American President: From Teddy Roosevelt to Bill Clinton (2015)
- Patriot Presidents: From George Washington to John Quincy Adams (2024)
