= Declaration of Interdependence =

Title used by various documents

There have been a number of documents designated as the Declaration of Interdependence since at least the 1930s.

== Overview ==
US Secretary of Agriculture Henry A. Wallace used the term in relation to the Farm Act of 1933 in a radio address broadcast on May 13 of that year, and apparently used the phrase again in 1936 in relation to "interdependence among nations and cultures." Later that year the phrase was quoted in Walter P. Taylor's essay "What is Ecology and What Good is it?" in the journal Ecology Vol. 17 (July 1936). This was the first use of the phrase in an ecological context.

A copy of Durant's Declaration of INTERdependence

On April 8, 1944 American philosopher and historian Will Durant was approached by two leaders of the Jewish and Christian faiths, Meyer David and Dr. Christian Richard about starting "a movement, to raise moral standards." He suggested instead that they start a movement against racial intolerance and outlined his ideas for a "Declaration of Interdependence". The movement for the declaration, Declaration of INTERdependence, Inc., was launched at a gala dinner at the Hollywood Roosevelt Hotel on March 22, 1945 attended by over 400 people including Thomas Mann and Bette Davis. The Declaration was read into the Congressional Record on October 1, 1945 by Ellis E. Patterson.

In 1969 Cliff Humphrey, founder of Ecology Action, drafted a "Unanimous Declaration of Interdependence" and published it in Whole Earth Catalogue Supplement September 1969.

In 1976 two "Declarations of Interdependence" were presented to the public. One was the "Greenpeace Declaration of Interdependence" published by Greenpeace in the Greenpeace Chronicles (Winter 1976-77). This declaration was a condensation of a number of ecological manifestos Bob Hunter had written over the years. The “Three basic Laws of Ecology,” mentioned in the text were developed by Patrick Moore, with inspiration from the writings of Barry Commoner.

Another Declaration of Interdependence was drafted by Henry Steele Commager and presented to the World Affairs Councils of Philadelphia on October 24, 1975. It was signed in a ceremony on January 30, 1976 at Congress Hall, Independence National Historical Park, Philadelphia by several members of Congress. It was also "endorsed" by a number of non-governmental organizations and United Nations specialized agencies.

A document entitled "Declaration of interdependence: a new global ethics" was adopted by the board of directors of the International Humanist and Ethical Union on 31 December 1988.

David Suzuki wrote a Declaration of Interdependence in 1992 for that year's Earth Summit. As of September 2019, his foundation had 22 translations of the declaration and used it to define the foundation's work.

The PM Declaration of Interdependence, a statement of management principles for software, was published in 2005.

The B Corp Declaration of Interdependence on socially responsible business is here.
