= Ogi (food) =

Cereal pudding in Nigeria

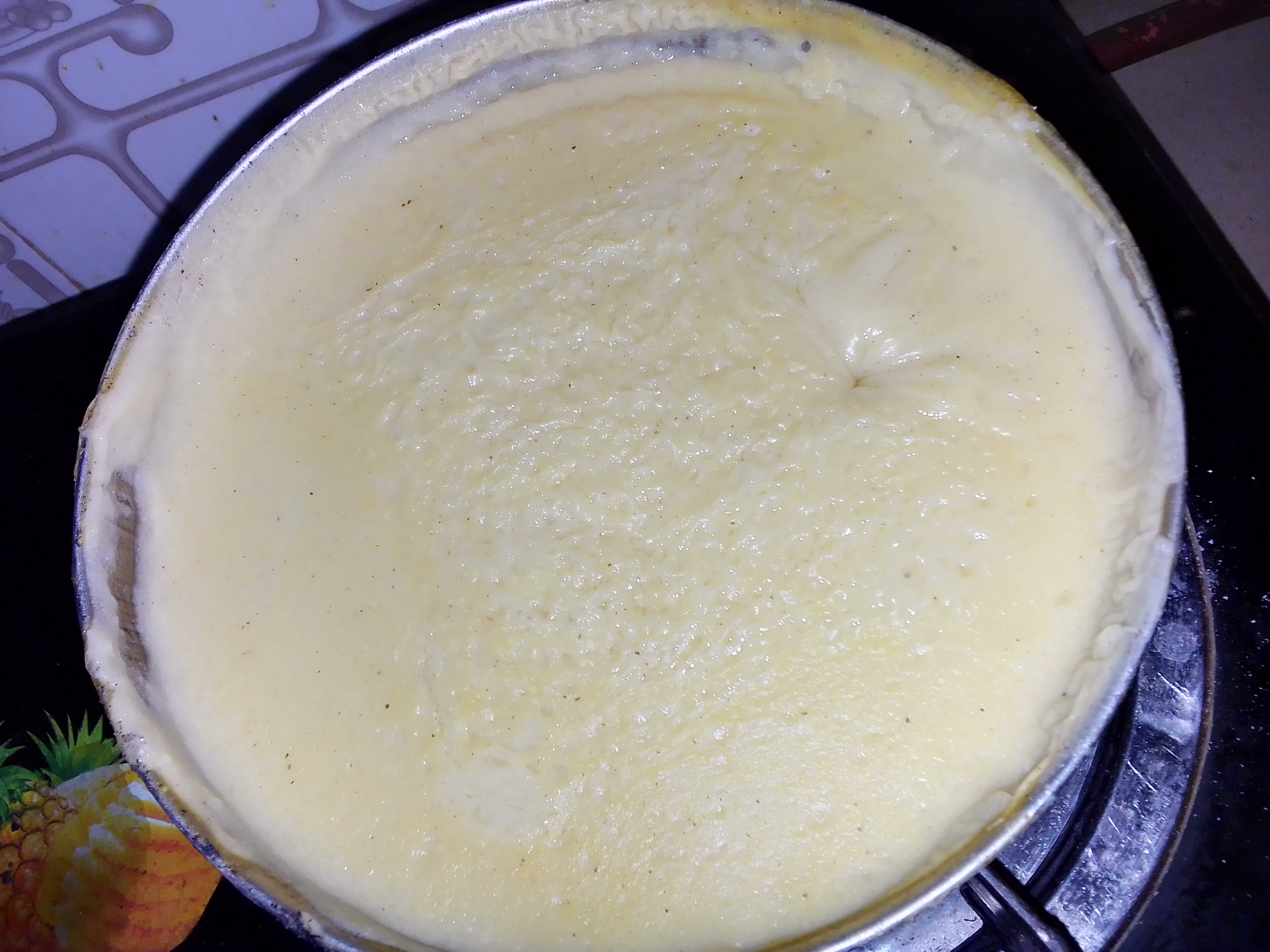
- Type: Pap or pudding
- Place of origin: Nigeria
- Region or state: West Africa
- Main ingredients: Maize, sorghum or millet
- Ingredients generally used: Sugar
- Variations: Uji in Kenya

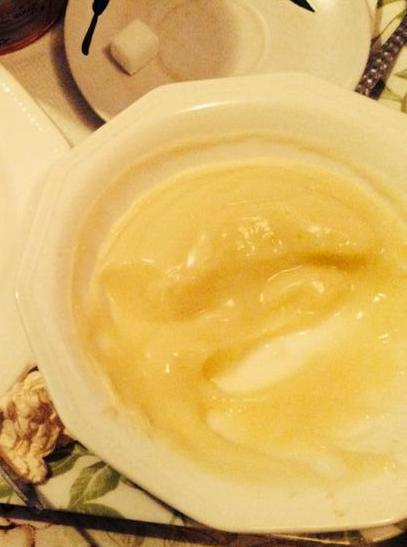
Ogi, also known as pap and akamu, a Nigerian dish made from corn. It is more commonly known as koko to the Hausa, akamu to the Igbo and ogi to the Yoruba. It is eaten for breakfast or dinner, and may be sweetened with sugar or honey.

Ogi, pap, eko, koko or akamu is a cereal pudding and street food in Nigeria, Benin and Togo., typically made from maize, sorghum, or millet. Traditionally, the grains are soaked in water for up to three days, before wet-milling or grinding, sieving to remove husks, and straining. It is then boiled into a pap, or cooked to make a creamy pudding also known as agidi or eko. It may be eaten with moin moin, acarajé or bread. In solid jello form, it is called eko or agidi. In soft pudding form, it is called koko, ogi or akamu. Ogi baba is the brown type made from sorghum or millet, many times fermented.

== Overview ==
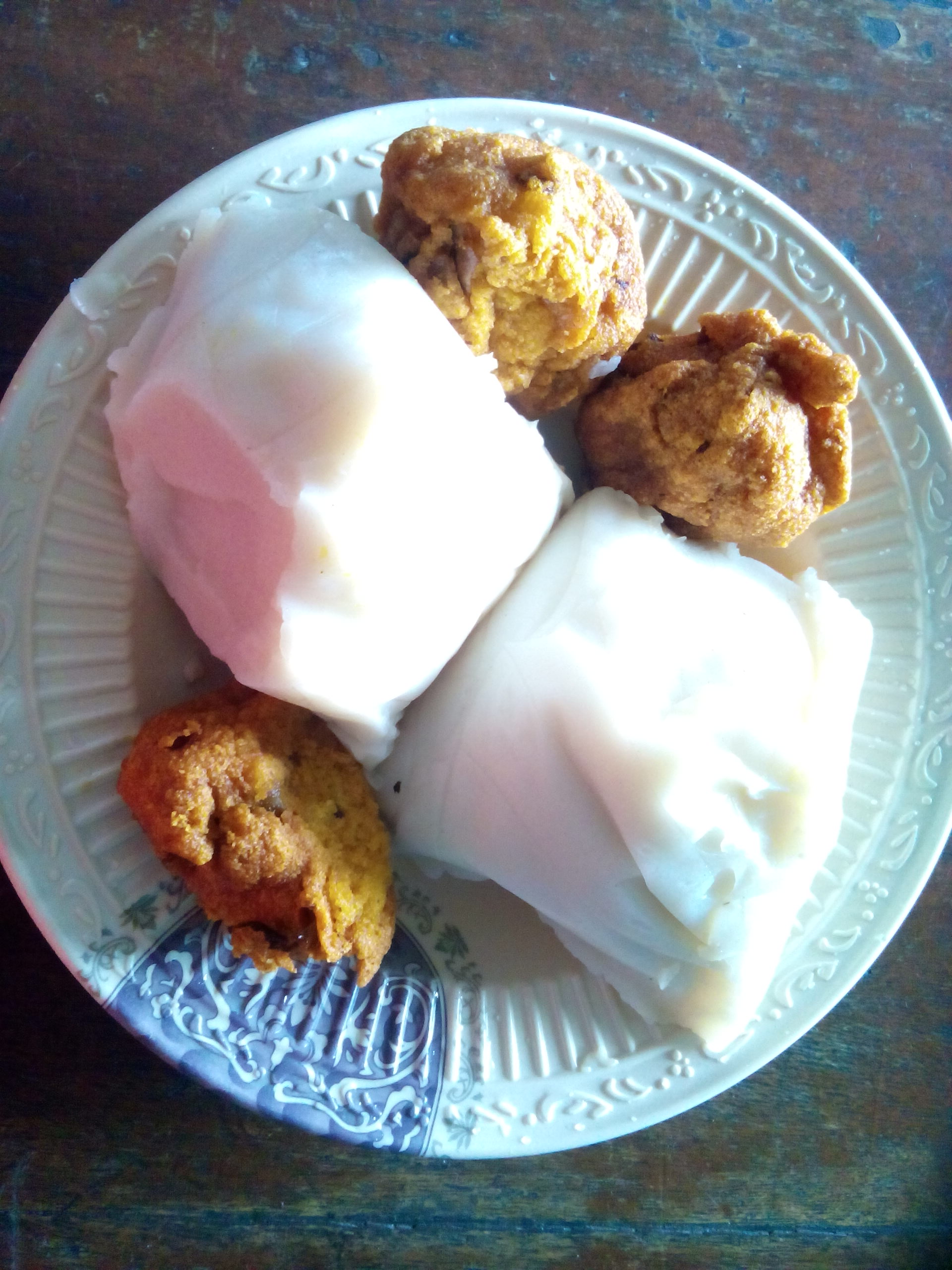
Eko

In Kenya, the porridge is known as uji (not to be confused with ugali) and is generally made with millet and sorghum. It is commonly served for breakfast and dinner, but often has a thinner gravy-like consistency.

The fermentation of ogi is performed by various lactic acid bacteria including Lactobacillus spp. and various yeasts including Saccharomyces and Candida spp.

The dish is known as Akamu among the Igbo people of southeastern Nigeria and is prepared in a manner similar to British custard. Akamu is commonly served with a variety of accompaniments, including:

- Pap and Milk with Sugar
- Akamu and Akara
- Ogi and Moi Moi
- Akamu and fried plantains (dodo)
- Pap and honey

== Ingredients ==
- White Corn
- Water

== See also ==
- Boza – Fermented grain drink
- Fermentation in food processing
- List of African dishes
- Mageu – African fermented beverage
- Poi – Starchy Polynesian dish that is sometimes fermented
- Pozol – Fermented corn drink from the Americas
- Tamarind pap
