= Olla =

Cookware and bakeware

An olla is a ceramic jar, often unglazed, used for cooking stews or soups, for the storage of water or dry foods, or for other purposes like the irrigation of olive trees. Ollas have short wide necks and wider bellies, resembling beanpots or South Asian matki.

== History ==
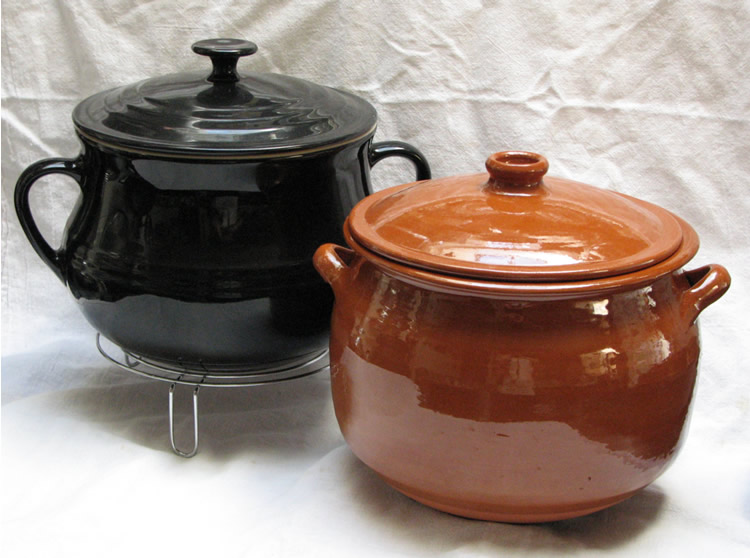
A French soupière/beanpot (on a trivet) and a Spanish olla

=== Antiquity ===
The Latin word olla or aulla (also aula) meant a very similar type of pot in Ancient Roman pottery, used for cooking and storage as well as a funerary urn to hold the ashes from cremation of bodies. Later, in Celtic Gaul, the olla became a symbol of the god Sucellus, who reigned over agriculture.

=== Spain ===
In Spain, the popular dish olla podrida (literally “rotten pot”), cooked in an olla, dates back to the Middle Ages.

==== Catalonia ====
In certain areas of the Pyrenees in Catalonia a type of olla, known locally as tupí, is used as container for the preparation of tupí, a certain type of cheese.

=== American Southwest ===
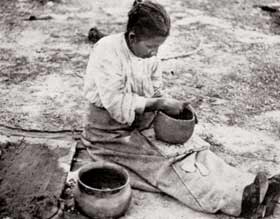
A Catawba potter making an olla, 1908

The Spanish settlers may have introduced the olla to Native American tribes which they reproduced for sale to colonists, but they had their own traditional pots attributed to their respective tribes. Catawba potters, native to the southeast, used unglazed pottery.

Among Southwestern Native American tribes, ollas used for storing water often were made with narrow necks to prevent evaporation in the desert heat. The olla is used by the Kwaaymii people, among many others, for cooking, storing water, serving meals and even nursing infants.

The term olla is also applied to regional basketry shaped with bulbous bodies and narrow necks. Olla baskets are commonly used by the Western Apache, Shoshone, and Yavapai.

== Use in irrigation ==
Because water seeps through the walls of an unglazed olla by using soil-moisture tension, one can use ollas to irrigate plants. The olla is buried in the ground, with the neck of the olla extending above the soil. The olla is filled with water, and plants such as tomatoes, melons, corn, beans, carrots, etc. are planted around the olla. Or, an olla can be put near a new sapling, or bush to get it through its first year. After that, given enough annual rain, the olla near the tree or bush can be lifted out of the ground and used somewhere else.

Olla irrigation works like this:

- When the soil around the olla is dry, the soil pulls the water through the wall of the olla and into the soil, (the tension is between wet and dry), thus providing water for the roots.
- When the soil is wet from rain or has not dried out yet, there is no tension and the water is not pulled through the wall of the olla.

How far out the water is pulled depends on the size of the olla and the quality of the soil. Dense soil (clay) does not water out as far as good soil. Large ollas, with a capacity of (say) 11 liters, will water longer than a smaller 1 liter olla, for example. Olla, or clay pot, irrigation is considered the most efficient watering system by many, since the plants are never over- or under-watered, saving from 50% to 70% in water, according to Farmer's Almanac. Watering below the soil level allows the plant roots to get what water they need, and therefore to grow stronger roots. As Geoff Lawton says, clay pots can make your garden drought-proof. Little water is lost to evaporation or run-off.

Spanish settlers introduced this irrigation technique to the Americas in colonial times. Agriculture and gardening specialists are teaching it, and olla use is making a comeback in New Mexico and the American West. The state's master gardening program is spreading the word. It can be effective for homeowners to use in the desert climate. It has also been put to use by the Global Buckets project.

As a modern gardening tool, ollas are generally made from terracotta plant pots. There are various methods to create them, but one of the easiest is to fill the bottom opening in an unglazed terracotta pot, bury it in the ground, and keep it topped up with water. Plants need to be within roots'-reach of the olla to make use of the water reservoir.

In their September 2013 newsletter Ecology Action describes using five 5-gallon ollas for a 100-square-foot garden plot. The test plot used 1.25 gallons per olla every four days. The ollas are fitted with caps that reduce evaporation and collect rain.

== Use in refrigeration ==
The olla is also useful for keeping water cool. When an unglazed olla is filled with water, the water permeates the clay walls of the vessel, causing the olla to “sweat”. The evaporation of the sweat cools the olla and its contents. In the early 20th century, many ranches in the American Southwest used the practice of hanging an olla from a rope on the verandah in a shady, breezy spot. Several hours after the olla was hung, it was cooled enough by evaporation to keep butter and milk safely cold.

== As works of art ==
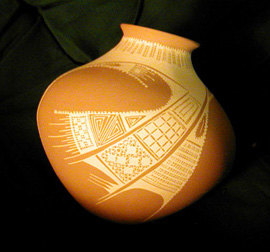
Mata Ortiz pottery – Juan Quezada

In addition to utilitarian purposes, ollas are also produced by Native American and Mexican potters as artistic works. These ollas may be highly decorated and/or formed.

== See also ==
- List of cooking vessels
- Plain of Jars
