= Tupí =

Catalan cheese

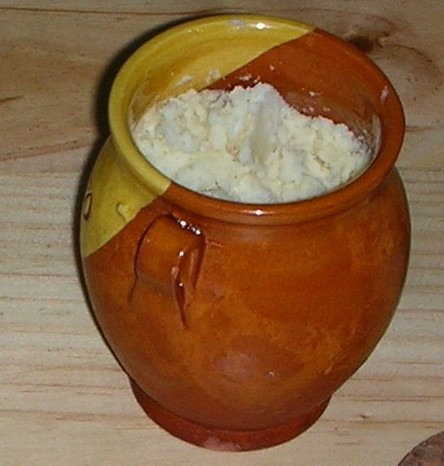
- Country of origin: Catalonia, Spain
- Region: Pallars, Alt Urgell, Cerdanya
- Source of milk: Cows, sheep
- Texture: Soft

Tupí, also known as formatge de tupí, is a fermented cheese of a certain area of the Pyrenees and Pre-Pyrenees made from cows' or sheep's milk.

It is a cheese traditionally prepared in the mountainous Pallars region, as well as in the Cerdanya and the Alt Urgell. Together with the llenguat, another fermented cheese of the same area, it is one of the few varieties of cheese of true Catalan origin.

== Description ==
Tupí cheese was home made in rural households according to old custom. It is quite soft and creamy, containing a high proportion of fat. Owing to its strong taste it is usually eaten with farmer-style bread along with strong wine. It can also be used as an ingredient for the preparation of sauces.

Its preparation includes sheep's or cow's milk and aiguardent or another similarly strong liquor. The fresh cheese is pressed by hand until it takes a ball shape and all liquid is drained from it. Then it is put inside of a tupí glazed ceramic jar and the liquor is added. The mixture is then stirred from time to time the first four or five days after preparation.

Following the preparation process the jar is covered and kept in a cool and dry place for a minimum of two months during which the cheese ferments, reaching the desired consistency. Some households add olive oil to the cheese in the jar after fermentation.

== See also ==
- Fermentation in food processing
