= Berenice Robinson =

American author, composer, editor, and teacher

Berenice Robinson Morris (27 March 1909 - 13 July 1990) was an American author, composer, editor, and teacher who is best remembered for her American Popular Music series of books for children. Her works were published under the names Berenice Robinson Morris and Berenice Robinson.

Robinson was born in New York. She attended the Curtis Institute of Music, where she studied with Rosario Scalero, and the Juilliard School. She married the historian Richard B. Morris in 1930, and they had two sons.

In 1932, Robinson won the Joseph H. Bearns Prize in both of its categories: larger-form works (for orchestra or chorus) and smaller-form works (chamber music.) She taught at Long Island University and in 1969 was a Fulbright Lecturer in music at the Free University of Berlin.

Today, Robinson is best known for her three volume history for children, American Popular Music, which was published in the early 1970s by Franklin Watts. She also served as music editor for Harper's Encyclopedia of the Modern World and the Encyclopedia of American History.

Robinson composed Jewish liturgical music as well as choral and instrumental music through at least opus 13. Her publications include:

== Books ==
- American Popular Music: The Beginning Years (illustrated by Leonard Everett Fisher)
- American Popular Music: The Growing Years 1800-1900
- American Popular Music: The Twentieth Century

== Orchestra ==
- Overture in D, opus 13

== Vocal ==
- Three Songs
