= Fermentation in food processing =

Converting carbohydrates to alcohol or acids using anaerobic microorganisms

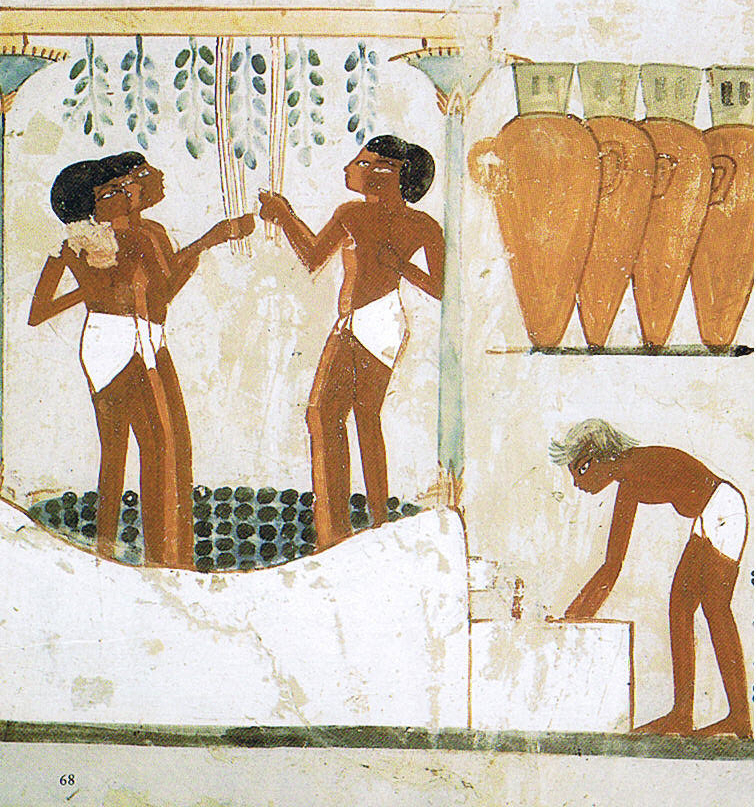
Grapes being trodden to extract the juice and made into wine in storage jars. Tomb of Nakht, 18th dynasty, Thebes, Ancient Egypt.

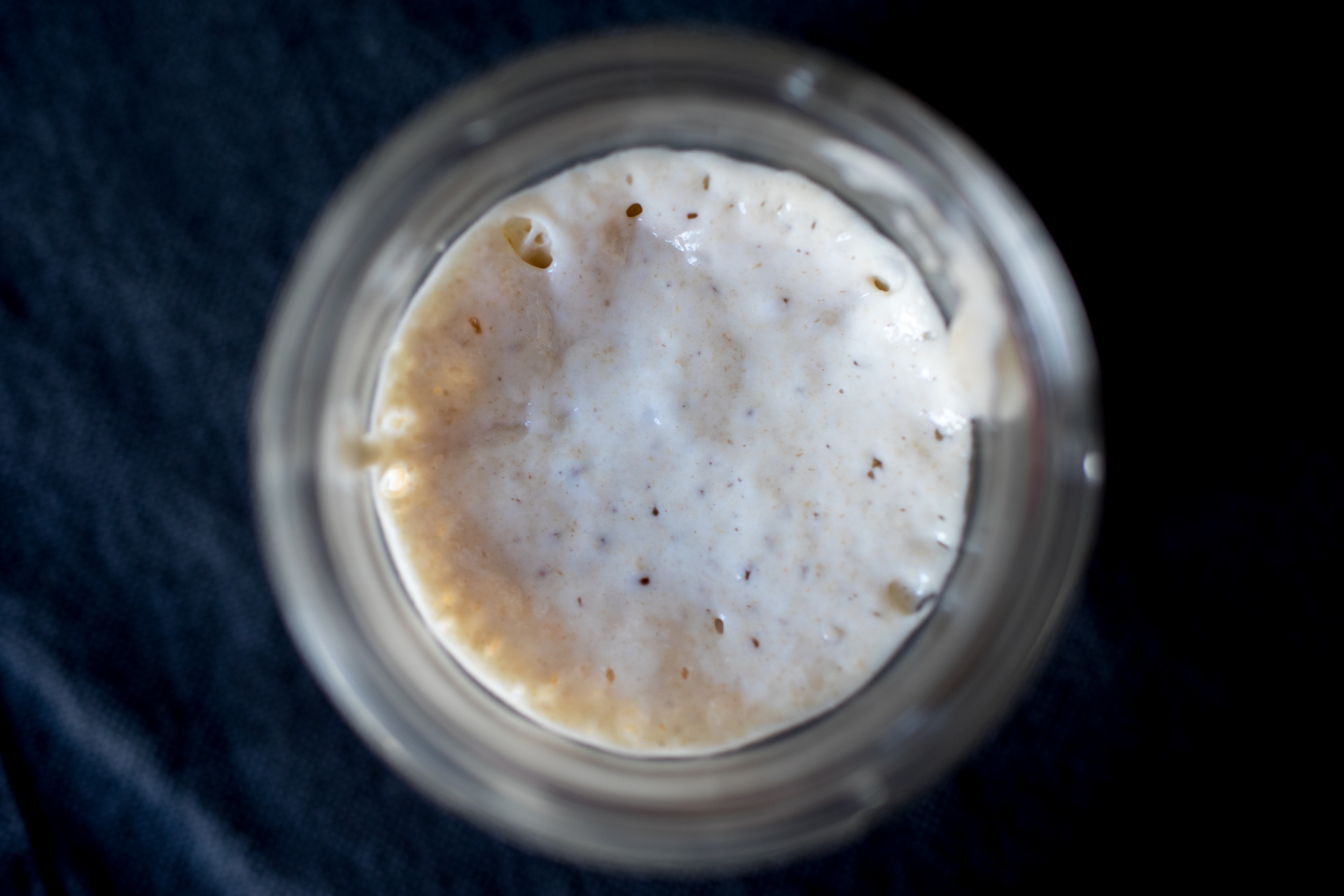
Sourdough starter.

In food processing, fermentation is the conversion of carbohydrates to alcohol or organic acids using microorganisms—yeasts or bacteria—without an oxidizing agent being used in the reaction. Fermentation usually implies that the action of microorganisms is desired. The science of fermentation is known as zymology or zymurgy.

The term "fermentation" sometimes refers specifically to the chemical conversion of sugars into ethanol, producing alcoholic drinks such as wine, beer, and cider. However, similar processes take place in the leavening of bread (CO_{2} produced by yeast activity), and in the preservation of sour foods with the production of lactic acid, such as in sauerkraut and yogurt.

Other widely consumed fermented foods include vinegar, olives, and cheese. More localized foods prepared by fermentation may also be based on beans, grain, vegetables, fruit, honey, dairy products, and fish.

== History and prehistory ==
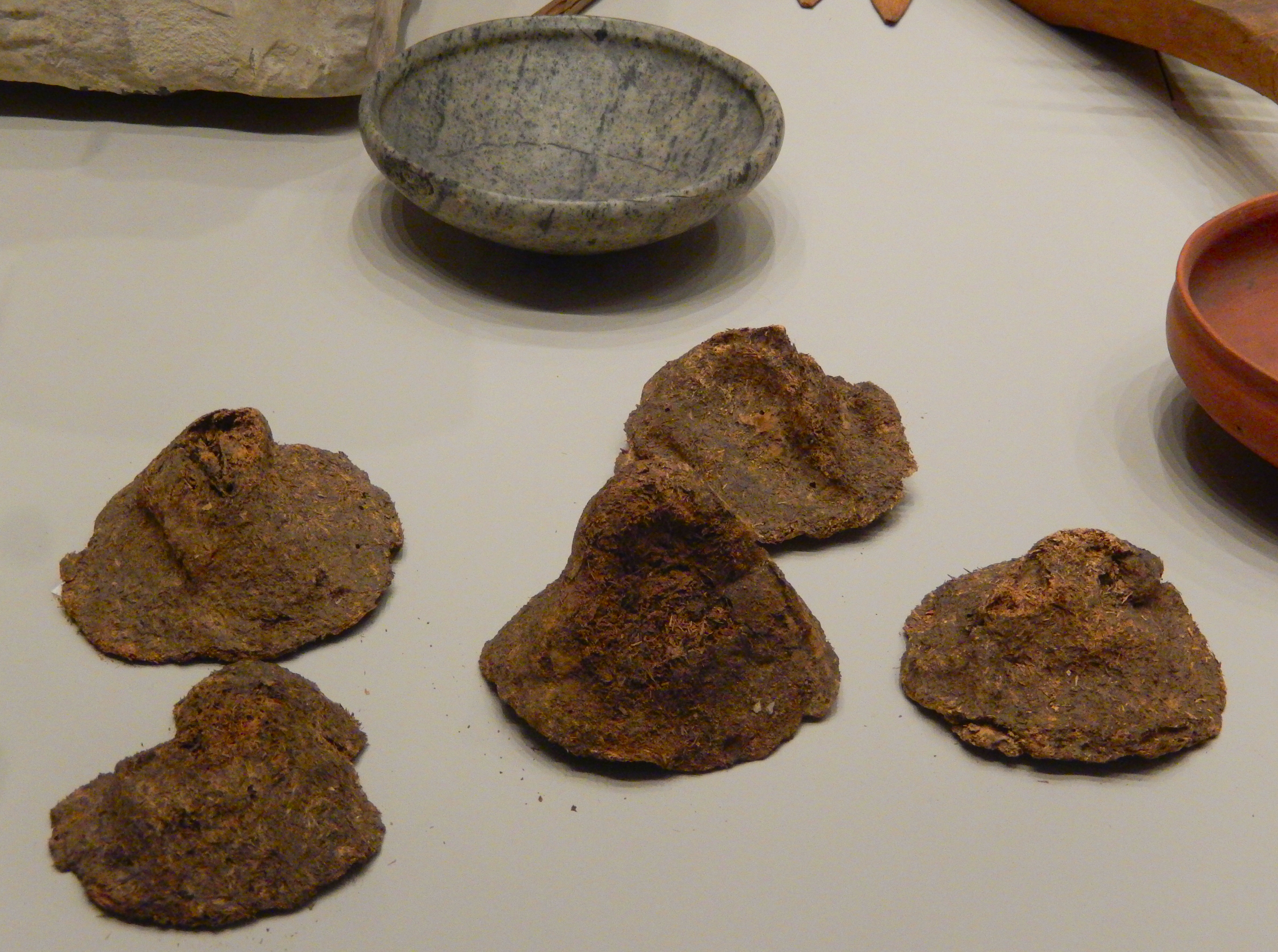
Conical loaves of bread left as grave goods, exactly as laid out in the Great Tomb at Gebelein, Egypt, 2435–2305 BC

=== Brewing and winemaking ===
Natural fermentation predates human history. Since ancient times humans have exploited fermentation, most likely having unintentionally discovered the process. To store excess foods, humans placed the items in a container which were probably later forgotten, and over time yeast and bacteria started to grow. The earliest archaeological evidence of fermentation is the 13,000-year-old residue of beer, with the consistency of gruel, found in a cave near Haifa, Israel. Another early alcoholic drink, made from fruit, rice, and honey, dates from 7000 to 6600 BC in the Neolithic Chinese village of Jiahu. Winemaking dates from circa 6000 BC in Georgia in the Caucasus area. Seven-thousand-year-old jars containing the remains of wine, now on display at the University of Pennsylvania, were excavated in the Zagros Mountains in Iran. There is strong evidence that people were fermenting alcoholic drinks in Babylon (ca. 3000 BC), ancient Egypt (ca. 3150 BC), pre-Hispanic Mexico (ca. 2000 BC), and Sudan (ca. 1500 BC).

=== Discovery of the role of yeast ===
The French chemist Louis Pasteur founded zymology in 1856 when he connected yeast to fermentation. In studying the conversion of sugar to alcohol by yeast, Pasteur concluded that the fermentation was catalyzed by a vital force, called "ferments", within the yeast cells. The "ferments" were thought to function only within living organisms. Pasteur wrote that "Alcoholic fermentation is an act correlated with the life and organization of the yeast cells, not with the death or putrefaction of the cells."

=== "Cell-free fermentation" ===
Nevertheless it was known that living yeast cells were not a requirement for fermentation. In 1897 the German chemist and zymologist Eduard Buchner of Humboldt University of Berlin found that sugar was fermented even when there were no living yeast cells in the mixture, by an enzyme complex secreted by yeast that he termed zymase. In 1907 he received the Nobel Prize in Chemistry for his research and discovery of "cell-free fermentation".

One year earlier in 1906 ethanol fermentation studies led to the early discovery of oxidized nicotinamide adenine dinucleotide (NAD^{+}).

== Uses ==
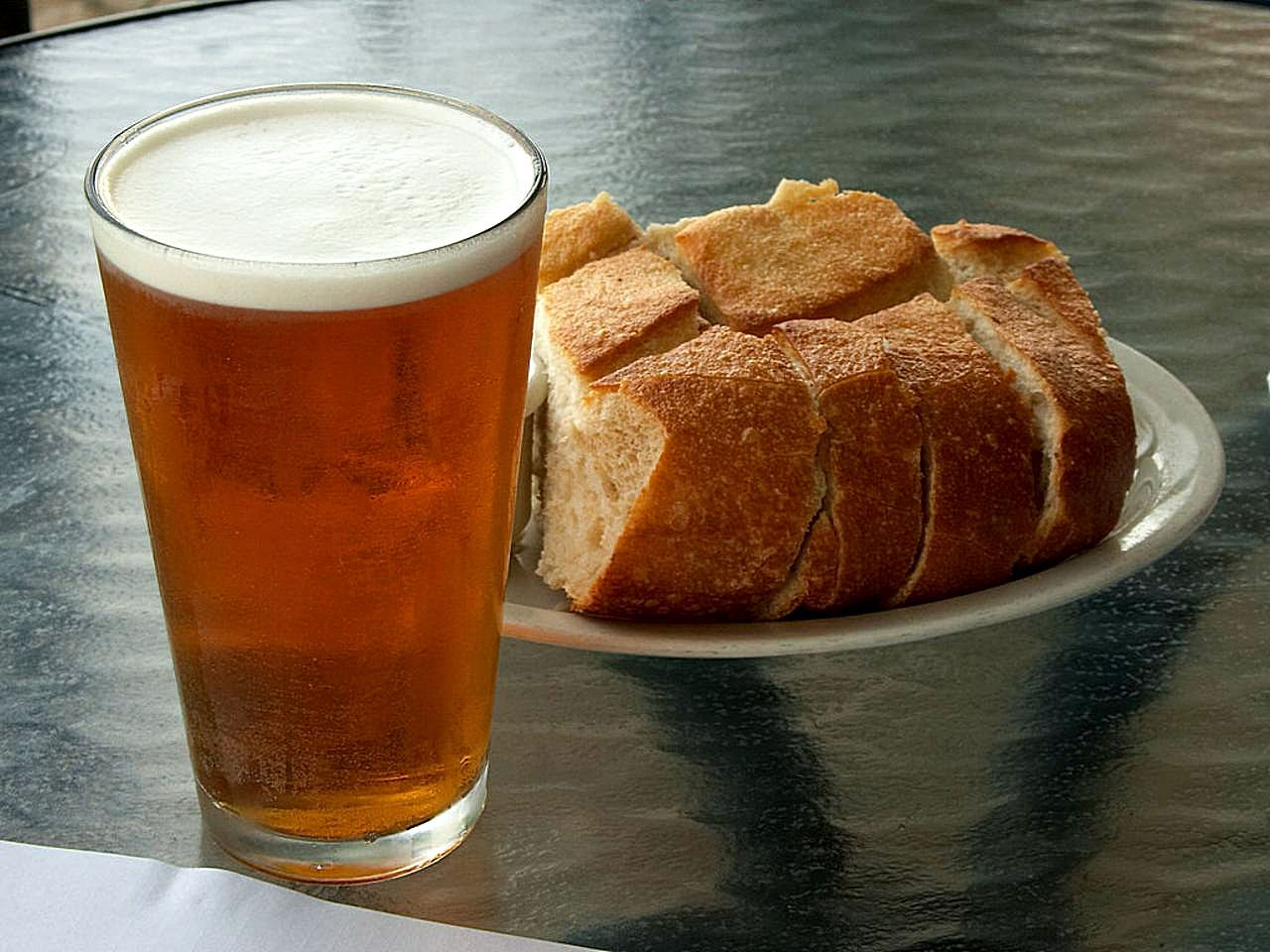
Beer and bread, two major uses of fermentation in food

The byproducts of food fermentation are alcohol, preservative organic acids, and carbon dioxide, all three of which have found human uses. The production of alcohol results in fruit juices becoming wine, grains becoming beer, and foods rich in starch, such as potatoes, that are then distilled into spirits like gin and vodka. The production of carbon dioxide is used to leaven bread. The production of organic acids is exploited to preserve and flavor vegetables and dairy products.

Food fermentation serves five main purposes: to enrich the diet through development of a diversity of flavors, aromas, and textures in food substrates; To preserve substantial amounts of food through lactic acid, alcohol, acetic acid, and alkaline fermentations; to enrich food substrates with protein, essential amino acids, and vitamins; to eliminate antinutrients; and to reduce cooking time and the associated use of fuel.

Beverages produced through fermentation have likely been universally associated with ceremonies and festivals. There is some understanding of how they have been consumed in such contexts, derived from the construction of drinkware and the residue contained therein.

== Fermented foods by region ==
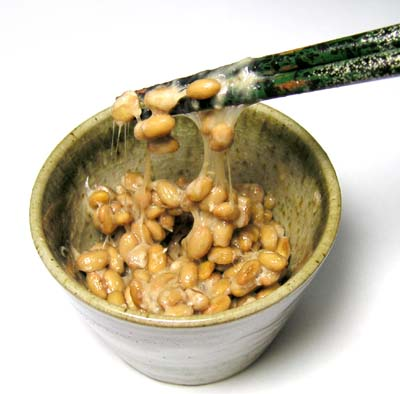
Nattō, a Japanese fermented soybean food made using Bacillus species

- Worldwide: alcohol (beer, wine), vinegar, olives, yogurt, bread, cheese
- Asia
  - East and Southeast Asia: amazake, atchara, belacan, burong mangga, com ruou, doenjang, douchi, fish sauce, lah pet, lambanog, kimchi, kombucha, leppet-so, narezushi, miso, nata de coco, nattō, ngapi, oncom, padaek, pla ra, prahok, ruou nep, sake, shrimp paste, soju, soy sauce, stinky tofu, tape, tempeh, tempoyak, zha cai
  - Central Asia: kumis, kefir, shubat, qatiq (yogurt)
  - South Asia: achar, appam, dosa, dhokla, dahi (yogurt), idli, mixed pickle, ngari, sinki, tongba, paneer
- Africa: garri, injera, laxoox, mageu, ogi, ogiri, iru
- Americas: chicha, chocolate, vanilla, hot sauce, tepache, tibicos, pulque, muktuk, kiviak, parakari
- Middle East: torshi, boza
- Europe: sourdough bread, elderberry wine, kombucha, pickling, rakfisk, sauerkraut, pickled cucumber, surströmming, mead, kvass, salami, sucuk, prosciutto, cultured milk products such as quark, kefir, filmjölk, crème fraîche, smetana, skyr, rakı, tupí, żur.
- Oceania: poi, kānga pirau

== Fermented foods by type ==
=== Beans ===
Cheonggukjang, doenjang, douchi, fermented bean curd, miso, natto, soy sauce, stinky tofu, tempeh, oncom, soybean paste, Beijing mung bean milk, kinama, iru, thua nao

=== Grain ===
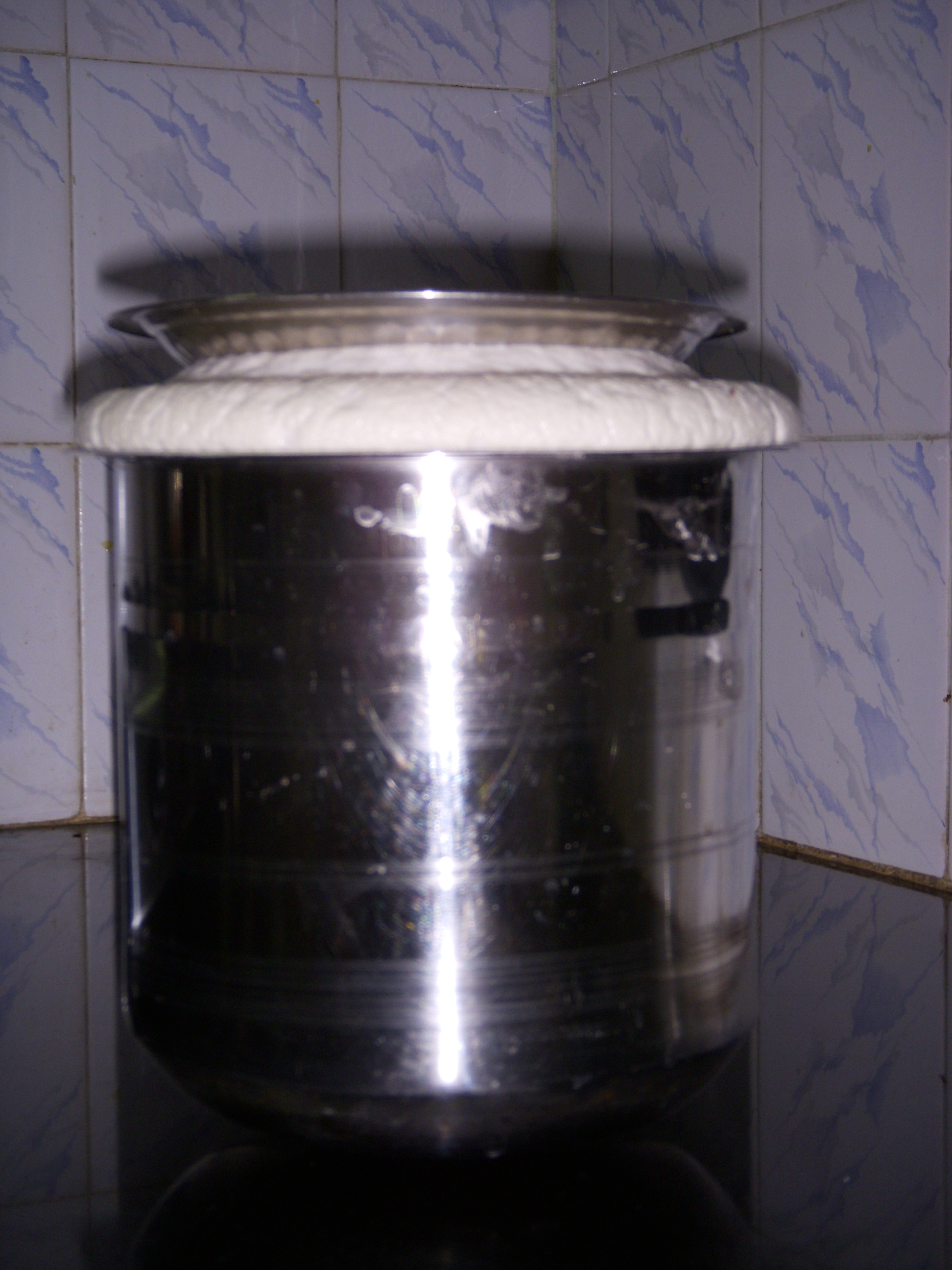
Batter made from rice and lentil (Vigna mungo) prepared and fermented for baking idlis and dosas

Amazake, beer, bread, choujiu, gamju, injera, kvass, makgeolli, murri, ogi, rejuvelac, sake, sikhye, sourdough, sowans, rice wine, malt whisky, grain whisky, idli, dosa, Bangla (drink), vodka, boza, and chicha, among others.

=== Vegetables ===
Kimchi, mixed pickle, sauerkraut, Indian pickle, gundruk, tursu

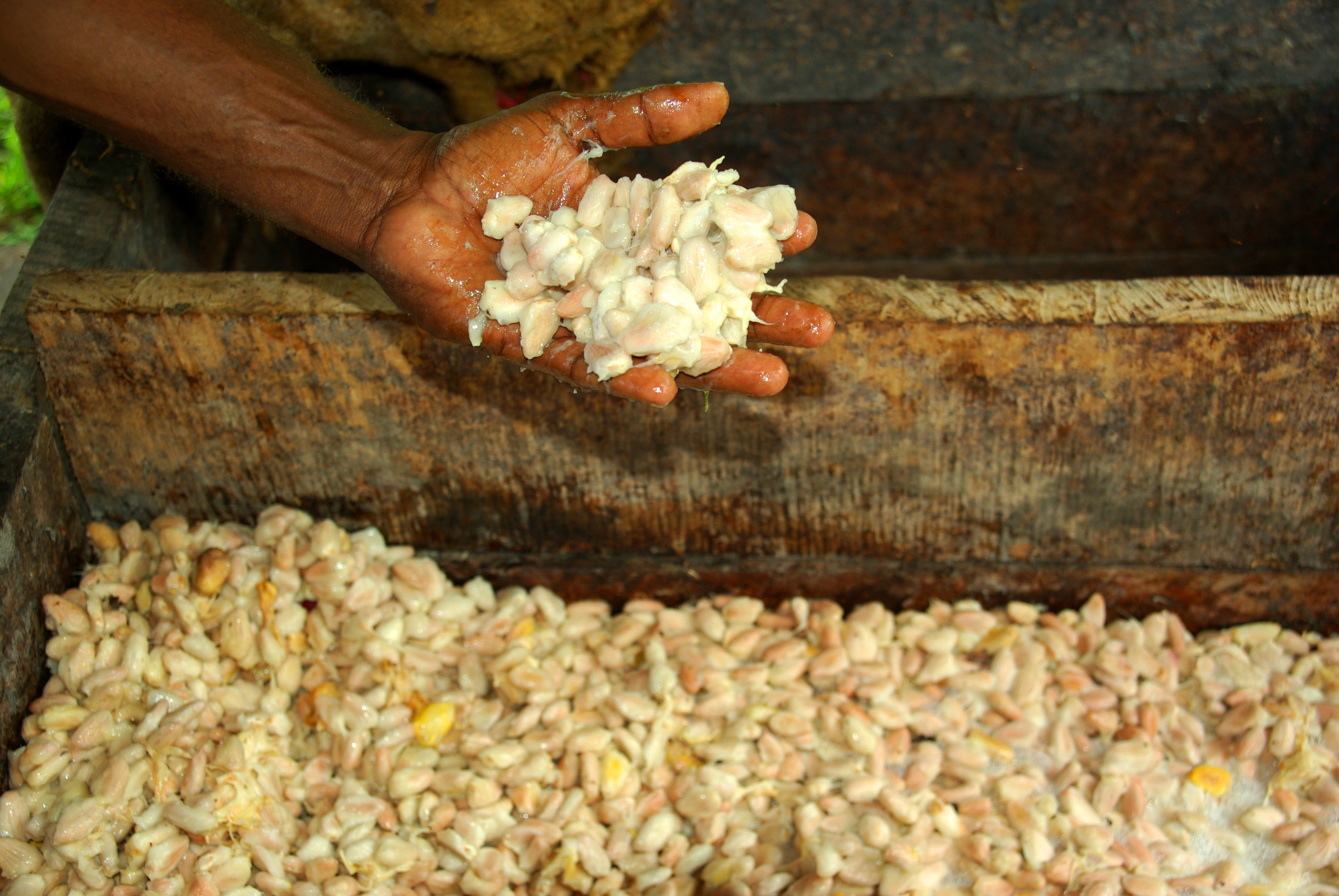
Fermenting cocoa beans

=== Fruit ===
Wine, vinegar, cider, perry, brandy, atchara, nata de coco, burong mangga, asinan, pickling, vişinată, chocolate, rakı, aragh sagi, chacha, tempoyak

=== Honey ===
Mead, metheglin, tej

=== Dairy ===
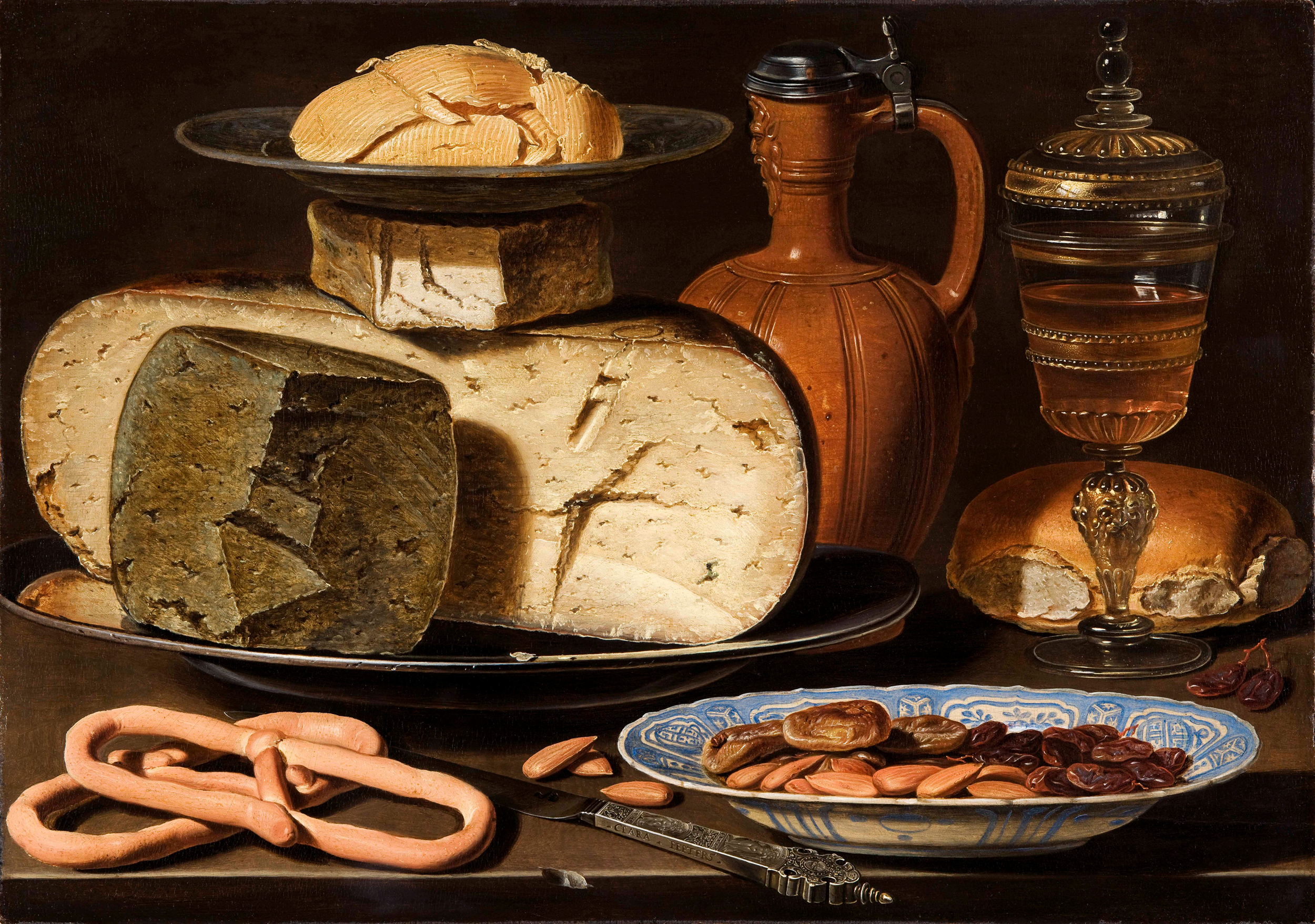
Cheeses in art: Still Life with Cheeses, Almonds and Pretzels, Clara Peeters, c. 1615

Some kinds of cheese also, kefir, kumis (mare milk), shubat (camel milk), ayran, cultured milk products such as quark, filmjölk, crème fraîche, smetana, skyr, and yogurt

=== Fish ===
Bagoong, faseekh, fish sauce, Garum, Hákarl, jeotgal, ngapi, padaek, pla ra, prahok, rakfisk, shrimp paste, surströmming, shidal

=== Meat ===
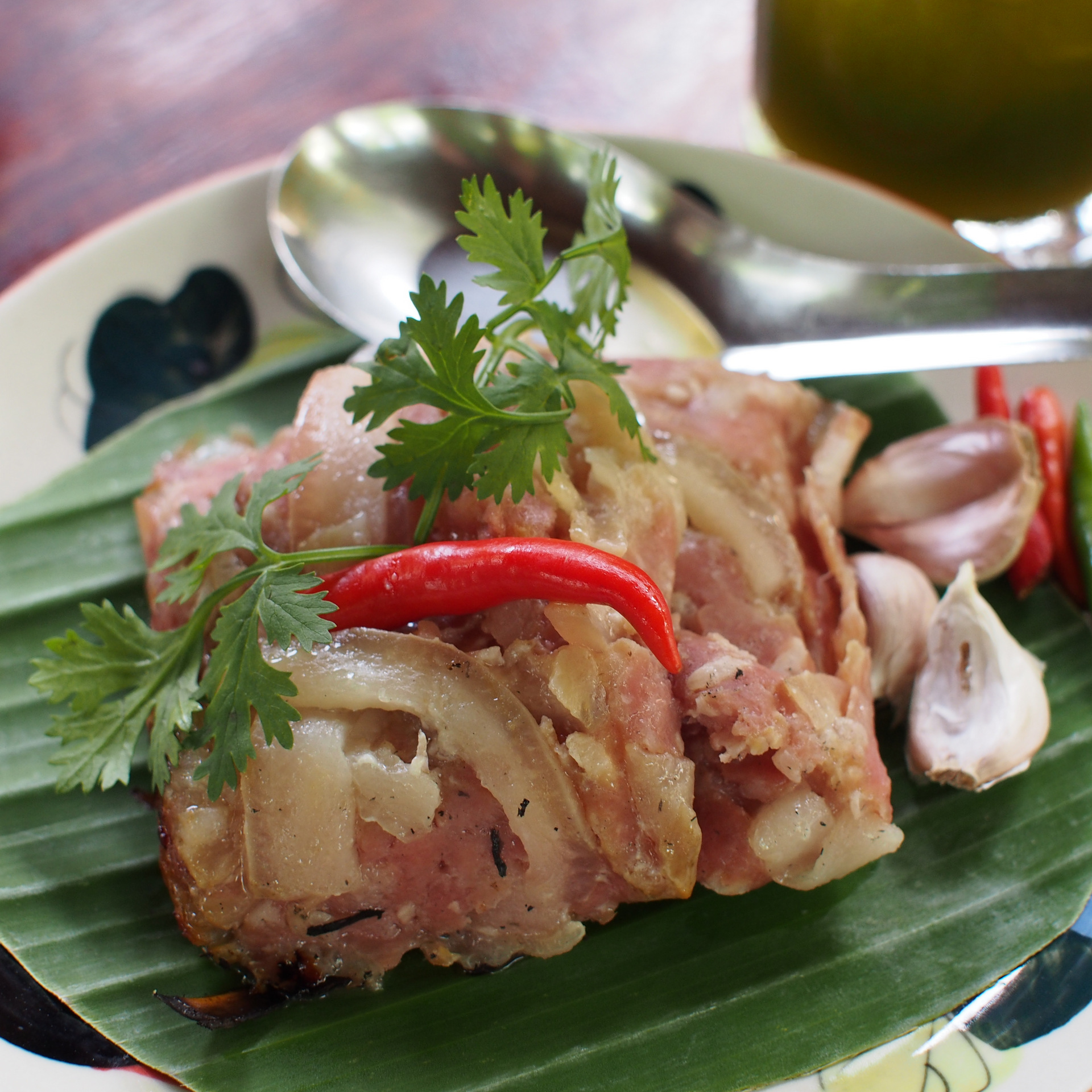
Chin som mok is a northern Thai speciality made with grilled, banana leaf-wrapped pork (both skin and meat) that has been fermented with glutinous rice.

Chorizo, salami, sucuk, pepperoni, nem chua, som moo, saucisson, fermented sausage

=== Tea ===
Pu-erh tea, Kombucha, Lahpet, Goishicha

== Risks ==
Sterilization is an important factor to consider during the fermentation of foods. Failing to completely remove any microbes from equipment and storing vessels may result in the multiplication of harmful organisms within the ferment, potentially increasing the risks of food borne illnesses such as botulism. However, botulism in vegetable ferments is only possible when not properly canned. The production of off smells and discoloration may be indications that harmful bacteria may have been introduced to the food.

Alaska has witnessed a steady increase of cases of botulism since 1985. It has more cases of botulism than any other state in the United States of America. This is caused by the traditional Alaska Native practice of allowing animal products such as whole fish, fish heads, walrus, sea lion, and whale flippers, beaver tails, seal oil, and birds, to ferment for an extended period of time before being consumed. The risk is exacerbated when a plastic container is used for this purpose instead of the old-fashioned, traditional method, a grass-lined hole, as the Clostridium botulinum bacteria thrive in the anaerobic conditions created by the air-tight enclosure in plastic.

Research has found that fermented food contains a carcinogenic by-product, ethyl carbamate (urethane). "A 2009 review of the existing studies conducted across Asia concluded that regularly eating pickled vegetables roughly doubles a person's risk for esophageal squamous cell carcinoma."

== See also ==
- Bletting – Process of softening that certain fleshy fruits undergo, beyond ripening
- Brining
- Corn smut – Fungal plant disease on maize and teosinte
- Curing (food preservation)
- Fermentation in winemaking – Wine making process
- Fermentation lock – Device used in production of fermented beverages
- Food microbiology – Study of the microorganisms that inhabit, create, or contaminate food
- Industrial fermentation – Biochemical process applied in industrial production
- Industrial microbiology – Branch of biotechnology
- Lactic acid bacteria – Order of bacteria
- Lactic acid fermentation – Series of interconnected biochemical reactions
- Pickling
- Symbiotic fermentation
- Yeast in winemaking – Yeasts used for alcoholic fermentation of wine
