= A Strangeness in My Mind =

2014 novel by Orhan Pamuk

- First edition (Turkish)
- Author: Orhan Pamuk
- Original title: Kafamda Bir Tuhaflık
- Translator: Ekin Oklap
- Language: Turkish
- Publisher: Yapi Kredi Yayinlari
- Publication date: 2014
- Publication place: Turkey
- English publication date: 2015
- Media type: Print (hardback & paperback)
- Pages: 480 pp. (original Turkish)
- ISBN: 978-9750830884

A Strangeness in My Mind (Turkish: Kafamda Bir Tuhaflık) is a 2014 novel by Orhan Pamuk. It is the author's ninth novel. Knopf Doubleday published the English translation by Ekin Oklap in the U.S., while Faber & Faber published the English version in the UK.

The story takes place in Istanbul, documenting the changes that the city underwent from 1969 to 2012. The main character is Mevlut, who originates from central Anatolia and arrives as a 12-year-old boy; the course of the novel tracks his adolescence and adulthood. Mevlut gets married in 1982, and finds a lack of success in making money.

Elena Seymenliyska of The Daily Telegraph described the book as "a family saga that is as much an elegy to Istanbul as to its generations of adopted residents." Publishers Weekly stated that "what really stands out is Pamuk's treatment of Istanbul's evolution into a noisy, corrupt, and modernized city." Kirkus Reviews states that the author "celebrates the city’s vibrant traditional culture—and mourns its passing".

The novel is almost 600 pages long. Dwight Garner of The New York Times wrote that the book has "the stretch of an epic but not the impact of one."

== Characters ==
- Mevlut Karatas – Mevlut was born in Konya Province in 1957 and moves to Istanbul at age 12, during the summer of 1969. Early in the novel he attends Atatürk Boys' Secondary School, and he sells yogurt and boza. Kirkus Reviews describes him as a "nice guy" type person. One character describes Mevlut as "a bit of a weirdo, but he's got a heart of gold."
- Rayiha – Mevlut ends up marrying Rayiha even though, in the course of writing love letters to her, he thought he was writing to her younger sister; it turns out the younger sister is named Samiha, but he chooses to marry her anyway and they have a happy relationship.
- Süleyman – Mevlut's cousin, he tricks him into writing letters to Rayha instead of Samiha, because Süleyman wants Samiha.
- Korkut – Another cousin of Mevlut. Kirkus Reviews describes him as an "odious right-wing" person who "treats his wife like a servant".
- Mustafa – Mevlut's father

== Style ==
According to Garner the author was able to write "alert, humane, nonwonky prose" as a result of researching varied topics.

Seymenliyska stated that the novel uses the same voice regardless of which of the characters are speaking. Sometimes characters speak directly to the reader. Dwight Garner wrote that the narrators "contradict one another as if they were talking heads in an early Spike Lee movie."

According to Garner, the 2015 English version has humor that "flows freely" and was "lucidly translated".

== Reception ==
Seymenliyska rated the story four of five stars.

Garner stated that the author had done a good job with research, but while Garner "was not deeply, viscerally bored" with the novel he "mostly turned its pages with polite interest rather than real desire."

Kirkus Reviews stated "Rich, complex, and pulsing with urban life: one of this gifted writer's best." Kirkus named it as one of the "Best Fiction Books of 2015".

The book was shortlisted for the 2017 International Dublin Literary Award and the 2016 International Booker Prize.
