= Richard Polenberg =

American historian (1937–2020)

- Born: Richard D. Polenberg; July 21, 1937; Ithaca, New York, U.S.
- Died: November 26, 2020 (aged 83); Ithaca, New York, U.S.

Academic background
- Education: Brooklyn College; Columbia University
- Doctoral advisor: William E. Leuchtenburg

Academic work
- Discipline: History
- Sub-discipline: American history
- Institutions: Cornell University
- Doctoral students: Kevin M. Kruse

Richard Polenberg (July 21, 1937 – November 26, 2020) was an American historian.

== Background ==
Richard Polenberg was born in Ithaca, New York, on July 21, 1937. He received his Bachelor of Arts degree from Brooklyn College and his Doctor of Philosophy degree from Columbia University, the latter supervised by William E. Leuchtenburg.

== Career ==
Polenberg taught history at Cornell University for 45 years, from 1966 to 2011; In 1986, he became Goldwin Smith Professor of American History. After retiring, he became the Marie Underhill Noll Professor of History Emeritus. In retirement, he also taught in the Auburn Correctional Facility as a part of the Cornell prison education program.

== Death ==
Polenberg died at his home in Ithaca, New York, on November 26, 2020, at the age of 83.

== Legacy ==
Former student Tom Allen wrote of Polenberg:

In 1981, sitting in the fourth row at cavernous Bailey Hall, I watched the masterful Professor Polenberg pace the stage for about one hour telling compelling stories from American history in the mid-20th century. His lectures were so interesting and so fluid that it was hard to take proper notes and absorb his unique storytelling powers at the same time.
Alger Hiss. The Rosenbergs. Roy Cohn. JFK. Lyndon Johnson's civil rights victories.
This parade of American history leapt off the stage and in his mellifluous style, Polenberg riveted over 1000 students in the auditorium.

== Awards ==
- Clark Distinguished Teaching Award from Cornell University
- Silver Gavel Award from the American Bar Association for Fighting Faiths
- Outstanding Book Award from the Gustavus Myers Foundation for Fighting Faiths
- Fulbright Visiting Professor at Hebrew University in Jerusalem

== Works ==
Polenberg published several works during this period, the majority concerning the 20th-century US.

== Selected works ==
- Reorganizing Roosevelt's Government, 1936–1939 (1966)
- War and Society: The United States, 1941–1945 (1972)
- One Nation Divisible: Class, Race, and Ethnicity in the United States Since 1938 (1980)
- Fighting Faiths: The Abrams Case, the Supreme Court, and Free Speech (1989)
- The World of Benjamin Cardozo: Personal Values and the Judicial Process (1997)
- Hear My Sad Story: The True Tales That Inspired "Stagolee," "John Henry," and Other Traditional American Folk Songs (2015)
