= Henry Steele Commager =

American historian (1902–1998)

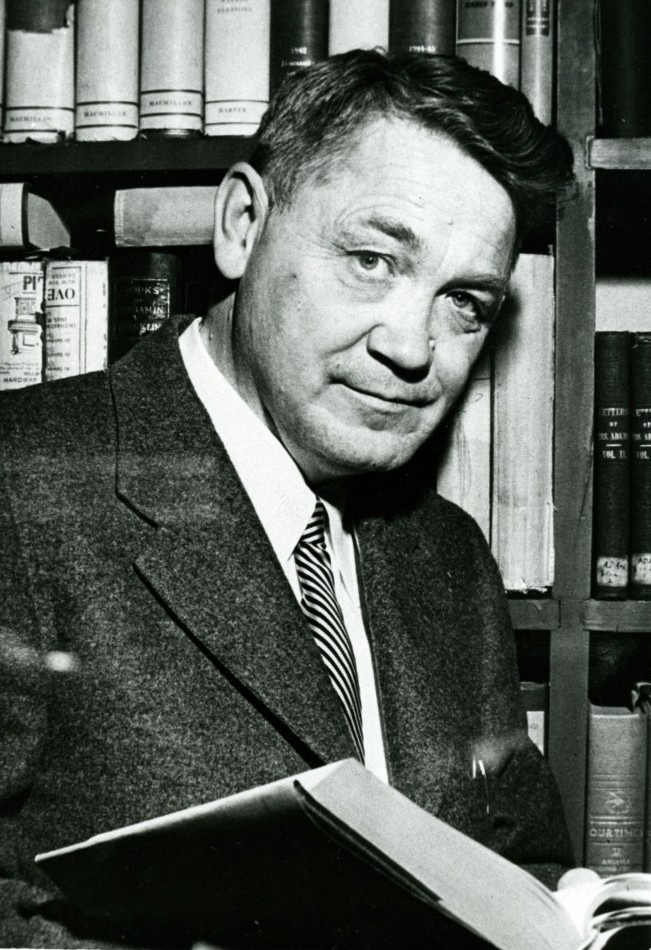
- Commager, c. 1954
- Born: Henry Irving Commager; October 25, 1902; Pittsburgh, Pennsylvania, U.S.
- Died: March 2, 1998 (aged 95); Amherst, Massachusetts, U.S.
- Spouses: Evan Carroll (m. 1928; died 1968); Mary Powlesland (m. 1979)

Academic background
- Education: University of Chicago (BPhil, MA, PhD)
- Thesis: Struensee and the Reform Movement in Denmark (1928)
- Influences: Andrew C. McLaughlin; Vernon Louis Parrington

Academic work
- Discipline: History
- Sub-discipline: American; cultural; intellectual; Danish
- Institutions: New York University; Columbia University; Amherst College
- Doctoral students: Harold Hyman; William E. Leuchtenburg; Leonard W. Levy
- Notable works: Documents of American History (1938–1988); The American Mind (1950); Empire of Reason (1977)
- Influenced: R. B. Bernstein

Henry Steele Commager (October 25, 1902 – March 2, 1998) was an American historian. As one of the most active and prolific liberal intellectuals of his time, with 40 books and 700 essays and reviews, he helped define modern liberalism in the United States.

In the 1940s and 1950s, Commager was noted for his campaigns against McCarthyism and other abuses of government power. With his Columbia University colleague Allan Nevins, Commager helped to organize academic support for Adlai E. Stevenson in 1952 and 1956, and John F. Kennedy in 1960. He opposed the Vietnam War and was an outspoken critic of presidents Lyndon B. Johnson, Richard Nixon, and Ronald Reagan and what he viewed as their abuses of presidential power.

His principal scholarly works were his 1936 biography of Theodore Parker; his intellectual history The American Mind: An Interpretation of American Thought and Character Since the 1880s (1950), which focuses on the evolution of liberalism in the American political mind from the 1880s to the 1940s, and his intellectual history Empire of Reason: How Europe Imagined and America Realized the Enlightenment (1977). In addition, he edited a widely used compilation, Documents of American History; ten editions were published between 1938 and 1988, the last coedited with Commager's former student, Milton Cantor.

== Background ==
Commager was born Henry Irving Commager on October 25, 1902, in Pittsburgh, Pennsylvania, the son of James Williams and Anne Elizabeth (Dan) Commager. After his mother died when he was ten, he was raised by his maternal grandfather in Chicago, Illinois. He attended the University of Chicago and earned degrees in history: Bachelor of Philosophy (1923), Master of Arts (1924), and Doctor of Philosophy (1928). He lived in Copenhagen for a year researching his dissertation on the political reform movement in Denmark led by Johann Friedrich Struensee.

Commager married Evan Alexa Carroll (died 1968) of South Carolina in 1928. The couple had three children: Henry Steele Commager Jr. (1932–1984), known as Steele Commager, who became a classicist at Columbia University and wrote one of the leading books on the Roman poet Horace; Elizabeth Carroll Commager; and Nellie Thomas McColl Commager (now Nell Lasch, wife of the historian Christopher Lasch). Evan Commager wrote several books, including Cousins, Tenth Birthday, Beaux, and Valentine.

In 1979, Commager married Mary Powlesland, a professor in Latin American studies, in Linton, England.

Commager died of pneumonia at the age of ninety-five on March 2, 1998, in Amherst.

== Career ==
Commager originally studied Danish history, and wrote his PhD dissertation on the Danish philosopher Johann Friedrich Struensee, a major reformer during the Enlightenment. Under the influence of his mentor at Chicago, the constitutional historian Andrew C. McLaughlin, Commager shifted his research and teaching interests to American history. Another of his mentors was the colonial American historian Marcus W. Jernegan, for whom he later co-edited a festschrift (with William T. Hutchison), The Marcus W. Jernegan Essays in American Historiography (Chicago: University of Chicago Press, 1937).

Henry Steele Commager

Commager taught at New York University from 1926 to 1939, at Columbia University from 1939 to 1956, and at Amherst College in Massachusetts from 1956 to 1992. He retired in 1992 from the John Woodruff Simpson Lectureship, and died, aged 95, in Amherst, Massachusetts. Commager emphasized to his generations of students that historians must write not only for one another but for a wider audience.

Commager's first solo book was his 1936 biography Theodore Parker: Yankee Crusader, a life of the Unitarian minister, transcendentalist, reformer, and abolitionist Theodore Parker; it was reissued in 1960, along with a volume edited by Commager collecting the best known of Parker's many writings. Two characteristic books were his 1950 intellectual history The American Mind: An Interpretation of American Character Thought Since the 1880s and his 1977 study The Empire of Reason: How Europe Imagined and America Realized the Enlightenment.

Commager was principally an intellectual and cultural historian; he was influenced by the literary historian Vernon L. Parrington, but also worked in the fields of constitutional and political history. His work on this subject includes his 1943 series of controversial lectures, Majority Rule and Minority Rights, which argued for a curtailed scope for judicial review, pointing out on the history of the US Supreme Court's uses of judicial review to strike down economic regulatory legislation in the first decades of the twentieth century. Later, Commager espoused the use of judicial review by the Supreme Court under the leadership of Chief Justice Earl Warren to protect racial and religious minorities from discrimination and to safeguard individual liberties as protected by the Bill of Rights and the Fourteenth Amendment.

== Textbooks and editing ==
Commager was coauthor, with Samuel Eliot Morison, of the widely used history text The Growth of the American Republic (1930; 1937; 1942; 1950, 1962; 1969; 7th ed., with William E. Leuchtenburg, 1980; abridged editions in 1980 and 1983 under the title Concise History of the American Republic). His anthology, Documents of American History (1938), reaching its tenth edition (co-edited with his former student Milton Cantor) in 1988, half a century after its first appearance, remains a standard collection work of primary sources. His two documentary histories, The Blue and the Gray and The Spirit of Seventy-Six (the latter co-edited with his longtime friend and Columbia colleague Richard B. Morris), are comprehensive collections of primary sources on the Civil War and the American Revolution as seen by participants.

With Richard B. Morris, he also co-edited the highly influential New American Nation Series, a multi-volume collaborative history of the United States under whose aegis appeared many significant and prize-winning works of historical scholarship. (This series was a successor to the American Nation series planned and edited at the beginning of the twentieth century by the Harvard historian Albert Bushnell Hart.)

At Columbia, Commager mentored a series of distinguished historians who earned their PhD degrees under his tutelage, including Harold Hyman, Leonard W. Levy, and William E. Leuchtenburg. They joined together in 1967 to present him with a festschrift, or commemorative collection of essays, dedicated to him, titled Freedom and Reform (New York: Harper & Row, 1967). When he moved to Amherst, an elite undergraduate college, he no longer mentored PhD candidates, but he mentored undergraduates, including R. B. Bernstein, who later became a historian of the U.S. Constitution and a specialist in the era of the American Revolution.

=== Liberalism ===
Commager felt a duty as a professional historian to reach out to his fellow citizens. He believed that an educated public that understands American history would support liberal programs, especially internationalism and the New Deal of Franklin D. Roosevelt. Although he was skilled at scholarly research and analysis, he preferred to devise and expound sweeping interpretations of historical events and processes, while also making available primary sources so that people could study history for themselves. Commager was representative of a generation of like-minded historians widely read by the general public, including Samuel Eliot Morison, Allan Nevins, Richard Hofstadter, Arthur Schlesinger Jr., and C. Vann Woodward. Commager's biographer Neil Jumonville has argued that this style of influential public history has been lost in the 21st century, because political correctness has rejected Commager's open marketplace of tough ideas. Jumonville says history now features abstruse deconstruction by experts, with statistics instead of stories, and is comprehensible now only to the initiated, with ethnocentrism ruling in place of common identity.

Commager was a liberal interpreter of the Constitution and Bill of Rights, which he understood as creating a powerful general government that at the same time recognized a wide spectrum of individual rights and liberties. Commager opposed McCarthyism in the 1940s and 1950s, the war in Vietnam (on constitutional grounds), and what he saw as the rampant illegalities and unconstitutionalities perpetrated by the administrations of Richard Nixon and Ronald Reagan. One favorite cause was his campaign to point out that, because the budget of the Central Intelligence Agency is classified, it violates the requirement of Article One of the Constitution that no moneys can be spent by the federal government except those specifically appropriated by Congress.

=== Essays ===
Commager wrote hundreds of essays and opinion pieces on history or presenting a historical perspective on current issues for popular magazines and newspapers. He collected many of the best of these articles and essays in such books as Freedom, Loyalty, Dissent; The Search for a Usable Past and Other Essays in Historiography; Freedom and Order: A Commentary on the American Political Scene; The Commonwealth of Learning; The Defeat of America: War, Presidential Power and the National Character; and Jefferson, Nationalism, and the Enlightenment. He often was interviewed on television news programs and public-affairs documentaries to provide historical perspective on such events as the Apollo 11 Moon landing and the Watergate crisis. Benjamin W. Cramer states:

Commager's lifelong advocacy of intellectual freedom, popular knowledge, and the historical interpretation of contemporary issues has had long-lasting influence on scholars and public advocates, though over the years his politics has been seen as either too liberal or too conservative by various detractors. He is ranked among such other great historians of his time as Arthur Schlesinger, Jr., Allan Nevins, Richard Hofstadter, and Samuel Eliot Morrison [sic].

=== Civil rights ===
Although at first Commager was not deeply concerned with race, he became an advocate for civil rights for African Americans, as he was for other groups. In 1949 he fought to allow the African-American historian John Hope Franklin to present a paper at the Southern Historical Association and agreed to introduce him to the group. In 1953 the NAACP Legal Defense Fund asked Commager for advice for their argument before the Supreme Court for the case of Brown v. Board of Education, but at the time he was not persuaded that this litigation would succeed on historical grounds, and so advised the lawyers.

=== Declaration of Interdependence ===
In 1975 Commager wrote a Declaration of Interdependence, and presented it to the World Affairs Councils of Philadelphia on October 24, 1975. It was signed in a ceremonial signing on January 30, 1976, at Congress Hall, Independence National Historical Park, Philadelphia, by several members of Congress. It was also "endorsed" by a number of non-governmental organizations and United Nations specialized agencies.

The document stressed the importance of international law, conservation of natural resources, disarmament, the world's oceans, and the peaceful exploration of outer space, among other things.

When drafting the document Commager was assisted by an "Advisory Committee" including Raymond Aron, Herbert Agar, Leonard Woodcock, Archibald MacLeish, and others.

== Criticism ==
Commager and his co-author Samuel Eliot Morison received vigorous criticism from African-American intellectuals and other scholars for their popular textbook The Growth of the American Republic, first published in 1930. (Although Morison was responsible for the textbook's controversial section on slavery and references to the slave as "Sambo", and Commager was the junior member of the writing team when the book was first published and always deferred to Morison's greater age and academic stature, Commager has not been spared from charges of racism in this matter.) The textbook was attacked for its uncritical depiction of slavery in America and its depiction of African-American life after emancipation and during Reconstruction. The original editions of the textbook published between 1930 and 1942 echoed the thesis of American Negro Slavery (1918) by Ulrich Bonnell Phillips and the scholarship of William Archibald Dunning, relying on the one-sided personal records of slaveowners and portraying slavery as a mainly benign institution. As the historian Herbert Gutman said, this scholarship focused on the question: "What did slavery do for the slave?" Its answer was that slavery lifted the slaves out of the barbarism of Africa, Christianized them, protected them, and generally benefited them. In 1944, the NAACP launched criticism of the textbook; by 1950, under pressure from students and younger colleagues, Morison, denying any racist intent (he noted that his daughter had been married to Joel Elias Spingarn, a former President of the NAACP), reluctantly agreed to most of the demanded changes. Morison refused, however, to remove repeated references to the anti-abolitionist caricature of "Sambo", which he claimed were vital in understanding the racist nature of American culture in the late 19th and early 20th centuries, an era when even the most enlightened progressive thinkers routinely explained many aspects of human behavior as being a result of innate racial or ethnic characteristics.

August A. Meier, a young professor at a black southern college, Tougaloo College, and a former student of Commager, corresponded with Morison and Commager at the time, in an effort to get them to change their textbook; he reported that Morison "just didn't get it" and in particular did not understand the negative effects that the Sambo stereotype was having on young impressionable students. On the other hand, Meier found that Commager, although at first woefully unaware of black history, was openminded on the subject and willing to learn and change. Morison did not agree to remove Sambo until the fifth edition, which appeared in 1962.

On June 22, 1953, Whittaker Chambers, an intellectual leader on the right, ridiculed Commager as suffering "the liberal neurosis" for stating that America is suffering repression "more violent, more reckless, more dangerous than any in our history."

== Selected publications ==
- Oxford History of the United States (New York: Oxford University Press, 1930). 7th ed.: The Growth of the American Republic (1980) (with Samuel Eliot Morison). Revised and abridged edition: A Concise History of the American Republic (Oxford University Press, 1980; rev. 1983) (with Samuel Eliot Morison and William E. Leuchtenburg)
- Documents of American History (1934 and later editions through 1988)
- Theodore Parker: Yankee Crusader (1936)
- The Heritage of America: Readings in American History for High Schools (1939) (with Allan Nevins)
- Commager, Henry Steele (1943). Majority Rule And Minority Rights (1st ed.). New York: Oxford University Press.(1943)
- The Pocket History of the Second World War, Published by Pocket Books (#338). (November 1945)
- The American Mind: An Interpretation of American Thought and Character Since the 1880s (1950)
- The Blue and the Gray: The Story of the Civil War as Told by Participants (1950)
- Freedom, Loyalty, Dissent (1954)
- The Standard Building of Our Nation (1955) (with Eugene Barker and Walter Prescott Webb)
- The Spirit of Seventy-six: The Story of The American Revolution as Told by Participants (1958) - two volumes
- The Search for a Usable Past and Other Essays in Historiography (1965)
- Freedom and Order: A Commentary on the American Political Scene (1966)
- The Defeat of America: War, Presidential Power, and the National Character (1974)
- Jefferson, Nationalism, and the Enlightenment (1975)
- The Empire of Reason: How Europe Imagined and America Realized the Enlightenment (Garden City, NY: Anchor Press / Doubleday, 1977, and later reprintings)
- Commager on Tocqueville (Columbia: University of Missouri Press, 1993)

== See also ==
- Herbert Baxter Adams Prize

Religious titles
Preceded by T. V. Smith	Ware Lecturer; 1952	Succeeded by Howard Mumford Jones
Academic offices
Vacant Title last held by Dexter Perkins	Pitt Professor of American; History and Institutions; 1947–1948	Succeeded by Roy Franklin Nichols
Preceded by Lawrence H. Gipson	Harold Vyvyan Harmsworth; Professor of American History; 1952	Succeeded by Ray Allen Billington
Awards
Preceded by Arthur M. Schlesinger Jr.	American Academy of Arts and Letters; Gold Medal in History; 1972	Succeeded by Barbara W. Tuchman
Preceded by Richard B. Morris	Bruce Catton Prize; 1990	Succeeded by Edmund Morgan
