= Mageu =

Traditional Southern African non-alcoholic maize drink

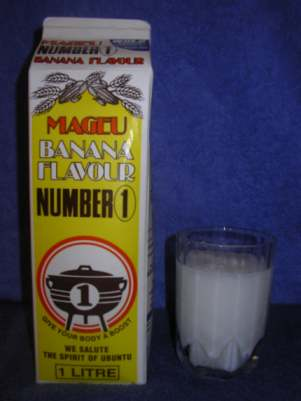
- A carton of mageu, with some poured into a glass.
- Type: Beverage
- Region or state: Southern Africa
- Main ingredients: Fermented mielie pap, wheat flour

Mageu (Setswana spelling), Mahewu (Shona/Chewa/Nyanja spelling), Mahleu (Sesotho spelling), Magau (xau-Namibia) (Khoikhoi spelling), Madleke (Tsonga spelling), Mabundu (Tshivenda spelling), maHewu, amaRhewu (Xhosa spelling) or amaHewu (Zulu and Northern Ndebele spelling) is a traditional Southern African non-alcoholic drink among many of the Chewa/Nyanja, Shona, Ndebele, Nama Khoikhoi and Damara people, Sotho people, Tswana people and Nguni people made from fermented mealie pap. Home production is still widely practised, but the drink is also available at many supermarkets, being produced at factories. Its taste is derived predominantly from the lactic acid that is produced during fermentation, but commercial mageu is often flavoured and sweetened, much in the way commercially available yogurt is. Similar beverages are also made in other parts of Africa.

== Fermentation process ==
Thin mealie pap (maize meal) is prepared, to which wheat flour is added, providing the inoculum of lactate-producing bacteria. The mixture is left to ferment, typically in a warm area. Pasteurisation is done in commercial operations to extend shelf-life.

== Nutrition ==
Nutritionally, it is similar to its parent mealie meal, but with the glucose metabolized to lactate during fermentation. Commercial preparations are often enriched (In South Africa, the term 'fortification' is only allowed legally for specific, government-sanctioned nutrition programs, e.g. that of bread) with vitamins and minerals. Although typically considered non-alcoholic, very small amounts (less than 1%) of ethanol have been reported.

== See also ==
- Boza
- Ogi
- Tejuino
