= Ecology Action =

American non-profit organization

Ecology Action is a non-profit environmental organization and consultancy founded in 1970 under Internal Revenue Code Section 501(c)(3) in Berkeley, California. The organization has since moved its headquarters to Santa Cruz, California, with satellite offices in San Jose, California, and Sacramento, California, where it employs approximately 100 people and operates a variety of energy saving, water, waste reduction, and greenhouse gas emission reduction programs. The organization assists businesses, governments, and utilities in designing and implementing programs in efficient energy use, water conservation, and sustainable transportation.

== History ==
Ecology Action was launched on Earth Day in 1970 as an all-volunteer, unmanned recycling donation depot for bottles and cans. Forty years later, the organization has become a leader in California’s sustainability program design and development with active programs focused on driving behavior change in water conservation, energy management, and alternative transportation.

The organization persevered through the conservative backlash of the 1980s—when the state froze over half a million dollars of their grant contracts—and the Great Recession of 2007–2009. Despite these setbacks, Ecology Action’s sustainability programs have helped over 20,000 California residents and business owners save millions of gallons of water and reduce energy consumption by half a million kilowatt hours each year.

In 2009, the organization began to renovate the former Santa Cruz Sentinel newspaper building with two other partners. The organization also sponsors Bike To Work Week, inviting over ten thousand students and adults to bike to school and/or their places of work twice a year.
