= Boza =

Fermented grain-based beverage

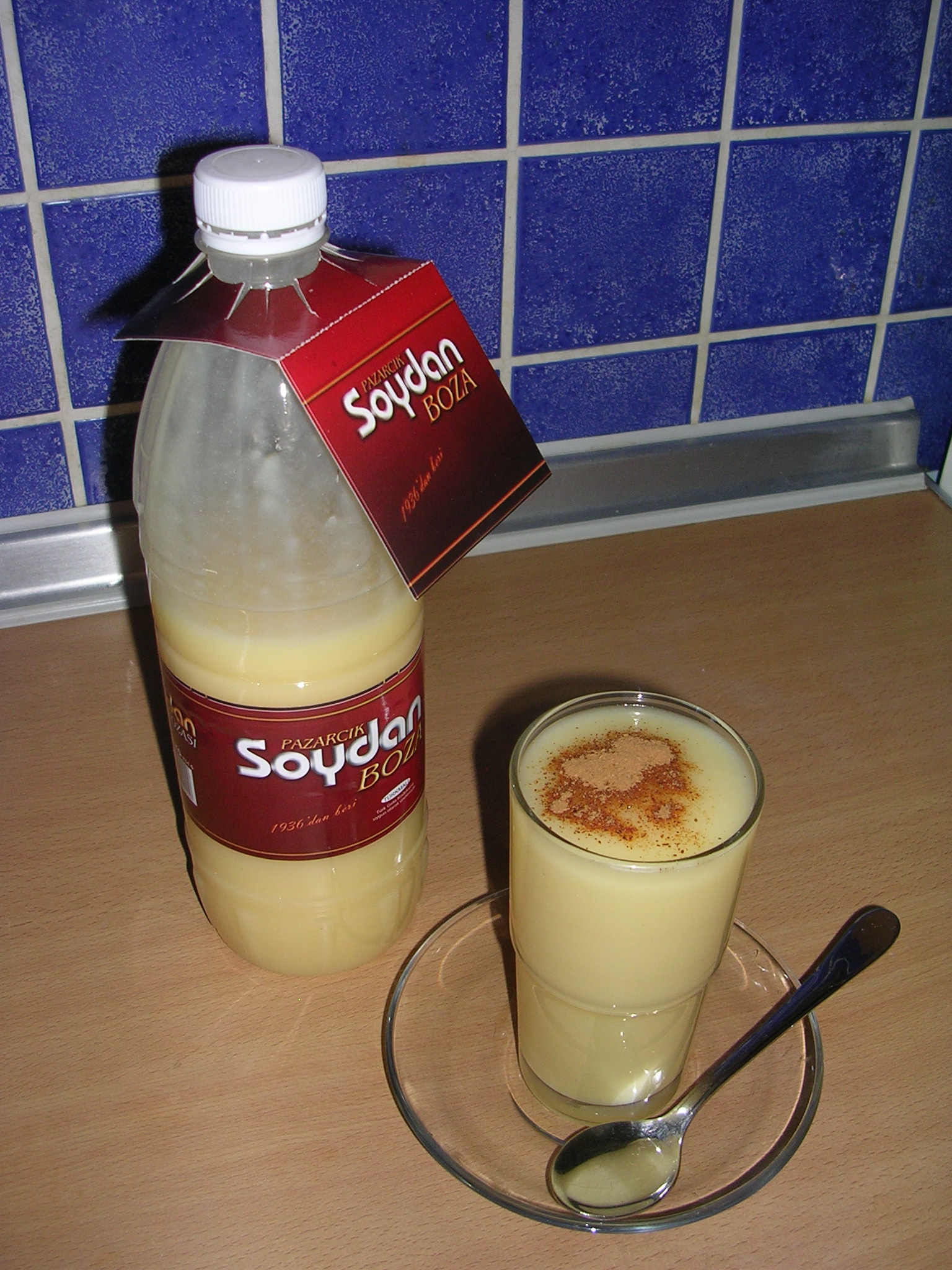
Boza from Turkey

Boza, also bosa or bozo, is a fermented beverage originating from Central Asia. It is one of the oldest Turkic beverages. It is made in Turkey, Albania, Bulgaria, Bosnia and Herzegovina, Hungary, North Macedonia, Romania, Serbia, the Volga region, the Caucasus, and North Africa. It is a malt drink made by fermenting various grains: millet, wheat (or bulgur) and maize (corn) in Turkey. It has a thick consistency, a low alcohol content (around 1%), and a slightly acidic sweet flavor.

== Etymology ==
According to Turkish etymological dictionary Nişanyan Sözlük, boza is etymologically Turkic in origin. The dictionary states that Old Turkic buχsı or buχsum are cognates, yet it is unclear from which language it was ultimately derived and which one took it as a loanword. Ármin Vámbéry says it is an ancient Turkish word found in Kutadgu Bilig.

The oldest written account of the drink is under the name buχsum and is attested from the 1073 Middle Turkic dictionary Dīwān Lughāt al-Turk by Mahmud al-Kashgari. Modern Turkish word boza is believed to be cognates with the Old Turkic buχsı or buχsum. The drink under the name boza is first attested in Abu Hayyan al-Gharnati's early 14th century Kipchak Turkic work Kitab al-'idrak li-lisan al-'atrak

== History ==
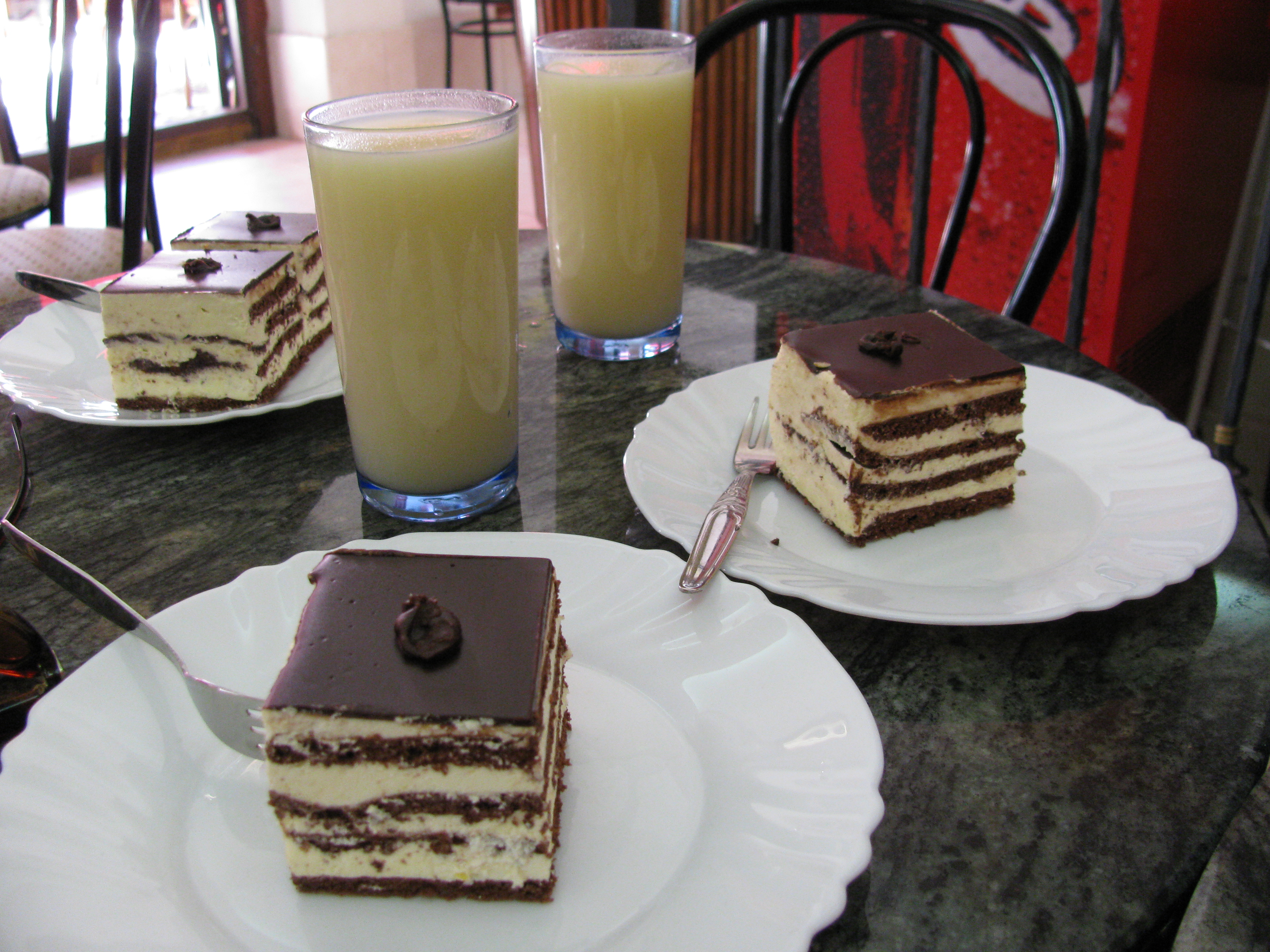
Boza and Boem šnita desserts in Sarajevo, Bosnia and Herzegovina

Fermented cereal flour (generally millet) drinks have been produced in Anatolia and Mesopotamia since the 9th or 8th millennia BCE, and Xenophon mentioned in the 4th century BCE how the locals preserved and cooled the preparations in earthen pots that were buried. There are references mentioning boza-like "fermented (ground) millet drink" in Akkadian and Sumerian texts; the beverage is said to be respectively arsikku and ar-zig. In the 10th century CE, the drink was called Boza and became common amongst Central Asian Turkic peoples. Later it spread to the Caucasus and the Balkans. It enjoyed its golden age under the Ottomans, and boza-making became a common trade in towns and cities.

Until the 16th century, boza was drunk freely everywhere, but the custom of making the so-called Tartar boza laced with opium brought the wrath of the authorities down on the drink, and it was prohibited by sultan Selim II (1566–1574). He describes a type of non-alcoholic sweet boza of a milk white color usually made by Albanians.

In the 17th century, Sultan Mehmed IV (1648–1687) prohibited alcoholic drinks including boza, and closed down all the boza shops. This prohibition would be reinforced and then loosened several times in the history of the empire. The 17th century Turkish traveler Evliya Çelebi reports that boza was widely drunk at this time, and that there were 300 boza shops employing over a thousand people in Istanbul alone.

In this period, boza was widely drunk by the Janissaries in the army. It contained only a low level of alcohol, so as long as it was not consumed in sufficient quantities to cause drunkenness, it was tolerated as a warming and strengthening beverage for soldiers. As Evliya Çelebi explained in the first volume ("Istanbul") of his Seyahatname (Travelogues), "These boza makers are numerous in the army. To drink sufficient boza to cause intoxication is sinful but, unlike wine, in small quantities it is not condemned." In the 19th century, the sweet and non-alcoholic boza preferred at the Ottoman palace became increasingly popular, while the sour and alcoholic type of boza went out of style. In 1876, brothers Haci Ibrahim and Haci Sadik established a boza shop in the Istanbul district of Vefa, close to the then center of entertainment, Direklerarası. This boza, with its thick consistency and tart flavor, became famous throughout the city. It is the only boza shop dating from that period still in business today, and is now run by the founders' great-great-grandchildren.

In the 1910s, boza also reached Białystok in Poland, where it was introduced by Bulgarian immigrants, and is now designated a local traditional beverage by the Ministry of Agriculture and Rural Development of Poland.

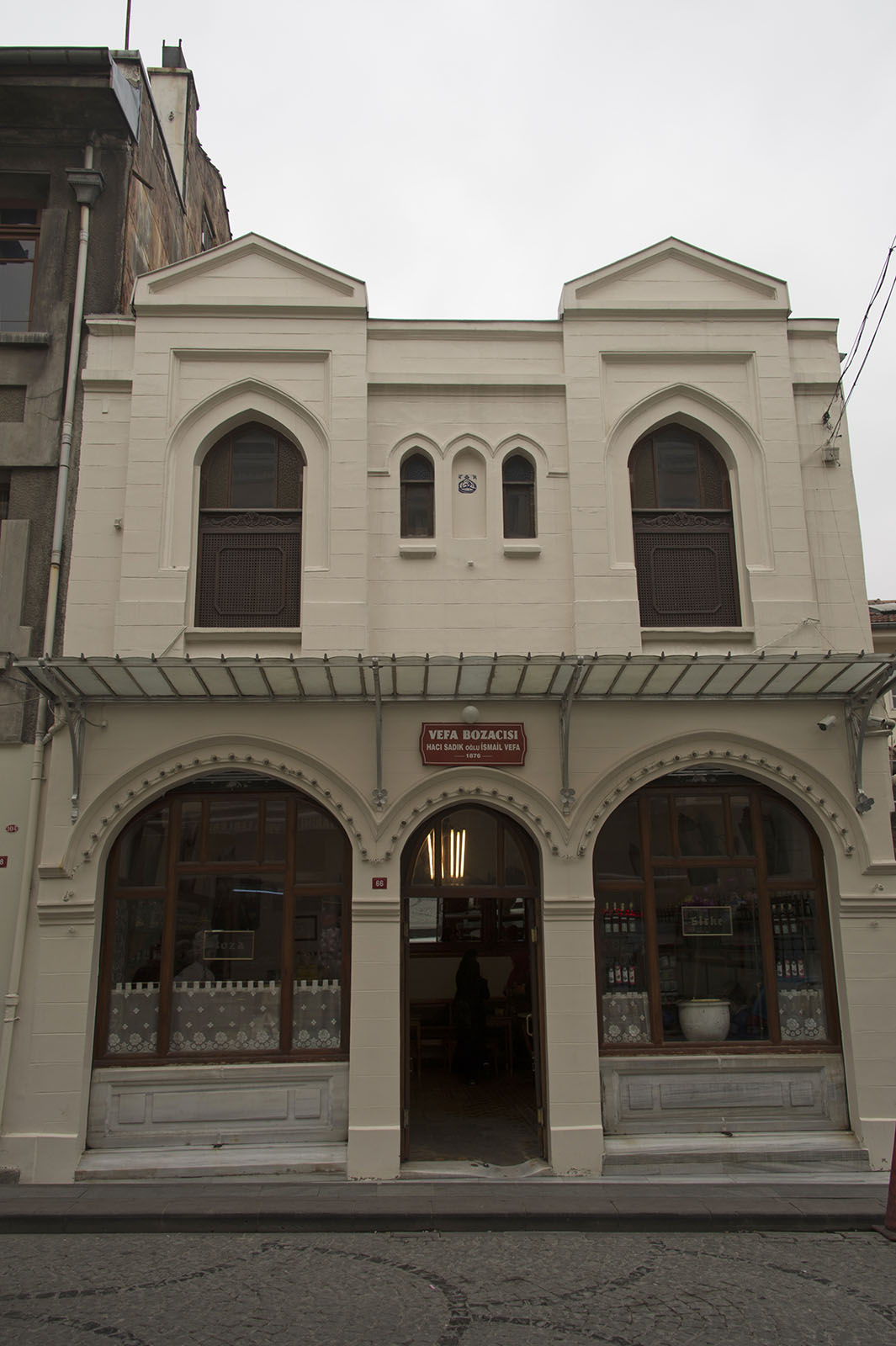
Istanbul Vefa Bozaci Shop from across street

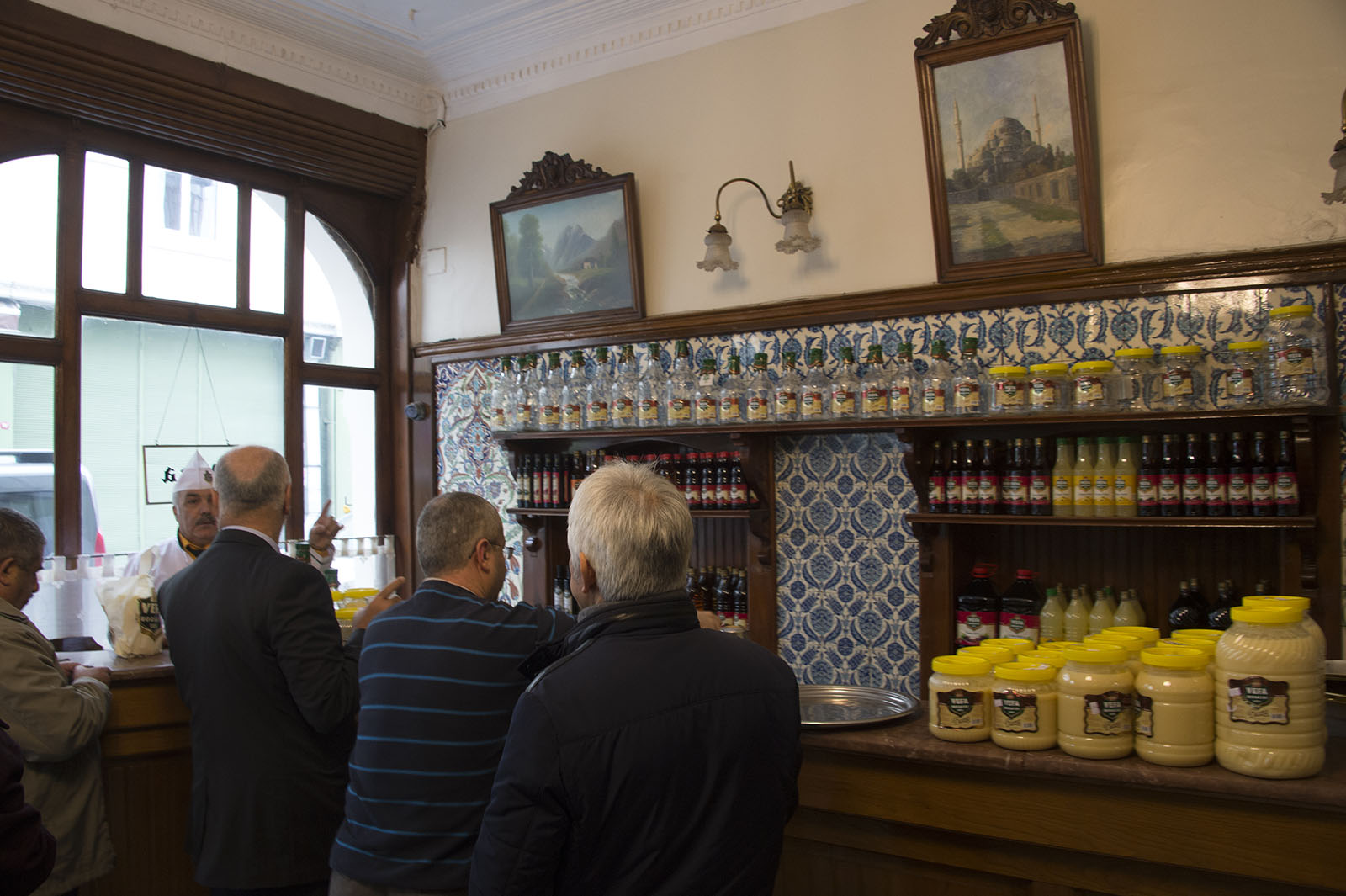
Istanbul Vefa Bozaci distribution area

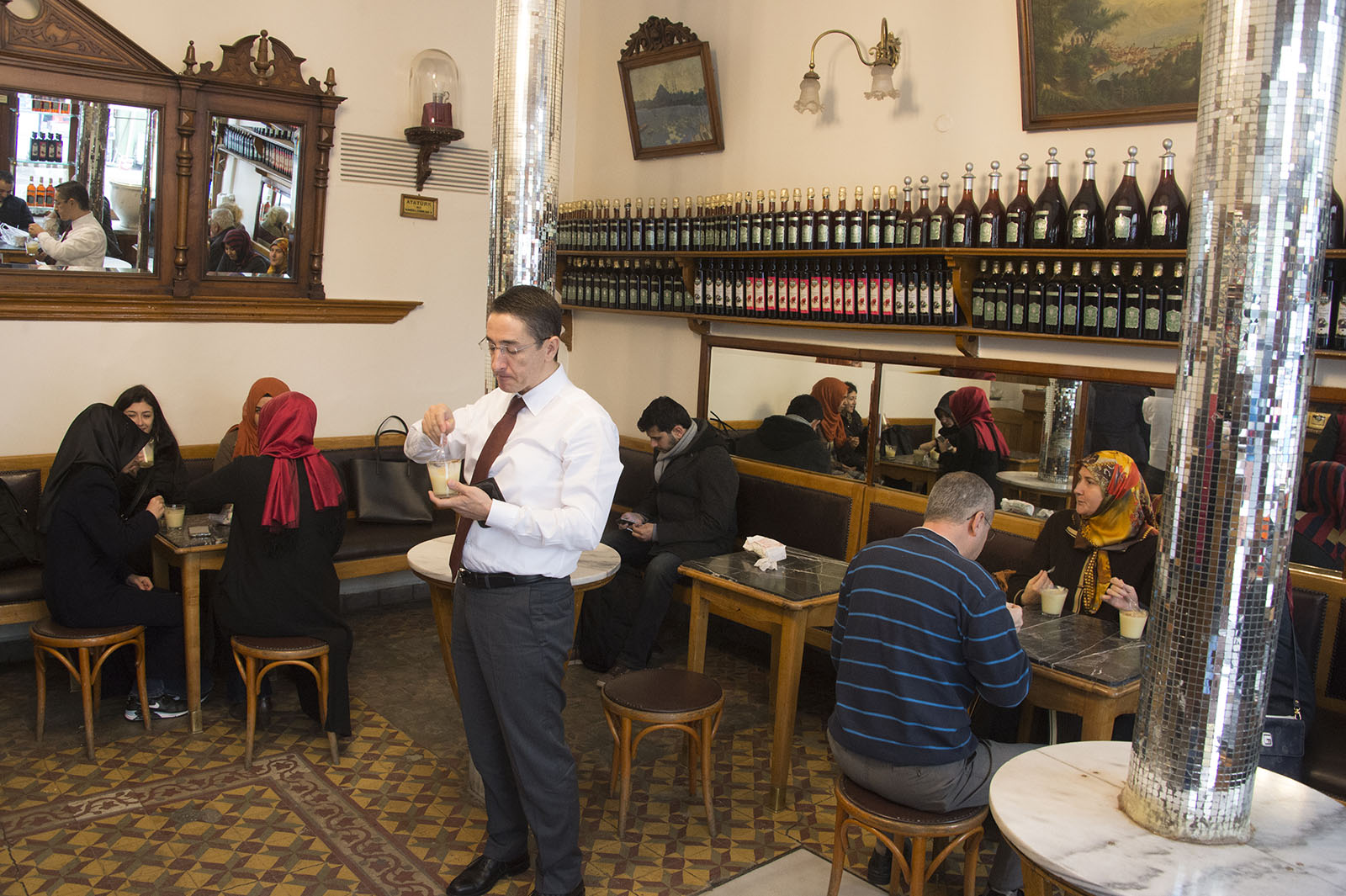
Istanbul Vefa Bozaci Consumption area

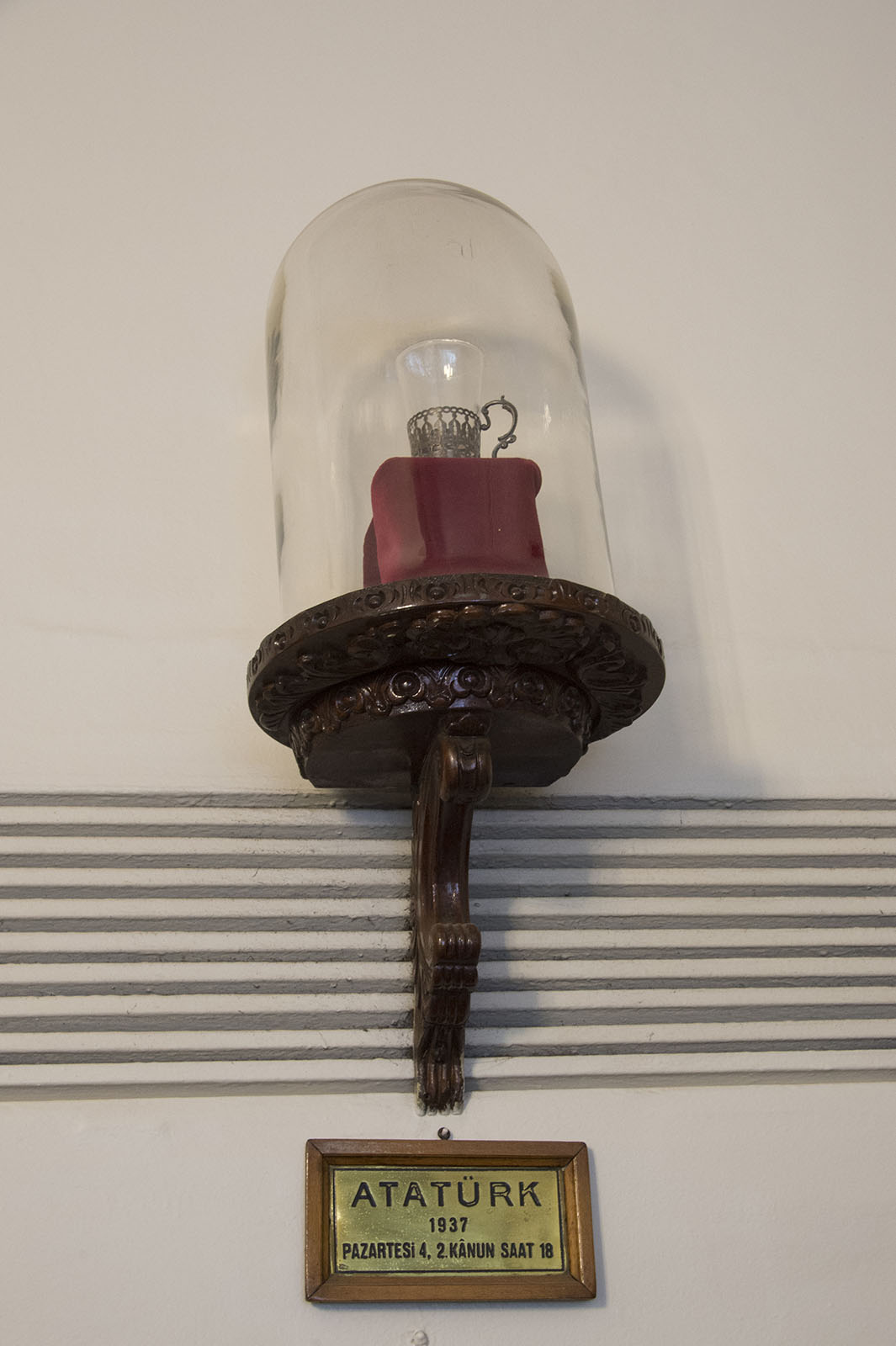
Istanbul Vefa Bozaci Glass used by Atatürk

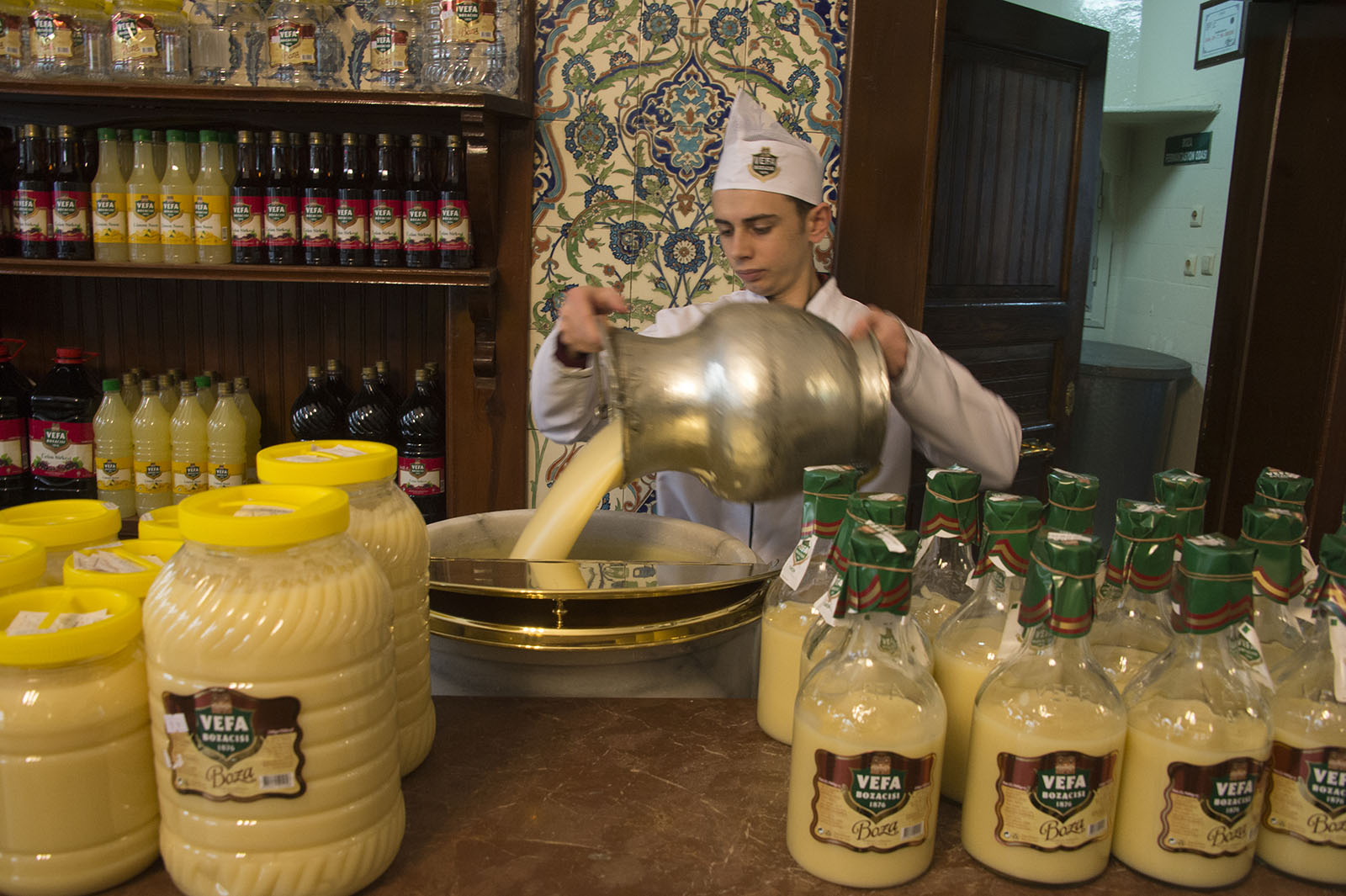
Istanbul Vefa Bozaci Transfer to smaller vessel

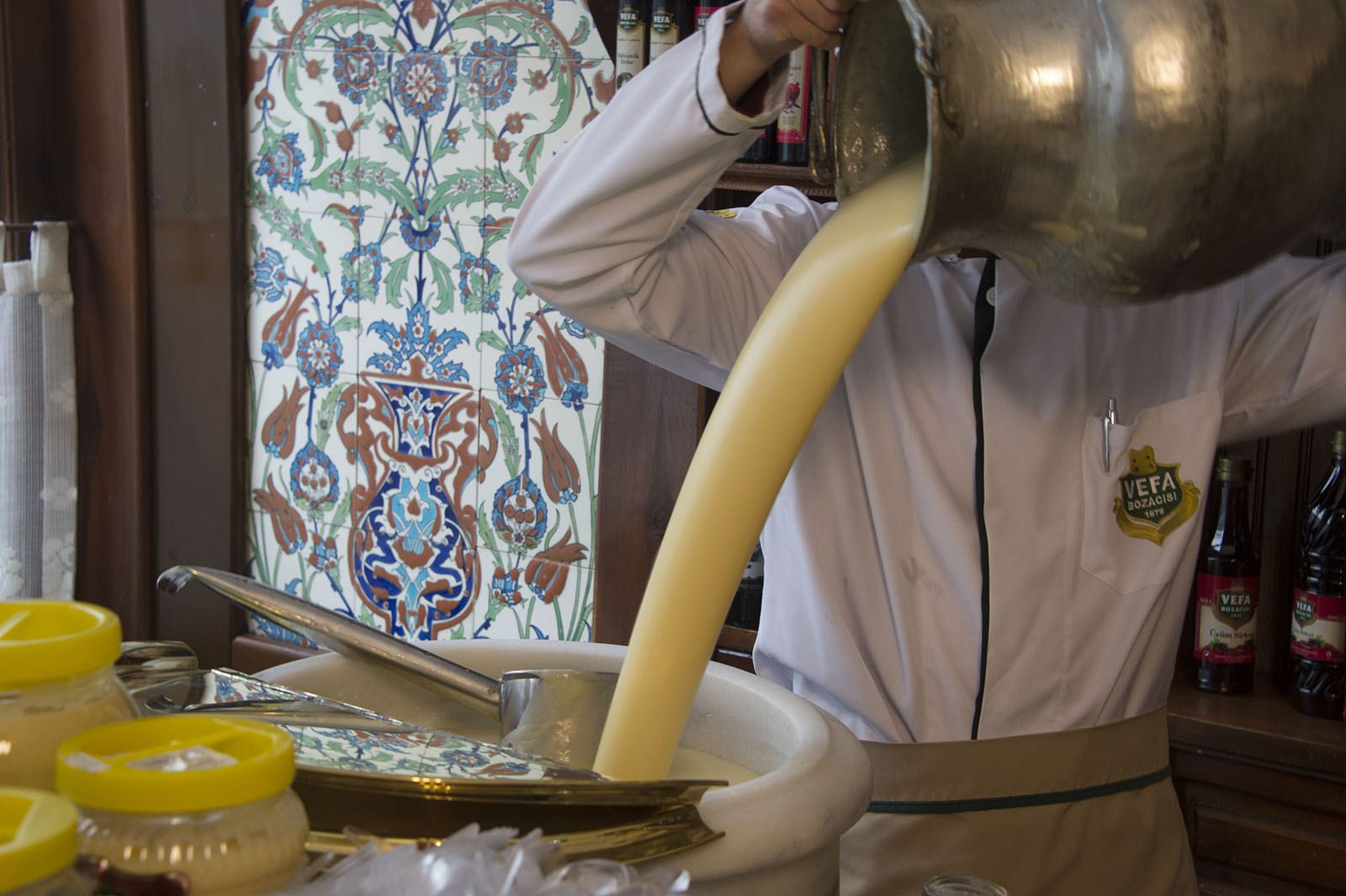
Istanbul Vefa Bozaci Transfer to smaller vessel

== Production and storage ==
Boza is produced in the Balkans, notably Bulgaria and most of the Turkic regions, but not always using millet. The flavour varies according to the cereal which is used. Measuring boza samples made from maize, wheat, and rice flours, researchers determined an average of 12.3% total sugar, 1.06% protein, and 0.07% fat. The boza in Białystok, Poland is made from millet groats, with the addition of raisins, lemon and sugar.

Boza spoils if not kept in a cool place, therefore boza fermenters in Turkey did not sell boza during the hot summer traditionally, instead selling alternative beverages such as grape juice or lemonade. They produce it in the summer now due to increased availability of refrigeration, and revenue from high demand. Serbia, Montenegro, Bosnia and Herzegovina, Kosovo, Bulgaria, Albania, and Macedonia produce boza as a refreshing beverage year-round.

== In popular culture ==
- Mevlut Karataş, the main character in Orhan Pamuk's 2014 novel A Strangeness in My Mind (Kafamda Bir Tuhaflık), is a boza vendor.

== Similar beverages ==
Other beverages from around the world that are traditionally low-alcohol and lacto-fermented include:

- Kvass
- Bragă
- Chicha
- Ibwatu
- Mageu
- Makgeolli
- Oshikundu
- Toddy
- Tejuino
- Tongba
