= Richard B. Morris =

American historian

- Born: Richard Brandon Morris; July 24, 1904; New York City, U.S.
- Died: March 3, 1989 (aged 84); New York City, U.S.
- Education: City College of New York (BA); Columbia University (MA, PhD)
- Spouse: Berenice Robinson
- Children: 4 sons

Richard Brandon Morris (July 24, 1904 – March 3, 1989) was an American historian best known for his pioneering work in colonial American legal history and the early history of American labor. In later years, he shifted his research interests to the constitutional, diplomatic, and political history of the American Revolution and the making of the United States Constitution.

== Early life and education ==
Morris was born on July 24, 1904, in New York City. He attended high school at Townsend Harris Hall in New York City. In 1924, he received a BA degree from City College. In 1925, he received an MA from Columbia University, and in 1930 he received a PhD in history at the university with Evarts Boutell Greene as his dissertation advisor. Morris' dissertation, published by Columbia University Press as Studies in the History of American Law, with Special Reference to the Seventeenth and Eighteenth Centuries (1930), still defines the research agenda for historians working on early American law, though at the time it attracted bitter denunciations from law school practitioners of legal historym, including Julius Goebel Jr. and Karl Llewellyn, both then Columbia Law School faculty members.

== Career ==
=== City College of New York ===
In 1927, Morris began teaching history at the City College of New York. In 1946, after publishing Government and Labor in Early America, he was named to the faculty of Columbia University.

=== Columbia University ===
In 1949, Morris left City College to teach at Columbia University. Eventually, he became Gouverneur Morris Professor of History at Columbia (no relation), Richard B. Morris continued his pioneering research and writing.

Morris was privately opposed to the Columbia University protests of 1968 and the agenda of the radicals, but made no public statements on the matter. After some of his books were stolen while his office was occupied during the protests, he sought employment elsewhere to no avail.

=== Project '87 ===
In 1976, following the general scholarly disappointment with the bicentennial of the American Revolution, Morris, then president of the American Historical Association, joined with James MacGregor Burns, then president of the American Political Science Association, to found Project Project '87, a joint effort to mark the bicentennial of the U.S. Constitution. Project '87 brought together historians, political scientists, and legal scholars and managed to salvage the Constitution's bicentennial as an occasion for the publication of groundbreaking new historical and legal scholarship on the Constitution and its origins. Morris's own contribution to the Bicentennial, and the culmination of his life's work as a historian, was The Forging of the Union, 1781–1789, his 1987 volume for the New American Nation series.

== Personal life and death ==
In 1930, Morris married the author and composer Berenice Robinson; they had two sons, Jeffrey B. Morris, a constitutional and legal historian who teaches at the Touro Law School in New York, and Donald R. Morris, a teacher in Wyoming.

Morris died age 84 in New York City of melanoma.

== Works ==
Columbia University colleague Henry Steele Commager enlisted Morris as co-editor of the influential New American Nation series, a collaborative history of the United States published by Harper & Row. In 1966 he won the Bancroft Prize in History for his book on the diplomacy of the American Revolution, The Peacemakers: The Great Powers and American Independence (1965). This project, and the acquisition by Columbia University of the papers of John Jay, led him into one of his most productive scholarly ventures. Two volumes of an unfinished four-volume edition of the previously unpublished papers of John Jay followed (1976, 1980), taking Jay's life from his birth in 1745 to his return to the United States in 1784 to become the Confederation's Secretary for Foreign Affairs. Morris also quarried from his work on Jay a series of lectures in the Gaspar G. Bacon Lecture Series at Boston University, which in 1967 he published as John Jay, the Nation, and the Court, focusing on Jay as a committed nationalist in his work as a diplomat and as the first Chief Justice of the United States. Morris's Phelps Lectures at New York University resulted in his 1966 book The American Revolution Reconsidered, which he followed in 1970 with his The Emerging Nations and the American Revolution. In 1973, preparing for the impending bicentennial of the American Revolution, he published Seven Who Shaped Our Destiny: The Founding Fathers as Revolutionaries, a collection of biographical essays about Benjamin Franklin, George Washington, John Adams, Thomas Jefferson, John Jay, James Madison, and Alexander Hamilton.

- Richard B. Morris, Studies in the Early History of American Law, With Special Reference to the Seventeenth and Eighteenth Centuries (1930, 1959)
- Richard B. Morris, Government and Labor in Early America (1946)
- Richard B. Morris, Encyclopedia of American History (1953 and later editions)
- Richard B. Morris, The Peacemakers: The Great Powers and American Independence (1965)
- Richard B. Morris, The American Revolution Reconsidered (1966)
- Richard B. Morris, John Jay, the Nation, and the Court (1967)
- Richard B. Morris, Fair Trial: Fourteen Who Stood Accused, from Anne Hutchinson to Alger Hiss (1967)
- Richard B. Morris, The Emerging Nations and the American Revolution (1970)
- Richard B. Morris, Seven Who Shaped Our Destiny: The Founding Fathers as Revolutionaries (1973)
- Richard B. Morris, ed., John Jay: Unpublished Papers, 1743–1780 (1976)
- Richard B. Morris, "The American Revolution as an Anti-colonial War" in Conspectus of History (1976)
- Richard B. Morris, ed., John Jay: Unpublished Papers, 1780–1784 (1980)
- Richard B. Morris, Witnesses at the Creation: Hamilton, Madison, Jay and the Constitution (1985)
- Richard B. Morris, The Forging of the Union, 1781–1789 (1987)

== Awards ==
- 1966: Bancroft Prize in History for The Peacemakers: The Great Powers and American Independence
