= Walter Post =

Walter Post may refer to:

- Walter A. Post, mayor of Newport News, Virginia
- Wally Post, American baseball player
- Walter H. Post, postmaster and namesake of Post, Oregon
