= William Desmond =

William Desmond may refer to:

- William Desmond (politician) (died 1941), Irish Cumann na nGaedheal and Fine Gael party politician
- William Desmond (actor) (1878–1949), Irish-born American actor
- William Desmond (philosopher) (born 1951), Irish philosopher
- William D. Desmond (born 1974), Irish philosopher
