= Richard Hofstadter =

American historian and public intellectual (1916–1970)

- Hofstadter c. 1970
- Born: August 6, 1916; Buffalo, New York, U.S.
- Died: October 24, 1970 (aged 54); New York City, New York, U.S.
- Spouses: Felice Swados (m. 1936; died 1945); Beatrice Kevitt (m. 1947)
- Awards: Pulitzer Prize (1956, 1964)

Academic background
- Education: University at Buffalo; Columbia University
- Doctoral advisor: Merle Curti
- Influences: Theodor Adorno; Charles A. Beard; Merle Curti; Charles Darwin; Sigmund Freud; F. Scott Fitzgerald; Seymour Martin Lipset; Karl Mannheim; Karl Marx; H. L. Mencken; C. Wright Mills; Friedrich Nietzsche; Reinhold Niebuhr; Vernon L. Parrington; Julius W. Pratt; Lionel Trilling; Edmund Wilson

Academic work
- Discipline: History
- Sub-discipline: American history
- Institutions: Columbia University
- Doctoral students: Paula S. Fass; Eric Foner; Otis L. Graham; Linda K. Kerber; Lawrence W. Levine; Charles E. Rosenberg; Dorothy Ross
- Notable students: Terence E. Carroll; Stanley Elkins; Herbert Gutman; Richard Heffner; Ira Katznelson; Eric McKitrick; Robert V. Remini; Mike Wallace
- Main interests: History of American political culture
- Notable works: The Age of Reform (1955); Anti-intellectualism in American Life (1963); "The Paranoid Style in American Politics" (1964)
- Influenced: Robert Dallek; Eric Foner; Christopher Hitchens; Susan Jacoby; Christopher Lasch; David W. Noble; David M. Potter; Arthur Schlesinger Jr.; Mike Wallace; C. Vann Woodward; Howard Zinn

Richard Hofstadter (August 6, 1916 – October 24, 1970) was an American historian and public intellectual. Hofstadter was the DeWitt Clinton Professor of American History at Columbia University. Rejecting his earlier historical materialist approach to history, in the 1950s he came closer to the concept of "consensus history", and was epitomized by some of his admirers as the "iconic historian of postwar liberal consensus." Others see in his work an early critique of the one-dimensional society, since he was equally critical of socialist and capitalist models of society, and bemoaned the "consensus" within the society as "bounded by the horizons of property and entrepreneurship", criticizing the "hegemonic liberal capitalist culture running throughout the course of American history".

Hofstadter's books include Social Darwinism in American Thought, 1860–1915 (1944); The American Political Tradition (1948); The Age of Reform (1955); Anti-intellectualism in American Life (1963); and the essays collected in The Paranoid Style in American Politics (1964). He was twice awarded the Pulitzer Prize: in 1956 for The Age of Reform, an analysis of the populism movement in the 1890s and the progressive movement of the early 20th century; and in 1964 for the cultural history Anti-intellectualism in American Life. He was an elected member of the American Academy of Arts and Sciences and the American Philosophical Society.

== Early life and education ==
Hofstadter was born in Buffalo, New York, on August 6, 1916, to a Jewish father, Emil A. Hofstadter, and a German-American Lutheran mother, Katherine (née Hill), who died when Richard was ten. He attended Fosdick-Masten Park High School in Buffalo. Hofstadter then studied philosophy and history at the University at Buffalo, from 1933, under the diplomatic historian Julius W. Pratt.

Hofstadter was raised as an Episcopalian, but later identified more with his Jewish roots. Antisemitism cost him fellowships at Columbia University and attractive professorships. The Buffalo Jewish Hall of Fame lists him as one of the "Jewish Buffalonians who have made a lasting contribution to the world."

In 1936, Hofstadter entered the doctoral program in history at Columbia University, where his advisor Merle Curti was demonstrating how to synthesize intellectual, social, and political history based upon secondary sources rather than primary-source archival research. In 1938, he became a member of the Communist Party USA, but soon became disillusioned by the Stalinist party discipline and show trials. After withdrawing from the party in August 1939 following the Hitler–Stalin Pact, he retained a critical left-wing perspective that was still obvious in American Political Tradition in 1948.

Hofstadter earned his PhD in 1942. In 1944, he published his dissertation, Social Darwinism in American Thought, 1860–1915, a critique of late-19th-century American capitalism and its ruthless "dog-eat-dog" economic competition and Social Darwinian self-justification. Conservative critics, including Robert C. Bannister, disagreed with his critique. The sharpest criticism of the book focused on Hofstadter's weakness as a researcher: "he did little or no research into manuscripts, newspapers, archival, or unpublished sources, relying instead primarily on secondary sources augmented by his lively style and wide-ranging interdisciplinary readings, thereby producing well-written arguments based on scattered evidence he found by reading other historians." The book was commercially successful, selling 200,000 copies.

From 1942 to 1946, Hofstadter taught history at the University of Maryland, where he became a close friend of the popular sociologist C. Wright Mills and read extensively in the fields of sociology and psychology, absorbing ideas of Max Weber, Karl Mannheim, Sigmund Freud, and the Frankfurt School. His later books frequently refer to behavioral concepts such as "status anxiety".

== Career ==
In 1946, Hofstadter joined Columbia University's faculty, and in 1959 he succeeded Allan Nevins as the DeWitt Clinton Professor of American History, where he played a major role in directing Ph.D. dissertations. According to his biographer David Brown, after 1945 Hofstadter philosophically "broke" with Charles A. Beard and moved to the right, becoming leader of the "consensus historians", a term Hofstadter disapproved of, but that was widely applied to his apparent rejection of the Beardian idea that the sole basis for understanding American history is the fundamental conflict between economic classes.

In a widely held revision of this view, Christopher Lasch wrote that, unlike the "consensus historians" of the 1950s, Hofstadter saw the consensus of classes on behalf of business interests not as a strength but "as a form of intellectual bankruptcy and as a reflection, moreover, not of a healthy sense of the practical but of the domination of American political thought by popular mythologies."

In 1948, Hofstadter published American Political Tradition. At a time when he was still viewing politics from a critical left-wing perspective, he rejected black-and-white polarization between pro-business and anti-business politicians. Making explicit reference to Jefferson, Jackson, Lincoln, Cleveland, Bryan, Wilson, and Hoover, Hofstadter made a statement on the consensus in the American political tradition that has been seen as "ironic". He said:

The fierceness of the political struggles has often been misleading: for the range of vision embraced by the primary contestants in the major parties has always been bounded by the horizons of property and enterprise. However much at odds on specific issues, the major political traditions have shared a belief in the rights of property, the philosophy of economic individualism, the value of competition; they have accepted the economic virtues of capitalist culture as necessary qualities of man.

Hofstadter later complained that this remark in a hastily written preface requested by the editor had been the reason for "lumping him" unfairly into the category of "consensus historians" like Boorstin, who celebrated this kind of ideological consensus as an achievement, whereas Hofstadter deplored it. Hofstadter expressed his dislike of the term consensus historian several times, and criticized Boorstin for overusing the consensus and ignoring the essential conflicts in history. In an earlier draft of the preface, he wrote:

American politics has always been an arena in which conflicts of interests have been fought out, compromised, adjusted. Once these interests were sectional; now they tend more clearly to follow class lines; but from the beginning American political parties, instead of representing single sections or classes clearly and forcefully, have been intersectional and interclass parties, embracing a jumble of interests which often have reasons for contesting among themselves.

Hofstadter rejected Beard's interpretation of history as a succession of exclusively economically motivated group conflicts and financial interests of politicians. He thought that most of the periods of US history, except the Civil War, could be fully understood only by taking into account an implicit consensus, shared by all groups across the conflict lines. He criticized the generation of Beard and Vernon Louis Parrington because they had

put such an excessive emphasis on conflict, that an antidote was needed ... It seems to me to be clear that a political society cannot hang together, at all, unless there is some kind of consensus running through it, and yet that no society has such a total consensus as to be devoid of significant conflict. It is all a matter of proportion and emphasis, which is terribly important in history. Of course, obviously, we have had one total failure of consensus, which led to the Civil War. One could use that as the extreme case in which consensus breaks down.

In 1948, he published The American Political Tradition and the Men Who Made It, interpretive studies of 12 major American political leaders from the 18th to the 20th centuries. The book was a critical success and sold nearly a million copies at university campuses, where it was used as a history textbook; critics found it "skeptical, fresh, revisionary, occasionally ironical, without being harsh or merely destructive." Certain titles of the biographical sections illustrate paradoxes: Thomas Jefferson is "The Aristocrat as Democrat"; John C. Calhoun is the "Marx of the Master Class"; and Franklin Roosevelt is "The Patrician as Opportunist". In writing the book, Hofstadter was influenced by literary figures as well as historians: two key influences on him were the critic Edmund Wilson and the novelist F. Scott Fitzgerald. Hofstadter's style was so powerful and engrossing that professors kept assigning the book long after scholars had revised or rejected its main points.

On April 13, 1970, less than a year before his death, Hofstadter wrote historian Bernard Bailyn, expressing concerns about scholarly depictions of recent studies by both of them as "consensus". Bailyn's response has not yet been examined by third-party sources.

As a historian, Hofstadter's groundbreaking work came in using social psychology concepts to explain political history. (Note: He was influenced by his friend sociologist C. Wright Mills.) He explored subconscious motives such as social status anxiety, anti-intellectualism, irrational fear, and paranoia as they propel political discourse and action in politics. Historian Lloyd Gardner wrote that "in later essays Hofstadter specifically ruled out the possibility of a Leninist interpretation of American imperialism."

=== Rural ethos ===
The Age of Reform From Bryan to FDR: Populism, Progressivism, and the New Deal (1955) casts the Populist movement as a manifestation of the yeoman ideal in America's sentimental attachment to agrarianism and the farm's moral superiority to the city. Hofstadter—himself very much a big-city person—noted the agrarian ethos was "a kind of homage that Americans have paid to the fancied innocence of their origins; however, to call it a myth does not imply falsity, because it effectively embodies the rural values of the American people, profoundly influencing their perception of the correct values, hence their political behavior." In this matter, the stress is on the importance of Jefferson's writings, and of his followers, in the development of agrarianism in the US, as establishing the agrarian myth, and its importance, in American life and politics—despite the rural and urban industrialization that rendered the myth moot.

Anti-intellectualism in American Life (1963) and The Paranoid Style in American Politics (1965) describe American provincialism, warning against anti-intellectual fear of the cosmopolitan city, presented as wicked by the xenophobic and anti-Semitic Populists of the 1890s. They trace the direct political and ideological lineage between the Populists and anti-communist Senator Joseph McCarthy and McCarthyism, the political paranoia manifest in his time. Hofstadter's dissertation director Merle Curti wrote that Hofstadter's "position is as biased, by his urban background ... as the work of older historians was biased by their rural background and traditional agrarian sympathies."

=== Irrational fear ===
The Idea of a Party System: The Rise of Legitimate Opposition in the United States, 1780–1840 (1969) describes the origins of the First Party System as reflecting fears that the (other) political party threatened to destroy the republic. The Progressive Historians: Turner, Beard, Parrington (1968) systematically analyzes and criticizes the intellectual foundations and historical validity of Beard's historiography and revealed Hofstadter's increasing inclination toward neoconservatism. Privately, Hofstadter said that Frederick Jackson Turner was no longer a useful guide to history, because he was too obsessed with the frontier and his ideas too often had "a pound of falsehood for every few ounces of truth." (Note: The private letter was written to Merle Curti, probably in 1948.)

Hofstadter's cultural interpretations have been described as repeatedly drawing on concepts from literary criticism ("irony", "paradox", "anomaly"), anthropology ("myth", "tradition", "legend", "folklore"), and social psychology ("projection", "unconsciously", "identity", "anxiety", "paranoid"). He artfully employed their explicit scholarly meanings and their informal prejudicial connotations. His goal, they argue, was "destroying certain cherished American traditions and myths derived from his conviction that they provided no trustworthy guide for action in the present." Thus Hofstadter argued, "The application of depth psychology to politics, chancy though it is, has at least made us acutely aware that politics can be a projective arena for feelings and impulses that are only marginally related to the manifest issues." C. Vann Woodward wrote that Hofstadter seemed "to have a solid understanding, if not a private affection" for "the odd, the warped, the 'zanies' and the crazies of American life—left, right and middle."

== Political views ==
Influenced by his wife, Hofstadter was a member of the Young Communist League USA in college, and in April 1938 he joined the Communist Party USA; he quit in 1939. Hofstadter had been reluctant to join, knowing the orthodoxy it imposed on intellectuals, telling them what to believe and what to write. He was disillusioned by the spectacle of the Moscow Show Trials, but wrote: "I join without enthusiasm but with a sense of obligation [...] my fundamental reason for joining is that I don't like capitalism and want to get rid of it." He remained anti-capitalist, writing, "I hate capitalism and everything that goes with it", but was similarly disillusioned with Stalinism, finding the Soviet Union "essentially undemocratic" and the Communist Party rigid and doctrinaire. In the 1940s, Hofstadter abandoned political causes, feeling that intellectuals were no more likely to "find a comfortable home" under socialism than they were under capitalism.

Biographer Susan Baker writes that Hofstadter "was profoundly influenced by the political Left of the 1930s ... The philosophical impact of Marxism was so intense and direct during Hofstadter's formative years that it formed a major part of his identity crisis ... The impact of these years created his orientation to the American past, accompanied as it was by marriage, establishment of life-style, and choice of profession." Geary concludes that, "To Hofstadter, radicalism always offered more of a critical intellectual stance than a commitment to political activism. Although Hofstadter quickly became disillusioned with the Communist Party, he retained an independent left-wing standpoint well into the 1940s. His first book, Social Darwinism in American Thought (1944), and The American Political Tradition (1948) had a radical point of view."

In the 1940s, Hofstadter cited Beard as "the exciting influence on me". Hofstadter specifically responded to Beard's social-conflict model of U.S. history, which emphasized the struggle among competing economic groups (primarily farmers, Southern slavers, Northern industrialists, and workers) and discounted abstract political rhetoric that rarely translated into action. Beard encouraged historians to search for economic belligerents' hidden self-interest and financial goals. By the 1950s and 1960s, Hofstadter had a strong reputation in liberal circles. Lawrence Cremin wrote that "Hofstadter's central purpose in writing history ... was to reformulate American liberalism so that it might stand more honestly and effectively against attacks from both left and right in a world which had accepted the essential insights of Darwin, Marx, and Freud." Alfred Kazin identified his use of parody: "He was a derisive critic and parodist of every American Utopia and its wild prophets, a natural oppositionist to fashion and its satirist, a creature suspended between gloom and fun, between disdain for the expected and mad parody."

In 2008, conservative commentator George Will called Hofstadter "the iconic public intellectual of liberal condescension" who "dismissed conservatives as victims of character flaws and psychological disorders—a 'paranoid style' of politics rooted in 'status anxiety.' etc. Conservatism rose on a tide of votes cast by people irritated by the liberalism of condescension."

== Later life ==
Angered by the radical politics of the 1960s, and especially by the student occupation and temporary closure of Columbia University in 1968, Hofstadter began to criticize student activist methods. His friend David Herbert Donald said, "as a liberal who criticized the liberal tradition from within, he was appalled by the growing radical, even revolutionary, sentiment that he sensed among his colleagues and his students. He could never share their simplistic, moralistic approach." Brick says he regarded them as "simple-minded, moralistic, ruthless, and destructive." Moreover, he was "extremely critical of student tactics, believing that they were based on irrational romantic ideas, rather than sensible plans for achievable change, that they undermined the unique status of the university, as an institutional bastion of free thought, and that they were bound to provoke a political reaction from the right." Coates argues that his career saw a steady move from left to right, and that his 1968 Columbia commencement address "represented the completion of his conversion to conservatism".

Despite strongly disagreeing with their political methods, he invited his radical students to discuss goals and strategy with him. He even employed one, Mike Wallace, to collaborate with him on American Violence: A Documentary History (1970); Hofstadter student Eric Foner said the book "utterly contradicted the consensus vision of a nation placidly evolving without serious disagreements."

Hofstadter planned to write a three-volume history of American society. At his death, he had only completed the first volume, America at 1750: A Social Portrait (1971).

== Death and legacy ==
Hofstadter died of leukemia on October 24, 1970, at Mount Sinai Hospital in Manhattan, at age 54. He showed more interest in his research than in his teaching. In undergraduate classes, he read aloud the draft of his next book. Hofstadter directed more than 100 finished doctoral dissertations but gave his graduate students only cursory attention; he believed this academic latitude enabled them to find their own models of history. Among them were Herbert Gutman, Eric Foner, Lawrence W. Levine, Linda Kerber, Paula S. Fass, and Dorothy Ross. Some, such as Eric McKitrick and Stanley Elkins, were more conservative than he; Hofstadter had few disciples and founded no school of history writing.

Following Hofstadter's death, Columbia dedicated a locked bookcase of his works in Butler Library to him. When the library's physical conditions deteriorated, his widow Beatrice asked that it be removed.

Columbia University annually awards the Richard Hofstadter Fellowship to an entering graduate student.

== Personal life ==
Hofstadter married Felice Swados (whose brother was Harvey Swados) in 1936, despite both families' opposition, after he and Felice spent several summers at Hunter Colony, New York, which was run by their close friend Margaret Lefranc. The couple had one child, Dan. Felice died in 1945.

Hofstadter married Beatrice Kevitt (1922–2012) in 1947. She taught American history at Brooklyn College in the 1960s. After Hofstadter died, she married the journalist Theodore White.

== Published works ==
- "The Tariff Issue on the Eve of the Civil War," The American Historical Review Vol. 44, No. 1 (Oct. 1938), pp. 50–55 full text in JSTOR
- "William Graham Sumner, Social Darwinist," The New England Quarterly Vol. 14, No. 3 (Sep. 1941), pp. 457–77 online at JSTOR
- "Parrington and the Jeffersonian Tradition," Journal of the History of Ideas Vol. 2, No. 4 (Oct. 1941), pp. 391–400 JSTOR
- "William Leggett, Spokesman of Jacksonian Democracy," Political Science Quarterly Vol. 58, No. 4 (Dec. 1943), pp. 581–94 JSTOR
- Hofstadter, Richard (April 1944), "UB Phillips and The Plantation Legend", The Journal of Negro History, 29 (2): 109–24, doi:10.2307/2715306, JSTOR 2715306, S2CID 150112096.
- Social Darwinism in American Thought, 1860–1915, Philadelphia: University of Pennsylvania Press, 1992 [1944], ISBN 978-0-8070-5503-8; online
- The American Political Tradition and the Men Who Made It (New York: A. A. Knopf, 1948). online
- "Beard and the Constitution: The History of an Idea," American Quarterly (1950) 2#3 pp. 195–213 JSTOR
- The Age of Reform From Bryan to FDR: Populism, Progressivism, and the New Deal (New York: Knopf, 1955).
- The Development of Academic Freedom in the United States (New York: Columbia University Press, 1955) with Walter P. Metzger (1922–2016) OCLC 175391 online:* Hofstadter's contribution was published separately as Academic Freedom in the Age of the College, Columbia University Press, [1955] 1961.
- The United States: the History of a Republic (Englewood Cliffs, NJ: Prentice-Hall, 1957), college textbook; several editions; coauthored with Daniel Aaron and William Miller
- Anti-intellectualism in American Life (New York: Knopf, 1963). online
- The Progressive Movement, 1900–1915 (Englewood Cliffs, NJ: Prentice-Hall, 1963). edited excerpts. OCLC 265628
- Hofstadter, Richard (October 8, 1964). "A Long View: Goldwater in History". New York Review of Books. 3 (4).
- The Paranoid Style in American Politics, and Other Essays (New York: Knopf, 1965). ISBN 978-0-226-34817-9 online
  - includes "The Paranoid Style in American Politics", Harper's Magazine (1964)
- The Progressive Historians: Turner, Beard, Parrington (New York: Knopf, 1968) online.
- The Idea of a Party System: The Rise of Legitimate Opposition in the United States, 1780–1840 (Berkeley: University of California Press, 1969). online
- American Violence: A Documentary History, co-edited with Mike Wallace (1970) ISBN 978-0-394-41486-7
- "America As A Gun Culture" American Heritage, 21 (October 1970), 4–10, 82–85.
- America at 1750: A Social Portrait (1971) ISBN 9780394465890

== See also ==
- John William Ward
