= The Paranoid Style in American Politics =

1964 essay by Richard J. Hofstadter

- The cover of the first book edition, published by Alfred A. Knopf in 1965
- Author: Richard Hofstadter
- Language: English
- Publisher: Harper's Magazine
- Publication date: November 1964
- Publication place: United States
- Pages: 77–86
- Anthology: The Paranoid Style in American Politics, and Other Essays

"The Paranoid Style in American Politics" is an essay by American historian Richard Hofstadter, first published in Harper's Magazine in November 1964. It was the title essay in a book by the author the following year. Published soon after Arizona senator Barry Goldwater won the Republican Party presidential nomination over the more moderate Nelson Rockefeller, Hofstadter's article explores the influence of a particular style of conspiracy theory and "movements of suspicious discontent" throughout American history.

== Background ==
Hofstadter's 1959 BBC radio lecture on "The American Right Wing and the Paranoid Style" was later revised and published as "The Paranoid Style in American Politics" in the November 1964 Harper's Magazine. Hofstadter's initial focus on status anxiety tied to interest politics came from Franz Neumann's "Anxiety and Politics" (1954). Frankfurt School adherent Herbert Marcuse similarly connected status anxiety to interest politics in a eulogy for the deceased Neumann during a memorial service at Columbia University in 1955. Hofstadter shifted to studying the concepts of paranoia in what he termed "pseudo-conservatism", partly based on The Authoritarian Personality (1950) by another Frankfurt School member, Theodor W. Adorno, and admitted in 1967 that the book was an influential study. Hofstadter's 1954 paper on paranoia in pseudo-conservatism was presented at the 1954 Seminar of the State convened by post-industrial sociologist Daniel Bell, a 1950s Cold War liberal and post-1965 neoconservative. The provenance of the phrase "paranoid style" can be traced to the archived correspondence of then-BBC producer George MacBeth in a late January 1959 transmissive proposing the same to Hofstadter. On August 2, 1959, Hofstadter delivered his radio lecture on "The American Right Wing and the Paranoid Style."

Hofstadter subsequently identified the "post-McCarthy Right" with "pseudo-conservatism", jettisoning "status anxiety" and "status politics" in favor of "the paranoid style" and "projective politics." The notion of projective behavior in politics was influenced by Sigmund Freud's reduction of "paranoid" apocalypticism to a "primitive religion" in depth psychoanalysis, as well as Karl Mannheim's conception of worldview as a constellation of symbolic expressions. Both Mannheim and Hofstadter focused on the cognitive style in Baroque art and Mannerism as examples of visual cultures. This "visual universe" advanced a worldview, rather than sociolinguistics and Émile Durkheim's collective representations. In the words of Andrew McKenzie-McHarg, the paranoid style "possessed precisely the requisite elasticity that allowed it to bridge the divide between the poles of the individual and the social (or, expressed somewhat differently, between the disciplines of psychology and sociology) ... the concept of style functions differently because it has the capacity to mediate between both the individual [premised on Weberian ideal types] and supra-individual levels ... Hofstadter's conceptual innovation had the advantage of allowing him to describe the style in which McCarthy had played 'the political game' as paranoid, while reserving judgment on his personal mental state."

The idea of the paranoid style transcended contexts, consequently leaving Hofstadter open to charges of devising both an ahistorical conceptual history and, counterintuitively, a history that emphasized change through linear time. Historian Nicolas Guilot argues that "Hofstadter had done away with Mannheim's sociological attention for the conflicts among social groups that stood behind styles of thought...the subtle line that distinguished the mind that scanned the world for signs of conspiracies from the one that distilled symbols and rhetoric into a dangerous mindset unaffected by the vicissitudes of history had become blurred." As late as 1964, Hofstadter still self-identified as a Cold War liberal. He aimed his November essay in Harper's Magazine at the Barry Goldwater 1964 presidential campaign's conception of libertarianism in the United States.

Hofstadter adapted the essay from a Herbert Spencer lecture he delivered at Oxford University on November 21, 1963. An abridged version was first published in the November 1964 issue of Harper's Magazine, and was published as the titular essay in the book The Paranoid Style in American Politics, and Other Essays (1965).

== Synopsis and themes ==
In developing the subject, Hofstadter initially establishes that his use of the phrase "paranoid style" was a borrowing from the clinical psychiatric term paranoid to describe a political personality, and acknowledges that the term is pejorative. Hofstadter asserts that, throughout American politics, politicians incite fear to sway voters toward a certain viewpoint. He argues that a "political paranoiac" engages in such demagoguery because they cannot accept society and seek to destroy the current order under the guise of a looming threat.

== Historical applications ==
Historians have applied the paranoid category to other political movements, such as the conservative Constitutional Union Party of 1860. Hofstadter's approach was later applied to the rise of new right-wing groups, including the Christian Right and the Patriot Movement. In his book The Intellectuals and McCarthy: The Radical Specter (1967), the political scientist Michael Paul Rogin offered a thorough criticism of Hofstadter's thesis regarding the People's Party of the 1890s, also known as the Populist Party, and similar American progressive groups, showing that the ethnic and religious groups that supported McCarthy and other paranoid-style figures differ from those who supported the Populists and their successors, and thus that the origins of McCarthyism cannot be found within agrarian radical groups. Despite Rogin's work, the tendency to conflate left-wing populism and right-wing populism, ignoring significant differences between the two, remains a significant long-term effect of Hofstadter's work. (Note: Mark Fenster's book Conspiracy Theories: Secrecy and Power in American Culture (1999), published by University of Minnesota Press, provides a critique of and alternative to the paradigm initiated by Hofstadter. Tariq Ali's book The Extreme Centre (2015), published by Verso Books, also discusses the paradigm started by Hofstadter and the likes of Daniel Bell, Nathan Glazer, David Riesman, Seymour Martin Lipset, Earl Raab, Peter Viereck, and Alan Westin. According to right-wing movements researchers Matthew N. Lyons and Chip Berlet, "The Paranoid Style in American Politics" started the "Pluralist School" paradigm for the horseshoe theory model, which they term the "centrist/extremist theory" and consider it discredited for, among other things, lumping together "dissidents, populists of the left and right, supremacists and terrorists as an irrational lunatic fringe".)

Another aspect of Hofstadter's thesis has been challenged by Samuel DeCanio's 2011 article "Populism, Paranoia, and the Politics of Free Silver", which argues that, instead of being a paranoid delusion, the People's Party's position regarding bankers' use of bribes to influence 19th-century monetary policy was largely correct. DeCanio offers evidence that the Coinage Act of 1873, legislation that eliminated bimetallism and which the Populists denounced as the "Crime of 73", was influenced by bribes that William Ralston, president of the Bank of California, paid to Henry Linderman, director of the Philadelphia Mint. DeCanio's article includes a copy of the actual check Ralston used to pay Linderman, indicating the Populists' claims were far more accurate than Hofstadter ever suspected. A 2020 study detailed the ways in which Donald Trump used the paranoid style described by Hofstadter substantially more than his post-World War II predecessors.

== Legacy ==
In a 2007 article in Harper's, Scott Horton wrote that "The Paranoid Style in American Politics" was "one of the most important and most influential articles published in the 155–year history of the magazine". In a 2014 essay for Harper's, Thomas Frank was more critical, suggesting that Hofstadter's method had popularized a "pseudopsychological approach to politics". In 2020, the Library of America re-issued "The Paranoid Style in American Politics" alongside other Hofstadter's essays, such as "Anti-intellectualism in American Life", as part of a volume edited by Princeton historian Sean Wilentz.

Journalists continue to draw on the essay to analyze 21st-century public affairs. Laura Miller wrote in Salon in 2011 that "The Paranoid Style in American Politics" reads like "a playbook for the career of Glenn Beck, right down to the paranoid's 'quality of pedantry' and 'heroic strivings for 'evidence' embodied in Beck's chalkboard and piles of books. But Beck lacks an archenemy commensurate with his stratospheric ambitions, which makes him appear even more absurd to outsiders." Economist Paul Krugman titled a 2018 op-ed in The New York Times "The Paranoid Style in G.O.P. Politics" and explicitly referred to the 1964 essay. Researcher Travis View, writing in The Washington Post in 2019, described the QAnon conspiracy as an example of "the paranoid style as described by Hofstadter". Scholar Steve Snow argues that the Christian New Apostolic Reformation "represents what Richard Hofstadter referred to as the modern paranoid style in American politics."

Critics argued that Hofstadter erred in confining conspiracy theories to the political fringe. Eve Kosofsky Sedgwick observed that Hofstadter's essay assumes "a presumptive 'we'—apparently still practically everyone" who regard conspiracy theories "from a calm, understanding, and encompassing middle ground". Sedgwick and later Gordon Fraser argued that conspiracy theories after the middle of the 20th century proliferated to such a degree that Hofstadter's imagined, rationally liberal audience no longer exists, if it ever existed in the first place.

The essay was the inspiration for the name of American rock band The Paranoid Style. The essay's title and themes are referenced in the song "Do the Paranoid Style" by American punk rock band Bad Religion from their 2019 album Age of Unreason.

== See also ==
- Among the Truthers
- Conspiracy: How the Paranoid Style Flourishes and Where It Comes From
- Radical right (United States)
