= Nathan Carlin =

American professor of medical humanities

Nathan Steven Carlin (born 1979) is a scholar of medical humanities with interest in psychology of religion. He is the Samuel Karff Chair and a professor at the McGovern Medical School at the University of Texas Health Science Center at Houston, where he directs the McGovern Center for Humanities and Ethics.

Carlin is the editor-in-chief of the Journal of Medical Humanities. From 2018 to 2019, he served as chair of the faculty senate of McGovern Medical School. He was awarded the 2025 Health Humanities Visionary Award by the Health Humanities Consortium.

== Education ==
In 2001, Carlin earned his BA in European history from Westminster College in New Wilmington, Pennsylvania. Four years later he completed his Master of Divinity Degree at Princeton Theological Seminary, where he focused on studying pastoral theology. From PTS, he went on to earn his MA (2009) and PhD (2010) in psychology of religion from Rice University in Houston, Texas.

He was influenced by Donald Eric Capps, Thomas R. Cole, and Robert Dykstra. Carlin has co-authored and co-edited books and articles with these mentors and other colleagues, focusing on psychological and religious matters that arise in clinical contexts.

== Scholarly publications ==
Carlin has published 12 books and many articles. His work falls into five overlapping themes:

- applying psychoanalytic perspectives on culture and individuals (see The Gift of Sublimation and Religious Mourning below);
- doing theoretical work in medical humanities, with a focus on religion and medicine (see The Secularization of Medicine below);
- using theological and psychological resources for cultivating happiness and living a good life (see 100 Years of Happiness and Living in Limbo below);
- incorporating religious and psychological resources to improve clinical care, writing for an audience of chaplains (see Pastoral Aesthetics and "Reflections for CPE Students in Psychiatric Settings"); and
- teaching health professions students using experiential material from patients, family members, and health professionals (see Contemporary Physician Authors, "The Suffering of Physicians," "Doctors and Dr. Seuss," and Medicine, Meaning, and Identity below). The latter category has, in recent years, become the focus of Dr. Carlin's writing, which is currently oriented toward developing core texts for medical humanities (see Teaching Health Humanities and Medical Humanities: An Introduction).

== Personal life ==
Rev. Carlin is married to Keatan King, also a Minister of the Word and Sacrament in the Presbyterian Church (USA). Rev. King is Associate Pastor at St. Philip Presbyterian Church and has served as chair of the Board of Trustees of Austin Presbyterian Theological Seminary. They have two children.

== Bibliography ==
- Banner, O., Carlin, N., and Cole, T. (eds.). Teaching Health Humanities. New York: Oxford University Press, 2019.
- Capps, D., & Carlin, N. Living in Limbo: Life in the Midst of Uncertainty. Cascade Books, 2010.
- Carlin, N., & Capps, D. 100 Years of Happiness: Insights and Findings from the Experts. With Donald Capps. Praeger Press, 2012.
- Carlin, N., & Capps, D. The Gift of Sublimation: A Psychoanalytic Study of Multiple Masculinities. Cascade Books, 2015.
- Carlin, N. & de Medeiros, K. (eds.) Journeys of Life: Engaging the Work of Thomas R. Cole. Wipf and Stock, 2024.
- Carlin, N. Contemporary Physician-Authors: Exploring the Insights of Doctors Who Write. London and New York: Routledge, 2022.
  - Review: Jack Coulehan
- Carlin N. Doctors and Dr. Seuss: Restoring the Patient's Voice. Cambridge Quarterly of Healthcare Ethics, 2015 - cambridge.org
- Carlin, N. The meaning of life. Pastoral Psychology, 2016 - Springer
- Carlin, N. Pastoral Aesthetics: A Theological Perspective on Principlist Bioethics. New York: Oxford University Press, 2019.
  - Special Book Forum in Pastoral Psychology, December 2021
  - Review: Gaia De Vecchi
- Carlin, N. Pathographies of Mental Illness. New York: Cambridge University Press, 2022.
- Carlin, N. Reflections for clinical pastoral education students in psychiatric settings. Journal of religion and health, 2018 - Springer
- Carlin, N. Religious Mourning: Reversals and Restorations in Contemporary Psychological Portraits of Religious Leaders. Wipf and Stock, 2014.
- Carlin, N. Secularization of Medicine: Ritual, Salvation, and Prophecy. Oxford University Press, 2025.
- Cole, T., Carlin, N., & Carson, R. Medical Humanities: An Introduction. Cambridge University Press, 2015.
- Cole T, Carlin N. The suffering of physicians. The Lancet, 2009
- Flaitz CM, Carlin N. Living in limbo: Ethics and experience in a conversation about persistent oral lesions. Texas dental journal, 2013 - europepmc.org
- Lomax JW, Carlin N. Utilizing religious and spiritual material in clinical care: Two cases of religious mourning. Spirituality in Clinical Practice, 2016 - psycnet.apa.org
- Ray, K. & Carlin, N. Medicine, Meaning, and Identity: Essays from Early-Career Physicians. Oxford University Press, 2025
