= The True and Only Heaven =

1991 book by Christopher Lasch

- Author: Christopher Lasch
- Language: English
- Publisher: W. W. Norton & Company
- Publication date: 1991
- Publication place: United States
- Pages: 591
- ISBN: 978-0-393-30795-5

The True and Only Heaven: Progress and its Critics is a 1991 book by the American historian and social critic Christopher Lasch. It is a historical analysis of the American political landscape, which Lasch argues stands out due to a largely unquestioned faith in progress that unites the entire spectrum. The book traces the origins and expressions of this faith and encourages Americans to discover currents that have criticized it all along, in America notably populism and producerism, which Lasch favored because he regarded them as more democratic.

The True and Only Heaven was the last book by Lasch published during his lifetime. In the book's review of the American radical tradition, it summarizes much material from Lasch's previous books, such as The New Radicalism in America (1965), Haven in a Heartless World (1977) and The Culture of Narcissism (1979).

The book's title is taken from "The Celestial Railroad," a story by Nathaniel Hawthorne.
