= Consensus history =

Movement in American history that emphasizes American values and downplays conflict

Consensus history is a term used to define a style of American historiography and classify a group of historians who emphasize the basic unity of American values and the American national character and downplay conflicts, especially conflicts along class lines, as superficial and lacking in complexity. The term originated with historian John Higham, who coined it in a 1959 article in Commentary titled "The Cult of the American Consensus". Consensus history saw its primary period of influence in the 1950s, and it remained the dominant mode of American history until historians of the New Left began to challenge it in the 1960s.

== Meaning ==
In 1959, John Higham developed the concept of an emerging consensus among historians that he saw as based on the search for "a placid, unexciting past" as part of "a massive grading operation to smooth over America's social convulsions." Higham named his research concept critically a "Cult of the American Consensus". Higham felt the conservative frame of reference was creating a "paralyzing incapacity to deal with the elements of spontaneity, effervescence, and violence in American history". He maintained it had "a deadening effect on the historian’s ability to take a conflict of ideas seriously." Either he disbelieves in the conflict itself (Americans having been pretty much of one mind), or he trivializes it into a set of psychological adjustments to institutional change. In either case, the current fog of complacency, flecked with anxiety, spreads backward over the American past.

Peter Novick identified Richard Hofstadter and Louis Hartz as leading "liberal consensus historians" and Daniel J. Boorstin as a "leading conservative consensus historian". Novick includes as other prominent leaders David M. Potter, Perry Miller, Clinton Rossiter, Henry Steele Commager, Allan Nevins and Edmund Morgan. Consensus history rejected the concept of the central role of class conflict and all kinds of other social divisions that were prevalent in the older "Progressive" historiography, as articulated especially by Charles A. Beard, Frederick Jackson Turner, and Vernon L. Parrington.

The concept of consensus history was viewed as one-sided and harmonizing conflicting forces from the very beginning, but especially by New Left historians in the 1960s, who again stressed the central roles of economic classes, adding racism and gender inequality as two other roots of social and political conflicts.

== Richard Hofstadter ==
The term was widely applied to his revision of the supposedly Beardian idea that a fundamental class conflict was the only key to understanding history. After 1945, Hofstadter identified with a political liberalism that seemed similar to the views of other "consensus historians". Hofstadter rejected the term, because in his view conflict, also on economic terms, remained an essential aspect of political development.

The general misunderstanding of Hofstadter as an adherent of "consensus history" can be found in Eric Foner's statement that Hofstadter's book The American Political Tradition (1948) "propelled him to the very forefront of his profession." Foner argues:

Hofstadter's insight was that virtually all his subjects held essentially the same underlying beliefs. Instead of persistent conflict (whether between agrarians and industrialists, capital and labor, or Democrats and Republicans), American history was characterized by broad agreement on fundamentals, particularly the virtues of individual liberty, private property, and capitalist enterprise.

Hofstadter in 1948, thus rejected the extremely simplified black-and-white polarization between pro- and anti-business politicians as early as his American Political Tradition (1948). But he was still viewing politics from a critical left-wing perspective. Making explicit reference to Jefferson, Jackson, Lincoln, Cleveland, Bryan, Wilson, and Hoover, Hofstadter made a statement on the consensus in the American political tradition, which is sometimes seen as "ironic": "The fierceness of the political struggles has often been misleading...the major political traditions have shared a belief in the rights of property, the philosophy of economic individualism, the value of competition; they have accepted the economic virtues of capitalist culture as necessary qualities of man." Hofstadter later complained that this remark in a hastily written preface requested by the editor had been the reason for "lumping him" unfairly into the category of "consensus historians" like Boorstin, who celebrated this kind of ideological consensus as an achievement, whereas Hofstadter deplored it. In the former draft preface he had written, that American politics "has always been an arena in which conflicts of interests have been fought out, compromised, adjusted. Once these interests were sectional; now they tend more clearly to follow class lines; but from the beginning American political parties.....have been intersectional and interclass parties, embracing a jumble of interests which often have reasons for contesting among themselves."

Thus, Hofstadter modified Beard's interpretation of history as a succession of mainly socio-economic group conflicts without completely abandoning it. He thought that in almost all previous periods of the history of the United States, except the Civil War, there was an implicit fundamental consensus, shared by antagonists, explaining that the generation of Beard and Vernon Louis Parrington had "put such an excessive emphasis on conflict, that an antidote was needed." With a sociological understanding Hofstadter saw that "a political society cannot hang together, at all, unless there is some kind of consensus running through it". On the other hand, he did not minimize conflicts within such a society as "...no society as such a total consensus as to be devoid of significant conflict." There was one total failure of consensus he admitted, which led to the Civil War.

Hofstadter himself expressed his dislike of the term consensus historian several times. He also criticized Boorstin for overusing the consensus and ignoring the essential conflicts in history.

The post-1945 era was depicted by consensus historians as a harmonious return to the past, argues Lary May. He says that Hofstadter, Hartz and Boorstin believed that "the prosperity and apparent class harmony" after 1945 reflected "a return to the true Americanism rooted in liberal capitalism." The New Deal was seen as a conservative movement that led to the building of a welfare state that saved liberal capitalism instead of transforming it. Contrary to May, Christopher Lasch wrote that unlike the "consensus historians" of the 1950s, Hofstadter saw the consensus of classes on behalf of business interests not as a strength but "as a form of intellectual bankruptcy and as a reflection, moreover, not of a healthy sense of the practical but of the domination of American political thought by popular mythologies".

== See also ==
- Historiography § U.S. approaches
- Historiography of the United States
- Liberalism in the United States § Liberal consensus
