= William D. Desmond =

Irish scholar and academic (born 1974)

- Born: 1974 (age 51–52)

Academic background
- Education: Yale University (M.A., PhD)
- Thesis: The Greek Praise of Poverty: A Genealogy of Early Cynicism (1998)
- Doctoral advisor: Tad Brennan, Thomas R. Cole

Academic work
- Era: Contemporary philosophy
- Sub-discipline: Greek philosophy
- Region: Western philosophy
- Institutions: Maynooth University
- Website: https://www.maynoothuniversity.ie/people/william-desmond

William D. Desmond (born 1974) is a professor of philosophy at Maynooth University. He is mainly known for his works on ancient Greece cynicism and Hegel's philosophy.

== Life and works ==
William Desmond, a native of Cork, received most of his education in the United States. He holds a BA in Classics and Philosophy from Loyola University Maryland, a BSc in Mathematics from the Open University, and a joint MA and PhD in Classics and Philosophy from Yale University, with the dissertation "The Greek Praise of Poverty: A Genealogy of Early Cynicism". After teaching at Yale for two years, he returned to Ireland, where he lectured at University College Dublin, Trinity College Dublin, and the Milltown Institute, before securing a permanent position at Maynooth University.

== Selected publications ==
=== Books ===
- Hegel's Antiquity. Oxford University Press. 2020. doi:10.1093/oso/9780198839064.001.0001. ISBN 0-19-883906-5.
- Cynics. Routledge. 2014. doi:10.4324/9781315711744. ISBN 978-1-317-49286-3.
- Philosopher-Kings of Antiquity. Bloomsbury Publishing. 2011. ISBN 978-1-4411-0882-1.
- The Greek Praise of Poverty: Origins of Ancient Cynicism. University of Notre Dame Press. 2006. ISBN 978-0-268-02581-6.

=== Articles ===
- "Herodotus, Hegel, and knowledge". Intellectual History Review. 32 (3): 453–471. 2022-07-03. doi:10.1080/17496977.2022.2097410. ISSN 1749-6977.
