= Conspiracy: How the Paranoid Style Flourishes and Where It Comes From =

1997 book by Daniel Pipes

- First edition (publ. Free Press)
- Author: Daniel Pipes
- Genre: Nonfiction
- Publisher: Free Press
- Publication date: 1997
- ISBN: 0-684-83131-7

Conspiracy: How the Paranoid Style Flourishes and Where It Comes From is a 1997 book by historian Daniel Pipes.

In Conspiracy, Pipes argues that the fear of non-existent conspiracies has flourished down through the ages, and has sometimes had significant impact, causing coups and revolutions, bringing leaders including Lenin, Perón, Napoleon and Saddam Hussein into power, and driving Trujillo, the Gang of Four and James II of England from power.

== Reviews ==
Francis Fukuyama describes Conspiracy as a "fascinating account of conspiracy theories down through the ages, from Christian accusations against the Jews to contemporary African-American theorizing about a police conspiracy to frame O. J. Simpson and the CIA's role in promoting the aids epidemic in urban ghettoes."

In his book, Conspiracy Theory and American Foreign Policy, political scientist Tim Aistrop, of the University of Queensland, states that Pipes's Conspiracy is a useful starting point in understand the prevalence of conspiracy theories in the Muslim world. Pipes argues that conspiracy theories were mainstream in Western countries throughout the 19th and into the early 20th century, but were discredited and driven to the margins in the West because of their use by fascist and communist regimes. However, they remained mainstream within the Eastern Bloc and in Muslim countries.

== See also ==
- The Paranoid Style in American Politics
