= The Revolt of the Elites =

1995 book by Christopher Lasch

- Author: Christopher Lasch
- Language: English
- Publisher: W. W. Norton & Company
- Publication date: 1995
- Publication place: United States
- Pages: 276
- ISBN: 0-393-03699-5

The Revolt of the Elites and the Betrayal of Democracy is a book by the American writer Christopher Lasch, published posthumously by W. W. Norton & Company in 1995.

== Synopsis ==
In his last months, he worked closely with his daughter Elisabeth to complete the work, in which he "excoriated the new meritocratic class, a group that had achieved success through the upward-mobility of education and career and that increasingly came to be defined by rootlessness, cosmopolitanism, a thin sense of obligation, and diminishing reservoirs of patriotism," and "argued that this new class 'retained many of the vices of aristocracy without its virtues', lacking the sense of 'reciprocal obligation' that had been a feature of the old order."

Christopher Lasch analyzes the widening gap between the top and bottom of the social composition in the United States. For him, our epoch is determined by a social phenomenon: the revolt of the elites, in reference to The Revolt of the Masses (1929) of the Spanish philosopher José Ortega y Gasset. According to Lasch, the new elites, i.e. those who are in the top 20 percent in terms of income, through globalization which allows total mobility of capital, no longer live in the same world as their fellow-citizens. In this, they oppose the old bourgeoisie of the nineteenth and twentieth centuries, which was constrained by its spatial stability to a minimum of rooting and civic obligations.

Globalization, according to the historian, has turned elites into tourists in their own countries. The de-nationalization of society tends to produce a class who see themselves as "world citizens, but without accepting… any of the obligations that citizenship in a polity normally implies". Their ties to an international culture of work, leisure, information – make many of them deeply indifferent to the prospect of national decline. Instead of financing public services and the public treasury, new elites are investing their money in improving their voluntary ghettos: private schools in their residential neighborhoods, private police, garbage collection systems. They have "withdrawn from common life".

Composed of those who control the international flows of capital and information, who preside over philanthropic foundations and institutions of higher education, they manage the instruments of cultural production and thus fix the terms of public debate. So, the political debate is limited mainly to the dominant classes and political ideologies lose all contact with the concerns of the ordinary citizen. The result of this is that no one has a likely solution to these problems and that there are furious ideological battles on related issues. However, they remain protected from the problems affecting the working classes: the decline of industrial activity, the resulting loss of employment, the decline of the middle class, increasing the number of the poor, the rising crime rate, growing drug trafficking, the urban crisis.

In addition, he finalized his intentions for the essays to be included in Women and the Common Life: Love, Marriage, and Feminism, which was published, with his daughter's introduction, in 1997.

== Conclusion ==
All in all, Lasch criticizes progressivism and capitalism alike as anti-democratic and in just as devastating an alliance with the Professional–managerial class. Together, these forces are in conflict with the American middle class, which Lasch argues is vital for American democracy. Lasch argues that a key to create a more functioning society is to accept that humans cannot master the world.

== Reception ==
Kirkus Reviews wrote that The Revolt of the Elites stands out from Lasch's other, more pessimistic books by being hopeful about a future for democracy, through the promotion of public discourse, commonality within education and religion as an antidote to "professional arrogance". The critic called it a "wonderfully vigorous and urgent set of essays" where Lasch answers his critics with "a message so simple and obvious, it's sublime".

== See also ==
- The Revolt of the Masses (1929)
- The Managerial Revolution (1941)
