= John Higham (historian) =

American historian (1920–2003)

- Born: October 26, 1920; Jamaica, Queens, New York, U.S.
- Died: July 26, 2003 (aged 82); Baltimore, Maryland, U.S.
- Education: Johns Hopkins University (BA); Yale University (MA); University of Wisconsin–Madison (PhD)
- Occupation: Historian
- Spouse: Eileen Moss (m. 1948)
- Military career
- Branch: United States Army Air Force
- Conflicts: World War II

John William Higham (October 26, 1920 – July 26, 2003) was an American historian, scholar of American culture, historiography and ethnicity. In the 1950s he was a prominent critic of consensus history. Historian Dorothy Ross says, "The multi-ethnic environment of his early life in Queens, the wartime optimism, and his immersion in Progressive history, with its fundamental faith in American democracy, gave him a vision of an egalitarian, cosmopolitan, American nationalism in which he never lost faith."

Reviewing his seminal Stranger in the Land: Patterns of American Nativism, 1860-1925, The New York Times wrote in 1955 that Higham's study challenged the Emma Lazarus "huddled masses" welcomed by the Statute of Liberty mainstream history of American immigration.

== Biography ==
John William Higham was born in Jamaica, Queens, on October 26, 1920. He earned his undergraduate history degree from Johns Hopkins University in 1941 and received a master's degree from Yale University in 1942. In World War II, he served with the historical division of the Army Air Forces in Italy. He married psychologist Eileen Moss Higham in 1948.

After serving as assistant editor of The American Mercury, he earned a doctorate at the University of Wisconsin–Madison in 1949, working with Merle Curti. He taught at the University of California, Los Angeles, Rutgers University, Columbia University and the University of Michigan before returning to Johns Hopkins in 1971. He served as president of the Immigration and Ethnic History Society 1979–1982.

He is noted for having described anti-Catholicism in the United States as "the most luxuriant, tenacious tradition of paranoiac agitation in American history".

Higham died of a cerebral aneurysm in Baltimore, Maryland on July 26, 2003. He was 82 years old at the time of his death.

== Works ==
Many of these items have been republished. These are the first editions.

- "The rise of American intellectual history." American Historical Review 56.3 (1951): 453–471. online
- "Intellectual history and its neighbors." Journal of the History of Ideas (1954): 339–347. online
- Strangers in the Land: Patterns of American Nativism, 1860–1925, (Rutgers UP, 1955; new edition, with new epilogue, 2002).
- "Anti-Semitism in the Gilded Age: A Reinterpretation." Mississippi Valley Historical Review 43.4 (1957): 559–578. online
- "Social Discrimination Against Jews in America, 1830-1930." Publications of the American Jewish Historical Society 47.1 (1957): 1–33. online
- "Another Look at Nativism." Catholic Historical Review 44.2 (1958): 147–158. online
- "The Cult of the American Consensus: Homogenizing Our History," Commentary (1959) 27#2 pp: 93–100. online
- Editor, The reconstruction of American history (Harper, 1962).
- "Beyond Consensus: The Historian as Moral Critic." American Historical Review (1962): 609–625. in JSTOR
- History: Professional Scholarship in America (1965)
- Writing American History: Essays on Modern Scholarship (Indiana UP, 1970). ISBN 9780253201560
- "Hanging together: Divergent unities in American history." Journal of American History (1974): 5–28, Presidential address to the Organization of American Historians. online
- Send these to me: Jews and other immigrants in urban America (Scribner, 1975). ISBN 9780689106170
- Edited with Leonard Krieger, and Felix Gilbert. History (1985 [1977]). ISBN 9780824063641
- Ethnic leadership in America (Johns Hopkins UP, 1979). ISBN 9780801820366
- "Current trends in the study of ethnicity in the United States." Journal of American Ethnic History 2.1 (1982): 5–15. online
- "Changing paradigms: The collapse of consensus history." Journal of American History (1989): 460–466. in JSTOR; another copy
- "Multiculturalism and universalism: A history and critique." American Quarterly 45#2 (1993), pp. 195–219 online
- "Instead of a sequel, or how I lost my subject." Reviews in American History 28.2 (2000): 327–339. online
- Hanging Together: Unity and Diversity in American Culture, Yale University Press, 2001. Three decades of his essays. online
