= Paula S. Fass =

American historian

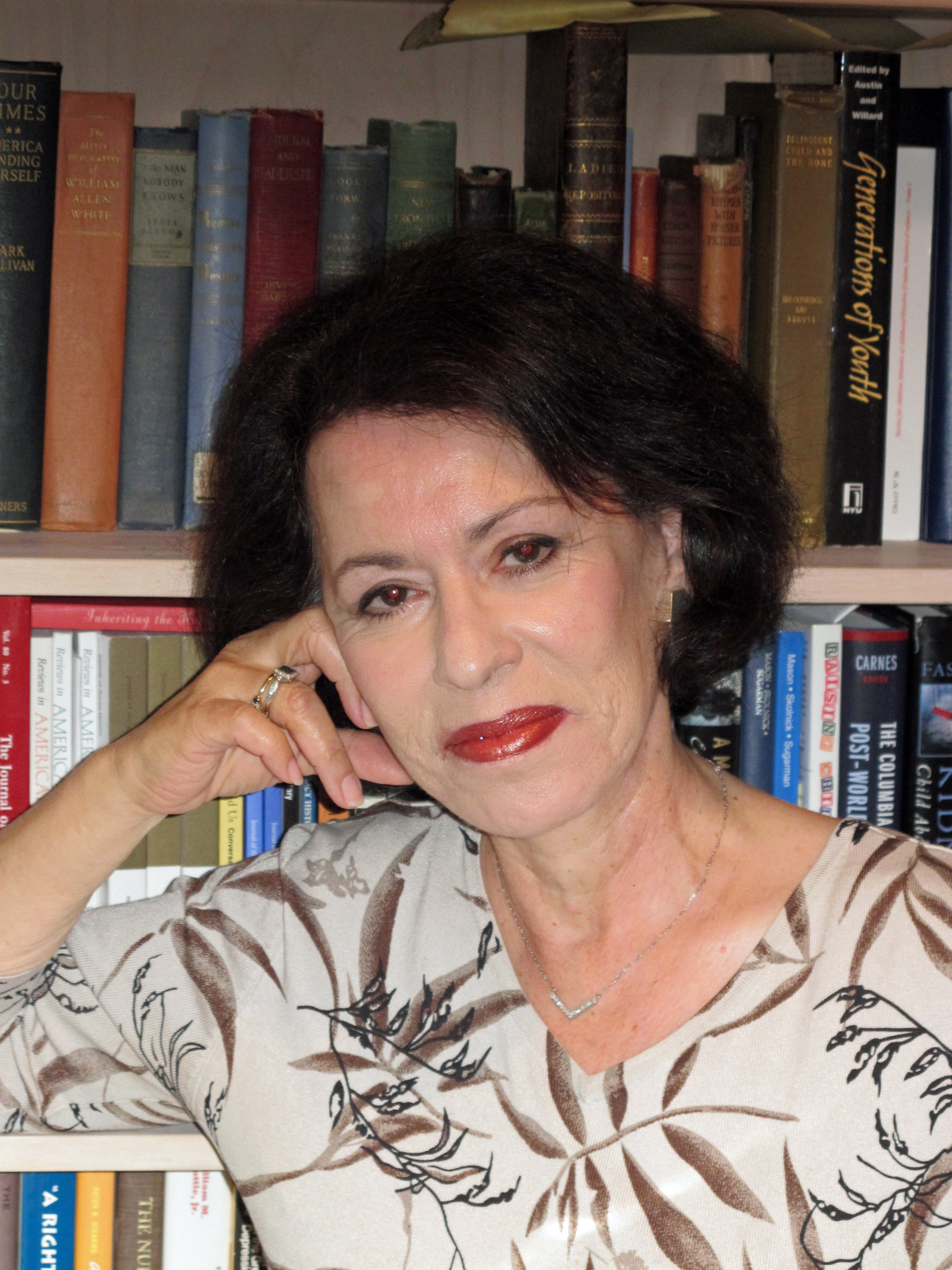
- Paula S. Fass in 2012
- Born: May 22, 1947 (age 79); Hannover, Germany

Academic background
- Education: Barnard College; Columbia University
- Doctoral advisor: Richard Hofstadter

Academic work
- Discipline: History
- Institutions: Rutgers University; University of California, Berkeley
- Main interests: History of childhood and youth in the United States

Paula S. Fass (born May 22, 1947) is an American historian and the Margaret Byrne Professor of History (Emerita) at the University of California, Berkeley. A social and cultural historian, Fass has published numerous books on the history of childhood and youth in the United States, and served as president of the Society for the History of Children and Youth from 2007 to 2009.

== Biography ==
Fass was born on May 22, 1947, and educated at Columbia University.

== Publications ==
- The End of American Childhood: A History of Parenting from Life on the Frontier to the Managed Child. Princeton University Press, 2016
- The Routledge History of Childhood in the Western World (Editor). Routledge, 2013.
- Reinventing Childhood After World War II (co-edited with Michael Grossberg). University of Pennsylvania Press, 2011.
- Children of a New World: Society, Culture, and Globalization. New York University Press, 2007.
- Encyclopedia of Children and Childhood in History and Society (Editor-in-Chief). Macmillan Reference, 2004.
- Childhood in America (co-edited with Mary Ann Mason). New York University Press, 2000.
- Kidnapped: Child Abduction in America. Oxford University Press, 1997.
- Outside In: Minorities and the Transformation of American Education. Oxford University Press, 1989.
- The Damned and the Beautiful: American Youth in the 1920s. Oxford University Press, 1977.
