= Norman Pollack =

American historian (1933–2017)

Norman Pollack (May 29, 1933 – June 11, 2017) was an American historian. He was a professor of history at Michigan State University, where he taught for most of his career. After his retirement, Pollack was a prolific essayist whose writing was informed by his scholarship in the fields of populism and social theory, but were often focused on a structural analysis of capitalism and fascism. His books included, The Populist Mind (1967), The Populist Response to Industrial America (1962), The Just Polity: Populism, Law, and Human Welfare (1987), and The Humane Economy: Populism, Capitalism, and Democracy (1990), Capitalism, Hegemony and Violence in the Age of Drones (2018).

== Life and work ==
=== Early years ===
Norman Pollack was born on May 29, 1933. He grew up in a Jewish family, and identified as Jewish. He earned a PhD from Harvard University in 1961. Pollack was honoured with a Guggenheim Fellowship in 1968.

=== Teaching, activism, and writing ===
Pollack had a long history of engaging in civil rights and anti-war activities over the decades, that began when, at 15 years of age, he campaigned for Henry Wallace and his Progressive Party in 1948. Later, he campaigned for Adlai Stevenson in the 1950s, and in the 1960s he supported Martin Luther King Jr.

Pollack was an important intellectual voice during the late 60s, and contributed to the theoretical grounding of the New Left through his writings on American populism. After receiving his doctorate in American Civilization from Harvard University, he taught at Yale and Wayne State University before going to Michigan State where he taught from 1968 until his retirement in 1998.

After his retirement from teaching, Pollack wrote essays on contemporary political matters. He would often frame these issues within the perspective of his own scholarship, which included the history of civil disobedience, socio-political alienation, and the sociology of fascism. Most of these essays, published between 2012 and 2017, originally appeared in CounterPunch.

At the time of his death in 2017, Pollack was preparing a book for publication titled Capitalism, Hegemony and Violence in the Age of Drones.

=== Death ===
Pollack died of cancer on June 11, 2017, at his home in Michigan, aged 84.

== Political and other views ==
Pollack was critical of the society of present-day Israel, the occupation of Palestine, and what he termed the "Nazification" of the country. With regards to Zionism, the historian argued that although "[it] has proven to be a colonialist-imperialist ideology, that was not always the case".

Pollack believed his own country of the United States was fascist. He was critical of the Bush administration's program of extraordinary rendition, and said that it had "turned much of the world against America, and has created the basis for the rise of militant groups and the desire for retribution."

== Selected bibliography ==
Books

- Capitalism, Hegemony and Violence in the Age of Drones. Palgrave Macmillan. 2018. ISBN 9783319648873.
- The Humane Economy: Populism, Capitalism, and Democracy. New Brunswick, NJ: Rutgers University Press. 1990.
- The Just Polity: Populism, Law, and Human Welfare. Urbana and Chicago, IL: University of Illinois Press. 1987.
- The Populist Response to Industrial America: Midwestern Populist Thought. Cambridge, MA: Harvard University Press. 1962. ISBN 9780674690516.

Journal articles

- Pollack, Norman (1962). "The Myth of Populist Anti-Semitism". The American Historical Review. 68 (1): 76–80. doi:10.2307/1847185. JSTOR 1847185.
- Pollack, Norman (1965). "Fear of Man: Populism, Authoritarianism, and the Historian". Agricultural History. 39 (2): 59–67. JSTOR 3740602.

== See also ==
- Age of Reform, The
- Populism
