= David F. Noble =

American historian and critic of technology, science and education

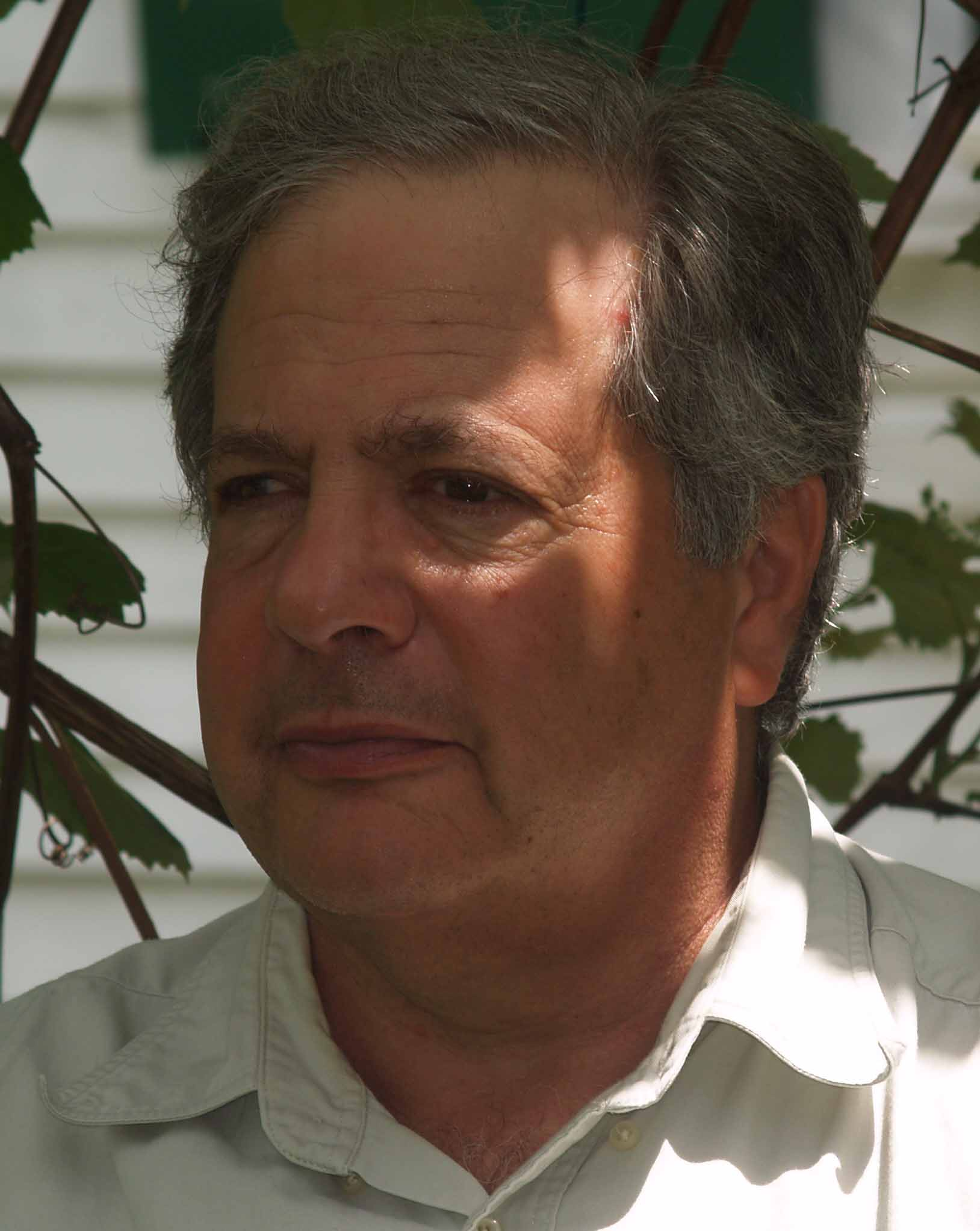
- Noble in 2010
- Born: David Franklin Noble; July 22, 1945; New York City, New York, US
- Died: December 27, 2010 (aged 65); Toronto, Ontario, Canada
- Spouse: Sarah Dopp

Academic background
- Education: University of Florida; University of Rochester
- Doctoral advisor: Christopher Lasch

Academic work
- Discipline: History
- Institutions: Massachusetts Institute of Technology; York University

David Franklin Noble (July 22, 1945 – December 27, 2010) was a historian and critic of technology, science and education, best known for his seminal work on the social history of automation. In his final years he taught in the Division of Social Science and the department of Social and Political Thought at York University in Toronto, Canada. Noble held positions at the Massachusetts Institute of Technology, the Smithsonian Institution, and Drexel University, as well as many visiting professorships.

Noble died suddenly in a Toronto hospital after contracting a virulent strain of pneumonia that caused septic shock and kidney failure.

Noble was born in New York City.

== Career ==
Noble obtained an undergraduate degree in history and chemistry from the University of Florida and a doctorate from the University of Rochester. He worked as a biochemist at various institutions before becoming an assistant professor at the Massachusetts Institute of Technology. Dismissed after being denied tenure in 1984, he landed at York University. Between 1986 and 1994, Noble taught in the Department of History and Politics at Drexel University. In 1997 he served as the inaugural Hixon-Riggs Visiting Professor of science, technology, and society at Harvey Mudd College. Noble taught at York University until his death.

== Pedagogy ==
During his entire teaching career Noble refused to grade students, based on the idea from critical pedagogy of the harm caused by grading.

== Written work ==
=== America by Design ===
Noble's first book, America by Design: Science, Technology, and the Rise of Corporate Capitalism (1977), a revision of his University of Rochester dissertation under Christopher Lasch, was published to unusually prominent reviews. Robert Heilbroner hailed it as a work that "makes us see technology as a force that shapes management in an industrial capitalist society," while The New York Times called the book a "significant contribution" owing to its uncommon leftist perspective on American technology. Many academic reviewers praised the book's bold argument about the corporate control of science and technology, although some including Alfred Chandler expressed reservations about its forthright Marxist thesis.

=== Forces of Production ===
In Forces of Production: A Social History of Industrial Automation (1984, 1st edition; 2011, 2nd edition) Noble recounts the history of machine tool automation in the United States. He argues that CNC (computerized numerical control) machines were introduced both to increase efficiency and to discipline unions which were stronger in the US in the period immediately following World War II. Forces of Production argues that management wanted to take the programming of machine tools, which as "machines for making machines" are a critical industrial product, out of the hands of union members and transfer their control, by means of primitive programming, to non-union, college-educated white-collar employees working physically separate from the shop floor. Noble's research argues that, in practical terms, the separation was a failure. The practice angered and alienated union machinists, who felt that their practical and night-school knowledge of applied science was being disregarded. In response, they sat back while watching the programmed machines produce what Noble described as "scrap at high speed." Noble then went on to argue that management compromised with the unions, in a minor violation of the US's 1948 Taft–Hartley Act (which reserved all issues except pay and benefits to management discretion), to allow the union men to "patch" and even write the CNC programs. Although Noble focuses strictly, in Forces of Production, on the narrow and specialist area of machine tools, his work may be generalized to issues in MIS software where the end users are restive when told to accept the product of analysts ignorant of the real needs of the business or the employee. David also wrote the Introduction to the second edition of Mike Cooley's Architect or Bee? published in the US in 1982 by South End Press.

=== Last writing ===
Pursuing his critique of the role of the university, since 2004 Noble was active in bringing attention to what he identified as issues of social justice. These included the notion of the increasing corporatization of the Canadian public university, and defending the idea of academic freedom and the role of the tenured academic as public servant. Noble's most recent book, Beyond the Promised Land: The Movement and the Myth, is a sweeping historiography of what he described as the myth of the promised land, connecting the disappointments of the Christian religious story of redemption and salvation with the rise of global capitalism and the response to these disappointments by recent social justice movements.

== Political activism ==
In 1983 Noble co-founded the National Coalition for Universities in the Public Interest with Ralph Nader and Leonard Minsky to try "to bring extra-academic pressure to bear upon university administrations who were selling out their colleagues and the public in the pursuit of corporate partnerships."

Noble's leftist politics and supposedly aggressive tactics gave him a rocky career. He was denied tenure at MIT, forced to leave his appointment at the Smithsonian Institution, and blocked from giving the commencement address at Harvey Mudd College because the administration argued he was "anti-technology." His appointment to the J.S. Woodsworth Chair in the Humanities at Simon Fraser University was suspended following what Noble and others saw as irregularities in the hiring process.

In 1998, he was awarded the Joe A. Callaway Award for Civic Courage, which "recognizes individuals who take a public stance to advance truth and justice, at some personal risk." The award honored Noble's decades as "a singular voice in seeking to fight the commercialization of higher education and to protect one of society's most precious assets, an independent intellectual capacity to engage the serious issues of our day."

=== Corporatization and commercialization ===
In the 1990s, Noble criticized the way in which "second tier" universities accessible to the majority have been forced, owing to budget pressures absent at well endowed "first tier" universities, to adopt corporate-friendly policies. According to Noble, these policies subordinate the educational mission to a more careerist vision in which students were taught "practical" subjects, but in such narrow ways that they were, in effect, less broadly employable. In his 1998 paper Digital Diploma Mills, Noble wrote: "universities are not only undergoing a technological transformation. Beneath that change, and camouflaged by it, lies another: the commercialization of higher education". Noble argued that high technology, at these universities, is often used not to improve teaching and research, but to control and overwork junior faculty and graduate students, expropriate the intellectual property of leading faculty, and, through various mechanisms such as the recorded lecture, replace the visions and voices of less prestigious faculty with the second-hand and reified product of academic "superstars".

=== "Tail that Wags the Dog" ===
In his broad-based critique of what he viewed as an academic-industrial system, Noble questioned Israel's strategic role in Western institutions on a broad basis. In late November 2004, at York University, Noble raised controversy for handing out flyers entitled "The York University Foundation: The Tail That Wags the Dog (Suggestions for Further Research)" at a campus event. The information sheets alleged that the Foundation, York University's principal fund-raising body, was biased by the presence and influence of pro-Israel lobbyists, activists and persons involved in Jewish agencies, whom he identified as the "tail", and that this bias affected the political conduct of York's administration in important ways, through their power to "wag the dog". In particular, Noble, who was of Jewish descent himself, claimed that there was a connection between alleged "Pro-Israeli influence" on the York Foundation and the university administration's treatment of vocal pro-Palestinian campaigners on campus and to a scuttled project to build a Toronto Argonauts football stadium on the campus. York University responded with a public statement that "condemned the material in the flyer as offensive." In 2006 Noble launched a $25-million libel suit at the Ontario Superior Court of Justice against a series of individuals and of York University, Jewish, and Israeli organizations for defamation and conspiracy, accusing them of having improperly criticized his "Tail That Wags the Dog" campaign as antisemitic. In 2007, Noble's grievance against York that his academic freedom had been violated was settled, with the arbitrator saying, "York breached Article 10.01 of the Collective Agreement by failing to respect Professor Noble’s rights as an academic. Indeed, it may be said that York failed to extend Professor Noble even the most basic of courtesies that might reasonably be expected to be enjoyed by a faculty member."

=== Jewish holidays ===
Noble and York University also were in the news in October 2005 with regard to his vocal opposition to the university's policy, adopted in 1974, of cancelling classes during the three days marking the Jewish High Holidays. Noble originally stated he would defy the policy and hold classes nonetheless, but eventually pledged instead to cancel his classes on all religious holidays observed by any student in his classes, including all Muslim holidays. In April 2006 Noble lodged a complaint with the Ontario Human Rights Commission, alleging that cancellation of classes during certain Jewish holidays constituted discrimination against non-Jewish students. In 2008 he held a class when the university was closed for one of those holidays. When York independently changed its policy the discrimination matter was withdrawn. In his complaint, Noble also alleged that York engaged in a campaign of reprisal against him. The Human Rights Tribunal of Ontario found no reprisal and dismissed Noble's complaint in its entirety.

=== York Public Access ===
In his final years at York, Noble was involved in creating an organization called York Public Access as an alternative to what he identified as an increased corporate slant in the approach taken by York University's official media relations department.

== Books ==
- America By Design; Science, Technology, and the Rise of Corporate Capitalism, New York: Knopf, 1977, ISBN 978-0-394-49983-3, LCCN 76047928
- Forces of Production; A Social History of Industrial Automation, New York: Knopf, 1984, ISBN 978-0-394-51262-4, LCCN 83048867
- Smash Machines, Not People!; Fighting Management's Myth of Progress, San Pedro: Singlejack Books of Miles & Weir, Ltd, 1985, ISBN 978-0-917300-17-2, LCCN 84052662
- A World Without Women; The Christian Clerical Culture of Western Science, New York: Knopf, 1992, ISBN 978-0-394-55650-5, LCCN 91023073
- Progress Without People; In Defence of Luddism, Chicago: Charles H. Kerr, 1993, ISBN 978-0-88286-218-7
- Progress Without People; New Technology, Unemployment, and the Message of Resistance, Toronto: Between the Lines Press, 1995, ISBN 978-1-896357-01-0, LCCN 95172673
- The Religion of Technology; The Divinity of Man and the Spirit of Invention, New York: Knopf, 1997, ISBN 978-0-679-42564-9, LCCN 96048019
- Digital Diploma Mills; The Automation of Higher Education, New York: Monthly Review Press, 2001, ISBN 978-1-58367-061-3, LCCN 2001057931
- Beyond the Promised Land: The Movement and the Myth, Toronto: Between the Lines Press, 2005, ISBN 978-1-897071-01-4, LCCN 2005482537

== See also ==
- Critique of technology
- Jeremy Rifkin
- Michael Adas
- Mike Cooley
