= The Age of Reform =

1955 history book by Richard Hofstadter

- Author: Richard Hofstadter
- Publication date: 1955
- Pages: 330

The Age of Reform From Bryan to FDR: Populism, Progressivism, and the New Deal is a 1955 Pulitzer Prize-winning book by Richard Hofstadter. It is an American history, which traces events from the Populist Movement of the 1890s through the Progressive Era to the New Deal of the 1930s. The Age of Reform stands out from other historical material because Hofstadter's main purpose for writing is not to retell an extensive history of the three movements, but to analyze the common beliefs of the reform groups in our modern perspective to elucidate historical distortions, most notably between the New Deal and Progressivism.

== Contents ==
Hofstadter organizes The Age Of Reform chronologically, beginning with Populism. The key concept he introduces is "the agrarian myth," the representation of the homage Americans have paid to the subsistence, innocent, and yeoman farmer of old. The myth became a stereotype since agriculture became more commercial and industrial. Populism's main cause for formation was the alleged loss of "free land." Many Populist leaders believed that industry and government had a vendetta to destroy the agricultural business.

The last chapter on Populism explains the agricultural prosperity after the Populist revolt because city migration lessened competition that had caused farmers to organize for the first time. Hofstadter highlights the foibles in the Populist revolt. The first was its sectional appeal, rather than national. Also, he argues its leaders were incompetent and that there was a perennial lack of funds. However, the single most destructive weakness was lack of silver. By joining with the Democratic campaign of 1896 on silver, Populists lost political ground. Despite their dissolution, Populists were successful because they caused the passage of new laws, years later.

The next major reform movement was Progressivism. The two groups of Populism and Progressivism shared many philosophies, but the latter was widely accepted because it was not seen by the majority as anarchically. The causes for Progressivism were the status revolution in the post-American Civil War era ("new money" supplanted "old money" prestige), the alienation of professionals, and the introduction of the Mugwump. The urban scene during the Progressive era, as argued by Hofstadter, provided little support for the Progressive movement because immigrants cared not for reforms but for democracy in general. Hofstadter provides evidence from numerous sources of the general nativism possessed by Progressives. As a corollary of the growing urban scene, aggressive newspaper reporters, named muckrakers, emerged. The Progressive journalists multiplied as new styles of magazines appeared.

The last chapter focused on enemies of Progressives like trusts, unions, and political machines. Leaders expressed the need for entrepreneurship, individualism, and moral responsibility rather than organization.

The final section stretches from Progressivism's end to the New Deal. Reformists have an interesting relationship with wars in that the aftermath of war is usually a time of conservatism, as was the case after World War I, which heralded the death of Progressivism. The New Deal was a culmination of both Populism and Progressivism; however, Hofstadter stresses that for the most part, the New Deal was a "new departure" and despite its continual association with Progressivism, it was quite dissimilar.

The reason it was different is that the New Deal was born out of the Great Depression, not prosperity, as were Populism and Progressivism. The New Deal was concerned with not democratizing the economy but managing it to meet the problems of the people. The New Deal had no set plans of reform; it was a chaotic experiment. Old Progressive woes were ignored. Party bosses were left alone. The New Deal did not intercede between the public and big business because the public wanted economic restoration, not regulation. A major disparity between Progressivism and the New Deal was that the latter was not based on Protestant morality and responsibility but was more pragmatic. It did not use moral rhetoric to create changes but physically acted.

== Critics ==
Some of Hofstadter's arguments have since been attacked by defenders of Populism. Historians, including Norman Pollack, C. Vann Woodward, and Lawrence Goodwyn argue that Hofstadter's misunderstandings include the fact that the Populists were not simply incipient capitalists trying to reform but instead forward-looking radicals, who sought a democratized industrial system and a transformation of social values in order to help the individual protect his humanity as his autonomy slipped away from him in a rapidly industrializing society. Goodwyn argues that Hofstadter "managed to frame his interpretation of the intellectual content of Populism without recourse to a single reference to the planks of the Omaha Platform of the People's Party or to any of the economic, political, or cultural experiences that led to the creation of those goals."

The Progressives, according to Robert H. Wiebe and others in the "modernization school" were made up not of status revolutionaries from the old guard or disaffected professionals but were in a new class of educated professionals who came of age in the new interconnected modernizing world. They not only understood how to navigate the new bureaucracy by creating symbiotic relationships between government, education, and business but also pressed through "reforms" that did away with the old "local" way of doing business by enacting civil service reforms replacing elected officials with appointed "experts."
