= Alice Day Pratt =

- Born: June 16, 1872 near Mankato, Minnesota
- Died: January 11, 1963 (aged 90); New York City
- Education: Home schooling
- Occupation(s): Homesteader, writer, teacher
- Known for: Homesteading alone in the high desert
- Parent(s): William and Sophie Pratt
- Relatives: Julius (brother), Marjorie (younger sister)

Alice Day Pratt was a teacher and author who at age 40 joined the last wave of government-sponsored homesteading in the U.S. state of Oregon. Pratt, who was single, established a dryland farm and ranch near Post, about 60 miles (97 km) east of Bend. The 160-acre (65 ha) parcel of land became hers through provisions of the Enlarged Homestead Act of 1909. Living on her ranch, Broadview, from 1912 through 1930, she kept dogs, cats, horses, chickens, and cows and sometimes produced enough surplus to sell alfalfa, hay, grain, milk, eggs, and vegetables. To supplement her income, she taught school in Post, Prineville, and Conant Basin.

== Biography ==
Born in Minnesota in 1872, Pratt grew up there and in South Dakota, later teaching in the South before moving to Oregon to start a new life. Living at first in a tent, Pratt worked Broadview primarily by herself with occasional help from neighbors and other homesteaders. They eventually helped her build a barn and a wooden house consisting of a single room measuring 12 by 20 feet (4 by 6 m). She wrote about her initial Broadview experience in A Homesteader's Portfolio, first published in 1922. Cold, wind, snow, and drought eventually forced her to sell her dairy herd to repay a loan, and in 1930 she gave up dryland farming and moved east to Niagara Falls, to live with her mother and sister. Later relocating to New York City, she retained possession of Broadview until 1950.

First published by The Macmillan Company, A Homesteader's Portfolio was reprinted by the Oregon State University Press in 1993. Pratt's other work includes Animal Babies and Animals of a Sagebrush Ranch, both for juvenile readers, as well as Three Frontiers, and the Alice Day Pratt Papers, 1960. Unpublished work includes a novel called Sagebrush Fires, several short stories, and Teacher's Trek, a memoir about her teaching experiences.

== See also ==
- Julius W. Pratt, Alice Pratt's brother, a noted historian

== Sources ==
- Shirley, Gayle C. (1998). More Than Petticoats: Remarkable Oregon Women. Helena, Montana: Falcon Publishing. ISBN 1-56044-668-4.
