= Julius W. Pratt =

American historian

Julius William Pratt (1888–1983) was a United States historian who specialized in foreign relations and imperialism. Noted for his studies on the origins of the War of 1812 and the war with Spain in 1898, he also wrote a two-volume biography of Cordell Hull. He was the historian who rediscovered John L. O'Sullivan and his role in originating the idea of Manifest Destiny.

== Biography ==
The frontier and colonial nature of Pratt's family background is noteworthy. Pratt was the son of William McLain Pratt and Sophie Rand. Originally from Meriden, Connecticut, William had fought in the Civil War and married Sophie in 1869. Following the death of his father, Julius, William and Sophie moved from Connecticut to Blue Earth County, Minnesota, near Mankato in the Minnesota River Valley, in 1870, to work in the lumber industry. Economic conditions forced William to move to South Dakota while the family remained in Minnesota, but in 1886 Sophie and daughter Alice (two others had perished in Minnesota) moved to Little Elk Canyon, 25 miles (40 km) from Deadwood, South Dakota and 15 miles (24 km) from Rapid City, South Dakota. In 1888, Julius W. was born. In 1900 the family moved to the Blue Ridge region of North Carolina. Pratt's older sister Alice Day acquired her own reputation as a writer, teacher, and homesteader in Oregon.

He attended Davidson College and graduated in 1908. Pratt would go on to the University of Chicago for graduate work, where he studied under the direction of William E. Dodd. He received his Ph.D. in 1924. Pratt taught English at the United States Naval Academy from 1919 to 1924, before moving to Rutgers University for two years. In 1926 he left Rutgers for the University of Buffalo, where he was the inaugural Emanuel Boasberg Professor of History. Richard Hofstadter, who was an undergraduate there, identified Pratt as his most important teacher at Buffalo.

Pratt delivered the Albert Shaw Lectures on Diplomatic History in 1936, later published as The Expansionists of 1898: The Acquisition of Hawaii and the Spanish Islands. In the period 1938–39, Pratt was one of the "Committee of Ten on Reorganization and Policy" charged by the American Historical Association with reviewing the organization and recommending improvements. Pratt remained at Buffalo for the remainder of his entire career. He retired in 1959 as Dean Emeritus of the Graduate School of Arts and Sciences at the University at Buffalo. The following year, he taught as a visiting professor at Hobart and William Smith colleges. He died in 1983.

== Publications ==
- "Machinery in Sixteenth-Century English Industry," Journal of Political Economy 22:8 (October 1914): 775–790.
- Expansionists of 1812 (New York: The Macmillan Company, 1925)
- Expansionists of 1898: The Acquisition of Hawaii and the Spanish Islands (Baltimore: Johns Hopkins University Press, 1936)
- A History of United States Foreign Policy (New York: Prentice-Hall, 1955)
- Cordell Hull, 1933–1944 In Two Volumes (New York: Cooper Square, 1964)
