= The End of American Childhood =

2016 non-fiction book by Paula S. Fass

- First edition
- Author: Paula S. Fass
- Subject: Social history, American history, education, parenting
- Published: 2016 (Princeton University Press)
- Pages: 352
- ISBN: 9780691162577

The End of American Childhood: A History of Parenting from Life on the Frontier to the Managed Child was written by historian Paula S. Fass and published by Princeton University Press in 2016. The book explores how parent–child relationships have influenced national culture in the United States and contends that the societal importance of adolescence has waned.
