= Christopher Lasch =

American historian (1932–1994)

- Born: Robert Christopher Lasch; June 1, 1932; Omaha, Nebraska, US
- Died: February 14, 1994 (aged 61); Pittsford, New York, US
- Spouse: Nell Commager (m. 1956)
- Children: 4

Academic background
- Education: Harvard University (BA); Columbia University (MA, PhD)
- Thesis: Revolution and Democracy (1961)
- Doctoral advisor: William Leuchtenburg
- Influences: Theodor Adorno; Orestes Brownson; Jacques Ellul; Ralph Waldo Emerson; Sigmund Freud; Henry George; Nathaniel Hawthorne; Richard Hofstadter; Max Horkheimer; Martin Luther King Jr.; William Leuchtenburg; Karl Marx; Lewis Mumford; Reinhold Niebuhr; Philip Rieff

Academic work
- Discipline: History
- Institutions: University of Iowa; University of Rochester
- Doctoral students: Kevin Mattson; David F. Noble
- Notable works: The Culture of Narcissism (1979)
- Influenced: Thomas R. Cole; Patrick Deneen; Charles Taylor; Paul Gottfried

Robert Christopher Lasch (June 1, 1932 – February 14, 1994) was an American historian and social critic who was a history professor at the University of Rochester. Lasch's books, including The New Radicalism in America (1965), Haven in a Heartless World (1977), The Culture of Narcissism (1979), The True and Only Heaven (1991), and The Revolt of the Elites and the Betrayal of Democracy (published posthumously in 1995) were widely discussed and reviewed. The Culture of Narcissism became a surprise best-seller and won the National Book Award in the category Current Interest (paperback). (Note: From 1980 to 1983 in National Book Award history there were dual awards for hardcover and paperback books in many categories. Most of the paperback award-winners were reprints, including this one (September 1979), but its first edition (January 1979) was eligible in the same award year.)

Lasch sought to use history to demonstrate what he saw as the pervasiveness with which major institutions, public and private, were eroding the competence and independence of families and communities. Therefore, he strove to create a historically informed social criticism that could teach Americans how to deal with rampant consumerism, proletarianization, and what he famously labeled "the culture of narcissism".

Lasch was always a critic of modern liberalism and a historian of liberalism's discontents, but over time, his political perspective evolved dramatically. In the 1960s, he was a neo-Marxist and acerbic critic of Cold War liberalism. Beginning in the 1970s, he combined certain aspects of cultural conservatism with a left-leaning critique of capitalism, and drew on Freud-influenced critical theory to diagnose the ongoing deterioration that he perceived in American culture and politics. His writings are sometimes denounced by feminists and hailed by conservatives for his apparent defense of a traditional conception of family life. Lasch eventually concluded that an often unspoken, but pervasive, faith in "Progress" tended to make Americans resistant to many of his arguments. In one of his last major works, The True and Only Heaven, he explored this theme in depth, suggesting that Americans had much to learn from the suppressed and misunderstood populist and artisan movements of the nineteenth and early twentieth centuries.

== Biography ==
Born on June 1, 1932, in Omaha, Nebraska, Christopher Lasch came from a secular, highly political family rooted in the left. His father, Robert Lasch, was a Rhodes Scholar and journalist who won a Pulitzer prize for editorials criticizing the Vietnam War while he was in St. Louis. His mother, Zora Lasch (née Schaupp), who held a philosophy doctorate, worked as a social worker and teacher.

Lasch was active in the arts and letters early, publishing a neighborhood newspaper while in grade school and writing the fully orchestrated "Rumpelstiltskin, Opera in D Major" at the age of thirteen. Around this time, Robert Lasch moved the family to the Chicago suburbs after he was offered an editorial position at the Chicago Sun. Lasch graduated from Barrington High School.

=== Career ===
Lasch earned a bachelor's degree in history from Harvard University, where he roomed with John Updike. He then received a master's degree in history and doctorate from Columbia University, where he worked with William Leuchtenburg. Richard Hofstadter was also a significant influence. He contributed a foreword to later editions of Hofstadter's The American Political Tradition and an article on Hofstadter in the New York Review of Books in 1973. He taught at the University of Iowa and then was a professor of history at the University of Rochester from 1970 until his death from cancer in 1994. Lasch also took a conspicuous public role. Russell Jacoby acknowledged this in writing that "I do not think any other historian of his generation moved as forcefully into the public arena". In 1986, he appeared on Channel 4 television in discussion with Michael Ignatieff and Cornelius Castoriadis.

During the 1960s, Lasch identified as a socialist, but one who found influence not just in the writers of the time, such as C. Wright Mills, but also in earlier independent voices, such as Dwight Macdonald. Lasch became further influenced by writers of the Frankfurt School and the early New Left Review and felt that "Marxism seemed indispensable to me". During the 1970s, however, he became disenchanted with the Left's belief in progress—a theme treated later by his student David Noble—and increasingly identified this belief as the factor that explained the Left's failure to thrive despite the widespread discontent and conflict of the times. He was a professor of history at Northwestern University from 1966 to 1970.

At this point Lasch began to formulate what would become his signature style of social critique: a syncretic synthesis of Sigmund Freud and the strand of socially conservative thinking that remained deeply suspicious of capitalism and its effects on traditional institutions.

Besides Leuchtenburg, Hofstadter, and Freud, Lasch was especially influenced by Orestes Brownson, Henry George, Lewis Mumford, Jacques Ellul, Reinhold Niebuhr, and Philip Rieff. A notable group of graduate students worked with Lasch at the University of Rochester, Eugene Genovese, and, for a time, Herbert Gutman, including Leon Fink, Russell Jacoby, Bruce Levine, David Noble, Maurice Isserman, William Leach, Rochelle Gurstein, Kevin Mattson, and Catherine Tumber.

=== Personal ===
In 1956, Lasch married Nellie Commager, daughter of historian Henry Steele Commager; the couple had four children.

=== Death ===
After seemingly successful cancer surgery in 1992, Lasch was diagnosed with metastatic cancer in 1993. Upon learning that it was unlikely to significantly prolong his life, he refused chemotherapy, observing that it would rob him of the energy he needed to continue writing and teaching. To one persistent specialist, he wrote: "I despise the cowardly clinging to life, purely for the sake of life, that seems so deeply ingrained in the American temperament." He died at his home in Pittsford, New York, on February 14, 1994, at age 61.

== Ideas ==
=== The New Radicalism in America ===
Lasch's earliest argument, anticipated partly by Hofstadter's concern with the cycles of fragmentation among radical movements in the United States, was that American radicalism had at some point in the past become socially untenable. Members of "the Left" had abandoned their former commitments to economic justice and suspicion of power, to assume professionalized roles and to support commoditized lifestyles which hollowed out communities' self-sustaining ethics. His first major book, The New Radicalism in America: The Intellectual as a Social Type, published in 1965 (with a promotional blurb from Hofstadter), expressed those ideas in the form of a bracing critique of twentieth-century liberalism's efforts to accrue power and restructure society, while failing to follow up on the promise of the New Deal. Most of his books, even the more strictly historical ones, include such sharp criticism of the priorities of alleged "radicals" who represented merely extreme formations of a rapacious capitalist ethos.

His basic thesis about the family, which he first expressed in 1965 and explored for the rest of his career, was:

When government was centralized and politics became national in scope, as they had to be to cope with the energies let loose by industrialism, and when public life became faceless and anonymous and society an amorphous democratic mass, the old system of paternalism (in the home and out of it) collapsed, even when its semblance survived intact. The patriarch, though he might still preside in splendor at the head of his board, had come to resemble an emissary from a government which had been silently overthrown. The mere theoretical recognition of his authority by his family could not alter the fact that the government which was the source of all his ambassadorial powers had ceased to exist.

=== The Culture of Narcissism ===
Lasch's most famous work, The Culture of Narcissism: American Life in an Age of Diminishing Expectations (1979), sought to relate the hegemony of modern-day capitalism to an encroachment of a "therapeutic" mindset into social and family life similar to that already theorized by Philip Rieff. Lasch posited that social developments in the 20th century (e.g., World War II and the rise of consumer culture in the years following) gave rise to a narcissistic personality structure, in which individuals' fragile self-concepts had led, among other things, to a fear of commitment and lasting relationships (including religion), a dread of aging (i.e., the 1960s and 1970s "youth culture") and a boundless admiration for fame and celebrity (nurtured initially by the motion picture industry and furthered principally by television). He claimed, further, that this personality type conformed to structural changes in the world of work (e.g., the decline of agriculture and manufacturing in the US and the emergence of the "information age"). With those developments, he charged, inevitably there arose a certain therapeutic sensibility (and thus dependence) that, inadvertently or not, undermined older notions of self-help and individual initiative. By the 1970s, even pleas for "individualism" were desperate and essentially ineffectual cries that expressed a deeper lack of meaningful individuality. Historian Mitch Horowitz has noted that Lasch was also "one of the most formidable critics of New Age and alternative spirituality."

The Culture of Narcissism won a National Book Award in 1980, but Lasch was not comfortable with the honor, saying that publishing awards reflected "the worst tendencies" of the industry.

=== The True and Only Heaven ===
Most explicitly in The True and Only Heaven, Lasch developed a critique of social change amidst the middle classes in the US, explaining and seeking to counteract the fall of "populism". He sought to rehabilitate this populist or producerist alternative tradition: "The tradition I am talking about ... tends to be skeptical of programs for the wholesale redemption of society ... It is very radically democratic and in that sense it clearly belongs on the Left. But on the other hand it has a good deal more respect for tradition than is common on the Left, and for religion too." And said that: "...any movement that offers any real hope for the future will have to find much of its moral inspiration in the plebeian radicalism of the past and more generally in the indictment of progress, large-scale production and bureaucracy that was drawn up by a long line of moralists whose perceptions were shaped by the producers' view of the world."

=== Critique of progressivism and libertarianism ===
By the 1980s, Lasch had heaped scorn on the whole spectrum of contemporary mainstream American political thought, angering liberals with attacks on progressivism and feminism. He wrote that

A feminist movement that respected the achievements of women in the past would not disparage housework, motherhood or unpaid civic and neighborly services. It would not make a paycheck the only symbol of accomplishment. ... It would insist that people need self-respecting honorable callings, not glamorous careers that carry high salaries but take them away from their families.

Journalist Susan Faludi dubbed him explicitly anti-feminist for his criticism of the abortion rights movement and opposition to divorce. But Lasch viewed Ronald Reagan's conservatism as the antithesis of tradition and moral responsibility. Lasch was not generally sympathetic to the cause of what was then known as the New Right, particularly those elements of libertarianism most evident in its platform; he detested the encroachment of the capitalist marketplace into all aspects of American life.

Lasch rejected the dominant political constellation that emerged in the wake of the New Deal in which economic centralization and social tolerance formed the foundations of American liberal ideals, while also rebuking the diametrically opposed synthetic conservative ideology fashioned by William F. Buckley Jr. and Russell Kirk. Lasch was also critical and at times dismissive toward his closest contemporary kin in social philosophy, communitarianism as elaborated by Amitai Etzioni. Only populism satisfied Lasch's criteria of economic justice (not necessarily equality, but minimizing class-based difference), participatory democracy, strong social cohesion and moral rigor; yet populism had made major mistakes during the New Deal and increasingly been co-opted by its enemies and ignored by its friends. For instance, he praised the early work and thought of Martin Luther King Jr. as exemplary of American populism; yet in Lasch's view, King fell short of this radical vision by embracing in the last few years of his life an essentially bureaucratic solution to ongoing racial stratification.

He explained in one of his books The Minimal Self, "it goes without saying that sexual equality in itself remains an eminently desirable objective ...". In Women and the Common Life, Lasch clarified that urging women to abandon the household and forcing them into a position of economic dependence in the workplace, pointing out the importance of professional careers does not entail liberation, so long as these careers are governed by the requirements of corporate economy.

=== The Revolt of the Elites: And the Betrayal of Democracy ===
In his last months, he worked closely with his daughter Elisabeth to complete the work, in which he "excoriated the new meritocratic class, a group that had achieved success through the upward-mobility of education and career and that increasingly came to be defined by rootlessness, cosmopolitanism, a thin sense of obligation, and diminishing reservoirs of patriotism," and "argued that this new class 'retained many of the vices of aristocracy without its virtues', lacking the sense of 'reciprocal obligation' that had been a feature of the old order."

Christopher Lasch analyzes the widening gap between the top and bottom of the social composition in the United States. For him, our epoch is determined by a social phenomenon: the revolt of the elites, in reference to The Revolt of the Masses (1929) of the Spanish philosopher José Ortega y Gasset. According to Lasch, the new elites, i.e. those who are in the top 20 percent in terms of income, through globalization which allows total mobility of capital, no longer live in the same world as their fellow-citizens. In this, they oppose the old bourgeoisie of the nineteenth and twentieth centuries, which was constrained by its spatial stability to a minimum of rooting and civic obligations.

Globalization, according to the historian, has turned elites into tourists in their own countries. The de-nationalization of society tends to produce a class who see themselves as "world citizens, but without accepting… any of the obligations that citizenship in a polity normally implies". Their ties to an international culture of work, leisure, information – make many of them deeply indifferent to the prospect of national decline. Instead of financing public services and the public treasury, new elites are investing their money in improving their voluntary ghettos: private schools in their residential neighborhoods, private police, garbage collection systems. They have "withdrawn from common life".

Composed of those who control the international flows of capital and information, who preside over philanthropic foundations and institutions of higher education, they manage the instruments of cultural production and thus fix the terms of public debate. So, the political debate is limited mainly to the dominant classes and political ideologies lose all contact with the concerns of the ordinary citizen. The result of this is that no one has a likely solution to these problems and that there are furious ideological battles on related issues. However, they remain protected from the problems affecting the working classes: the decline of industrial activity, the resulting loss of employment, the decline of the middle class, increasing the number of the poor, the rising crime rate, growing drug trafficking, the urban crisis.

In addition, he finalized his intentions for the essays to be included in Women and the Common Life: Love, Marriage, and Feminism, which was published, with his daughter's introduction, in 1997.

== Legacy ==
Eric Miller's biography Hope in a Scattering Time: A Life of Christopher Lasch was published by William B. Eerdmans Publishing Company in 2010.

== Selected works ==
=== Books ===
- 1962: The American Liberals and the Russian Revolution.
- 1965: The New Radicalism in America 1889–1963: The Intellectual As a Social Type.
- 1969: The Agony of the American Left.
- 1973: The World of Nations.
- 1977: Haven in a Heartless World: The Family Besieged.
- 1979: The Culture of Narcissism: American Life in an Age of Diminishing Expectations.
- 1984: The Minimal Self: Psychic Survival in Troubled Times.
- 1991: The True and Only Heaven: Progress and Its Critics.
- 1994: The Revolt of the Elites: And the Betrayal of Democracy, W. W. Norton & Company, ISBN 978-0-39331371-0
- 1997: Women and the Common Life: Love, Marriage, and Feminism.
- 2002: Plain Style: A Guide to Written English.

=== Articles ===
- Lasch, Christopher (August 1958). "The Anti-Imperialists, the Philippines, and the Inequality of Man". Journal of Southern History. 24 (3): 319–31. doi:10.2307/2954987. JSTOR 2954987.
- Lasch, Christopher (June 1962). "American Intervention in Siberia: A Reinterpretation". Political Science Quarterly. 77 (2): 205–23. doi:10.2307/2145870. JSTOR 2145870.
- Lasch, Christopher (1965), "Introduction", in Lasch, Christopher (ed.), In The Social Thought of Jane Addams, Indianapolis: Bobbs-Merrill, pp. xiii–xxvii.
- "Divorce and the Family in America". The Atlantic. November 1966.
- Lasch, Christopher; Fredrickson, George M. (December 1967). "Resistance to Slavery". Civil War History. 13 (4): 315–29. doi:10.1353/cwh.1967.0026. S2CID 145606051.
- "Symposium: Prospects for American Radicalism". New Politics. March 1969.
- "Birth, Death and Technology: The Limits of Cultural Laissez-Faire". The Hastings Center Report. 2 (3). June 1972.
- "Achieving Parody". The Hastings Center Report. 3 (1). February 1973.
- "After the Church the Doctors, After the Doctors Utopia". New York Times Book Review. February 24, 1974.
- "The Suppression Of Clandestine Marriage In England: The Marriage Act Of 1753". Salmagundi. 26. Spring 1974.
- "The Democratization of Culture: A Reappraisal". Change. 7 (6). Summer 1975. The Future of the Humanities
- "The State of the Humanities: A Symposium". Change. 7. Summer 1975.
- "Psychiatry: Call It Teaching or Call It Treatment". The Hastings Center Report. 5 (3). August 1975.
- "The Family as a Haven in a Heartless World". Salmagundi. 35. Fall 1976.
- "The Waning of Private Life". Salmagundi. 36. Winter 1977.
- "Recovering Reality". Salmagundi. 42. Summer–Fall 1978. The Politics of Anti-Realism
- "Lewis Mumford and the Myth of the Machine". Salmagundi. 49. Summer 1980.
- "The Freudian Left and Cultural Revolution". New Left Review. I (129). New Left Review. September–October 1981.
- "The Modernist Myth of the Future". Revue Française d'Études Américaines. 16. February 1983.
- "The Life of Kennedy's Death". Harper's Magazine. October 1983.
- "The Degradation of Work and the Apotheosis of Art". Harper's Magazine. February 1984.
- "1984: Are We There?". Salmagundi. 65. Fall 1984.
- "The Politics of Nostalgia". Harper's Magazine. November 1984.
- "Historical Sociology and the Myth of Maturity". Theory and Society. 14 (5). September 1985.
- "A Typology of Intellectuals". Salmagundi. 70–71. Spring–Summer 1986. Intellectuals
- "A Typology of Intellectuals: II. The Example of C. Wright Mills". Salmagundi. 70–71: 102–7. Spring–Summer 1986.
- "A Typology of Intellectuals: III Melanie Klein, Psychoanalysis, and The Revival of Public Philosophy". Salmagundi. 70–71. Spring–Summer 1986.
- "Traditional Values". Harper's Magazine. September 1986.
- "The New Feminist Intellectual: A Discussion". Salmagundi. 70–71. Spring–Summer 1986. Intellectuals.
- "The Communitarian Critique of Liberalism". Soundings: An Interdisciplinary Journal. 69 (1–2). Spring–Summer 1986. Symposium: Habits of The Heart.
- "Fraternalist Manifesto". Harper's Magazine. April 1987.
- "What's Wrong with the Right?". Tikkun. I. 1987. Archived from the original on March 17, 2004.
- "Politics American Style". Salmagundi. 78–79. Spring–Summer 1988.
- "The Class of '54, Thirty-Five Years Later". Salmagundi. 84. Fall 1989.
- "Consensus: An Academic Question?". The Journal of American History. 76 (2). September 1989.
- "Counting by Tens". Salmagundi. 81. Winter 1989.
- "Conservatism Against Itself". First Things. April 1990.
- "Memory and Nostalgia, Gratitude and Pathos". Salmagundi. 85–86. Winter–Spring 1990.
- "Religious Contributions to Social Movements: Walter Rauschenbusch, the Social Gospel, and Its Critics". Journal of Religious Ethics. 18: 7–25. Spring 1990.
- "The Lost Art of Political Argument". Harper's Magazine. September 1990.
- "Academic Pseudo-Radicalism: The Charade of "Subversion"". Salmagundi, 25th Anniversary Issue. 88–89. Fall 1990.
- "Liberalism and Civic Virtue". Telos. 88. New York. Summer 1991.
- "The Fragility of Liberalism". Salmagundi. 92. Fall 1991.
- "The Illusion of Disillusionment". Harper's Magazine. July 1991.
- "Gnosticism, Ancient and Modern: The Religion of the Future?". Salmagundi. 96. Fall 1992.
- "Communitarianism or Populism?". New Oxford Review. May 1992. Archived from the original on July 16, 2014.
- Lasch, Christopher (August 10, 1992). "For Shame: Why Americans Should Be Wary of Self-Esteem". New Republic.
- "Hillary Clinton, Child Saver". Harper's Magazine. October 1992.
- Lasch, Christopher (1993), "The Culture of Consumption", in Kupiec Cayton, Mary; Gorn, Elliott J.; Williams, Peter W. (eds.), Encyclopedia of American Social History, vol. 2 (of 3), New York: Charles Scribner's Sons, pp. 1381–90.
- "The Culture of Poverty and the Culture of 'Compassion'". Salmagundi. 98–99. Spring–Summer 1993.
- Blake, Casey; Phelps, Christopher (March 1994). "History as Social Criticism: Conversations with Christopher Lasch". Journal of American History. 80 (4): 1310–32. doi:10.2307/2080602. JSTOR 2080602. Interview.
- "The Revolt of the Elites: Have they Canceled their Allegiance to America?". Harper's Magazine. November 1994.

== See also ==
- Christopher Caldwell (journalist)
- Cultural narcissism
- Rhetoric of therapy
