= Hope in a Scattering Time =

2010 biography by Eric Miller

- Author: Eric Miller
- Language: English
- Subject: Christopher Lasch
- Genre: biography
- Publisher: William B. Eerdmans Publishing Company
- Publication date: April 16, 2010
- Publication place: United States
- Pages: 394
- ISBN: 978-0-8028-1769-3

Hope in a Scattering Time: A Life of Christopher Lasch is a biography about the American historian and social critic Christopher Lasch. It was written by the American Eric Miller and published by William B. Eerdmans Publishing Company in 2010. Bookforum called it a "supple and observant intellectual biography" that "suffers in spots from omissions and misplaced points of emphasis".
