= Anti-intellectualism in American Life =

1963 book by Richard Hofstadter

- First edition
- Author: Richard Hofstadter
- Language: English
- Subject: Intellectualism
- Publisher: Knopf
- Publication date: 1963
- Publication place: United States
- Pages: 434
- Awards: Pulitzer Prize for General Nonfiction (1964)
- OCLC: 268837
- Dewey Decimal: 917.3
- LC Class: E169.1 .H74

Anti-intellectualism in American Life is a book by Richard Hofstadter published in 1963 that won the 1964 Pulitzer Prize for General Nonfiction.

== Summary ==
In this book, Hofstadter set out to trace the social movements that altered the role of intellect in American society. In so doing, he explored questions regarding the purpose of education and whether the democratization of education altered that purpose and reshaped its form.

== Analysis ==
In considering the historic tension between access to education and excellence in education, Hofstadter argued that both anti-intellectualism and utilitarianism were in part consequences of the democratization of knowledge. Moreover, he saw these themes as historically embedded in America's national fabric, resulting from its colonial and evangelical Protestant heritage. He contended that evangelical American Protestantism's anti-intellectual tradition valued the spirit over intellectual rigor.

== Definition ==
Hofstadter described anti-intellectualism as "resentment of the life of the mind, and those who are considered to represent it; and a disposition to constantly minimize the value of that life." He further described the term as a view that "intellectuals...are pretentious, conceited... and snobbish; and very likely immoral, dangerous, and subversive ... The plain sense of the common man is an altogether adequate substitute for, if not actually much superior to, formal knowledge and expertise."
