= Post, Oregon =

Unincorporated community in Oregon, US

- Unincorporated community
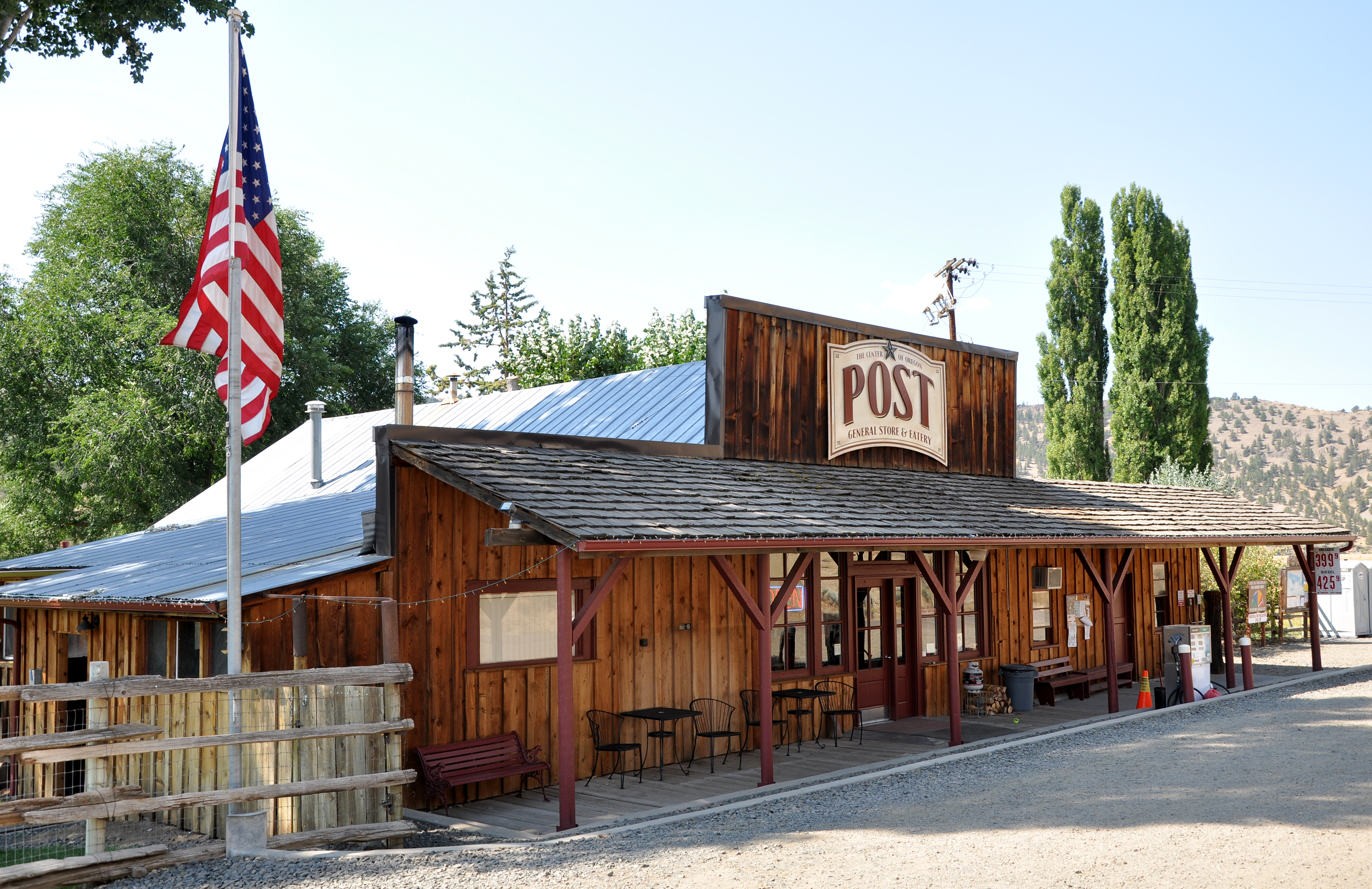
- General store in Post

- Location within the state of Oregon Post (the United States)
- Coordinates: 44°09′25″N 120°29′26″W
- Country: United States
- State: Oregon
- County: Crook
- Established: 1889
- Elevation: 3,383 ft (1,031 m)
- Time zone: UTC-8 (Pacific)
  - Summer (DST): UTC-7 (Pacific)
- ZIP code: 97752
- Area code: 541
- Coordinates and elevation from United States Geological Survey

Post is an unincorporated community in Crook County, Oregon, United States. It has a post office assigned the ZIP code of 97752. Post lies along Oregon Route 380 southeast of Prineville at an elevation of 3,383 feet (1,031 m). Post was named for Walter H. Post, the first postmaster of the Post post office, established in 1889.

== Climate ==
This region experiences warm (but not hot) and dry summers, with no average monthly temperatures above about 66 °F (19 °C). According to the Köppen Climate Classification system, Post has a warm-summer Mediterranean climate, abbreviated "Csb" on climate maps. However, the average temperature in January is about 29 °F (−2 °C), and Post gets only about 13 inches (330 mm) of precipitation a year. Snowfall amounts to an average of about 42 inches (110 cm) annually.

== Notable residents ==
Author and school teacher Alice Day Pratt lived near Post on her homestead, Broadview, from 1912 through 1930.

== Works cited ==
- Shirley, Gayle C. (1998). More Than Petticoats: Remarkable Oregon Women. Helena, Montana: Falcon Publishing. ISBN 1-56044-668-4.
