= Robert C. Bannister =

American historian (born 1935)

Robert Corwin Bannister Jr. (born June 4, 1935) is an American historian. Bannister was a professor at Swarthmore College in Philadelphia. His focus was on American culture in the 19th and 20th centuries, reform movements, and the history of sociology, as well as Social Darwinism. Bannister has written five books and published numerous articles and reviews.

He reviewed Russell Jacoby's The Last Intellectuals: American Culture in the Age of Academe.

== Bibliography ==
- Ray Stannard Baker: The Mind and Thought of a Progressive (Yale University Press 1966; reissued Garland, 1979).
- American Values in Transition (editor), (Harcourt-Brace, 1972).
- Social Darwinism: Science and Myth in Anglo-American Social Thought (Temple University Press, 1979). Reissued as Social Darwinism: Science and Myth (Temple Press, 1988).
- Sociology and Scientism: The American Search for Objectivity 1880-1940 (University of North Carolina, 1987).
- Jessie Bernard: The Making of a Feminist (Rutgers University Press, 1991)
- On Liberty, Society, and Politics: The Essential Essays of William Graham Sumner (Liberty Fund Press, 1992)
