= The Culture of Narcissism =

1979 book by Christopher Lasch

The Culture of Narcissism: American Life in an Age of Diminishing Expectations
- Cover of the first edition
- Author: Christopher Lasch
- Language: English
- Subject: Culture of the United States
- Publisher: W. W. Norton
- Publication date: 1979
- Publication place: United States
- Media type: Print (hardback and paperback)

The Culture of Narcissism: American Life in an Age of Diminishing Expectations (1979), by Christopher Lasch, is a psychological and cultural, artistic and historical synthesis that explores the roots and ramifications of the normalization of pathological narcissism in 20th-century American culture. For the mass-market edition published in September of the same year, Lasch won the 1980 US National Book Award in the category Current Interest (paperback). (Note: From 1980 to 1983 in National Book Award history there were dual awards for hardcover and paperback books in many categories. Most of the paperback award-winners were reprints, including this one, but its first edition was eligible only in the same award year.)

== Summary ==
Lasch proposes that since World War II, America has produced a personality-type consistent with clinical definitions of "pathological narcissism". This pathology is not akin to everyday narcissism, a hedonistic egoism, but with clinical diagnosis of narcissistic personality disorder. For Lasch, "pathology represents a heightened version of normality." He locates symptoms of this personality disorder in the radical political movements of the 1960s (such as the Weather Underground), as well as in the spiritual cults and movements of the 1970s, from est to Rolfing.

== Reaction ==
An early response to The Culture of Narcissism commented that Lasch had identified the outcomes in American society of the decline of the family over the previous century. The book quickly became a bestseller and a talking point, being further propelled to success after Lasch notably visited Camp David to advise President Jimmy Carter for his "crisis of confidence" speech of July 15, 1979. Later editions include a new afterword, "The Culture of Narcissism Revisited".

Author Louis Menand argues that the book has been commonly misused by liberals and conservatives alike, who cited it for their own ideological agendas. Menand wrote:

Lasch was not saying that things were better in the 1950s, as conservatives offended by countercultural permissiveness probably took him to be saying. He was not saying that things were better in the 1960s, as former activists disgusted by the 'me-ism' of the seventies are likely to have imagined. He was diagnosing a condition that he believed had originated in the nineteenth century.

Lasch attempted to correct many of these misapprehensions with The Minimal Self in 1984.

== Some editions ==
- New York: Norton, 1979. ISBN 0-393-01177-1
- New York: Warner Books, 1980. ISBN 0-446-97495-1
- New York: Norton; Revised edition (May 1991). ISBN 978-0-393-30738-2

== See also ==
- The Age of Entitlement (2020)
- Narcissism § Cultural narcissism
