= The American Political Tradition =

1948 book by Richard Hofstadter

- Paperback edition (publ. Vintage Books, 1948)
- Author: Richard Hofstadter
- Language: English
- Subject: American politics
- Publisher: A. A. Knopf
- Publication date: 1948
- Publication place: United States
- LC Class: E178 .H727

The American Political Tradition and the Men Who Made It is a 1948 book by Richard Hofstadter, an account of the ideology of previous Presidents of the United States and other political figures.

== Contents ==
Hofstadter wrote the book with the support of a fellowship from his publisher, Alfred A. Knopf, Inc., which was "awarded to projects containing the promise of trustworthy scholarship combined with literary distinction of the kind that means some breadth of appeal."

Hofstadter's introduction argues that the major political traditions in the United States, despite contentious battles, have all "shared a belief in the rights of property, the philosophy of economic individualism, the value of competition ... [T]hey have accepted the economic virtues of a capitalist culture as necessary qualities of man."

Rather than focusing on political conflict, Hofstadter proposes that a common ideology of "self-help, free enterprise, competition, and beneficent cupidity" has guided the United States since its inception. Through analyses of the ruling class in the U.S., Hofstadter argues that this consensus is the hallmark of political life in the U.S.

Part of Hofstadter's argument is to undermine the democratic credentials of politicians mythologized by historians, calling for reflection rather than nostalgia. Thomas Jefferson is presented as an ambiguous figure, an agrarian radical whose "laissez-faire became the political economy of the most conservative thinkers in the country".

Andrew Jackson's democracy is also characterized as "a phase in the expansion of liberated capitalism", and Progressive trustbuster Theodore Roosevelt, though he "despised the rich", is described by Hofstadter as a conservative frightened by "any sign of organized power among the people". Hofstadter also writes that Franklin D. Roosevelt's New Deal – an amalgam of "improvised" programs – was "far from being intrinsically progressive, [easily] capable of being adapted to very conservative purposes", but had nonetheless "revived American liberalism".

The book describes the Emancipation Proclamation as having "had all the moral grandeur of a bill of lading" and "declar[ing] free all slaves ... precisely where its effect could not reach."
