= Thomas R. Cole =

American historian

Thomas R. Cole (born March 15, 1949) is an American writer, historian, filmmaker, and gerontologist. He is currently the Director of the Center for Spiritual Direction at Congregation Beth Israel in Houston as well as an Emeritus Professor at the McGovern Center for Humanities and Ethics.

== Biography ==
Cole was born into a Jewish family in New Haven, Connecticut. His father, Burton David Michel, died in a car accident in September 1953, when Cole was 4 years old. His father's death prompted a lifelong personal and academic inquiry into issues of spirituality, aging, and the question of what it means to grow old.

Cole married Letha Birkholtz in 1972 and had two children, Jacob and Emma. He was divorced and married Thelma Jean Goodrich in 2007. They live in Houston.

== Education ==
Cole studied philosophy as an undergraduate at Yale University. He graduated in 1971 under the mentorship of philosopher of religion Merold Westphal and political philosopher William McBride. He earned a master's degree in American intellectual history under the direction of Donald Meyer at Wesleyan University (1975) and a Ph.D. in history under the mentorship of Christopher Lasch at the University of Rochester (1980). His dissertation examined the history of aging in middle-class America in mid-19th and early 20th centuries.

== Academic career ==
In 1982 Cole became a professor at UTMB Galveston, where he assisted his mentor, Ronald Carson, in developing the nation's first Ph.D. Program in medical humanities.

His 1993 book, The Journey of Life: A Cultural History of Aging in America examined the tradition of European thought and art about aging, traced its evolution in America, and emphasized the absence of social and cultural meaning in later life.

In 1997 Cole wrote No Color is My Kind, the story of Eldrewey Stearns and the integration of Houston.

Cole and his student at the time, Kate de Medeiros, taught Life Story Writing Workshops to groups of elders in Galveston from 1998 to 2003. The PBS film Life Stories was made about the workshops.

In 2004 Cole became the founding director of the McGovern Center for Humanities and Ethics. With Ronald Carson and Nathan Carlin, he co-authored Medical Humanities: An Introduction.

In 2018 Cole began training to become a Spiritual Director under Rabbi James Ponet. He was ordained in 2021 by Rabbi Ponet, Rabbi David Lyon, Rabbi Richard Address, Dr. Catherine Stephenson, Reverend Laura Mayo, and Dr. Thelma Jean Goodrich. In 2021, he founded Congregation Beth Israel's Center for Healing, Hope, and the Human Spirit with Rabbi David Lyon and began working as a Spiritual Director at Temple Beth Israel in Houston.

Cole is currently completing a spiritual memoir, tentatively entitled My Journey to the Angels: Towards A Spiritual Renewal.

== Published works ==
=== Books ===
- No Color Is My Kind: The Life of Eldrewey Stearns and the Integration of Houston, Texas. 1997. 2nd edition, University of Texas Press, 2021.
- The Journey of Life: A Cultural History of Aging. New York: Cambridge University Press, 1992.
- The Brewsters. The University of Texas Health Science Center at Houston (UTHealth), August 2011.
- Medical Humanities: An Introduction. Cambridge University Press, 2014.
- Old Man Country: My Search for Meaning Among the Elders. Oxford University Press, 2019.

=== Documentary films ===
- The Strange Demise of Jim Crow (1998)
- Still Life: The Humanity of Anatomy (2001)
- Life Stories: Aging and the Human Spirit (2001)
- Stroke: Conversations and Explanations (2007).

=== Edited collections ===
What Does It Mean to Grow Old? Reflections from the Humanities. Durham, NC: Duke University Press, 1986.

Where Do We Come From? What Are We? Where Are We Going?: An Annotated Bibliography of Aging and the Humanities. Washington, D.C.: Gerontological Society of America, 1988.

Handbook of the Humanities and Aging. Springer Publishing Co., 1992.

Voices and Visions of Aging: a Critical Gerontology. Springer Publishing Co., 1993.

The Oxford Book of Aging. Oxford University Press, 1994.

Handbook of the Humanities and Aging. Springer Publishing Co., 1999.

Practicing the Medical Humanities: Forms of Engagement. University Publishing Group, 2003.

Faculty Health in Academic Medicine: Physicians, Scientists, and the Pressures of Success. Totowa, NJ: Humana Press, 2009.

A Guide to Humanistic Studies in Aging. Johns Hopkins University Press, 2009.

Critical Humanities and Ageing: Forging Interdisciplinary Dialogues. New York, NY: Routledge, 2022.
