= Foreign policy of the Clinton administration =

Overview of United States foreign policy from 1993 to 2001

The foreign policy of the Bill Clinton administration was of secondary concern to a president fixed on domestic policy. Clinton relied chiefly on his two experienced Secretaries of State Warren Christopher (1993–1997) and Madeleine Albright (1997–2001), as well as Vice President Al Gore. The Cold War had ended and the Dissolution of the Soviet Union had taken place under his predecessor President George H. W. Bush, whom Clinton criticized for being too preoccupied with foreign affairs. The United States was the only remaining superpower, with a military strength far overshadowing the rest of the world. There were tensions with countries such as Iran and North Korea, but no visible threats. Clinton's main priority was always domestic affairs, especially economics. Foreign-policy was chiefly of interest to him in terms of promoting American trade. His administration signed more than 300 bilateral trade agreements. His emergencies had to do with humanitarian crises which raised the issue of American or NATO or United Nations interventions to protect civilians, or armed humanitarian intervention, as the result of civil war, state collapse, or oppressive governments.

President George H. W. Bush had sent American troops on a humanitarian mission to Somalia in December 1992. 18 of them were killed and 80 wounded in a botched raid, ordered by the commanding general, in October 1993. Public opinion, and most elite opinion, swung heavily against foreign interventions that risked the lives of American soldiers when American national interests were not directly involved. That meant humanitarian missions were problematic. Clinton agreed, and sent ground troops only once, to Haiti, where none were hurt. He sent the Air Force to intervene in the Yugoslav Wars, but no American crewmen were lost. The major trouble spots during his two terms were in Africa (Somalia and Rwanda) and Eastern Europe (Bosnia, Herzegovina, and Kosovo in the former Yugoslavia). Clinton also tried to resolve long-running conflicts in Northern Ireland, and the Middle East, particularly the Israeli–Palestinian conflict.

Key achievements during the second term included the 1995 peso recovery package in Mexico, NATO enlargement, the 1998 bombing of Iraq, the Dayton Accords that ended the killing in Bosnia, the NATO bombing campaign against Yugoslavia that stopped the ethnic cleansing in Kosovo, the Good Friday Agreement that brought peace in Northern Ireland, and the administration's policy of engagement with the People's Republic of China.

== Appointments ==
Clinton's 1997 foreign policy team

Al Gore

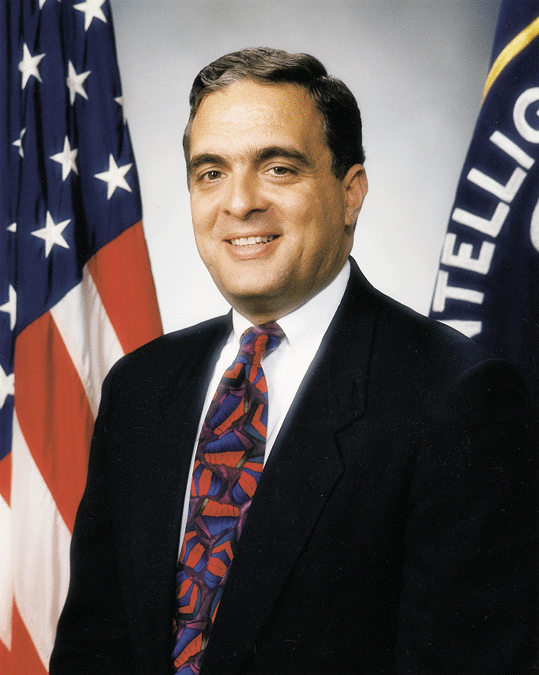
George Tenet

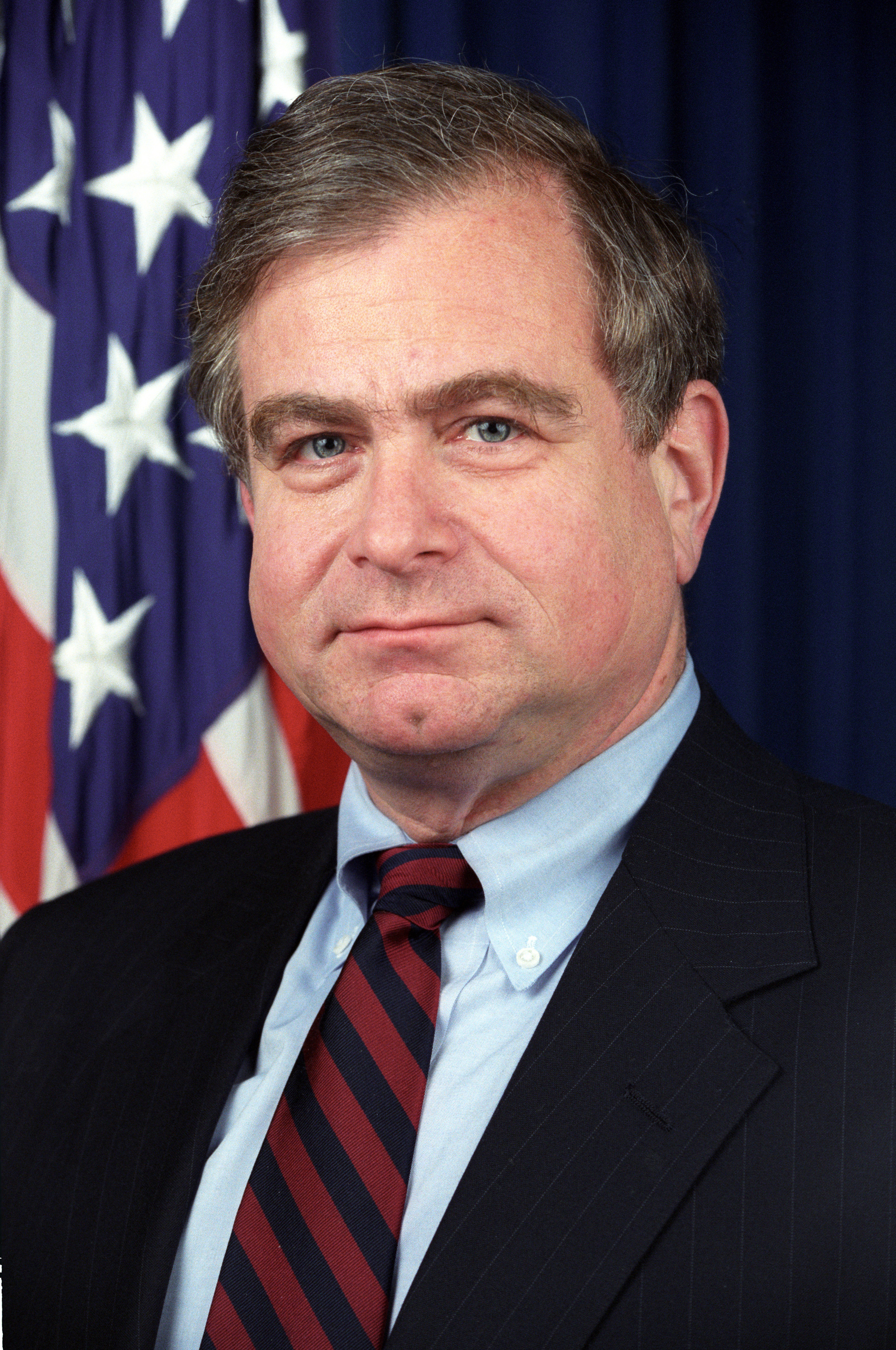
Sandy Berger

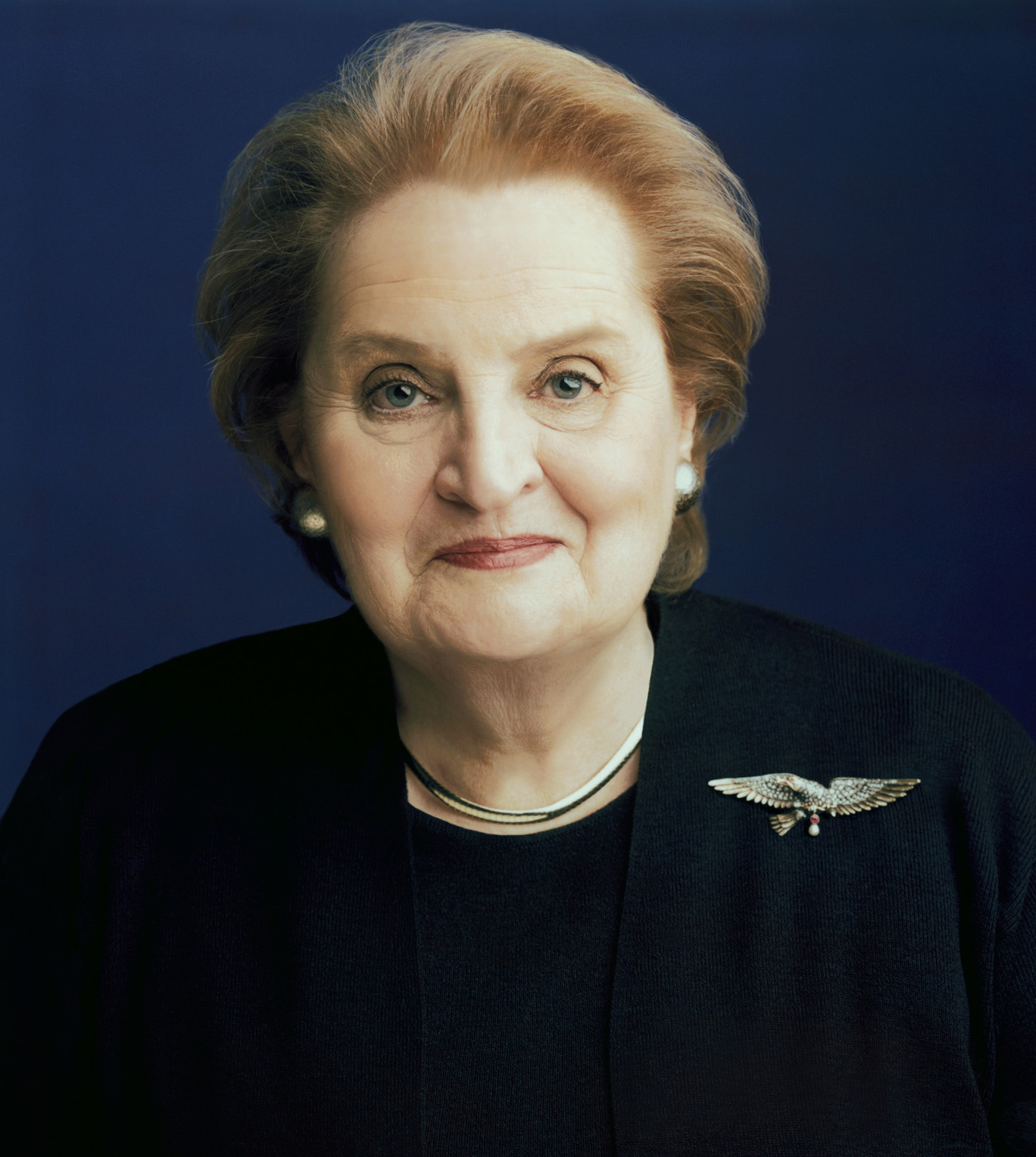
Madeleine Albright

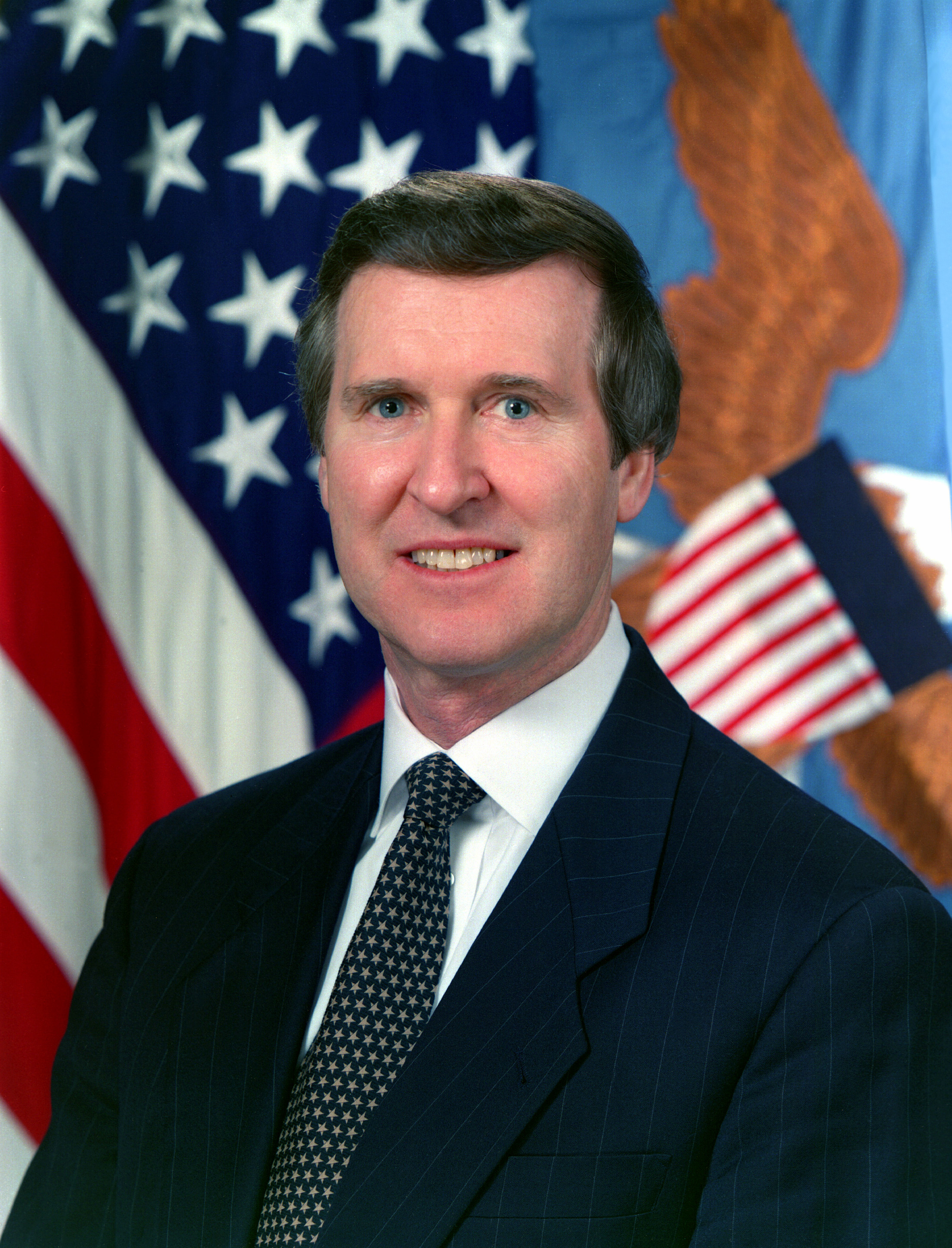
William Cohen

Clinton administration foreign policy personnel
Vice President	Gore (1993–2001)						
Secretary of State	Christopher (1993–1997)				Albright (1997–2001)		
Secretary of Defense	Aspin (1993–1994)	Perry (1994–1997)			Cohen (1997–2001)		
Ambassador to the United Nations	Albright (1993–1997)				Richardson (1997–1998)	Burleigh (1998–1999)	Holbrooke (1999–2001)
Director of Central Intelligence	Studeman (1993)	Woolsey (1993–1995)	Studeman (1995)	Deutch (1995–1996)	Tenet (1996–2001)		
Assistant to the President for National Security Affairs	Lake (1993–1997)				Berger (1997–2001)		
Deputy Assistant to the President for National Security Affairs	Berger (1993–1997)				Steinberg (1997–2001)		
Trade Representative	Kantor (1993–1996)				Barshefsky (1996–2001)		

== Top advisors ==
As a campaigner for election, Clinton promised to devote his main attention to domestic policy, in contrast to what he called the overemphasis on foreign policies by his opponent George H. W. Bush. On taking office he told his top advisers he could only spare one hour a week meeting with them. However, Clinton had attended graduate school in England, and increasingly took a personal interest in foreign affairs, especially in his second term. His main foreign policy advisors were Secretaries of State Warren M. Christopher and Madeleine Albright and National Security Advisors Anthony Lake and Sandy Berger. Other key advisors include Secretary of Defense Les Aspin, and Strobe Talbott who as Ambassador at large dealt with Russia and India.

Political scientist Stephen Schlesinger argues that Warren Christopher was:

a cautious, discreet, and patient counselor who, reflecting his habits as a corporate lawyer, made few very bold moves without his client's [Clinton's] prior approval....Albright, is a more outspoken, even swashbuckling, character, who tends to grab hold of issues and run with them--even if this means stepping on the feet of others in the administration or foreign officials. The result has been a more activist regime in the second term.

=== Main goals ===
According to Sandy Berger, Clinton's top advisor for national security, the president had three main goals: to assert American hegemonic leadership; promote American prosperity and expand the market economy globally; and to advance human rights and democracy. Berger argues that Clinton achieved above-average successes in five areas:

- Working alliances in Europe and Asia, with emphasis on NATO, Japan and South Korea.
- Friendly relations with China and Russia, until recently our great enemies.
- He viewed local conflicts in continental and global perspective.
- New technology has altered military consideration and made nuclear nonproliferation a priority along with control of chemical and biological weapons.
- He integrated foreign-policy with economic goals of prosperity and extended trade.

=== Favorable world scene ===
For the first time since the mid-1930s the international scene was highly favorable. Old enemies had collapsed with the fall of Communism and the Soviet Union. Other problems seemed far less pressing and Clinton, with little expertise in foreign affairs, was eager to concentrate almost entirely on domestic issues. as Walter B. Slocombe argues:

Germany...had been reunified peacefully and its partners in the European Union were moving toward economic integration with political integration a long-term, but now less implausible, prospect. The former Warsaw Pact satellites were on the way to stable democracy and market prosperity. North and South Korea had agreed on a process of denuclearization. China seemed absorbed in its internal development, having cast off revolutionary zeal in exchange for growth (and continued regime control) under market principles....Iraq was humbled by recent defeat in the Gulf War and under pervasive international surveillance and supervision. Apartheid was ending in South Africa, and peacefully so. Most of Latin America was emerging from rule by juntas and coups to democratic order. Taiwan and South Korea had cast off authoritarian regimes while remaining strong friends of the United States. Even in the Middle East, the Madrid agreements appeared to open the path to resolution of the Israel-Palestine problem.

Less attention was being paid to the remaining minor trouble spots, as Slocombe lists them:

Iran, Haiti, the wreckage of Yugoslavia, the seemingly endless tragedy of Africa exemplified by the chaos in Somalia, and even Northern Ireland, as well as nontraditional security challenges ranging from environmental degradation to terrorism.

== International trips ==
Countries visited by President Clinton during his time in office

The number of visits per country where he traveled are:

- One visit to Albania, Argentina, Australia, Austria, Bangladesh, Barbados, Belarus, Botswana, Brazil, Brunei, Bulgaria, Chile, China, Colombia, Costa Rica, Croatia, Czech Republic, Denmark, El Salvador, Finland, Ghana, Greece, Guatemala, Haiti, Honduras, Hungary, India, Indonesia, Kosovo, Kuwait, Latvia, Macedonia, Morocco, Netherlands, New Zealand, Nicaragua, Nigeria, Norway, Oman, Pakistan, Palestinian Authority (West Bank and Gaza), Portugal, Romania, Rwanda, Saudi Arabia, Senegal, Slovakia, Slovenia, South Africa, Syria, Tanzania, Thailand, Turkey, Uganda, Vatican City, Venezuela, and Vietnam
- Two visits to Belgium, Jordan, Mexico, Philippines, Poland, and Spain
- Three visits to Bosnia and Herzegovina, Ireland, South Korea, and Ukraine
- Four visits to Egypt and Israel
- Five visits to Canada, France, Japan, Russia, and Switzerland
- Six visits to Germany
- Seven visits to United Kingdom
- Eight visits to Italy

== International trade ==
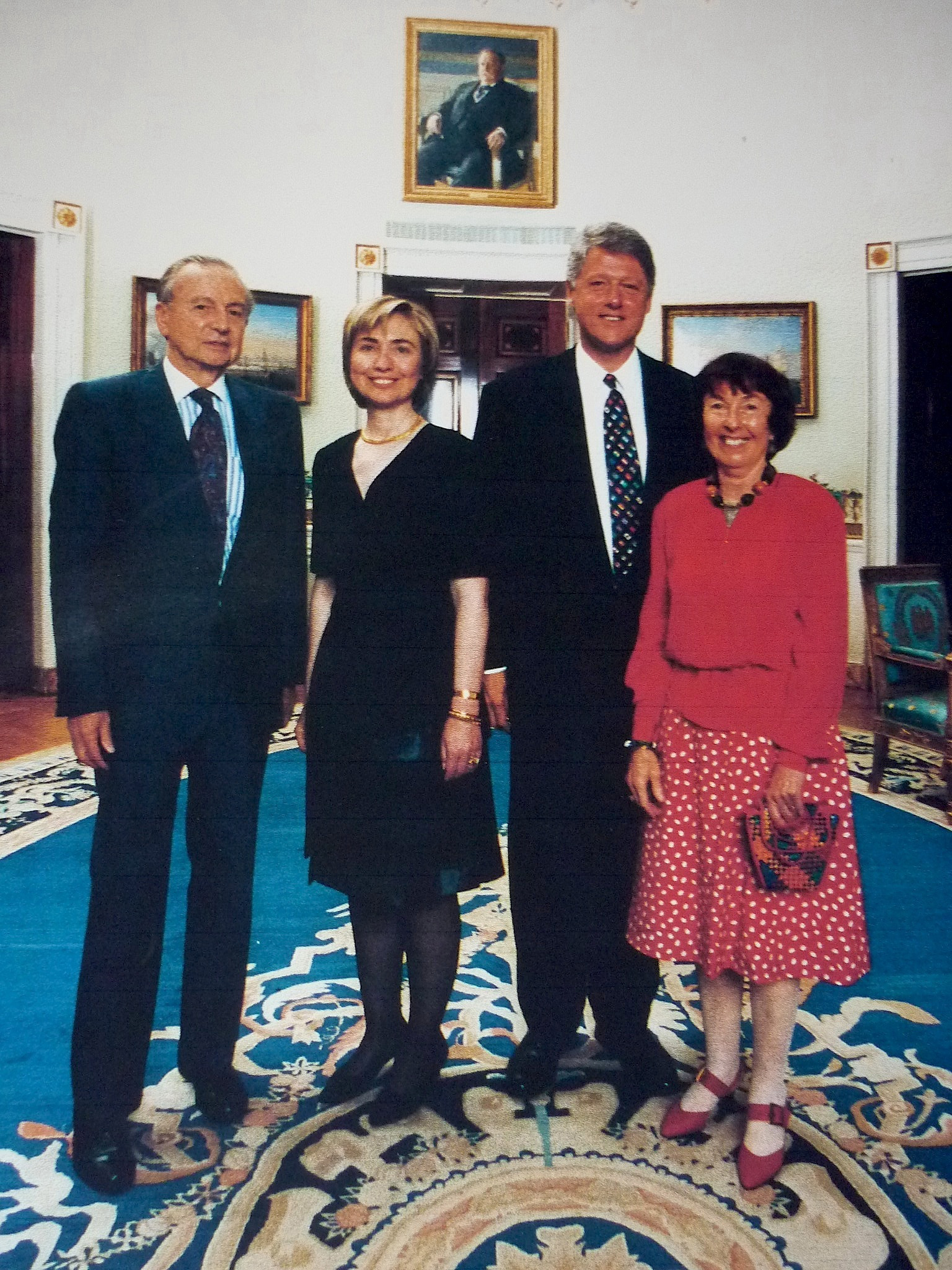
Clinton and Ambassador Harry Schwarz, who negotiated lifting the remaining sanctions on South Africa

Clinton made the completion and implementation of North American Free Trade Agreement his top trade priority. He also supported the establishment and expansion of the World Trade Organization (WTO), which replaced the General Agreement on Tariffs and Trade (GATT) as the primary global institution overseeing international trade.

Clinton sought to open foreign markets to American goods and services through trade negotiations and agreements. Efforts were made to reduce tariffs, eliminate non-tariff barriers, and ensure fair trade practices to create opportunities for U.S. exporters. On these points Secretary of Commerce Ronald H. Brown took the lead. He led delegations of entrepreneurs, businessmen and financiers to South Africa, Mexico, Saudi Arabia, Jordan, Israel, the West Bank, Gaza, Egypt, Russia, Brazil, Argentina and Chile, China and Hong Kong, Ireland India and Senegal. He was on a trade mission to war-torn Yugoslavia in 1996 when they all died in an accidental plane crash. A special prosecutor was appointed when it was alleged that contributions to the Democratic Party enabled one to join the trade party. Over its eight years in office, the administration signed 300 trade agreements with other countries. US trade reached $2.6 trillion in 2000, up 42% from $1.83 trillion in 1996.

=== China ===
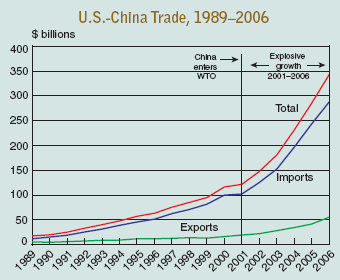
History of US trade with China

The administration pursued a policy towards China that sought to engage and integrate China into the global community while simultaneously addressing concerns about human rights and trade imbalances. The Chinese communist regime had crushed the pro-democracy movement at Tiananmen Square in 1989. President Bush voiced American outrage, but quietly reassured the Chinese that trade would continue. In the 1992 election campaign, Clinton criticized Bush for not punishing China more. As a presidential candidate Clinton adopted the position of congressional Democrats, who strongly attack Bush for prioritizing profitable trade over the promotion of human rights.

However, as President Clinton continued the Bush trade policies. Clinton's highest priority was to maintain trade with China, boost American exports, expand investment in the huge Chinese market, and create more jobs at home. By granting China temporary most favoured nation status in 1993, his administration minimized tariff levels in Chinese imports. Clinton initially conditioned extension of this status on Chinese human rights reforms, but ultimately decided to extend the status despite a lack of reform in the specified areas of free emigration, no exportation of goods made with prison labor, release of peaceful protesters, treatment of prisoners in terms of international human rights, recognition of the distinct regional culture of type at, permitting international television and radio coverage, and observation of human rights specified by United Nations resolutions.

In 1998, Clinton paid a friendly nine-day visit to China. Albright defended the trip by saying, "Engagement does not mean endorsement." In 1999 Clinton signed a landmark trade agreement with China. The agreement–the result of more than a decade of negotiations–would lower many trade barriers between the two countries, making it easier to export U.S. products such as automobiles, banking services, and motion pictures. The Chinese citizens ability to afford and purchase U.S. goods should have been taken into consideration. However, the agreement could only take effect if China was accepted into the WTO and was granted permanent "normal trade relations" status by the U.S. Congress. Under the pact, the United States would support China's membership in the WTO. Many Democrats as well as Republicans were reluctant to grant permanent status to China because they were concerned about human rights in the country and the impact of Chinese imports on U.S. industries and jobs. Congress, however, voted in 2000 to grant permanent normal trade relations with China. In 2000, Clinton signed a bill granting permanent normal trade relations to China, and American imports from China massively increased in the subsequent years. Clinton's last treasury secretary, Lawrence Summers, argued that Clinton's trade policies were technically "the largest tax cut in the history of the world" in that they reduced prices on consumer goods by lowering tariffs.

=== NAFTA: Canada and Mexico ===
In 1993 Clinton worked with a bipartisan coalition in Congress to overcome objections by labor union and liberal Democrats. They passed the North American Free Trade Agreement (NAFTA) that Bush had negotiated with Canada and Mexico in 1992. It joined the American, Mexican and Canadian economies in a free trade pact. It removed many restrictions of trade in agriculture, textiles, and automobiles, provided new protections for intellectual property, set up dispute resolution mechanisms, and implemented new labor and environmental safeguards. NAFTA cost jobs at first, but in the long run it dramatically increased the trade among the three countries. It increased the number of jobs in the United States, but unions complained that it lowered wage rates for some workers. However, unions blocked his 1997 and 1998 proposals to provide the president with the power to quickly negotiate trade liberalization pacts with limited congressional comment. Clinton's advocacy of trade agreements sparked a backlash on the left among opponents of globalization. A 1999 World Trade Organization meeting in Seattle, Washington, was overshadowed by major protests that descended into violence.

== International organizations ==
The end of superpower rivalry had freed the UN and NATO and regional security institutions from their previous Cold War mind-set, and created new opportunities for them to play a more active, collective role. Despite international norms of state sovereignty and non-intervention, the idea that the international community should intervene in a country for the good of its own people gained greater legitimacy. International organizations such as the UN and regional security such as NATO, the OAS, and the OAU would play a role in bestowing legitimacy on the operations and in organizing a collective response. Domestically however, these new developments at the international level became enmeshed with a long-standing struggle between Congress and the president over war powers, and differences in treaties between domestic and international understandings of the term. Which branch of government was to control the deployment of American troops occupied these debates almost as much as the merits of the individual interventions. These debates were not new, with the struggle over war powers being a constant feature of American foreign policy, especially since WWII when it first gained superpower status, joined international organizations, and signed its first mutual defense treaty in more than 150 years. Clinton would utilize both the multi-national cast and the explicit blessing of international organizations for support in most of these involvements. These largely humanitarian operations during his term met much more congressional opposition, and enjoyed less frequent congressional authorization, than did operations during the Cold War. This involvement suggests that the president had found international organizations to be a useful ally in part to decrease and to overcome the resistance of the national legislature. In October 1997, Clinton declined to sign the Ottawa Treaty banning land mines.

=== Genocide, war crimes, and UN peacekeeping ===
Embarrassed by its slow response to Rwanda, Kosovo showed Clinton his administration had to be prepared to deal with genocide and war crimes. It recognized some conflicts as genocidal, helped organize military force, and supported the International Criminal Court treaty. Finally it established the Atrocities Prevention Interagency Working Group, the forerunner of the Obama administration's Atrocities Prevention Board.

The Clinton administration and the George W. Bush administration that followed adopted similar policies in support of UN peace operations, supporting an increase in scale and number of UN missions, while being reluctant to contribute large contingents of ground troops to UN-commanded operations.

=== Vetoing second term of secretary-general ===
Boutros Boutros-Ghali ran unopposed for the customary second term as UN Secretary-general in 1996. US ambassador Madeleine Albright denounced him as "disengaged" and "neglect[ful]" of genocide in Rwanda.and demanded Boutros-Ghali resign. He refused and seemingly had the votes. He won 14 of the 15 votes in the Security Council, but the sole opposing vote was a US veto. After four deadlocked meetings of the Security Council, France offered a compromise in which Boutros-Ghali would be appointed to a short term of two years, but the United States rejected the French offer. Finally, Boutros-Ghali suspended his candidacy, becoming the second secretary-general ever to be denied re-election by a veto, with Kurt Waldheim being the first.

== Africa ==
=== Somalia ===
In December 1992, President Bush sent troops to Somalia. This intervention, called Operation Restore Hope, saw U.S. forces assuming the unified command in accordance with United Nations Security Council Resolution 794 with the intent to facilitate airlifted humanitarian supplies and prevent the items from falling into the hands of regional warlords. Following Clinton's assumption of the Presidency, his administration shifted the objectives set out in Operation Restore Hope and began pursuing a policy of attempting to neutralize the Somali Warlords, in particular Mohamed Farrah Aidid, as part of the second phase of the United Nations' intervention in the country, known as UNOSOM II. It was during UNOSOM II the Battle of Mogadishu occurred, resulting in the death of 19 American Servicemen. Following these deaths, the mission quickly lost popularity with the American people. Fearing chaos resulting in the starvation of Somalia's civilians and to help U.S. Forces defend themselves, Clinton increased troop presence in the country. The mission remained unpopular, however. Following a national security policy review session held in the White House on October 6, 1993, Clinton directed the acting chairman of the Joint Chiefs of Staff, Admiral David E. Jeremiah, to stop all actions by U.S. forces against Aidid except those required in self-defense. He reappointed Ambassador Robert B. Oakley as special envoy to Somalia in an attempt to broker a peace settlement and then announced that all U.S. forces would withdraw from Somalia no later than March 31, 1994. On December 15, 1993, U.S. Secretary of Defense Les Aspin stepped down, taking much of the blame for his decision to refuse requests for tanks and armored vehicles in support of the mission. American opinion became strongly opposed to sending American ground troops on combat missions, and while Clinton seemingly agreed, he continued sending US forces abroad, intervening in places such as Haiti, Yugoslavia, Sudan, and Iraq.

=== Rwanda ===
In April 1994, genocide in Rwanda erupted due to a long-standing conflict between the majority Hutu and dominant Tutsi ethnic groups. In little more than 100 days, Hutu militia massacred about 800,000 Tutsi men, women and children. The small UN force on the scene was helpless. European nations flew in to remove their own nationals, then flew out. There was a strong consensus in the United States at both the elite and popular levels that the United States should not send in large-scale combat forces to stop the massacres. American officials avoided the word "genocide" because that would justify military intervention. Clinton later called his inaction his worst mistake.

The Hutu militia were highly effective in killing Tutsi civilians, but they were ineffective when a large Tutsi armed force based in neighboring Uganda invaded in July and seized full control of the entire nation of Rwanda. By the end of July 1994, nearly two million Hutus fled the country for safety, flooding into refugee camps in neighboring countries. As many thousands of refugees died of disease and starvation, Clinton ordered airdrops of food and supplies for the Hutu refugees, including known genocidaires. In July, he sent 200 non-combatant troops to the Rwanda capital of Kigali to manage the airport and distribute relief supplies. These troops were withdrawn by October 1994. Clinton and the United Nations faced criticism for their non-response to the genocide. When Clinton traveled to Africa in 1998, he said that the international community, presumably including the US, must accept responsibility for the failure to respond to the massacres. When speaking about the Rwanda Crisis, Clinton called it his worst failure, admitting "I blew it." During his African trip, Clinton also referred to the concept of the "new generation of African leaders".

=== Osama bin Laden attacks in Africa ===
In August 1998, terrorists bombed the United States embassies in the capitals of two East African countries, Nairobi, Kenya, and Dar es Salaam, Tanzania. About 250 people were killed, including 12 Americans, and more than 5,500 were injured. After intelligence linked the bombings to Osama bin Laden, a wealthy Saudi Arabian living in Afghanistan who was suspected of terrorist activity, Clinton ordered missile attacks on sites in Afghanistan and Sudan in retaliation for the bombings at the U.S. embassies and to deter future terrorist attacks. The Clinton administration maintained that the sites—a pharmaceutical factory at Khartoum (the capital of Sudan) and several alleged terrorist camps in Afghanistan—were involved in terrorist activities. The US aggressively pursued him after his 9-11 attacks.

== Europe ==
=== Balkans ===
Map of the six Yugoslav republics and autonomous provinces in 1991

Clinton wanted to avoid European operations as much as possible, and knew little about the complex situation in the Balkans. Nevertheless, it became more and more deeply involved, starting in early 1993.

==== Bosnia ====
Much of Clinton's reluctant focus was the war in Bosnia and Herzegovina, a nation in southeastern Europe that had declared its independence from Yugoslavia in 1992, as that conglomerate nation was collapsing in the wake of the fall of communism in Eastern Europe. The Bush administration decided with the Cold War over, Yugoslavia was no longer a high American priority. Trouble there could be left to Europe to handle. But Clinton was outraged by the humanitarian disaster, and decided to play a role. This declaration was the catalyst of a war between Bosnian Serbs, who wanted Bosnia to remain in the Yugoslav federation, and Bosnian Muslims and Croats. The Bosnian Serbs, who were supported by Serbia, were better equipped than the Muslims and the Croats; as a result, they populated and controlled much of the countryside in ways including besieging cities, such as the capital of Sarajevo. This caused widespread suffering.

In early 1993 the Clinton administration decided on aggressive action, ignoring both the United Nations and key European allies. The proposed policy was called lift and strike. The plan was to "lift" the arms embargo the UN had imposed on all sides, which left the Bosnian Muslims unarmed. The US would arm them so they could defend themselves. Until they were fully prepared to fight for themselves, the US would hit the Bosnian Serbs with air strikes to keep them back. Christopher traveled to Europe to win support from Britain, France and Germany, but they were all staunchly opposed. By the time Christopher returned to Washington, support for the plan had evaporated, based on memories of Vietnam and fears of being plunged into a chaotic war with no end in sight. In 1994, Clinton opposed an effort by the Republicans in Congress to lift the arms embargo, as it were, because American allies were still resistant to that policy.

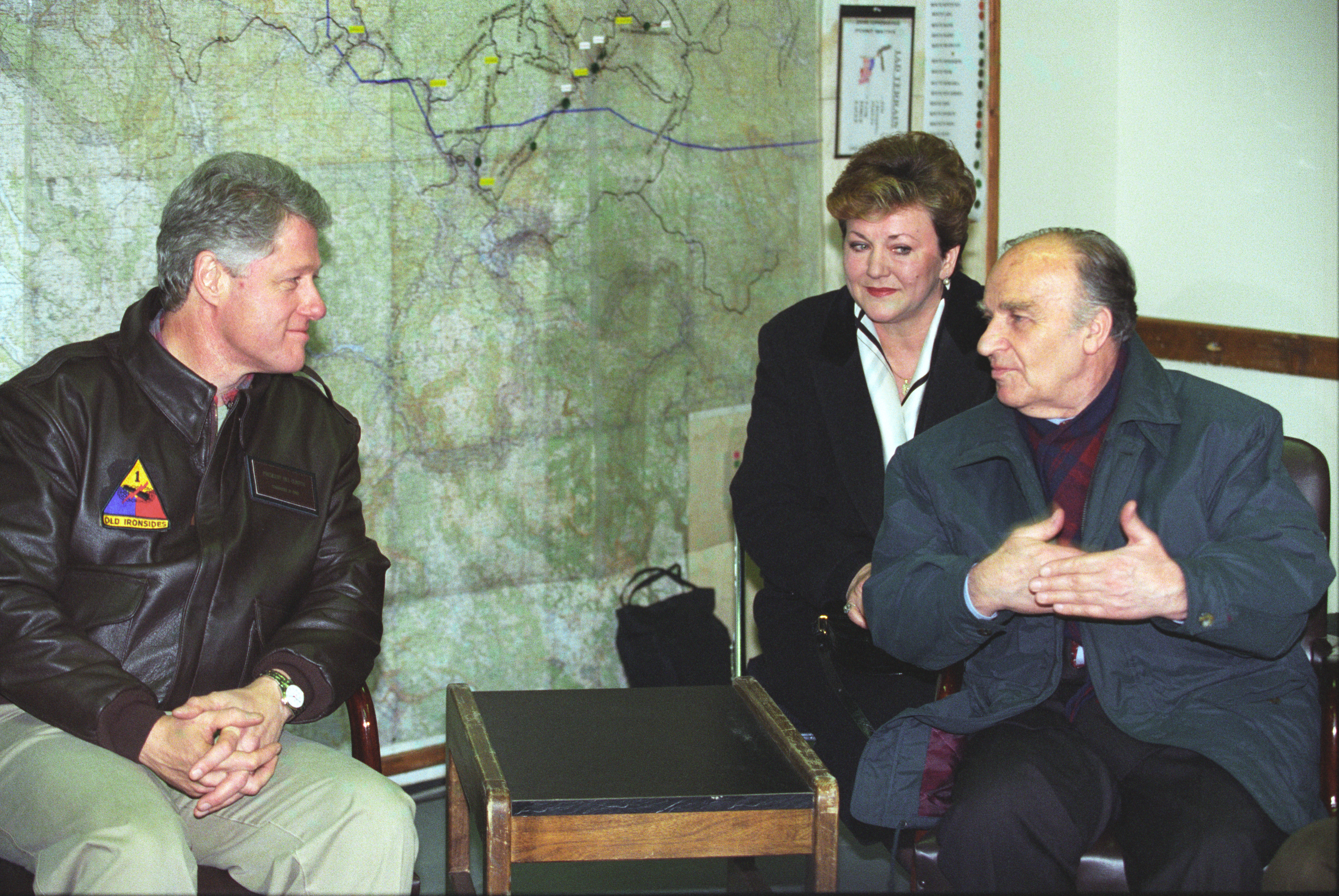
President Clinton meeting with Bosnian president Alija Izetbegović in Tuzla, 1997

Clinton continued to pressure western European countries throughout 1994 to take strong measures against the Serbs. But in November, as the Serbs seemed on the verge of defeating the Muslims and Croats in several strongholds, Clinton changed course and called for conciliation with the Serbs. After the 2nd Markale massacre, NATO, led by the United States, launched Operation Deliberate Force with a series of airstrikes against Bosnian Serb targets. In July 1995, as the tide of war was turning against the Bosnian Serbs, local Bosnian Serb forces under the command of General Ratko Mladić forced the surrender of the Bosnian stronghold of Srebrenica, near the eastern border with Serbia. A small UN force was helpless and the defenders surrendered, with the promise that no civilians or soldiers would be harmed if they surrendered. Instead, Mladić's forces massacred over 7000 Bosnians. It was the worst massacre in Europe In 40 years, and galvanized NATO Intervention. The escalating air campaign, along with a counter-offensive by better-equipped Muslim and Croatian forces, succeeded in pressuring the Bosnian Serbs into participating in negotiations. In November 1995, the U.S. hosted peace talks between the warring parties in Dayton, Ohio. Clinton assigned Richard Holbrooke the task of brokering an agreement alongside former Swedish prime minister Carl Bildt. The goal of the complex negotiations was an agreement to permanently end the three-way civil war and establish an internationally recognized, unified, democratic, multiethnic Bosnia. The parties reached a peace agreement known as the Dayton Agreement, making Bosnia as a single state made up of two separate entities together with a central government. Debate continues into the 21st century on how successful the project was. In 2011, Serbia was forced to turn over Mladić to the United Nations, and in 2017 he was sentenced to life imprisonment after being convicted of genocide.

Derek Chollet and Samantha Power argue that:

Dayton was a turning point for the Clinton Administration's foreign policy specifically and America's role in the world generally....In less than six months during 1995, the U.S. had taken charge of the Transatlantic Alliance, pushed NATO to use overwhelming military force, risked American prestige on a bold diplomatic gamble, and deployed thousands of American troops to help implement the agreement. That the administration ran such risks successfully gave it confidence going forward. This success also reinforced the logic of the administration's core strategic objective in Europe – to help create a continent "whole and free" by revitalizing and enlarging institutions like NATO. In the wake of Dayton, Clinton seem to be more confident foreign-policy president.

==== Enhanced roles of NATO and the United States ====
According to historian David N. Gibbs:

In bolstering America's hegemonic position, the significance of the Srebrenica massacre cannot be overstated: The massacre helped trigger a NATO bombing campaign that is widely credited with ending the Bosnian war, along with the associated atrocities, and this campaign gave NATO a new purpose for the post-Soviet era. Since that time, the Srebrenica precedent has been continuously invoked as a justification for military force. The perceived need to prevent massacres and oppression helped justify later interventions in Kosovo, Afghanistan, Iraq, and Libya, as well as the ongoing fight against ISIS. The recent UN doctrine of Responsibility to Protect, which contains a strongly interventionist tone, was inspired in part by the memory of Srebrenica.

==== Kosovo ====
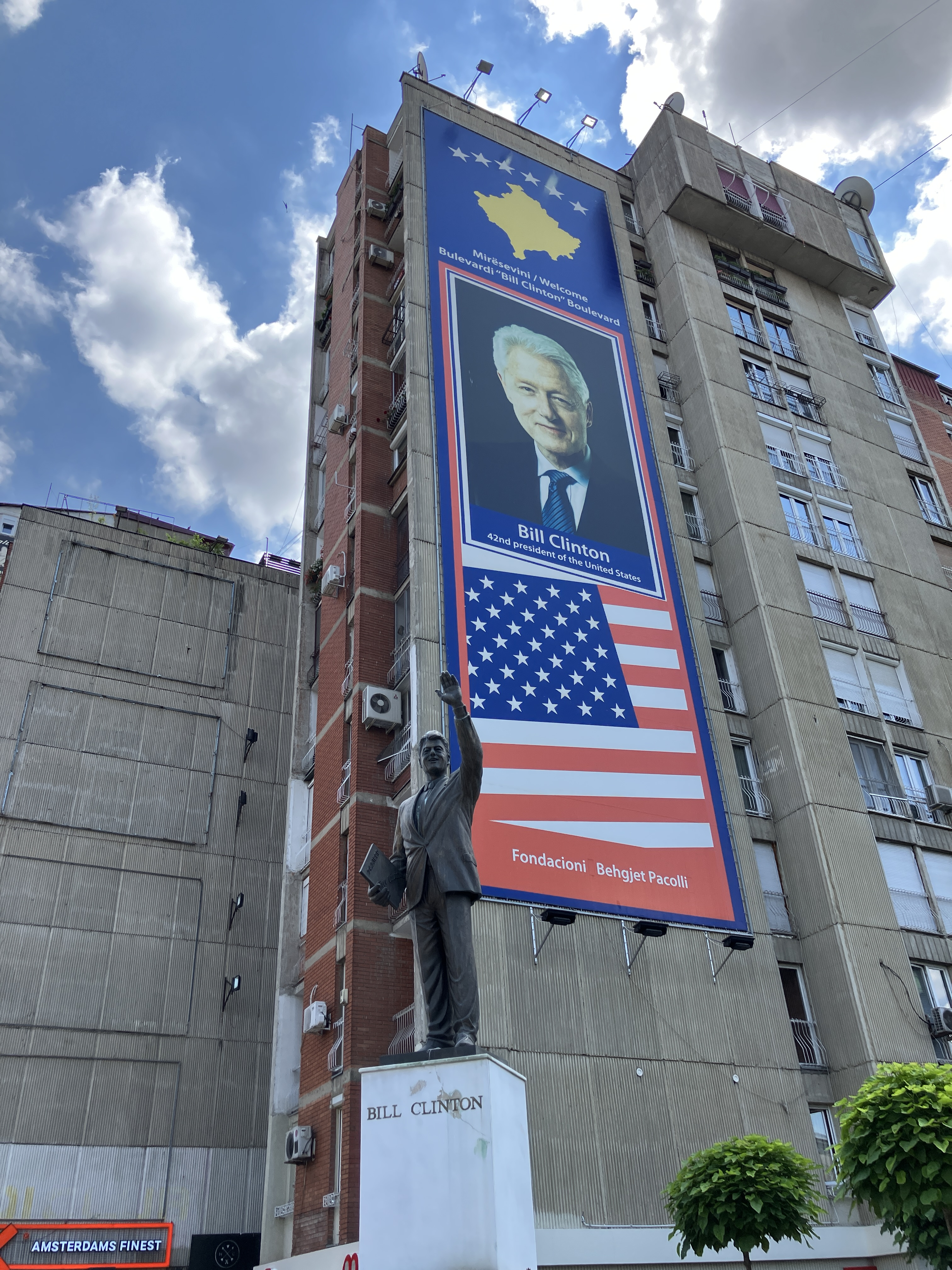
Statue of Bill Clinton located on Bill Clinton Boulevard in Pristina, Kosovo, June 2023

In the spring of 1998, ethnic tension in the Federal Republic of Yugoslavia–the state formed from the former Yugoslav republics of Serbia and Montenegro–heightened when the military forces responded in the Autonomous Province of Kosovo and Metohija. More than 90 percent of the residents of Kosovo were Muslim and ethnic Albanians, many of whom wanted independence from the country and unification with Albania. Yugoslav forces were mobilized into province to quell Albanian rebels.

Through attempting to impose the Rambouillet Agreement, Clinton, who strongly supported the Albanians, threatened the Yugoslav administration with military strikes. On March 24, 1999, NATO, led by the United States, launched the two-month bombardment of Yugoslavia. The strikes were not limited to military installations and NATO targets included civilian targets such as factories, oil refineries, television stations and various infrastructure. The intervention, which devastated Yugoslavia, was not approved by the UN General Assembly or the UN Security Council, and was strongly opposed by both Russia and China. It was the first time in NATO's history that its forces had attacked a sovereign country, and the first time in which air power alone won a battle. In June 1999, NATO and Yugoslav military leaders approved an international peace plan for Kosovo, and attacks were suspended after Yugoslav forces withdrew from Kosovo.

=== Northern Ireland ===
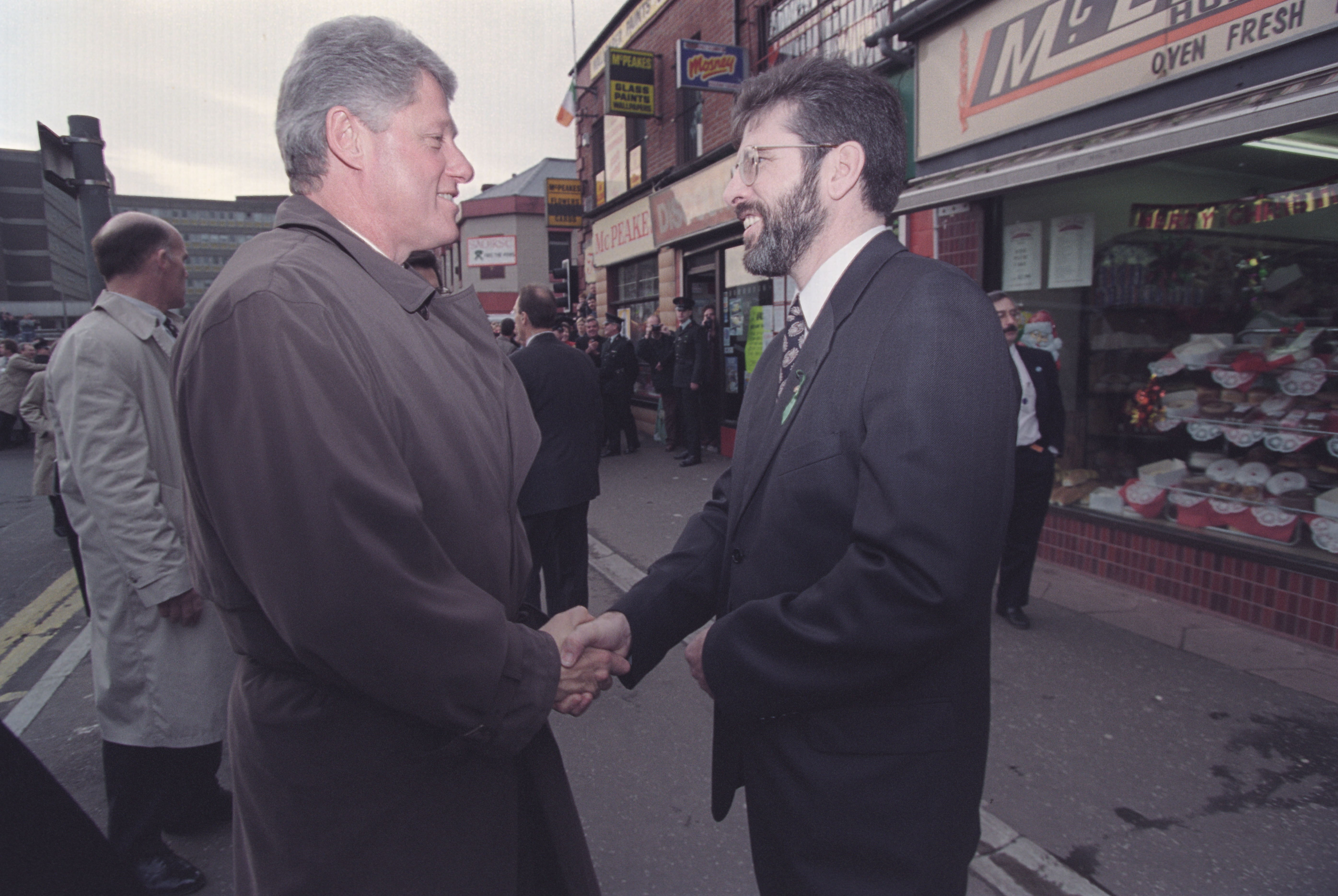
Clinton shaking hands with Gerry Adams outside a business in West Belfast, November 30, 1995

Clinton successfully worked to end the conflict in Northern Ireland by arranging a peace agreement between the nationalist and unionist factions, with the approval of London. In 1998 former senator George Mitchell—whom Clinton had appointed to assist in peace talks—brokered an accord known as the Good Friday Agreement. It called for the British Parliament to devolve legislative and executive authority of the province to a new Northern Ireland Assembly, whose Executive would include members of both communities. Years of stalemate have followed the agreement, mainly due to the refusal of the Provisional Irish Republican Army (IRA), a nationalist paramilitary group, to decommission its weapons for some years and after that the refusal of the Democratic Unionist Party to push the process forward. Mitchell returned to the region and arranged yet another blueprint for a further peace settlement that resulted in a December 1999 formation of the power-sharing government agreed the previous year, which was to be followed by steps toward the IRA's disarmament. That agreement eventually faltered as well, although Clinton continued peace talks to prevent the peace process from collapsing completely. In 2005 the IRA decommissioned all of its arms and, in 2007, Sinn Féin expressed a willingness to support the reformed Police Service of Northern Ireland (PSNI). Power was restored to the Assembly in May 2007, marking renewed promise for the fulfillment of the Good Friday Agreement.

=== Russia ===
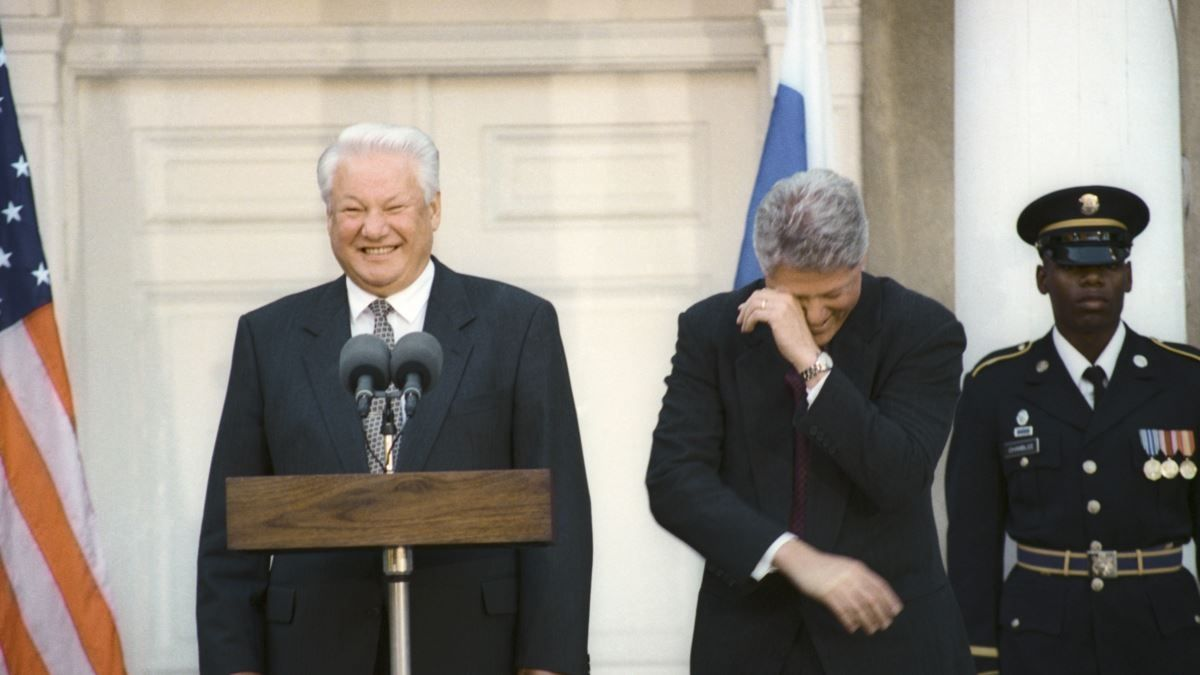
Clinton and Russian president Boris Yeltsin in the White House, October 1995

The Clinton policy was to support the Yeltsin government in Russia, which had abolished communism but faced severe economic stresses and weak domestic support. Yeltsin opposed NATO expansion but could not stop it. Clinton himself took primary responsibility for Russian policy. Yeltsin finally resigned as president at the end of 1999, replaced by his prime minister Vladimir Putin. Strobe Talbott, a close friend who became chief expert on Russia, has argued that Clinton hit it off with Russian Boris Yeltsin, the president of Russia 1991-1999:

The personal diplomacy between Clinton and Yeltsin, augmented by the channel that Gore developed with Yeltsin's longest-serving prime minister, Victor Chernomyrdin, yielded half a dozen major understandings that either resolved or alleviated disputes over Russia's role in the post–cold war world. The two presidents were the negotiators in chief of agreements to halt the sale of Russian rocket parts to India; remove Soviet-era nuclear missiles from Ukraine in exchange for Russian assurances of Ukraine's sovereignty and security; withdraw Russian troops from the Baltic states; institutionalize cooperation between Russia and an expanding NATO; lay the ground for the Baltic states to join the alliance; and ensure the participation of the Russian military in Balkan peacekeeping and of Russian diplomacy in the settlement of NATO's air war against Serbia.

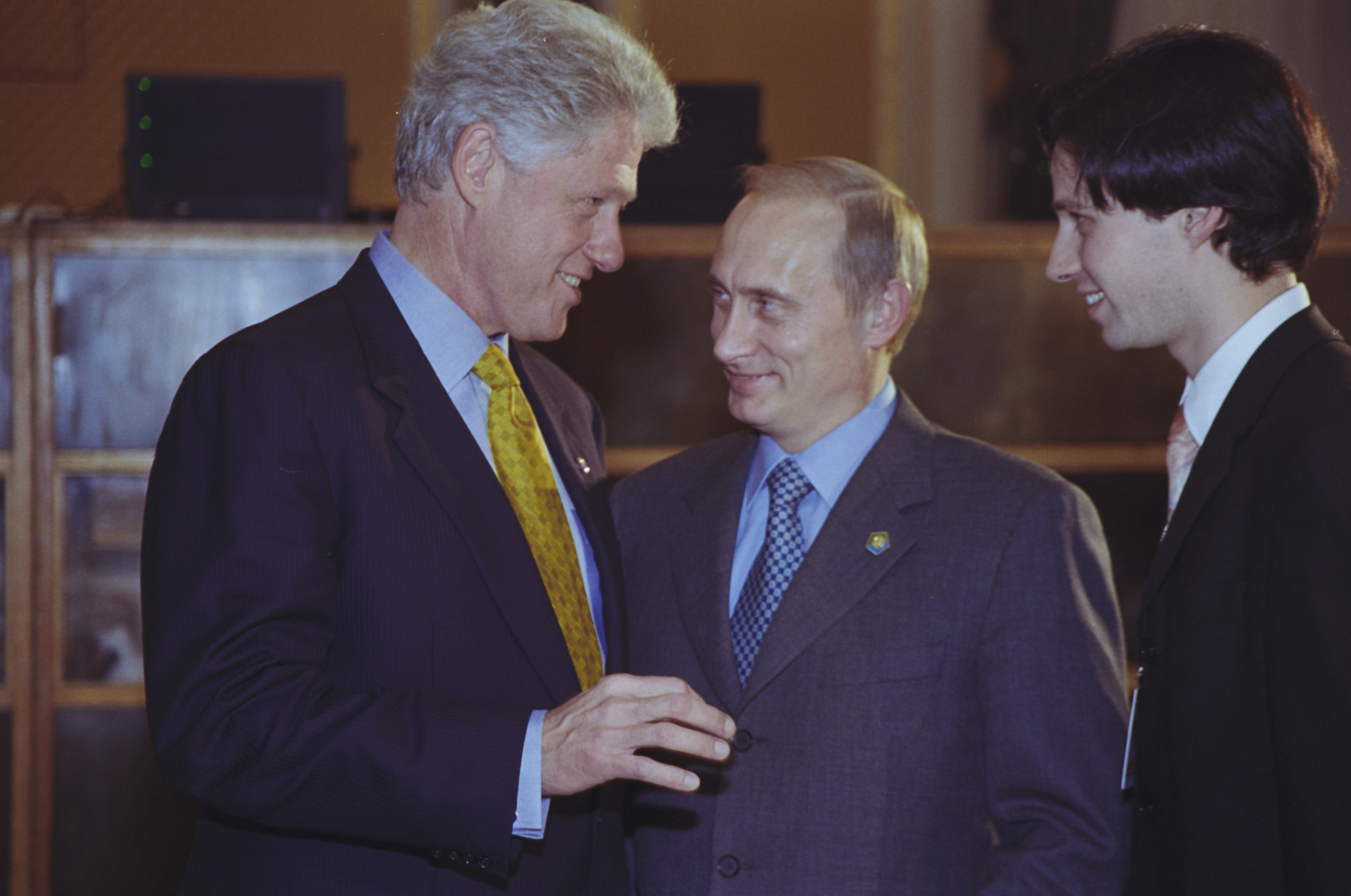
Clinton and Russian President Vladimir Putin at the Waldorf Astoria, New York, September 7, 2000

After Yeltsin took the lead in overthrowing Communism in 1991 relations remained generally warm. However, by Clinton's second term, relations started to fray. Moscow grew angry about Washington's intentions in the light of the first phase of the NATO eastward expansion toward the Russian border.

On September 20, 1993, during the War in Abkhazia, Clinton sent letters to Boris Yeltsin and Georgian leader Eduard Shevardnadze, noting his support for the Georgia's territorial integrity and sovereignty and condemned the military offensive by Abkhaz separatists.

In March 1999, Russia stridently opposed the U.S.-led NATO military operation against Serbia—a historic ally of Russia that was mistreating Kosovo. In December 1999, while on a visit to China, President Yeltsin verbally assailed Clinton for criticizing Russia's tactics in suppressing rebellion in its Chechnya province (at the start of the Second Chechen War) emphatically reminding that Russia remained a nuclear superpower and adding: "Things will be as we have agreed with Jiang Zemin. We will be saying how to live, not [Bill Clinton] alone".

== Middle East ==
For further information on the overarching strategy of President Clinton's approach to the Middle East, particularly Iraq and Iran, see dual containment.

=== Israeli–Palestinian conflict ===
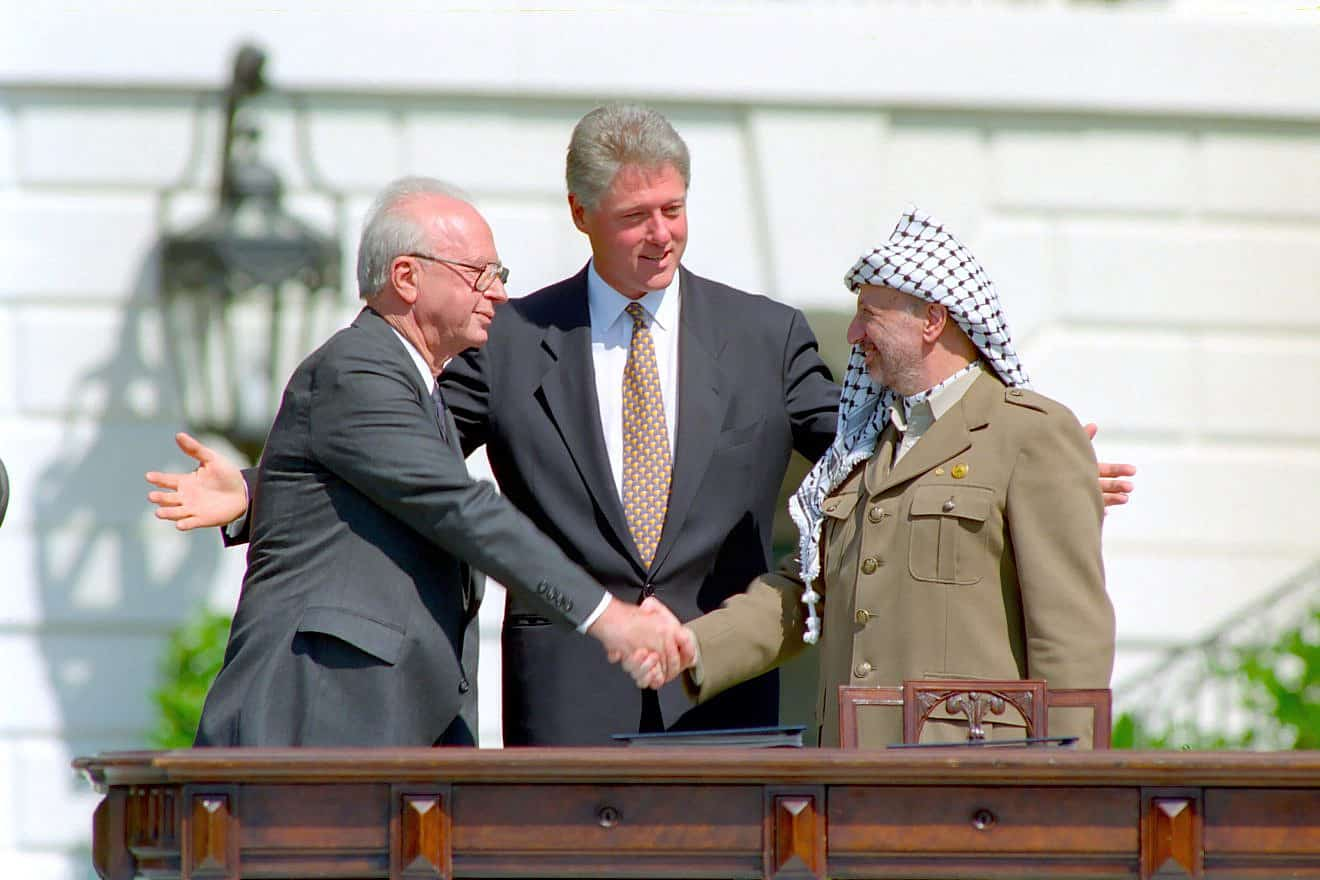
Yitzhak Rabin and Yasser Arafat shake hands at the signing of the Oslo Accords on September 13, 1993.

Clinton was deeply involved in the Middle East peace process to negotiate peace agreements between Israel and Palestine, as well as with the governments of Egypt, Jordan, Syria and Lebanon. Secret negotiations mediated by Clinton between Israeli prime minister Yitzhak Rabin and Palestine Liberation Organization (PLO) Chairman Yasser Arafat led to a historic declaration of peace in September 1993, called the Oslo Accords. Clinton personally arranged for the peace accord to be signed at the White House on September 13, 1993. The agreement allowed a limited Palestinian self-rule in the Israeli-occupied West Bank and Gaza Strip. Following up after Oslo, Secretary of State Christopher encouraged Jordan's King Hussein to make a peace treaty with Israel. Christopher offered Hussein $200 million in military equipment and $700 million in debt forgiveness to sweeten the deal. On October 27, 1994, Rabin and Jordanian prime minister Abdelsalam al-Majali signed the Israel–Jordan peace treaty. It was the second peace treaty for Israel after Egypt. Christopher sought to obtain a third treaty between Rabin and Syrian president Hafez al-Assad, but to no avail.

The 1993 and 1995 peace agreements between Israel and Palestine, however, did not end the conflict in the Middle East. As the peace process came to a stall, Clinton invited Israeli prime minister Benjamin Netanyahu and Palestinian leader Yasser Arafat to peace talks on the Wye River in October 1998. The two leaders signed yet another agreement, known as the Wye River Memorandum, which called for Israel to transfer more territory in the West Bank to the Palestinians. In return, the Palestinians agreed to take steps to curb terrorism. They also agreed to a timetable to negotiate a final resolution of the Palestinian fight for an independent state.

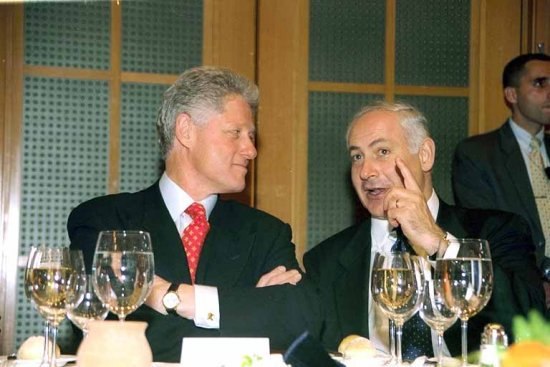
Clinton with Israeli Prime Minister Benjamin Netanyahu on December 13, 1998

After an abrupt outbreak of violence sparked by the agreement, however, Netanyahu refused to cede any more West Bank territory and placed new demands upon Palestine. His ceding of territory had shaken his own coalition, though, and together with other factors, this contributed to the downfall of the Netanyahu government in Israel. As a result, in May 1999 Israelis elected Ehud Barak, the leader of a political coalition that favored resuming the peace process, to replace Netanyahu as prime minister. Clinton continued to work passionately on negotiations between Israel and the Palestinians. Throughout his last year in office, Clinton came close to arranging a final peace settlement but failed, according to Clinton, as a result of Arafat's reluctance. Clinton related a phone conversation he had with Arafat three days before he left office. "You are a great man," Arafat said. Clinton replied, "The hell I am. I'm a colossal failure, and you made me one."

However, relations soured after Israel opposed the Kosovo War and the NATO bombing of Yugoslavia.

=== Iraq ===
Clinton was confronted with deep problems in Iraq. In 1991, United States under President George H. W. Bush participated in the Persian Gulf War to liberate Kuwait from the Iraqi occupation. In 1991, the warring parties signed a cease-fire agreement and the United Nations Security Council passed United Nations Security Council Resolution 687 requiring Iraq to eliminate its weapons of mass destruction and allow inspectors from the United Nations Special Commission (UNS-COM) to monitor the country's adherence to the agreement. In addition to UN inspections, to ensure the Iraqi compliance of Resolution 688 which called for Iraq to end its oppression of Iraqi citizens, the no-fly zones over Iraq were established by the U.S. and its allies to protect the Kurds in Iraqi Kurdistan and the Shiites in southern Iraq from aerial attacks by the Iraqi government.

On June 26, 1993, Clinton ordered a cruise missile attack on the Iraqi Intelligence Service's (IIS) principal command and control complex in Baghdad, publicly announced as retaliation for the assassination attempt by the IIS on former president George H. W. Bush while he was visiting Kuwait in April of that year to commemorate a coalition victory over Iraq in the Gulf War. Fourteen cruise missiles were launched from USS Peterson and nine of them launched from USS Chancellorsville. Sixteen hit the target, while three struck a residential area, killing nine civilians and wounding 12 others. Four missiles were unaccounted for. This strike was in violation of international law, although that point is contentious.

In October 1994, Baghdad once again began mobilizing around 64,000 Iraqi troops near the Kuwaiti border because of their expressed frustrations of economic sanctions imposed on Iraq by the United Nations Security Council (UNSC). In response, the U.S. begins to deploy troops in the Persian Gulf to deter Iraqi aggression against Kuwait. Code-named Operation Vigilant Warrior, 1st Brigade of the Fort Stewart, Georgia-based 24th Infantry Division (Mechanized) deployed and drew pre-positioned equipment in Kuwait. The 23rd Wing's (Flying Tigers) 75th Fighter Squadron (Tigersharks) and its full complement of A-10s initially deployed from Pope AFB, North Carolina to Dhahran Air Base, Saudi Arabia, followed by the first forward deployment to Ahmad al-Jaber Air Base, Kuwait. This allowed better face-to-face coordination with tactical air control parties (TACP) assets further forward deployed at Camp Doha, Kuwait and points north. Iraq would later withdraw troops near the Kuwaiti border in response to a massive U.S. military buildup. This served to increase U.S. and Coalition resolve to contain Iraqi aggression against their neighbors in the Middle East.

In September 1996, Clinton ordered Operation Desert Strike, and ships from the USS Carl Vinson Battle Group, including USS Laboon, and USS Shiloh, in conjunction with B-52 bombers escorted by F-14D Tomcats from USS Carl Vinson, launched 27 cruise missiles against Iraqi air defense targets in southern Iraq. A second wave of 17 was launched later that day. The missiles hit targets in and around Kut, Iskandariyah, Nasiriyah, and Tallil. This was done in response to Saddam Hussein, an Iraqi dictator, attempting to launch an Iraqi military offensive campaign in the Kurdish town of Arbil in Iraqi Kurdistan.

In his 1998 State of the Union Address, Clinton warned the U.S. Congress of Hussein's possible pursuit of nuclear weapons, saying:

Together we must also confront the new hazards of chemical and biological weapons, and the outlaw states, terrorists and organized criminals seeking to acquire them. Saddam Hussein has spent the better part of this decade, and much of his nation's wealth, not on providing for the Iraqi people, but on developing nuclear, chemical and biological weapons and the missiles to deliver them. The United Nations weapons inspectors have done a truly remarkable job, finding and destroying more of Iraq's arsenal than was destroyed during the entire gulf war. Now, Saddam Hussein wants to stop them from completing their mission. I know I speak for everyone in this chamber, Republicans and Democrats, when I say to Saddam Hussein, "You cannot defy the will of the world", and when I say to him, "You have used weapons of mass destruction before; we are determined to deny you the capacity to use them again."

The UNS-COM team faced resistance from Iraq, which blocked inspections and hid deadly germ agents and warheads. Clinton then threatened military action several times when Hussein, who turned out to be Iraq's president, tried stalling the UNS-COM inspections.

To weaken Hussein's grip of power, Clinton signed the Iraq Liberation Act into law on October 31, 1998, which instituted a policy of "regime change" against Iraq, though it explicitly stated it did not speak to the use of American military forces.

Between December 16 and 19, 1998, Clinton ordered four-day period of concentrated air attacks against military installations in Iraq. This was in response to Saddam's refusal to cooperate with UN inspectors. After the bombing, Hussein blocked any further UN inspections and announced its attempt to shoot down Coalition aircraft in the no-fly zones over Iraq. For several years afterward, U.S. and Coalition aircraft routinely attacked hostile Iraqi defense installations in Iraq, in response to what the Clinton administration claimed were "provocations" by the Iraqi military, including antiaircraft fire and radar locks on U.S. and Coalition aircraft.

The UN sanctions against Iraq that the United Nations Security Council imposed after the Gulf War remained in place during the Clinton administration. These sanctions were alleged to have contributed to increased child mortality there, although this was disputed. Albright later wrote "Saddam Hussein could have prevented any child from suffering simply by meeting his obligations. Recent research has shown that commonly cited data were fabricated by the Iraqi government and that "there was no major rise in child mortality in Iraq after 1990 and during the period of the sanctions."

=== Iran ===
In 1993, the Clinton Administration announced that containing the "hostile" and "dangerous" government of Iran would be a basic element of its Middle East policy. Clinton continued the same policy of his predecessor, George H. W. Bush, who had concluded that Iran's support for terrorism and pursuit of nuclear technology warranted a strong response. Henry Rome argues that Israel did not shape that decision. Clinton sought to contain Iranian ambitions as part of the dual containment strategy. On May 6, 1995, Clinton signed Executive Order 12957, which implemented tight oil and trade sanctions on Iran and made it illegal for American corporations or their foreign subsidiaries to participate in any contract "for the financing of the development of petroleum resources located in Iran." On May 6, 1995, Clinton issued Executive Order 12959, which banned almost all trade between U.S. businesses and the Iranian government with the exception of informational materials. A year before, the president declared that Iran was a "state sponsor of terrorism" and a "rogue state," marking the first time that an American president used that term.

In 1996, Clinton signed the Iran and Libya Sanctions Act, that imposed economic sanctions on firms doing business with Iran and Libya.

In 1996, the Clinton administration agreed to compensate the Iranian government for the deaths of 254 Iranians in a 1988 incident in which an Iranian commercial passenger plane was shot down by mistake by an American warship the USS Vincennes. In Clinton's second term as president, beginning in 1997, the administration began to take a softer approach towards Iran, particularly after the election of reformist Mohammad Khatami as President of Iran.

Clinton at one point offered to open up an official dialogue with the Iranian government and renew diplomatic relations with the country after 20 years of no such relations. However, Ayatollah Ali Khamenei refused to accept the offer for dialogue unless the U.S. formally withdrew its support for Israel, lifted the '95 sanctions imposed on the country, stopped accusing Tehran of attempting to develop nuclear weaponry, and officially ended its policy of considering Iran a "rogue state that sponsors terrorism." Although Clinton did privately weigh the idea of revoking the executive orders he signed in the spring of 1995, the administration refused to comply with Iran's other demands.

Eventually, President Clinton did ease restrictions on export of food and medical equipment to Iran. In 2000 Albright mentioned the CIA role in the 1953 military coup that overthrew Prime Minister, Mohammed Mossadegh, and replaced him with the Shah. Albright also acknowledged that the U.S.-backed government of the Shah "brutally repressed political dissent." Albright announced in 2000 that the U.S. would begin to "enable Americans to purchase and import carpets and food products such as dried fruits, nuts, and caviar from Iran" and also was confident that Iran would provide cooperation with the United States in the battle against narcotics and international drug abuse. In 1995, the State Department had warned U.S. citizens against traveling in Iran due to that government's rampant anti-Americanism, In 2000 Albright decided to repeal this warning.

== East Asia and South Asia ==
=== Vietnam ===
In 1994, the Clinton administration announced that it was lifting the trade embargo on Vietnam, citing progress on the Vietnam War POW/MIA issue regarding the search for American soldiers listed as missing in action and the remains of those killed in action, as well as the market reforms that Vietnam implemented from 1986. On July 10, 1995, Clinton announced that his administration was restoring full diplomatic relations with Vietnam, citing the continued progress in determining the whereabouts of MIA's and locating the remains of soldiers killed in the Vietnam War. Clinton nonetheless stressed that the search for Americans would continue, especially for the soldiers listed as "discrepancies;" namely 55 American soldiers believed to still be alive when they went missing. On November 16, 2000, Clinton arrived in Hanoi with his wife, Senator-elect Hillary Clinton shortly before his second term in office ended. The next day Clinton spoke to the Vietnamese people publicly about both the conflict as well as the promise renewed relations meant.

=== China and Taiwan ===
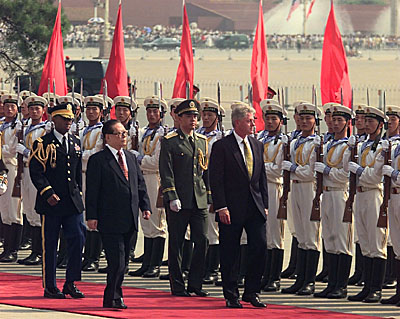
Clinton and Chinese President Jiang Zemin review the troops during the arrival ceremony at the Great Hall of the People, Beijing, China, on June 27, 1998

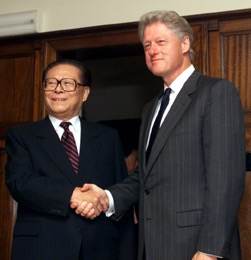
Clinton with Chinese President Jiang Zemin on September 11, 1999

Running for president in 1992, Bill Clinton criticized George H. W. Bush for prioritizing trade relationships over human rights issues in China. Clinton's May 28, 1993, Executive Order 128950 linked future extension of China's most favored nation trading status to China's progress on U.S.-defined human rights measures. China made virtually no effort to comply with the U.S. conditions and in mid-1994 Clinton changed his position, de-linking the China's most favored nation status from human rights issues.

Congressional pressure, especially from the Republican Party, prompted Clinton to approve arms sales to Taiwan, despite the strong displeasure voiced by Beijing.

In July 1993, the Yinhe incident occurred, in which the US Navy stopped a Chinese container ship en route to Kuwait in international waters, cut off its GPS so that it lost direction and was forced to anchor, and held it in place for twenty-four days. The United States incorrectly alleged that the Yinhe was carrying precursors of chemical weapons for Iran. It eventually forced an inspection of the ship in Saudi Arabia, but found no chemical precursors. The United States refused China's request for a formal apology and refused to pay compensation. This incident was viewed in China as international bullying by the United States.

In 1995-96 the Third Taiwan Strait Crisis happened between Taiwan and China. Chinese concerns about the upcoming Taiwanese presidential election as well as the possibility of the declaration of Taiwanese independence led to a series of missile tests right off the coast of Taiwan that could have escalated out of control. The Clinton administration responded in March 1996 by staging the biggest display of American military might in Asia since the Vietnam War. Numerous aircraft carrier groups were stationed near Taiwan. USS Nimitz and her group as well as USS Belleau Wood sailed through the Taiwan Strait in a demonstration of support for Taiwan. Eventually a ceasefire was declared and China declared the 'missile tests' to be completed.

When Clinton traveled to Shanghai during his 1998 visit to China, he declared the "three nos" for United States foreign policy towards China: (1) not recognizing two Chinas, (2) not supporting Taiwanese independence, and (3) not supporting Taiwanese efforts to join international organizations for which sovereignty is a membership requirement.

=== North Korea ===
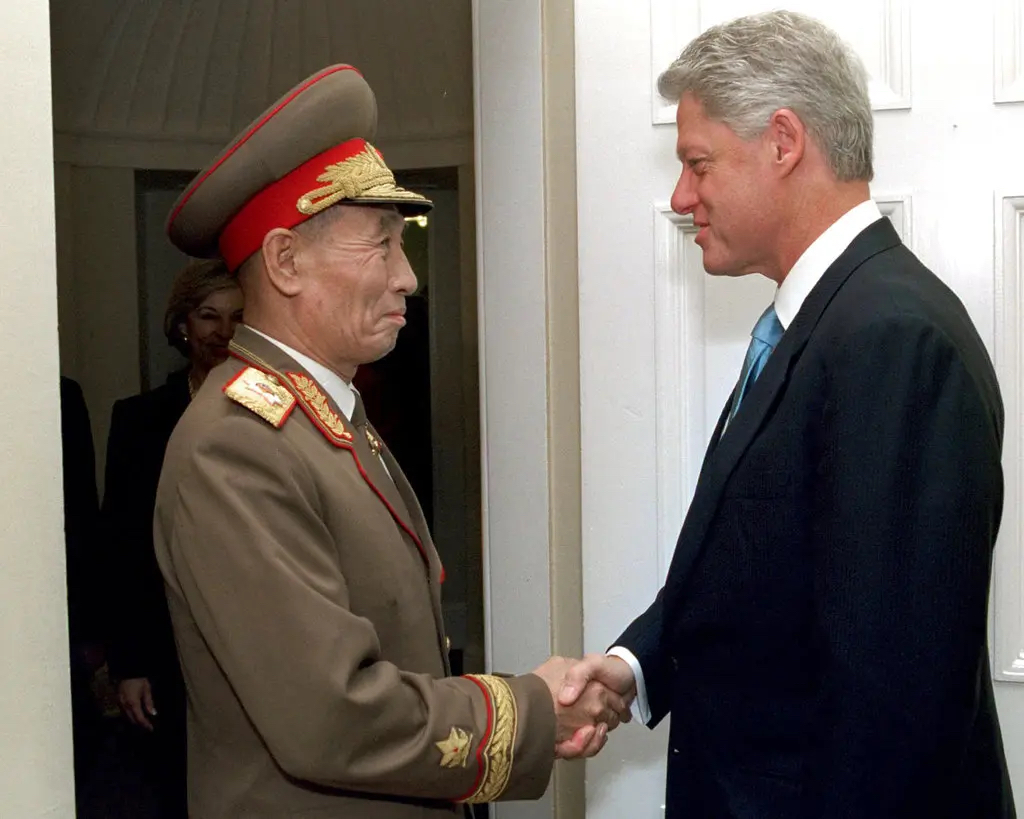
Vice Marshal Jo Myong-rok meets Bill Clinton at the White House, October 2000.

North Korea's goal was to create nuclear weapons and ballistic missiles, creating a serious problem for the Clinton Administration that remains an issue into the 2020s. In 1994, North Korea, a signatory of the Nuclear Nonproliferation Treaty, refused to allow international inspectors to review two nuclear waste sites. The inspectors wanted to see if North Korea was in violation of the treaty since they were suspected of reprocessing spent fuel into plutonium, which could be used to manufacture nuclear weapons. Despite diplomatic pressure and repeated warnings by Clinton, North Korea refused to allow the inspections and even raised the prospect of war with South Korea, an ally of the United States. In 1994, Clinton also considered a US military strike on the Yongbyon nuclear reactor. He was advised that if war broke out, it could cost 52,000 US and 490,000 South Korean military casualties in the first three months, as well as a large number of civilian casualties.

With private diplomacy by former president Jimmy Carter, the Clinton administration reached a breakthrough with North Korea in October 1994 when North Korea agreed to shut down the nuclear plants that could produce materials for weapons if the United States would help North Korea build plants that generated electricity with light-water nuclear reactors. These reactors would be more efficient and their waste could not easily be used for nuclear weaponry. The United States also agreed to supply fuel oil for electricity until the new plants were built, and North Korea agreed to allow inspection of the old waste sites when construction began on the new plants. KEDO was established based on this agreement in 1995.

This 1994 Agreed Framework, as it was known, kept the Yongbyon plutonium enrichment plant closed and under international inspection until 2002. However, economic supports by the agreement and KEDO gave an advantage to North Korea, and North Korea broke off from the treaty and restarted plutonium production. In October 2006, North Korea tested its first nuclear weapon. President Bush warned that he was not pleased by such actions as it is he invited the international community to take a stand. As a result, North Korea, the United States, Russia, China were involved in negotiations and North Korea agreed to close down their nuclear station temporarily.

=== Japan ===
Relations improved slowly with Japan, despite wide fears that the country was surpassing America economically. In terms of security issues and basic political solidarity, agreement was high. The friction came on trade issues, but even there, Washington and Tokyo stood together against the assertions of the fastest growing power: China. The nuclear threat posed by North Korea was a concern. Clinton's policy was multilateral pressure on Pyongyang while arming South Korea and Japan. There was a strong element in Japan against any rearmament, and North Korea proved intractable.

Trade issues focused on the large trade deficit, as Japan exported far more to the United States than it imported. Progress on resolving these trade issues was impeded by the rapid turnover in Japanese prime ministers—there were five in Clinton's first four years. The Clinton-Hosokawa summit in 1994 failed when Morihiro Hosokawa refused to accept unilateral US demands regarding imports of Japanese automobiles. However Clinton and the new prime minister, Ryutaro Hashimoto, held a pleasant meeting in Tokyo in the spring of 1996; Clinton agreed to return one of the controversial military bases on Okinawa.

=== India ===
Under Clinton and P. V. Narasimha Rao (Prime Minister 1991-1996) both sides mishandled relations, according to Arthur G. Rubinoff. Clinton simultaneously pressured India to liberalize its economy while criticizing New Delhi on human rights and nuclear issues. India's refusal to accept the Nuclear Non-Proliferation Treaty became a serious barrier. In the face of criticism from Washington and opposition at home, Indian leaders lost their enthusiasm for rapprochement and reverted to formalistic protocol over substantive diplomacy. The Brown Amendment that restored American aid to Pakistan in 1995 was an irritant. In returning to angry Cold War style rhetoric, Indian parliamentarians and American congressmen demonstrated their unwillingness to establish a new relationship.

== Canada ==
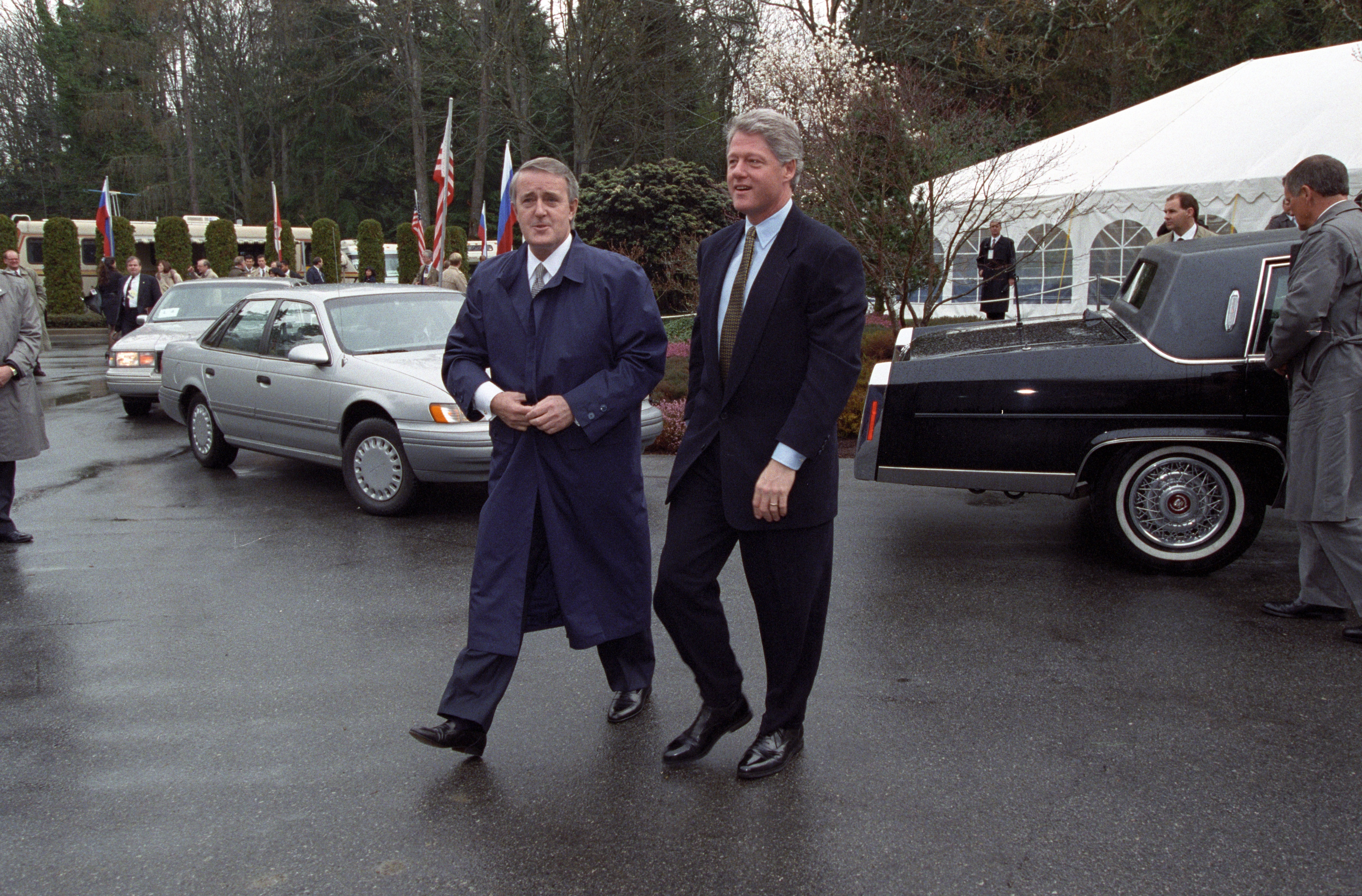
Clinton with Canadian Prime Minister Brian Mulroney in Vancouver, British Columbia, on April 3, 1993

Relations with Canada were friendly. The Clinton administration's policy toward Canada was primarily defined by economic integration and cooperation, with a strong emphasis on the North American Free Trade Agreement (NAFTA). The administration continued and expanded upon the close bilateral relationship between the United States and Canada, focusing on trade, economic growth, and regional stability.

=== NAFTA implementation and expansion ===
NAFTA was initially negotiated and signed by President George H. W. Bush in 1992. Clinton worked with Congress to secure its ratification and signed it into law in 1993. NAFTA created a free trade zone among the United States, Canada, and Mexico by eliminating most tariffs and trade restrictions, and included provisions for labor and environmental cooperation. Clinton added supplemental agreements to address labor unions and environmental concerns, making NAFTA the first "green" trade treaty and the first to address labor laws, though with limited enforcement mechanisms.

=== Trade and economic growth ===
The administration viewed free trade with Canada as essential for long-term economic prosperity in North America. Clinton argued that NAFTA would increase exports, create jobs, and promote economic growth in all three member countries. The agreement removed barriers in sectors such as agriculture, textiles, and automobiles, and established mechanisms for dispute resolution and intellectual property protection.

While NAFTA was credited with increasing trade and job creation, it also faced criticism from labor unions and environmental groups over job losses and regulatory standards.

=== Bilateral cooperation ===
Beyond trade, the Clinton administration maintained strong diplomatic and security ties with Canada, consistent with the longstanding partnership between the two countries. There were no major disputes or shifts in the broader relationship during Clinton's tenure, and the administration worked with Canada on issues such as border security and environmental protection. James J. Blanchard, the U.S. ambassador to Canada in 1993–1996, secretly opposed Quebec's separatist movement in the Quebec referendum campaign of October 1995. Blanchard engineered a last-minute statement supporting a united Canada by President Clinton. As a result, five days before the vote, Clinton, in response to a question asked by Canadian reporter Henry Champ, recognized the referendum as an internal issue of Canada. However, he then gave a minute-long statement extolling the virtues of a united Canada, ending with "Canada has been a great model for the rest of the world, and has been a great partner of the United States, and I hope that can continue." While the statement provided relief in sovereignist circles for not being a stronger endorsement of the "No" position, the implication of Clinton, who was popular in Quebec and the leader of the province's most important trading partner, endorsing Canadian unity had strong reverberations in the electorate.

== Latin America ==
In its first two years, says Robert Pastor, the Administration worked to restore democracy in Haiti and secured Senate approval of NAFTA, the North American Free Trade Agreement that Bush had negotiated. It did not offer any new or long-term objectives for the Americas. After 1994 the main issues involved the Mexican financial crisis, the questions of further sanctions on Cuba, and battles with the Republicans who controlled Congress.

=== Haiti ===
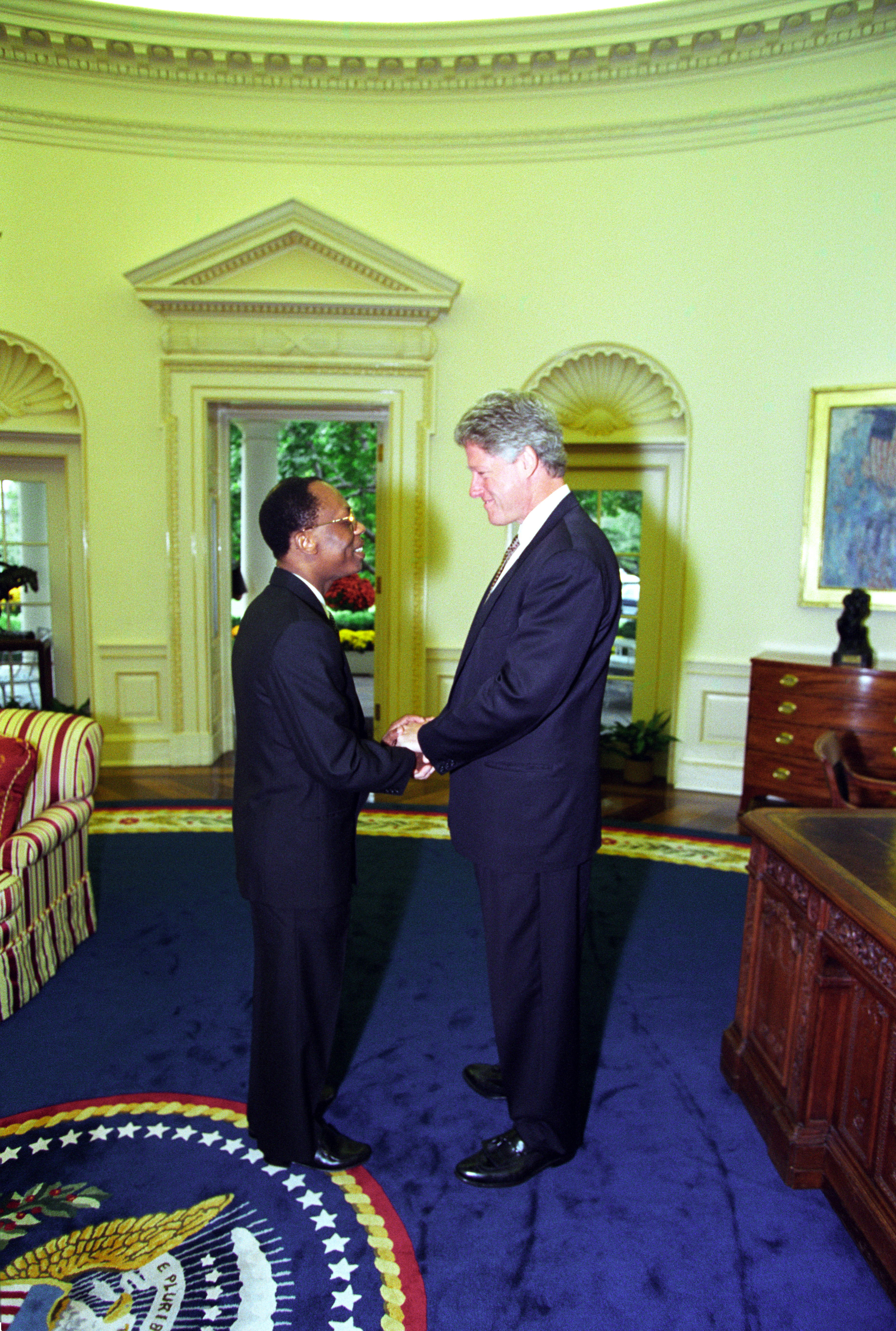
Clinton with Haitian President Jean-Bertrand Aristide in the Oval Office on October 14, 1994

Continued instability in Haiti led to difficult decisions about military intervention. The 1991 Haitian coup d'état, led by Lieutenant General Raoul Cédras, had ousted the country's elected president, Jean-Bertrand Aristide, who barely escaped to the United States. Shortly thereafter tens of thousands of Haitians also tried to flee to the United States in leaky boats; in 1993 increased opposition to Aristide supporters would increase these numbers. Relatively few refugees would be allowed legal entry, with most being sent back to Haiti or Guantanamo by the Coast Guard. Clinton had previously criticized President George H. W. Bush for doing much the same.

American opinion generally favored Aristide but opposed military intervention. Clinton was highly sensitive to his black constituency, and the black leadership in Congress pushed for action. Vice President Gore and advisor Anthony Lake strongly agreed, while Sandy Berger, Strobe Talbott, Warren Christopher and Defense Secretary William Perry went along. Clinton agreed, but worried about going against the democratic will in his own country to enforce democracy in some other country. Clinton tried to rally public opinion with a forceful televised address that denounced the military junta as armed thugs engaged in "a reign of terror, executing children, raping women, killing priests." Clinton demanded it leave immediately. As American warplanes were being readied for an invasion, suddenly former president Jimmy Carter proposed to negotiate a settlement. Clinton sent Carter, Colin Powell, and Senator Sam Nunn to Haiti to convince the junta to leave. In a matter of 48 hours, Carter's group achieved the desired transfer of power without any violence. In Operation Uphold Democracy American forces landed after the departure of the junta. Anthony Lake attributed the success to a combination of power and diplomacy. Without Clinton's threat of force, the junta would never have left. Without Carter, there would have been fighting. Aristide returned to power, and Clinton's prestige was enhanced. Nevertheless, six years later conditions were still terrible in Haiti.

=== Mexico ===
After securing the NAFTA treaty that integrated the Mexican and American economies, Clinton faced yet another foreign crisis in early 1995. The Mexican peso began to fall sharply and threatened the collapse of the Mexican economy. Clinton feared that a collapse would have a negative impact on the United States because of their close economic ties. He proposed a plan to address the financial crisis in Mexico, but many in Congress, fearing that constituents would not favor aid money to Mexico, rejected the plan. In response, Clinton used executive authority to create a $20 billion loan package for Mexico to restore international confidence in the Mexican economy. The loan went through and Mexico completed its loan payments to the United States in January 1997, three years ahead of schedule. However, issues such as drug smuggling and immigration continued to strain relations.

=== Cuba ===
American foreign policy toward Cuba had been hostile since Fidel Castro aligned the country with the Soviet Union in 1960. Clinton basically continue the policy especially regarding trade embargoes, but he faced a difficult problem on what to do with Cuban refugees trying to reach asylum in the United States.

After negotiations with representatives of the Cuban government, Clinton revealed in May 1995 a controversial policy reversing the decades-old policy of automatically granting asylum to Cuban refugees. Approximately 20,000 Cuban refugees detained at Guantanamo Bay Naval Base in Cuba were to be admitted to the United States over a period of three months. In order to prevent a mass exodus of refugees to the United States, all future refugees would be returned to Cuba. The influx of refugees into Guantanamo Bay overwhelmed the facilities, necessitating Operations Safe Haven and Safe Passage involving Panama. Clinton also implemented the wet foot/dry foot policy for Cuban refugees. This policy meant that Cuban refugees caught at sea were returned to Cuba (wet foot), while Cuban refugees that made it to dry land (dry foot) were allowed to stay in the U.S. This changed the refugees' tactics from slow rafts to speed boats.

Relations between the United States and Cuba deteriorated in February 1996 when Cuba shot down two American civilian planes. Cuba accused the planes of violating Cuban airspace. Clinton tightened sanctions against Cuba and suspended charter flights from the United States to Cuba, hoping this would cripple Cuba's tourism industry.

In their response to the incident, the U.S. Congress passed the Helms–Burton Act in March 1996. The bill strengthened an embargo against imports of Cuban products. Title III, however, made the bill controversial because it allowed American citizens whose property was seized during and after the 1959 Cuban Revolution to sue in American courts foreign companies that later invested in those properties. Title III sparked an immediate uproar from countries such as Mexico, Canada, and members of the European Union because they believed that they would be penalized for doing business with Cuba. In response, Clinton repeatedly suspended Title III of the legislation (the act gave the president the right to exercise this option every six months).

Clinton softened his Cuban policy in 1998 and 1999. In March 1998, at the urging of Pope John Paul II, Clinton lifted restrictions and allowed humanitarian charter flights to resume. He also took steps to increase educational, religious, and humanitarian contacts in Cuba. The U.S. government decided to allow Cuban citizens to receive more money from American friends and family members and to buy more American food and medicine.

== Counterterrorism and Osama bin Laden ==
On February 26, 1993, thirty-six days after Clinton took office, terrorists who the CIA would later reveal were working under the direction of Osama bin Laden detonated a timed car bomb in the parking garage below Tower One of the World Trade Center in New York City (see the World Trade Center bombing). Clinton responded by ordering his National Security Council, under the direction of Anthony Lake, and the FBI to find and punish those responsible. The FBI was able to quickly identify the vehicle used in the bomb from a remnant found in the rubble: a Ryder rental van, which had been reported stolen in Jersey City, New Jersey the day before. The truck was rented by Mohammed Salameh, whom the FBI immediately detained. Similar evidence led to the arrests of other plotters behind the attack, including Nidal Ayyad, Mahmoud Abouhalima, Ahmad Ajaj, and Ramzi Yousef—who was identified as the key player in the bombing. All men were tried and convicted for the bombing and other terrorists activities.

In his 1995 State of the Union address, Clinton proposed "comprehensive legislation to strengthen our hand in combating terrorists, whether they strike at home or abroad." He sent legislation to Congress to extend federal criminal jurisdiction, make it easier to deport terrorists, and act against terrorist fund-raising. Following the bombing of the Alfred P. Murrah Federal Building in Oklahoma City, Clinton amended that legislation to increase wiretap and electronic surveillance authority for the FBI, require explosives to be equipped with traceable taggants, and appropriate more funds to the FBI, CIA, and local police.

In June 1995, Clinton issued Presidential Decision Directive 39, which stated that the United States "should deter, defeat and respond vigorously to all terrorist attacks on our territory and against our citizens." Furthermore, it called terrorism both a "matter of national security" and a crime. The implementation of his proposals led to a substantial increase in counter-terrorism funds for the FBI and CIA.

In 1996, the CIA established a special unit of officers to analyze intelligence received about bin Laden and plan operations against him, coined the "Bin Laden Issue Station". It was this unit that first realized bin Laden was more than just a terrorist financier, but a leader of a global network with operations based in Afghanistan. Given these findings, the NSC encouraged the Department of State to "pay more attention" to Afghanistan and its governing unit, the Taliban, which had received funding from bin Laden. The State Department requested the Taliban to expel bin Laden from the country, noting that he was a sponsor of terrorism and publicly urged Muslims to kill Americans. The Taliban responded that they did not know his whereabouts and, even if they did, he was "not a threat to the United States." The CIA's counter-terrorism division quickly began drafting plans to capture and remove bin Laden from the country. However, Marine General Anthony Zinni and some in the State Department protested the move, saying that the United States should focus instead on ending the Afghan civil war and the Taliban's human rights abuses.

In 1998, Clinton appointed Richard Clarke—who until then served in a drugs and counter-terrorism division of the CIA—to lead an interagency comprehensive counter-terrorism operation, the Counter-terrorism Security Group (CSG). The goal of the CSG was to "detect, deter, and defend against" terrorist attacks. Additionally, Clinton appointed Clarke to sit on the cabinet-level Principals Committee when it met on terrorism issues.

Clinton's Counter-terrorism Center began drafting a plan to ambush bin Laden's compound in Kandahar. The CIA mapped the compound and identified the houses of bin Laden's wives and the location where he most likely slept. The plan was relatively simple, at least on paper. Tribals would "subdue" the guards, enter the compound, take bin Laden to a desert outside Kandahar, and hand him over to another group of tribals. This second group would carry him to a desert landing strip—which had already been tested—where a CIA plane would take him to New York for arraignment. When they completed a draft plan, they ran through two rehearsals in the United States. Confident that the plan would work, the Counter-terrorism Center of the CIA sought the approval of the White House. While they acknowledged that the plan was risky, they stated that there was "a risk in not acting" because "sooner or later, bin Laden will attack U.S. interests, perhaps using WMD."

Clarke reviewed the plans for Sandy Berger, the National Security Director, and told him that it was in the "very early stages of development" and stressed the importance of only targeting bin Laden, not the entire compound. The NSC told the CIA to begin preparing the necessary legal documents to execute the raid.

The senior management of the CIA was skeptical of the plan, and despite objections, canceled the operation, fearing that the risk to their operatives and financial costs were too high. It is unclear whether or not Clinton was aware of the plan.

As the Counter-terrorism Center continued to track bin Laden, they learned in 1998 that the Saudi government had bin Laden cells within the country that were planning attacks on U.S. forces. CIA director George Tenet, encouraged by the Saudi's show of force against bin Laden, asked them to assist in the fight against bin Laden. Clinton named Tenet as his informal "personal representative" to work with Saudi Arabia on terrorism. The Saudis promised Tenet that they would do everything they could to convince the Taliban to release bin Laden for trial in America or elsewhere. The Saudi intelligence chief, Prince Turki bin Faisal, held various meetings with Taliban chief Mullah Omar and other leaders and received assurance that bin Laden would be removed. Omar, however, reneged on that promise.

On August 7, 1998, Bin Laden struck again, this time with simultaneous bombings on the U.S. embassies in Nairobi, Kenya, and Dar es Salaam, Tanzania. (see above) The CIA, having confirmed bin Laden was behind the attack, informed Clinton that terrorist leaders were planning to meet at a camp near Khowst, to plan future attacks. According to Tenet, "several hundred," including bin Laden, would attend. On August 20, Clinton ordered cruise missile strikes on Al-Qaeda terrorist training camps in Afghanistan and a pharmaceutical factory in Khartoum, Sudan, where bin Laden was suspected of manufacturing biological weapons. While the military hit their targets, bin Laden was not killed. The CIA estimated that they had missed bin Laden by "a few hours."

At the time of the attacks, Clinton was embroiled in the Lewinsky scandal (see below). This led many Republicans in Congress to accuse the president of "wagging the dog"—launching a military attack simply to distract the public from his personal problems. Clinton and his principals, however, insist that the decision was made solely on the basis of national security.

After the attacks failed, Clinton moved his focus to diplomatic pressure. On the advice of the State Department, Clinton encouraged Pakistan, whose military intelligence agency was a patron of the Taliban, to pressure the Taliban to remove bin Laden. After numerous meetings with Pakistani prime minister Nawaz Sharif, the Pakistani's would still not cooperate. Sharif eventually agreed to allow the United States to train Pakistani special forces to find bin Laden. When Sharif was ousted by Pervez Musharraf, the plan was abandoned.

After encouragement by Richard Clarke, Clinton issued an executive order in July 1999 declaring the Taliban regime as a state sponsor of terrorism. This was followed in October 1999 by Resolution 1267 sponsored by the United States placing economic and travel sanctions on the Taliban. The Taliban, however, stood by bin Laden, and the United States, along with Russia, proposed yet another UN resolution (Resolution 1333), this time imposing an embargo an arms shipments to the Taliban. The move was meant to weaken the Taliban in their fight against the Northern Alliance in their civil strife. However, the resolution did little to limit the illegal flow of arms from Pakistan.

In August 1999, Clinton signed a Memorandum of Notification ordering the CIA to develop another plan to capture bin Laden, and giving the CIA the authority to order bin Laden be killed.

Near the end of 1999, the Clinton administration, working with the government of Jordan, detected and thwarted a planned terrorist attack to detonate bombs at various New Year millennium celebrations around the world. The CIA confirmed that bin Laden was behind the plot, which was disrupted just days before the New Year. While many credited Clinton's new CSG for playing a role in the foiling of these plots, critics claim it was "mostly luck."

The CIA informed Clinton that they feared the thwarted attacks were just part of a larger series of attacks planned for the new year. Clinton asked Clarke and the CSG to draft plans to "deter and disrupt" al Qaeda attacks.

On October 12, 2000, terrorists bombed USS Cole in the harbor of the Yemeni port of Aden. The attack on USS Cole, a U.S. Navy destroyer, killed 17 Navy sailors, and there was no clear indication during the last months of Clinton's term of who was responsible. The CIA reported that they had "no definitive answer on [the] crucial question of outside direction of the attack—how and by whom. Clinton did not think it would be wise to launch an attack based on a "preliminary judgment," stating that he would have taken further action had he received definitive intelligence. The CIA was eventually able to confirm bin Laden's involvement with certainty a week after the Bush administration took office.

As Clinton's second term drew to a close, the CSG drafted a comprehensive policy paper entitled "Strategy for Eliminating the Threat from the Jihadist Networks of al Qida: Status and Prospects." The paper outlined a method to "roll back" al Qaeda over "a period of three to five years." Clarke stated that while "continued anti-al Qida operations at the current level will prevent some attacks, [it] will not seriously attrit their ability to plan and conduct attacks." This policy paper was forwarded to the incoming Bush administration.

=== Criticism of Bill Clinton's inaction towards Bin Laden ===
In the years since September 11, 2001, Clinton has been subject to criticism that he failed to capture Osama bin Laden as president. In a September 24, 2006, interview with Fox News' Chris Wallace on Fox News Sunday, Clinton challenged his critics. According to Clinton, he faced criticism from various conservatives during his administration for being too obsessed with Bin Laden. Clinton also noted that his administration created the first comprehensive anti-terrorist operation, led by Richard Clarke—whom Clinton accuses the Bush Administration of demoting. Clinton also said he worked hard to try to kill Bin Laden. Former international negotiator and current businessman, financier and media commentator Mansoor Ijaz claimed that from 1996 to 1998, he had opened up unofficial negotiations with Sudan to lift terrorism sanctions from that country in exchange for intelligence information about the terrorist groups Islamic Jihad, Hezbollah and Hamas. He claimed that Sudan was also prepared to offer custody of terrorist mastermind Osama bin Laden, who had been living in the country and launching operations. According to Ijaz, neither Clinton nor National Security Advisor Sandy Berger responded to the situation. Bin Laden later left Sudan and established his operations in Afghanistan under the protection of the Taliban and, with his network, planned out terrorist attacks against American interests worldwide, including attacks on American embassies in Tunisia and Sudan as well as the bombing of USS Cole. The most infamous were the attacks of September 11, 2001 that occurred under Clinton's successor, George W. Bush nine months after Clinton left office. However, the 9/11 Commission Report later found no credible evidence to support the Sudan custody offer as the American ambassador to the Sudan had no legal basis to ask for custody due to no indictment against Bin Laden:

Sudan's minister of defense, Fatih Erwa, has claimed that Sudan offered to hand Bin Ladin over to the United States. The commission has found no credible evidence that this was so. Ambassador Carney had instructions only to push the Sudanese to expel Bin Ladin. Ambassador Carney had no legal basis to ask for more from the Sudanese since, at the time, there was no indictment outstanding.

Clinton acknowledged that, following the bombing on USS Cole, his administration prepared battle plans to execute a military operation in Afghanistan to overthrow the Taliban and search for bin Laden. The plans were never implemented because, according to Clinton, the CIA and FBI refused to certify that bin Laden was responsible for the bombing until after he left office and the military was unable to receive basing rights in Uzbekistan. In relation to Afghanistan, Clinton criticized the Bush Administration when he said "We do have a government that thinks Afghanistan is one-seventh as important as Iraq". Clinton also said that his administration left the plans and a comprehensive anti-terror strategy with the new Bush Administration in January 2001.

In 2014, a September 10, 2001, audio containing Clinton's conversation at a business center at Melbourne, Australia, 10 hours before the 9/11 attacks regarding the topic of terrorism was revealed. In this audio, Clinton stated that according to intelligence agencies, Bin Laden was located in Kandahar, Afghanistan, in December 1998, and thus, a missile strike was proposed. However, he decided not to kill Bin Laden because of conflicting reports of intelligence information to his true whereabouts as well as the potential risk for civilian casualties. He stated that, "I'm just saying, you know, if I were Osama bin Laden—he's a very smart guy, I've spent a lot of time thinking about him—and I nearly got him once." And then he said that, "I nearly got him. And I could have killed him, but I would have to destroy a little town called Kandahar in Afghanistan and kill 300 innocent women and children, and then I would have been no better than him. And so I didn't do it."

== Nuclear issues and nonproliferation ==
In 1996, Clinton signed the United States onto the Comprehensive Test Ban Treaty (CTBT), a landmark international agreement that prohibited all signatory nations from testing nuclear weapons. The following year, he sent the treaty to the Senate for ratification. Conservative Republicans took the lead in defeating the treaty in October 1999 by vote of 48 in favor and 51 against, far short of the two thirds it needed to pass. International reaction to the Senate's action was uniformly negative, and the rejection was a political setback for Clinton, who had lobbied actively for its approval. One scholar blames the failure on:

an accident of politics, an executive- legislative stalemate that resulted from clashing institutional interests, partisan struggle, intraparty factionalism, and personal vindictiveness. Certainly it was a story of zealotry, conspiracy and incompetence in which all the key players share responsibility for an outcome that only a minority really desired.

Despite the rejection of the treaty, Clinton promised that the United States would continue to maintain a policy of not testing nuclear weapons, which had been in place since 1992.

Throughout the 1990s, the Congress refused to appropriate funds for the United States to pay its dues to the United Nations. By 1999 the United States owed the UN at least $1 billion in back dues. That same year Clinton reached a compromise with Republicans in Congress to submit more than $800 million in back dues. Republicans in the House of Representatives had insisted that UN debt repayments be accompanied by restrictions on U.S. funding for international groups that lobbied for abortion rights in foreign countries. Clinton had vetoed similar measures in the past, but he agreed to the restrictions when faced with the prospect that the United States would lose its vote in the UN General Assembly for nonpayment of dues.

== Public response to the Clinton administration's foreign policy ==
During his first term, argues two political scientists:

He earned the nickname "William the Waffler" for his administration's supposed inconsistency in linking rhetoric with policy on human rights violations in China, refugee problems in Cuba and Haiti, and in haphazardly getting the United States involved in the long-running tragic conflict in Bosnia.

Public opinion in the United States about the role the country should have in the Bosnian genocide was negative. A series of Gallup polls through 1995-1997 showed that public disapproval of military intervention in Bosnia hovered around 52%, with the only outlier occurring in January 1997, where 58% of the population disapproved. The polls also found that public opposition was bipartisan, with 49% of Republicans and around 40% of Democrats and Independents disapproving.

Americans were even less supportive of involvement in Kosovo. A Gallup poll in March 1999 showed that about half of the American public supported NATO air strikes in Yugoslavia. That was the weakest support for any American combat mission in the past decade. Fewer people were following the news about US involvement in Kosovo, falling from 43% to 32% in two months.

The public and the media paid little attention to the Rwanda genocide. One reason why the United States did not enter Rwanda is because of the public reluctance to enter combat after the Vietnam War.

== Historiography ==
Critics agree that foreign policy was not a high priority for Clinton and his administration. According to Harvard Professor Stephen Walt:

Critics on the right argue that he is too eager to accommodate a rising China, too blind to Russia's corruption and cronyism, and too slow to use force against states like Yugoslavia or Iraq. On the left, liberals bemoan Clinton's failure to prevent the genocide in Rwanda, his tardy response to the bloodletting in the Balkans, and his abandonment of his early pledge to build a multilateral world order grounded in stronger international institutions. Even pragmatic centrists find him wanting, deriding his foreign policy as "social work" that is too easily swayed by ethnic lobbies, public opinion polls, and media buzz.

Walt, however, gives two cheers for Clinton's realism and his accomplishments:

Under Clinton, the United States consolidated its Cold War victory by bringing three former Warsaw Pact members into its own alliance. It shored up its alliances in East Asia and readied itself for a possible competition with a rising China while encouraging Beijing to accept a status quo that favored the United States....It forced its allies to bear a greater share of the burden in Europe and East Asia while insisting on leading both alliances. And together with its NATO allies, it asserted the right to intervene in the sovereign territory of other states, even without Security Council authorization. Clinton may cloak U.S. policy in the rhetoric of "world order" and general global interests, but its defining essence remains the unilateral exercise of sovereign power.

Historians and political scientists evaluated Clinton's immediate predecessors in terms of how well they handle the Cold War. A dilemma arises regarding what criteria to use regarding presidential administrations after the Cold War ended. Historians have debated, with inconclusive results, on the question of whether there was a consistent overall theme or schema to Clintonian foreign policy, or what scholars would call a "Clinton Doctrine". The Economist magazine reported that Henry Kissinger echoed a frequent complaint when he characterized the Clinton foreign policy as less a grand design than "a series of seemingly unrelated decisions in response to specific crises." Dumbrell however notes that Douglas Brinkley and others have identified a Clinton doctrine in terms of systematic efforts to expand democracy in the world. Other experts have pointed to the Clintonian emphasis on humanitarianism, especially when military intervention was called for. Democracy and humanitarianism represent the idealistic tradition in American foreign policy. Critics of Clintonianism have drawn upon the warnings of George Kennan (1904–2005), an exponent of the realist tradition. Kennan argued that idealism made poor policy, and according to Richard Russell, believed idealism that ignored the realities of power and the national interest would be self-defeating and erode American power.

Dumbrell also sees several other possible Clinton doctrines, including perhaps a systematic reluctance to become involved in foreign complications far from the American shore. Dumbrell favorite candidate is the explicit Clinton administration policy of warning "rogue" states on their misbehavior, using American military intervention as a threat. He traces the origins of this policy to Jimmy Carter and Ronald Reagan, arguing that the Clinton administration made it more systematic so it deserves the term "Clinton Doctrine". However, Dumbrell concludes, it did not prove successful in practice.

From Tokyo former prime minister Yasuhiro Nakasone uses Clinton's own priority of economics to identify his most significant and substantial achievements:

- Unprecedented US prosperity which led to sustained global recovery.
- Global leadership in information technology.
- Ratification of NAFTA.
- Expanding NATO eastward.
- Approval of the Chemical Weapons Convention.

== See also ==
- Presidency of Bill Clinton
- List of international presidential trips made by Bill Clinton
- List of international trips made by Warren Christopher as United States Secretary of State
- List of international trips made by Madeleine Albright as United States Secretary of State
- International relations since 1989
- Jean Chrétien, Prime Minister of Canada
