= Sandy Berger =

American political advisor (1945–2015)

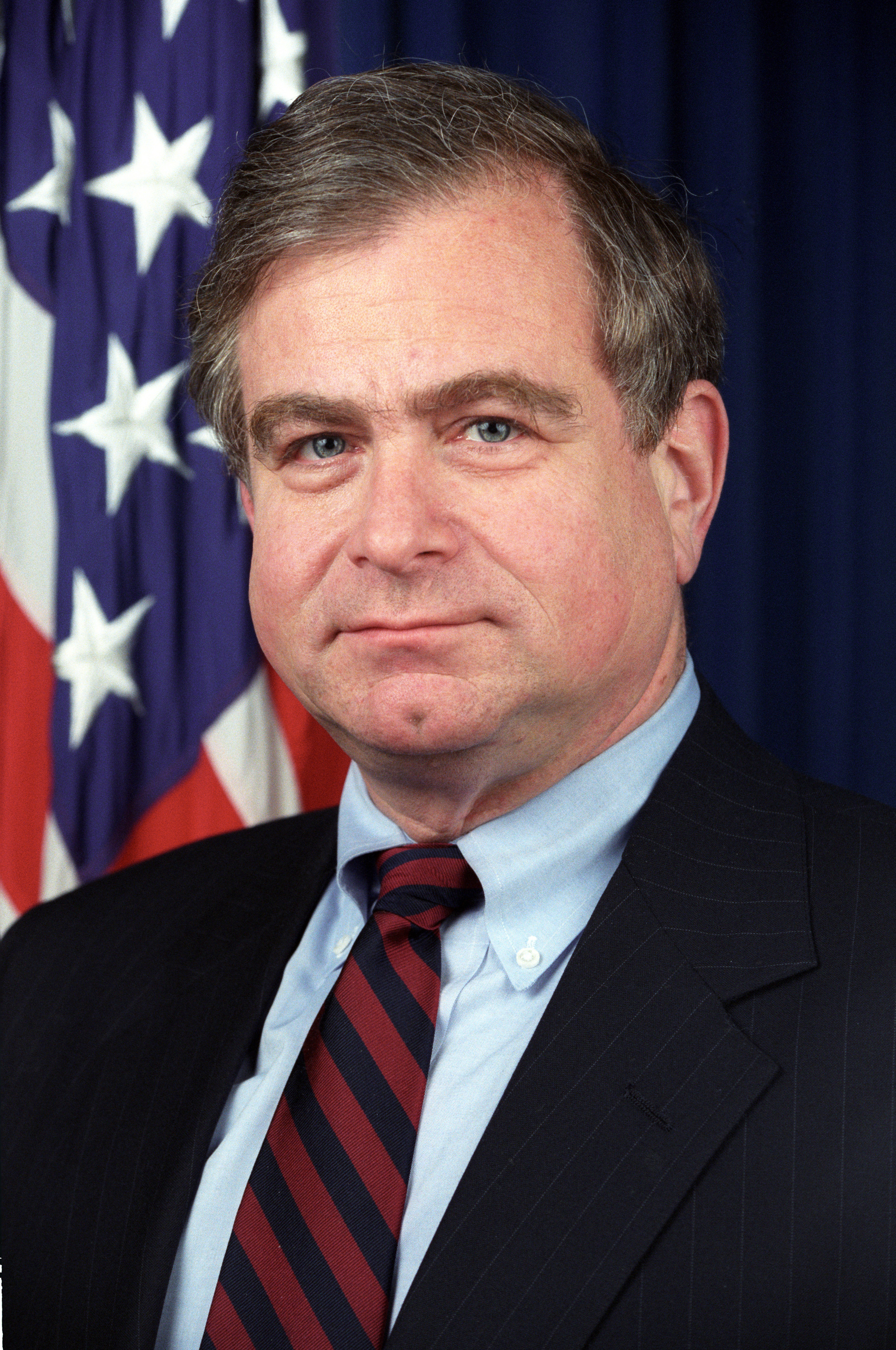

18th United States National Security Advisor
- In office March 14, 1997 – January 20, 2001
- President: Bill Clinton
- Deputy: James Steinberg
- Preceded by: Anthony Lake
- Succeeded by: Condoleezza Rice

19th United States Deputy National Security Advisor
- In office January 20, 1993 – March 14, 1997
- President: Bill Clinton
- Preceded by: Jonathan Howe
- Succeeded by: James Steinberg

Personal details
- Born: Samuel Richard Berger; October 28, 1945 Millerton, New York, U.S.
- Died: December 2, 2015 (aged 70) Washington, DC, U.S.
- Party: Democratic
- Spouse: Susan Harrison
- Children: 3
- Education: Cornell University (BA); Harvard University (JD)

Samuel Richard "Sandy" Berger (October 28, 1945 – December 2, 2015) was a Democratic attorney who served as the 18th US National Security Advisor for U.S. President Bill Clinton from 1997 to 2001 after he had served as the Deputy National Security Advisor for the Clinton administration from 1993 to 1997.

In 2005, he was fined and sentenced to two years of probation, plus community service, for the unauthorized removal of classified material from the National Archives. When disbarment proceedings were initiated on account of his theft of documents, Berger gave up his license to practice law by conceding the truth of the material allegations of misconduct and consenting to his disbarment.

== Early life and career ==
Berger was born to a Jewish family in Millerton, New York, where his parents ran a surplus store. He graduated from Webutuck High School in 1963, earned his Bachelor of Arts degree in government from Cornell University in 1967, and his earned Juris Doctor degree from Harvard Law School in 1971.

At Cornell, Berger was a member of the Quill and Dagger society with Paul Wolfowitz and Stephen Hadley. Opposed to the Vietnam War, Berger began working for Senator George McGovern's presidential campaign in 1972. While there, he met Bill Clinton, forming a friendship that lasted for decades. Berger later urged Clinton to run for President of the United States.

After the McGovern campaign, Berger gained experience working in a variety of government posts, including serving as Special Assistant to Mayor of New York City John Lindsay and Legislative Assistant to U.S. Senator Harold Hughes of Iowa and Congressman Joseph Resnick of New York. He was also Deputy Director of Policy Planning for the U.S. Department of State from 1977 to 1980 under Secretary of State Cyrus Vance during the Carter administration.

After leaving the State Department, Berger went on to join the law firm Hogan & Hartson where he helped expand the firm's international law practice. As a partner, he opened the firm's first two international offices, in London and Brussels. "Sandy Berger", Nancy Pelosi said in 1997, "was the point-man at ... Hogan & Hartson ... for the trade office of the Chinese government. He was a lawyer-lobbyist."

== Clinton administration ==
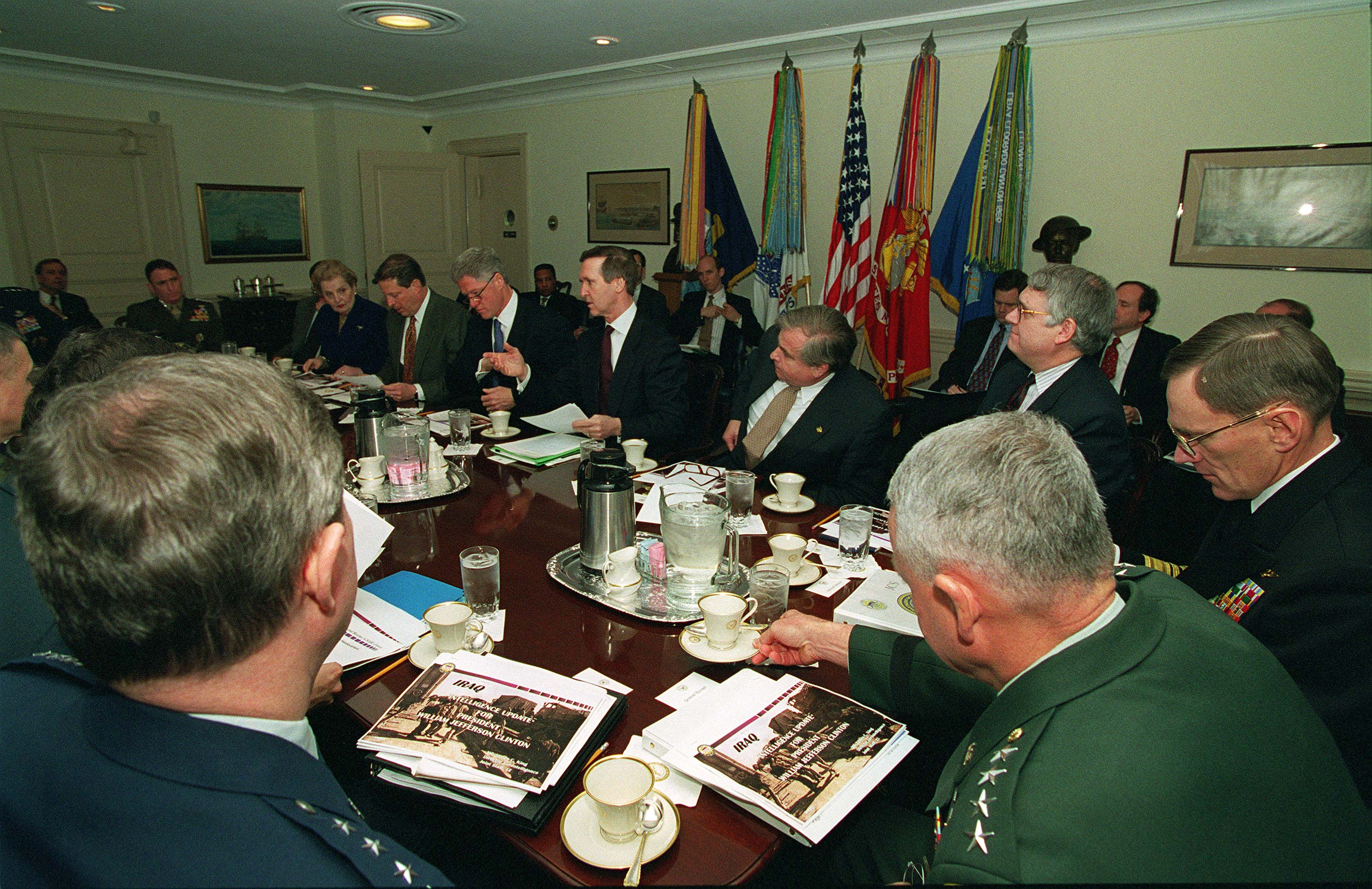
Secretary of Defense William S. Cohen (center and pointing hand) gives the opening remarks at a Pentagon briefing for President Bill Clinton and Vice President Al Gore on February 17, 1998. Clinton was in the Pentagon to meet with the Joint Chiefs of Staff and his national security team for a Gulf region update. Berger is seated to Cohen's left.

Berger served as Senior Foreign Policy Advisor to Governor Clinton during the campaign, and as Assistant Transition Director for National Security of the 1992 Clinton-Gore Transition. Berger served eight years on the National Security Council staff, first from 1993 to 1997 as deputy national security advisor, under Anthony Lake, whom Berger had recommended for the role, and then succeeding Lake as Assistant to the President for National Security Affairs from 1997 to 2001.

Berger was a central figure in formulating the foreign policy of the Clinton Administration, and played an integral role advancing the administration's self-described objectives of advancing "democracy, shared prosperity, and peace." In President Clinton's words, "Nobody was more knowledgeable about policy or smarter about how to formulate it. He was both great in analyzing a situation and figuring out what to do about it. His gifts proved invaluable time and time again, in Latin America, the Balkans, Northern Ireland, and the Middle East."

Key achievements during Berger's NSC tenure included the 1995 peso recovery package in Mexico, NATO enlargement, Operation Desert Fox, the Dayton Accords that ended the civil conflict in Bosnia, the NATO bombing campaign against Yugoslavia, the Good Friday Agreement that helped bring about peace in Northern Ireland, and the administration's policy of engagement with the People's Republic of China. In a March 2005 oral history interview at the University of Virginia's Miller Center, Berger noted, "I think during the '90s we took China from outside the international system and brought it inside the international system, partly through trade, and economics, and otherwise."

On July 4, 1999, in what South Asia expert Bruce Reidel called Berger's "finest hour," Berger advised President Clinton through a pivotal negotiation with Pakistan's prime minister Nawaz Sharif to pull that country's troops back from Kashmir, averting a potentially cataclysmic nuclear war with India.

Berger also advised the President regarding the Khobar Towers bombing and responses to the terrorist bombings of American embassies in Kenya and Tanzania. In the final years of the Clinton administration, combating terrorism was the paramount foreign policy priority; Berger said in his March 2005 oral history interview at UVA's Miller Center, "I said to Condoleezza Rice during the transition ... that the number-one issue that she would deal with as national security advisor was terrorism in general and al-Qaeda specifically."

== Controversies ==
=== Stock ownership ===
In November 1997, Berger paid a $23,000 civil penalty to settle conflict of interest allegations stemming from his failure to sell his stock of Amoco Corporation as ordered by the White House. Berger was advised by the White House to sell the stock in early 1994. He said he had planned to sell the stock, but then forgot. He denied knowingly participating in decisions in which he had a financial interest. With no evidence that Berger intended to break the law, the United States Department of Justice determined a civil penalty was adequate for a "non-willful violation" of the conflict of interest law.

=== Chinese nuclear espionage ===
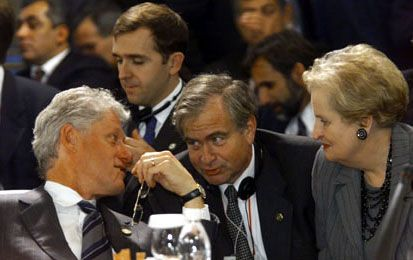
Sandy Berger with President Clinton and Secretary of State Madeleine Albright.

In 1999, Berger was criticized for failing to promptly inform President Clinton of his knowledge that the People's Republic of China had managed to acquire the designs of a number of U.S. nuclear warheads. Berger was originally briefed of the espionage by the Department of Energy (DOE) in April 1996, but did not inform the president until July 1997.

A number of Republicans, including then presidential hopeful Lamar Alexander, called for Berger's resignation. They accused him of ignoring the allegations of Chinese espionage. "For his unwillingness to act on this serious matter, Mr. Berger should resign", Alexander said. "If he does not, he should be relieved of his duties by President Clinton." President Clinton rejected the calls: "The record is that we acted aggressively," Clinton said. "Mr. Berger acted appropriately."

I asked DOE to widen and deepen its investigation, to intensify as they were planning their counterintelligence efforts to brief the Congress. Within several weeks the FBI had opened up a full investigation on the prime suspect. So I took the actions that I believe were appropriate. I get an awful lot of threat information every day. I have to make a judgment as to what I brief the president on and what I don't. In 1997, when this was clearly a pattern and a systemic problem, I thought it was essential for the president to know — Sandy Berger, May 29, 1999.

=== Unauthorized removal and destruction of classified material ===
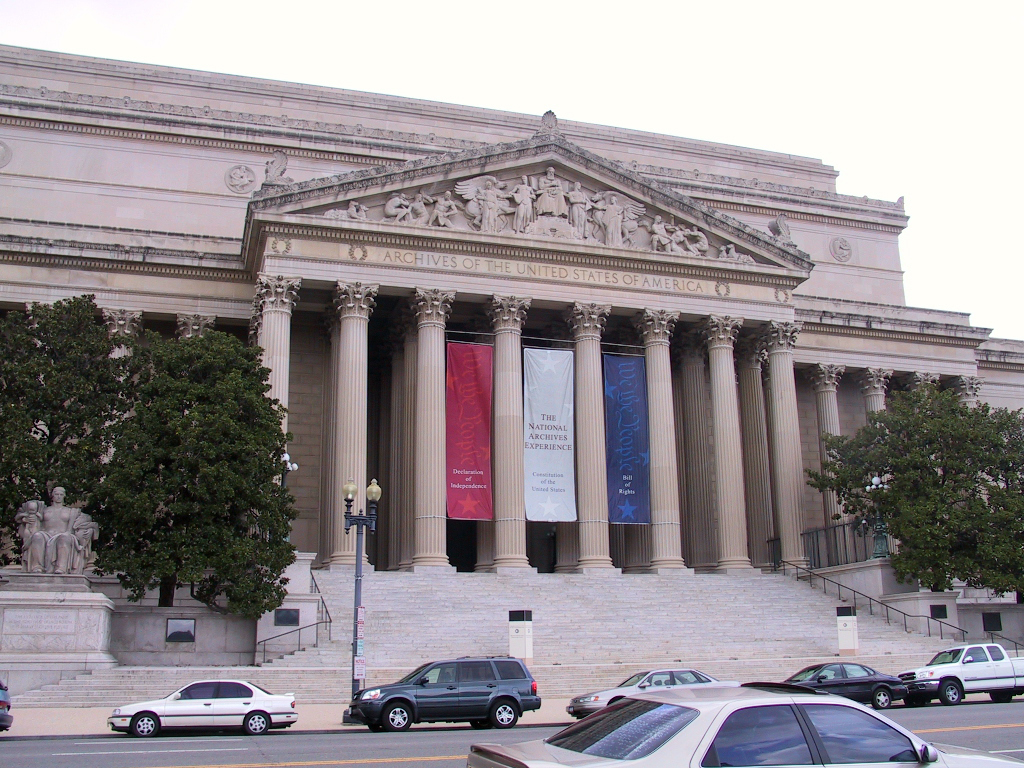
The National Archives building in Washington, D.C.

On July 19, 2004, it was revealed that the United States Department of Justice was investigating Berger for unauthorized removal of classified documents in October 2003 from a National Archives reading room prior to testifying before the 9/11 Commission. The documents were five classified copies of a single report commissioned from Richard Clarke covering internal assessments of the Clinton Administration's handling of the unsuccessful 2000 millennium attack plots. An associate of Berger said Berger took one copy in September 2003 and four copies in October 2003, allegedly by stuffing the documents into his socks and pants. Berger subsequently lied to investigators when questioned about the removal of the documents.

In April 2005, Berger pleaded guilty to a misdemeanor charge of unauthorized removal and retention of classified material from the National Archives in Washington, D.C.

Berger was fined $50,000, sentenced to serve two years of probation and 100 hours of community service, and stripped of his security clearance for three years. The Justice Department initially said Berger only stole copies of classified documents and not originals, but the House Government Reform Committee later revealed that an unsupervised Berger had been given access to classified files of original, uncopied, uninventoried documents on terrorism. During the House Government Reform Committee hearings, Nancy Kegan Smith — who was the director of the presidential documents staff at the National Archives and Records Administration — acknowledged that she had granted Berger access to original materials in her office.

On December 20, 2006, Inspector General Paul Brachfeld reported that Berger took a break to go outside without an escort. "In total, during this visit, he removed four documents ... Mr. Berger said he placed the documents under a trailer in an accessible construction area outside Archives 1 (the main Archives building)". Berger acknowledged having later retrieved the documents from the construction area and returned with them to his office.

The Board on Professional Responsibility of the Bar of the District of Columbia Court of Appeals commenced a professional-misconduct disciplinary proceeding against Berger, based on his conviction for theft of classified documents. On May 17, 2007, Berger was disbarred from the practice of law upon consenting to his disbarment, conceding that the material allegations of misconduct were true and he knew that he could not successfully defend against the disciplinary proceeding. He released a statement which said, in part, "I have decided to voluntarily relinquish my license. ... While I derived great satisfaction from years of practicing law, I have not done so for 15 years and do not envision returning to the profession. I am very sorry for what I did, and I deeply apologize." By consenting to disbarment, Berger avoided cross-examination by the Bar Counsel regarding details of his thefts.

== Post-government ==
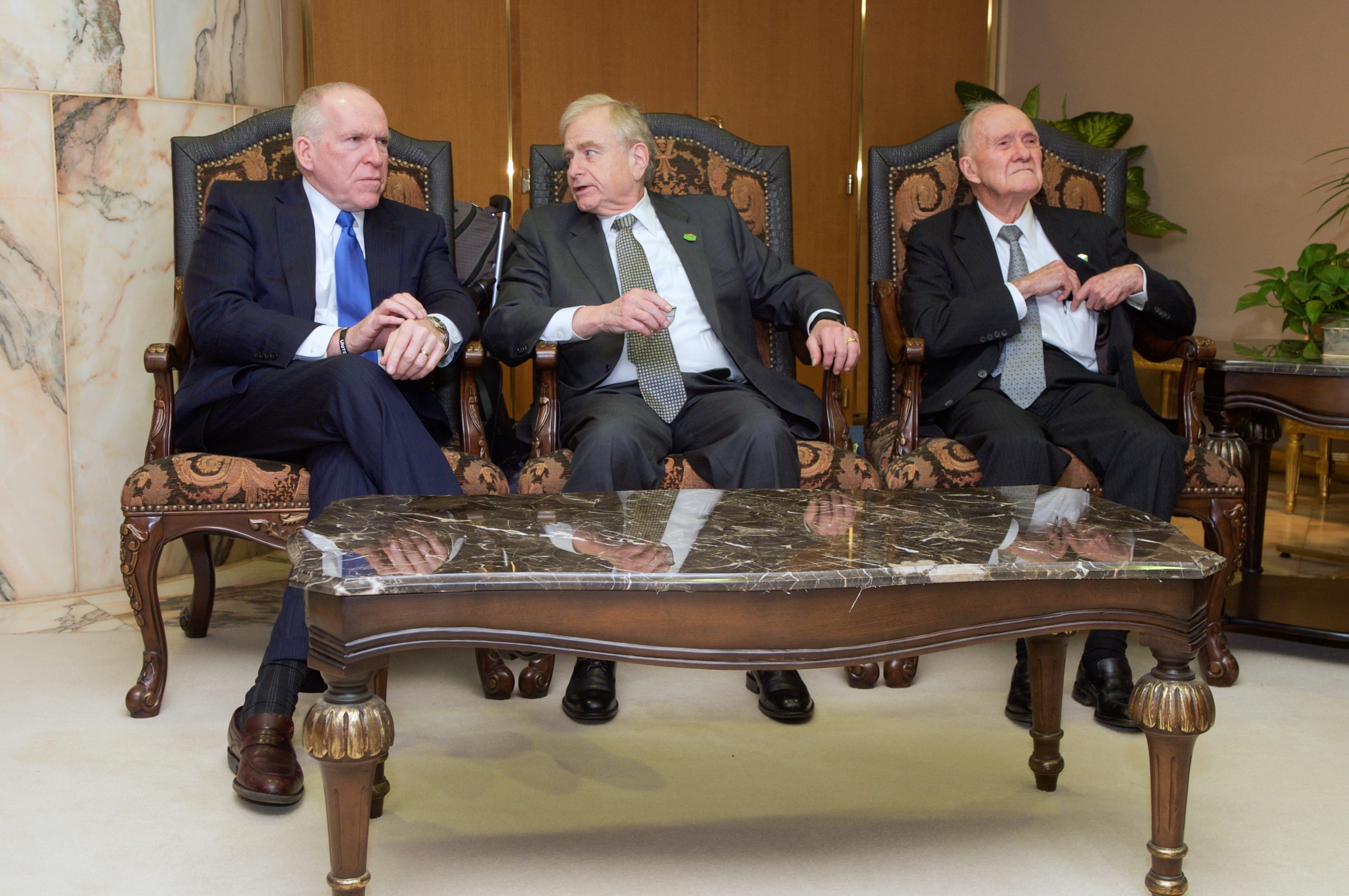
Berger with CIA Director John Brennan (l) and Brent Scowcroft (r) before greeting the new King Salman of Saudi Arabia, in Riyadh, Saudi Arabia, in January 2015

After leaving the Clinton Administration, Berger became chairman of Stonebridge International, an international advisory firm he co-founded in 2001 which focused on aiding companies in their expansion into emerging markets such as Brazil, China, India, and Russia. Stonebridge International merged in 2009 with The Albright Group, a similar firm founded by former U.S. Secretary of State Madeleine Albright, to form Albright Stonebridge Group, a global strategy and commercial diplomacy firm acquired by Dentons in 2021.

Berger was also chairman of the D.B. Zwirn Global Advisory Board, an international investment fund and merchant capital provider founded in 2001 and with offices throughout North America, Europe and Asia.

In late 2003, Berger was called to testify before the 9/11 Commission regarding steps taken against terrorism during his tenure and the information he provided to his successor, Condoleezza Rice. At the time, he was also acting as an informal foreign policy advisor to Senator John Kerry during his campaign for the presidency, resigning from the role amid controversy regarding his preparations for testifying before the 9/11 Commission. Berger served as a foreign policy adviser to Senator Hillary Clinton in her 2008 presidential campaign.

He was an advisory board member for the Partnership for a Secure America, a not-for-profit organization dedicated to recreating the bipartisan center in American national security and foreign policy. He also served on the International Advisory Council of the Brookings Doha Center. He served on the board of directors of the International Crisis Group and World Food Program USA, and also on the advisory boards of the National Security Network, and America Abroad Media.

== Personal life and death ==
Berger lived in the American University Park neighborhood of Washington, D.C., was married to Susan Harrison Berger, and had three children.

Berger died of cancer in Washington, D.C., on December 2, 2015, at the age of 70, more than a year after being diagnosed.

President Barack Obama released the following statement on learning of Berger's death:

Sandy Berger was one of our nation's foremost national security leaders. From his service in President Carter's State Department to President Clinton's National Security Advisor, Sandy devoted himself to strengthening American leadership in an uncertain world. Today, his legacy can be seen in a peaceful Balkans, our strong alliance with Japan, our deeper relationships with India and China. Around the globe, families and children are living healthier, more secure lives because, as a private citizen, Sandy was a humanitarian who helped the world respond to crises and feed the hungry. With his trademark passion, wisdom and good humor, he is remembered fondly within the ranks of the National Security Council, where those he mentored carry on his work. I'm grateful to Sandy because, as President, I've benefited personally from his advice and counsel.

== Awards ==
In November 2015, Berger was awarded the Grand Cordon of the Order of the Rising Sun by the Japanese government for his contributions to promotion of a strong and friendly relationship between the United States and Japan, particularly in his role as National Security Adviser to President Clinton. He also provided legal and commercial advice to the Embassy of Japan in Washington, D.C.

On December 1, 2015, World Food Program USA announced that it has given its inaugural Global Humanitarian Award to Samuel R. Berger in recognition of his decades of leadership helping families in need across the globe. Additionally, the World Food Program USA established the Samuel R. Berger Humanitarian Fund, which will support humanitarian organizations as they work to eradicate hunger around the world.

In 2000, Berger was presented with an honorary degree from Tel Aviv University in Israel.

== See also ==
- Presidency of Bill Clinton
- Foreign policy of the Bill Clinton administration
- History of the United States National Security Council 1993–present
- Iraq disarmament timeline 1990–2003
- Mary McCarthy (CIA)

Political offices
Preceded by Jonathan Howe	Deputy National Security Advisor; 1993–1997	Succeeded by Jim Steinberg
Preceded by Tony Lake	National Security Advisor; 1997–2001	Succeeded by Condoleezza Rice
