= Dual containment =

Former United States foreign policy

Dual containment was an official US foreign policy aimed at containing Ba'athist Iraq and Revolutionary Iran. The term was first officially used in May 1993 by Martin Indyk at the Washington Institute for Near East Policy and officially announced on February 24, 1994, at a symposium of the Middle East Policy Council by Indyk, who was the senior director for Middle East Affairs of the National Security Council (NSC).

Clinton's policy of dual containment aimed at restraining both Iran and Iraq from taking actions seen as harmful to the interests of the international community, especially those of the United States. This marked a shift from earlier strategies that sought to balance power between the two countries by countering whichever posed the greater threat at a given time.

== Rationale ==
The United States had a longstanding strategic doctrine in the Middle East not to let any country become so powerful that it could control the entire Gulf Region's oil supply. For that reason, the US looked to both Saudi Arabia and Iran, under the Shah, as "twin pillars" of regional security. (See offshore balancing.)

Clinton wanted to make the Israeli–Palestinian peace process a major priority in his foreign policy and so he wanted to ensure Iraq and Iran would not be in a position to interfere with that agenda. Iraq was already under containment by the US and its allies in the form of the Iraqi no-fly zones. Iran had been cut off from the US ever since the Iranian Revolution in 1979. Although Clinton held out hope for eventual changes in regime policy from those countries, containment seemed to be the only viable option for the near future.

Although the US had planned in the 1980s to balance Iraq and Iran against each other directly, that had become untenable and unnecessary by the early 1990s. Both countries had been exhausted militarily and financially from the Iran–Iraq War. Also, the Soviet Union was no longer around to be a security benefactor for either country.

Clinton tasked his national security advisor, Tony Lake, with crafting a new strategy.

== Policy vision and implementation ==
=== Iraq ===
The Joint Chiefs of Staff favored exploring dialogue with Saddam, but US Secretary of Defense Les Aspin, the CIA, and the US State Department wanted a harder line. The State Department, however, was concerned about the possibility of a sectarian war if Saddam was overthrown. It settled on an approach that was called "aggressive containment," a strategy of containment "through sanctions and the occasional resort to force."

Lake rejected giving the CIA immediate authority to begin exploring options of a potential officer-led coup against Saddam. However, it was agreed that the administration would give political to support to the Iraqi National Congress and would continue the no-fly zones protecting Kurdish and Shia populations in Iraq.

The U.S. dual containment policy toward Iraq also included covert efforts to achieve regime change. Following the establishment of the northern safe haven in 1991, intended to provide humanitarian relief and stem the flow of Kurdish refugees into neighboring countries, the region became a secure base for opposition movements. The Iraqi National Congress (INC), a coalition of opposition groups, was formed and supported covertly by the CIA. This support included the provision of funds, armaments, and logistical aid to foster an insurgency that would weaken Saddam Hussein's regime and pave the way for an internal coup d'état. These efforts marked a significant tactical shift, with regime change being pursued covertly under the guise of containment.

Anthony Lake, National Security Advisor under President Clinton, later acknowledged that while containment was officially framed as upholding UN resolutions, it was, in effect, a tactical tool to achieve the broader strategic goal of regime change. The administration avoided explicitly stating this goal to maintain the coalition formed after the Gulf War, as an explicit call for regime change would have exceeded the UN mandate.

Clinton authorized the use of punitive military force against Saddam's regime as part of this strategy, such as in 1993, when it was discovered that the Iraqi leader had plotted to assassinate George H. W. Bush, and in 1998 when Saddam expelled United Nations weapons inspectors.

=== Iran ===
Clinton's team saw Iran as a "rogue state" that was fundamentally opposed to American interests in the Middle East.

Overthrow was not a viable policy option because of the lack of organized opposition or American intelligence assets on the ground. Positive inducement to behavioral changes was also dismissed because of the Iranian regime's deep distrust of the US. Finally, punitive military action was ruled out on the grounds that Iran's retaliatory capabilities were considered too great, and the benefits of the strikes were too uncertain. Thus, it was decided to continue American efforts to prevent Iran's acquisition of ballistic missiles and access to international finance.

That approach, known as "active containment," was designed to convince the Iranian elite to pursue rapprochement with the West over time.

On May 6, 1995, Clinton signed an executive order to bolster the Iranian containment. It banned arms sales to Iran, such as dual-use technologies, and imports of Iranian goods. It also established a diplomatic position of blocking Iran from all international lending.

== Reception ==
According to Indyk, King Fahd of Saudi Arabia tried to show support for the policy by promising to buy dozens of Boeing and McDonnell Douglas civilian airliners in mid-1993 to ensure that US industries could count on financial support from Saudi Arabia even without the opportunities that would have been afforded them with a rapprochement with Iran.

However, the United Arab Emirates by the late 1990s told US officials that they thought that Saddam was meeting his international obligations and that containment of Iraq was no longer necessary. The policy became increasingly unpopular internationally, and the sanctions had weakened significantly by 2000.

Daniel Pipes supported the policy in a testimony to the US Congress in March 1995 and gave praise for its strategy and policy but criticized the tactics of its implementation. He said that US policy should not be forced to engage Iran or Iraq unless either acted responsibly.

Articles in Foreign Affairs and for the Cato Institute in 1994 criticized dual containment as "shot through with logical flaws and practical inconsistencies and is based on faulty geopolitical premises" and one that required "a prolonged U.S. military presence in the Persian Gulf region."

== Resemblance to Kennan's containment of Soviet Union ==
The idea was inspired by George F. Kennan's ideas of containment of the Soviet Union during the Cold War, but critics have argued that it did not respect Kennan's key demand for containment to succeed: the principle of power-balancing.

According to Kennan, the United States and the Soviet Union should respect the other's spheres of interest. That way the two could get along, build themselves up, and develop their societies. However, they must under no circumstances go to war with each other. To be sure, with two diametrically opposed systems, relations would never be warm, or even co-operative. However, as long as neither tried to destroy each other, catastrophe could be avoided.

What Kennan was expressing was the concept of balancing, the idea that in the world of international politics, a proper balance could be struck between potential adversaries, which would produce a stable situation that could be prolonged indefinitely.

In the case of Iraq and Iran in the 1990s, US policymakers confronted them with what amounted to a diktat since both had to remake themselves according to US desires, or the US would simply keep up the sanctions until they did.

== Consequences ==
As a consequence of the policy, the U.S. had to station large number of troops nearby. Troops were stationed in Saudi Arabia, an area that many in the region regard as "holy soil," which offended many locals and is cited by Osama bin Laden as one reason for his hatred against the United States policies and part of his motivation for the September 11 attacks.

Traditional American policies had been not to engage with troops on the ground in the Middle East, but to stay "over the horizon", ready to move in at short notice. The only time the U.S. had deviated from this policy was during its intervention in the civil war in Lebanon, and that led to the 1983 Beirut barracks bombing.

By the mid-1990s there was considerable dissatisfaction with dual containment, because it made the United States the mortal enemy of two countries that hated each other, and forced Washington to bear the burden of containing both. Pressed by the American Israel Public Affairs Committee and other pro-Israel forces, Clinton toughened up the policy in the spring of 1995 by imposing an economic embargo on Iran. But AIPAC and the others wanted more. The result was the Iran and Libya Sanctions Act of 1996, which imposed sanctions on any foreign company investing more than $40 million to develop petroleum resources in Iran or Libya.

The covert support for opposition groups, combined with the establishment of a northern safe haven, had significant consequences for regional stability. While these measures empowered Kurdish factions and other opposition movements, they also deepened Iraq's internal divisions and created long-term governance challenges. Critics have argued that this tactical focus on containment and covert regime change came at the expense of a coherent strategic vision for Iraq's future. Furthermore, the lack of explicit acknowledgment of regime change as a policy objective created diplomatic tensions, particularly with coalition partners such as Turkey and Saudi Arabia, who had concerns about the broader implications of U.S. actions in Iraq.

The sanctions against Iraq came to be criticized domestically in the United States and in other countries because of the humanitarian toll that they took on civilian Iraqis. The figure of 500,000 child deaths was for a long period widely cited, but recent research has shown that that figure was the result of survey data manipulated by the Saddam Hussein regime and that "there was no major rise in child mortality in Iraq after 1990 and during the period of the sanctions."

== End ==
By the late 1990s, however, neoconservatives were arguing that dual containment was not enough and that regime change in Iraq was essential. By toppling Saddam and turning Iraq into a vibrant democracy, they argued that the US would trigger a far-reaching process of change throughout the Middle East. The same line of thinking was evident in the study "A Clean Break," which was written by neoconservatives for Benjamin Netanyahu although he rejected it.

== See also ==
- Axis of evil
- Iran–United States relations
- Iraq–United States relations
- United States sanctions against Iran
- United States foreign policy in the Middle East
