= Project Solarium =

1953 American foreign-policy exercise

Project Solarium was an American national-level exercise in strategy and foreign policy design convened by President Dwight D. Eisenhower in the summer of 1953. It was intended to produce consensus among senior officials in the national security community on the most effective strategy for responding to Soviet expansionism in the wake of the early Cold War. The exercise was the product of a series of conversations between President Eisenhower and senior cabinet-level officials, including Secretary of State John Foster Dulles and George F. Kennan, in the Solarium room on the top floor of the White House. Through these conversations, Eisenhower realized that strategic guidance set forth in NSC 68 under the Truman administration was insufficient to address the breadth of issues with which his administration was presented, and that his cabinet was badly divided on the correct course of action to deal with the Soviet Union. He found that internal political posturing threatened to undermine policy planning, and thus U.S. national security.

Project Solarium's findings produced NSC 162/2, a national strategy directive commonly assessed to have guided U.S. strategy from its publication to the end of the Cold War.

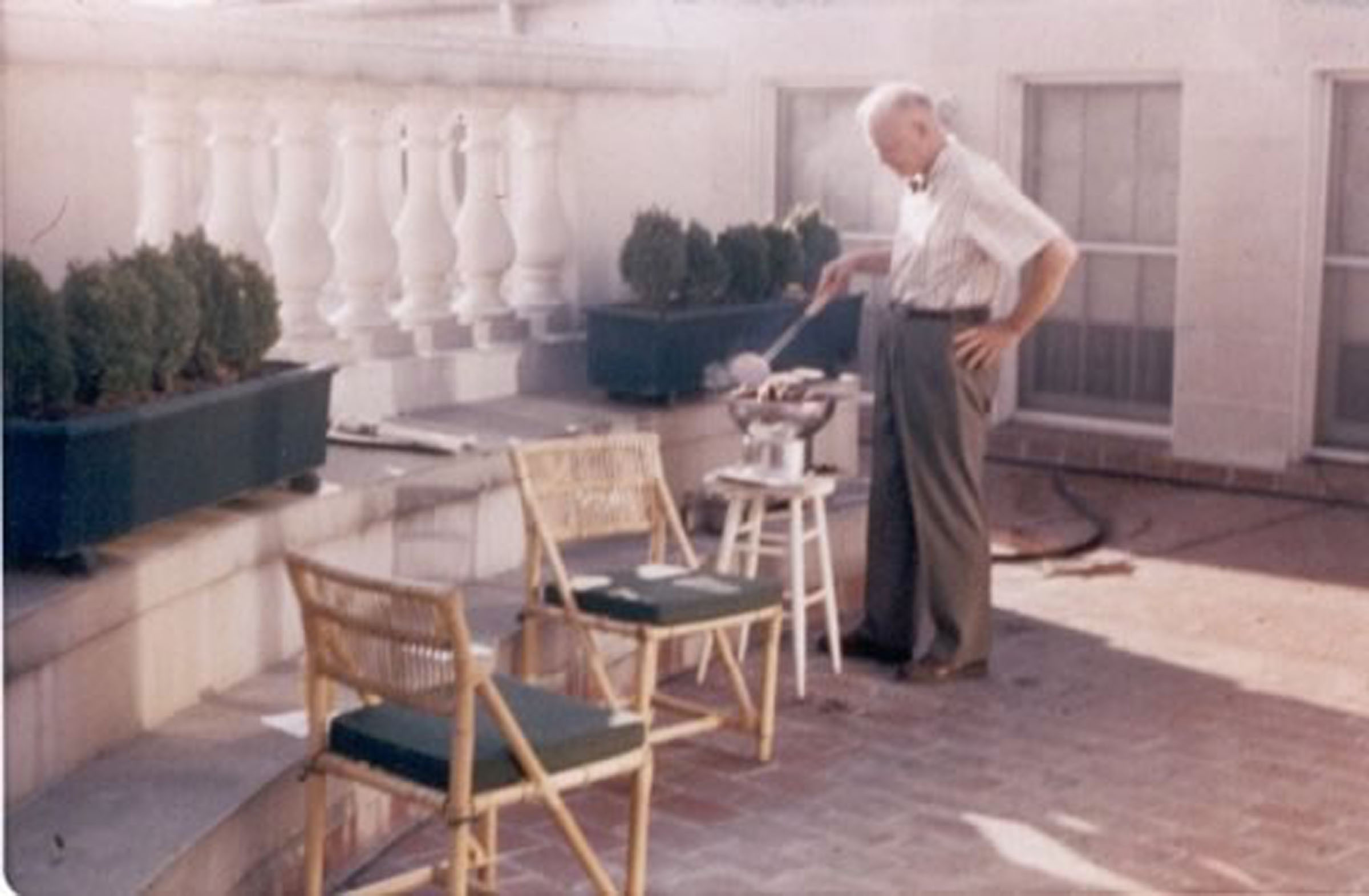
President Eisenhower cooking quail in the White House Solarium

== History ==
On the heels of his 'Cross of Iron' speech in April 1953, Eisenhower was increasingly concerned about the trajectory of U.S. foreign policy, which took a militaristic approach to the Soviet Union. Eisenhower's campaign platform included harsh criticism of unsustainable military expenditures as a danger to the stability and long-term growth of the U.S. economy. Senior figures in his administration were generally split into two camps over the nature of the United States' policy of engagement towards the Soviet Union: one group asserted that the U.S. must actively combat and "roll back" the sphere of Soviet influence, while the other supported the "strategy of containment" espoused by George F. Kennan, the author of the Long Telegram and erstwhile director of the Policy Planning staff at the State Department.

Eisenhower realized that unless his administration could agree on a narrative for countering the Soviet Union, efforts to further competing agendas would produce incoherence instead. So the president ordered that a strategy design exercise be convened to help his senior staff come to agreement.

=== Process structure ===
The exercise created three teams, or Task Forces, composed of leading experts from the federal government and academia known for their particular knowledge of Soviet strategy, politics, economics, military capability, intelligence activities, diplomatic posture and history. Each team received the same reference documents and intelligence assessments and was assigned to analyze and present a supporting case for one of three overarching themes as the basis for U.S. policy on the Soviet Union.

Each Task Force was initially set the task of analyzing its given position and providing critical assessment of that position's efficacy, including its strengths and weaknesses. Though Eisenhower realized that the three courses of action to be analyzed could be combined or modified in any number of varying interpretations, he thought it most effective to set down three specific lines of thought for comparison to ensure that all three positions could be evaluated on their own merit.

Each task force met individually or in plenary format between June 10 and July 15, 1953, then submitted summary reports of their findings to Eisenhower and the National Security Council.

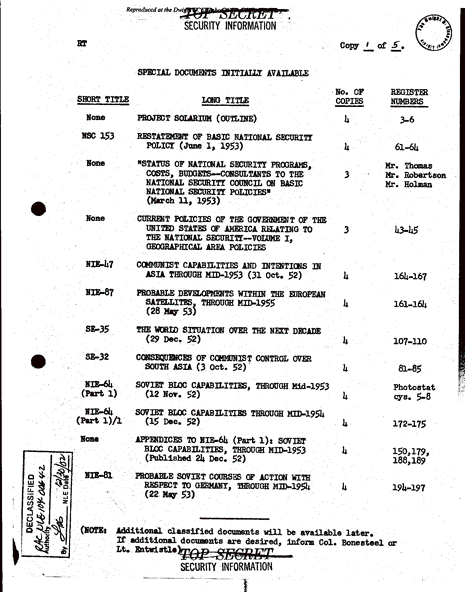
Solarium Documents

=== Team A ===
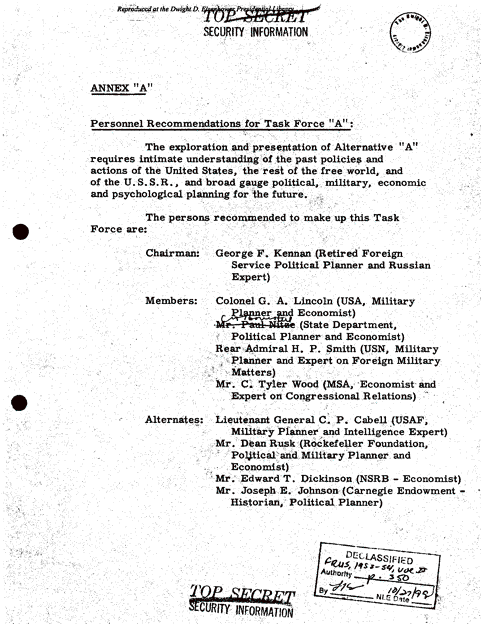
Solarium Documents

Led by Kennan, Team A was bound to a mainly political strategy toward the Soviet Union, focused primarily on Europe, and eschewing significant military commitments elsewhere. It also relied heavily on U.S. allies and alliance cohesion. Team A would make the best possible argument for the existing policy of containment, seeking to prevent Soviet expansion in Europe while minimizing the risk of general war.

Although Team A's report is widely seen as the "containment option" of Project Solarium, some scholars argue that "Task Force A supported a policy that went well beyond traditional conceptions of containment." According to Gregory Mitrovich,

What most differentiated Task Force A from the other task forces was the limitation that its proposed policy actions not raise the risk of war and not harm U.S. relations with the allies, restrictions that did not apply to Task Force C. Consequently, Task Force A restricted itself to proposing largely diplomatic and covert measures that it believed would simultaneously reduce Soviet power, change Soviet behaviour, and strengthen the free-world coalition.

Team A consisted of Chairman Kennan, C. Tyler Wood, Rear Admiral H. P. Smith, Army Colonel George A. Lincoln, Army Colonel Charles H. Bonesteel III, Navy Captain H. E. Sears, and John M. Maury of the CIA.

=== Team B ===
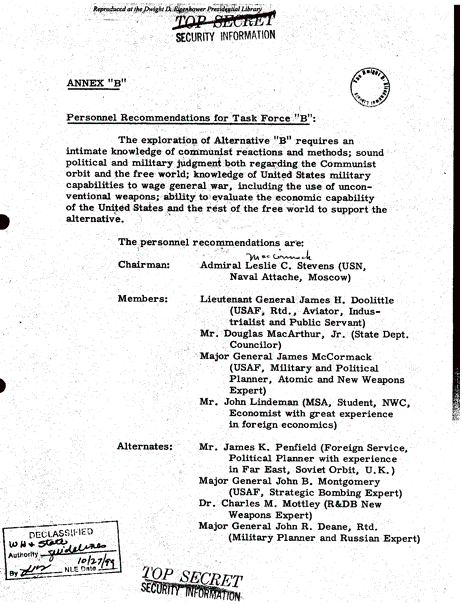
Solarium Documents

Eisenhower gave Team B a similar mandate but allowed it to take a harder line towards the Soviet Union, and instructed it to contemplate policies that relied less on allies and more on the U.S. nuclear arsenal. It was given, therefore, a more unilateral mission but one that nevertheless held to a clear line against taking direct military action within the Soviet sphere of influence. Team B would accept containment as a viable policy, but be less tentative about its implementation. It would assert that any Soviet or Soviet-sponsored aggression would lead to general war and threaten massive U.S. and allied retaliation using any means necessary.

Team B included Army Major General James McCormack, John C. Campbell, retired Army Major General John R. Deane, Calvin B. Hoover, Air Force Colonel Elvin S. Ligon, Philip E. Mosely, and James K. Penfield.

=== Team C ===
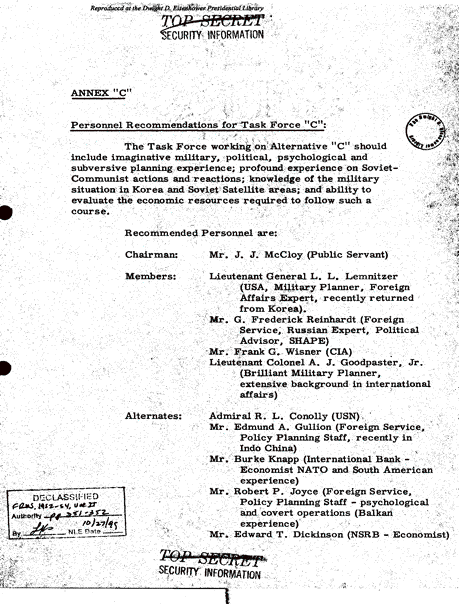
Solarium Documents

Team C was the "roll-back" team. Nitze was excluded from the project but Team C's mandate was taken almost verbatim from the prescriptive passages of NSC 68: diminish Soviet power – and Soviet-controlled territory – everywhere and by any means available. It stated: "The United States cannot continue to live with the Soviet threat. So long as the Soviet Union exists, it will not fall apart, but must and can be shaken apart." It concluded that "time has been working against us. This trend will continue unless it is arrested, and reversed by positive action." The rest of this section is deleted from the published version of the document. Marc Trachtenberg suggests that the deletion probably indicates that it is even more extreme than what was left in.

Team C included Navy Vice Admiral Richard L. Conolly, LTG L. L. Lemnitzer USA, Russia expert and future ambassador to Vietnam and Italy G. Frederick Reinhardt, Kilbourne Johnston, COL Andrew J. Goodpaster USA, Leslie S. Brady, COL Harold K. Johnson USA

=== Proposal for Team D ===
The President's top foreign policy advisors summarily rejected the recommendation that a fourth policy alternative be considered: Give Moscow an ultimatum to come to terms with Washington within two years or face the prospect of general war.

=== Operational security measures associated with Solarium ===
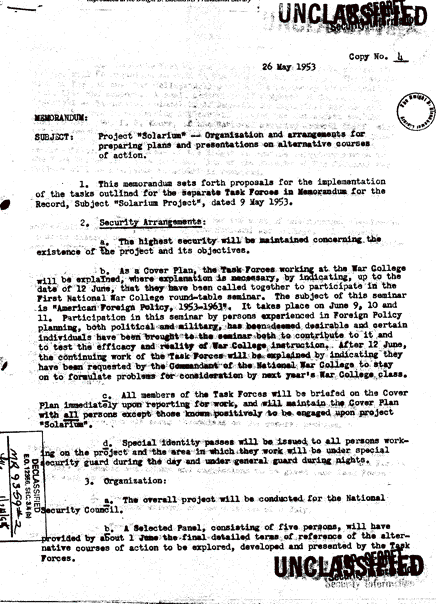
Solarium Documents

Given the sensitive nature of the exercise, significant measures were taken to obfuscate its true purpose. Though the exercise itself was conceived by Eisenhower at the White House, he chose to hold the exercise at the National War College under the rubric of the 'First National War College Round Table Seminar,' the subject of the seminar being 'American Foreign Policy, 1953 - 1961.' To add layers of backstopping to this cover story, the National War College produced conference agendas, booklets and pamphlets about the seminar to hand out to Solarium participants and National War College staff.

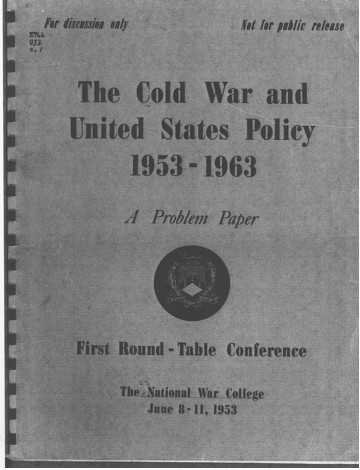
Solarium Cover Plan

Participants were held to strict standards of non-disclosure regarding their participation in Solarium leading up to its execution and following the presentation of the exercise findings to the National Security Council in June 1953. Even the existence of Solarium itself, the participants and the outcomes, were not declassified or officially acknowledged until 1985.

== Findings ==
The three panels submitted reports to the National Security Council after approximately 45 days of analysis and an additional 30 days of deliberation. Though each team presented a different case as was prescribed, President Eisenhower summarized the findings of the exercise in these general terms, which aligned generally with the findings of Team A:

1. The Soviet Union was a long term, rather than an imminent, threat, and one that would diminish if the United States acted prudently.

2. The threat was from Soviet troop strength, conventional weaponry, and a tendency to use intimidation and alliances to further its goals of creating a security zone in Eastern Europe and Asia, and of overthrowing independent governments. None of these was as important, however, as the increasing number of nuclear weapons in the possession of the Soviets and concomitantly their capacity to deliver them.

3. The United States needed to avoid both public alarm – which could bring excessive military preparations - and complacency – which might encourage the Soviet Union and its allies to take risks, as in Korea. The United States thus should maintain a system of alliances circumscribing the Soviet Bloc and military readiness, both conventional and nuclear.

4. The United States would pursue its national security in conjunction with its allies, and this pursuit would involve, not rollback of Soviet power, but a continuation of containment.

5. The most useful strategy for the United States, once it had established its deterrent capacity and resolve, would be political and educational – conveying the truth about capitalism, democracy and human rights by various means to the populations of Eastern Europe and the Soviet Union.

Eisenhower rejected Team C's extreme approach, commenting: "You can't have this kind of war. There just aren't enough bulldozers to scrape the bodies off the streets."

== Effect on U.S. national strategy ==
=== NSC 162/2 ===
The summary report from the Solarium exercise formed the basis for NSC 162/2, which in many ways solidified the policy of containment toward the Soviet Union. The text of NSC 162/2 can be seen to incorporate lines of thought from Kennan's camp, Paul Nitze and President Eisenhower's own beliefs in the prudent limitation of military spending in the interest of maintaining the long-term growth of the U.S. economy. The blending of these three lines of thought led to a document that prescribed a strategy that played to U.S. strengths, emphasized alliances with developed and developing nations, and supported constant partial military mobilization with a buildup of the U.S. nuclear arsenal to unprecedented levels, while continuing to place an overall priority on "Measures Short of War" as the primary means of containing Soviet aggressive behavior. NSC 162/2 underpinned the Eisenhower administration's "New Look" U.S. foreign policy, and ultimately guided US policy toward the Soviet Union for the bulk of the Cold War.

As an exercise in national strategy design, Solarium has yet to be repeated in any comprehensive fashion, although various presidential administrations have tried.

== See also ==
- The Hawk and the Dove (book)
- Present at the Creation: My Years in the State Department
- The Wise Men (book)
