= Massive retaliation =

Military doctrine focusing on using more force in retaliation to an attack

Nuclear tests Grable in 1953, the year massive retaliation became US policy, and Apple-2 in 1955

Massive retaliation is a military doctrine and nuclear strategy that commits a state to retaliate to an attack in much greater force, especially with the use of nuclear weapons.

During the early stages of the Cold War, the New Look national security policy of the Eisenhower administration dictated that the United States threaten "its atomic capability and massive retaliatory striking power" to deter aggression from the Soviet Union. This strategy was seen as a cheaper alternative to maintaining a large conventional military, and cutting costs was a high priority for Eisenhower.

Massive retaliation sparked controversy in a 1954 speech by John Foster Dulles implying that minor aggression could provoke the US into total nuclear war. While Eisenhower's foreign policy did frequently rely on the threat of nuclear retaliation, the phrase massive retaliation does not adequately describe his policies. Eisenhower deeply feared the prospect of nuclear war. He was resolute that even a limited nuclear war would invariably escalate to total nuclear war, with devastating global consequences. His objectives were to avoid that outcome, contain the threat of communism, and maintain a healthy domestic economy.

Nevertheless, a widespread perception emerged that Eisenhower's policies were inflexible and incredible in the face of a growing communist threat. John F. Kennedy capitalized on this perception in his presidential campaign by championing a new strategy, flexible response, that would develop the US's ability to fight limited wars.

== Background ==
After World War II, during the beginning of the Cold War, the Soviet Union grew in strength while Western Europe struggled to rebuild its economy and military. US President Harry S. Truman's overarching strategic goal was to contain or reverse the spread of totalitarian Soviet power. Towards this goal, the US implemented the Marshall Plan to help rebuild Europe, and joined the NATO alliance to protect it from Soviet aggression.

The US was the only country with atomic weapons, from their invention until 1949, when the Soviet Union detonated its first. The need to deter this new threat was recognized in NSC 68, a national security policy paper written for the Truman administration in April 1950: "Only if we had overwhelming atomic superiority and obtained command of the air might the USSR be deterred from employing its atomic weapons as we progressed toward the fulfillment of our objectives." The top secret paper predicted that, by 1954, the Soviet Union would have sufficient atomic stockpiles and delivery methods to launch a devastating surprise attack on the US and its allies.

== Strategy ==
Massive retaliation is essentially a preemptive nuclear first strike. In the event of imminent attack from the Soviet Union, NATO forces would rapidly respond with strategic and tactical nuclear bombing in an effort to destroy Soviet nuclear forces before they left the ground. This strategy was summarized in MC 48, a strategy paper adopted by NATO in 1954: "Should war occur, the best defense against atomic attack lies in the ability of the Allied nations to reduce the threat at source by immediate and intensive atomic counter-attack."

The aim of massive retaliation was to deter the Soviet Union from attacking Western Europe, which lacked enough conventional forces to counter the vast Soviet military. Deterrence requires that potential aggressors know what actions could invite retaliation, and they must believe that retaliation could cost them more than they stand to gain. They must also believe that if they avoid those actions, retaliation won't happen anyway. These are the same principles underlying mutual assured destruction. However, massive retaliation implies that even a minor conventional attack on a nuclear state could conceivably result in all-out nuclear retaliation.

A closely related concept is brinkmanship, the practice of risking the escalation of conflict in order to gain some advantage.

== History ==
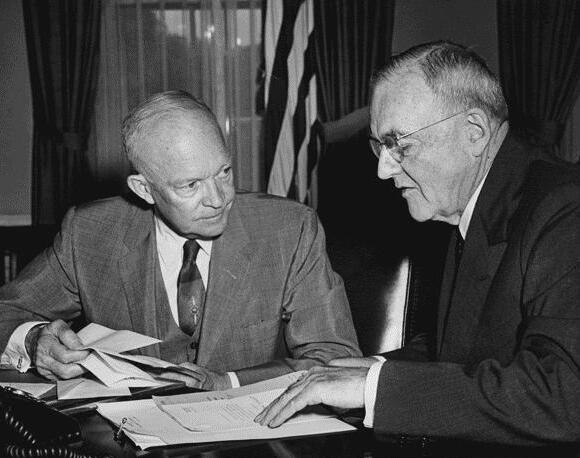
US President Eisenhower (left) meeting with Secretary of State Dulles at the White House in 1956

The concept of massive retaliation became US policy with the approval of NSC 162/2 in October 1953 by US President Dwight D. Eisenhower. This policy paper was synthesized from three reports written under Project Solarium. It stated that, in order to defend against Soviet aggression, the US required "a strong military posture, with emphasis on the capability of inflicting massive retaliatory damage by offensive striking power."

Massive retaliation was part of Eisenhower's broader New Look national security policy, which attempted to balance a healthy economy with military strength. Military expenditures could be greatly reduced by relying more on nuclear weapons as a substitute for conventional military strength.

The policy sparked public controversy in a speech by Eisenhower administration Secretary of State John Foster Dulles, on January 12, 1954:

We need allies and collective security. Our purpose is to make these relations more effective, less costly. This can be done by placing more reliance on deterrent power and less dependence on local defensive power. ... Local defense will always be important. But there is no local defense which alone will contain the mighty land power of the Communist world. Local defenses must be reinforced by the further deterrent of massive retaliatory power. A potential aggressor must know that he cannot always prescribe battle conditions that suit him.

Although Dulles did not explicitly use the words massive retaliation, his speech created the impression that any amount of Soviet aggression might provoke the US into total nuclear war. The speech aroused feelings of anger and skepticism from both the American public and its allies. However, no decision was made by the Eisenhower administration to rely exclusively on the threat of strategic nuclear bombing, as demonstrated by its flexible responses to various crises such as in Indochina, the Taiwan Strait, Suez, and Lebanon.

Eisenhower did not believe in "limited" nuclear war with the Soviet Union. He believed that any general war between the US and the Soviet Union would escalate to full-scale nuclear war. By 1955, both countries possessed hydrogen bombs vastly more destructive than earlier fission weapons. Eisenhower was very pessimistic about the potential results of nuclear war, having said in 1954, "Atomic war will destroy civilization. There will be millions of people dead. ... If the Kremlin and Washington ever lock up in a war, the results are too horrible to contemplate."

1958 deployment of tactical nuclear weapons in Korea

The New Look policy was applied in East Asia, where defense budgets could be reduced by withdrawing troops from Korea, and increasing reliance on nuclear weapons. Eisenhower planned and advocated for their tactical use on the Korean peninsula should the Korean Armistice Agreement (which ended fighting in the Korean War) have been broken and either China or North Korea invaded the south. While the 1950 Sino-Soviet Treaty afforded China some protection, it had not yet developed nuclear capability, so US military planners were less concerned about nuclear retaliation. Eisenhower advocated for tactical use against military targets, minimizing civilian casualties, but the Strategic Air Command, under General Curtis LeMay, planned for strategic strikes against Chinese cities. The US deployed tactical nuclear weapons in South Korea starting in January 1958.

Later the same year, during the Second Taiwan Strait Crisis, Eisenhower again relied on the threat of nuclear retaliation to deter China, under Mao Zedong, from attacking Taiwan. US armed forces were put on full alert, and a large naval force was deployed to the region. This was particularly risky, as the unpredictable Mao regime could have decided to attack anyway. Had this happened, the US would have been forced to make a difficult choice: either risk allowing Taiwan to fall and accept a serious blow to US credibility, or follow through on nuclear threats, killing potentially millions of civilians.

== Criticism ==
In 1960, RAND Corporation strategist Herman Kahn stressed the similarity between massive retaliation and a first strike. Many military planners at the time adhered to the idea of a "splendid first strike" where, if provoked by the Soviet Union, the US should launch a large nuclear strike at "a time and place of our choosing." Kahn argued that the threat of a first strike could not credibly deter minor forms of aggression, because of the high risk posed by retaliation for even a very successful nuclear first strike, plus unavoidably severe political and moral costs. Therefore, a first strike could only be either a preventive measure, or in response to major aggression.

RAND strategist Bernard Brodie, who outlined the foundation of nuclear deterrence theory that remains relevant in US policy today, wrote in 1959 that massive retaliation, similar to a preventive or preemptive first strike, is a seductive option to military planners owing to its potential to completely eliminate a threat. Because of the difficulty of defending against nuclear attack, it is assumed that whoever strikes first will have a major advantage: They could ostensibly wipe out their enemy's retaliatory forces. However, because of the inherent uncertainty of military planning, and the terrible damage should even one enemy hydrogen bomb slip through defenses, Brodie argued against most forms of first strike: it is likely not possible to outright win a nuclear war, and the costs of such an attempt are very high. Instead, Brodie strongly advocated for deterrence through secure second strike capability.

According to Brodie, threats of massive retaliation were simply not credible, and that in practice, military planners would always choose limited responses to less-than-total aggression; due to ambiguity about the precise threshold for massive retaliation, disagreement among armed services, and political forces urging restraint.

In areas such as Korea or Taiwan, where US adversaries did not yet possess nuclear weapons, Brodie argued that the use of nuclear weapons would be seen as abhorrent enough to alienate any allies protected in this manner.

== Policy shift ==
In 1957, three years after his announcement of massive retaliation, Dulles wrote in Foreign Affairs that there had been no alternative to massive retaliation at the time, but that it now seemed possible confine the effects of nuclear weapons to limited targets. According to Cold War historian Marc Trachtenberg, Dulles shifted toward what would later be called flexible response, having said in 1958: "...the United States must be in a position to fight defensive wars which do not involve the total defeat of the enemy."

Nevertheless, Eisenhower continued to dismiss the possibility of restraint in general war against the Soviet Union throughout his term. In 1959, he said: "...once we become involved in a nuclear exchange with the Soviet Union, we could not stop until we had finished off the enemy; that is, forced him to stop fighting."

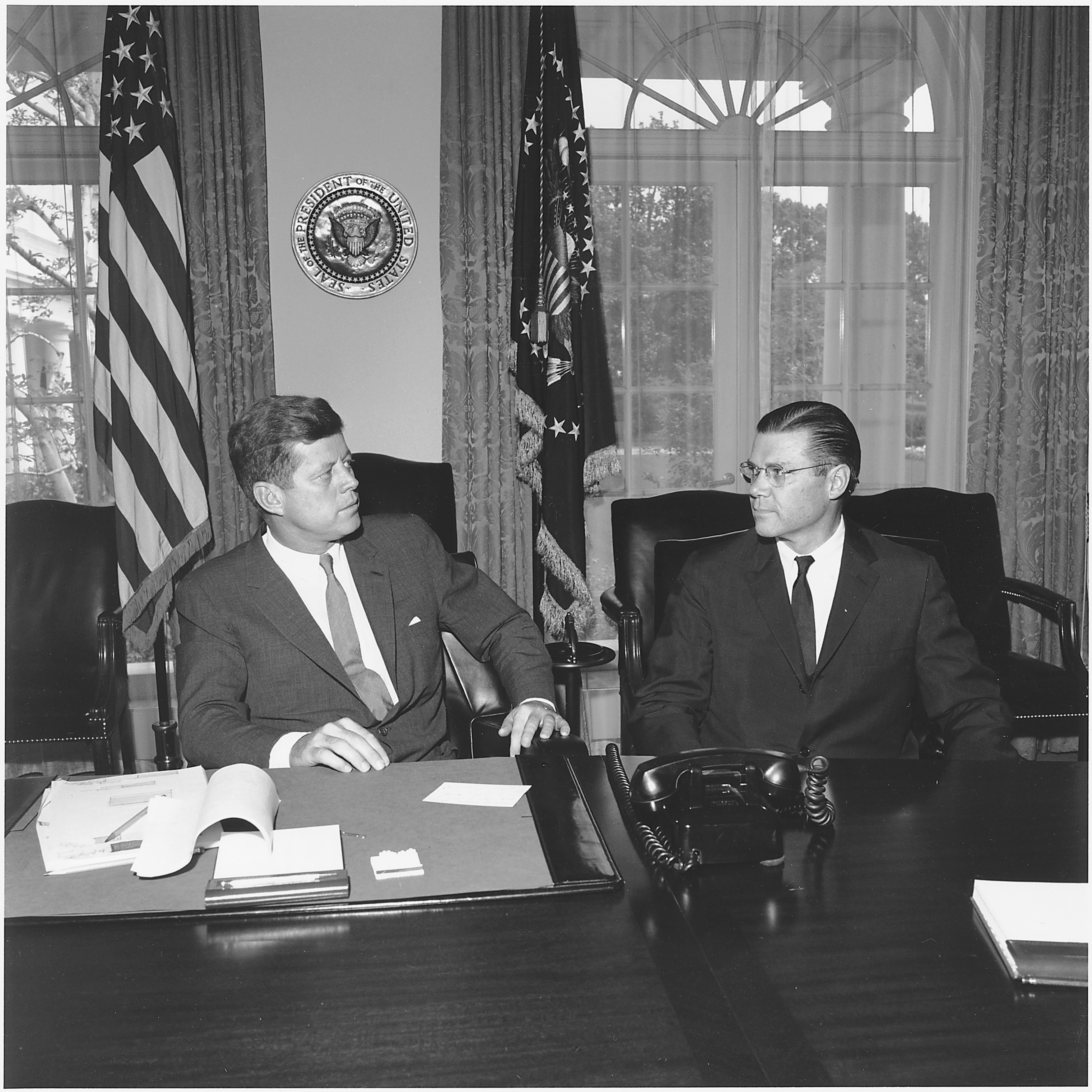
US President Kennedy (left) and Secretary of Defense Robert McNamara in 1962

By the time Eisenhower's second term as president ended, there was a widespread, false public perception that the US had fallen behind the Soviet Union in terms of military strength. This belief was spurred by the Soviet Union's successful test of the world's first ICBM in 1957, followed shortly by the launching of the world's first artificial satellite, Sputnik. The supposed military shortfall was termed the missile gap in 1958 by John F. Kennedy during his presidential campaign, which heavily criticized Eisenhower's strategic policies. Kennedy offered a new doctrine, flexible response, that would increase the defense budget, procure a greater variety of conventional military options, and respond to smaller threats more proportionately. Bolstered by support for this platform, Kennedy won the 1960 US presidential election, and assumed office in January the next year.

In Europe, Kennedy had to assuage fears from NATO allies, reassuring them that the change in doctrine did not reduce US commitment to their defense. Across the third world, Kennedy applied flexible response in the form of counterinsurgency against revolutionary guerilla forces, such as by deploying Green Berets to fight against the Viet Cong, but these efforts faced great difficulty.

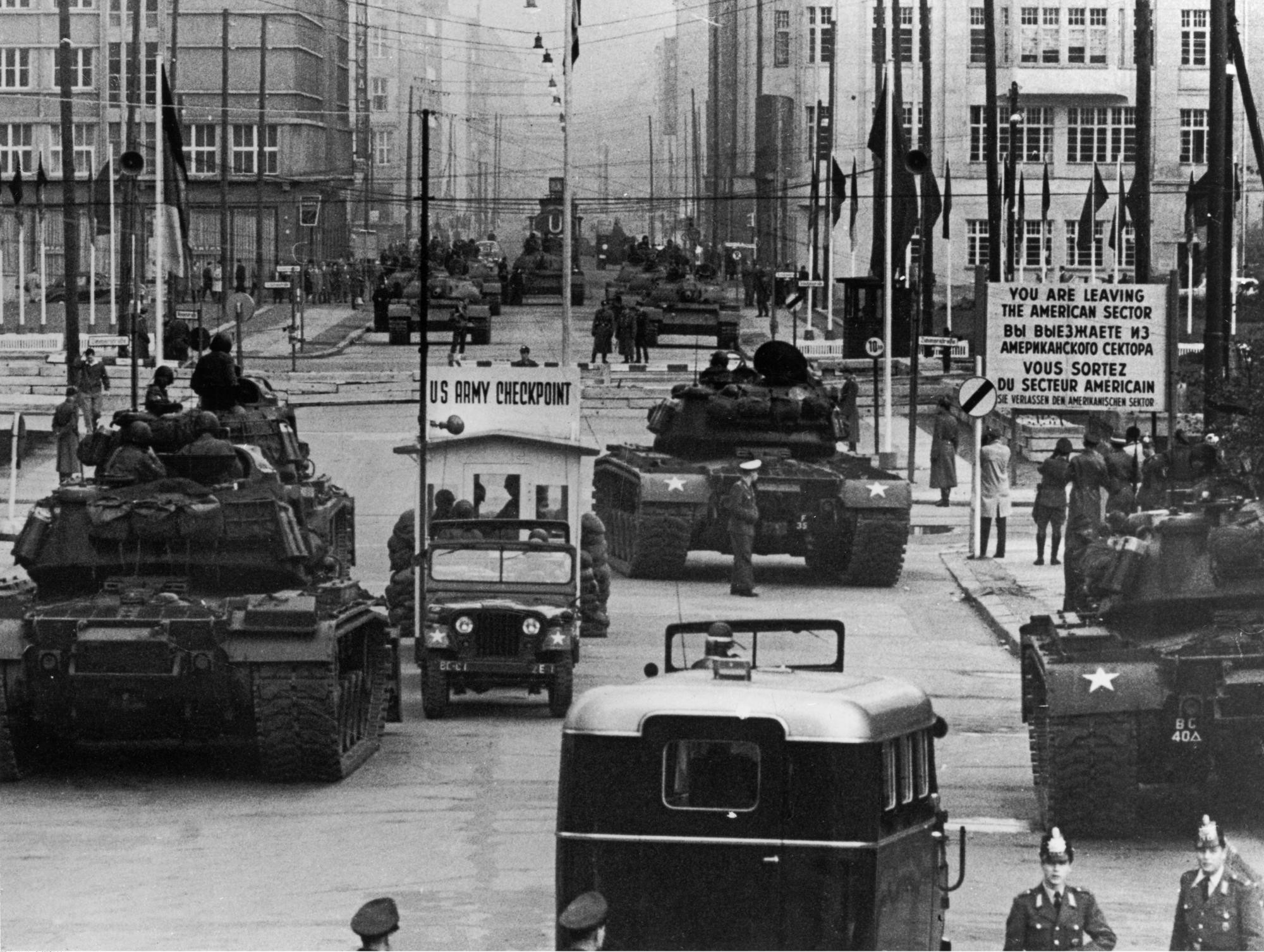
US and Soviet tanks face off in Berlin in 1961

In terms of nuclear strategy, the application of flexible response was similar to that of massive retaliation. In the Berlin Crisis of 1961, Kennedy realized that West Berlin could not be defended conventionally, and could not be sacrificed without severe loss of US credibility. He alluded to a full-scale nuclear threat:

We cannot and will not permit the Communists to drive us out of Berlin, either gradually or by force. ... In the thermonuclear age, any misjudgment on either side about the intentions of the other could rain more devastation in several hours than has been wrought in all the wars of human history.

However, a nuclear standoff did not occur, and tensions were lowered after talks between Kennedy and Nikita Khrushchev.

Kennedy's Secretary of Defense, Robert McNamara, who initially supported the threat of limited nuclear war as a deterrent, gradually came to the same conclusion Eisenhower had: Any nuclear conflict against the Soviet Union, no matter how limited it started, would end in total nuclear war. Especially after the Cuban Missile Crisis of October 1962, with the world having come the closest it ever has to nuclear holocaust, Kennedy's nuclear doctrine evolved toward mutual deterrence, also known as mutual assured destruction.

== Analysis ==
The phrase massive retaliation was mostly rhetorical, and did not accurately reflect the policies of the Eisenhower administration, which in practice, were more flexible and nuanced than implied. James Reston wrote in 1955 for The New York Times that the phrase obfuscated policy, comparing it to a slogan. According to Cold War historian Samuel F. Wells, the phrase was a form of political communication designed to impress upon the US public and its allies that a new, stronger stance against communism was being taken, one which exploited the efficiency and savings offered by atomic weapons. When Eisenhower was elected, there was strong political and public demand for such a stance. By the end of his presidency, public perceptions had shifted against Eisenhower, and Kennedy used a new catchphrase, flexible response, to label and distinguish his own policies. According to Wells, Kennedy's policies developed upon Eisenhower's rather than abandoning them. Wells also argued that massive retaliation was deliberately ambiguous, which can be useful in foreign policy.

== See also ==
- Deterrence theory
- Game theory
- Nuclear peace
- Peace through strength
- Proportionality (law)
- Samson Option
- Weapon of mass destruction
