= Brinkmanship =

Political and military tactic

- Strategic Crisis Escalation
- The practice of pushing a dangerous situation to the absolute limit.
- Paradigm: Geopolitics & IR Theory
- Historical Peak: Cold War era (1947–1991)
- Term Coined By: Adlai Stevenson II (1956)
- Core Objective: Force an opponent to blink or retreat by maximizing perceived risk
- Mathematical Model: Game theory (Chicken)
- Dynamic Mechanics
- Key Pillars: Credible threats; Calculated irrationality; Irreversible commitments
- Primary Drivers: Nuclear deterrence & MAD
- Case Studies & Risks
- Classic Examples: Cuban Missile Crisis (1962); Berlin Blockade (1948); Korean War negotiations (1953)
- Existential Failures: Miscalculation; Loss of control escalation; Total Nuclear warfare
- Theoretical Cousins
- Madman theory • Massive Retaliation • Deterrence theory

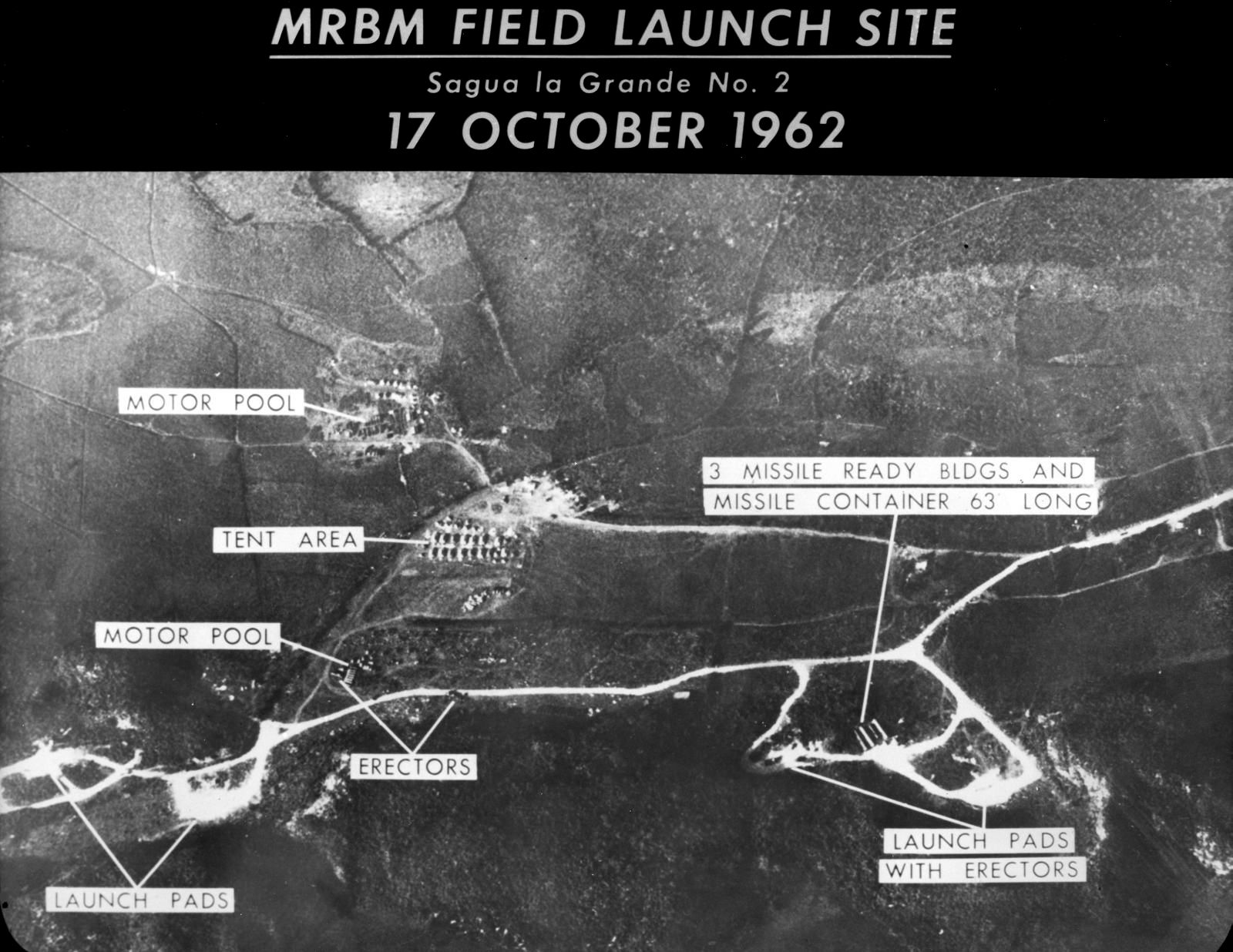
The handling of the Cuban Missile Crisis has been described as brinkmanship.

Brinkmanship or brinksmanship is the practice of trying to achieve an advantageous outcome by pushing dangerous events to the brink of active conflict. The maneuver of pushing a situation with the opponent to the brink succeeds by forcing the opponent to back down and make concessions rather than risk engaging in a conflict that would no longer be beneficial to either side. This might be achieved through diplomatic maneuvers, or by creating the impression that one is willing to use extreme methods rather than concede. The tactic occurs in international politics, foreign policy, labor relations, contemporary military strategy (by involving the threat of nuclear weapons), terrorism, and high-stakes litigation.

The term is chiefly associated with John Foster Dulles, US Secretary of State from 1953 to 1956 during the Eisenhower administration. Dulles sought to deter aggression from the Soviet Union by warning that the cost might be massive retaliation against Soviet targets. The British philosopher and mathematician Bertrand Russell compared it to the game of chicken.

== Origins ==
Brinkmanship is the ostensible escalation of threats to achieve one's aims. The word was probably coined, on the model of Stephen Potter's "gamesmanship", by the American politician Adlai Stevenson in his criticism of the philosophy described as "going to the brink" during an interview with US Secretary of State John Foster Dulles during the Eisenhower administration. In the article written in Life magazine by the correspondent James R. Shepley, Dulles defined his policy of brinkmanship in these terms: "The ability to get to the verge without getting into the war is the necessary art." During the Cold War, it was used as a policy by the United States to coerce the Soviet Union into backing down militarily. Eventually, the threats involved might become so huge as to be unmanageable, at which point, both sides are likely to back down. That was the case during the Cold War, since the escalation of threats of nuclear war, if carried out, were likely to lead to mutual assured destruction (MAD).

The pioneering game theorist Thomas Schelling defined brinkmanship as "manipulating the shared risk of war." The essence of such a crisis is that it leads neither side to be in full control of events, which creates a serious risk of miscalculation and escalation.

== Credible threats ==
For brinkmanship to be effective, both sides continuously escalate their threats and actions. However, a threat is ineffective unless it is credible, and, at some point, an aggressive party may have to prove its commitment to action.

The chance of things sliding out of control is often used in itself as a tool of brinkmanship, because it can provide credibility to an otherwise incredible threat. During the Cold War, the Cuban Missile Crisis was an example of opposing leaders, US President John F. Kennedy and Soviet Premier Nikita Khrushchev, continually issuing warnings with increasing force about impending nuclear exchanges without necessarily validating their statements. Thomas Schelling called that "the threat that leaves something to chance."

== Cold War ==
Brinkmanship was an effective tactic during the Cold War because neither side of the conflict could contemplate mutual assured destruction in a nuclear war. The nuclear deterrence of both sides threatened massive destruction on each other. Ultimately, brinkmanship worsened the relationship between the Soviets and the Americans.

=== Conceptualization ===
In the spectrum of the Cold War, the concept of brinkmanship involved the West and the Soviet Union using tactics of fear and intimidation as strategies to make the opposing side back down. Each faction pushed dangerous situations to the brink, with the intention of making the other back down in matters of international politics and foreign policy and obtaining concessions. Nevertheless, in the Cold War both parties were confronted with devastating consequences since the threats of nuclear war were unmanageable in any situation.

By escalating threats of nuclear war and massive retaliation, both parties had to respond with more force. The principle of the tactic was that neither party would prefer to yield to the other, but one of them would simply have to yield, or the outcome would be the worst possible for both of them.

The problem, however, was that yielding would result in being labelled as the weaker side. During the Cold War, both the Soviets and the Americans had a reputation to uphold to their populations and also to their neighboring countries and allies.

That made brinkmanship utterly risky since if neither country budged, the only way to avoid mutually assured destruction was to compromise. The British philosopher, mathematician, and intellectual Bertrand Russell compared it to the game of chicken:

Since the nuclear stalemate became apparent, the governments of East and West have adopted the policy which Mr. Dulles calls 'brinksmanship.' This is a policy adapted from a sport which, I am told, is practiced by some youthful degenerates. This sport is called 'Chicken!'.

==== Contextualization ====
The Soviet Union and the West spent nearly 50 years on the brink of war. During conflicts like the Cuban Missile Crisis, tensions escalated to the point that it seemed as if the Cold War would turn into an actual nuclear war. Brinkmanship was one of the last stages of those relations.

In a conflict between two nations that were so ideologically opposed, drastic policies such as brinkmanship seemed to be the only way to come to any sense of agreement. Both the Americans and the Soviets maintained strict policies not to respond immediately to military threats. However, by making the possibility of a war more and more likely, both nations were able to make significant progress in discussions and peace.

==== Eisenhower's "New Look" policy ====
US President Dwight D. Eisenhower's New Look Policy reverted to the older notion that the Soviet Union could be contained if Soviet Premier Nikita Khrushchev was still assumed to be aiming at further expanding Soviet influence. The tactic was supposed to isolate the Soviet Union so that communism would not spread but would collapse in on itself.

To enforce the tactic, the Americans made alliances with many countries that were considered to be vulnerable to the Soviets' sphere of influence. The Soviets were now known to have nuclear weapons and so both superpowers were on a more even playing field. To combat this problem, Eisenhower threatened to use all of the American arsenal if the Soviets took offensive measures.

That was a bold move as it established the stakes to be extremely high, as the action could cause massive destruction for both sides. The threat caused an increase and a buildup of tension, with neither side wanting to pull the trigger on the other for fear of the other's reaction.

==== Kennedy's flexible response ====
Flexible response was a defense strategy executed by US President John F. Kennedy in 1961. Its aim was to address skepticism that the Kennedy administration held towards Eisenhower's New Look: specifically its policy of massive retaliation. Flexible response required mutual deterrence at tactical, strategic, and conventional levels and bestowing upon the United States the ability to respond to aggression across the spectrum of symmetrical conventional warfare and nuclear warfare.

Flexible response required the continuous presence of substantial conventional forces. The forces were to serve both to deter and to fight limited wars. Kennedy hoped to deter all wars, regardless of their nature. Although Eisenhower and Dulles wanted to achieve goals similar to those of Kennedy, both were more concerned with cost. To avoid both escalation and humiliation, Kennedy highlighted the importance of adequate flexibility and disregarded cost. Prior to nuclear war, Kennedy wished to increase the range of available options. He also believed that the European allies should contribute more to their own defense. Fundamentally, the notion of flexible response was to "increase the ability to confine the response to non-nuclear weapons."

=== Practices and effects of Cold War ===
==== Korean War (1950–1953) ====
The Korean War was a military conflict between South and North Korea that started on June 25, 1950. Although armed hostilities ended with the Korean Armistice Agreement on July 27, 1953, the ceasefire was not a treaty under international law and so a technical state of war remains. The United States led the UN coalition supporting South Korea, while the Soviet Union and People's Republic of China supported North Korea. The Korean War was the first armed conflict and proxy war of the Cold War and escalated tensions between the West and the East. In September 1949, the Soviets tested their first atomic bomb, which made a limited war virtually impossible.

Fears of communism had risen after the Second Red Scare, led by Wisconsin US Senator Joseph McCarthy, indirectly calling for a policy to limit Communist Threat: NSC 68. In accordance with NSC 68, a report that stated that all communist activities were controlled by Soviet Premier Joseph Stalin, and it called for military and economic aid to any country deemed to be resisting Communist threats, the Americans sent troops to South Korea after it was invaded by the North on June 25, 1950. That contradicted the report, in that the United States was once again at war (the report stated that the United States should avoid war), but US President Harry S. Truman feared a domino effect and wanted to prevent the spread of communism:

If we let Korea down, the Soviets will keep right on going and swallow up one piece of Asia after another.... If we were to let Asia go, the Near East would collapse and no telling what would happen in Europe.... Korea is like the Greece of the Far East. If we are tough enough now, if we stand up to them like we did in Greece three years ago, they won't take any more steps.

The Soviets boycotted the UN Security Council because the Americans had refused the entry of the People's Republic of China into the United Nations. The UN, supported by the United States, freely passed a resolution requesting military action against North Korea. Led by General Douglas MacArthur, the UN Forces arrived along with the US Forces on July 1, 1950. Truman believed that the North Korean atomic threat was "a threat based on contingency planning to use the bomb, rather than the faux pas so many assume it to be" and so did not use brinkmanship but also continuously opted for limited war. His beliefs in ceasefire and peacekeeping between the North and the South were cause for great conflict with MacArthur, who sought total war. MacArthur believed that the United States should take the opportunity to wipe out communism permanently before it grew stronger by using all of its weapons such as turning the war into nuclear war. MacArthur was dismissed as a result of his continuous defiance to Truman and other superiors on April 11, 1951, after he sent an ultimatum to the Chinese Army without consent of Truman.

As the historian Bruce Cumings noted, the Korean War heightened the Cold War and brought both nations closer to a nuclear war. The United States wanted to ensure that the United Nations would succeed, unlike the League of Nations, and wanted to show off its power to the world and to exhibit that it could still tame the communist threat, which was now also present in Asia. Similarly, the Soviet Union wanted to demonstrate its newly built military strength to the United States.

==== Berlin Crisis ====
Between 1950 and 1961, "the refugee flow continued at a rate of 100,000 to 200,000 annually" with people moving from the East to the West. The economic conditions were better in West Berlin than in East Berlin and so attracted more young workers.

Trying to find a way to stop the people from moving, East German President Walter Ulbricht pressured the Soviet Union to help with Berlin and emigration. Khrushchev wanted the Western Allies to leave Berlin or sign a separate peace treaty with East Germany. He feared that West Germany would economically and politically overwhelm East Germany and in turn undermine the Warsaw Pact, which the Soviet Union dominated.

On November 10, 1958, Khrushchev delivered a speech in which he demanded that the Western Powers pulled out of Western Berlin within six months. Furthermore, Khrushchev declared that East Germany was to take control of all communication lines and so West Berlin would be accessible only with East German permission. Interpreting Khrushchev's speech as an ultimatum, the United States, France, and the United Kingdom declined and said that they would remain in West Berlin.

In 1959, the Big Four powers held a conference in Geneva in which the foreign ministers attempted to negotiate an agreement on Berlin. However, the conference did not do much other than open up talks between the Soviet Union and United States. The Soviets wanted Western powers out of West Berlin in an attempt to reunify Berlin. The United States refused to give up West Berlin. In 1961, Khrushchev met with Kennedy and they continued to solve the issue on Berlin. Again, Khrushchev sent an ultimatum to the United States, asking them to leave West Berlin. As a result, Kennedy increased military and defense expenditures.

On August 13, 1961, Ulbricht had ordered barbed wire between East and West Berlin. The barbed wire was later changed to cement walls. This prevented the movement between the two sides. The division between the two Berlins was known as the Berlin Wall. The United States heavily condemned the Berlin Wall and responded by placing troops on the West German side. The actions were followed by Soviet Union, which placed its troops and tanks on the East German side. That led to the iconic image of tanks facing each other at "Checkpoint Charlie," which symbolized the division of the eastern and the western parts of Germany.

Any action taken by either side's had the possibility of resulting in a nuclear war between the Soviets and the Americans. As a result, in the summer of 1961, Kennedy met with Khrushchev in Vienna to try to find a solution for the problem of Berlin. Kennedy suggested Khrushchev to remove the Soviet troops, and the American troops would then be removed. However, no solution was found since neither side was ready to make concessions. The conference ended with Khrushchev issuing another ultimatum to the United States that gave six months to get out of Berlin. As a result, Kennedy refused to back down and instead prepared for military action, which led to further military escalation by Khrushchev.

==== Cuban Missile Crisis ====
A prime example of brinkmanship during the Cold War was the Cuban Missile Crisis (1962), a 13-day conflict between the United States, the Soviet Union, and Cuba. Both superpowers were armed with nuclear weapons and practiced brinkmanship during the conflict. The Cuban Missile Crisis was not only the closest that the Americans and the Soviets came to an armed conflict but also the "closest the world has come to [a full-scale] nuclear war."

The crisis was caused by the placement of Soviet nuclear weapons in Cuba, an island that was within the US sphere of influence and launching distance. That was arguably an act of brinkmanship by the Soviets to intimidate the US with weapons within the region. The US responded to the presence of the weapons by blockading Cuba. The Cuban blockade was also an act of brinkmanship since the Americans, instead of succumbing to the pressure from the Soviets, decided to see how the Soviets would react to the Americans stopping their vessels from entering Cuba.

=== Arms race ===
The US was building up its missiles, with President Eisenhower issuing the National Defense Education Act in 1958, an attempt to close the missile gap with the Soviets. It gave funds to US. schools to start researching more so that the US military could catch up with the Soviet's technology. Eisenhower also started NASA from NACA, several research laboratories, and parts of the Army Ballistic Missile Agency: see Creation of NASA.

=== Aftermath of Cuban Missile Crisis ===
==== Détente ====
The détente was essentially a stilling of the waters between the Americans and the Soviets. It was started by US President Richard Nixon and his National Security Advisor, Henry Kissinger. It continued until 1980 and the start of the second phase of the Cold War. It focused on a philosophical deepening of American foreign policy to adjust to the changing international order, as opposed to the Kennedy and Johnson administrations, which had been too single-minded in their pursuit of victory in Vietnam. That move away from focusing solely on military buildup heralded 12 years in which the world experienced a kind of peace by the decreased tensions between the Americans and the Soviets.

==== Ronald Reagan and end of the Cold War ====
Ronald Reagan was inaugurated as US president on January 20, 1981. His idea of nuclear relations was, from the outset, very different from détente's goal of stability. He effectively ended the previously-accepted agreement of mutually assured destruction by almost immediately increasing the pace of the buildup of American arms to an unprecedented rate. Besides the buildup of conventional arms, military technology was improved. With the introduction of the stealth bomber and neutron bomb, the US again began to pull away from the Soviet Union. The most pivotal of them was the Strategic Defense Initiative - later called 'Star Wars' because of its improbability - which simultaneously brought the Americans to the brink of war against the Soviets, as the SDI nullified the idea of MAD, and also induced arms talks between Reagan and Mikhail Gorbachev, Soviet leader.

== North Korean nuclear crisis ==
The 2017–2018 North Korean nuclear crisis has been described as a representation of brinkmanship between US President Donald Trump and the North Korean leader Kim Jong-Un. The nuclear crisis was followed by a peace process, which saw mixed results. In 2017, between North Korea and the United States, tensions rose because of North Korea conducting nuclear and missile tests, and in response, the United States chose to sanction the country economically and a firm military warning. Also, this raised concerns among other countries, like Japan, China, and South Korea, given that tensions in the region increased. North Korea has also tested ICBM (Intercontinental Ballistic Missiles), where they claimed it could reach the United States.

This crisis is seen as an example of brinkmanship, because both countries project power and make threats without engaging militarily. Examples of this included warnings from both sides, projecting force, and uses military rhetoric, which caused international concern and raising the risk of a possible future war. The United States also increased its military presence in South Korea as a way to project might.

In 2018, there was the start of diplomatic efforts, which includes the meeting between North Korea's leader Kim Jong Un and the U.S. President Donald Trump, which reduced tensions temporarily. However, when talking about the long-term limits, they remained limited, given North Korea, despite the negotiations, chose to continue on developing its nuclear weapons. In the first meeting between Trump and Kim Jong Un in 2018, it took place in Singapore. In 2019, a second meeting between Trump and Kim took place in Hanoi, Vietnam, where it ended without a formal agreement, which shows the challenges of resolving the crisis with only diplomacy. As a result, at times, tensions continued to persist, which shows that the crisis still remains unresolved.

== See also ==
- Balance of terror
- Game theory
- Gamesmanship
- International crisis
- Madman theory
- Procrastination
- Chicken (game)
