= NATO Strategic Concept =

The NATO Strategic Concept is the document that sets out the strategy of the North Atlantic Treaty Organization. It provides the political and military background for the alliance's strategy and gives guidance to its military authorities on how to implement it. It is second in importance only to the North Atlantic Treaty, NATO's founding treaty.

Strategic concepts are agreed by consensus among the allies. They have reflected changes in NATO's security environment, from the Cold War doctrines of massive retaliation and flexible response to a broader approach involving crisis management and cooperation with countries outside the alliance. Originally classified, the concept became a public document in 1991. The most recent concept was adopted at the Madrid summit on 29 June 2022. It identifies Russia as the principal threat to allied security and sets out three core tasks: deterrence and defence, crisis prevention and management, and cooperative security.

== Purpose and preparation ==
The North Atlantic Treaty identifies neither an enemy nor a specific threat. It does not spell out in detail how its objectives should be implemented. It specifies no military strategy and requires no particular military organisation beyond the bodies established under Article 9, including the North Atlantic Council. This leaves the allies considerable latitude to change NATO's strategy and structures. The Strategic Concept supplies a framework for this work. As US defence planning adviser Chris D. Miller explained in 1998, the treaty sets out why the alliance exists, while the concept sets out what it is, where it is going and, in general terms, how it will get there.

Drafting requires agreement on the wording as well as the policy. In the preparations for the 1999 concept, allied officials worked through the document word by word, sentence by sentence and page by page. Miller described one meeting lasting three and a half hours that dealt mainly with a single sentence on NATO enlargement. During the Cold War, military authorities led the drafting, subject to political approval. Political leaders have taken the lead since the end of the Cold War, with military advice. Recent concepts have been approved by heads of state and government meeting in the North Atlantic Council. The public concepts were accompanied by classified military documents.

== History ==
=== Cold War ===
NATO issued four classified strategic concepts during the Cold War. The first document's initials referred to the Defence Committee; the later documents bore the initials of the Military Committee.

==== DC 6/1 ====
Before supplying military equipment, the United States required NATO to agree a strategy for dealing with the Soviet threat. The North Atlantic Council approved the first concept, DC 6/1, on 6 January 1950. It emphasised the deterrent effect of collective defence and relied on US nuclear capabilities. The concept acknowledged that Soviet forces outnumbered those of the alliance. Strategic bombing was primarily a US responsibility. European members were initially to provide the core of the ground forces and most tactical air support and air defence.

==== MC 3/5 ====
A second concept, MC 3/5 (Final), followed on 3 December 1952, taking account of NATO's new military command structure and the admission of Greece and Turkey. It retained the basic principles of DC 6/1. NATO also sought to place its defences as far east in Europe as possible. This raised the question of West Germany's part in allied defence, which remained unresolved until it joined NATO in 1955.

==== MC 14/2 ====
Achieving the targets agreed at NATO's Lisbon meeting in February 1952 turned out to be too costly and politically difficult. The New Look policy of the United States leaned onto nuclear weapons as a way to strengthen defence without increasing expenditure.

In the mid-1950s, the United States threatened massive nuclear retaliation against the Soviet Union should it attack a NATO country. US forces and nuclear weapons were deployed in Europe, mainly in Germany, so that a Soviet attack would engage US forces at an early stage.

This shift was reflected in MC 48, The Most Effective Pattern of NATO Military Strength for the Next Few Years, adopted by the North Atlantic Council on 17 December 1954. The document's answer to inadequate European air defences was to destroy Soviet nuclear delivery systems "at source", before they could attack NATO.

Francis J. Gavin, a historian, states that NATO's strategy called for nuclear attacks on Soviet nuclear forces early in a war. The goal of these counterforce strikes was to limit the Soviet Union's retaliation. NATO might even strike before Soviet troops opened fire if an invasion seemed imminent. Gavin notes that this posture of the forces could appear to the Soviet Union as preparations for a first strike.

The 1955 exercise programme tested air-defence problems identified in MC 48. NATO held the air exercise Carte Blanche in June that year. Robert T. Davis II concludes that its demonstration of NATO's weaknesses helped improve air defences, but publicity about predicted civilian losses undermined public confidence in nuclear deterrence.

NATO's third Strategic Concept, MC 14/2, was issued on 23 May 1957. It incorporated the nuclear strategy developed in MC 48. Under the 1957 concept, NATO planned to use nuclear weapons at the outset of a general war, even if the Soviet Union had not used them first.

==== MC 14/3 ====
The Soviet acquisition of long-range nuclear weapons undermined the credibility of massive retaliation. European governments questioned whether the United States would risk the destruction of its own cities to defend them. US defence secretary Robert McNamara favoured meeting an attack with a gradual escalation of force. Washington sought a higher threshold for nuclear use and stronger European conventional forces.

NATO adopted flexible response in its fourth concept, MC 14/3, approved by the Defence Planning Committee on 12 December 1967 and issued in its final form on 16 January 1968. It provided for direct defence against an attack, deliberate escalation and a general nuclear response. The strategy allowed for battlefield nuclear weapons to be used in a European conflict. The Harmel Report of 1967 gave the alliance the parallel tasks of promoting détente, or an easing of tensions, and sustaining deterrence and defence.

Direct defence meant meeting an attack at the level at which it began. If that failed, NATO could widen or intensify the conflict through deliberate escalation. A general nuclear response remained the ultimate option. Nuclear weapons could also be used during direct defence or escalation, subject to authorisation.

=== 1991 concept ===
The fifth concept was adopted at the Rome summit on 8 November 1991.

The 1991 Strategic Concept was the first to be released to the public. Its broad approach to security involved dialogue, cooperation and collective defence. With the Soviet threat receding, the allies decided that the defence cooperation developed during the Cold War could be turned to other purposes. NATO's subsequent military activities increasingly concerned operations outside the collective defence commitment in Article 5 of the treaty, particularly in Bosnia.

The military guidelines reduced reliance on nuclear weapons and moved, where appropriate, from forward defence towards a smaller forward presence. NATO would retain nuclear forces in Europe to preserve deterrence, while reducing its shorter-range nuclear arsenal.

Defence cooperation also served political goals. Through the Partnership for Peace, partner countries learned to work with NATO forces and develop democratically controlled defence establishments. Joint planning, exercises and day-to-day military cooperation helped the allies build political consensus and create military options for dealing with crises. Such cooperation did not guarantee a response to any particular crisis: NATO remained an organisation of sovereign states, and no member could be compelled to join an operation it did not support.

=== 1999 concept ===
In July 1997, allied leaders directed NATO authorities to examine the concept in the light of Europe's changed security situation. Preparations for a revision took account of NATO enlargement, new partnerships, relations with Russia and Ukraine, and the experience of military operations outside allied territory. The new concept was adopted at the Washington summit in April 1999.

The 1999 concept articulated a broader definition of security. It identified threats including terrorism, ethnic conflict, human rights abuses, political instability, and the spread of nuclear, biological and chemical weapons. The wars in the Balkans had spurred debate about operations outside NATO territory, and the United States and other allies argued that NATO should be prepared to confront threats beyond its borders.

Alongside collective defence, the concept listed crisis management and partnership among NATO's fundamental security tasks. Crisis response operations were to be agreed case by case and by consensus. The document also reaffirmed the alliance's commitment to democracy, human rights and the rule of law.

By 2009, critics argued that the 1999 concept did not adequately reflect events since the September 11 attacks. They argued that it did not devote sufficient attention to terrorism or incorporate the nature and reach of NATO missions, particularly in Afghanistan. Its broad guidelines permitted competing interpretations of NATO's possible mandates and responsibilities. Some members believed that NATO's future relevance depended on its capacity to conduct operations outside allied territory. Others believed it should focus on territorial and collective defence. Members also disagreed over continued enlargement and formal partnerships with like-minded countries, and over whether to expand NATO's capabilities for crisis management, stabilisation and reconstruction or focus more exclusively on military power.

The Strasbourg–Kehl summit launched work on a replacement. Supporters argued that a new concept could give NATO a clearer sense of purpose. Others expected another broad compromise because every ally had to agree. Some proponents argued that, regardless of the end result, the process could serve to renew strategic consensus among the member states of the alliance. Critics countered that the process might also open up dangerous and divisive debates that could distract the alliance from its ongoing operations.

=== 2010 concept ===
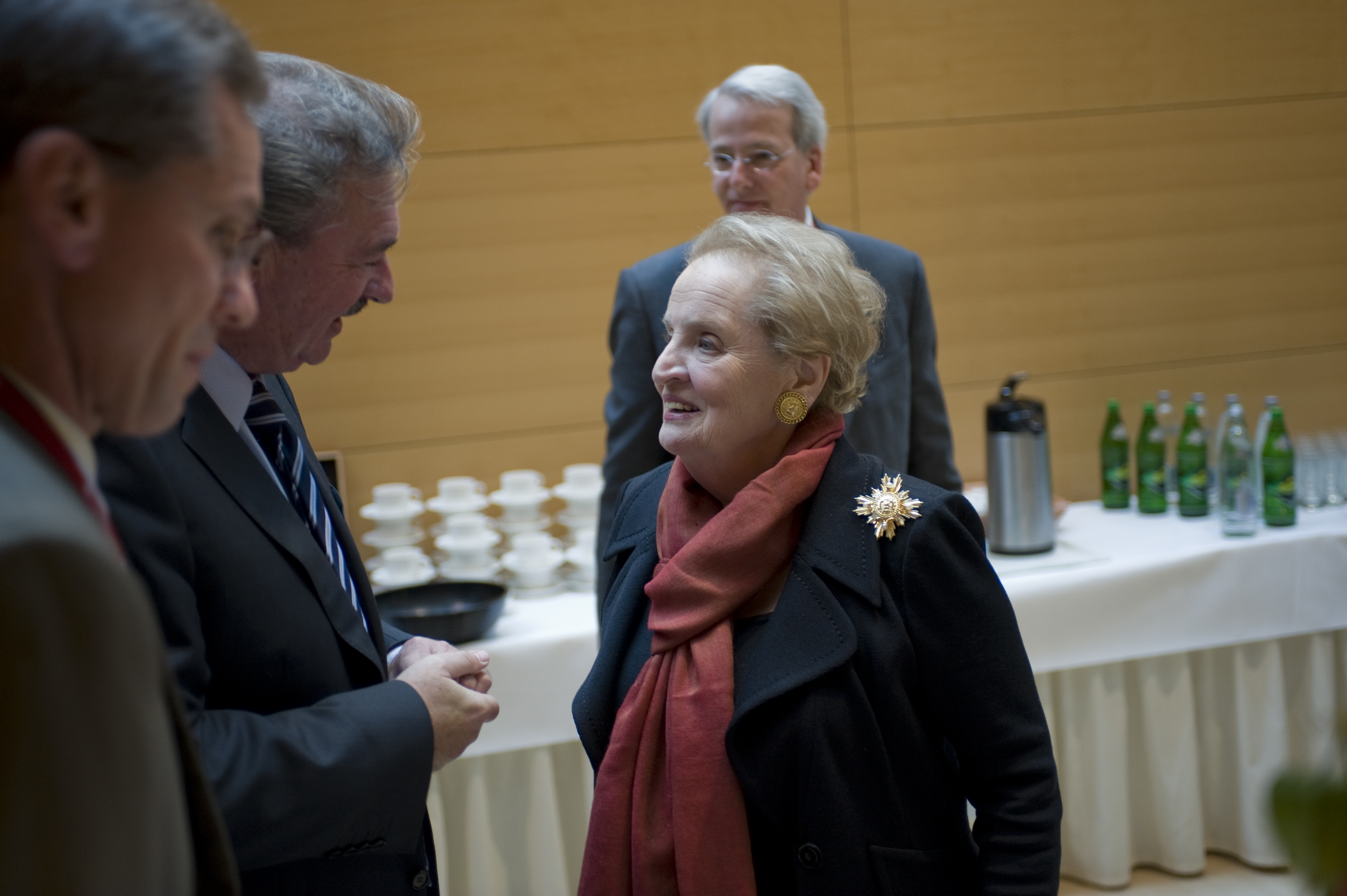
Madeleine Albright and Jean Asselborn (left) at a Strategic Concept seminar in Luxembourg on 16 October 2009

Work on the 2010 concept was led by Secretary General Anders Fogh Rasmussen. An expert group drawn from twelve allied countries, chaired by Madeleine Albright, prepared recommendations to assist him in drafting the document. The group began work in September 2009 and held seminars and consultations with civilian and military officials, scholars and representatives of partner countries. Its final report, NATO 2020: Assured Security; Dynamic Engagement, was presented on 17 May 2010.

Allied leaders adopted the next concept at the Lisbon summit on 19 November 2010. It was titled Active Engagement, Modern Defence. It articulated three broad tasks: collective defence, crisis management and cooperative security. The concept retained the Article 5 commitment to defend NATO members against attack and drew on the alliance's experience in the Balkans and Afghanistan.

The allies agreed to develop a missile defence capability to protect NATO's European populations, territory and forces, and invited Russia to cooperate. They also undertook to improve crisis management and cooperation with international and nongovernmental organisations. The concept called for a modest civilian crisis management capability to work with military forces when needed.

Cyber defence received greater attention. Attacks on military networks and civilian infrastructure could damage businesses, transport and supply networks as well as military operations. The concept also called for a leaner and more affordable command structure and the consolidation of NATO agencies.

=== 2022 concept ===
Preparations for the 2022 concept took place amid Russia's full-scale invasion of Ukraine. In a report published before the Madrid summit, Congressional Research Service analyst Paul Belkin expected a marked change in NATO's treatment of Russia and China. He identified resilience, cyber defence, hybrid threats and climate change as other likely areas of emphasis.

The concept adopted on 29 June identified Russia as the principal threat to allied security. It retained three core tasks, now expressed as deterrence and defence, crisis prevention and management, and cooperative security. It addressed China's policies as a challenge to NATO's interests and security, while keeping open the possibility of engagement. It also linked resilience, technological innovation, climate change and human security to the alliance's tasks.

By 2024, NATO was implementing new regional defence plans and corresponding force requirements. The plans specified each ally's expected contribution to defence and deterrence. Implementing the plans meant securing the force commitments, command and control arrangements, and support they required. NATO leaders noted that this would require increased defence investment. Since the February 2022 invasion, NATO had doubled the number of battalion-sized multinational battlegroups along its eastern flank. Each had between 1,000 and 2,000 soldiers. It deployed battlegroups in Bulgaria, Hungary, Romania and Slovakia. These joined the four groups deployed in Estonia, Latvia, Lithuania and Poland in 2017. Allies had pre-positioned equipment, including heavy weaponry, and established new command and control capabilities to enable rapid reinforcement when necessary.
