= Panthers over Korea =

Non-fiction account of events in the Korean War

Panthers Over Korea is an account of George Schnitzer's experiences as a United States Navy pilot during the Korean War flying the Grumman F9F Panther Jet aircraft. Veterans Legacy Memorial

What we did as part of the war was soon forgotten by the nation in general and the war earned the title: The Forgotten War. To those of us who went through the hail of enemy AAA fire, it was never forgotten. Eight of us started on this adventure; six of us came home alive after flying an average of 150 missions.

== Plot summary ==
The book starts with George Schnitzer's training on the Grumman F9F jet before deployment aboard the USS Antietam Carrier Air Group 15.The grind of combat flying becomes quickly apparent as they attack North Korean Communism supply lines. The North Korean gunners try to destroy the U.S. Navy Ground-attack aircraft with Anti-aircraft warfare installations. For the U.S. pilots, it is not only the North Korean bullets that they face, but also the difficulty of operating jets off the World War II aircraft carrier. The flights alternate between boring and suddenly frightening as the North Korean Tracer ammunition bullets chase them.

== The F9F Jet Fighter ==
The Grumman F9F Panther was the manufacturer's first jet fighter and the U.S. Navy's second. The Panther was the most widely used U.S. Navy jet fighter of the Korean War. It flew 78,000 sorties and was responsible for the first air kill by the US Navy in the war downing a North Korean Yakovlev Yak-9 fighter.

The Panther played a prominent role in the 1954 movie Men of the Fighting Lady (also known as Panther Squadron). The Panther was also featured in the flying sequences in the 1955 movie The Bridges at Toko-Ri.

== The Korean War ==
After failing to strengthen their cause in the elections held in South Korea during May 1950 and the refusal of South Korea to hold new elections per North Korean demands, the communist North Korean Army assaulted the South on June 25, 1950. The conflict was then expanded by the United States and the Soviet Union's involvement as part of the larger Cold War.

The Korean War was the first armed confrontation of the Cold War. It created the idea of a limited war, where two superpowers would fight in another country, forcing the people in that country to suffer the bulk of the destruction and death involved in a war between such large countries.

== Notes ==
This George Schnitzer is related to George Schnitzer Radio Officer who died as a result of the USS Shenandoah (ZR-1) crash. George Schnitzer Grave Information
