= Flexible response =

Military strategy of the Kennedy administration

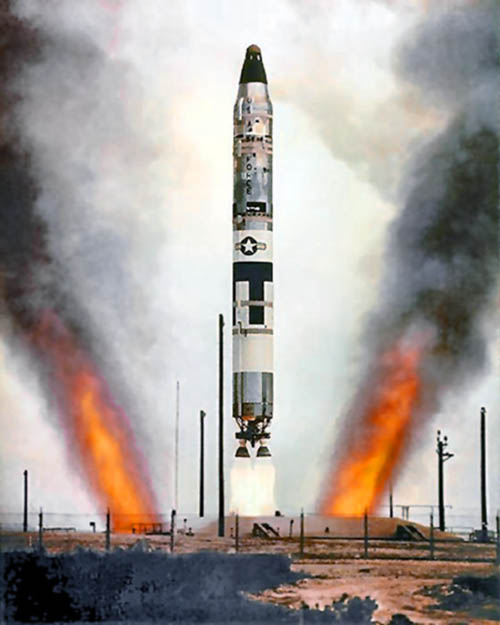
Flexible response represented a capability to fight across all spectrums of warfare, not just with nuclear arms such as this Titan II missile.

Flexible response was a defense strategy advocated by John F. Kennedy and implemented by his Secretary of Defense Robert McNamara in 1961 to address the Kennedy administration's skepticism of Dwight Eisenhower's New Look and its policy of massive retaliation. Flexible response calls for mutual deterrence at strategic, tactical, and conventional levels, giving the United States the capability to respond to aggression across the spectrum of war, not limited only to nuclear arms.

== History ==
The New Look policy, though initially useful, quickly became obsolete with the introduction of inter-continental delivery systems that undermined the credibility of a deterrence threat. The cornerstone of U.S. and European defense strategy was then threatened as the U.S. could no longer rely on nuclear threats to provide security for it and its allies.

During his presidential campaign, John F. Kennedy claimed that the Republican Party had allowed the U.S. to fall behind the Soviets into a missile gap. Upon entering office Kennedy cited General Maxwell Taylor's book The Uncertain Trumpet to Congress for its conclusion that massive retaliation left the U.S. with only two choices: defeat on the ground or the resort to the use of nuclear weapons. Technology had improved since massive retaliation was adopted. Improvements in communication and transportation meant U.S. forces could be deployed more effectively, quickly, and flexibly than before. Advisers persuaded Kennedy that having multiple options would allow the president to apply the appropriate amount of force at the right place without risking escalation or losing alternatives. This would improve credibility for deterrence as the U.S. would now have low-intensity options and therefore would be more likely to use them, rather than massive retaliation's all-or-nothing options.

Flexible Response was implemented to develop several options across the spectrum of warfare, other than the nuclear option, for quickly dealing with enemy aggression. In addition, the survivability of the retaliatory capability was stressed, leading to the diversification of the strategic force, development of the strategic triad, and half the Strategic Air Command force being put on permanent alert status.

== Nuclear responses ==
=== Stages ===
A staged plan was devised to counter any Soviet military action other than a first strike. On 7 October 1966 an informal session of the NATO Military Committee called for the flexibility of choice to meet varying contingencies. The new NATO Strategic Concept, MC 14/3, approved at the end of 1967, envisaged three types of military responses to aggression against NATO:

Direct defense: In case of a conventional Soviet attack (meaning non-nuclear therefore not considered a first strike) initial efforts would be to try to stop the Soviet advance with conventional weapons. That meant to try to force the foreseen Soviet attack on West Germany to a halt by NATO's European forces, Allied Command Europe.

Deliberate Escalation: If conventional NATO forces were succumbing under the Soviet attack, that was actually expected as intelligence that indicated that Soviet divisions greatly outnumbered NATO divisions. Then a series of possible steps "to defeat aggression by raising but where possible controlling, the scope and intensity of combat" with the "threat of nuclear response" would be taken. Among the examples provided were "broadening or intensifying a non-nuclear engagement, possibly by opening another front or initiating action at sea in response to low-intensity aggression", "demonstrative use of nuclear weapons", and "selective nuclear strikes on interdiction targets". In this phase, NATO forces could switch to a limited use of nuclear weapons, such as recently-developed tactical nuclear weapons (like nuclear artillery).

General Nuclear Response: The last phase or stage more or less corresponded to the mutual assured destruction scenario. The total nuclear attack on the communist world likely resulting in a Soviet response in kind if it had not already done so.

=== Development of the strategic triad ===
By 1960, the United States had three means of strategic forces: ICBMs, SLBMs, and strategic bombers. This triad made it possible for the United States to impose unacceptable damage to the Soviet Union with one strategic force independent of the other two forces. These different forces had their advantages and disadvantages:

- Bombers could deliver large payloads and strike with great accuracy, but were slow, vulnerable while on the ground, and could be shot down (though the development of various stand-off missiles reduced the risk of a shoot-down); they had the advantage of preservation via quick movement away from their bases during a crisis.
- ICBMs were safe in their underground silos while on the ground (that is, until the accuracy of their opposing missiles improved), but were in the early 1960s less accurate than bombers and could not be called back when launched.
- Submarines were in the early 1960s the least vulnerable (that is, as long as new anti-submarine technologies were not invented) but were also the least accurate and communication could be poor at times.

Each of these force structures provided the United States with different options to tailor their response to the situation. The flexible response doctrine would preserve the strategic triad, despite pressures to cut costs.

=== Assured destruction ===
The strategic doctrine for Kennedy's Flexible response was Assured Destruction. Flexible response made second strike capability its guiding principle of deterrence. In the event of Soviet nuclear aggression, the Soviets would know that enough U.S. nuclear capability would survive their strike to destroy their cities and industry. Robert McNamara argued for the definition of what was "unacceptable" to the enemy as the destruction of 50% of industry and 25% of the population. Deterrence depended on influence to show that violence and aggression did not pay, and being explicit about the level of destruction the US was willing to inflict on the enemy was one way to illustrate this point. Assured Destruction relied on deterrence by punishment, precision, and credibility.

=== No-cities doctrine ===
Defense Secretary McNamara sought to limit damage to the U.S. by developing a separate strategy for offense and defense. The offensive strategy was one of Counterforce, seeking to destroy Soviet military installations and hardware and thus disable this hardware before it could be used. In a 1962 speech to the University of Michigan, Ann Arbor, McNamara announced that the U.S. would refrain from striking countervalue targets (cities) early in nuclear war, reserving such force later in war should the Soviets not show similar restraint. This would not only induce the Soviets to spare American cities, but would secure the United States bargaining advantage by holding hostage something that the Soviets might want to keep.

The defensive strategy involved developing a system to intercept incoming Soviet missiles. Bombers could be easily shot down, but missiles still remained a credible threat. As a result, the United States began developing an anti-ballistic missile program, modifying its Nike missiles to intercept incoming missiles. Ultimately, however, this program was abandoned by the adoption of the anti-ballistic missile treaty.

== Conventional responses ==
Importance was placed on counterinsurgency and the development of unconventional military forces, unconventional tactics, and civic action programs.

=== Two-and-a-half war doctrine ===
Part of Flexible response was the strategy of being able to fight over the entire spectrum of violence by developing diverse forces for different types of warfare. This meant being able to fight multiple wars simultaneously; specifically, the US should have the peacetime capability to fight two large regional wars and a small brushfire war at the same time. The consequence of this was to increase recruiting, investment, and research for the US force posture.
