= NSC 162/2 =

1953 US National Security Council paper on Cold War policy

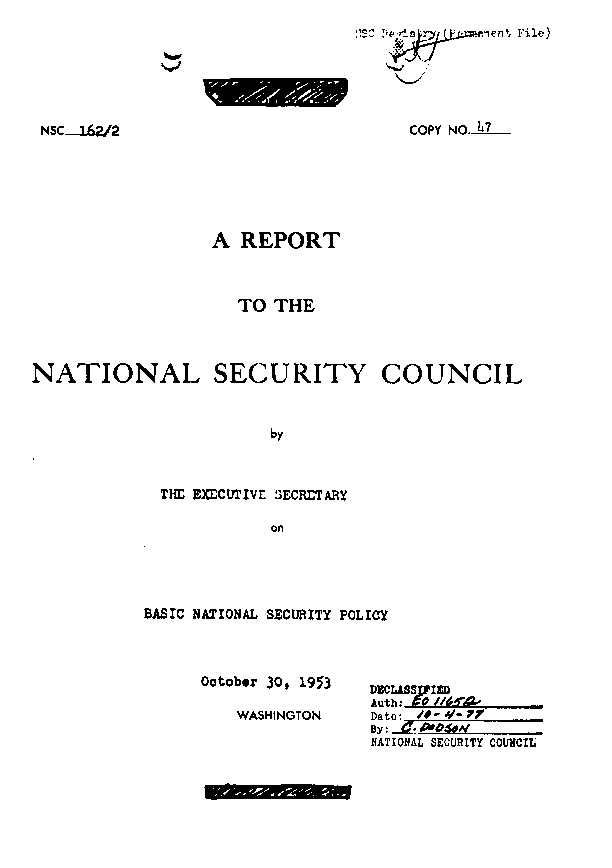
Title page

NSC 162/2 was a policy paper of the United States National Security Council approved by President Dwight D. Eisenhower on 30 October 1953 which defined the Cold War national security policy during the Eisenhower administration. NSC 162/2 was based upon NSC 162, which was the final synthesis of the task force reports of Project Solarium. On 7 January 1955, NSC 162/2 was superseded by NSC 5501.

== Massive retaliation ==
NSC 162/2 stated that the United States needs to maintain "a strong military posture, with emphasis on the capability of inflicting massive retaliatory damage by offensive striking power", and that, in the event of hostilities, the United States "will consider nuclear weapons as available for use as other munitions."

== See also ==
- Massive retaliation
- Deterrence theory
- Project Solarium
- NSC 68
