= Rollback =

Strategy of forcing a change

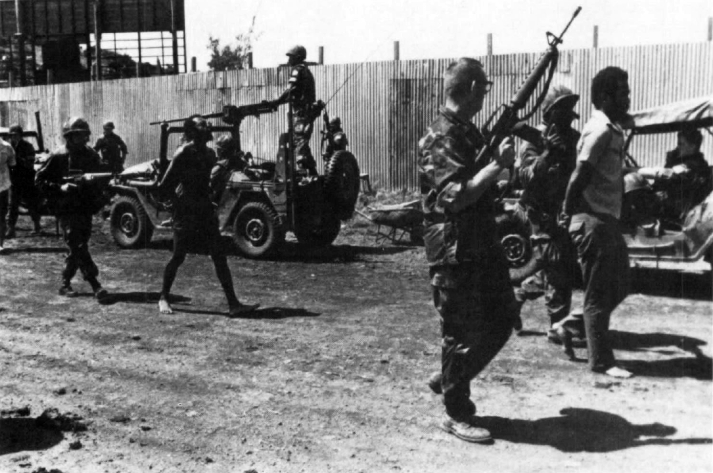
American troops detain members of the Grenadian PRA in 1983.

In political science, rollback is the strategy of forcing a change in the major policies of a state, usually by replacing its ruling regime. It contrasts with containment, which means preventing the expansion of that state, and with détente, which means developing a working relationship with that state. Most of the discussions of rollback in the scholarly literature deal with United States foreign policy toward communist countries during the Cold War. The rollback strategy was tried and was not successful in Korea in 1950 and in Iraq in 1991, but it was successful in Grenada in 1983. The United States discussed the use of rollback during the East German uprising of 1953 and the Hungarian Revolution of 1956, which were ultimately crushed by the Soviet Army, but decided against it to avoid the risk of a major war.

Rollback of governments hostile to the U.S. took place during World War II (against Fascist Italy in 1943, Nazi Germany in 1945, and Imperial Japan in 1945), Afghanistan (against the Taliban in 2001), and Iraq (against Saddam Hussein in 2003). When directed against an established government, rollback is sometimes called "regime change".

== World War II ==
Rollback includes military operations designed to destroy an enemy's armed forces and occupy its country, as was done in World War II to Italy, Germany, and Japan. (the Axis powers)

== Cold War ==
The notion of military rollback against the Soviet Union was proposed by strategist James Burnham and other strategists in the late 1940s, and by the Truman Administration against North Korea in the Korean War. Much debated was the question whether the U.S. should pursue a rollback strategy against Soviet-occupied satellite states in Eastern Europe in 1953–1956, which the United States ultimately decided against.

Instead of overt military rollback, the United States focused primarily on long-term psychological warfare and military or clandestine assistance to delegitimize Soviet-dominated communist regimes and help insurgents. These attempts began as early as 1945 in the Soviet Bloc, including efforts to provide weapons to independence fighters in the Baltic states and Ukraine. Another early effort was against Albania in 1949, following the defeat of communist forces in the Greek Civil War that year. The operation had already been betrayed to the Soviets by the British double agent Kim Philby, and led to the immediate capture or killing of the agents.

=== Harry Truman ===
In the Korean War, the United States and the United Nations officially endorsed a policy of rollback—the protection of South Korea against an invading army of the communist North Korean government—and sent UN forces across the 38th parallel.

=== Dwight Eisenhower ===
After the 1952 presidential election, Republican spokesman John Foster Dulles took the lead in promoting a rollback policy. The 1952 Republican Party's national platform reaffirmed this position, and Dwight D. Eisenhower appointed Dulles as Secretary of State. However, Eisenhower ultimately adopted containment instead of rollback in October 1953 through National Security Council document NSC 162/2, effectively abandoning rollback efforts in Europe.

Eisenhower instead relied on clandestine CIA actions to undermine hostile small governments and used economic and military foreign aid to strengthen governments supporting the American position in the Cold War. In August 1953, the United States, in collaboration with the British SIS, conducted Operation Ajax to assist the Iranian military in the restoration of the Shah. Eisenhower adviser Charles Douglas Jackson also coordinated psychological warfare against the Soviet Bloc and the USSR itself. Radio Free Europe, a private agency funded by Congress, broadcast criticisms of communist regimes directed at Soviet satellite states in the Eastern Bloc.

In 1956, Eisenhower decided not to intervene during the Hungarian Revolution of 1956, which was subsequently brutally put down by the Soviet Army. The Suez Crisis, which unfolded simultaneously, played an important role in hampering the U.S. response to the crisis in Hungary. The Suez Crisis made the condemnation of Soviet actions difficult. As Vice President Richard Nixon later explained: "We couldn't, on one hand, complain about the Soviets intervening in Hungary and, on the other hand, approve of the British and the French picking that particular time to intervene against Gamal Abdel Nasser."

=== Ronald Reagan ===
The "rollback" movement gained significant ground in the United States in the 1980s. The Reagan administration, urged on by The Heritage Foundation and other influential conservatives, began to channel weapons to movements such as the Mujahideen in Afghanistan, UNITA in Angola, and the Contras in Nicaragua. The United States launched the successful invasion of Grenada in 1983 to protect American residents and reinstate constitutional government following a coup by what Reagan called "a brutal gang of leftist thugs." Reagan's interventions came to be known as the Reagan Doctrine.

Critics argued that the Reagan Doctrine led to so-called blowback and an unnecessary intensification of Third World conflict. On the other hand, the Soviet Union eventually had to abandon its invasion of Afghanistan. Jessica Martin writes, "Insofar as rollback is concerned, American support for rebels, especially in Afghanistan, at the time helped to drain Soviet coffers and tax its human resources, contributing to that nation's overall crisis and eventual disintegration."

=== George H. W. Bush ===
After the Iraqi invasion of Kuwait on 2 August 1990, a coalition of Western militaries deployed to protect Kuwait and Saudi Arabia from Ba'athist Iraq. While the Persian Gulf War successfully freed Kuwait, many military leaders and American politicians called for a full invasion of Iraq to replace Iraqi dictator Saddam Hussein and effectively roll back his regime. However, President Bush ultimately decided against a full invasion of Iraq.

Between 1988 and 1991, the fifteen Soviet republics gradually declared their laws superior to those of the Soviet Union, and the USSR ceased to exist on December 26, 1991.

== War on terror ==
=== George W. Bush ===
Following the September 11 attacks, his administration, along with a NATO coalition, undertook a war in Afghanistan to remove the Taliban government, which it believe had harbored al-Qaeda, the group responsible for the attacks. Bush told Congress:

The Taliban must act and act immediately. They will hand over the terrorists, or they will share in their fate.

While the initial invasion succeeded in removing the Taliban from state power, after fifteen years of a US military presence which was extremely unpopular both in Afghanistan and the US was met with a insurgency, the Barack Obama administration withdrew US troops from Afghanistan in 2016.

Similarly, Bush opposed the regime of Saddam Hussein in Iraq, labeling the regime as part of an "axis of evil", which also included Iran and North Korea. Additionally, the administration falsely claimed to believe Hussein possessed weapons of mass destruction. As a result, in March 2003, the U.S. military invaded Iraq and overthrew Hussein's regime but it was met with a insurgency as well for eight years which also caused the Barack Obama administration to withdraw troops from Iraq in 2011.
