= Containment =

US Cold War foreign policy against communist spread

- 1947–1989
U.S. Isolationism / Good Neighbor policy	Détente / New world order
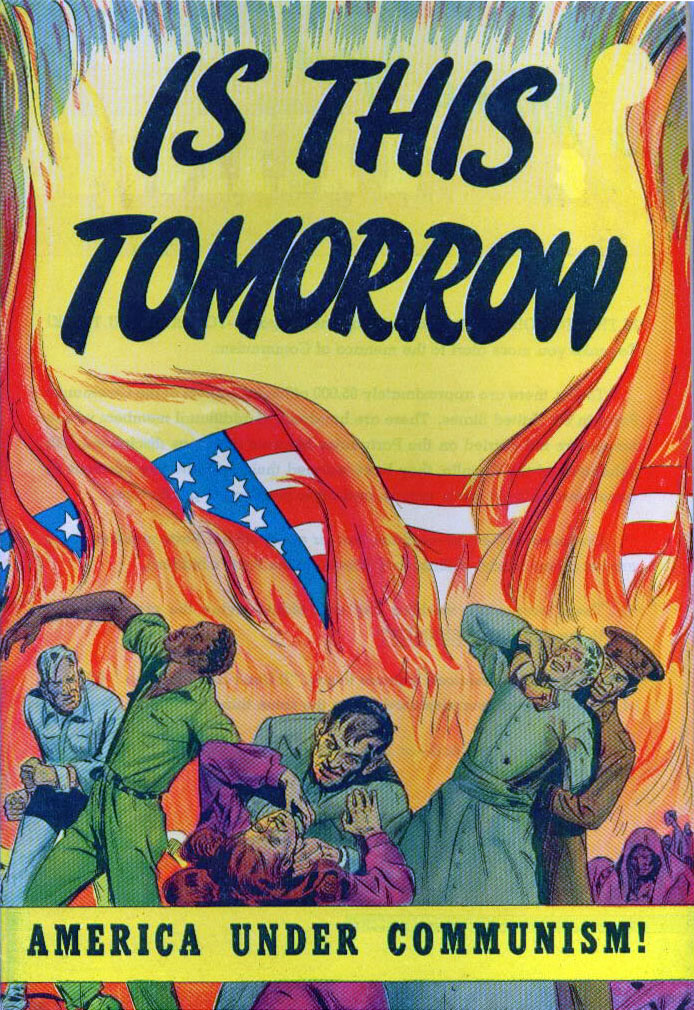
- Cover to the propaganda comic book "Is This Tomorrow"' (1947)
- Location: Global (primarily United States, Western Europe, and East Asia)
- Leaders: George F. Kennan; George Marshall; Dean Acheson; John Foster Dulles
- Presidents: Harry S. Truman; Dwight D. Eisenhower; John F. Kennedy; Lyndon B. Johnson; Richard Nixon; Jimmy Carter; Ronald Reagan
- Key events: Truman Doctrine (1947); Marshall Plan (1948); Berlin Airlift (1948–1949); Korean War (1950–1953); Vietnam War (1955–1975)

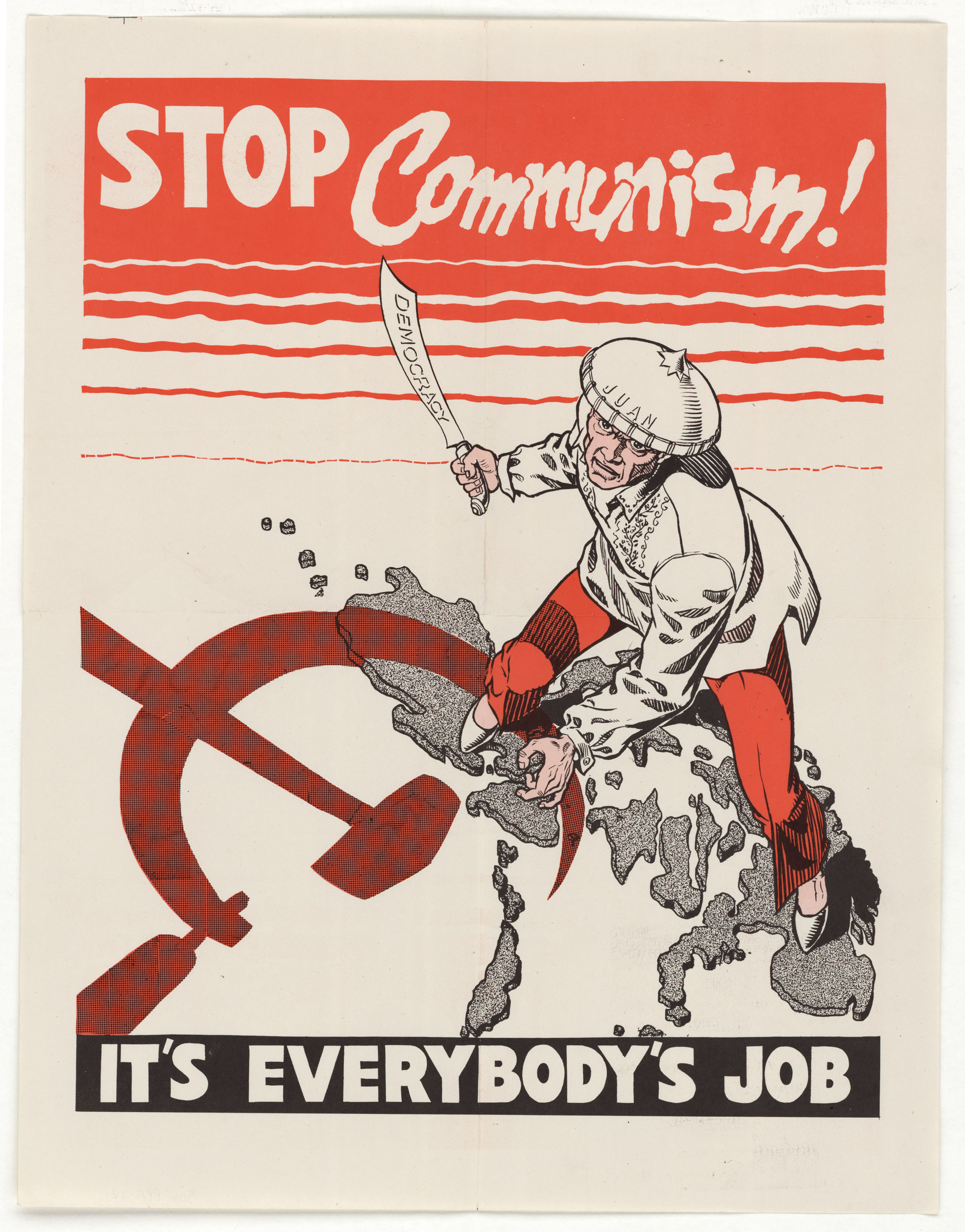
United States Information Service propaganda poster distributed in Asia depicting Juan dela Cruz ready to defend the Philippines from the threat of communism

Containment was a geopolitical strategic foreign policy pursued by the United States during the Cold War to prevent the spread of communism after the end of World War II. The name was loosely related to the term cordon sanitaire, which was containment of the Soviet Union in the interwar period

Containment represented a middle-ground position between détente (relaxation of relations) and rollback (actively replacing a regime). The basis of the doctrine was articulated in a 1946 cable by U.S. diplomat George F. Kennan during the post-World War II term of U.S. President Harry S. Truman. As a description of U.S. foreign policy, the word originated in a report Kennan submitted to US Defense Secretary James Forrestal in 1947, which was later used in a Foreign Affairs article.

In a broader context, the term is employed to denote a strategy designed to limit or hinder an opponent's capacity for international power projection. China used this term to characterize the United States' efforts to impede its global ascent.

== Earlier uses of term ==
Both Americans and Europeans were aware of significant historical antecedents. In the 1850s, anti-slavery forces in the United States developed a free soil strategy of containment to stop the expansion of slavery until it later collapsed. Historian James Oakes explains the strategy:

The Federal government would surround the south with free states, free territories, and free waters, building what they called a 'cordon of freedom' around slavery, hemming it in until the system's own internal weaknesses forced the slave states one by one to abandon slavery.

Between 1873 and 1877, Germany repeatedly intervened in the internal affairs of France's neighbors. In Belgium, Spain, and Italy, Chancellor Otto von Bismarck exerted strong and sustained political pressure to support the election or appointment of liberal, anticlerical governments. That was part of an integrated strategy to promote republicanism in France by strategically and ideologically isolating the clerical-monarchist regime of President Patrice de MacMahon. It was hoped that by surrounding France with a number of liberal states, French Republicans could defeat MacMahon and his reactionary supporters. The modern concept of containment provides a useful model for understanding the dynamics of this policy.

After the 1917 October Revolution in Russia, there were calls by Western leaders to isolate the Bolshevik government, which seemed intent on promoting worldwide revolution. In March 1919, French Premier Georges Clemenceau called for a cordon sanitaire, a ring of non-communist states, to isolate Soviet Russia. Translating that phrase, US President Woodrow Wilson called for a "quarantine."

The World War I allies launched an incursion into Russia, as after the Bolshevik Revolution, Vladimir Lenin withdrew the country from the First World War, allowing Germany to reallocate troops to face the Allied forces on the Western Front. Concurrently, President Wilson became increasingly aware of the human rights violations perpetuated by the new Russian Soviet Federative Socialist Republic, and opposed the new regime's militant atheism and advocacy of a command economy. He also was concerned that Marxism–Leninism would spread to the remainder of the Western world, and intended his landmark Fourteen Points partially to provide liberal democracy as an alternative worldwide ideology to Communism. Despite reservations, the United States, as a result of the fear of Japanese expansion into Russian-held territory and their support for the Allied-aligned Czech Legion, sent a small number of troops to Northern Russia and Siberia. The United States also provided indirect aid such as food and supplies to the White Army. The incursion was unpopular at home and lacked a cohesive strategy, leading the allies to ultimately withdraw from Russia.

The U.S. initially refused to recognize the Soviet Union, but President Franklin D. Roosevelt reversed the policy in 1933 in the hope to expand American export markets.

The Munich Agreement of 1938 was a failed attempt to contain Nazi expansion in Europe. The U.S. tried to contain Japanese expansion in Asia from 1937 to 1941, and Japan reacted with its attack on Pearl Harbor.

After Germany invaded the Soviet Union in 1941 during World War II, the U.S. and the Soviet Union found themselves allied against Germany and used rollback to defeat the Axis powers: Germany, Italy, and Japan.

== Origin (1944–1947) ==
Key State Department personnel grew increasingly frustrated with and suspicious of the Soviets as the war drew to a close. Averell Harriman, U.S. Ambassador in Moscow, once a "confirmed optimist" regarding U.S.–Soviet relations, was disillusioned by what he saw as the Soviet betrayal of the 1944 Warsaw Uprising as well as by violations of the February 1945 Yalta Agreement concerning Poland. Harriman would later have a significant influence in forming Truman's views on the Soviet Union.

In February 1946, the U.S. State Department asked George F. Kennan, then at the U.S. Embassy in Moscow, why the Russians opposed the creation of the World Bank and the International Monetary Fund. He responded with a wide-ranging analysis of Russian policy now called the Long Telegram:

Soviet power, unlike that of Hitlerite Germany, is neither schematic nor adventuristic. It does not work with fixed plans. It does not take unnecessary risks. Impervious to the logic of reason, and it is highly sensitive to the logic of force. For this reason, it can easily withdraw—and usually does when strong resistance is encountered at any point.

Kennan's cable was hailed in the State Department as "the appreciation of the situation that had long been needed." Kennan himself attributed the enthusiastic reception to timing: "Six months earlier the message would probably have been received in the State Department with raised eyebrows and lips pursed in disapproval. Six months later, it would probably have sounded redundant." Clark Clifford and George Elsey produced a report elaborating on the Long Telegram and proposing concrete policy recommendations based on its analysis. This report, which recommended "restraining and confining" Soviet influence, was presented to Truman on September 24, 1946.

In January 1947, Kennan drafted an essay entitled "The Sources of Soviet Conduct." Navy Secretary James Forrestal gave permission for the report to be published in the journal Foreign Affairs under the pseudonym "X." Biographer Douglas Brinkley has dubbed Forrestal "godfather of containment" on account of his work in distributing Kennan's writing. The use of the word "containment" originates from this so-called "X Article": "In these circumstances, it is clear that the main element of any United States policy toward the Soviet Union must be that of long-term, patient but firm and vigilant containment of Russian expansive tendencies."

Kennan later turned against the containment policy and noted several deficiencies in his X Article. He later said that by containment he meant not the containment of Soviet Power "by military means of a military threat, but the political containment of a political threat." Second, Kennan admitted a failure in the article to specify the geographical scope of "containment", and that containment was not something he believed the United States could necessarily achieve everywhere successfully.

== Harry S. Truman ==
After Republicans gained control of Congress in the 1946 elections, President Truman, a Democrat, made a dramatic speech that is often considered to mark the beginning of the Cold War. In March 1947, he requested that Congress appropriate $400 million in aid to the Greek and Turkish governments, which were fighting communist subversion. Truman pledged to, "support free peoples who are resisting attempted subjugation by armed minorities or by outside pressures." This pledge became known as the Truman Doctrine. Portraying the issue as a mighty clash between "totalitarian regimes" and "free peoples", the speech marks the adoption of containment as official US policy. Congress appropriated the money.

Truman's motives on that occasion have been the subject of considerable scholarship and several schools of interpretation. In the orthodox explanation of Herbert Feis, a series of aggressive Soviet actions in 1945–1947 in Poland, Iran, Turkey, and elsewhere awakened the American public to the new danger to freedom to which Truman responded. In the revisionist view of William Appleman Williams, Truman's speech was an expression of longstanding American expansionism. In the realpolitik view of Lynn E. Davis, Truman was a naive idealist who unnecessarily provoked the Soviets by couching disputes in terms like democracy and freedom that were alien to the communist vision.

According to a psychological analysis by Deborah Larson, Truman felt a need to prove his decisiveness and feared that aides would make unfavorable comparisons between him and his predecessor, Roosevelt. "I am here to make decisions, and whether they prove right or wrong I am going to take them", he once said.

The drama surrounding the announcement of the Truman Doctrine catered to the president's self-image of a strong and decisive leader, but his real decision-making process was more complex and gradual. The timing of the speech was not a response to any particular Soviet action but to the fact that the Republican Party had just gained control of Congress. Truman was little involved in drafting the speech and did not himself adopt the hard-line attitude that it suggested until several months later.

The British, with their own position weakened by economic distress, urgently called on the U.S. to take over the traditional British role in Greece. Undersecretary of State Dean Acheson took the lead in Washington, warning congressional leaders in late February 1947 that if the United States did not take over from the British, the result most probably would be a "Soviet breakthrough" that "might open three continents to Soviet penetration." Truman was explicit about the challenge of communism taking control of Greece. He won wide support from both parties as well as experts in foreign policy inside and outside the government. It was strongly opposed by the left, notably by former Vice President Henry A. Wallace, who ran against Truman in the 1948 presidential campaign.

Truman, under the guidance of Acheson, followed up his speech with a series of measures to contain Soviet influence in Europe, including the Marshall Plan, or European Recovery Program, and NATO, a 1949 military alliance between the U.S. and Western European nations. Because containment required detailed information about communist moves, the government relied increasingly on the Central Intelligence Agency (CIA). Established by the National Security Act of 1947, the CIA conducted espionage in foreign lands, some of it visible, more of it secret. Truman approved a classified statement of containment policy called NSC 20/4 in November 1948, the first comprehensive statement of security policy ever created by the United States. The Soviet Union's first nuclear test in 1949 prompted the National Security Council to formulate a revised security doctrine. Completed in April 1950, it became known as NSC 68. It concluded that a massive military buildup was necessary to deal with the Soviet threat. According to the report, drafted by Paul Nitze and others:

In the words of the Federalist (No. 28) "The means to be employed must be proportioned to the extent of the mischief." The mischief may be a global war or it may be a Soviet campaign for limited objectives. In either case, we should take no avoidable initiative which would cause it to become a war of annihilation, and if we have the forces to defeat a Soviet drive for limited objectives it may well be to our interest not to let it become a global war.

== Alternative strategies ==
There were three alternative policies to containment under discussion in the late 1940s. The first was a return to isolationism, minimizing American involvement with the rest of the world, a policy that was supported by conservative Republicans, especially from the Midwest, including former President Herbert Hoover and Senator Robert A. Taft. However Arthur H. Vandenberg, said that policy had helped cause World War II and so was too dangerous to revive.

The second policy was a continuation of the détente policies that aimed at friendly relationships with the Soviet Union, especially trade. Roosevelt had been the champion of détente, but he was dead, and most of his inner circle had left the government by 1946. The chief proponent of détente was Henry Wallace, a former vice president and the Secretary of Commerce under Truman. Wallace's position was supported by far-left elements of the CIO, but they were purged in 1947 and 1948. Wallace ran against Truman on the Progressive Party ticket in 1948, but his campaign was increasingly dominated by Communists, which helped to discredit détente.

The third policy was rollback, an aggressive effort to undercut or destroy the Soviet Union itself. Military rollback against the Soviet Union was proposed by James Burnham and other conservative strategists in the late 1940s. After 1954, Burnham and like-minded strategists became editors and regular contributors to William F. Buckley Jr.'s National Review magazine.

Truman himself adopted a rollback strategy in the Korean War after the success of the Inchon landings in September 1950, only to reverse himself after the Chinese counterattack two months later and revert to containment. General Douglas MacArthur called on Congress to continue the rollback policy, but Truman fired him for insubordination.

Under President Dwight D. Eisenhower, a rollback strategy was considered against communism in Eastern Europe from 1953 to 1956. Eisenhower agreed to a propaganda campaign to roll back the influence of communism psychologically, but he refused to intervene in the 1956 Hungarian Revolution, mainly for fear that it would cause World War III. Since late 1949, when the Soviets had successfully tested an atomic bomb, they had been known to possess nuclear weapons.

== Korea ==
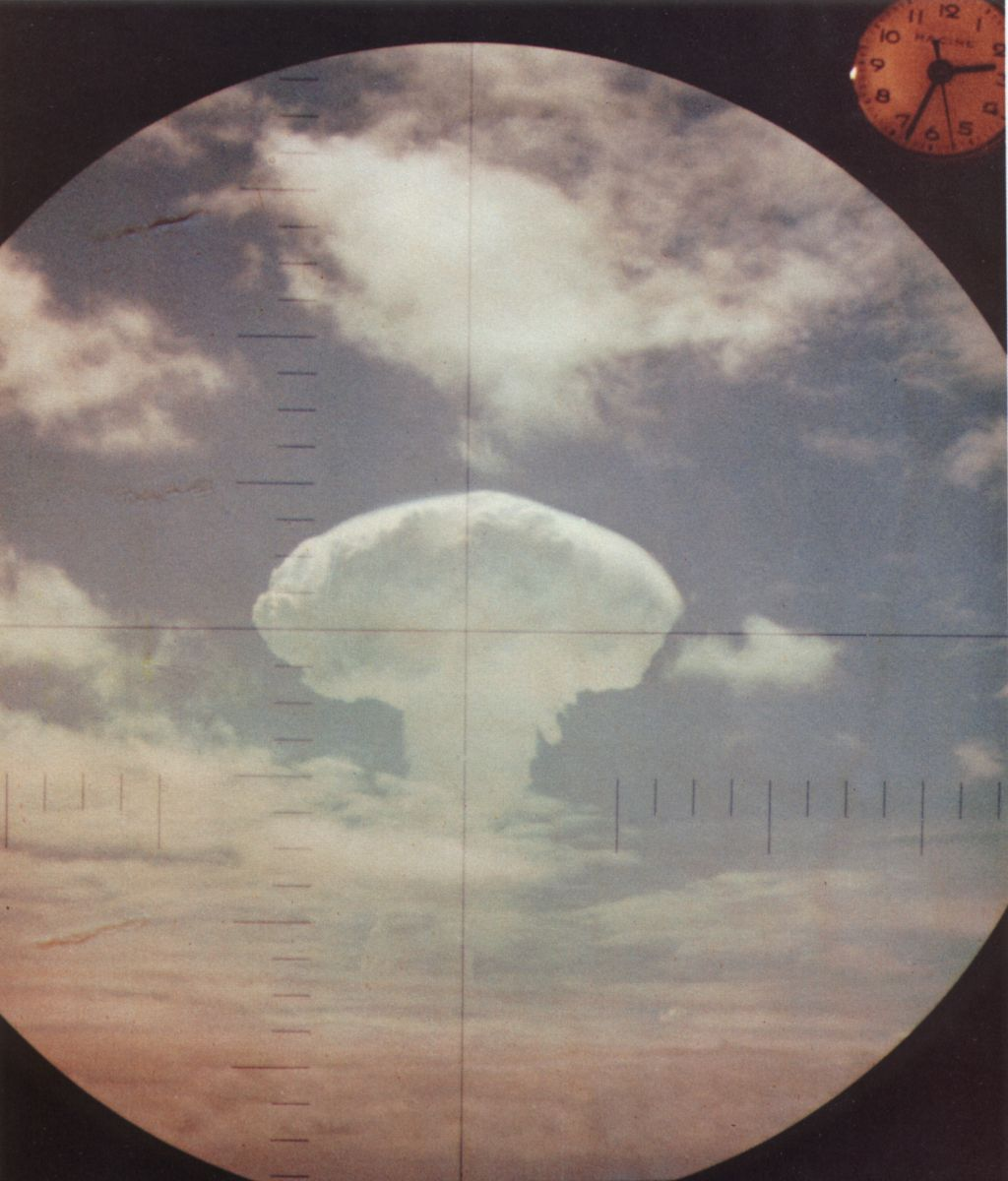
A 1962 nuclear explosion as seen through the periscope of a US Navy submarine. The goal of containment was to 'contain' communism without a nuclear war.

The U.S. followed containment when it first entered the Korean War to defend South Korea from a communist invasion by North Korea. Initially, this directed the action of the U.S. to only push back North Korea across the 38th Parallel and restore South Korea's sovereignty, thereby allowing North Korea's survival as a state. However, the success of the Inchon landing inspired the U.S. and the United Nations to adopt a rollback strategy instead and to overthrow communist North Korea, thus allowing nationwide elections under UN auspices. General Douglas MacArthur then advanced across the 38th Parallel into North Korea. The Chinese, fearful of a possible U.S. presence on their border or even an invasion by them, then sent in a large army and defeated the UN forces, pushing them back below the 38th parallel. Truman publicly hinted that he might use his "ace in the hole" of the atomic bomb, but Mao was unmoved. The episode was used to support the wisdom of the containment doctrine as opposed to rollback. The Communists were later pushed back to roughly around the original border, with minimal changes. Truman criticized MacArthur's focus on absolute victory and adopted a "limited war" policy. His focus shifted to negotiating a settlement, which was finally reached in 1953. For his part, MacArthur denounced Truman's "no-win policy."

== Dulles ==
Many Republicans, including John Foster Dulles, were concerned that Truman had been too timid. In 1952, Dulles called for rollback and the eventual liberation of Eastern Europe. Dulles was named secretary of state by incoming President Eisenhower, but Eisenhower's decision not to intervene during the 1956 Hungarian Revolution, which was put down by the Soviet Army, made containment a bipartisan doctrine. Eisenhower relied on clandestine CIA actions to undermine hostile governments and used economic and military foreign aid to strengthen governments supporting the American position in the Cold War.

== Cuba ==
In the Cuban Missile Crisis of 1962, the top officials in Washington debated using rollback to get rid of Soviet nuclear missiles, which were threatening the United States. There was fear of a nuclear war until a deal was reached in which the Soviets would publicly remove their nuclear weapons, the United States would secretly remove its missiles from Turkey and to avoid invading Cuba. The policy of containing Cuba was put into effect by President John F. Kennedy and continued until 2015.

== Vietnam ==
Senator Barry Goldwater, the Republican candidate for president in 1964, challenged containment and asked, "Why not victory?" President Lyndon Johnson, the Democratic nominee, answered that rollback risked nuclear war. Johnson explained containment doctrine by quoting the Bible: "Hitherto shalt thou come, but not further." Goldwater lost to Johnson in the 1964 election by a wide margin. Johnson adhered closely to containment during the Vietnam War. Rejecting proposals by General William Westmoreland for U.S. ground forces to advance into Laos and cut communist supply lines, Johnson gathered a group of elder statesmen called The Wise Men. The group included Kennan, Acheson, and other former Truman advisors.

Rallies in support of the troops were discouraged for fear that a patriotic response would lead to demands for victory and rollback. Military responsibility was divided among three generals so that no powerful theater commander could emerge to challenge Johnson as MacArthur had challenged Truman.

Nixon, who replaced Johnson in 1969, referred to his foreign policy as détente, a relaxation of tension. Although it continued to aim at restraining the Soviet Union, it was based on political realism, thinking in terms of national interest, as opposed to crusades against communism or for democracy. Emphasis was placed on talks with the Soviet Union concerning nuclear weapons called the Strategic Arms Limitation Talks. Nixon reduced U.S. military presence in Vietnam to the minimum required to contain communist advances, in a policy called Vietnamization. As the war continued, it grew less popular. A Democratic Congress forced Nixon, a Republican, to abandon the policy in 1973 by enacting the Case–Church Amendment, which ended U.S. military involvement in Vietnam and led to successful communist invasions of South Vietnam, Laos, and Cambodia.

== Afghanistan ==
President Jimmy Carter came to office in 1977 and was committed to a foreign policy that emphasized human rights. However, in response to the Soviet invasion of Afghanistan, containment was again made a priority. The wording of the Carter Doctrine (1980) intentionally echoed that of the Truman Doctrine.

== Reagan Doctrine ==
Following the communist victory in Vietnam, Democrats began to view further communist advances as inevitable, but Republicans returned to the rollback doctrine. Ronald Reagan, a long-time advocate of rollback, was elected U.S. president in 1980. He took a more aggressive approach to dealings with the Soviets and believed that détente was misguided and peaceful coexistence was tantamount to surrender. When the Soviet Union invaded Afghanistan in 1979, American policymakers worried that the Soviets were making a run for control of the Persian Gulf. Throughout the 1980s, under a policy that came to be known as the Reagan Doctrine, the United States provided technical and economic assistance to the Afghan guerrillas (mujahideen) fighting against the Soviet army.

== After the Cold War ==
The conclusion of the Cold War in 1992 marked the official end of the containment policy, but the U.S. kept its bases in the areas around Russia, such as those in Iceland, Germany, and Turkey. Much of the policy later helped influence U.S. foreign policy towards China in the 21st century.

== See also ==
- Appeasement
- Cordon sanitaire (international relations)
- Domino theory
- Détente
- Isolationism
- Marshall Plan
- Rollback
- Truman Doctrine
- Dual containment (Iran-Iraq containment)
- United States foreign policy toward the People's Republic of China
