= New Look (policy) =

US national security policy

- John Foster Dulles on Time magazine cover, 1953
- Date: 1953–1961
- Location: United States
- Type: National security policy / Foreign policy
- Theme: Nuclear deterrence, Massive retaliation, and fiscal conservatism
- Cause: Structural reassessment of Cold War costs following the Korean War (articulated via NSC 162/2)
- Participants: Dwight D. Eisenhower, John Foster Dulles, National Security Council
- Outcome: Shifted military funding from conventional forces to airpower and nuclear assets; popularized brinkmanship and increased reliance on covert CIA operations

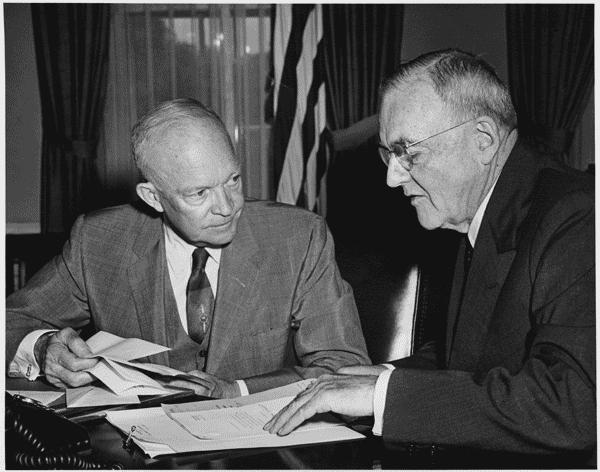
Secretary of State John Foster Dulles, right, shown here with President Eisenhower in 1956, became identified with the doctrine of "massive retaliation."

The New Look was the name given to the national security policy of the United States during the administration of President Dwight D. Eisenhower. It reflected Eisenhower's concern for balancing the Cold War military commitments of the United States with the nation's financial resources. The policy emphasized reliance on strategic nuclear weapons as well as a reorganisation of conventional forces in an effort to deter potential threats, both conventional and nuclear, from the Eastern Bloc of nations headed by the Soviet Union.

== History ==
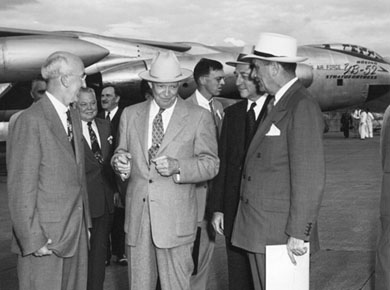
President Eisenhower and members of his Cabinet inspect the YB-52 prototype of the B-52.

In its narrowest sense, the New Look was the name applied to the Department of Defense budget for Fiscal Year 1955, which was the first defense budget prepared entirely by Eisenhower's own Joint Chiefs of Staff. It was based on an extensive reappraisal of U.S. military requirements that began among Eisenhower and his closest advisers immediately following his election in November 1952. It was formalized in National Security Council document 162/2 (NSC 162/2), which Eisenhower approved on October 30, 1953.

== Increased reliance on tactical nuclear weapons ==
Eisenhower said of tactical nuclear weapons that "on strictly military targets and for strictly military purposes, I see no reason why they shouldn't be used just exactly as you would use a bullet or anything else". NSC 162/2 reflected Eisenhower's desire for a "long-haul" approach to security planning that would maintain a more or less constant level of military preparedness, consistent with the health of the U.S. economy. In this respect, it differed from NSC 68, approved by President Harry S. Truman on September 30, 1950. Truman's advisers believed that Soviet military capabilities would reach a maximum relative to those of the United States and its allies in the mid-1950s.

Eisenhower rejected the idea that one period would be any more dangerous than another and urged his planners to think in terms of a Soviet threat that was economic as well as military. He wanted to avoid, in his own words, "an unbearable security burden leading to economic disaster." With the costly experience of the Korean War in mind, Eisenhower was fearful that U.S. resources would be drained by Soviet-inspired regional conflicts.

== Covert operations ==
The New Look Policy also embodied an increasing reliance on the use of covert operations and espionage. This was not only due to the fact that clandestine forces were cheap when compared to conventional forces, but also because covert techniques were legitimised in the context of the Cold War.

The Special Atomic Demolition Munition (SADM) program, relying on small, portable nuclear weapons, also was consistent with the New Look policy. Green Light Teams, U.S. commandos trained in secret exercises in which they carried actual nuclear weapons, were set up. Their missions would have been to infiltrate targets carrying nuclear weapons, to detonate and to be exfiltrated, although the commandos often understood that they were to be sent on kamikaze missions.

== U.S. government propaganda ==
Psychological warfare was a nonviolent technique of combatting the Soviets that especially appealed to Eisenhower, with the goal of flooding communist states with anti-Soviet propaganda.

== Massive Retaliation and the New Look ==
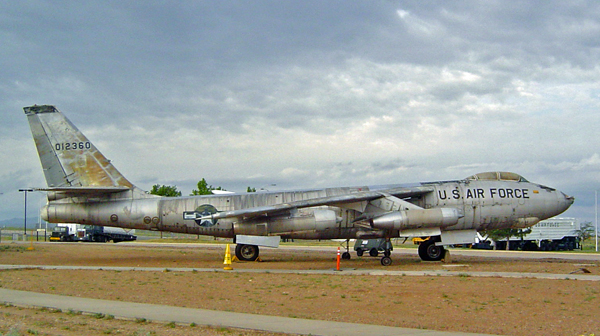
The B-47 long-range bomber was the mainstay of U.S. deterrence during most of the New Look.

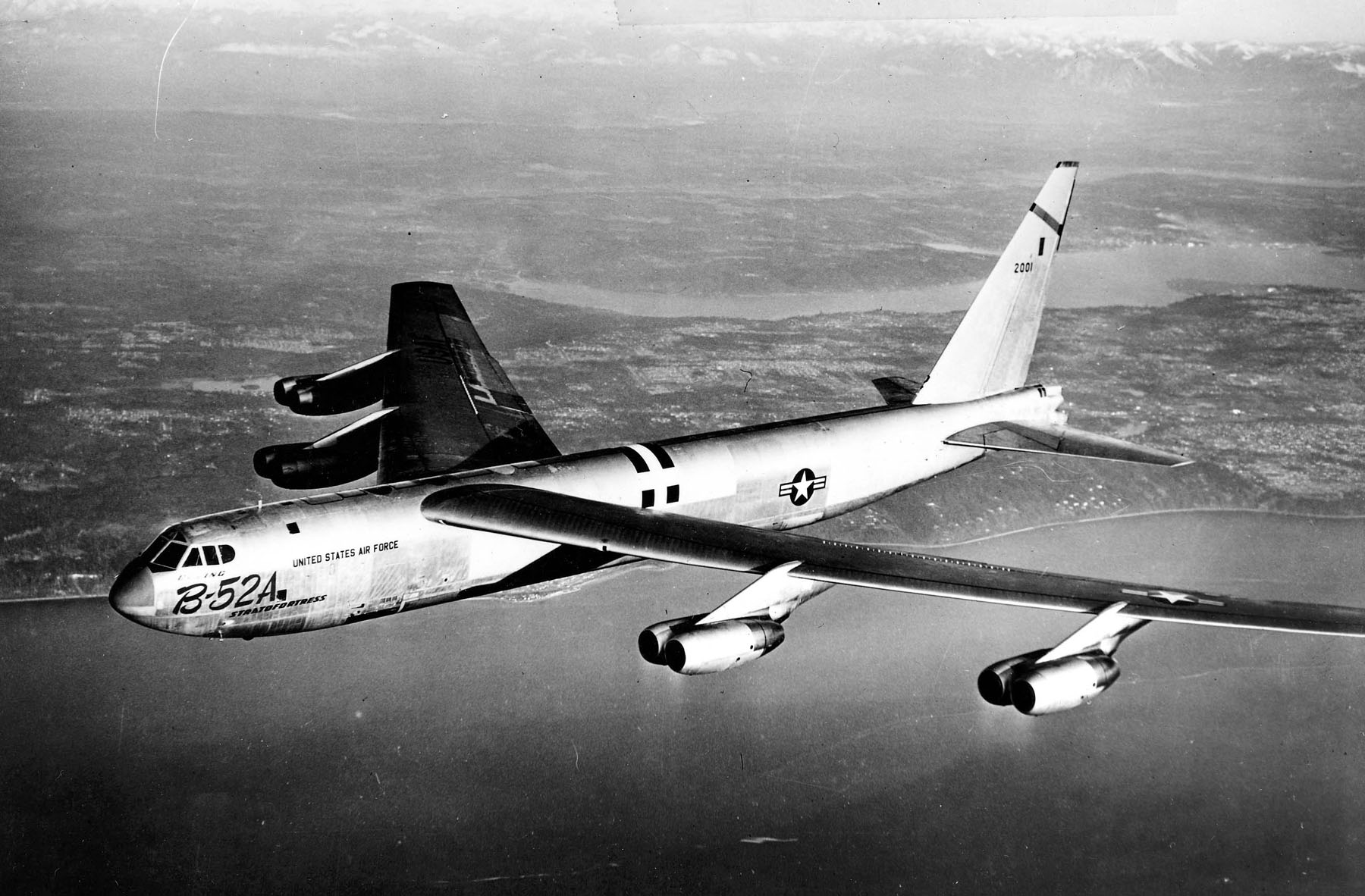
A B-52 long-range bomber. The first models were deployed just as the New Look took shape.

In order to contain defense costs, the New Look brought about a shift in emphasis from conventional military capability to "air-atomic" capability in the form of the Strategic Air Command within a scaled-down overall military establishment. Land and naval forces were cut. Continental air defense was expanded. Although strategic air power attained a lower level than the Truman administration had projected, it became the centerpiece of U.S. security thinking, embodied in the doctrine of "Massive Retaliation." Summarized in the popular slogan "more bang for the buck," Massive Retaliation was intended to be both a deterrent to an enemy and an economy of scale if deterrence failed.

The doctrine was proclaimed in its most absolute form by Secretary of State John Foster Dulles in a speech before the Council on Foreign Relations on January 12, 1954, in which he said, "Local defenses must be reinforced by the further deterrent of massive retaliatory power [emphasis added]. Dulles continued:

The way to deter aggression is for the free community to be willing and able to respond vigorously at places and with means of its own choosing.

...

Now the Department of Defense and the Joint Chiefs of Staff can shape our military establishment to fit what is our policy, instead of having to try to be ready to meet the enemy's many choices. That permits of a selection of military means instead of a multiplication of means, As a result, it is now possible to get, and share, more basic security at less cost.

=== Criticism of Massive Retaliation ===
What Dulles implied was that the United States was prepared to respond to a Soviet-backed conventional threat anywhere with a nuclear strike against the Soviet Union itself. Critics of Massive Retaliation such as historian John Lewis Gaddis have pointed out that the doctrine was not credible in the face of "less-than-total challenges" such as the Soviet intervention in the 1956 Hungarian Revolution, and that whatever credibility it might have had diminished steadily as Soviet strategic power grew. Furthermore, it theoretically provided the Soviet Union with an incentive to strike first to disarm the United States. The Hungarian Revolution involved a matter internal to the Eastern Bloc, so it is unclear whether any sort of conventional military response would have been undertaken regardless.

== "New" New Look ==
1958 deployment of tactical atomic weapons in Korea

The refusal of the United States to act to prevent the defeat of France by the communist-led Viet Minh at the Battle of Dien Bien Phu, just four months after the Dulles speech, highlighted the political difficulties Eisenhower faced in balancing interference in Asia with his determination to keep the U.S. out of a "hot war". His refusal to intervene using air strikes – a tactic that he decided would have been ineffective in the scenario of Dien Bien Phu – led instead to a third option: a threat of nuclear strikes against strategic Chinese targets, in line with "Massive Retaliation". This was approved on May 26, on the condition that both congress and U.S. allies supported it.

This tactic could not be relied upon to secure US interests in every case however. Defense planners, therefore, began shaping a "new" New Look marked by emphasis on strategic "sufficiency," not superiority; on tactical nuclear weapons to fight "limited wars;" and on standing forces as opposed to reserves. The emphasis was still primarily on nuclear weapons and the justification was still that of economy, but a shift toward what would later be called "flexible response" had begun.

The new approach was embodied in NSC 5440 (approved as NSC 5501 on January 7, 1955), finalized in December 1954, which stated:

The ability to apply force selectively and flexibly will become increasingly important in maintaining the morale and will of the free world to resist aggression. As the fear of nuclear war grows, the United States and its allies must never allow themselves to get into the position where they must choose between (a) not responding to local aggression and (b) applying force in a way which our own people or our allies would consider entails undue risk of nuclear devastation. However, the United States cannot afford to preclude itself from using nuclear weapons even in a local situation, if such use… will best advance U.S. security interests. In the last analysis, if confronted by the choice of (a) acquiescing in Communist aggression or (b) taking measures risking either general war or loss of allied support, the United States must be prepared to take these risks if necessary for its security.

According to historian Campbell Craig:

NSC 5440 was a fundamental revision of the earlier BNSP [Basic National Security Policy]. Its authors (a) renounced massive retaliation, (b) precisely articulated the strategy of "flexible response" as it would become known seven years later, and (c) predicted, in the last sentence, exactly the dilemma which the Eisenhower administration would face in Berlin four years hence.'
