= Limited war =

War in which the parties limit their scope

A limited war is one in which the belligerents do not expend all of the resources at their disposal, whether human, industrial, agricultural, military, natural, technological, or otherwise in a specific conflict. This may be to preserve those resources for other purposes, or because it might be more difficult for the participants to use all of an area's resources rather than part of them. Limited war is the opposite concept to total war.

== Examples ==
=== American Indians ===
Many American Indians practiced limited warfare or similar behaviors. Eastern groups at the time of contact with Europeans often would not kill all enemies but would capture many for adoption to replenish their own populations. That is related to mourning wars. The Aztec waged flower wars to keep subordinate nations symbolically defeated and capture sacrificial victims, who were symbolically adopted. This style of war left little chance for noncombatants to be harmed or physical infrastructure to be destroyed.

=== Crimean War ===
For the Crimean War, British Prime Minister Lord Palmerston decided to fight a limited war against Russia since waging a total war would have required massive reform of the armed forces.

=== Korean War ===
At the beginning of the Korean War, US President Harry S. Truman and General Douglas MacArthur strongly disagreed with each other. Truman believed in the containment of North Korea north of the 38th parallel. MacArthur pressed for the destroying and routing (rollback) of North Korea. The disagreement escalated to the end of MacArthur's command and career after he had exasperated and frustrated Truman's limited war policy. Truman gave the following reasons for the policy:

"The Kremlin [Soviet Union] is trying, and has been trying for a long time, to drive a wedge between us and the other nations. It wants to see us isolated. It wants to see us distrusted. It wants to see us feared and hated by our allies. Our allies agree with us in the course we are following. They do not believe that we should take the initiative to widen the conflict in the Far East. If the United States were to widen the conflict, we might well have to go it alone.... If we go it alone in Asia, we may destroy the unity of the free nations against aggression. Our European allies are nearer Russia than we are. They are in far greater danger.... Going it alone brought the world to the disaster of World War II.... I do not propose to strip this country of its allies in the face of Soviet danger. The path of collected security is our only sure defense against the dangers that threaten us."

=== Vietnam War ===
The concept of limited war was also used in the Vietnam War by the United States under Presidents John F. Kennedy and Lyndon B. Johnson as part of a strategy to contain the spread of communism without provoking a wider confrontation with the Soviet Union. Richard Barnet, who quit the State Department in 1963 after because he disagreed with Kennedy's incremental Vietnam escalation, described his misgivings in 1968: "The President had rejected major military intervention as a conscious policy, but he had set in force the bureaucratic momentum that would make it a certainty."

=== War of Attrition ===
The War of Attrition, fought between Israel and Egypt from 1967 to 1970, mostly consisted of artillery shelling, aerial warfare, and small-scale raids.

=== Falklands War ===
Often seen as a "textbook example of a limited war - limited in time, in location, in objectives and in means," the Falklands War was fought over the course of 10 weeks and ended with just over 1000 casualties on both sides.

=== NATO bombing of Yugoslavia ===
The NATO bombing of Yugoslavia, part of the Kosovo War, was a limited war for NATO, which predominantly used a large-scale air campaign to destroy Yugoslav military infrastructure from high altitudes.

=== Second Sino Indian War ===
The Second Sino-Indian War was fought in 1967 between China and India in the Sikkim sector of the Line of Actual Control. It is also known as the 1967 Nathu La and Cho La clashes.
