= Marc Trachtenberg =

American political scientist

Marc Trachtenberg (born February 9, 1946) is a professor of political science at the University of California, Los Angeles. He received his Ph.D. in history from the University of California, Berkeley, in 1974 and taught for many years for the history department at the University of Pennsylvania before coming to University of California, Los Angeles.

Trachtenberg was a Woodrow Wilson Fellow in 1966–1967, a Guggenheim Fellow in 1983–1984, a German Marshall Fund Fellow in 1994–1995, and an adjunct research fellow at the John F. Kennedy School of Government's Center for Science and International Affairs in 1986–1987. In 2000 he received the American Historical Association's George Louis Beer Prize. He maintains a website dedicated to Cold War research.

== Works ==
- Reparation in World Politics: France and European Economic Diplomacy, 1916-1923 (Columbia University Press, 1980).
- History and Strategy (Princeton University Press, 1991).
- A Constructed Peace: The Making of the European Settlement, 1945-1963 (Princeton University Press, 1999).
- The Craft of International History: A Guide to Method(Princeton University Press, 2006).
- The Cold War and After: History, Theory, and the Logic of International Politics (Princeton University Press, 2012).
