= NSC 68 =

Top-secret policy paper

United States Objectives and Programs for National Security, better known as NSC 68, was a 66-page top secret U.S. National Security Council (NSC) policy paper drafted by the Department of State and Department of Defense and presented to President Harry S. Truman on 7 April 1950. It was one of the most important American policy statements of the Cold War. In the words of scholar Ernest R. May, NSC 68 "provided the blueprint for the militarization of the Cold War from 1950 to the collapse of the Soviet Union at the beginning of the 1990s." NSC 68 and its subsequent amplifications advocated a large expansion in the military budget of the United States, the development of a hydrogen bomb, and increased military aid to allies of the United States. It made the rollback of global Communist expansion a high priority and rejected the alternative policies of détente and containment of the Soviet Union.

== Historical background ==
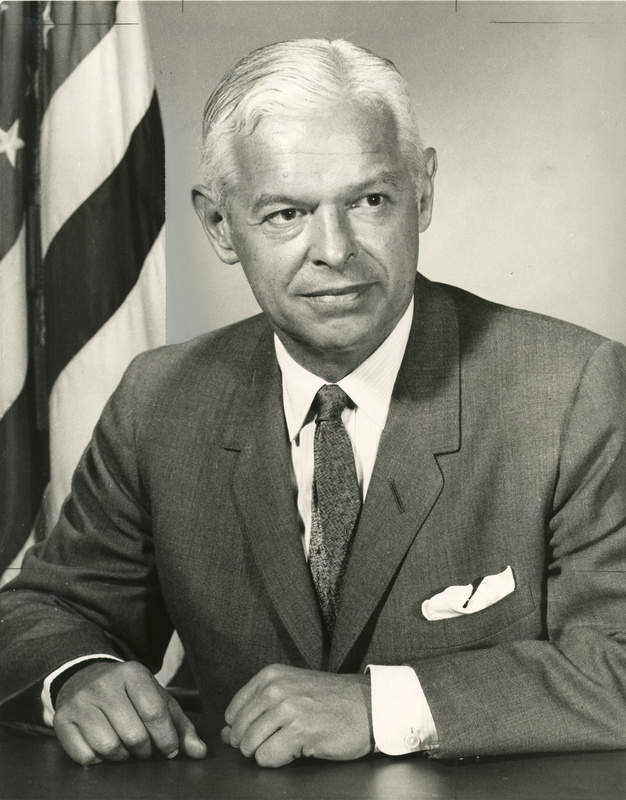
NSC 68 was drafted under the guidance of Paul H. Nitze, Director of Policy Planning for the United States Department of State, 1950–1953.

By 1950, U.S. national security policies required reexamination due to a series of events: the North Atlantic Treaty Organization (NATO) was operational, military assistance for European allies had begun, the Soviet Union had detonated an atomic bomb, and the communists had solidified their control of China. In addition, a British sterling-dollar crisis in the summer of 1949 had brought home to U.S. officials that the Marshall Plan would not suffice to cure Western European economic ills by 1952, the Plan's scheduled end year, with the prospect that Western Europe would have no choice but to pursue autarky, as it had in the 1930s, with all the attendant difficulties that would pose for the world economy generally and the U.S. economy particularly. Similar problems were also plaguing Japan. With these threats to the U.S. and its allies expanding, on 31 January 1950 President Truman directed the Department of State and Department of Defense "to undertake a reexamination of our objectives in peace and war and of the effect of these objectives on our strategic plans." A State-Defense Policy Review Group was set up under the chairmanship of Paul Nitze of the State Department.

Nitze, an advocate of rollback, ensured that only the most severe claims about the Soviet Union were cited in the document. The analysis of top Kremlin experts like George Kennan, Llewellyn Thompson, and Charles Bohlen, were categorically omitted. The Kennan–Thompson–Bohlen group maintained that Stalin's principal goal was to secure tight control of the USSR and its satellites, but that he had no plan to seek global domination (an assessment shared by most historians today). Nitze however, contended that the Soviets were determined to conquer the whole of Europe and most of Asia and Africa. Dean Acheson, another hawkish adviser to Truman, wrote that the purpose of NSC 68 was to "bludgeon the mind of top government that not only could the president make a decision, but that the decision could be carried out."

The Defense Department representatives on the committee initially resisted proposals that would exceed the existing $12.5 billion ceiling on defense spending.

The report, designated NSC 68, was presented to President Truman on 7 April 1950, who passed it on to the NSC for further consideration on 12 April 1950.

NSC Study Group:

- Paul Nitze, Chair
- John P. Davis
- Robert Tufts
- Robert Hooker
- Dean Acheson
- Charles E. Bohlen
- Major General Truman Landon, Joint Chiefs Representative
- Samuel S. Butano
- Robert Lovett, Deputy Secretary of Defense

Originally, President Truman did not support NSC 68 when it was brought to him in 1950. He believed that it was not specific about which programs would be affected or changed and it also did not go well with his previous defense spending limits. Truman sent it back for further review until he finally approved it in 1951.

The document outlined the de facto national security strategy of the United States for that time (although it was not an official National Security Strategy in the form known today) and analyzed the capabilities of the Soviet Union and of the United States of America from military, economic, political, and psychological standpoints.

NSC 68 described the challenges facing the United States in cataclysmic terms. "The issues that face us are momentous," the document stated, "involving the fulfillment or destruction not only of this Republic but of civilization itself."

The document was declassified in 1975.

== Content and meaning ==
NSC 68 saw the goals and aims of the United States as sound, yet poorly implemented, calling "present programs and plans... dangerously inadequate". Although George F. Kennan's theory of containment articulated a multifaceted approach for U.S. foreign policy in response to the perceived Soviet threat, the report recommended policies that emphasized military over diplomatic action. Kennan's influential 1947 X Article advocated a policy of containment towards the Soviet Union. It described containment as "a policy of calculated and gradual coercion" and called for significant peacetime military spending, in which the U.S. possessed "superior overall power ... in dependable combination with other like-minded nations." In particular, it called for a military capable of

- Defending the Western Hemisphere and essential allied areas so that their war-making capabilities could be developed;
- Providing and protecting a mobilization base while the offensive forces required for victory were being built up;
- Conducting offensive operations to destroy vital elements of the Soviet war-making capacity, and to keep the enemy off balance until the full offensive strength of the United States and its allies could be brought to bear;
- Defending and maintaining the lines of communication and base areas necessary to the execution of the above tasks; and
- Providing such aid to allies as would be essential to the execution of their role in the above tasks.

NSC 68 itself did not contain any specific cost estimates at a time when the United States was committing six to seven percent of its GNP to defense. It was evident that the limits the President had previously set on defense spending were too low. The report called for tripling defense spending to $40 or $50 billion per year from the original $13 billion set for 1950. It specified an increase of taxes and a "reduction of Federal expenditures for purposes other than defense and foreign assistance, if necessary by the deferment of certain desirable programs", as a means for paying for it. However, several officials involved in the preparation of the study, including the future chairman of the president's Council of Economic Advisers Leon Keyserling, suggested that the massive increase in military spending could be afforded by deliberate acceptance of government deficits, which would have the added benefit of energising and stimulating parts of the American economy, as it did after 1930. Indeed, the document did note that achieving a high gross national product "might itself be aided by a build-up of the economic and military strength of the United States," and the Deputy Secretary of Defense Robert Lovett also suggested that the American economy "might benefit from the kind of build-up we are suggesting". The memorandum saw that the United States would grow exponentially with the added funding towards the military. The added funding would strengthen the current military, causing the Soviet Union to strengthen its military as well. However, since both superpowers had different economies, outcomes from this would differ greatly. They understood that the Soviet Union's output was nearly half of the United States' current output, so they assumed it was only a matter of time before the Soviet Union could not keep up. Understanding communism, they knew that the USSR was already producing at full capacity. There are four variables that determine output: consumption, investment, government expenditure, and exports. In order to increase military strength, the USSR would be forced to allocate resources from other avenues such as investment or consumption. Deprive investments and the country's economic growth would become stagnant. Deprive consumption and that would cause further civil unrest and lower the quality of life of its citizens. On the other hand, the United States did not run into the problem the Soviets did. What came from NSC-68 was an economic ideology that dominated the United States economy for the majority of the Cold War, Military Keynesianism. Economists assumed that the United States normally operated below production capacity. This assumption proved essential to the United States victory of military strength since the increase of government expenditure would place the nation at capacity. However, unlike the USSR, the United States economy would grow since it would be increasing its production.

== Relation to U.S. foreign policy ==
The argument is made that if the Soviet sphere of influence continues to grow, it may become such a powerful force, that no coalition of nations could band together and defeat it. The implication was that militarization is needed for American self-preservation. In other words, the aggressive nature of Soviet expansion required a strong response from the U.S. to prevent the destruction of America. This was phrased in a context of military exploits (referring to the military victory in World War I and World War II), and therefore emphasized military expansion.

Also crucial in understanding this document is the language. Primary sources must be read carefully to recognize themes or motifs. Adjectives provide valuable insight into the motives of this document's authors, and the impression it had on its intended audience. An example is the description of the international situation, as provoked by the Soviet Union, as endemic. By using this language, it is clear that the authors wished to portray the Soviet Union as a sickness, and the U.S. as the cure. This message was received loud and clear, and dominated many foreign policy decisions throughout the Cold War.

== Internal debate ==
NSC 68 drew some criticism from senior government officials who believed the Cold War was being escalated unnecessarily. When the report was sent to top officials in the Truman administration for review before its official delivery to the President, many of them scoffed at its arguments. Willard Thorp questioned its contention that the "USSR is steadily reducing the discrepancy between its overall economic strength and that of the United States." Thorp argued: "I do not feel that this position is demonstrated, but rather the reverse... The actual gap is widening in our favor." He pointed out that in 1949 the US economy had increased twofold over that of the Soviet Union. Steel production in the US outpaced the Soviet Union by 2 million tons; stockpiling of goods and oil production both far exceeded Soviet amounts. As for Soviet military investment, Thorp was skeptical that the USSR was committing such large portion of its GDP: "I suspect a larger portion of Soviet investment went into housing." William Schaub of the Bureau of the Budget was particularly harsh, believing that "in every arena," the Air Force, the Army, the Navy, the stockpiling of atomic bombs, the economy, the US was far superior to the Soviet Union. Kennan, although "father" of the containment policy, also disagreed with the document, particularly its call for massive rearmament (FRUS, 1950, Vol. I).

=== Truman's position ===
President Harry S. Truman, even after the Soviets became a nuclear power, sought to curb military spending. However, he did not reject the recommendations of NSC 68 out of hand, but instead requested more information i.e. asking for an estimate of the costs involved. In the ensuing two months, little progress was made on the report. By June, Nitze had practically given up on it. But on 25 June 1950, North Korean forces crossed the 38th parallel north. With the Korean War begun, NSC 68 took on new importance. As Acheson later remarked: "Korea... created the stimulus which made action."

=== Public opinion ===
The Truman Administration began a nationwide public relations campaign to convince Congress and opinion-setters of the need for strategic rearmament and containment of Soviet communism. It had to overcome isolationists, including Senator Robert A. Taft, who wanted less world involvement, as well as intense anti-Communists such as James Burnham who proposed an alternative strategy of rollback that would eliminate Communism or perhaps launch a preemptive war. The State Department and the White House used the North Korean attack of June 1950 and the see-saw battles during the first few months of the Korean War to steer congressional and public opinion toward a course of rearmament between the two poles of preventive war and isolationism.

== Historical debate ==
NSC 68 is a source of much historical debate as is the escalation of the Cold War. As Ken Young, a historian of the early Cold War period, has stated, "The report has been subject to continuous analysis and commentary. ... Even though NSC 68 appeared in the midpoint of the twentieth century, it retains singular meaning in the 21st."

It was an important part of an overall shift in American foreign policy to a comprehensive containment strategy that was confirmed by successive administrations. In 1962 scholar Paul Y. Hammond presented the first detailed, contemporary, interviews-based account of the formation of NSC 68. Subsequent analyses range from Michael Hogan's belief that NSC 68 portrayed the threat "in the worst light possible" to those believing NSC 68 provided an accurate picture of a genuine and growing threat.

Cold War expert Melvyn Leffler describes the characterization of the Soviet threat in the document as "hyperbolic" and a precursor to contemporary rhetoric on the "war on terror". He claims the language "blurred important distinctions, distorted priorities and complicated threat perception."

== Conclusion ==
This document is critical to understanding the Cold War with its effect on similar national security pronouncements such as President George W. Bush's announcement of a "war on terror" in September 2001 and the National Security Strategy document of 2002. It is not only related to documents such as the National Security Strategy March 2005, but also provides insight to current US foreign policy. Implementation of NSC 68 shows the extent to which it marked a 'shift' in US policy—not only toward the USSR, but toward all communist governments. By signing the document, Truman provided a clearly defined and coherent US policy that did not really exist previously. Furthermore, it can be argued that NSC 68, as proposed by the council, addressed Truman's problem of being attacked from the right following the "red scare" and Alger Hiss case. Although not made public, NSC 68 was manifested in subsequent increases in America's conventional and nuclear capabilities, thereby adding to the country's financial burden. While NSC 68 did not make any specific recommendations regarding the proposed increase in defense expenditures, the Truman Administration almost tripled defense spending as a percentage of the gross domestic product between 1950 and 1953 (from 5 to 14.2 percent).

== See also ==
- Containment
- Détente
- NSC 162/2
- Rollback
- National security directive
