= Arthur S. Link =

American historian

Arthur Stanley Link (August 8, 1920 in New Market, Virginia – March 26, 1998 in Advance, North Carolina) was an American historian and educator, known as the leading authority on U.S. President Woodrow Wilson.

== Early life ==
Born in New Market, Virginia, 50 miles from Wilson's birthplace, in Staunton, Virginia, to a Lutheran minister of German descent, Link graduated from the University of North Carolina at Chapel Hill, receiving a B.A. in 1941 and a Ph.D. in 1945. He got inspired to look into the career of Woodrow Wilson by Fletcher Green, one of his professors.

== Career ==
Although his early writings were critical of Wilson for demanding overly-harsh reparations from a defeated Germany after World War I, Link grew to love him. He became the leading specialist on Wilson, published a five-volume biography (to the start of the First World War) (out of eight originally planned). He directed the project to edit the papers of Wilson, and served as the documentary editor for all 69 published volumes. Link was unable to finish his biography of Wilson because editing the papers took up too much of his time.

Link's first major scholarly contribution was to stress the importance of Progressivism in the South, a theme later developed by C. Vann Woodward, and the importance of the South to Progressive Era nationally. Link saw Wilson as a southerner with a southern base, who thus broadened the scope of the politics of Progressivism.

The second was to locate the heart of Progressivism in Theodore Roosevelt's New Nationalism platform of 1912.

The third was to argue that Progressivism collapsed after World War I because of internecine conflicts among reformers and uncertainties about how to pursue their agendas further. The Progressives ran out of ideas and so left the field to Warren G. Harding. Still, Link also argued that Progressivism was stronger in the 1920s than was generally acknowledged and that its underground currents formed the heart of the New Deal in the 1930s.

As Link delved into the manuscripts, he changed his mind but usually did not try to rewrite his books. The one exception was Woodrow Wilson: Revolution, War, and Peace (1979) (a revision of Wilson the Diplomatist). Link softened his criticism of Wilson's responses to the Mexican Revolution and German submarine warfare and also gave Wilson higher marks than before as a war leader and articulator of war aims in the Fourteen Points. Link had previously stated that Wilson would have taken the same unbending stand against ratification of the Versailles Treaty with Henry Cabot Lodge's reservations if he had enjoyed perfect health.

In Link's revision, he stressed Wilson's deteriorating cardiovascular condition and massive stroke. His medical deterioration made it hard for Wilson to compromise with Lodge and caused, in part, Wilson's earlier actions at the Versailles Peace Conference and his dealings with the US Senate over the treaty. Link incorporated his new ideas in elaborate notes in his edition of the Papers. The book is an attempt at a refutation of George F. Kennan's American Diplomacy (1951).

Link taught at Northwestern University (1949–1960) and Princeton University (1945–1949 and 1958–1992). He directed numerous PhD dissertations, including those of George McGovern (who worked on Colorado mine workers during 1910s), William Harbaugh (who worked on Theodore Roosevelt) and Gerald Grob (who studied mental health). His relations with his colleagues at Princeton were sometimes strained, as with Eric F. Goldman. At one point, Link was attacked by some scholars for his medical interpretation of Wilson, and Princeton University and the funding agencies seemed unsupportive, which caused the long relationship to end on a sour note in 1949.

Princeton did not eagerly invite his return in 1958, but the Woodrow Wilson Foundation insisted on it as a condition for financing The Papers of Woodrow Wilson.

According to his obituary in The New York Times by Michael T. Kaufman:

"Day after day, year after year since 1958, Mr. Link would rise at 5:30 in the morning and search for, read and assess hundreds of thousands of documents that would eventually fill the volumes that Princeton University Press published at $65 each. Princeton has sold almost 100,000 of them, an extraordinary number for this sort of work. At his desk, the same one that Wilson had used when he was president of Princeton, Professor Link wrote each of the long footnotes that explained the context of a particular letter or document, linking it to material that came before or would come later."

Link was distant from the administration and faculty but enjoyed working with undergraduates. His star pupil at Princeton University was Bill Bradley and at Northwestern University was George McGovern, who wrote labor history and was supported by Link during his 1972 Democratic candidate for president. Future Princeton, New Jersey mayor Phyllis Marchand, who worked for him as an indexer, noted that he rejected the idea of using computers and preferred index cards and a typewriter.

Link served as president of the American Historical Association, the Organization of American Historians, and the Southern Historical Association. In 1958–1958, he served as the Harold Vyvyan Harmsworth Professor of American History at Oxford University. He published 30 books, including history textbooks, and was the recipient of numerous awards, including 10 honorary degrees and two Bancroft Prizes. He was an elected member of both the American Philosophical Society and the American Academy of Arts and Sciences. An active Presbyterian, he served as vice-president of the National Council of Churches of Christ in America. When not doing history, he enjoyed reading and rereading the novels of Anthony Trollope.

== Personal life ==
He married Margaret Douglas Link (d. 1996) in 1945; they had four children, William A. Link (a historian), Dr. A. Stanley Link Jr. of Winston-Salem, N.C., and James Douglas Link of Flemington, N.J.; a daughter, Margaret Link Weil of Chapel Hill, N.C.; and four grandchildren.

== Death ==
Link died of lung cancer in Advance, North Carolina, at the age of 77.

== Notable quotations ==
- "I've read a lot of history in my life, and I think that aside from St. Paul, Jesus and the great religious prophets, Woodrow Wilson was the most admirable character I've ever encountered in history."
- "Most of the Hitler and Stalin scholars I know are depressed people."

== Works ==
- Wilson, a biography in 5 volumes (Princeton, N.J.: Princeton University Press). Volume I: "The Road to the White House, 570 pages (1947); Volume II: "The New Freedom", 504 pages (1956) (Bancroft Prize); Volume III: "The Struggle for Neutrality", 733 pages (1960); Volume IV: "Confusions and Crises, 1915–1916", 386 pages (1964); Volume V: "Campaigns for Progressivism and Peace, 1916–1917", 464 pages (1965) (ISBN 978-0-691-04576-4) online copies.
- Woodrow Wilson, A Selected Bibliography of His Published Writings, Addresses and Public Papers (Princeton: Princeton University Press, 1948).
- Woodrow Wilson and the Progressive Era, 1910–1917 (New York: Harper & Brothers, 1954). read online
- American Epoch: A History of the United States Since the 1890s (New York: Knopf, 1955), textbook
- Wilson the Diplomatist: A Look at His Major Foreign Policies, New Viewpoints, (Baltimore; Johns Hopkins Press, 1957)
- "What Happened to the Progressive Movement in the 1920's?" The American Historical Review, Vol. 64, No. 4 (Jul., 1959), pp. 833–851 JSTOR 1905118
- Wilson: The Struggle for Neutrality, 1914–1915 (Princeton, N.J.: Princeton University Press, 1960). (Bancroft Prize)
- Our American Republic (Boston: Ginn, 1963).
- editor, The Papers of Woodrow Wilson (Princeton, N.J.: Princeton University Press), 69 volumes, 1966–1983
  - v. 1. 1856–1880—v. 2. 1881–1884—v. 3. 1884–1885—v. 4. 1885—v. 5. 1885–1888—v. 6. 1888–1890—v. 7. 1890–1892—v. 8. 1892–1894—v. 9. 1894–1896—v. 10. 1896–1898—v. 11. 1898–1900—v. 12. 1900–1902—v. 13. Contents and index, vols. 1 to 12, 1856–1902—v. 14. 1902–1903—v. 15. 1903–1905—v. 16. 1905–1907—v. 17. 1907–1908—v. 18. 1908–1909—v. 19. 1909–1910—v. 20–21. 1910—v. 22. 1910–1911—v. 23. 1911–1912—v. 24–25. 1912—v. 26. Contents and index, vols. 14–25, 1902–1912—v. 27–28. 1913—v. 29. 1913–1914—v. 30–31. 1914—v. 32–34. 1915—v. 35. 1915–1916—v. 36–38. 1916—v. 40. 1916–1917—v. 41–44. 1917—v. 45. 1917–1918—v. 46–48. 1918—v. 50. The complete press conferences, 1913–1919—v. 51. 1918—v. 52. Index, 1916–1918—v. 53. 1918–1919—v. 54–63. 1919—v. 64. 1919–1920—v. 65–66. 1920—v. 67. 1920–1922—v. 68. 1922–1924.
- The Impact of World War I (ed.) (New York: Harper & Row, 1969).
- The Diplomacy of World Power: The United States, 1889–1920, edited by Arthur S. Link and William M. Leary, Jr. (London: Edward Arnold, 1970.)
- The Democratic Heritage: A History of the United States (with Stanley Coben) (Waltham, Mass.: Ginn, 1971).
- The Higher Realism of Woodrow Wilson, and Other Essays, with a foreword by Dewey W. Grantham. (Nashville: Vanderbilt University Press, 1971).
- Problems in American History, edited by Richard W. Leopold, Arthur S. Link, and Stanley Coben. 4th ed. 2 vols. (Englewood Cliffs, N.J., Prentice-Hall, 1972).
- The Age of Franklin D. Roosevelt, 1921–1945 (with William B. Catton). 4th ed. (New York: Knopf; distributed by Random House, 1973).
- The Era of the Cold War, 1946–1973, by Arthur S. Link and William B. Catton. 4th ed. (New York, Knopf; distributed by Random House, 1974).
- Woodrow Wilson: Revolution, War, and Peace (Arlington Heights, Ill.: H. Davidson, 1979) (ISBN 978-0-88295-799-9) read online
- An Era of Economic Change, Reform, and World Wars, 1900–1945 (with William B. Catton), maps and charts by Theodore R. Miller. 5th ed. (New York: Knopf: distributed by Random House, 1980).
- Woodrow Wilson and a Revolutionary World, 1913–1921 (ed.). (Chapel Hill: University of North Carolina Press, 1982).
- Progressivism (with Richard L. McCormick). (Arlington Heights, Ill.: Harlan Davidson, 1983). read online
- The Twentieth Century: An American History (with William A. Link). (Arlington Heights, Ill.: Harlan Davidson, 1983).
- The American Historical Association, 1884–1984: Retrospect and Prospect (Presidential Address to the American Historical Association, December 28, 1984) read online
- The Wilson Era: Essays in Honor of Arthur S. Link, edited by John Milton Cooper, Jr. and Charles E. Neu. (Arlington Heights, Ill.: Harlan Davidson, 1991).
- The Real Woodrow Wilson: An Interview with Arthur S. Link, editor of the Wilson Papers, by James Robert Carroll. 1st ed. (Bennington, Vt.: Images from the Past, 2001).

== Sources ==
- John Milton Cooper, Jr., "Arthur S. Link", in Robert Allen Rutland, ed. Clio's Favorites: Leading Historians of the United States, 1945–2000, U of Missouri Press (2000), pp 111–125. online edition
- John Milton Cooper, Jr. and Charles E. Neu, eds. The Wilson era: essays in honor of Arthur S. Link, 1991.
- William A. Link, Links: My Family in American History, University Press of Florida, 2012.
