= Nicholas Thompson (editor) =

American media executive

- Thompson at the 2026 Status Summit
- Born: 1975 (age 50–51); United States
- Education: Stanford University
- Occupation: Executive officer
- Years active: 1999–present
- Organization: The Atlantic
- Website: nickthompson.com

Nicholas Thompson (born 1975) is an American journalist, author, and media executive. He has been the CEO of the American magazine The Atlantic since February 2021. Thompson previously worked as editor-in-chief of Wired and The New Yorker’s website. He is the author of two non-fiction books, is a contributor for CBS News, and regularly appears on CBS This Morning and CBSN.

== Early life and education ==
Thompson is the son of W. Scott Thompson and Nina Nitze. His father was a former professor of Southeast Asian studies and a member of both the Ford and Reagan presidential administrations. Thompson grew up in Chestnut Hill, Massachusetts and went to high school at Phillips Academy in Andover.

He attended Stanford University where he wrote for the Stanford Daily and founded a student newspaper, The Thinker. In 1996, he was awarded a Harry S. Truman Scholarship. Upon receiving the scholarship, Thompson said that his interest was in "help[ing] create links between environmentalists and businesspeople." Thompson graduated Phi Beta Kappa in 1997 with honors and with degrees in Earth Systems, Political Science, and Economics.

== Career ==
After college, Thompson briefly worked at CBS as an associate producer before being fired on his first day, as someone believed he was too inexperienced. Without other plans, he traveled to Africa, where he was kidnapped in Morocco by drug dealers immediately upon landing. The daylong experience led Thompson to publish his first professional story, a piece in The Washington Post titled "Continental Drift."

When he came back to the U.S., Thompson worked as a freelance journalist and as a street musician in New York City, frequently performing on the 14th Street L train platform at Sixth Avenue. He was then hired at Penguin Computing, a Linux hardware company in San Francisco, but he made the transition back to journalism when he was hired as an editor of the Washington Monthly in 1999. Thompson worked at Washington Monthly for two years, One of his most prominent stories was a piece that exposed fraud in the U.S. News & World Report college rankings. Following another stint as a freelance reporter in Africa, Thompson was hired as a senior editor at Legal Affairs.

In 2005, Thompson was about to start law school at NYU when he instead joined Wired as a senior editor. While at Wired, Thompson assigned and edited the feature story "The Great Escape," which was part of the basis for the film Argo. He also edited Evan Ratliff's piece "Vanish", which was an interactive digital manhunt in which Ratliff tried to disappear with no digital record and challenged readers to track him down, all in an attempt to figure out how difficult it would be to "vanish in the digital age." The winner would walk away with $5000 and a photo in Wired, and Thompson's job was to slowly parcel out information on Ratliff.

Thompson, Ratliff, and Jefferson Rabb co-founded the multimedia magazine and software company Atavist in 2011. In 2018, they sold Atavist to Automattic, the parent company of WordPress.

In 2010, Thompson was hired as a senior editor at The New Yorker. From 2012 to 2017, Thompson served as the editor of the magazine's website. In that time, the number of monthly readers increased seven-fold. He also led the redesign and re-platforming of the site, the launch of The New Yorker Today app, and the introduction of a metered paywall. By the time the metered paywall was introduced months later, new subscription sign-ups were 85 percent higher than they had been the previous January. Thompson also wrote for the magazine, most notably a piece on his long friendship with Joseph Stalin's daughter.

Thompson at the 2022 Web Summit

In 2017, Thompson returned to Wired as its fifth editor-in-chief. Under his leadership, Wired launched a paywall, won the National Magazine Award for design and photography and was nominated for general excellence. Thompson took an evolved approach to the magazine's editorial mission, as Wired was once an optimistic advocate for the tech industry.

As editor-in-chief, Thompson continued writing and reporting. In February 2018, he co-wrote Wired's cover story "Inside the Two Years that Shook Facebook—and the World," an 11,000-word investigation based on reporting with more than fifty current and former Facebook employees. He also wrote stories about Instagram's machine learning, the rising tensions between the US and China over artificial intelligence, how technology helped him run a faster marathon at age 43, and his personal relationship to running. In 2020, Thompson authored a viral story about an unidentified, deceased hiker known to others as "Mostly Harmless." Mostly Harmless was identified in January 2021, and Thompson penned a follow-up piece in the aftermath.

Thompson became CEO of The Atlantic magazine in 2021. Under his leadership, the company grew at its fastest rate and has reached the highest number of subscribers in its 167-year history. In March, the company announced it was profitable. During Thompson's time, the publication has won three National Magazine Awards for General Excellence, three Pulitzer Prizes, and been named Digiday's Publisher of the Year.

In 2009, Thompson published his first book, The Hawk and the Dove: Paul Nitze, George Kennan, and the History of the Cold War, a historical book detailing the career and life of American diplomat George Kennan and of Thompson's maternal grandfather, arms negotiator Paul Nitze.

In 2018, he was named one of LinkedIn's top voices alongside Richard Branson, Melinda Gates, and Justin Trudeau.

In 2026, he was included in leaked lists of members in Peter Thiel's exclusive club, Dialog. He declined comment.

== Running ==
Thompson competed in running as both a high school student and briefly on his college team at Stanford. In 2021, Thompson set the American 45-49 age-group record at the 50-kilometer distance after running 3:04:36 at the Brooks Row River 50K in Oregon. As of 2025, he had completed the New York City Marathon 12 times, running his fastest time of 2:29 at the age of 44.

In 2025, Thompson released a memoir titled The Running Ground, exploring his relationship with running and with his father.

== Personal life ==
As of 2018 Thompson is married with sons. His wife is a dance professor at The New School in New York.

== Bibliography ==
=== Books ===
- Thompson, Nicholas (2009). The Hawk and the Dove.
- Thompson, Nicholas (2025). The Running Ground.

=== Essays and reporting ===
- Thompson, Nicholas (March 31, 2014). "My friend, Stalin's daughter". Personal History. The New Yorker. Vol. 90, no. 6. pp. 30–37.
- Thompson, Nicholas (March 23, 2015). "Coin drop". The Talk of the Town. The New Yorker. Vol. 91, no. 5. p. 38.
- Thompson, Nicholas (February 12, 2018). "Inside the two years that shook Facebook—and the world". Wired.
- Thompson, Nicholas (August 14, 2017). "Instagram's CEO Wants to Clean Up the Internet—But Is That a Good @$ing Idea?". Wired.
- Thompson, Nicholas (November 2, 2018). "An Aging Marathoner Tries to Run Fast After 40". Wired.
- Thompson, Nicholas (October 23, 2018). "The AI Cold War With China That Threatens Us All". Wired.
- Thompson, Nicholas (April 20, 2020). "To Run My Best Marathon at Age 44, I Had to Outrun My Past". Wired.
- Thompson, Nicholas (November 2, 2020). "A Nameless Hiker and the Case the Internet Can't Crack". Wired.
- Thompson, Nicholas (January 12, 2021). "The Unsettling Truth About the 'Mostly Harmless' Hiker". Wired.
