= The Hawk and the Dove (book) =

2009 book by Nicholas Thompson

The Hawk and the Dove: Paul Nitze, George Kennan, and the History of the Cold War
- Author: Nicholas Thompson
- Language: English
- Publisher: Henry Holt and Co.
- Publication date: September 15, 2009
- ISBN: 978-0-8050-8142-8

The Hawk and the Dove: Paul Nitze, George Kennan, and the History of the Cold War is Nicholas Thompson's first book. The Hawk and The Dove was published on September 15, 2009, by Henry Holt and Company. The book focuses on the relationship between Paul Nitze and George Kennan, two highly influential Americans with extremely different positions on the Cold War. Nitze, the hawk, was a consummate insider who believed that the best way to avoid a nuclear clash was to prepare to win one. Kennan, the dove, was a diplomat turned academic whose famous X Article persuasively argued that the United States should contain the Soviet Union while waiting for it to collapse from within.
