= Arthur Link =

Arthur Link may refer to:

- Arthur A. Link (1914–2010), Governor of North Dakota
- Arthur S. Link (1920–1998), American historian
