= Robert F. Kelley =

American government official (1894-1986)

Robert F. Kelley (February 13, 1894 – 1976) was an adamantly anticommunist US State Department official who influenced a generation of Russian specialists such as George F. Kennan and Charles Bohlen. He was born in Somerville, Massachusetts. He received a BA from Harvard in 1915 and an MA in 1917 and continued with postgraduate work at the University of Paris (Sorbonne). Kelley served in the US Army during World War I. In 1922 he joined the State Department and, in 1926, became the head of the newly created Division of Eastern European Affairs.

Kelley was responsible for the hard-line anti-Soviet attitude of the State Department before and after the recognition of Russia in 1933. Kelley was concerned about the speed with which nonrecognition ended and urged Secretary of State Cordell Hull and President Franklin Roosevelt not to trust Soviet promises about resolving outstanding issues. None of his concerns were ever resolved. Kelley came under scrutiny and was eventually removed from his position after proponents of a more conciliatory line towards Russia moved against him and the Eastern European Division. Kelley left the State Department in 1945 to join a private organization that eventually sponsored Radio Liberty, an anti-Soviet broadcasting service.
