= A National Strategic Narrative =

2011 United States strategy document

The front cover of the Narrative.

A National Strategic Narrative is a United States strategy document.

== Background ==
In 2009, during a strategy brief to Secretary of Defense Robert Gates, Captain Wayne Porter (US Navy) noted the lack of a United States grand strategy, which could act as a guide or inspiration for all strategies of the US government. Admiral Michael Mullen, then Chairman of the Joint Chiefs of Staff, charged Captain Porter with writing such a grand strategy. Concurrently, Colonel Mark "Puck" Mykleby (US Marine Corps) and the strategy team at USSOCOM were developing some of the baseline concepts that are reflected in the Narrative. The two strategists, Porter and Mykleby, teamed up and worked for years towards developing such a grand strategy. The product was published on April 8, 2011, by the Woodrow Wilson International Center for Scholars. The 15 page article was titled A National Strategic Narrative by Mr. Y (a pseudonym for Captain Porter and Colonel Mykleby, reminiscent of the X Article which helped galvanize U.S. consensus on Containment of the Soviet Union from the 1940s up until the collapse of the Soviet Union decades later). Included in the 15 pages is a preface by Anne-Marie Slaughter, Professor of Politics and International Affairs at Princeton University.

== Summary ==
The preface provides a frame of reference and covers key themes of the article. Slaughter leads the reader from the strategic narrative of the Cold War which "was that the United States was the leader of the free world against the communist world; that we would invest in containing the Soviet Union and limiting its expansion while building a dynamic economy and as just, and prosperous a society as possible". She then sums up the proposed strategic narrative of the United States of the 21st century, in which "we want to become the strongest competitor and most influential player in a deeply inter-connected global system, which requires that we invest less in defense and more in sustainable prosperity and the tools of effective global engagement". Slaughter goes on to discuss the five major transitions in the global system that the Narrative responds to. They are: 1) From control in a closed system to credible influence in an open system. 2) From containment to sustainment. 3) From deterrence and defense to civilian engagement and competition. 4) From zero sum to positive sum global politics/economics. 5) From national security to national prosperity and security.

The Narrative itself begins with stating the intent of the document and an overview of the themes to be discussed, including actionable solutions. The body of the article is divided into sections, which are titled as follows: From Containment to Sustainment: Control to Credible Influence, Our Values and Enduring National Interest, Our Three Investment Priorities, Fair Competition and Deterrence, A Strategic Ecology, Closing the “Say-do” Gap - the Negative Aspects of “Binning", Credible Influence in a Strategic Ecosystem, Opportunities beyond Threat and Risk, A National Prosperity and Security Act, and A Beacon of Hope, a Pathway of Promise. The authors determine that the enduring national interests are prosperity and security, which are underpinned, empowered and constrained by American values. An ultimately positive and nonpartisan focus on opportunity (embodied by the youth of the nation) and downplaying the centrality of risks and threats in strategic policy making, has resonated with a wider and wider audience in America and abroad.

== Authors ==
The men behind Mr Y, Porter and Mykleby, have spoken at numerous events, contributed various articles, and worked with different organizations to spread the message of the Narrative and put it into action. Such organizations include Sandia National Laboratories, New America Foundation, and the Naval Postgraduate School. The authors actively push for a fundamental review of American grand strategy at the highest level, similar to the Solarium project under the Eisenhower administration. In May 2012, both halves of Mr. Y were recognized with the Ellis Island Award.

== Impact ==
Though only published in 2011 and relatively young as a National Grand Strategy (compared to the decades-long approach it proposes), the Narrative has already been the subject of much attention inside and outside of the United States government. The parallels between the Narrative and key themes of the 2012 State of the Union Address have been noted by some as signs of the growing influence of the Narrative. The growing popular support for the Narrative can be observed in a wide range of expressions, from fan pages to ring tones. The Narrative, or further related work by the authors, have been featured in various publications, to include the Journal of American Foreign Policy. In cooperation with the authors, a website has been established at nationalstrategicnarrative.org/
