= X Article =

1947 anti-communist article by American diplomat George F. Kennan

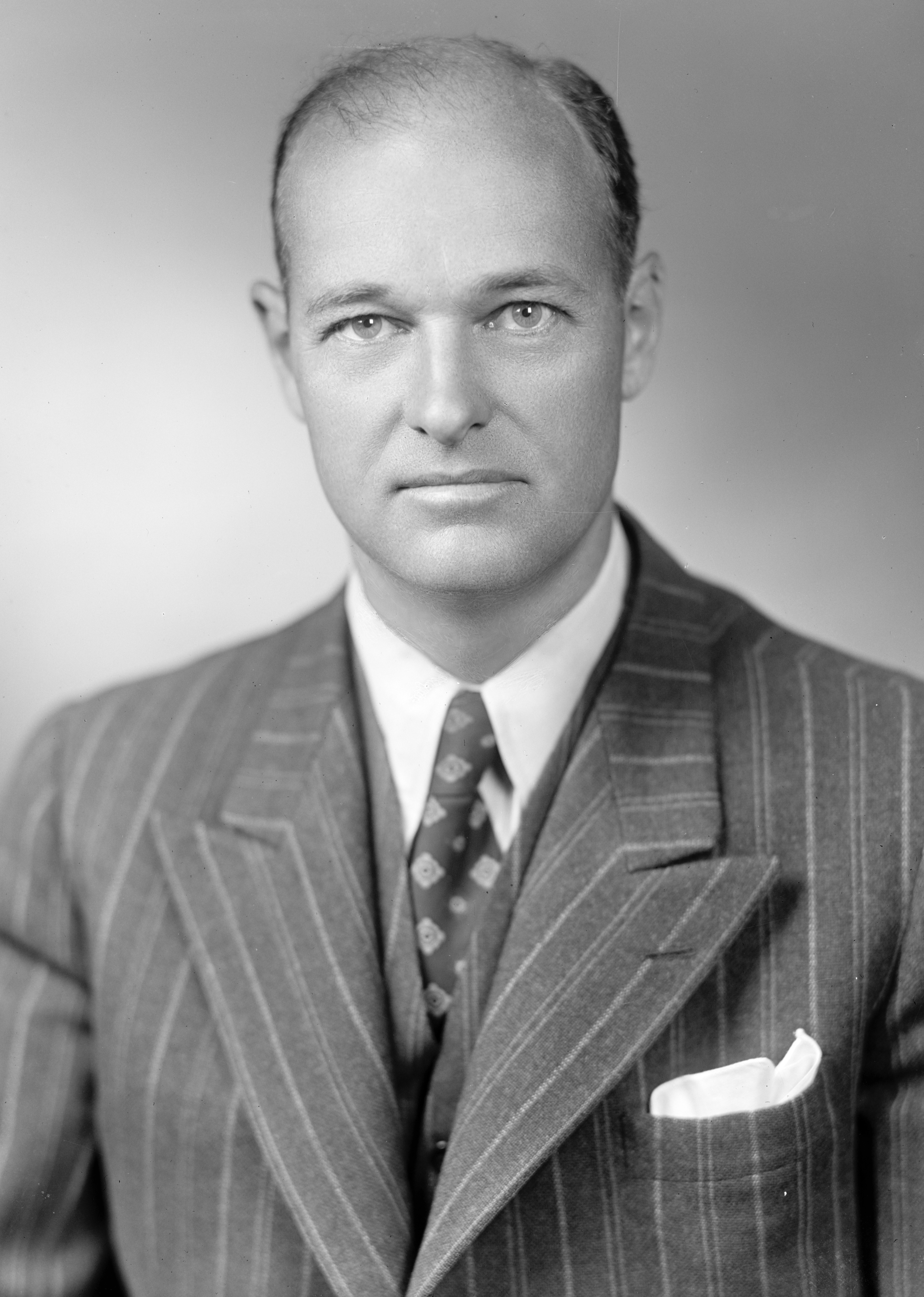
George F. Kennan in 1947, the same year Foreign Affairs published his piece "The Sources of Soviet Conduct" under the pseudonym "X"

"The Sources of Soviet Conduct", commonly "X Article", is an article written by George F. Kennan and published under the pseudonym "X" in the July 1947 issue of Foreign Affairs magazine. It introduced the term "containment" to widespread use and advocated the strategic use of that concept against the Soviet Union. It expanded on ideas expressed by Kennan in a confidential February 1946 telegram, formally identified by Kennan's State Department number, "511", but informally dubbed the "long telegram" for its size.

Kennan composed the long telegram in response to inquiries about the implications of a February 1946 speech by Joseph Stalin. (Note: In Kennan's memoirs, he writes that the telegram was a reply to the Treasury Department's "anguished cry of bewilderment" at the Soviet Union's refusal to join the International Monetary Fund and World Bank, despite having participated in the Bretton Woods Conference organizing both institutions. The historian John Lewis Gaddis provided the same explanation in his earliest books and lectures, including in his 1997 book We Now Know, but in his 2011 biography of Kennan he instead described this explanation as an "error"; Kennan provided a separate explainer on the Soviet refusal to join the IMF and World Bank in January 1946, before he published the "long telegram" in February.) Though the speech was in line with previous statements by Stalin, it provoked fear in the American press and public; Time magazine called it "the most warlike pronouncement uttered by any top-rank statesman since V-J Day". The long telegram explained Soviet motivations by recounting the history of Russian rulers as well as the ideology of Marxism–Leninism. It argued that the Soviet leaders used the ideology to characterize the external world as hostile, allowing them to justify their continued hold on power despite a lack of popular support. Washington bureaucrats quickly read the confidential message and accepted it as the best explanation of Soviet behavior. The reception elevated Kennan's reputation within the State Department as one of the government's foremost Soviet experts.

After hearing Kennan speak about Soviet foreign relations at the Council on Foreign Relations in January 1947, international banker R. Gordon Wasson suggested that he share his views in an article for Foreign Affairs. Kennan revised a piece he had submitted to Secretary of the Navy James Forrestal in late January 1947, but his role in government precluded him from publishing under his name. His superiors granted him approval to publish the piece provided it was released anonymously; Foreign Affairs attributed the article only to "X". Expressing similar sentiments to that of the long telegram, the piece was strong in its anti-communism, introducing and outlining a basic theory of containment. The article was widely read; though it does not mention the Truman Doctrine, having mostly been written before Truman's speech, it quickly became seen as an expression of the doctrine's policy. Retrospective commentators dispute the impact of the article, although Henry Kissinger referred to it as "the diplomatic doctrine of the era".

== Background ==
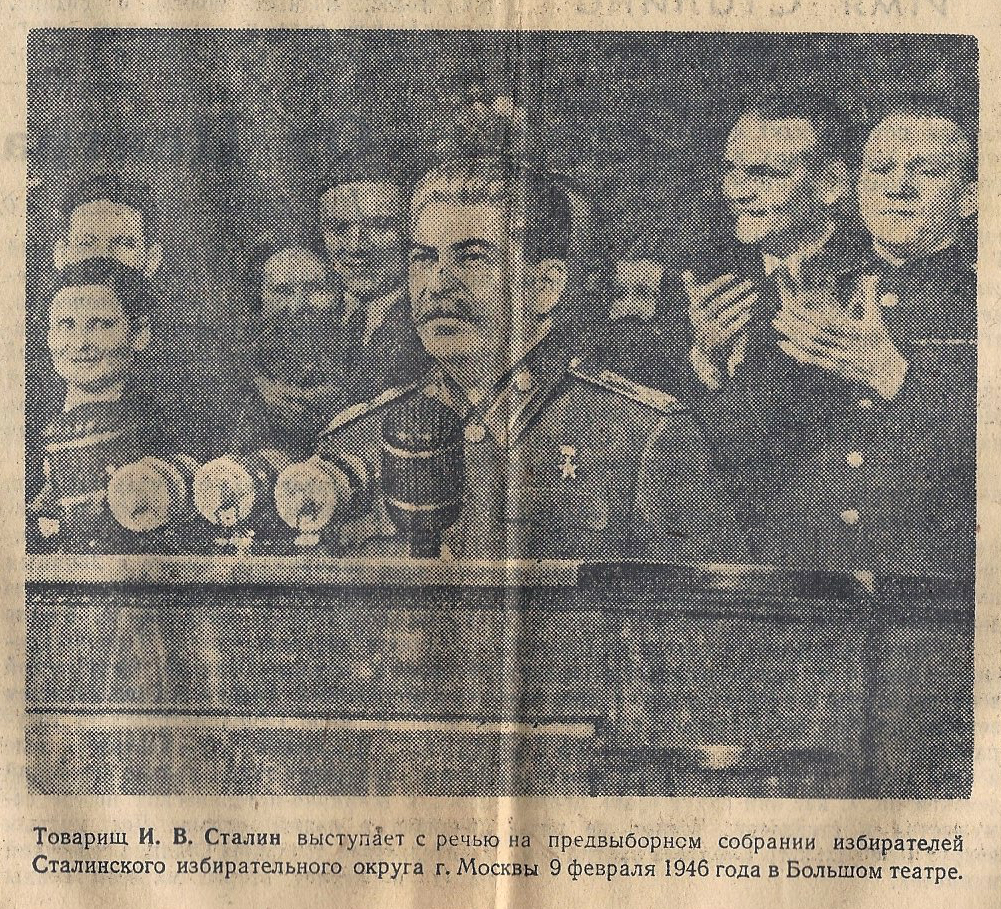
Kennan's long telegram began as an analysis of Joseph Stalin's speech at the Bolshoi Theatre on February 9, 1946 (pictured).

Joseph Stalin, General Secretary and de facto leader of the Soviet Union, spoke at the Bolshoi Theatre on February 9, 1946, the night before the symbolic 1946 Supreme Soviet election. The speech did not discuss foreign policy, but instead made pledges to expand industry. He justified the expansion by pointing to Marxist–Leninist theory, warning that capitalism possessed a predisposition towards conflict.

Stalin's speech provoked fear in the American press and public, with Time magazine calling it "the most warlike pronouncement uttered by any top-rank statesman since V-J Day." George F. Kennan, then working for the US State Department as chargé d'affaires in Moscow, found the speech routine and reflective of previous statements from Stalin. With this in mind, he issued only a quick summary of the speech for the State Department. Despite the familiar statements from Stalin, the context in which they were made – including the Soviet Union's recent rejection of Bretton Woods and evidence of atomic espionage in the United States and Canada – alarmed officials in Washington. In a 1982 interview, former diplomat Elbridge Durbrow expressed that Stalin's speech had in effect said, "to hell with the rest of the world." US President Harry Truman was confused by the Soviet's policies, at times appearing belligerent and at others exercising self-restraint. Leaders were increasingly coming to the conclusion that the existing quid pro quo strategy was ineffective against the Soviets, but had no replacement strategy.

Durbrow and another diplomat, H. Freeman Matthews – both readers of Kennan's earlier telegrams – were confused by Kennan's relative silence about the speech. On 13 February, Matthews drafted a message, signed by Secretary of State James F. Byrnes, asking for an analysis. The message described the press and public's reaction having been, "to a degree not hitherto felt", and expressed: "We should welcome receiving from you an interpretive analysis of what we may expect in the way of future implementation of these announced policies." W. Averell Harriman, having recently returned from his ambassadorship to the Soviet Union, spoke to Kennan and encouraged him to write a thorough analysis.

== The "long telegram" ==
Kennan probably wrote rough drafts of a message before dictating a final version to his secretary, Dorothy Hessman, on February 22, 1946. Finishing late at night, he took the message to the Mokhovaya code room in Moscow and had it telegraphed back to Washington. The message was quickly dubbed the "long telegram" because, at a little over 5,000 words, it was the longest diplomatic telegram sent in the history of the State Department. (Note: In Kennan's memoirs, he incorrectly describes the telegram's length as "some eight thousand words". Gaddis provided the same length in his earliest books and lectures before correcting himself in his 2011 biography of Kennan.)

Identified as "511" by Kennan's State Department number, the message is divided into five sections, covering the Soviet Union's background, current features, future prospects and the implications these would have for the United States. Briefly apologizing for its length, Keenan opens the telegram by stressing the urgency of the current situation, stating that it is necessary to address the concerns described within simultaneously. Kennan begins by laying out the world from the Soviet perspective, splitting it into socialist and capitalist sectors. The alliance between the United States and Great Britain was destined to fail, and would either lead to war between them or a joint attack on the Soviet Union. The Soviets believed they would ultimately prevail in such a conflict, but would need to grow their strength and exploit the capitalists' tendency towards conflict amongst one another in the meantime. Kennan described these ideas as absurd, pointing out that capitalist countries were not failing and were not always in conflict. Further, he described the idea that the United States and Great Britain would deliberately enter into a war against the Soviets as the "sheerest nonsense".

Soviet policy will really be dominated by [the] pursuit of autarchy for [the] Soviet Union and Soviet-dominated adjacent areas taken together. ... [The Soviets are likely to turn] a cold official shoulder ... to the principle of general economic collaboration among nations.

— George F. Kennan, the "long telegram"

The Soviet leaders reached these illogical sentiments, he explained, because "... at the bottom of the Kremlin's view of world affairs is a traditional and instinctive Russian sense of insecurity." The authority of previous Russian rulers was "archaic in form, fragile and artificial in its psychological foundation, unable to stand comparison or contact with political systems of western countries". This understanding of Russian history was joined with the ideology of Marxism-Leninism. Their obstinacy in dealing with the West was born out of necessity; seeing the rest of the world as hostile provided an excuse "for the dictatorship without which they did not know how to rule, for cruelties they did not dare not to inflict, for sacrifices they felt bound to demand". Until the Soviet Union either experienced consistent failures or their leader was persuaded that they were negatively affecting their nation's interest, the West could not expect any reciprocity from the Soviets.

The Soviet government, Kennan continued, could be understood as occupying two distinct spaces: an official, visible government, and another operating without any official acknowledgement. While the former would participate in international diplomacy, the latter would attempt to undermine the capitalist nations as much as possible, including efforts to "disrupt national self confidence, to hamstring measures of national defense, to increase social and industrial unrest, to stimulate all forms of disunity." He opined that the Soviets ultimately have no expectation of reconciliation with the West.

Kennan concluded not by offering specific courses of action, but instead offered more general solutions, such as the necessity of maintaining courage and self-confidence in interactions with the Soviets. Managing the threat would require "the same thoroughness and care as solution of major strategic problem in war, and if necessary, with no smaller outlay in planning effort". He wrote that, compared to Nazi Germany, the Soviets are much more patient and often risk averse. Russia's being weaker than the West, not having regular procedures for replacing leaders, having absorbed too many territories, failing to inspire its people, and being overly reliant on negative propaganda, meant that "we may approach calmly and with good heart [the] problem of how to deal with Russia."

Kennan emphasized the need for educating the American public about the threat of international communism. Keeping Western society strong was important to ward off the expansive tendencies of communism: "The greatest danger that can befall us in coping with this problem of Soviet communism, is that we shall allow ourselves to become like those with whom we are coping."

== Impact of the "long telegram" ==
=== On American foreign policy ===
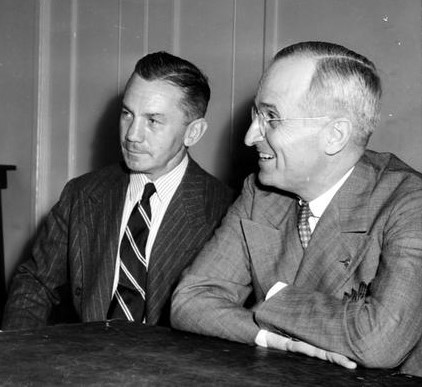
Secretary of the Navy James Forrestal (left) was largely responsible for the spread of the "long telegram", extending its readership to US President Harry S. Truman (right), amongst others.

Matthews sent Kennan a cable praising the telegram, describing it as "magnificent", adding, "I cannot overestimate its importance to those of us here struggling with the problem." Byrnes praised it as well, writing he had read it "with the greatest interest" and describing it as "a splendid analysis". Harriman was less enthused, calling it "fairly long, and a little bit slow reading in spots." He nonetheless sent a copy to Secretary of the Navy James Forrestal. Forrestal was largely responsible for the spread of the long telegram, sending copies across Washington. It gained a larger readership than was typical for a classified document, with readers including ambassador to Cuba Henry Norweb, British diplomat Frank Roberts, General George C. Marshall and President Truman.

The long telegram was quickly read and accepted by Washington bureaucrats as the best explanation of Soviet behavior. Policymakers, military officials and intelligence analysts generally came to understand that the Soviet Union's primary foreign policy goal was world domination under a Communist state. Historian John Lewis Gaddis writes that the ultimate impact of the long telegram is that it "became the basis for United States strategy toward the Soviet Union throughout the rest of the Cold War", and that it "won [Kennan] the reputation of being the government's foremost Soviet expert". In 1967, Kennan reflected "My reputation was made. My voice now carried." In mid-April 1946, at Forrestal's insistence, Kennan received an appointment to the National War College as Deputy for Foreign Affairs.

The Truman administration quickly accepted Kennan's conclusion that the Soviets had no reasonable grievances with the West and would never cooperate with capitalist states. It was therefore senseless to try and address Soviet concerns, leaving a policy of containing Soviet interests as the best response. Historian Louis Halle writes that the timing of the long telegram's appearance was important, "[coming] right at a time when the Department ... was floundering about, looking for new intellectual moorings." He continues that the telegram served as "a new and realistic conception to which it might attach itself." Gaddis and historian Wilson D. Miscamble both believe that Halle overstates Kennan's impact on State Department thinking, emphasizing that the Department was already moving towards a more adversarial position against the Soviets, though Miscamble concedes, "there can be no doubt that Kennan's cable exercised a catalytic effect upon departmental thinking especially as regards the possibility of the United States achieving any non-adversary relationship with the Soviet Union."

If none of my previous literary efforts had seemed to evoke even the faintest tinkle from the bell at which they were aimed, this one, to my astonishment, struck it squarely and set it vibrating with a resonance that was not to die down for many months.

— Kennan reflecting on the long telegram, 1967

Offering a different perspective, Matthews notes in a letter of March 12, 1946, that the administration had already moved in the direction of not catering to Soviet interests before the long telegram, pointing to a speech Byrnes delivered on 28 February, drafted before Byrnes had read Kennan's message. In the speech, Byrnes explains: "We will not and we cannot stand aloof if force or threat is used contrary to the purposes of the [United Nations] Charter. ... If we are to be a great power we must act as a great power, not only in order to ensure our own security but in order to preserve the peace of the world." Matthews explains that long telegram would instead serve as the administration's rationale for subsequent actions. (Note: In the same letter, Matthews writes that the long telegram is "to my mind the finest piece of analytical writing that I have ever seen come out of the [Foreign] Service ..., [it] has been received in the highest quarters here as a basic outline of future Soviet policy." He counts among its reader the Secretaries of State, War and Navy, and those highest in the Army and Navy.) Historian Melvyn P. Leffler points out that before the long telegram had circulated widely, the Joint Chiefs of Staff had already resolved in February 1946 that "collaboration with the Soviet Union should stop short not only of compromise of principle but also of expansion of Russian influence in Europe and in the Far East.

=== On the Soviet Union ===
Though the long telegram was a classified document, it circulated widely enough that a copy leaked out to Soviet intelligence. Stalin was among its readers and called on his American ambassador, Nikolai Novikov, to send a similar telegram from Washington to Moscow. Ghostwritten by Soviet Foreign Minister Vyacheslav Molotov, the piece was sent on September 27, 1946. Representative of Stalin's opinions, Novikov's telegram argued in part: "The foreign policy of the United States reflects the imperialistic tendencies of American monopolistic capitalism, [and] is characterized ... by a striving for world supremacy." America would attempt to achieve supremacy by cooperating with Great Britain, but their cooperation was "plagued with great internal contradictions and cannot be lasting ... It is quite possible that the Near East will become a center of Anglo-American contradictions that will explode the agreements now reached between the United States and England."

Kennan provided commentary on Novikov's telegram in a 1991 piece for the journal Diplomatic History. He wrote in part, "These poor people, put on the spot, produced the thing," but "it was only a way of saying to their masters in Moscow: 'How true, sir!'".

== Foreign Affairs article ==
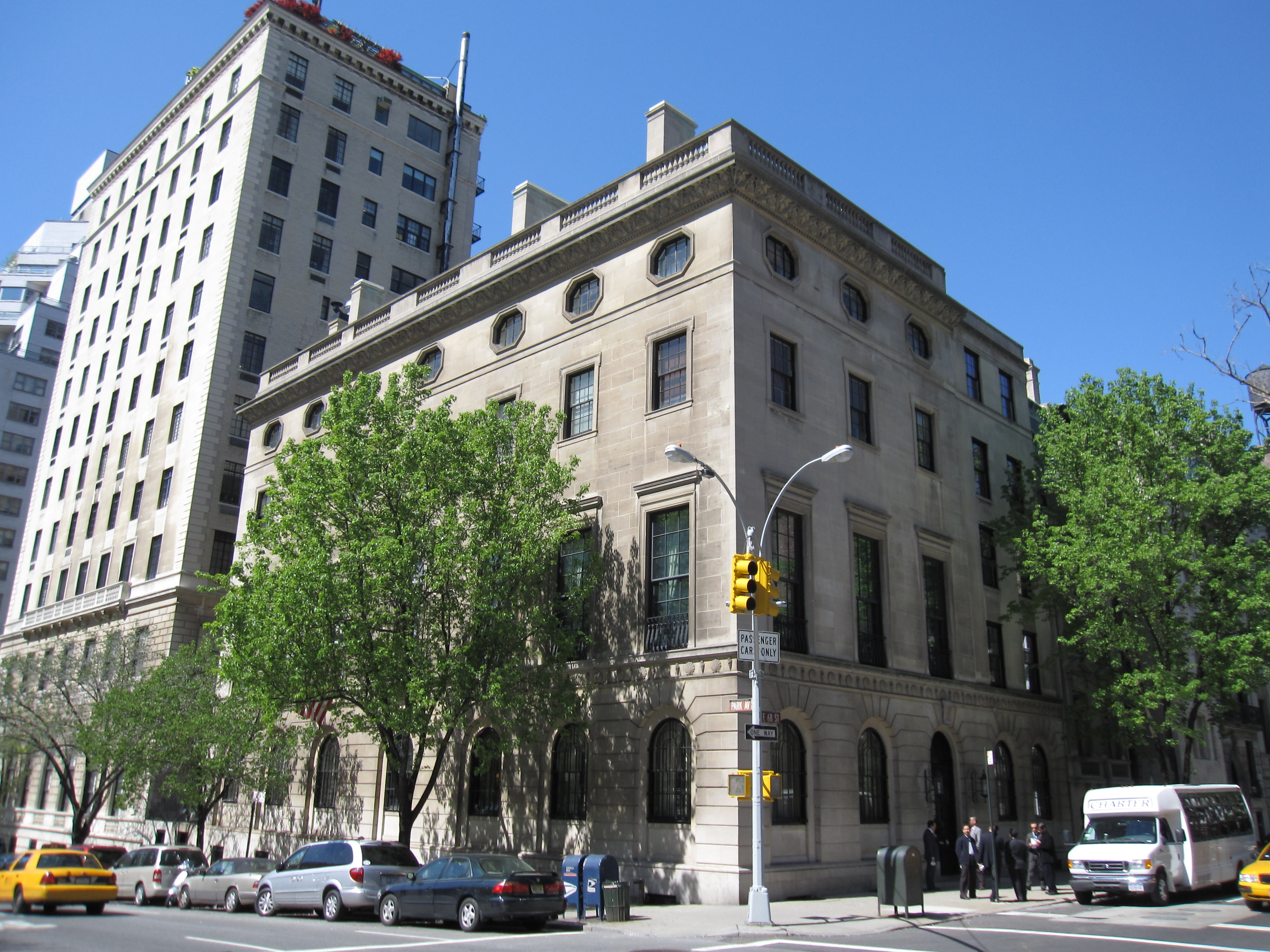
R. Gordon Wasson encouraged Kennan to write an article for Foreign Affairs after hearing him speak to the Council on Foreign Relations at the Harold Pratt House (pictured) in January 1947.

=== Origins ===
On January 7, 1947, Kennan spoke at the Council on Foreign Relations, based at the Harold Pratt House in New York City. The theme of the meeting was "Soviet Foreign Relations", presented to a small group and designated as "not for attribution". Kennan did not prepare a written speech, having given dozens of similar talks in the years before. In his talk, he discussed the Soviet leaders' perspectives on the rest of the world, rooted in both their Marxist-Leninist ideology and Russian history. The Soviets justified their dictatorship by pointing to external enemies, most of which were imaginary. For change to occur, the United States and its allies would need to "contain" the Soviets in a "non-provocative way".

International banker R. Gordon Wasson attended the discussion and was impressed by Kennan, suggesting that the Council revise the talk for publication in their journal Foreign Affairs. Journal editor Hamilton Fish Armstrong had not attended the discussion but requested on January 10 that Kennan revise his talk into an article. Kennan responded to Armstrong in a letter of February 4, writing, "I really can not write anything of value on Russia for publication under my own name. If you would be interested in an anonymous article, or one under a pen name, ... I might be able to make the necessary arrangements." Armstrong replied on March 7, agreeing to Kennan's suggestion, writing that the "disadvantage of anonymity" was outweighed by the potential importance of the article.

Taking time off from the State Department, Kennan worked as a lecturer at the National War College. His work left him little time to write a new essay, so he searched for previous work to repurpose. In January 1946, Forrestal had asked Kennan for an analysis of a piece by Smith College professor Edward F. Willett entitled "Dialectical Materialism And Russian Objectives". Kennan was unimpressed with the work, but decided that rather than denigrating the piece he would instead publish a new analysis. The paper, titled "Psychological Background of Soviet Foreign Policy", was around six thousand words. In late January 1946 he sent it to Forrestal, who described it as "extremely well-done" before sending it on to General Marshall. (Note: In his memoirs, Kennan writes that he originally wrote the piece only for Forrestal's "private and personal edification". Gaddis disputes this characterization, writing that the piece seems too carefully constructed to have been only intended for one person: "the tone is that of a stem-winding sermon [that] preachers normally seek out [in] pulpits.") In a letter of March 10 to John T. Connor, an aide of Forrestal, Kennan inquired as to whether it would be appropriate to publish this piece anonymously in Foreign Affairs. Forrestal agreed, as did the State Department's Committee on Unofficial Publications.

Kennan made several minor corrections to the piece, along with scratching his name out and writing "X" in its place. He added a note on authorship, writing: "The author of this article is one who has had long experience with Russian affairs, both practically and academically, but whose position makes it impossible for him to write about them under his own name." Armstrong published Kennan's piece under the title "The Sources of Soviet Conduct", removing Kennan's note and leaving only the "X" as an identifier.

=== "The Sources of Soviet Conduct" ===
... it is clear that the main element of any United States policy toward the Soviet Union must be that of a long-term, patient but firm and vigilant containment of Russian expansive tendencies.

— "X" (Kennan), The Sources of Soviet Conduct, Section II

Kennan's piece opens with a description of how the Soviet leaders were shaped by Marxism-Leninism, serving as the "pseudo-scientific justification" for why Stalin and the other leaders ought to remain in power despite lacking popular support. At times quoting Edward Gibbon's The Decline and Fall of the Roman Empire, he writes that the Soviet leaders' "aggressive intransigence" against the outside world compelled them "to chastise the contumacy" which they had provoked. In order to maintain power, the Soviet leaders would need to maintain the illusion of external threats:

... the [Soviet] leadership is at liberty to put forward for tactical purposes any particular thesis which it finds useful to the cause at any particular moment and to require the faithful and unquestioning acceptance of that thesis by the members of the movement as a whole. This means that truth is not a constant but is actually created, for all intents and purposes, by the Soviet leaders themselves.

The Soviets, however, were not prepared to attempt an immediate overthrow of the West, it being implicit in their ideology that capitalism would inevitably fail. They would instead turn their focus to the long-term goal of "[filling] every nook and cranny available to it in the basin of world power." To oppose them, the United States would need long-term strategies to contain Soviet expansionary ambitions. Containment against the Soviets, Kennan explains, would require an application of "counter-force" along shifting points of geographical and political interests. This "perimeter defense" concept, in which all geographic areas were considered of equal importance, required the United States "to confront the Russians with unalterable counter-force at every point where they show signs of encroaching upon the interests of a peaceful and stable world."

Containment would prove its success in the long-term because the Soviet economy was rudimentary and the government leadership lacked procedures for orderly succession. Any disruption in Soviet politics held the possibility of "[changing the state] overnight from one of the strongest to one of the weakest and most pitiable of national societies." Containment was particularly suited for use against the Soviets, Kennan thought, because of their Marxist-Leninist ideology, which encourages a patience not evident with leaders like Napoleon or Adolf Hitler. He continues: "... the Kremlin is under no ideological compulsion to accomplish its purposes in a hurry. Like the Church, it is dealing in ideological concepts which are of long-term validity ... It has no right to risk the existing achievements of the revolution for the sake of vain baubles of the future."

... the possibility remains (and in the opinion of this writer it is a strong one) that Soviet power, like the capitalist world of its conception, bears within it the seeds of its own decay, and that the sprouting of these seeds is well advanced.

— "X" (Kennan), The Sources of Soviet Conduct, Section III

The end result of containment would allow for "either the break-up or the gradual mellowing of Soviet power". The indefinite frustration the Soviets were bound to face would necessitate their adjustment to the reality of their situation. The strategy would require the United States to manage its own issues successfully, with Kennan concluding that: "To avoid destruction the United States need only measure up to its own best traditions and prove itself worthy of preservation as a great nation. Surely, there was never a fairer test of national quality than this."

== Impact of the Foreign Affairs article ==
=== Immediate ===
Armstrong wrote to Kennan in May 1947: "It's a pleasure for an editor to deal with something that needs practically no revision. ... I only wish for your sake as well as for ours that it could carry your name." The long delay between its writing and publication – some five months – meant the piece did not discuss either of the recent communist uprisings in Greece and Turkey, nor did it mention the Truman Doctrine. The piece was due for inclusion in Foreign Affairs' next issue, July 1947. (Note: The July 1947 issue first became available in late June.) With a little over 19,000 subscribers and an expensive cover price for the time of $1.25 (equivalent to $18 in 2025), the magazine did not circulate widely. The July issue did not deviate from regular buying trends, until journalist Arthur Krock drew attention to the "X" article in a New York Times column of July 8. Krock suggested that the main thrust of "The Sources of Soviet Conduct" was "exactly that adopted by the American government after appeasement of the Kremlin proved a failure", and wrote that the piece's author had clearly studied the Soviet Union "at the closest range possible for a foreigner". Krock concludes that the author's views "closely resemble those marked "Top Secret" in several official files in Washington."

Krock's column resulted in a rush for copies of Foreign Affairs. He had not identified Kennan as "X" in his column, but proved responsible for revealing Kennan's identity; Forrestal had let Krock see the draft copy sent to Foreign Affairs which still contained Kennan's name at its end. Other diplomats suspected Kennan's authorship due to the piece's distinct prose as well as the quoting of Edward Gibbon. As the rumor spread, the State Department offered no comment. The Daily Worker, the newspaper of the Communist Party of the United States, broke the story on Kennan's identity, with a headline on July 9 that read: "'X' Bared as State Dep't Aid [sic]: Calls for Overthrow of Soviet Government".

Kennan's role in the State Department lent the article the authority of an official policy declaration. Though he had not intended the article to be a comprehensive statement on American foreign policy, a piece in the 21 July issue of Newsweek explained that the "X" article provided a rationale for both the Truman Doctrine and the Marshall Plan and "[charted] the course that this country is likely to pursue for years to come." Marshall, concerned by the amount of attention both Kennan and the article were drawing, spoke with Kennan in a private meeting. Kennan's explanation that the article had been "cleared for publication by the competent official committee" satisfied Marshall, "[b]ut it was long, I suspect, before he recovered from his astonishment over the strange ways of the department he now headed."

=== Walter Lippmann's critique ===
Political commentator Walter Lippmann responded to the article, published in the New York Herald Tribune across fourteen different columns, the first which appeared on September 2, 1947. Lippmann's analysis was widely read and collected in his 1947 book, The Cold War. (Note: Lippmann's book was one of the first times that the term "cold war" was applied to the geopolitical conflict. Refer to Lippmann 1947.) Lippmann critiqued the article as having presented a "strategic monstrosity", providing the Soviets with the initiative in any conflict, resulting in the United States depending on "a coalition of disorganized, disunited, feeble or disorderly nations, tribes and factions."

Lippmann incorrectly concluded that Kennan's article had inspired the Truman Doctrine, which Lippmann opposed. Kennan's article was completed in late January 1947 and Truman announced his Doctrine in a March 12, 1947 speech. Despite this chronology, Gaddis writes: "there is no evidence that it influenced the drafting of that address and abundant evidence that Kennan had sought to remove the language in it to which Lippmann later objected." For Lippmann, however, the piece was "not only an analytical interpretation of the sources of Soviet conduct. It is also a document of primary importance on the sources of American foreign policy – of at least that part of it which is known as the Truman Doctrine."

Because of the rushed nature in which Kennan had written the article, he regretted some views expressed within and agreed with some of Lippmann's critiques. Though Kennan did not send the final draft of the piece until 11 April – a month after the announcement of the Truman Doctrine – he did not revise it, despite having disagreements with sections of the Doctrine. Kennan's position in the State Department made him hesitant to offer any public clarification, and he would not respond until the publication of the first volume of his memoirs in 1967.

=== Long term ===
"The Sources of Soviet Conduct" widely introduced the term "containment". Reflecting on the article in his 1979 memoir, Henry Kissinger writes, "George Kennan came as close to authoring the diplomatic doctrine of his era as any diplomat in our history." Gaddis writes that Kennan's silence in the face of Lippmann's critiques resulted in the idea of containment becoming "synonymous, in the minds of most people who knew the phrase, with Truman's doctrine". Gaddis further writes that some have misinterpreted Kennan's views by placing undue emphasis on the "conspicuous but misleading 'X' article". (Note: As examples, Gaddis points to Wright 1976, Mark 1978 and Halle 1967, pp. 106–108.)

In the article, Kennan uses the term "counterforce" rather than "counter-pressure" and does not explain its meaning, something he admitted in his memoirs led to confusion for readers. Kennan reassessed his views on perimeter defense after the article was published, instead shifting to the idea of "strongpoint defense", in which defense was instead focused on particular areas.

Kennan recalled in his memoirs that his "entire diplomatic experience took place in rather high northern latitudes". Thomas Borstelmann writes that Kennan's few experiences outside of Europe contributed to his detestation of the people of Africa, Asia, the Middle East and Latin America: "He tended to lump them together as impulsive, fanatical, ignorant, lazy, unhappy, and prone to mental disorders and other biological deficiencies." In the first of his memoirs, published in 1967, Kennan links Soviet despotism to its leaders "attitude of Oriental secretiveness and conspiracy". In a 1942 lecture, he explained that the Bolshevik Revolution of 1917 revealed the Russians were not "westernized" but instead "17th century semi-Asiatic people". Borstelmann further writes that Kennan's perspectives on race were not unique to him but were instead common in his contemporary American policymaking circles.

== See also ==
- "A National Strategic Narrative" by Mr. Y, also known as the Y Article, which was later inspired by the "X Article"
- Martin Malia, whose essay on the decline of the Soviet Union, "To the Stalin Mausoleum", was published under the pseudonym "Z"
