= George F. Kennan =

American diplomat, political scientist, and historian (1904–2005)

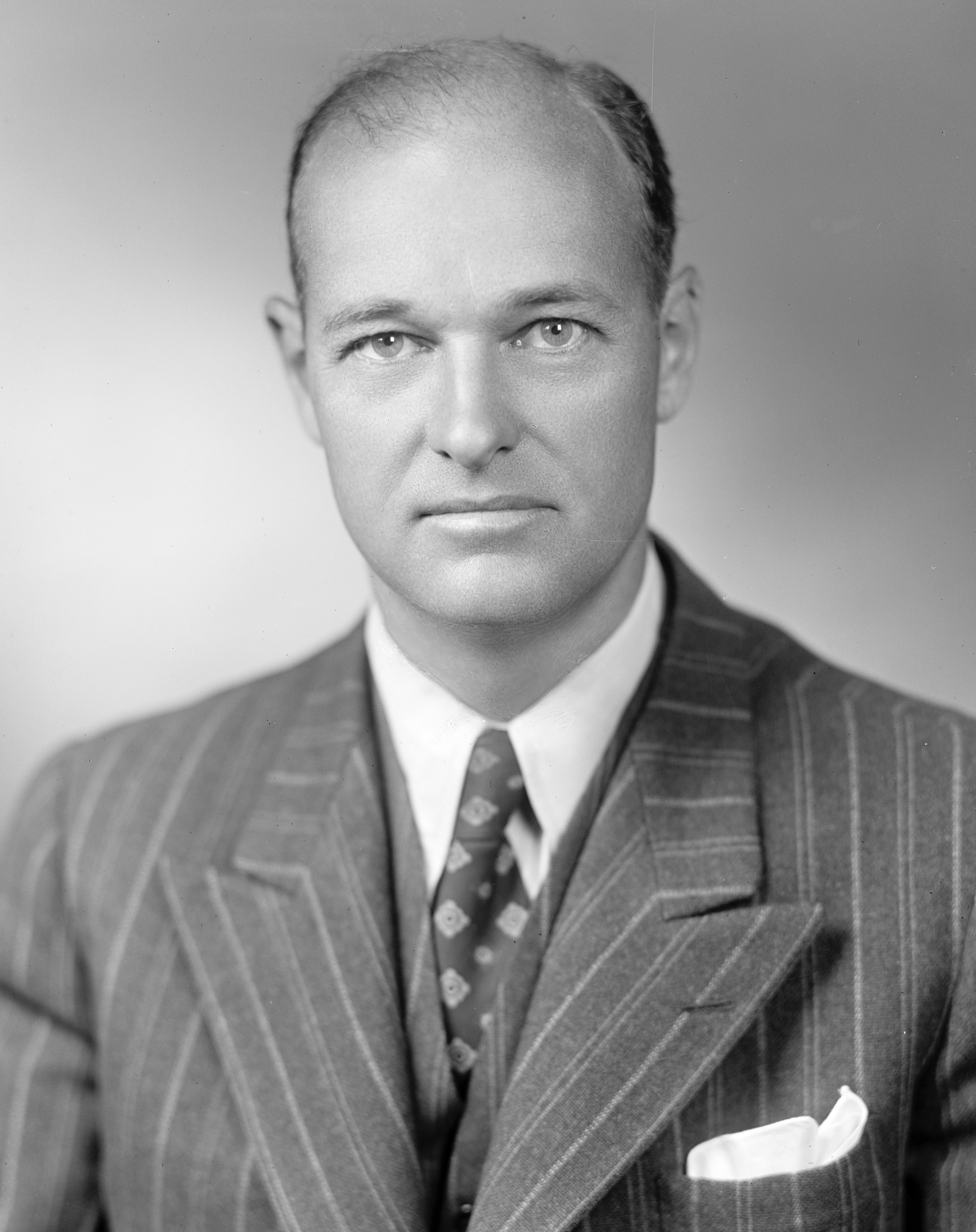
- Kennan in 1947

United States Ambassador to Yugoslavia
- In office May 16, 1961 – July 28, 1963
- President: John F. Kennedy
- Preceded by: Karl L. Rankin
- Succeeded by: Charles Burke Elbrick

United States Ambassador to the Soviet Union
- In office May 14, 1952 – September 19, 1952
- President: Harry S. Truman
- Preceded by: Alan G. Kirk
- Succeeded by: Charles E. Bohlen

8th Counselor of the United States Department of State
- In office August 4, 1949 – January 1, 1950
- President: Harry S. Truman
- Preceded by: Charles E. Bohlen
- Succeeded by: Charles E. Bohlen

1st Director of Policy Planning
- In office May 5, 1947 – May 31, 1949
- President: Harry S. Truman
- Preceded by: Office established
- Succeeded by: Paul H. Nitze

Personal details
- Born: George Frost Kennan; February 16, 1904 Milwaukee, Wisconsin, U.S.
- Died: March 17, 2005 (aged 101) Princeton, New Jersey, U.S.
- Spouse: Annelise Sorensen (m. 1931)
- Education: Princeton University (AB)
- Profession: Diplomat; Political scientist; Historian

George Frost Kennan (February 16, 1904 – March 17, 2005) was an American diplomat and historian. He was best known as an advocate of a policy of containment of Soviet expansion during the Cold War. He lectured widely and wrote scholarly histories of the relations between the USSR and the United States. He was also one of the group of foreign policy elders known as "The Wise Men".

During the late 1940s, his writings confirmed the Truman Doctrine and inspired the U.S. foreign policy of containing the USSR. His "Long Telegram" from Moscow in 1946 and the subsequent 1947 article "The Sources of Soviet Conduct" argued that the Soviet regime was inherently expansionist and that its influence had to be "contained" in areas of vital strategic importance to the United States. These texts provided justification for the Truman administration's new anti-Soviet policy. Kennan played a major role in the development of definitive Cold War programs and institutions, notably the Marshall Plan.

Soon after his concepts had become U.S. policy, Kennan began to criticize the foreign policies that he had helped articulate. By late 1948, Kennan became confident that the US could commence positive dialogue with the Soviet government. His proposals were dismissed by the Truman administration, and Kennan's influence waned, particularly after Dean Acheson was appointed Secretary of State in 1949. Soon thereafter, U.S. Cold War strategy assumed a more assertive and militaristic quality, causing Kennan to lament what he believed was an abrogation of his previous assessments.

In 1950, Kennan left the State Department—except for a brief ambassadorial stint in Moscow and a longer one in Yugoslavia—and became a realist critic of U.S. foreign policy. He continued to analyze international affairs as a faculty member of the Institute for Advanced Study from 1956 until his death in 2005 at age 101.

== Early life ==
Kennan was born in Milwaukee, Wisconsin, to Kossuth Kent Kennan, a lawyer specializing in tax law, and Florence James Kennan. His father was a descendant of impoverished Scots-Irish settlers from 18th-century Connecticut and Massachusetts, and had been named after the Hungarian patriot Lajos Kossuth (1802–1894). His mother died two months after his birth due to peritonitis from a ruptured appendix, though Kennan long believed that she died after giving birth to him. The boy always lamented not having a mother. He was never close to his father or stepmother; however, he was close to his older sisters.

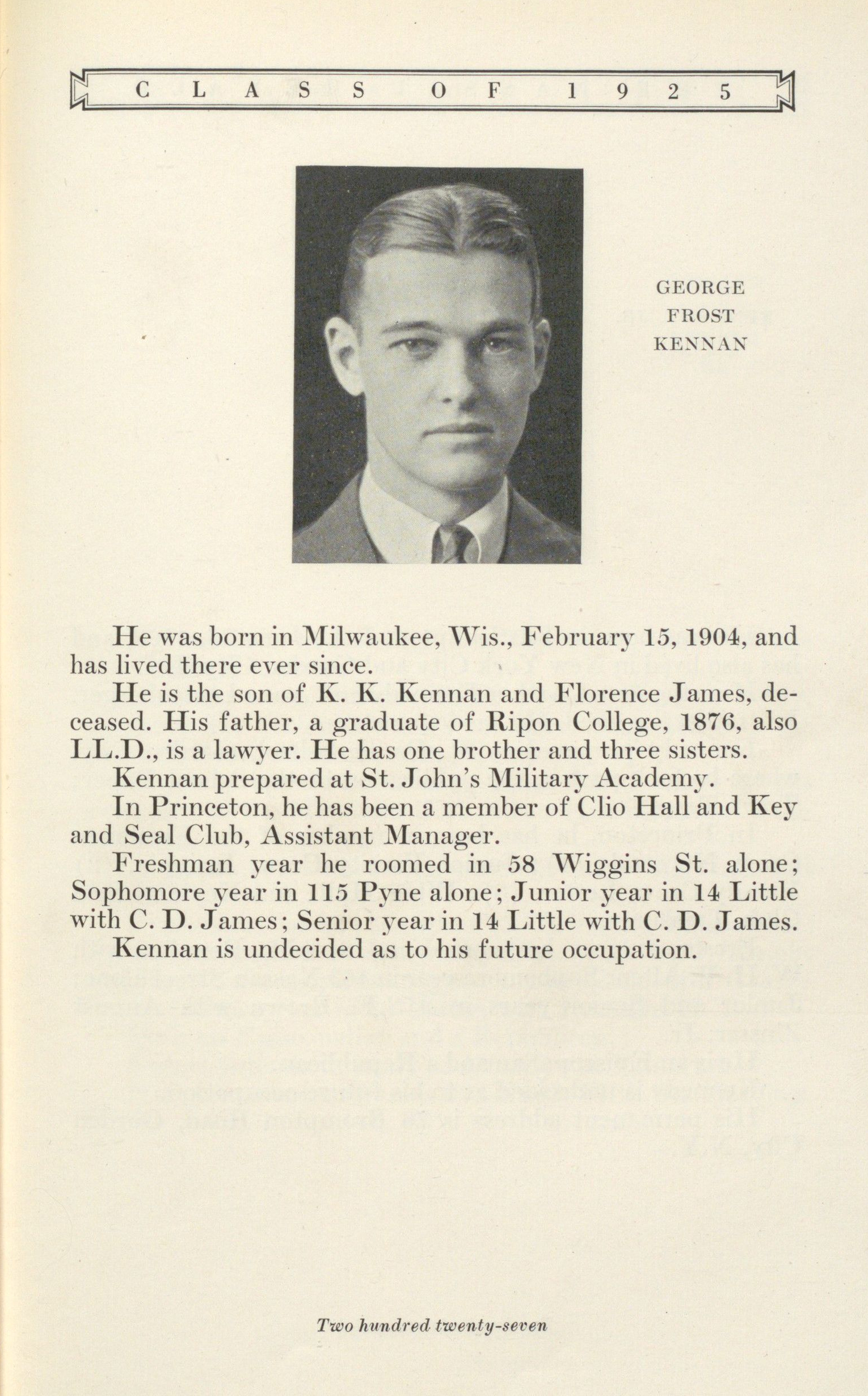
Kennan in the Princeton University yearbook, 1925

At the age of eight, Kennan went to Germany to stay with his stepmother in order to learn German. During the summers of 1915 and 1916, he attended Camp Highlands in Sayner, Wisconsin, then known as the Wisconsin Highlands Summer Camp. He attended St. John's Military Academy in Delafield, Wisconsin, and arrived at Princeton University in the second half of 1921. Unaccustomed to the elite atmosphere of the Ivy League, the shy and introverted Kennan found his undergraduate years difficult and lonely.

== Diplomatic career ==
=== First steps ===
After receiving his bachelor's degree in history in 1925, Kennan considered applying to law school, but decided it was too expensive and instead opted to apply to the newly formed United States Foreign Service. He passed the qualifying examination and after seven months of study at the Foreign Service School in Washington, he obtained his first job as a vice consul in Geneva, Switzerland. Within a year, he was transferred to a post in Hamburg, Germany. In 1928, Kennan considered quitting the Foreign Service to return to a university for graduate studies. Instead, he was selected for a linguist training program that would give him three years of graduate-level study without having to quit the service.

In 1929, Kennan began his program in history, politics, culture, and the Russian language at the Oriental Institute of the University of Berlin. In doing so, he followed in the footsteps of his grandfather's younger cousin, George Kennan (1845–1924), a major 19th century expert on Imperial Russia and author of Siberia and the Exile System, a well-received 1891 account of the Tsarist prison system. During the course of his diplomatic career, Kennan would master a number of other languages, including German, French, Polish, Czech, Portuguese, and Norwegian.

In 1931, Kennan was stationed at the legation in Riga, Latvia, where, as third secretary, he worked on Soviet economic affairs. From his job, Kennan "grew to mature interest in Russian affairs". When the U.S. began formal diplomacy with the Soviet government during 1933 after the election of President Franklin D. Roosevelt, Kennan accompanied Ambassador William C. Bullitt to Moscow. By the mid-1930s, Kennan was among the professionally trained Russian experts of the staff of the United States Embassy in Moscow, along with Charles E. Bohlen and Loy W. Henderson. These officials had been influenced by the long-time director of the State Department's division of East European Affairs, Robert F. Kelley. They believed that there was little basis for cooperation with the Soviet Union, even against potential adversaries. Meanwhile, Kennan studied Stalin's Great Purge, which would affect his opinion of the internal dynamics of the Soviet regime for the rest of his life.

=== At the Soviet Embassy ===
Kennan found himself in strong disagreement with Joseph E. Davies, Bullitt's successor as ambassador to the Soviet Union, who defended the Great Purge and other aspects of Stalin's rule. Kennan did not have any influence on Davies' decisions, and Davies himself even suggested that Kennan be transferred out of Moscow for "his health". Kennan again contemplated resigning from the service, but instead decided to accept the Russian desk at the State Department in Washington. A man with a high opinion of himself, Kennan began writing the first draft of his memoirs at the age of 34 when he was still a relatively junior diplomat. In a letter to his sister Jeannette in 1935, Kennan expressed his disenchantment with American life, writing: "I hate the rough and tumble of our political life. I hate democracy; I hate the press … I hate the 'peepul'; I have become clearly un-American."

=== Prague and Berlin ===
By September 1938, Kennan had been reassigned to a job at the legation in Prague. After the occupation of the Czechoslovak Republic by Nazi Germany at the beginning of World War II, Kennan was assigned to Berlin. There, he endorsed the United States' Lend-Lease policy but warned against any notion of American endorsement of the Soviets, whom he considered unfit allies. He was interned in Germany for six months after Germany, followed by the other Axis states, declared war on the United States in December 1941.

=== Lisbon calls ===
In September 1942 Kennan was assigned to the legation in Lisbon, Portugal, where he begrudgingly performed a job administering intelligence and base operations. In July 1943 Bert Fish, the American Ambassador in Lisbon, suddenly died, and Kennan became chargé d'affaires and the head of the American Embassy in Portugal. While in Lisbon Kennan played a decisive role in getting Portugal's approval for the use of the Azores Islands by American naval and air forces during World War II. Initially confronted with clumsy instructions and lack of coordination from Washington, Kennan took the initiative by personally talking to President Roosevelt and obtained from the president a letter to the Portuguese premier, Salazar, that unlocked the concession of facilities in the Azores.

=== Second Soviet posting ===
In January 1944, he was sent to London, where he served as counselor of the American delegation to the European Advisory Commission, which worked to prepare Allied policy in Europe. There, Kennan became even more disenchanted with the State Department, which he believed was ignoring his qualifications as a trained specialist. However, within months of beginning the job, he was appointed deputy chief of the mission in Moscow upon request of W. Averell Harriman, the ambassador to the USSR.

==== "Long Telegram" ====
In Moscow, Kennan again felt that his opinions were being ignored by President Truman and policymakers in Washington. Kennan tried repeatedly to persuade policymakers to abandon plans for cooperation with the Soviet government in favor of a sphere of influence policy in Europe to reduce the Soviets' power there. Kennan believed that a federation needed to be established in western Europe to counter Soviet influence in the region and to compete against the Soviet stronghold in eastern Europe.

Kennan served as deputy head of the mission in Moscow until April 1946. Near the end of that term, the Treasury Department requested that the State Department explain recent Soviet behavior, such as its disinclination to endorse the International Monetary Fund and the World Bank. Kennan responded on February 22, 1946, by sending a lengthy 5,363-word telegram (sometimes cited as being more than 8,000 words), commonly called "The Long Telegram", from Moscow to Secretary of State James Byrnes outlining a new strategy for diplomatic relations with the Soviet Union. The ideas Kennan expressed in the Long Telegram were not new but the argument he made and the vivid language he used in making it came at an opportune moment. At the "bottom of the Kremlin's neurotic view of world affairs is the traditional and instinctive Russian sense of insecurity". After the Russian Revolution, this sense of insecurity became mixed with communist ideology and "Oriental secretiveness and conspiracy".

Soviet international behavior depended mainly on the internal necessities of Joseph Stalin's regime; according to Kennan, Stalin needed a hostile world in order to legitimize his autocratic rule. Stalin thus used Marxism-Leninism as a "justification for the Soviet Union's instinctive fear of the outside world, for the dictatorship without which they did not know how to rule, for cruelties they did not dare not to inflict, for sacrifice they felt bound to demand … Today they cannot dispense with it. It is the fig leaf of their moral and intellectual respectability".

The solution was to strengthen Western institutions in order to render them invulnerable to the Soviet challenge while awaiting the mellowing of the Soviet regime. Using propaganda and culture was vital to Kennan, it was important that America presented itself correctly to foreign audiences and the Soviets would limit the cultural cross contamination of America and USSR. It is notable that Kennan shared his telegram with his friend and collaborator at the British Embassy in Moscow, Frank Kenyon Roberts, whom he had first met in Lisbon in 1943. As his Embassy's chargé d'affaires, Roberts drew on some of Kennan's ideas in March 1946 when he presented his own, lengthy analyses of Soviet policies in which he encouraged the British government to take a firm stance towards the Soviet Union and to relinquish hopes of Anglo-Soviet cooperation. Roberts' arguments went down well in Whitehall, which meant that Kennan influenced British policies as well as American ones, and contributed to the development of the Anglo-American Cold War partnership.

=== At the National War College ===
The long telegram dispatch brought Kennan to the attention of Secretary of the Navy James Forrestal, a major advocate of a confrontational policy with regard to the Soviets, the United States' former wartime ally. Forrestal helped bring Kennan back to Washington, where he served as the first deputy for foreign affairs at the National War College and then strongly influenced his decision to publish the "X" article. In March 1947, Truman appeared before Congress to request funding for the Truman Doctrine to fight Communism in Greece. "I believe that it must be the policy of the United States to support free peoples who are resisting attempted subjugation by armed minorities or by outside pressures."

==== "X" ====
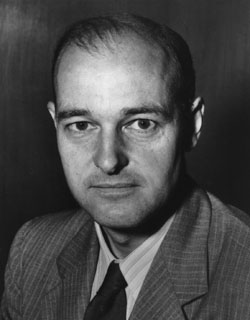
Kennan c. 1950

Unlike the "long telegram", Kennan's well-timed article appearing in the July 1947 issue of Foreign Affairs under the pseudonym "X", titled "The Sources of Soviet Conduct", did not begin by emphasizing "traditional and instinctive Russian sense of insecurity"; instead, it asserted that Stalin's policy was shaped by a combination of Marxist–Leninist ideology, which advocated revolution to defeat the capitalist forces in the outside world and Stalin's determination to use the notion of "capitalist encirclement" in order to legitimize his regimentation of Soviet society so that he could consolidate his political power. Kennan argued that Stalin would not (and moreover could not) moderate the supposed Soviet determination to overthrow Western governments. Thus:

... the main element of any United States policy toward the Soviet Union must be a long-term, patient but firm and vigilant containment of Russian expansive tendencies.... Soviet pressure against the free institutions of the Western world is something that can be contained by the adroit and vigilant application of counterforce at a series of constantly shifting geographical and political points, corresponding to the shifts and manœuvres of Soviet policy, but which cannot be charmed or talked out of existence.

The goal of his policy was to withdraw all U.S. forces from Europe. "The settlement reached would give the Kremlin sufficient reassurance against the establishment of regimes in Eastern Europe hostile to the Soviet Union, tempering the degree of control over that area that the Soviet leaders felt it necessary to exercise". Kennan further argued that the United States would have to perform this containment alone, but if it could do so without undermining its own economic health and political stability, the Soviet party structure would undergo a period of immense strain eventually resulting in "either the break-up or the gradual mellowing of Soviet power."

The publication of the "X" article soon began one of the more intense debates of the Cold War. Walter Lippmann, a leading American commentator on international affairs, strongly criticized the "X" article. Lippmann argued that Kennan's strategy of containment was "a strategic monstrosity" that could "be implemented only by recruiting, subsidizing, and supporting a heterogeneous array of satellites, clients, dependents, and puppets". Lippmann argued that diplomacy should be the basis of relations with the Soviets; he suggested that the U.S. withdraw its forces from Europe and reunify and demilitarize Germany. Meanwhile, it was soon revealed informally that "X" was indeed Kennan. This information seemed to give the "X" article the status of an official document expressing the Truman administration's new policy toward Moscow.

Kennan had not intended the "X" article as a prescription for policy. For the rest of his life, Kennan continued to reiterate that the article did not imply an automatic commitment to resist Soviet "expansionism" wherever it occurred, with little distinction of primary and secondary interests. The article did not make it obvious that Kennan favored employing political and economic rather than military methods as the chief agent of containment. "My thoughts about containment," said Kennan in a 1996 interview to CNN, "were of course distorted by the people who understood it and pursued it exclusively as a military concept; and I think that that, as much as any other cause, led to [the] 40 years of unnecessary, fearfully expensive and disoriented process of the Cold War". Additionally, the administration made few attempts to explain the distinction between Soviet influence and international Communism to the U.S. public. "In part, this failure reflected the belief of many in Washington," writes historian John Lewis Gaddis, "that only the prospect of an undifferentiated global threat could shake Americans out of their isolationist tendencies that remained latent among them."

In a PBS television interview with David Gergen in 1996, Kennan again reiterated that he did not regard the Soviets as primarily a military threat, noting that "they were not like Hitler". Kennan's opinion was that this misunderstanding:

all came down to one sentence in the "X" article where I said that wherever these people, meaning the Soviet leadership, confronted us with dangerous hostility anywhere in the world, we should do everything possible to contain it and not let them expand any further. I should have explained that I didn't suspect them of any desire to launch an attack on us. This was right after the war, and it was absurd to suppose that they were going to turn around and attack the United States. I didn't think I needed to explain that, but I obviously should have done it.

The "X" article meant sudden fame for Kennan. After the long telegram, he recalled later, "My official loneliness came in fact to an end ... My reputation was made. My voice now carried."

==== Influence under Marshall ====
Between April 1947 and December 1948, when George C. Marshall was Secretary of State, Kennan was more influential than he was at any other period in his career. Marshall valued his strategic sense and had him create and direct what is now named the Policy Planning Staff, the State Department's internal think tank. Kennan became the first Director of Policy Planning. Marshall relied heavily on him to prepare policy recommendations. Kennan played a central role in the drafting of the Marshall Plan.

Although Kennan regarded the Soviet Union as too weak to risk war, he nonetheless considered it an enemy capable of expanding into Western Europe through subversion, given the popular support for Communist parties in Western Europe, which remained demoralized by the devastation of the Second World War. To counter this potential source of Soviet influence, Kennan's solution was to direct economic aid and covert political help to Japan and Western Europe to revive Western governments and assist international capitalism; by doing so, the United States would help to rebuild the balance of power. In June 1948, Kennan proposed covert assistance to left-wing parties not oriented toward Moscow and to labor unions in Western Europe in order to engineer a rift between Moscow and working-class movements in Western Europe. In 1947, Kennan supported Truman's decision to extend economic aid to the Greek government fighting a civil war against Communist guerrillas, though he argued against military aid. The historian John Latrides argued that Kennan's claim that the Soviet Union would go to war if the United States gave military aid to Greece is hard to square with his claim that the Soviet Union was too weak to risk war, and the real reason for his opposition to military aid was that he did not regard Greece as important.

As the United States was initiating the Marshall Plan, Kennan and the Truman administration hoped that the Soviet Union's rejection of Marshall aid would strain its relations with its Communist allies in Eastern Europe. Kennan initiated a series of efforts to exploit the schism between the Soviets and Josip Broz Tito's Yugoslavia. Kennan proposed conducting covert action in the Balkans to further decrease Moscow's influence.

The administration's new vigorously anti-Soviet policy also became evident when, at Kennan's suggestion, the U.S. changed its hostility to Francisco Franco's anti-communist regime in Spain in order to secure U.S. influence in the Mediterranean. Kennan had observed during 1947 that the Truman Doctrine implied a new consideration of Franco. His suggestion soon helped begin a new phase of U.S.–Spanish relations, which ended with military cooperation after 1950. Kennan played an important role in devising the plans for American economic aid to Greece, insisting upon a capitalist mode of development and upon economic integration with the rest of Europe. In the case of Greece, most of the Marshall Plan aid went towards rebuilding a war-devastated country that was already poor even before World War II. Though Marshall Plan aid to Greece was successful in building or rebuilding ports, railroads, paved roads, a hydro-electricity transmission system, and a nationwide telephone system, the attempt to impose "good government" on Greece was less successful. The Greek economy was historically dominated by a rentier system in which a few wealthy families, a highly politicized officer corps and the royal family controlled the economy for their own benefit. Kennan's advice to open up the Greek economy was completely ignored by the Greek elite. Kennan supported France's war to regain control of Vietnam as he argued that control of Southeast Asia with its raw materials was critical to the economic recovery of Western Europe and Japan, but by 1949, he changed his views, becoming convinced that the French would never defeat the Communist Viet Minh guerrillas.

In 1949, Kennan suggested what became known as "Program A" or "Plan A" for the reunification of Germany, stating the partition of Germany was unsustainable in the long run. Kennan argued that the American people would sooner or later grow tired of occupying their zone in Germany and would inevitably demand the pull-out of U.S. troops. Or alternatively Kennan predicted the Soviets would pull their forces out of East Germany, knowing full well that they could easily return from their bases in Poland, forcing the United States to do likewise, but as the Americans lacked bases in other Western European nations, this would hand the advantage to the Soviets. Finally, Kennan argued that the German people were proud and would not stand having their nation occupied by foreigners forever, making a solution to the "German question" imperative. Kennan's solution was for the reunification and neutralization of Germany; the withdrawal of most of the British, American, French and Soviet forces from Germany with the exception of small enclaves near the border that would be supplied by sea; and a four-power commission from the four occupying powers that would have the ultimate say while allowing the Germans to mostly govern themselves.

==== Differences with Acheson ====
Kennan's influence rapidly decreased when Dean Acheson became Secretary of State, succeeding the ailing George Marshall during 1949 and 1950. Acheson did not regard the Soviet "threat" as chiefly political, and he saw the Berlin Blockade starting in June 1948, the first Soviet test of a nuclear weapon in August 1949, the Communist revolution in China a month later, and the beginning of the Korean War in June 1950, as evidence. Truman and Acheson decided to delineate the Western sphere of influence and to create a system of alliances. Kennan argued in a paper that the mainland of Asia be excluded from the "containment" policies, writing that the United States was "greatly overextended in its whole thinking about what we can accomplish and should try to accomplish" in Asia. Instead, he argued that Japan and the Philippines should serve as the "cornerstone of a Pacific security system". Acheson approved Program A shortly after he took up office as Secretary of State, writing in the margin of Kennan's paper that the "division of Germany was not an end onto itself".

Plan A encountered massive objections from the Pentagon, who saw it as abandoning West Germany to the Soviet Union, and from within the State Department, with the diplomat Robert Murphy arguing that the mere existence of a prosperous and democratic West Germany would be destabilizing to East Germany, and hence the Soviet Union. More important, Plan A required the approval of the British and French governments, but neither was in favor of Program A, complaining it was far too early to end the occupation of Germany. Both public opinion in Britain and even more so in France were afraid of what might happen if the Allies loosened their control over Germany just four years after the end of World War II, and for reasons of geography and history, did not share Kennan's assurance that a reunified Germany would cause difficulties only for the Soviets. In May 1949, a distorted version of Plan A was leaked to the French press with the principal distortion being that the United States was willing to pull out of all of Europe in exchange for a reunified and neutral Germany. In the ensuing uproar, Acheson disallowed Plan A. Kennan lost influence with Acheson, who in any case relied much less on his staff than Marshall had. Kennan resigned as director of policy planning in December 1949 but stayed in the department as counselor until June 1950.

In January 1950, Acheson replaced Kennan with Nitze, who was much more comfortable with the calculus of military power. Afterwards, Kennan accepted an appointment as Visitor to the Institute for Advanced Study from fellow moderate Robert Oppenheimer, director of the institute. In October 1949, the Chinese Communists under Mao Zedong won the Chinese Civil War and proclaimed the People's Republic of China. The "Loss of China", as it has become known in the United States, prompted a fierce right-wing backlash led by Republican politicians such as Richard Nixon and Joseph McCarthy, who used the "loss of China" as a convenient club with which to beat the Democratic Truman administration. Truman, Acheson, and other high officials such as Kennan were all accused of being criminally negligent at best in permitting the supposed loss. One of Kennan's closest friends, the diplomat John Paton Davies Jr. found himself under investigation in November 1949 as a Soviet spy for his role in the process, an allegation that would destroy his career and which horrified Kennan.

What especially disturbed Kennan was that Paton Davies was accused of treason for predicting in a report that Mao would win the Chinese Civil War, which in the climate of hysteria caused by the "loss of China" was enough to lead the FBI to begin investigating him as a Soviet spy. Speaking of the Paton Davies case, Kennan warned that "We have no protection against this happening again", leading him to wonder what diplomat would be investigated next for treason. Kennan found the atmosphere of hysteria, which was labeled as "McCarthyism" in March 1950 by cartoonist Herbert Block, to be deeply uncomfortable. Acheson's policy was realized as NSC 68, a classified report issued by the United States National Security Council in April 1950 and written by Paul Nitze, Kennan's successor as Director of Policy Planning. Kennan and Charles Bohlen, another State Department expert on Russia, argued about the wording of NSC 68, which became the basis of Cold War policy. Kennan rejected the idea that Stalin had a grand design for world conquest implicit in Nitze's report and argued that he actually feared overextending Russian power. Kennan even argued that NSC 68 should not have been drafted at all, as it would make U.S. policies too rigid, simplistic, and militaristic. Acheson overruled Kennan and Bohlen, endorsing the assumption of Soviet menace implied by NSC 68.

Kennan opposed the building of the hydrogen bomb and the rearmament of Germany, which were policies encouraged by the assumptions of NSC 68. During the Korean War (which began when North Korea invaded South Korea in June 1950), when rumors started circulating in the State Department that plans were being made to advance beyond the 38th parallel into North Korea, an act that Kennan considered dangerous, he engaged in intense arguments with Assistant Secretary of State for the Far East Dean Rusk, who apparently endorsed Acheson's goal to forcibly unite the Koreas.

==== Memo to Dulles ====
On 21 August 1950, Kennan submitted a long memo to John Foster Dulles who at the time was engaged in working on the U.S-Japanese peace treaty in which he went beyond American-Japanese relations to offer an outline of his thinking about Asia in general. He called U.S. policy thinking about Asia as "little promising" and "fraught with danger". About the Korean War, Kennan wrote that American policies were based upon what he called "emotional, moralistic attitudes" which "unless corrected, can easily carry us toward real conflict with the Russians and inhibit us from making a realistic agreement about that area". He supported the decision to intervene in Korea, but wrote that "it is not essential to us to see an anti-Soviet Korean regime extended to all of Korea." Kennan expressed much fear about what General Douglas MacArthur might do, saying he had "wide and relatively uncontrolled latitude … in determining our policy in the north Asian and western Pacific areas", which Kennan viewed as a problem as he felt MacArthur's judgement was poor.

==== Criticism of American diplomacy ====
Kennan's 1951 book American Diplomacy, 1900–1950, strongly criticized American foreign policy of the last 50 years. He warned against U.S. participation and reliance on multilateral, legalistic and moralistic organizations such as the United Nations. Despite his influence, Kennan was never really comfortable in government. He always regarded himself as an outsider and had little patience with critics. W. Averell Harriman, the U.S. ambassador in Moscow when Kennan was deputy between 1944 and 1946, remarked that Kennan was "a man who understood Russia but not the United States".

=== Ambassador to the Soviet Union ===
In December 1951, President Truman nominated Kennan to be the next United States ambassador to the USSR. His appointment was endorsed strongly by the Senate. In many respects (to Kennan's consternation) the priorities of the administration emphasized creating alliances against the Soviets more than negotiating differences with them. In his memoirs, Kennan recalled, "So far as I could see, we were expecting to be able to gain our objectives … without making any concessions though, only 'if we were really all-powerful, and could hope to get away with it.' I very much doubted that this was the case."

At Moscow, Kennan found the atmosphere even more regimented than on his previous trips, with police guards following him everywhere, discouraging contact with Soviet citizens. At the time, Soviet propaganda charged the U.S. with preparing for war, which Kennan did not wholly dismiss. "I began to ask myself whether … we had not contributed … by the overmilitarization of our policies and statements … to a belief in Moscow that it was war we were after, that we had settled for its inevitability, that it was only a matter of time before we would unleash it."

In September 1952, Kennan made a statement that cost him his ambassadorship. In an answer to a question at a press conference, Kennan compared his conditions at the ambassador's residence in Moscow to those he had encountered while interned in Berlin during the first few months of hostilities between the United States and Germany. While his statement was not unfounded, the Soviets interpreted it as an implied analogy with Nazi Germany. The Soviets then declared Kennan persona non grata and refused to allow him to re-enter the USSR. Kennan acknowledged retrospectively that it was a "foolish thing for me to have said".

=== Criticism of diplomacy under Truman ===
Kennan was critical of the Truman administration's policy of supporting France in Vietnam, writing that the French were fighting a "hopeless" war, "which neither they nor we, nor both of us together, can win." About what he called the "rival Chinese regimes" (i.e. the People's Republic of China on the mainland and the Republic of China on Taiwan), Kennan predicted that the U.S. policy of supporting the Kuomintang government in Taiwan would "strengthen Peiping [Beijing]–Moscow solidarity rather than weaken it". Anticipating playing the "China card" strategy, Kennan argued that the United States should work to divide the Sino-Soviet bloc which had the potential to dominate Eurasia, and to this end should give China's seat on the UN Security Council to the People's Republic of China. In the atmosphere of rage and fury caused by the "loss of China" in 1950, it was politically impossible for the Truman administration to recognize the government in Beijing, and giving China's United Nations seat to the People's Republic was the closest the United States could go in building a relationship with the new government. About the ostensible subject of his paper, Kennan called Japan the "most important single factor in Asia". Kennan advocated a deal with the Soviet Union where in exchange for ending the Korean War the United States would ensure that Japan would remain a demilitarized and neutral state in the Cold War.

==== Five industrial zones ====
Kennan's basic concept governing his thinking on foreign policy was to control the "five industrialized zones", which would define the dominant world power. The zones were: the United States/Great Britain; the Rhineland and the Ruhr, eastern France, and the Low Countries; the Soviet Union; and Japan. Kennan argued that if the zones except for the Soviet Union were aligned with the United States, then it would be the world's dominant power. As such, "containment" applied only to the control of these zones. Kennan disdained the Third World, and viewed European rule over Asia and Africa as appropriate.

These views were typical of many American officials in the late 1940s, but Kennan was unusual in retaining these views for the rest of his life. By the 1950s, many officials such as the Dulleses felt that the perception that the average white American disliked non-white peoples was hurting America's image in Asia, the Middle East, Africa, and Latin America, and this view helped the Soviet Union. Kennan regarded Latin America as in the American sphere of influence and that Washington should inform Latin American leaders that they should "be careful not to wander too far from our side".

Acheson was offended by a Kennan 1950 piece in which he suggested that miscegenation between Europeans, Indians and African slaves was the root cause of Latin America's economic backwardness and refused to distribute it to the rest of the State Department. Kennan felt that both the oil of Iran and the Suez Canal were important to the West, and recommended the United States should support Great Britain control of the Iranian oil industry and the Suez Canal. Kennan wrote that Abadan they were economically crucial, which justified the use of force by the Western powers.

=== Kennan and the Eisenhower administration ===
Kennan returned to Washington, where he became embroiled in disagreements with Dwight D. Eisenhower's hawkish Secretary of State, John Foster Dulles. Even so, he was able to work constructively with the new administration. During the summer of 1953 President Eisenhower asked Kennan to manage the first of a series of top-secret teams, dubbed Operation Solarium, examining the advantages and disadvantages of continuing the Truman administration's policy of containment and of seeking to "roll back" existing areas of Soviet influence. Upon completion of the project, the president seemed to endorse the group's recommendations.

By lending his prestige to Kennan's position, the president tacitly signaled his intention to formulate the strategy of his administration within the framework of its predecessor's, despite the misgivings of some within the Republican Party. The critical difference between the Truman and Eisenhower policies of containment had to do with Eisenhower's concerns that the United States could not indefinitely afford great military spending. The new president thus sought to minimize costs not by acting whenever and wherever the Soviets acted (a strategy designed to avoid risk) but rather whenever and wherever the United States could afford to act. In 1954, Kennan appeared as a character witness for J. Robert Oppenheimer during the government's efforts to revoke his security clearance. Despite his departure from government service, Kennan was frequently still consulted by the officials of the Eisenhower administration. When the CIA obtained the transcript of Khrushchev's "Secret Speech" attacking Stalin in May 1956, Kennan was one of the first people to whom the text of the "Secret Speech" was shown.

On 11 October 1956, Kennan testified to the House Committee of Foreign Affairs about the massive protests going on in Poland that Soviet rule in Eastern Europe was "eroding more rapidly than I ever anticipated". The fact that a nationalist faction of the Polish Communist Party led by Władysław Gomułka overthrew the Stalinist leadership in Warsaw over the objections of Khrushchev, who was forced to reluctantly accept the change in leadership, led Kennan to predicate that Poland was moving in a "Titoist" direction as Gomułka for his all commitment to Communism also made it clear that he wanted Poland to be more independent of Moscow. In 1957, Kennan departed the United States to work as the George Eastman Professor at Balliol College at Oxford. Sir Isaiah Berlin wrote that Kennan expected the Fellows of Balliol College to be engaged in conversation "polished by deep tradition, refinement, moral quality" and was instead disgusted to find that Fellows were engrossed in "a lot of idle gossip about local affairs, academic titles. He was horrified about that. Profound disappointment. England was not as he thought. An idealised image has been shattered".

Kennan wrote about the Fellows of Balliol College in a letter to Oppenheimer: "I've never seen such back-biting, such fury, such fractions in all my life". In the same letter, Kennan wrote that the only Fellow with whom he could have a "serious conversation" was Berlin, and the rest were all obsessed with spreading malicious gossip about each other. However, Kennan was popular with the students at Balliol College as his twice weekly lectures on international relations were as he put it "tremendously successful", indeed to such an extent that he had to be assigned a larger lecture hall as hundreds of students lined up to hear him speak. In October 1957, Kennan delivered the Reith lectures on the BBC under the title Russia, the Atom and the West, stating that if the partition of Germany continued, then "the chances for peace are very slender indeed". Kennan defended the partition of Germany in 1945 as necessary, but went on to say:

But there is a danger in permitting it to harden into a permanent attitude. It expects too much and for too long of a time of the United States, which is not a European power. It does less than justice to the strength and abilities of the European themselves. It leaves unsolved the extremely precarious and unsound arrangements which now govern the status of Berlin—the least disturbance of which could easily produce a new world crisis. It takes no account of the present dangerous situation in the satellite area. It renders permanent what was meant to be temporary. It assigns half of Europe by implication to the Russians. ... The future of Berlin is vital to the future of Germany as a whole: the needs of its people and the extreme insecurity of the Western position there alone would constitute reasons why no one in the West should view the present division of Germany as a satisfactory permanent solution even if no other factors are involved.

To resolve the "German question", Kennan advocated a version of his "program A" of 1949 calling for the complete withdraw of most of the British, French, American and Soviet forces from Germany as a prelude to German reunification and for the neutralization of Germany. Besides his call to a solution to the "German question", Kennan also predicated that Soviet rule in Eastern Europe was "shaky", and the best thing the Western powers could do was to pursue a firm, but essentially non-confrontational policy towards the Soviet Union to persuade Khrushchev it would not be dangerous for him to let Eastern Europe go. The Reith lectures caused much controversy, and involved Kennan in a public war of words with Acheson and the vice president Richard Nixon about the correct solution to the "German question". The West German foreign minister, Heinrich von Brentano, stated about Kennan's Reith lectures: "Whoever says these things is no friend of the German people".

=== Ambassador to Yugoslavia ===
During John F. Kennedy's 1960 presidential election campaign Kennan wrote to the future president to offer some suggestions on how his administration should improve the country's foreign affairs. Kennan wrote, "What is needed is a succession of ... calculated steps, timed in such a way as not only to throw the adversary off balance but to keep him off it, and prepared with sufficient privacy so that the advantage of surprise can be retained." He also urged the administration to "assure a divergence of outlook and policy between the Russians and Chinese," which could be accomplished by improving relations with Soviet Premier Nikita Khrushchev who had wanted to distance himself from the Communist Chinese. He wrote: "We should ... without deceiving ourselves about Khrushchev's political personality and without nurturing any unreal hopes, be concerned to keep him politically in the running and to encourage the survival in Moscow of the tendencies he personifies". Additionally, he recommended that the United States work toward creating divisions within the Soviet bloc by undermining its power in Eastern Europe and encouraging the independent propensities of satellite governments.

Although Kennan had not been considered for a job by Kennedy's advisers, the president himself offered Kennan the choice of ambassadorship in either Poland or Yugoslavia. Kennan was more interested in Yugoslavia, so he accepted Kennedy's offer and began his job in Yugoslavia during May 1961. Kennan was tasked with trying to strengthen Yugoslavia's policy against the Soviets and to encourage other states in the Eastern bloc to pursue autonomy from the Soviets. Kennan found his ambassadorship in Belgrade to be much improved from his experiences in Moscow a decade earlier. He commented, "I was favored in being surrounded with a group of exceptionally able and loyal assistants, whose abilities I myself admired, whose judgment I valued, and whose attitude toward myself was at all times … enthusiastically cooperative … Who was I to complain?" Kennan found the Yugoslav government treated the American diplomats politely, in contrast from the way in which the Russians treated him in Moscow. He wrote that the Yugoslavs "considered me, rightly or wrongly, a distinguished person in the U.S., and they were pleased that someone whose name they had heard before was being sent to Belgrade".

Kennan found it difficult to perform his job in Belgrade. President Josip Broz Tito and his foreign minister, Koča Popović, began to suspect that Kennedy would adopt an anti-Yugoslav policy during his term. Tito and Popović considered Kennedy's decision to observe Captive Nations Week as an indication that the United States would assist anti-communist liberation efforts in Yugoslavia. Tito also believed that the CIA and the Pentagon were the true directors of American foreign policy. Kennan attempted to restore Tito's confidence in the American foreign policy establishment, but his efforts were compromised by a pair of diplomatic blunders, the Bay of Pigs Invasion, and the U-2 spy incident.

Relations between Yugoslavia and the United States quickly began to worsen. In September 1961, Tito held a conference of nonaligned nations, where he delivered speeches that the U.S. government interpreted as being pro-Soviet. According to historian David Mayers, Kennan argued that Tito's perceived pro-Soviet policy was in fact a ploy to "buttress Khrushchev's position within the Politburo against hardliners opposed to improving relations with the West and against China, which was pushing for a major Soviet–U.S. showdown". This policy also earned Tito "credit in the Kremlin to be drawn upon against future Chinese attacks on his communist credentials". While politicians and government officials expressed growing concern about Yugoslavia's relationship with the Soviets, Kennan believed that the country had an "anomalous position in the Cold War that objectively suited U.S. purposes". Kennan also believed that within a few years, Yugoslavia's example would cause states in the Eastern bloc to demand more social and economic autonomy from the Soviets.

By 1962, Congress had passed legislation to deny financial aid grants to Yugoslavia, to withdraw the sale of spare parts for Yugoslav warplanes, and to revoke the country's most favored nation status. Kennan strongly protested the legislation, arguing that it would only result in a straining of relations between Yugoslavia and the U.S. Kennan came to Washington during the summer of 1962 to lobby against the legislation but was unable to elicit a change from Congress. President Kennedy endorsed Kennan privately but remained noncommittal publicly, as he did not want to jeopardize his slim majority support in Congress on a potentially contentious issue.

In a lecture to the staff of the U.S. embassy in Belgrade on 27 October 1962, Kennan came out strongly in support of Kennedy's policies in the Cuban Missile Crisis, saying that Cuba was still in the American sphere of influence and as such the Soviets had no right to place missiles in Cuba. In his speech, Kennan called Fidel Castro's regime "one of the bloodiest dictatorships the world has seen in the entire postwar period", which justified Kennedy's efforts to overthrow the Communist Cuban government. Against Khrushchev's demand that American missiles be pulled out of Turkey as the price for pulling Soviet missiles out of Cuba, Kennan stated Turkey was never in the Soviet sphere of influence whereas Cuba was in the American sphere of influence, which for him made it legitimate for the United States to place missiles in Turkey and illegitimate for the Soviet Union to place missiles in Cuba.

In December 1962 when Tito visited Moscow to meet with Khrushchev, Kennan reported to Washington that Tito was a Russophile as he lived in Russia between 1915 and 1920, and still had sentimental memories of the Russian Revolution of 1917, which had converted him to Communism. However, Kennan observed from his dealings with Tito that he was firmly committed to keeping Yugoslavia neutral in the Cold War, and his expressions of affection for Russian culture during his visit to Moscow did not mean that he wanted Yugoslavia back into the Soviet bloc. Accordingly, to Kennan, the Sino-Soviet split had caused Khrushchev to want a reconciliation with Tito to counter the Chinese charge that the Soviet Union was a bullying imperialist power, and Tito was willing to accept better relations with the Soviet Union to improve his bargaining power with the West. Kennan also described Tito's championing of the non-aligned movement as a way of improving Yugoslavia's bargaining power with both West and East, as it allowed him to cast himself as a world leader who spoke for an important bloc of nations instead of being based on the "intrinsic value" of the non-aligned movement (which was actually little as most of the non-aligned nations were poor Third World nations). In this regard, Kennan reported to Washington that senior Yugoslav officials had told him that Tito's speeches praising the non-aligned movement were just diplomatic posturing that should not be taken too seriously.

However, many in Congress did take Tito's speeches seriously, and reached the conclusion that Yugoslavia was an anti-Western nation, much to Kennan's chagrin. Kennan argued that since Tito wanted Yugoslavia to be neutral in the Cold War, that there was no point in expecting Yugoslavia to align itself with the West, but Yugoslav neutrality did serve American interests as it ensured that Yugoslavia's powerful army was not at the disposal of the Soviets and the Soviet Union had no air or naval bases in Yugoslavia that could be used to threaten Italy and Greece, both members of NATO. More importantly, Kennan noted that Yugoslavia's policy of "market socialism" gave it a higher standard of living than elsewhere in Eastern Europe, that there was greater freedom of expression there than in other Communist nations, and the existence of a Communist nation in Eastern Europe that was not under the control of the Kremlin was destabilizing to the Soviet bloc as it inspired other communist leaders with the desire for greater independence. With U.S.–Yugoslav relations getting progressively worse, Kennan tendered his resignation as ambassador during late July 1963.

== Academic career and later life ==
In 1957 Kennan was invited by the BBC to give the annual Reith Lectures, a series of six radio lectures which were titled Russia, the Atom and the West. These covered the history, effect, and possible consequences of relations between Russia and the West. After the end of his brief ambassadorial post in Yugoslavia during 1963, Kennan spent the rest of his life in academe, becoming a major realist critic of U.S. foreign policy. Having spent 18 months as a scholar at the Institute for Advanced Study (IAS) between 1950 and 1952, Kennan joined the faculty of the institute's School of Historical Studies in 1956, and spent the rest of his life there.

=== Opposition to the Vietnam War ===
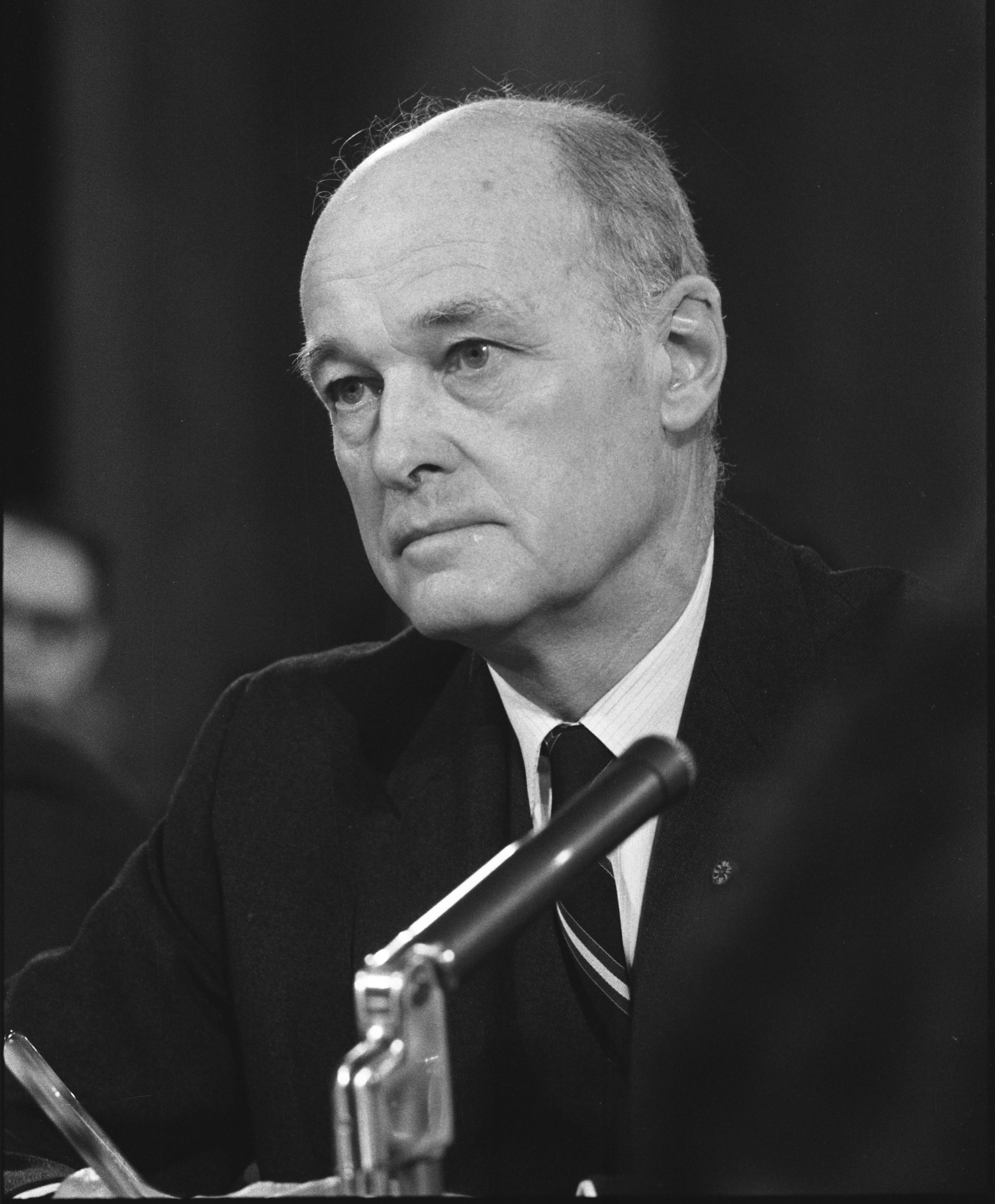
George Kennan testifying before the Senate Foreign Relations Committee in 1966

During the 1960s, Kennan criticized U.S. involvement in Vietnam, arguing that the United States had little vital interest in the region. In February 1966, Kennan testified before the Senate Foreign Relations Committee at the request of the committee's chairman, Senator J. William Fulbright, where he stated that the "preoccupation" with Vietnam was undermining U.S. global leadership. He accused the administration of Lyndon Johnson of distorting his policies into a purely military approach. President Johnson was so annoyed by the hearings called by his friend-turned-foe Fulbright that he tried to upstage them by holding a sudden and unannounced summit in Honolulu starting on 5 February 1966 with Chief of State Nguyễn Văn Thiệu and Prime Minister Nguyễn Cao Kỳ of South Vietnam, where he declared that the United States was making excellent progress in Vietnam and was committed to social and economic reforms. Kennan testified that were the United States not already fighting in Vietnam that: "I would know of no reason why we should wish to become so involved, and I could think of several reasons why we should wish not to".

Kennan was opposed to an immediate pull-out from Vietnam, saying "A precipitate and disorderly withdrawal could represent in present circumstances a disservice to our own interests, and even to world peace", but added that he felt "there is more respect to be won in the opinion of this world by a resolute and courageous liquidation of unsound positions than by the most stubborn pursuit of extravagant and unpromising objectives." In his testimony, Kennan argued that Ho Chi Minh was "not Hitler" and everything he had read about him suggested that Ho was a Communist, but also a Vietnamese nationalist who did not want his country to be subservient to either the Soviet Union or China.

Kennan further testified that to defeat North Vietnam would mean a cost in human life "for which I would not like to see this country be responsible for". Kennan compared the Johnson administration's policy towards Vietnam as being like that of "an elephant frightened by a mouse". Kennan ended his testimony by quoting a remark made by John Quincy Adams: "America goes not abroad in search of monsters to destroy. She is the well-wisher to the freedom and independence of all. She is the champion and vindicator only of her own." Kennan then stated: "Now, gentlemen, I don't know exactly what John Quincy Adams had in mind when he spoke those words. But I think that, without knowing it, he spoke very directly and very pertinently to us here today." The hearings were aired live on television (at the time a rare occurrence), and Kennan's reputation as the "Father of Containment" ensured that his testimony attracted much media attention, all the more so as the Johnson administration professed to be carrying out in Vietnam "containment" policies. Thus Johnson pressured the main television networks not to air Kennan's testimony, and as a result, the CBS network aired reruns of I Love Lucy while Kennan was before the Senate, provoking the CBS director of television programming, Fred Friendly, to resign in protest. By contrast, the NBC network resisted the presidential pressure and did air the proceedings of the Senate Foreign Relations Committee. To counter Kennan's testimony, Johnson sent Secretary of State Dean Rusk before the Senate Foreign Relations Committee where he testified that the war in Vietnam was a morally just struggle to stop "…the steady extension of Communist power through force and threat."

Despite expectations, Kennan's testimony before the Senate attracted high ratings on television. Kennan himself recalled that in the month afterward he received a flood of letters, which led him to write about the public response: "It was perfectly tremendous. I haven't expected anything remotely like this." The columnist Art Buchwald described being stunned to see that his wife and her friends had spent the day watching Kennan testify instead of the standard soap operas, saying that he did not realize that American housewives were interested in such matters. Fulbright's biographer wrote that testimony of Kennan together with General James Gavin was important because they were not "irresponsible students or a wild-eyed radicals," which made it possible for "respectable people" to oppose the Vietnam War. Kennan's testimony in February 1966 was the most successful of his various bids to influence public opinion after leaving the State Department. Before he appeared before the Senate, 63% of the American public approved of Johnson's handling of the Vietnam War; after his testimony, 49% did.

=== Critic of the counterculture ===
Kennan's opposition to the Vietnam War did not mean any sympathy for the student protests against the Vietnam War. In his 1968 book Democracy and the Student Left, Kennan attacked the left-wing university students demonstrating against the Vietnam War as violent and intolerant. Kennan compared the "New Left" students of the 1960s with the Narodnik student radicals of 19th-century Russia, accusing both of being an arrogant group of elitists whose ideas were fundamentally undemocratic and dangerous. Kennan wrote that most of the demands of the student radicals were "gobbledygook" and he charged that their political style was marked by a complete lack of humor, extremist tendencies and mindless destructive urges. Kennan conceded that the student radicals were right to oppose the Vietnam War, but he complained that they were confusing policy with institutions as he argued that just because an institution executed a misguided policy did not make it evil and worthy of destruction.

Kennan blamed the student radicalism of the late 1960s on what he called the "sickly secularism" of American life, which he charged was too materialistic and shallow to allow understanding of the "slow powerful process of organic growth" which had made America great. Kennan wrote that what he regarded as the spiritual malaise of America had created a generation of young Americans with an "extreme disbalance in emotional and intellectual growth." Kennan ended his book with a lament that the America of his youth no longer existed as he complained that most Americans were seduced by advertising into a consumerist lifestyle that left them indifferent to the environmental degradation all around them and to the gross corruption of their politicians. Kennan argued that he was the real radical as: "They haven't seen anything yet. Not only do my apprehensions outclass theirs, but my ideas of what would have to be done to put things right are far more radical than theirs."

In a speech delivered in Williamsburg on 1 June 1968, Kennan criticized the authorities for an "excess of tolerance" in dealing with student protests and rioting by Afro-Americans. Kennan called for the suppression of the New Left and Black Power movements in a way that would be "answerable to the voters only at the next election, but not to the press or even the courts". Kennan argued for "special political courts" be created to try New Left and Black Power activists as he stated that this was the only way to save the United States from chaos. At the same time, Kennan stated that based upon his visits to South Africa: "I have a soft spot in my mind for apartheid, not as practiced in South Africa, but as a concept." Although Kennan disliked the petty, humiliating aspects of apartheid, he had much praise for the "deep religious sincerity" of the Afrikaners whose Calvinist faith he shared while he dismissed the capacity of South African blacks to run their country. Kennan argued in 1968 that a system similar to apartheid was needed for the United States as he doubted the ability of average black American male to operate "in a system he neither understands nor respects," leading him to advocate the Bantustans of South Africa to be used as a model with areas of the United States to be set aside for Afro-Americans. Kennan did not approve of the social changes of the 1960s. During a visit to Denmark in 1970, he came across a youth festival, which he described with disgust as "swarming with hippies—motorbikes, girl-friends, drugs, pornography, drunkenness, noise. I looked at this mob and thought how one company of robust Russian infantry would drive it out of town."

=== Establishment of Kennan Institute ===
Always a student of Russian affairs, Kennan, together with Wilson Center Director James Billington and historian S. Frederick Starr, initiated the establishment of the Kennan Institute at the academic institution named for Woodrow Wilson. The institute is named to honour the American George Kennan, a scholar of the Russian Empire, and a relation of the subject of this article. Scholars at the Institute are meant to study Russia, Ukraine and the Eurasian region.

=== Critic of the arms race ===
Containment, when he published the first volume of his memoirs in 1967, involved something other than the use of military "counterforce". He was never pleased that the policy he influenced was associated with the arms build-up of the Cold War. In his memoirs, Kennan argued that containment did not demand a militarized U.S. foreign policy. "Counterforce" implied the political and economic defense of Western Europe against the disruptive effect of the war on European society. According to him, the Soviet Union exhausted by war posed no serious military threat to the US or its allies at the beginning of the Cold War but was rather an ideological and political rival. Kennan believed that the USSR, Britain, Germany, Japan, and North America remained the areas of vital U.S. interests. During the 1970s and 1980s, as détente was ended particularly under President Reagan, he was a major critic of the renewed arms race.

=== Politics of silence ===
In 1989, President George H. W. Bush awarded Kennan the Medal of Freedom, the nation's greatest civilian honor. Yet he remained a realist critic of recent U.S. presidents, urging in a 1999 interview with The New York Review of Books the U.S. government to "withdraw from its public advocacy of democracy and human rights," saying that the "tendency to see ourselves as the center of political enlightenment and as teachers to a great part of the rest of the world strikes me as unthought-through, vainglorious and undesirable".

=== Opposition to NATO enlargement ===
A key inspiration for American containment policies during the Cold War, Kennan would later describe NATO's enlargement as a "strategic blunder of potentially epic proportions". Kennan opposed the Clinton administration's war in Kosovo and its expansion of NATO (the establishment of which he had also opposed half a century earlier), expressing fears that both policies would worsen relations with Russia.

During a 1998 interview with The New York Times after the U.S. Senate had just ratified NATO's first round of expansion, he said "there was no reason for this whatsoever". He was concerned that it would "inflame the nationalistic, anti-Western and militaristic" opinions in Russia. He said that Russians "will gradually react quite adversely and it will affect their policies". Kennan was also bothered by talks that Russia was "dying to attack Western Europe", explaining that, on the contrary, the Russian people had revolted to "remove that Soviet regime" and that their "democracy was as far advanced" as the other countries that had just signed up for NATO then.

=== Last years ===
Kennan remained vigorous and alert during the last years of his life, although arthritis had him using a wheelchair. During his later years, Kennan concluded that "the general effect of Cold War extremism was to delay rather than hasten the great change that overtook the Soviet Union". At age 98, he warned of the unforeseen consequences of waging war against Iraq. He warned that attacking Iraq would amount to waging a second war that "bears no relation to the first war against terrorism" and declared efforts by the Bush administration to associate Al-Qaeda with Saddam Hussein "pathetically unsupportive and unreliable". Kennan went on to warn:

Anyone who has ever studied the history of American diplomacy, especially military diplomacy, knows that you might start in a war with certain things on your mind as a purpose of what you are doing, but in the end, you found yourself fighting for entirely different things that you had never thought of before ... In other words, war has a momentum of its own and it carries you away from all thoughtful intentions when you get into it. Today, if we went into Iraq, like the president would like us to do, you know where you begin. You never know where you are going to end.

In his final years, Kennan embraced the ideals of the Second Vermont Republic, a secessionist movement incorporated in 2003. Noting the large-scale Mexican immigration to the Southwestern United States, Kennan said in 2002 there were "unmistakable evidences of a growing differentiation between the cultures, respectively, of large southern and southwestern regions of this country, on the one hand", and those of "some northern regions". In the former, "the very culture of the bulk of the population of these regions will tend to be primarily Latin American in nature rather than what is inherited from earlier American traditions ... Could it really be that there was so little of merit [in America] that it deserves to be recklessly trashed in favor of a polyglot mix-mash?" It's argued that Kennan represented throughout his career the "tradition of militant nativism" that resembled or even exceeded the Know Nothings of the 1850s. Kennan also believed American women had too much power.

In February 2004 scholars, diplomats, and Princeton alumni gathered at the university's campus to celebrate Kennan's 100th birthday. Among those in attendance were Secretary of State Colin Powell, international relations theorist John Mearsheimer, journalist Chris Hedges, former ambassador and career Foreign Service officer Jack F. Matlock, Jr., and Kennan's biographer, John Lewis Gaddis. Kennan died on March 17, 2005, at his home in Princeton, New Jersey, aged 101. He was survived by his Norwegian wife Annelise, whom he married in 1931, and his four children, eight grandchildren, and six great-grandchildren. Annelise died in 2008 at the age of 98. In an obituary in The New York Times, Kennan was described as "the American diplomat who did more than any other envoy of his generation to shape United States policy during the cold war" to whom "the White House and the Pentagon turned when they sought to understand the Soviet Union after World War II". Of Kennan, historian Wilson D. Miscamble remarked "[o]ne can only hope that present and future makers of foreign policy might share something of his integrity and intelligence". Foreign Policy described Kennan as "the most influential diplomat of the 20th century". Henry Kissinger said that Kennan "came as close to authoring the diplomatic doctrine of his era as any diplomat in our history", while Colin Powell called Kennan "our best tutor" in dealing with the foreign policy issues of the 21st century.

== Published works ==
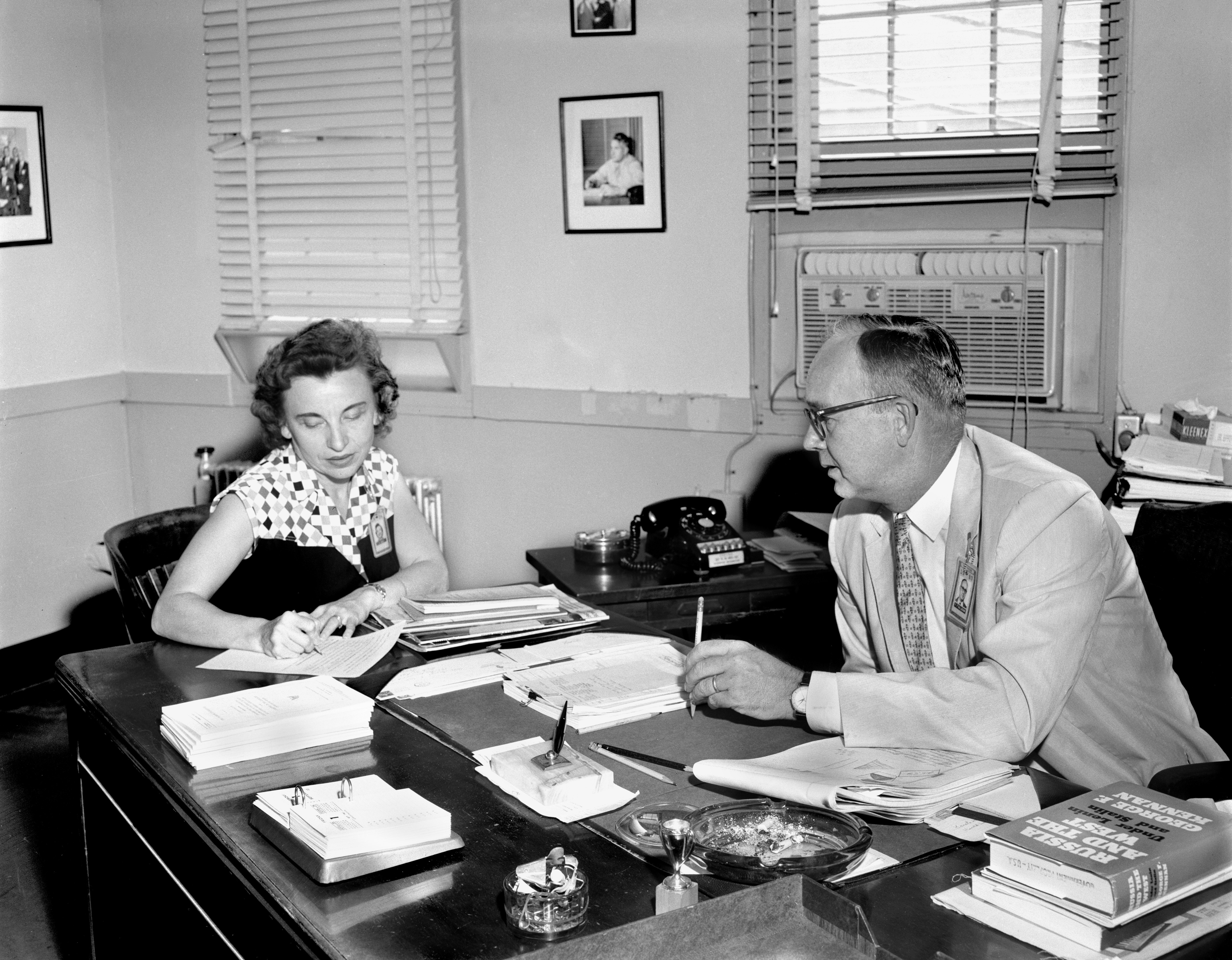
On the desk is George F. Kennan's newly published book, Russia and the West Under Lenin and Stalin, shown here at the Atomic Energy Commission in Oak Ridge in 1961.

During his career at the IAS, Kennan wrote seventeen books and scores of articles on international relations. He won the Pulitzer Prize for History, the National Book Award for Nonfiction, the Bancroft Prize, and the Francis Parkman Prize for Russia Leaves the War, published in 1956. He again won a Pulitzer and a National Book Award in 1968 for Memoirs, 1925–1950. A second volume, taking his reminiscences up to 1963 was published in 1972. Among his other works were American Diplomacy, 1900–1950, Sketches from a Life, published in 1989, and Around the Cragged Hill in 1993.

His properly historical works amount to a six-volume account of the relations between Russia and the West from 1875 to his own time; the period from 1894 to 1914 was planned but not completed. He was chiefly concerned with:

- The folly of the First World War as a choice of policy; he argues that the costs of modern war, direct and indirect, predictably exceeded the benefits of eliminating the Hohenzollerns.
- The ineffectiveness of summit diplomacy, with the Conference of Versailles as a type-case. National leaders have too much to do to give any single matter the constant and flexible attention which diplomatic problems require.
- The Allied intervention in Russia in 1918–1919. He was indignant with Soviet accounts of a vast capitalist conspiracy against the world's first worker's state, some of which do not even mention the First World War; he was equally indignant with the decision to intervene as costly and harmful. He argues that the interventions, by arousing Russian nationalism, may have ensured the survival of the Bolshevik state.

Kennan had a low opinion of President Franklin D. Roosevelt, arguing in 1975: "For all his charm, political skill, and able wartime leadership, when it came to foreign policy Roosevelt was a superficial, ignorant dilettante, a man with a severely limited intellectual horizon."

- "X" (July 1947), "The Sources of Soviet Conduct" , Foreign Affairs, 25 (4): 566–582, doi:10.2307/20030065, JSTOR 20030065
- Kennan, George F. (May 4, 1948), the Inauguration of Political Warfare, Washington D.C.: National Archives and Records Administration, Records of the National Security Council
- Kennan, George F. (1948), Policy Planning Study (PPS) 23, Washington D.C.: Government Printing Office
- Kennan, George F. (1951), American Diplomacy, 1900–1950, Chicago: University of Chicago Press, OCLC 466719
- Kennan, George F. (1954), Realities of American Foreign Policy, Princeton: Princeton University Press, OCLC 475829
- Kennan, George F. (1956), Russia Leaves the War, Princeton: Princeton University Press, OCLC 1106320
- Kennan, George F. (1956), "The Sisson Documents," Journal of Modern History v. 28 (June, 1956), 130–154
- Kennan, George F. (1958), The Decision to Intervene, Princeton: Princeton University Press, OCLC 1106303
- Kennan, George F. (1958), Russia, the Atom, and the West, New York: Harper, OCLC 394718
- Kennan, George F. (1961), Russia and the West under Lenin and Stalin, Boston: Little, Brown and Company, OCLC 253164
- Kennan, George F. (1967), Memoirs: 1925–1950, Boston: Little, Brown and Company, OCLC 484922
- Kennan, George F. (1964).On Dealing with the Communist World, New York and Evanston: Harper & Row for The Council on Foreign Relations, Inc.
- Kennan, George F. (1968), From Prague after Munich: Diplomatic Papers, 1938–1939, Princeton: Princeton University Press, ISBN 0-691-05620-X
- Kennan, George F. (1968), Democracy and the Student Left, Boston: Little, Brown and Company, ISBN 978-0-09-095070-6 – via Internet Archive
- Kennan, George F. (1971), The Marquis de Custine and His 'Russia in 1839', Princeton: Princeton University Press, ISBN 0-691-05187-9
- Kennan, George F. (1972), Memoirs: 1950–1963, Boston: Little, Brown and Company, OCLC 4047526
- Kennan, George F. (1978), The Cloud of Danger: Current Realities of American Foreign Policy, London: Hutchinson, ISBN 0-09-132140-9
- Kennan, George F. (1979), The Decline of Bismarck's European Order: Franco-Russian Relations, 1875–1890, Princeton: Princeton University Press, ISBN 0-691-05282-4
- Kennan, George F. (1982), The Nuclear Delusion: Soviet-American Relations in the Atomic Age, New York: Pantheon Books, ISBN 0-394-52946-4
- Kennan, George F. (1984), The Fateful Alliance: France, Russia, and the Coming of the First World War, New York: Pantheon Books, ISBN 0-394-53494-8
- Kennan, George F. (1989), Sketches from a Life, New York: Pantheon Books, ISBN 0-394-57504-0
- Kennan, George F. (1993), Around the Cragged Hill: A Personal and Political Philosophy, New York: W. W. Norton & Company, ISBN 0-393-31145-7
- Kennan, George F. (1996), At a Century's Ending: Reflections 1982–1995, New York: W. W. Norton & Company, ISBN 0-393-31609-2
- Kennan, George F. (2000), An American Family: The Kennans, the First Three Generations, New York: W. W. Norton & Company, ISBN 0-393-05034-3 – via Internet Archive
- Kennan, George F. (2014), The Kennan Diaries, New York: W. W. Norton & Company, ISBN 978-0-393-07327-0

Correspondence

- John Lukacs (ed.), George F. Kennan and the Origins of Containment, 1944–1946: The Kennan-Lukacs Correspondence (University of Missouri Press, 1997)

== Awards, honors, and legacy ==
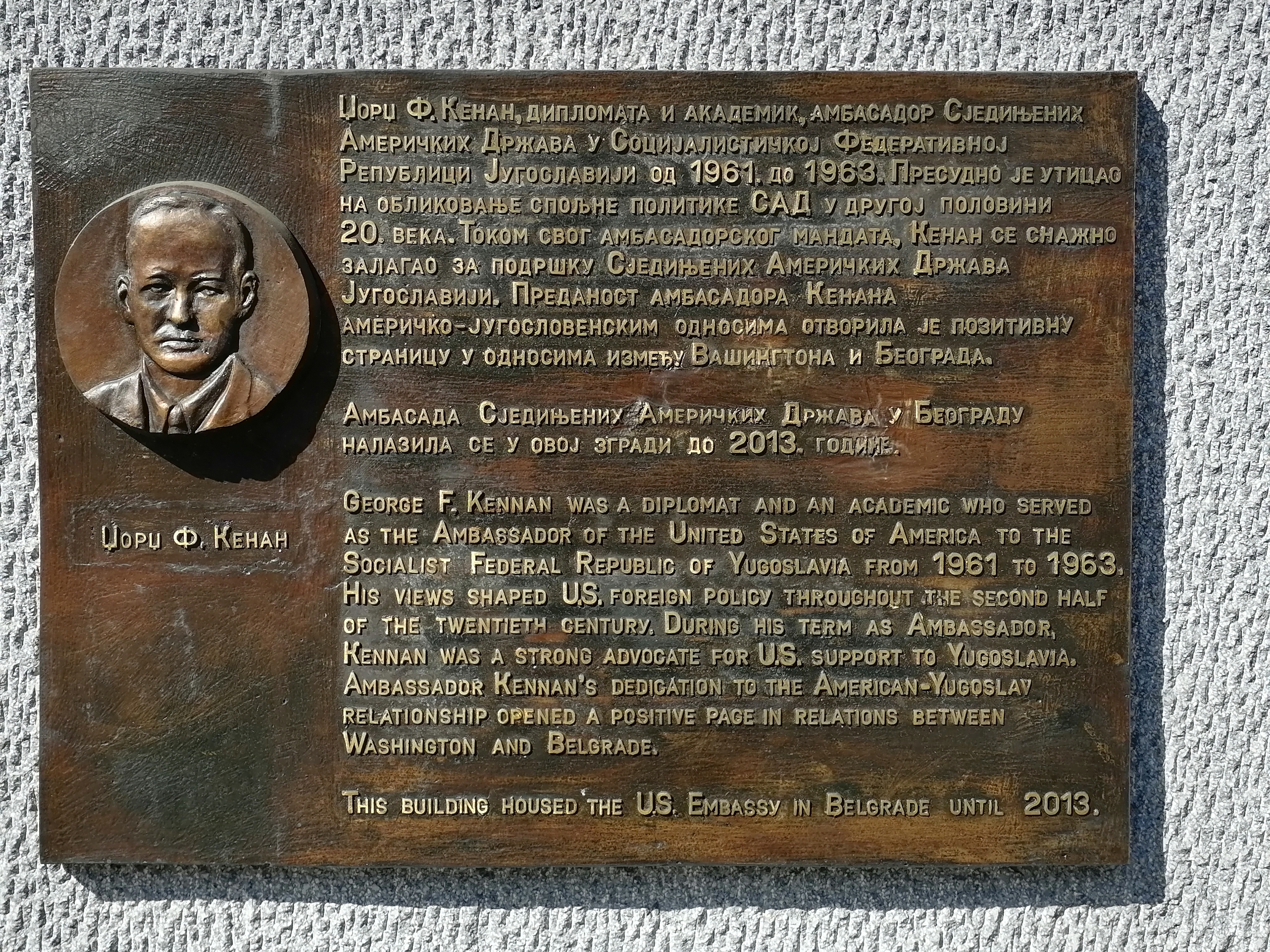
Memorial plaque dedicated to the memory of Kennan in Belgrade

During his career, Kennan received a number of awards and honors. As a scholar and writer, Kennan was a two-time recipient of both the Pulitzer Prizes and the National Book Award, and had also received the Francis Parkman Prize, the Ambassador Book Award and the Bancroft Prize. Among Kennan's numerous other awards and distinctions were his election to both the American Philosophical Society and the American Academy of Arts and Sciences (1952), the Testimonial of Loyal and Meritorious Service from the Department of State (1953), Princeton's Woodrow Wilson Award for Distinguished Achievement in the Nation's Service (1976), the Order of the Pour le Mérite (1976), the Albert Einstein Peace Prize (1981), the Peace Prize of the German Book Trade (1982), the American Academy of Arts and Letters Gold Medal (1984), the American Whig-Cliosophic Society's James Madison Award for Distinguished Public Service(1985), the Franklin D. Roosevelt Foundation Freedom from Fear Medal (1987), the Presidential Medal of Freedom (1989), the Distinguished Service Award from the Department of State (1994), and the Library of Congress Living Legend (2000).

Kennan received 29 honorary degrees and was honored in his name with the George F. Kennan Chair in National Security Strategy at the National War College and the George F. Kennan Professorship at the Institute for Advanced Study. In June 2022, a memorial plaque honoring Kennan was unveiled in Belgrade, Serbia at the site of the former U.S. embassy. Kennan had served in the country when it was part of Yugoslavia, from 1961 to 1963.

== Academic criticism ==
Russell argues that a school of thought known as political realism formed the basis of Kennan's work as a diplomat and historian and remains relevant to the debate over American foreign policy, which since the 19th century has been characterized by a shift from the Founding Fathers' realist school to the idealistic or Wilsonian school of international relations. According to the realist tradition, security is based on the principle of a balance of power, whereas Wilsonianism (considered impractical by realists) relies on morality as the sole determining factor in statecraft. According to the Wilsonians the spread of democracy abroad as a foreign policy is important and morals are valid universally. During the presidency of Bill Clinton, American diplomacy represented the Wilsonian school to such a degree that those instead in favor of realism likened President Clinton's policies to social work. According to Kennan, whose concept of American diplomacy was based on the realist approach, such moralism without regard to the realities of power and the national interest is self-defeating and will result in the decrease of American power.

In his historical writings and memoirs, Kennan laments in great detail the failings of democratic foreign policy makers and those of the United States in particular. According to Kennan, when American policymakers suddenly confronted the Cold War, they had inherited little more than rationale and rhetoric "utopian in expectations, legalistic in concept, moralistic in [the] demand it seemed to place on others, and self-righteous in the degree of high-mindedness and rectitude ... to ourselves". The source of the problem is the force of public opinion, a force that is inevitably unstable, unserious, subjective, emotional, and simplistic. Kennan has insisted that the U.S. public can only be united behind a foreign policy goal on the "primitive level of slogans and jingoistic ideological inspiration". Miscamble argues that Kennan played a critical role in developing the foreign policies of the Truman administration. He also states that Kennan did not hold a vision for either global or strongpoint containment; he simply wanted to restore the balance of power between the United States and the Soviets. Like historian John Lewis Gaddis, Miscamble concedes that although Kennan personally preferred political containment, his recommendations ultimately resulted in a policy directed more toward strongpoint than to global containment.

== See also ==
- Cold War (1947–1953)
- George F. Kennan: An American Life (2011 biography)
- The Hawk and the Dove: Paul Nitze, George Kennan, and the History of the Cold War (2009 dual-biography)
- Kennan Institute for Advanced Russian Studies
- Origins of the Cold War

== Bibliography ==
- Congdon, Lee. George Kennan: A Writing Life (2008)
- Costigliola, Frank. Kennan: A Life Between Worlds (2023), scholarly biography excerpt
  - Logevall, Fredrik, "The Ghosts of Kennan" (review of Frank Costigliola Kennan: A Life between Worlds, Princeton University Press, 2023, 591 pp.) online
  - Hitchcock, William I. (June 2023). "Frank Costigliola, Kennan: A Life Between Worlds: Princeton, 2023, 648 pp., ISBN 978-0691165400". Society. 60 (3): 470–472. doi:10.1007/s12115-023-00827-y.
- Etzold, Thomas H. and Gaddis, John Lewis (1978), "NSC 10/2, "National Security Council Directive on Office of Special Projects," June 18, 1948", Containment: Documents on American Policy and Strategy, 1945–1950, New York: Columbia University Press, pp. 125–128, ISBN 0-231-04399-6.
- Felix, David (2015) Kennan and the Cold War: An Unauthorized Biography. Piscataway, New Jersey: Transaction Publishers.
- Forrestal, James (1951), Millis, Walter; Duffield, E. S. (eds.), The Forrestal Diaries, New York: Viking Press, OCLC 908389.
- Gaddis, John Lewis (2011), George F. Kennan: An American Life, Penguin Press, ISBN 978-1-59420-312-1. (see article)
- Gaddis, John Lewis (1982), Strategies of Containment: A Critical Appraisal of Postwar American National Security Policy, New York: Oxford University Press, ISBN 0-19-503097-4.
- Gaddis, John Lewis (1990), Russia, the Soviet Union, and the United States: An Interpretive History (2nd ed.), New York: McGraw Hill, ISBN 0-07-557258-3.
- Gaddis, John Lewis (1997), We Now Know: Rethinking Cold War History (2nd ed.), Oxford: Clarendon Press, ISBN 0-19-878071-0
- Hixson, Walter L. (1989), George F. Kennan: Cold War Iconoclast, New York: Columbia University Press, ISBN 0-231-06894-8.
- Iatrides, John (Fall 2005), "George F. Kennan and the Birth of Containment: The Greek Test Case", World Policy Journal, 22 (3): 126–145, doi:10.1215/07402775-2005-4005.
- Isaacson, Walter; Thomas, Evan (1986), The Wise Men: Six Friends and the World They Made, New York: Simon & Schuster, ISBN 0-684-83771-4.
- Karnow, Stanley (1983), Vietnam: A History (1st ed.), New York: Viking Press, ISBN 0-670-74604-5.
- Koppes, Clayton (February 2013), "Solving for X: Kennan, Containment, and the Color Line", Pacific Historical Review, 92 (1): 95–118, doi:10.1525/phr.2013.82.1.95.
- LaFeber, Walter (1997), America, Russia, and the Cold War: 1945–1996, Boston: McGraw-Hill, ISBN 0-07-036064-2.
- LaFeber, Walter (2002), America, Russia, and the Cold War: 1945–2002, Boston: McGraw-Hill, ISBN 0-07-284903-7.
- Lukacs, John (2007), George Kennan: A Study of Character, New Haven, Connecticut: Yale University Press, ISBN 978-0-300-12221-3.
- Mayers, David (1990), George Kennan and the Dilemmas of US Foreign Policy, Oxford: Oxford University Press, ISBN 0-19-505139-4.
- Miscamble, Wilson D. (1992), George F. Kennan and the Making of American Foreign Policy, 1947–1950, Princeton: Princeton University Press, ISBN 0-691-02483-9.
- Miscamble, Wilson D. (May 2004), "George Kennan: A Life in the Foreign service", Foreign Service Journal, 81 (2): 22–34, ISSN 1094-8120, archived from the original on May 24, 2006. (alternative link).
- Paterson, Thomas G. (1988), Meeting the Communist Threat: Truman to Reagan, New York: Oxford University Press, p. 122, ISBN 0-19-504532-7.
- Smith, J. Y. (March 18, 2005), "Outsider Forged Cold War Strategy", The Washington Post, archived from the original on January 20, 2011.
- Stephanson, Anders (1989), Kennan and the Art of Foreign Policy, Cambridge: Harvard University Press, ISBN 0-674-50265-5.
- Talbott, Strobe (2002), The Russia Hand: A Memoir of Presidential Diplomacy, New York: Random House, ISBN 0-8129-6846-8.
- Urban, George (September 1976), "From Containment to Self-Containment: A conversation with George Kennan", Encounter.
- Weiner, Tim; Crossette, Barbara (March 18, 2005), "George F. Kennan Dies at 101; Leading Strategist of Cold War", The New York Times, archived from the original on May 2, 2015.

Further reading

- Colman, Jonathan, Britain's 'Mr X': Sir Frank Roberts and the Making of British Foreign Policy, 1930-68 (Manchester: Manchester University Press, 2025). Explores the relationship between Kennan and Roberts, who worked closely with one another in Moscow, 1945–46, but whose views had diverged greatly within a few years.
- Pickett, William B. (2004). George F. Kennan and the Origins of Eisenhower's New Look: An Oral History of Project Solarium (PDF). Princeton, N.J.: Princeton Institute for International and Regional Studies, Princeton University. OCLC 55497101. Archived from the original (PDF) on October 29, 2013.
- Pickett, William B. (June 1985). "The Eisenhower Solarium Notes". The SHAFR Newsletter. 16. Society for Historians of American Foreign Relations: 1–10.

Diplomatic posts
Preceded by Alan G. Kirk	United States Ambassador to the Soviet Union; 1952	Succeeded by Charles E. Bohlen
