= Wilson D. Miscamble =

American Professor and Historian

The Reverend Wilson D. Miscamble CSC

Personal details
- Born: Wilson D. Miscamble; December 17, 1953 (age 72) Roma, Queensland, Australia
- Education: University of Queensland (BA, MA); University of Notre Dame, PhD), (MDiv)

Wilson "Bill" Miscamble (born December 17, 1953) is an American Catholic priest of the Congregation of Holy Cross and a Professor of History at the University of Notre Dame in Indiana. He was previously a North American Analyst in Australia's Office of National Assessments. In addition to his scholarship on American Cold War Foreign Policy, Miscamble is known for his 2019 biography of Notre Dame President Theodore Hesburgh.

== Early life and career ==
Miscamble was raised in Roma, Queensland, Australia. He earned his B.A. from the University of Queensland in 1973, before completing his M.A. three years later. He went on to earn his Ph.D. from the University of Notre Dame in 1987. After earning his Ph.D., Miscamble served as a North American Analyst in the Office of National Assessments, Department of Prime Minister and Cabinet, Canberra, Australia.

In 1982, Miscamble returned to the United States to join the Congregation of Holy Cross, and was ordained a Roman Catholic priest in 1988. He taught at Notre Dame from 1986 to 1988, before serving as a visiting fellow at Yale University from 1989 to 1990. He was named an Associate Professor of History at Notre Dame in 1992 and has been a full Professor since 2007. He has taken up a number of visiting appointments at institutions across the United States, including Yale, Providence College, and the University of Saint Mary of the Lake. From 1993 to 1998 he chaired the Notre Dame History Department.

Miscamble's research interests center around American foreign policy since the Second World War and the role of Catholics in 20th century U.S. foreign relations. He has received the Harry S. Truman Book Award twice. The first award coming in 1993 for George F. Kennan and the Making of American Foreign Policy, 1947-1950, and the second in 2008 for From Roosevelt to Truman: Potsdam, Hiroshima and the Cold War His 2011 book 'The Most Controversial Decision: Truman, the Atomic Bombs and the Defeat of Japan', caused some concern among some American Catholics, who felt his argument did not take Catholic moral philosophy into account. Believing his arguments to be misrepresented, he has written multiple clarifications of his views on the bombings, emphasizing that "evaluated in isolation, each atomic bombing was a deeply immoral act deserving of condemnation." He goes on to say that he rejects a utilitarian view of the bombings, but sympathizes with President Truman, who was faced with "neither a clear nor an easy 'moral' option."

== Selected works ==
- George F. Kennan and the Making of American Foreign Policy, 1947-1950. Princeton, NJ: Princeton University Press, 1993. ISBN 9780691024837
- Keeping the Faith, Making a Difference. Notre Dame, IN: Ave Maria Press, 2000. ISBN 0877939330
- Go Forth and Do Good. Notre Dame, IN: University of Notre Dame Press, 2003. ISBN 9780268035259
- From Roosevelt to Truman. Cambridge, UK: Cambridge University Press, 2007. ISBN 0521728584
- The Most Controversial Decision: Truman, the Atomic Bombs and the Defeat of Japan. Cambridge, UK: Cambridge University Press, 2011. ISBN 052173536X
- American Priest: The Ambitious Life and Conflicted Legacy of Notre Dame's Father Ted Hesburgh. New York: Image, 2019. ISBN 1984823434
