= American Diplomacy, 1900–1950 =

1951 book by George F. Kennan

- Author: George F. Kennan
- Language: English
- Publisher: University of Chicago Press
- Publication date: 1951
- Publication place: United States
- Pages: 154

American Diplomacy, 1900–1950, also published as just American Diplomacy, is a 1951 book by the American diplomat George F. Kennan. It consists the 1950 Walgreen Lectures Kennan delivered at the University of Chicago, as well as two magazine articles. Kennan analyzed the diplomacy conducted by the United States in the first half of the 20th century, criticizing what he called a "legalistic-moralistic" tradition that leads to the creation of devastating wars.

The book established Kennan as a major American proponent of realism in international relations. It was for a period widely read, but did not influence American policy makers. In 1984, Kennan delivered two lectures at Grinnell College where he looked back at his Walgreen Lectures and concluded that the tendency he criticized only had intensified in the post-war period. These lectures have been included in subsequent editions of American Diplomacy, 1900–1950.
