= List of After Words interviews first aired in 2012 =

After Words is an American television series on the C-SPAN2 network’s weekend programming schedule known as Book TV. The program is an hour-long talk show, each week featuring an interview with the author of a new nonfiction book. The program has no regular host. Instead, each author is paired with a guest host who is familiar with the author or the subject matter of their book.

First air date (Links to video)	Interviewee(s)	Interviewer(s)	Book	Topic of interview / Comments
January 7, 2012	Jack Abramoff	Eliza Newlin Carney	Capitol Punishment: The Hard Truth About Washington Corruption From America's Most Notorious Lobbyist	
January 14, 2012	Chris Matthews	Sam Donaldson	Jack Kennedy: Elusive Hero	John F. Kennedy
January 21, 2012	George Nash	Richard Norton Smith	Freedom Betrayed: Herbert Hoover's Secret History of the Second World War and Its Aftermath	
January 28, 2012	Zbigniew Brzezinski	Michael Hirsch	Strategic Vision: America and the Crisis of Global Power	Foreign policy of the United States
February 4, 2012	Deborah Scroggins	Akbar Ahmed	Wanted Women	Ayaan Hirsi Ali, Aafia Siddiqui
February 13, 2012	Eric Klinenberg	Kim Blankenship	Going Solo: The Extraordinary Rise and Surprising Appeal of Living Alone	
February 18, 2012	Ira Shapiro	Bernie Sanders	The Last Great Senate: Courage and Statesmanship in Times of Crisis	
February 25, 2012	Richard Thompson Ford	Suzanne Nossel	Universal Rights Down to Earth	
March 3, 2012	John Lewis Gaddis	Susan Glasser	George F. Kennan: An American Life	George Kennan
March 12, 2012	Maggie Anderson	Krissah Thompson	Our Black Year: One Family's Quest to Buy Black in America's Racially Divided Economy	Black capitalism
March 17, 2012	Linda Killian	Michael Tomasky	The Swing Vote: The Untapped Power of Independents	Independent voters
March 24, 2012	Craig Timberg	Scott Evertz	Tinderbox: How the West Sparked the AIDS Epidemic and How the World Can Finally Overcome It	
March 31, 2012	Alain de Botton	Chris Hedges	Religion for Atheists: A Non-Believer's Guide to the Uses of Religion	Atheism and religion
April 9, 2012	Liza Mundy	April Ryan	The Richer Sex: How the New Majority of Female Breadwinners is Transforming Sex, Love and Family	
April 14, 2012	Dick Teresi	Sally Satel	The Undead: Organ Harvesting, the Ice-Water Test, Beating-Heart Cadavers - How Medicine is Blurring the Line Between Life and Death	Ethics of Organ Transplantation
April 21, 2012	Dale Carpenter	David Savage	Flagrant Conduct: The Story of Lawrence v. Texas	Lawrence v. Texas
May 5, 2012	Seth Jones	Kimberly Dozier	Hunting in the Shadows: The Pursuit of Al Qa'ida Since 9/11	Al Qaeda
May 12, 2012	Van Jones	Jackie Kucinich	Rebuild the Dream	
May 19, 2012	Jay Nordlinger	Matt Murray	Peace, They Say: A History of the Nobel Peace Prize, The Most Famous and Controversial Prize in the World	Nobel Peace Prize
May 28, 2012	Victor Cha	Scott Snyder	The Impossible State: North Korea, Past and Future	North Korea
June 2, 2012	Steve Coll	Dina Cappiello	Private Empire: ExxonMobil and American Power	ExxonMobil
June 10, 2012	Madeleine Albright	Ann Blackman	Prague Winter: A Personal Story of Remembrance and War, 1937-1948	
June 23, 2012	Katie Pavlich	Major Garrett	Fast and Furious: Barack Obama's Bloodiest Scandal and Its Shameless Cover-Up	ATF gunwalking scandal
June 30, 2012	Fawaz Gerges	Phyllis Bennis	Obama and the Middle East: The End of America's Moment?	
July 7, 2012	Martha Rosenberg	Stephanie Beasley	Born with a Junk Food Deficiency: How Flaks, Quacks, and Hacks Pimp the Public Health	
July 14, 2012	Peter Collier	Angela Stent	Political Woman: The Big Little Life of Jeane Kirkpatrick	Jeane Kirkpatrick
July 18, 2012	Jonah Goldberg	Nia-Malika Henderson	The Tyranny of Clichés: How Liberals Cheat in the War of Ideas	
July 23, 2012	Kaitlin Bell Barnett	Judith Warner	Dosed: The Medication Generation Grows Up	
July 28, 2012	Fredrick C. Harris	Charlton McIlwain	The Price of the Ticket: Barack Obama and the Rise and Decline of Black Politics	
August 5, 2012	David Crist	Ellen Laipson	The Twilight War: The Secret History of America's Thirty-Year Conflict with Iran	Iran–United States relations
August 12, 2012	Edward Conard	Michael Ettlinger	Unintended Consequences: Why Everything You've Been Told About the Economy is Wrong	
August 18, 2012	John Fund and Hans von Spakovsky	Linda Killian	Who's Counting?: How Fraudsters and Bureaucrats Put Your Vote at Risk	
August 26, 2012	John Corvino and Maggie Gallagher		Debating Same-Sex Marriage	Corvino and Gallagher interviewed each other about the book they co-wrote, in which they espoused opposing views on Same-sex marriage.
September 2, 2012	Donald Barlett and James Steele	Juan Williams	The Betrayal of the American Dream	
September 9, 2012	Kofi Annan	Katty Kay	Interventions: A Life in War and Peace	
September 16, 2012	Anton Treuer	Jacqueline Pata	Everything You Wanted to Know About Indians but Were Afraid to Ask	Native Americans in the United States
September 22, 2012	Richard Miniter	Karlyn Bowman	Leading from Behind: The Reluctant President and the Advisors Who Decide for Him	
September 29, 2012	Sasha Issenberg	Nancy Jacobson	The Victory Lab: The Secret Science of Winning Campaigns	
October 7, 2012	John Jenkins	Joan Biskupic	The Partisan: The Life of William Rehnquist	William Rehnquist
October 13, 2012	Marguerite Guzman	Amy Goodman	The Invisible Wounds of War: Coming Home from Iraq and Afghanistan	
October 20, 2012	Hanna Rosin	Tucker Carlson	The End of Men - and the Rise of Women	
October 28, 2012	David Coleman	James Hershberg	The Fourteenth Day: JFK and the Aftermath of the Cuban Missile Crisis	
November 4, 2012	Salman Khan	Nina Rees	The One World Schoolhouse: Education Reimagined	Khan Academy
November 10, 2012	David Cay Johnston	Jayne O'Donnell	The Fine Print: How Big Companies Use "Plain English" and Other Tricks to Rob You Blind	
November 17, 2012	James T. Patterson	Daryl Scott	The Eve of Destruction: How 1965 Transformed America	1965 in the United States
November 25, 2012	Gautam Mukunda	Richard Brookhiser	Indispensable: When Leaders Really Matter	
December 1, 2012	Ray Kurzweil	Ingrid Wickelgren	How to Create a Mind: The Secret of Human Thought Revealed	
December 8, 2012	Marty Makary	Richard Davies	Unaccountable: What Hospitals Won't Tell You and How Transparency Can Revolutionize Health Care	
December 15, 2012	Cynthia Lowen	Donna Lieberman	Bully: An Action Plan for Teachers and Parents to Combat the Bullying Epidemic in America	Bullying
December 22, 2012	Craig Whitney	Paul Helmke	Living with Guns: A Liberal's Case for the Second Amendment	
December 29, 2012	Oliver Stone and Peter Kuznick	Michael Kazin	The Untold History of the United States	
