= List of international trips made by Madeleine Albright as United States Secretary of State =

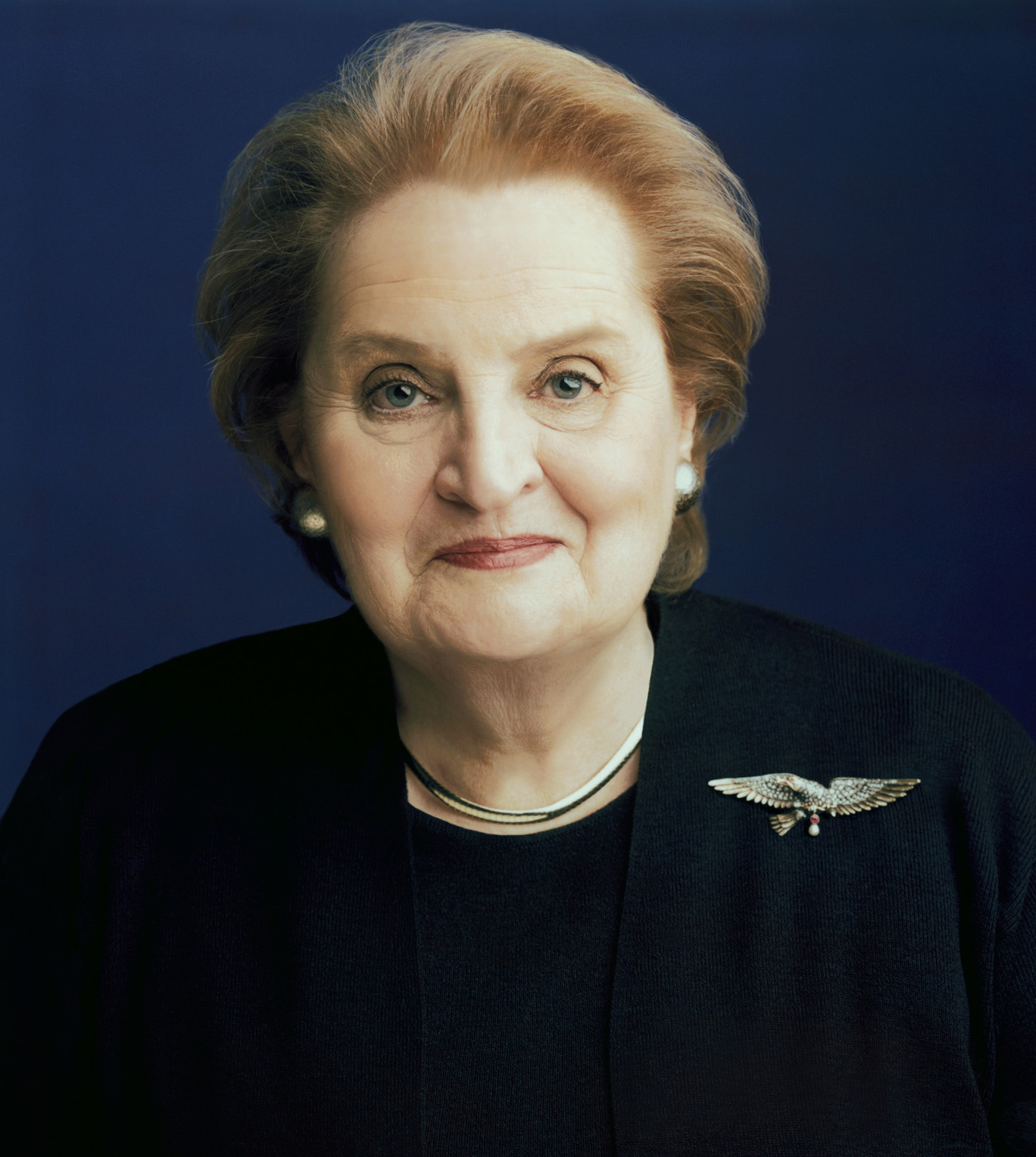
Official portrait of Madeleine Albright as Secretary of State, 1997

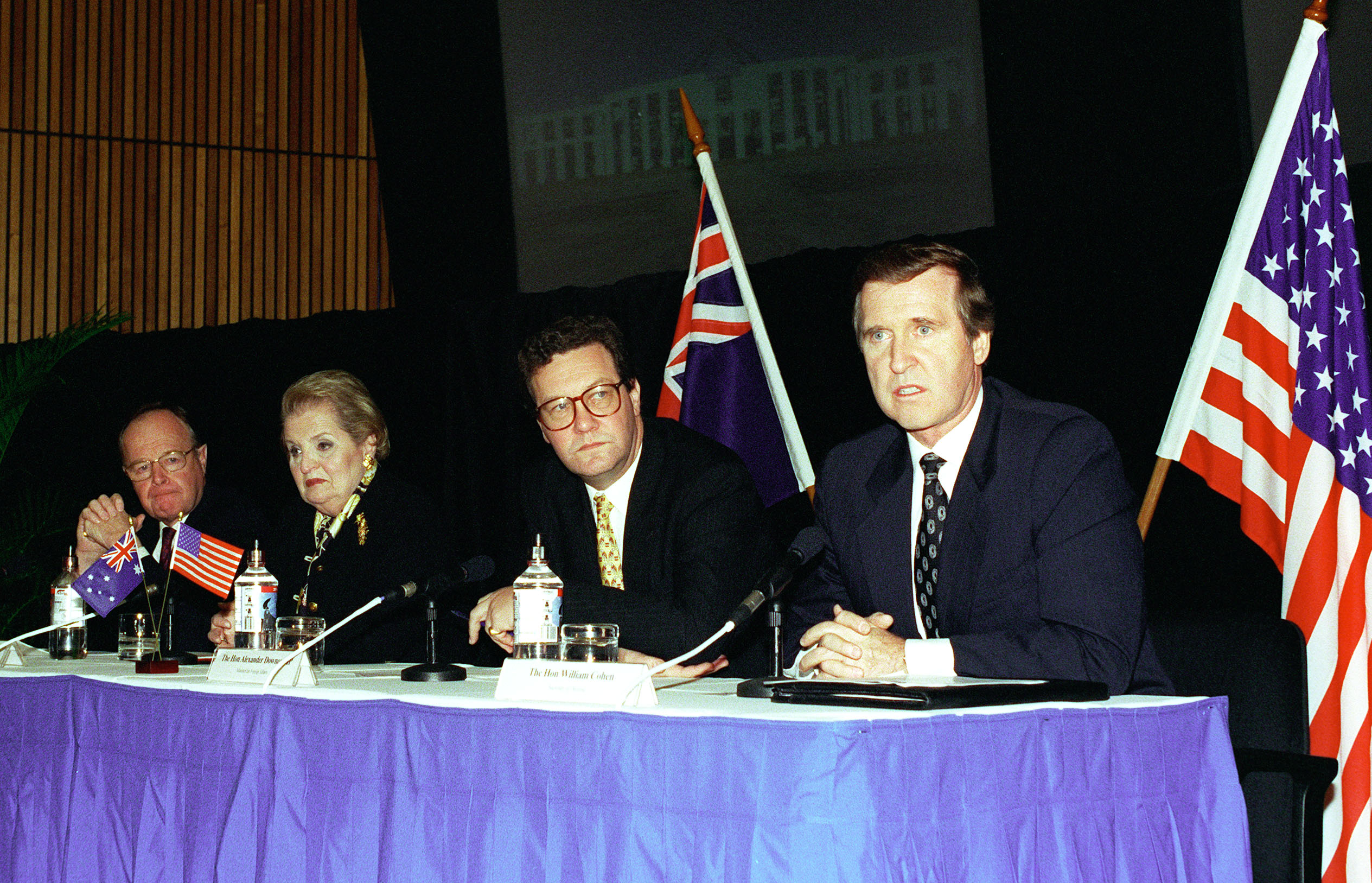
Secretary Albright and Defense Secretary William S. Cohen with Australian Minister of Defense Ian McLachlan and Australian Minister for Foreign Affairs Alexander Downer in Sydney, 1998

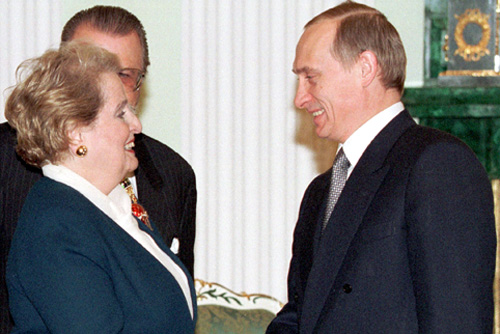
Secretary Albright with Russian president Vladimir Putin in the Kremlin, 2000

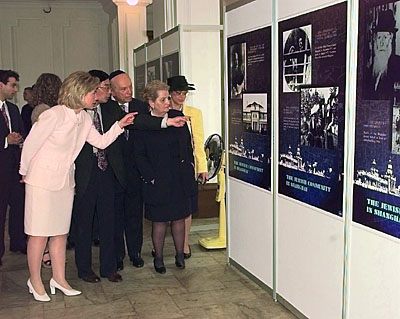
First Lady Hillary Clinton and Secretary Madeleine Albright tour the Ohel Rachel Synagogue in Shanghai

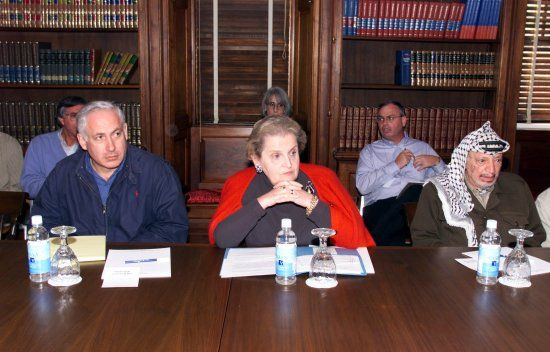
Secretary Albright with Israeli prime minister Benjamin Netanyahu and Palestinian leader Yasser Arafat, 1998

This is a list of international visits undertaken by Madeleine Albright (in office 1997–2001) while serving as the 64th United States secretary of state. The list includes both private travel and official state visits. The list includes only foreign travel which she made during her tenure in the position.

== Summary ==
The number of visits per country or territory where Secretary Albright traveled are:

- One visit to Albania, Algeria, Angola, Australia, Bangladesh, Barbados, Bolivia, Botswana, Brunei, Congo, Costa Rica, Cyprus, Ecuador, Ethiopia, Greece, Guinea, Hong Kong, Hungary, Iceland, Indonesia, Kazakhstan, Kyrgyzstan, Lithuania, Luxembourg, Macedonia, Mali, Mauritius, Mongolia, Morocco, Netherlands, Netherlands Antilles, Nigeria, North Korea, Oman, Panama, Papua New Guinea, Philippines, Qatar, Rwanda, Sierra Leone, Slovakia, Trinidad and Tobago, Uganda, Uzbekistan and Zimbabwe
- Two visits to Argentina, Bahrain, Brazil, Bulgaria, Canada, Chile, Colombia, Finland, Guatemala, Haiti, Ireland, Kenya, Kuwait, Lebanon, Malaysia, New Zealand, Norway, Pakistan, Poland, Romania, Singapore, Slovenia, South Africa, Tanzania, Thailand, Turkey, Ukraine, Venezuela and Vietnam
- Three visits to Austria, Czech Republic, FR Yugoslavia, India, Jordan and Portugal
- Four visits to Croatia, Mexico, South Korea, Spain, Syria and Vatican City
- Five visits to Bosnia and Herzegovina, China and Japan
- Seven visits to Saudi Arabia
- Eight visits to the Palestinian National Authority, Russia and Switzerland
- Nine visits to Egypt and Israel
- Ten visits to Belgium and Italy
- Eleven visits to Germany
- Fourteen visits to the United Kingdom
- Fifteen visits to France

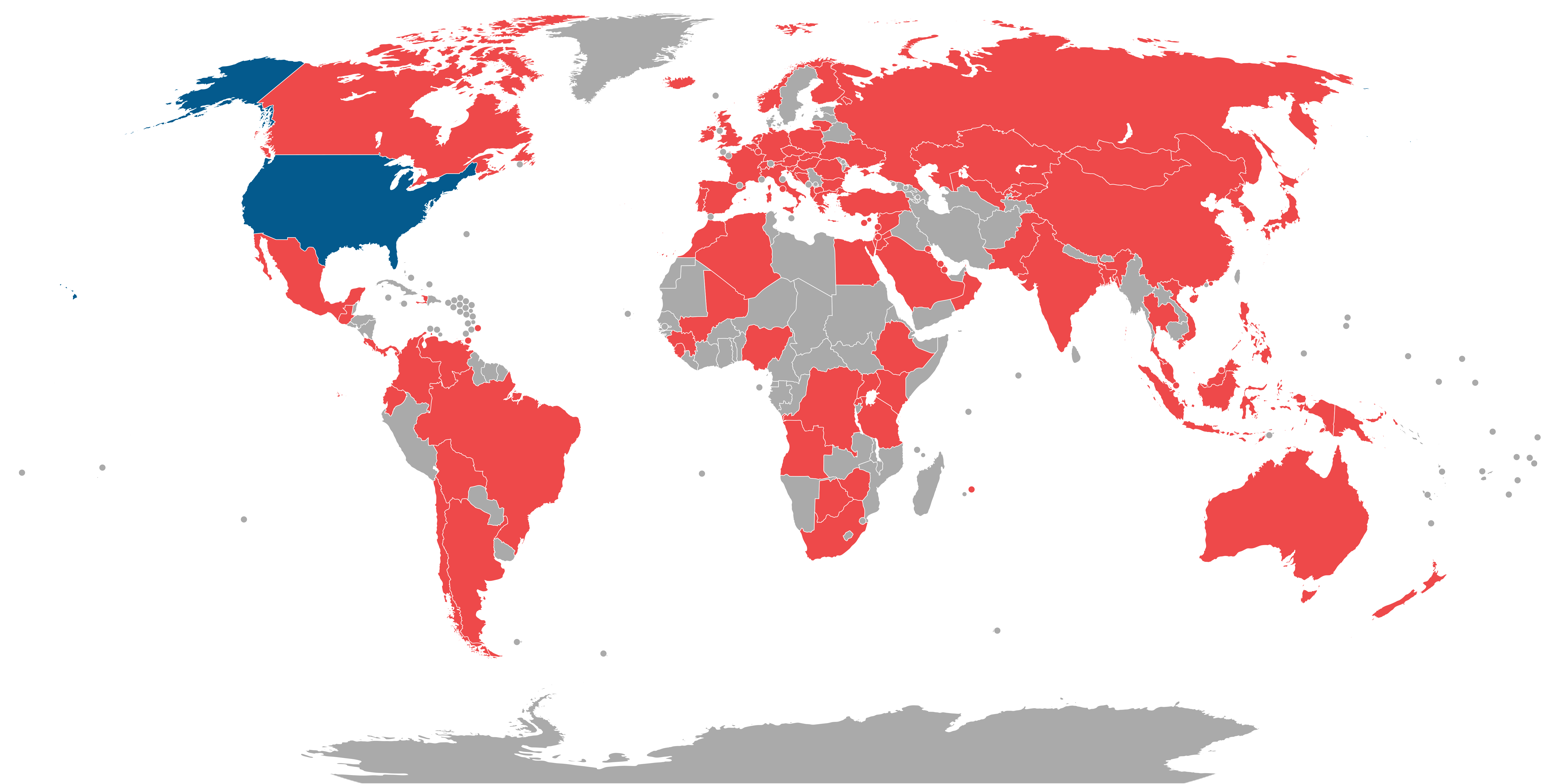
World map highlighting countries visited by Madeleine Albright as Secretary of State, 1997–2001: United States Countries visited No visits

== Table ==
	Country	Locations	Details	Dates
1	Italy	Rome	Met with Prime Minister Prodi and Foreign Minister Dini.	February 16, 1997
1	Germany	Bonn	Met with Chancellor Kohl and Foreign Minister Kinkel	February 16–17, 1997
1	France	Paris	Met with President Chirac, Prime Minister Juppé, and Foreign Minister de Charette.	February 17–18, 1997
1	Belgium	Brussels	Addressed NATO Foreign Ministers and the European Commission.	February 18, 1997
1	United Kingdom	London	Met with Prime Minister Major and Foreign Secretary Rifkind.	February 18–19, 1997
1	Russia	Moscow	Met with President Yeltsin, Prime Minister Chernomyrdin, and Foreign Minister Primakov.	February 19–21, 1997
1	South Korea	Seoul, Camp Bonifas, Panmunjon	Met with President Kim, and Foreign Minister Yoo, and visited U.S. troops at the Demilitarized Zone.	February 21–23, 1997
1	Japan	Tokyo	Met with Prime Minister Hashimoto and senior officials.	February 23–24, 1997
1	China	Beijing	Met with President Jiang and senior Chinese officials.	February 24, 1997
2	Finland	Helsinki	Accompanied President Clinton to a summit meeting with Russian President Yeltsin.	March 20–21, 1997
3	Russia	Moscow	Met with Foreign Minister Primakov.	May 1–2, 1997
4	Guatemala	Guatemala City, Tuluche	Signed agreement on cross-border auto thefts and visited a demobilization camp.	May 4, 1997
4	Mexico	Mexico City	Accompanied President Clinton on a State Visit and attended a meeting of the U.S.–Mexico Binational Commission.	May 5–7, 1997
4	Costa Rica	San José	Accompanied President Clinton to a Summit Meeting with the Presidents of the Central American Republics.	May 7–9, 1997
4	Barbados	Bridgetown	Accompanied President Clinton to a U.S.–Caribbean Community Summit Meeting.	May 9–11, 1997
5	France	Paris	Accompanied President Clinton to the signing of the NATO–Russia Founding Act.	May 26–27, 1997
5	Netherlands	The Hague	Accompanied President Clinton to the U.S.–EU Summit Meeting, commemorated the 50th anniversary of the Marshall Plan, and visited the UN War Crimes Tribunal.	May 27–28, 1997
5	Portugal	Sintra	Attended NATO Ministerial Meeting, the inaugural meeting of the Euro–Atlantic Partnership Council, and a meeting of the Bosnian Peace Implementation Council. Also met with the Co–Presidents of Bosnia.	May 29–30, 1997
5	Croatia	Zagreb, Prevrać	Met with President Tuđman and appealed for the return of Serb refugees.	May 30–31, 1997
5	FR Yugoslavia	Belgrade	Met with President Milošević.	May 31 – June 1, 1997
5	Bosnia and Herzegovina	Sarajevo, Brcko, Banja Luka	Met with the Collective Presidency, dedicated a bridge over the Sava River, and met with Bosnian Serb President Plavšić.	June 1, 1997
6	Vietnam	Hanoi, Ho Chi Minh City	Met with Prime Minister Kiệt and senior Vietnamese officials. Laid cornerstone of a new Consulate in Ho Chi Minh City.	June 26–29, 1997
6	Hong Kong	Hong Kong	Attended the transfer of sovereignty from the United Kingdom to China.	June 29 – July 1, 1997
7	Spain	Madrid	Attended NATO Summit Meeting.	July 7–10, 1997
7	Poland	Warsaw	Accompanied President Clinton.	July 10–11, 1997
7	Romania	Bucharest	Accompanied President Clinton.	July 11–12, 1997
7	Slovenia	Ljubljana	Met with Foreign Minister Thaler.	July 12, 1997
7	Russia	Saint Petersburg	Met with Foreign Minister Primakov.	July 12–13, 1997
7	Lithuania	Vilnius	Met with the foreign ministers of the Baltic states.	July 13, 1997
7	Czech Republic	Prague	Met with President Havel and visited the Pinkas Synagogue.	July 13–14, 1997
8	Malaysia	Kuala Lumpur	Attended ASEAN Post–Ministerial Conference and Regional Forum.	July 26–29, 1997
8	Singapore	Singapore	Stopped while returning to the U.S.	July 29–30, 1997
9	Czech Republic	Letohrad, Kostelec nad Orlicí, Terezín	Visiting the birthplaces of her parents and the site of the concentration camp where her grandparents were held.	August 31 – September 2, 1997
10	Israel	Tel Aviv, Jerusalem	Met with Prime Minister Netanyahu and senior Israeli officials.	September 9–12, 1997
10	Palestinian National Authority	Ramallah	Met with Chairman Arafat.	September 11–12, 1997
10	Syria	Damascus	Met with President Assad.	September 12, 1997
10	Egypt	Alexandria	Met with President Mubarak.	September 12–13, 1997
10	Saudi Arabia	Jeddah, Abha	Met with King Fahd and Crown Prince Abdullah, with Gulf Cooperation Council Foreign Ministers, and visited U.S. military personnel.	September 13–14, 1997
10	Jordan	Amman	Met with King Hussein.	September 14–15, 1997
10	Cyprus	Larnaca	Stopped en route to Beirut.	September 15, 1997
10	Lebanon	Beirut	Met with President Hrawi and senior Lebanese officials; addressed Beirut Forum.	September 15, 1997
11	Venezuela	Caracas	Accompanied President Clinton.	October 12–13, 1997
11	Brazil	Brasília, São Paulo, Rio de Janeiro	Accompanied President Clinton.	October 13–15, 1997
11	Argentina	Buenos Aires	Accompanied President Clinton.	October 15–17, 1997
11	Haiti	Port-au-Prince	Met with President Préval and Haitian political leaders.	October 17, 1997
12	United Kingdom	Edinburgh, London	Discussed the Iraq crisis with Foreign Secretary Cook, and the Middle East peace process with Israeli prime minister Netanyahu.	November 14–15, 1997
12	Switzerland	Bern	Discussed the Middle East peace process with PLO Chairman Arafat.	November 15, 1997
12	Qatar	Doha	Attended the Middle East–North African Economic Conference.	November 15–16, 1997
12	Bahrain	Manama	Met with UN weapons inspectors formerly stationed in Iraq.	November 16, 1997
12	Kuwait	Kuwait City	Discussed the Iraq crisis with senior Kuwaiti officials	November 16, 1997
12	Saudi Arabia	Riyadh	Discussed the Iraq crisis with senior Saudi officials.	November 16–17, 1997
12	Pakistan	Islamabad, Peshawar	Met with Prime Minister Sharif and visited an Afghan refugee camp.	November 17–18, 1997
12	India	New Delhi	Met with senior Indian officials.	November 18–19, 1997
12	Switzerland	Geneva	Discussed Iraq crisis with the Foreign Ministers of Britain, France, and Russia.	November 19–20, 1997
12	Canada	Vancouver	Attended APEC Foreign and Trade Ministerial and Summit Meetings.	November 21–25, 1997
13	France	Paris	Met with Israeli prime minister Netanyahu.	December 5–6, 1997
13	Switzerland	Geneva	Met with PLO Chairman Arafat.	December 6, 1997
13	France	Paris	Met with Israeli prime minister Netanyahu and French Foreign Minister Védrine.	December 6–8, 1997
13	Ethiopia	Addis Abeba	Addressed the Economic Commission of the Organization of African Unity.	December 8–10, 1997
13	Uganda	Kampala, Gulu	Met with President Museveni, northern Ugandan refugees, and Sudanese opposition leaders.	December 10–11, 1997
13	Rwanda	Kigali	Met with President Bizimungu and Vice President Kagame.	December 11, 1997
13	Congo, Democratic Republic of the	Kinshasa	Met with President Kabila.	December 11–12, 1997
13	Angola	Luanda	Discussed Lusaka peace process with President Dos Santos	December 12, 1997
13	South Africa	Pretoria, Cape Town	Met with President Mandela	December 12–14, 1997
13	Zimbabwe	Harare	Met with President Mugabe.	December 14–15, 1997
13	Belgium	Brussels	Attended NATO Foreign Ministers' Meeting and meetings of the NATO–Ukraine Commission, the Euro–Atlantic Partnership Council, and the NATO–Russia Permanent Joint Council.	December 15–17, 1997
13	France	Paris	Met with President Chirac and with Israeli prime minister Netanyahu.	December 17–18, 1997
13	United Kingdom	London	Met with PLO Chairman Arafat.	December 18, 1997
14	Bosnia and Herzegovina	Sarajevo, Tuzla	Accompanied President Clinton to meetings with Bosnian officials and U.S. military personnel.	December 21–22, 1997
14	Belgium	Brussels	Stopped en route to London.	December 22, 1997
14	United Kingdom	London	Private visit.	December 22–30, 1997
15	France	Paris	Discussed the Iraq crisis with Foreign Minister Védrine.	January 29–30, 1998
15	Spain	Madrid	Discussed the Iraq crisis with Russian Foreign Minister Primakov.	January 30, 1998
15	United Kingdom	London, Ascot	Discussed the Iraq crisis with British Foreign Secretary Cook and King Hussein of Jordan	January 30–31, 1998
15	Israel	Jerusalem	Discussed the Middle East peace process with Prime Minister Netanyahu.	January 31 – February 1, 1998
15	Palestinian National Authority	Ramallah	Discussed the Middle East peace process with Chairman Arafat.	February 1, 1998
15	Kuwait	Kuwait City	Discussed the Iraq crisis with Emir al-Sabah.	February 1, 1998
15	Saudi Arabia	Riyadh	Discussed the Iraq crisis with Crown Prince Abdullah.	February 1–2, 1998
15	Bahrain	Manama	Discussed the Iraq crisis with Foreign Minister Khalifa.	February 2–3, 1998
15	Egypt	Cairo	Discussed the Iraq crisis with President Mubarak and Foreign Minister Moussa.	February 3, 1998
16	Ukraine	Kyiv	Met with President Kuchma and signed nuclear cooperation agreement.	March 6, 1998
16	Italy	Rome	Discussed the Kosovo crisis with Prime Minister Prodi and Foreign Minister Dini.	March 6–8, 1998
16	Vatican City State	Vatican City	Discussed the Kosovo crisis with Pope John Paul II.	March 7, 1998
16	Germany	Bonn	Discussed the Kosovo crisis with Foreign Minister Kinkel.	March 8, 1998
16	France	Paris	Discussed the Kosovo crisis with Foreign Minister Védrine.	March 8, 1998
16	United Kingdom	London	Discussed the Kosovo crisis with representatives of the Contact Group.	March 8–9, 1998
16	Spain	Madrid	Discussed the Iraq crisis with Foreign Minister Matutes.	March 9, 1998
16	Canada	Ottawa, Hull	Met with Prime Minister Chrétien and Foreign Minister Axworthy.	March 9–10, 1998
17	Italy	Rome	Discussed the Kosovo crisis with Foreign Minister Dini.	March 24, 1998
17	Vatican City State	Vatican City	Discussed the Kosovo crisis and the situation in Cuba with Vatican officials.	March 24, 1998
17	Germany	Bonn	Attended a Contact Group ministerial meeting.	March 24–25, 1998
18	Haiti	Port-au-Prince, Jacmel	Met with President Préval and Haitian political leaders. Discussed narcotics control with Haitian and Dominican officials aboard USCG Dallas.	April 4, 1998
18	Trinidad and Tobago	Crown Point, Port of Spain	Met with Prime Minister Panday and with Caricom Foreign Ministers.	April 4–6, 1998
19	Chile	Santiago de Chile	Accompanied President Clinton on a state visit and to the Second Summit of the Americas.	April 16–19, 1998
20	Japan	Tokyo	Met with Prime Minister Hashimoto and Foreign Minister Obuchi. Signed amended Acquisitions and Cross-Servicing Agreement.	April 28–29, 1998
20	China	Beijing	Met with President Jiang and senior Chinese officials and made arrangements for President Clinton's state visit.	April 29 – May 1, 1998
20	South Korea	Seoul	Met with President Kim and senior Korean officials.	May 1–2, 1998
20	Mongolia	Ulaanbaatar	Met with President Bagabandi and senior Mongolian officials and addressed the Great Hural.	May 2, 1998
20	United Kingdom	London	Met with Prime Minister Blair, Israeli prime minister Netanyahu, and PLO Chairman Arafat. Attended G-8 Foreign Ministers' Meeting.	May 3–9, 1998
21	United Kingdom	London	Attended U.S.–EU Summit Meeting and met with PLO Chairman Arafat	May 17–18, 1998
21	Switzerland	Geneva	Attended ceremonies commemorating the 50th anniversary of GATT.	May 18, 1998
22	Luxembourg	Luxembourg	Attended NATO Ministerial Meeting.	May 28–29, 1998
23	Venezuela	Caracas	Attended OAS General Assembly meeting.	June 1–2, 1998
24	Switzerland	Geneva	Discussed the India–Pakistan nuclear crisis with the foreign ministers of the permanent member states of the UN Security Council.	June 4, 1998
25	United Kingdom	London	Discussed the South Asian nuclear crisis and the Kosovo crisis with the G-8 Foreign Ministers.	June 12, 1998
26	China	Xi'an, Beijing, Shanghai, Guilin, Hong Kong	Accompanied President Clinton on a State Visit.	June 25 – July 3, 1998
26	Japan	Tokyo	Met with Prime Minister Hashimoto and Foreign Minister Obuchi.	July 3–4, 1998
27	Philippines	Manila	Attended ASEAN Regional Forum and Post–Ministerial Conference. Met with Russian Foreign Minister Primakov.	July 26–29, 1998
27	Papua New Guinea	Port Moresby	Met with Prime Minister Skate and announced additional U.S. humanitarian assistance.	July 29, 1998
27	Australia	Sydney	Attended Australia–U.S. Ministerial Meeting.	July 29 – August 1, 1998
27	New Zealand	Auckland	Met with Prime Minister Shipley.	August 1, 1998
28	Italy	Rome	Was to have attended wedding of Spokesman James Rubin; returned to Washington after bombings of U.S. Embassies in Kenya and Tanzania.	August 7, 1998
29	Germany	Ramstein, Landstuhl	Visited Embassy personnel wounded in the bombings in Kenya and Tanzania; accompanied the dead back to the United States.	August 12–13, 1998
30	Tanzania	Dar es Salaam	Visited site of the U.S. Embassy.	August 18, 1998
30	Kenya	Nairobi	Visited site of the U.S. Embassy and met with President Moi.	August 18, 1998
31	Croatia	Zagreb	Met with President Tuđman and Croatian politicians and journalists.	August 29–30, 1998
31	Bosnia and Herzegovina	Bijeljina, Sarajevo, Tuzla	Met with Bosnian, Bosnian Serb, and NATO officials.	August 30–31, 1998
31	Russia	Moscow	Attended U.S.–Russian Summit Meeting.	August 31 – September 3, 1998
31	Austria	Vienna	Official visit. Attended U.S.–European Union ministerial meeting and addressed the OSCE Permanent Council.	September 3, 1998
32	Israel	Jerusalem	Discussed the Middle East peace process with Prime Minister Netanyahu.	October 6–7, 1998
32	Palestinian National Authority	Jericho, Erez	Discussed the Middle East peace process with Chairman Arafat.	October 6, 1998
32	Belgium	Brussels	Discussed the Kosovo crisis with NATO officials.	October 7–8, 1998
32	United Kingdom	London	Discussed the Kosovo crisis with Contact Group Foreign Ministers.	October 8, 1998
33	Malaysia	Kuala Lumpur	Attended APEC Ministerial Meeting and met with the wife of former deputy prime minister Anwar Ibrahim.	November 14–15, 1998
34	Belgium	Brussels	Attended NATO Ministerial meeting, and ministerial meetings of the Euro–Atlantic Partnership Council, NATO–Russia Permanent Joint Council, and NATO–Ukraine Commission.	December 8–9, 1998
34	France	Lyon, Paris	Announced opening of the American Presence Post in Lyon. Met with President Chirac and senior French officials.	December 9–10, 1998
34	Israel	Jerusalem, Masada	Accompanied President Clinton.	December 12–15, 1998
34	Palestinian National Authority	Gaza Strip, Erez	Accompanied President Clinton. On December 15, attended meeting with Prime Minister Netanyahu and Chairman Arafat.	December 14–15, 1998
34	Jordan	Amman	Discussed the Middle East peace process with Crown Prince Hassan.	December 15, 1998
35	Russia	Moscow	Discussed strategic arms limitations and the Kosovo crisis with Prime Minister Primakov.	January 25–27, 1999
35	Egypt	Cairo	Discussed the Iraq crisis with President Mubarak and Foreign Minister Moussa.	January 27, 1999
35	Saudi Arabia	Riyadh	Discussed the Iraq crisis with King Fahd and senior Saudi officials and addressed U.S. military personnel.	January 27–28, 1999
35	Jordan	Amman	Briefed Crown Prince Abdullah on the Iraq crisis.	January 28, 1999
35	United Kingdom	London	Attended a meeting of Contact Group Foreign Ministers.	January 28–29, 1999
36	United Kingdom	London	Attended a meeting of Contact Group Foreign Ministers.	February 5, 1999
37	France	Paris, Rambouillet	Met with Contact Group Foreign Ministers and with the delegations to the Kosovo peace conference.	February 13–14, 1999
37	Mexico	Mérida	Accompanied President Clinton during a State Visit.	February 15, 1999
38	France	Paris, Rambouillet	Attended the Kosovo peace conference.	February 20–23, 1999
39	China	Beijing	Met with President Jiang and senior Chinese officials.	February 28 – March 2, 1999
39	Thailand	Chiang Mai, Bangkok	Visited the Hill Tribes Institute in Chiang Mai; met with senior Thai officials.	March 2–4, 1999
39	Indonesia	Jakarta	Met with senior Indonesian officials and East Timor leader Xanana Gusmão.	March 4–5, 1999
39	United Kingdom	London	Discussed the U.S. peace plan for Kosovo with special envoy Dole and Foreign Secretary Cook.	March 6, 1999
40	Guatemala	Antigua	Attended Central American Summit Meeting.	March 10–11, 1999
41	Belgium	Brussels	Attended NATO Ministerial meeting on the Kosovo crisis.	April 11–13, 1999
41	Norway	Oslo	Met with Russian Foreign Minister Ivanov.	April 13, 1999
42	Belgium	Brussels	Accompanied President Clinton to meetings with senior NATO officials.	May 4, 1999
42	Germany	Bonn	Attended a G-8 Foreign Ministers meeting on the Kosovo conflict.	May 4–6, 1999
43	Germany	Bonn, Cologne	Attended a G-8 Foreign Ministers meeting on the Kosovo conflict and the G-8 and U.S.–EU Ministerial meetings; met with Kosovar political leaders.	June 6–11, 1999
43	Belgium	Brussels	Briefed senior NATO officials on the Kosovo peace agreement.	June 8, 1999
43	Macedonia	Skopje, Stenkovec	Visited a refugee camp and addressed U.S. military personnel.	June 11, 1999
44	Finland	Helsinki	Met with the Russian Foreign and Defense Ministers to discuss a Russian role in peacekeeping in Kosovo; met with President Ahtisaari.	June 17–18, 1999
44	France	Paris	Met with senior French officials.	June 19–20, 1999
44	Germany	Cologne	Attended G-8 Economic Summit meeting.	June 20–21, 1999
44	Slovenia	Ljubljana	Accompanied President Clinton and met with Montenegrin President Djukanović.	June 21–22, 1999
44	Bulgaria	Sofia	Working visit.	June 22, 1999
44	Romania	Bucharest	Working visit.	June 22, 1999
45	Austria	Vienna	Vacation	July 1–10, 1999
46	Japan	Tokyo	Stopped en route to ASEAN Ministerial meetings.	July 23–24, 1999
46	Singapore	Singapore	Attended ASEAN Regional Forum, ASEAN Post–Ministerial Conference, and trilateral ministerial consultations with Japan and South Korea. Met with Russian Foreign Minister Ivanov.	July 24–27, 1999
46	Saudi Arabia	Dhahran	Stopped en route to Rome.	July 27, 1999
46	Italy	Rome, Aviano	Met with Foreign Minister Dini. Joined President Clinton July 30 at Aviano Air Force Base for visit to Sarajevo.	July 28–30, 1999
46	Vatican City State	Vatican City	Met with Secretary for Relations with States Tauran.	July 28, 1999
46	FR Yugoslavia	Pristina	Met with UN and NATO officials, U.S. military personnel, and representatives of the people of Kosovo.	July 29, 1999
46	Bosnia and Herzegovina	Sarajevo	Attended Stability Pact Leaders Conference.	July 30, 1999
46	Italy	Aviano	Stopped en route to U.S. from Sarajevo.	July 30, 1999
47	Morocco	Rabat	Met with King Mohammed VI and Prime Minister Youssoufi.	September 1–2, 1999
47	Egypt	Alexandria	Met with President Mubarak, Foreign Minister Moussa, and Palestinian Authority Chairman Arafat.	September 2, 1999
47	Israel	Tel Aviv, Jerusalem	Discussed the Israeli–Palestinian peace process with senior Israeli officials.	September 2–4, 1999
47	Palestinian National Authority	Gaza Strip	Discussed the Israeli–Palestinian peace process with senior Palestinian Authority officials.	September 3, 1999
47	Syria	Damascusb	Discussed the Israeli–Palestinian peace process with President Assad and Foreign Minister Sharaa.	September 4, 1999
47	Lebanon	Beirut	Met with Prime Minister al-Hoss.	September 4, 1999
47	Egypt	Sharm el-Sheikh	Attended the signing of the Israel-Palestinian Peace Process Agreement.	September 4, 1999
47	Israel	Jerusalem	Overnight stop before traveling to Turkey.	September 4–5, 1999
47	Turkey	Istanbul, İzmit	Discussed disaster relief with Foreign Minister Cem.	September 5, 1999
47	Vietnam	Hanoi, Ho Chi Minh City	Met with senior Vietnamese officials and opened new U.S. Consulate General in Ho Chi Minh City.	September 6–8, 1999
47	New Zealand	Auckland	Attended APEC Ministerial and Leaders meetings.	September 8–13, 1999
48	Guinea	Conakry	Met with President Conté.	October 18, 1999
48	Sierra Leone	Freetown, Murray Town	Met with President Kabbah, former rebel leaders, and ECOMOG and UNOMSIL officials; visited the Amputee and War Wounded Camp at Murray Town.	October 18, 1999
48	Mali	Bamako	Met with President Konaré and reviewed ACRI forces.	October 18–19, 1999
48	Nigeria	Abuja, Kano	Met with President Obasanjo, senior Nigerian officials, representatives of ECOWAS, and officials and political leaders of northern Nigeria.	October 19–20, 1999
48	Kenya	Nairobi	Met with President Moi and inaugurated a new Embassy building. Also met with IGAD representatives and representatives of Sudanese civil society.	October 20–23, 1999
48	Tanzania	Dar es Salaam	Attended the state funeral of former president Nyerere. Met with President Mkapa and President Buyoya of Burundi.	October 21, 1999
49	Norway	Oslo	Accompanied President Clinton on a State visit to commemorative ceremony for former Israeli prime minister Rabin.	November 1–2, 1999
50	Turkey	Ankara, Efesos, Istanbul	Accompanied President Clinton on a State visit; attended OSCE Summit meeting in Istanbul.	November 14–19, 1999
50	Greece	Athens	Accompanied President Clinton on a State visit.	November 19–20, 1999
50	Italy	Florence	Accompanied President Clinton to conference on Progressive Governance for the 21st Century.	November 20–21, 1999
50	Slovakia	Bratislava	Met with President Schuster, Prime Minister Dzurinda, and other senior officials.	November 22, 1999
50	Bulgaria	Sofia	Joined President Clinton for meetings with senior Bulgarian officials.	November 22–23, 1999
50	FR Yugoslavia	Pristina	Accompanied President Clinton; visited Refugee camps.	November 23, 1999
51	Saudi Arabia	Riyadh	Met with King Fahd and Crown Prince Abdullah.	December 6–7, 1999
51	Syria	Damascus	Met with President Assad and Foreign Minister Sharaa.	December 7, 1999
51	Israel	Jerusalem	Met with Prime Minister Barak and senior Israeli officials.	December 7–9, 1999
51	Palestinian National Authority	Bethlehem, Ramallah	Met with Chairman Arafat.	December 8, 1999
51	Egypt	Sharm el-Sheikh	Met with President Mubarak and Foreign Minister Moussa.	December 9, 1999
52	Germany	Berlin	Attended G-8 Foreign Ministers meeting; met with President Djukanovic of Montenegro and Serbian opposition leaders.	December 17, 1999
52	France	Paris	Met with Foreign Minister Védrine.	December 17–18, 1999
53	Colombia	Cartagena	Discussed anti–narcotics assistance with President Pastrana.	January 14–15, 2000
53	Panama	Panama City	Met with President Moscoso; visited Panama Canal.	January 15, 2000
53	Mexico	Oaxaca	Met with Foreign Minister Green.	January 15–16, 2000
54	Switzerland	Davos	Attended meeting of the World Economic Forum.	January 29–31, 2000
54	Russia	Moscow	Official visit; led U.S. delegation to Multilateral Steering Group.	January 31 – February 2, 2000
54	Croatia	Zagreb	Met with Prime Minister Račan and Croatian political leaders.	February 2, 2000
55	Croatia	Zagreb	Led the U.S. delegation to the inauguration of President Mesić. Met with Serbian opposition leaders.	February 18–19, 2000
55	Albania	Tirana	Met with President Meidani and Prime Minister Meta; addressed the Albanian Parliament.	February 19, 2000
56	Portugal	Lisbon	Attended U.S.–European Union Ministerial meeting.	March 4–5, 2000
56	Czech Republic	Prague, Brno, Hodonín	Met with President Havel and senior officials, commemorated the 150th birthday of former president Thomas Masaryk; met with representatives of Serbian NGOs.	March 5–8, 2000
56	Bosnia and Herzegovina	Sarajevo, Brčko, Banja Luka	Met with Bosnian political leaders and International community representatives; inaugurated Brcko Statute.	March 8–9, 2000
56	Belgium	Brussels	Met with European Union representatives; dedicated new USEU chancery.	March 9–10, 2000
57	Italy	Venice	Attended Aspen Institute Italia "European Dialogue" conference; met with Foreign Minister Dini.	March 18–19, 2000
57	India	New Delhi, Agra	Accompanied President Clinton.	March 19–23, 2000
57	Bangladesh	Dhaka	Accompanied President Clinton.	March 20, 2000
57	Switzerland	Geneva	Addressed the UN Human Rights Commission; met with Foreign Minister Deiss.	March 23, 2000
57	India	Mumbai	Accompanied President Clinton.	March 24–25, 2000
57	Pakistan	Islamabad	Accompanied President Clinton to meetings with President Musharraf and senior officials.	March 25, 2000
57	Oman	Masqat	Accompanied President Clinton.	March 25, 2000
57	Switzerland	Geneva	Accompanied President Clinton to meetings with President Assad of Syria.	March 26, 2000
58	Ukraine	Kyiv	Met with President Kuchma and Foreign Minister Trasyuk.	April 14–15, 2000
58	Kazakhstan	Astana, Almaty	Official visit. Met with President Nazarbayev and senior officials.	April 15–16, 2000
58	Kyrgyzstan	Bishkek	Official visit. Met with President Akayev	April 16, 2000
58	Uzbekistan	Tashkent, Samarkand, Bukhara	Met with President Kamilov, senior officials, and members of non-governmental organizations.	April 16–19, 2000
59	Italy	Florence	Attended NATO Foreign Ministers' meeting; NATO–Russia Permanent Joint Council, Euro–Atlantic Partnership Council, and NATO–Ukraine Commission meetings.	May 24–26, 2000
59	United Kingdom	London	Addressed the London School of Economics.	May 26, 2000
60	Portugal	Lisbon	Accompanied President Clinton to the U.S.–EU Summit Meeting and to a meeting with Israeli prime minister Barak.	May 30 – June 1, 2000
60	Germany	Berlin, Aachen	Accompanied President Clinton.	June 1–3, 2000
60	Russia	Moscow	Accompanied President Clinton to a Summit meeting.	June 3–5, 2000
60	Israel	Jerusalem	Discussed the Middle East peace process with Prime Minister Barak and senior Israeli officials.	June 5–7, 2000
60	Palestinian National Authority	Ramallah	Discussed the Middle East peace process with Chairman Arafat.	June 6, 2000
60	Egypt	Cairo	Met with President Mubarak and the Foreign Ministers of Egypt, Syria, and Oman.	June 7, 2000
60	Ireland	Shannon	Stopped en route return to Washington.	June 7, 2000
61	Syria	Damascus	Attended the funeral of President Assad.	June 13, 2000
62	China	Beijing	Met with President Jiang and senior Chinese officials.	June 22–23, 2000
62	South Korea	Seoul	Met with President Kim Dae-jung and senior Korean officials	June 23–24, 2000
62	Poland	Warsaw, Gdańsk	Attended Ministerial Panel on Democracy and International Organizations and the World Forum for Democracy; received an honorary degree from the University of Gdańsk.	June 24–27, 2000
62	Israel	Jerusalem	Discussed the Middle East peace process with Prime Minister Barak and senior Israeli officials.	June 27–29, 2000
62	Palestinian National Authority	Ramallah	Discussed the Middle East peace process with Chairman Arafat.	June 28, 2000
62	Germany	Berlin	Delivered an address on democracy in the Balkans.	June 29, 2000
63	Thailand	Bangkok	Attended ASEAN Regional Forum and Post–Ministerial Conference; met with North Korean foreign minister Paek Nam Sun.	July 28–29, 2000
63	Japan	Tokyo, Miyazaki	Met with Prime Minister Mori and Foreign Minister Kōno; attended the dedication of Albright Hall in Miyazaki.	July 29–31, 2000
63	Russia	Yekaterinburg	Stopped en route to Rome.	July 31, 2000
63	Italy	Rome	Met with Foreign Minister Dini and Montenegrin President Đukanović.	July 31 – August 2, 2000
63	Vatican City State	Vatican City	Briefed Cardinal Foreign Minister Tauran on the Middle East peace process.	August 1, 2000
63	Ireland	Shannon	Stopped en route to the United States.	August 2, 2000
64	Brazil	Brasília	Met with President Cardoso and Foreign Minister Lampreia.	August 15, 2000
64	Argentina	Buenos Aires	Met with President De la Rúa and Foreign Minister Giavarini.	August 15–17, 2000
64	Chile	Santiago de Chile	Met with President Lagos and Foreign Minister Alvear.	August 17–18, 2000
64	Bolivia	La Paz	Met with President Banzer and Foreign Minister de la Rocha.	August 18, 2000
64	Ecuador	Quito	Met with President Noboa and the Foreign and Defense Ministers.	August 18–19, 2000
64	Netherlands Antilles	Curaçao	Stopped en route to Washington.	August 19, 2000
65	Colombia	Cartagena	Accompanied President Clinton.	August 30, 2000
66	Iceland	Reykjavík, Keflavík	Discussed NATO issues with Foreign Minister Ásgrímsson.	September 30, 2000
66	France	Bordeaux, Paris	Opened American Presence Post at Bordeaux; attended U.S.–EU Ministerial Meeting and met with President Chirac.	October 1–3, 2000
66	Germany	Dresden	Attended ceremonies commemorating the 10th anniversary of German reunification.	October 3, 2000
66	France	Paris	Discussed the Israeli–Palestinian conflict with Prime Minister Barak and Chairman Arafat.	October 3–5, 2000
66	Egypt	Sharm el-Sheikh	Discussed the Israeli–Palestinian conflict with President Mubarak, Foreign Minister Moussa, and Chairman Arafat.	October 5, 2000
67	Egypt	Sharm el-Sheikh	Accompanied President Clinton to the Israeli–Palestinian Summit Meeting.	October 16–17, 2000
67	Saudi Arabia	Riyadh	Discussed the Middle East peace process with King Fahd and senior officials; also met with Syrian president Bashar Assad.	October 17–18, 2000
68	North Korea	Pyongyang	Met with Chairman Kim Jong-il and senior officials.	October 23–25, 2000
68	South Korea	Seoul	Met with President Kim Dae-jung and the Foreign Ministers of South Korea and Japan.	October 25–26, 2000
69	Brunei	Bandar Seri Begawan	Accompanied President Clinton to the APEC Leaders' Meeting.	November 14–16, 2000
70	Austria	Vienna	Attended OSCE Ministerial Council meeting.	November 26–27, 2000
71	Mexico	Mexico City	Led the U.S. delegation to the inauguration of President Fox.	November 30 – December 2, 2000
72	South Africa	Cape Town, Pretoria	Met with President Mbeki and Foreign Minister Zuma; delivered addresses on public health issues.	December 7–9, 2000
72	Mauritius	Port Louis	Met with Prime Minister Jugnauth.	December 9–10, 2000
72	Botswana	Gaborone	Met with President Mogai and Foreign Minister Marafhe.	December 10–12, 2000
72	Algeria	Algiers	Witnessed the signing of the Ethiopia–Eritrea Peace Agreement.	December 12, 2000
72	Hungary	Budapest	Met with Prime Minister Orbán and Foreign Minister Martonyi; received an honorary degree from Szeged University.	December 12–13, 2000
72	Belgium	Brussels	Attended NATO and NATO–Russia Permanent Joint Council Ministerial meetings.	December 13–16, 2000
73	Spain	Madrid	Met with King Juan Carlos and signed Joint Declaration.	January 11, 2001
73	France	Paris	Met with Foreign Minister Védrine and other European Foreign Ministers.	January 11–13, 2001
