= Ethics of organ transplantation =

In bioethics, ethics of organ transplantation refers to the ethical concerns on organ transplantation procedures . Both the source and method of obtaining the organ to transplant are major ethical issues to consider, as well as the notion of distributive justice.

== Sources ==
Organ harvesting from live people is one of the most frequently discussed debate topics in organ transplantation. The World Health Organization argues that transplantation promotes health, but the notion of “transplantation tourism” has the potential to violate human rights or exploit the poor, to have unintended health consequences, and to provide unequal access to services, all of which ultimately may cause harm. Thus, the WHO called to ban compensated organ transplanting and asked member states to protect the most vulnerable from transplant tourism and organ trade. However, as disincentives becomes a must, adding incentives back, such as improving life condition for organ donors after donation, becomes difficult.

Regardless of the “gift of life”, in the context of developing countries, this might be coercive. The practice of coercion could be considered exploitative of the poor population, violating basic human rights according to Articles 3 and 4 of the Universal Declaration of Human Rights. For example, in the history of major transplant countries, organs from executed prisoners are used to develop their techniques. This practice was condemned by bioethicists and was gradually abandoned and replaced by donation systems

A powerfully-argued opposing view, that properly and effectively regulated trade (markets) in organs could ensure that the seller is fully informed of all the consequences of donation, is a mutually beneficial transaction between two consenting adults, and that prohibiting it could itself be interpreted as violating Articles 3 and 29 of the Universal Declaration of Human Rights.

Even within developed countries there is concern that enthusiasm for increasing the supply of organs may trample on respect for the right to life. The question is made even more complicated by the fact that the "irreversibly" criterion for legal death cannot be adequately defined and can easily change with changing technology. As controversies on the boundary of life and death grow, the debate on when to terminate end-of-life care and start organ harvesting ensues.

Controversies also raise on how to assume consent of organ donation for dead people. In practice most countries, have legislation allowing for implied consent, asking people to opt out of organ donation instead of opt in, but allow family refusals.

There are fewer debates on animal sources, as historically laboratory animals have been used to develop organ transplantation technologies for prolonging human life, such as using animal organs in xenotransplantation on human. Nevertheless, animal rights activists have objections on what they see as trading off the rights of animals to live their own lives (deontology) for rationalized ends of replacing an organ or a dialysis machine in a sufferer, where many organ donations fail. Further, organ harvesting in bear farms abuses animals. Religious groups and ethical vegetarians may object on purity grounds to transplantation as violating natural boundaries found in nature.

Researchers currently explore prospects of using 3D printing or stem cells to produce organs, but some such research projects have been crictised for their use of human embryos taken through abortions, as in controversies about Planned Parenthood's selling of fetal organs and tissues for research.

== Distribution ==
Scarcity of replacement organs, currently only from living or dead organ donors rather than factories, and insufficient for demand, results in a growing waiting list of patients and ethical issues in allocation. In 1994, E. H. Kluge objected to the equal access principle based on his argument that people whose need are uncontrollable should be preferred over people who choose a poor lifestyle. Donor matching intended to optimize life-years gained is also subject to debate, as people value their organ and the remainder of their lives differently. In practice, organ and tissue banks often choose patients in ways that secure their revenue, whereas “altruistic” clinics may not have the income necessary to fund their own needs, let alone to support research and development to improve quality and availability of care

People with intellectual disabilities have historically been excluded from organ transplantation waitlists. A 1993 study by Levenson and Olbrisch found transplant centers were more likely to exclude people with intellectual disabilities from certain types of organ transplants (i.e. heart, liver, and kidney) and if they had more severe intellectual disability compared to those with more moderate intellectual disability. Current commentary on the ethics or organ distribution opposes the absolute exclusion and encourages an individualized interdisciplinary assessment.
