= Competing goods =

The balance of Competing goods is a philosophical problem involving the acknowledgement of multiple social values that may at times conflict with one another.

The 20th-century philosopher Martha Nussbaum invokes Aristotle in her discussions of the problem, writing that "[T]he Aristotelian agent scrutinizes each valuable alternative, seeking out its distinct nature. She is determined to acknowledge the precise sort of value or goodness present in each of competing alternatives, seeing each value, so to speak, as a separate jewel in the crown, valuable in its own right, which does not cease to be separately valuable just because the contingencies of the situation sever it from other goods and it loses out in an overall rational choice."; and that Aristotle saw that "the values that are constitutive of a good human life are plural and incommensurable". Nussbaum has argued that Immanuel Kant and Thomas Aquinas were mistaken when they dismissed conflicts of obligation as illogical.

Michael Jinkins, citing Isaiah Berlin, sees both Plato and Aristotle as endorsing the concept of a singular, overwhelming social good and Machiavelli's works as seminal discussions of competing social goods.

The issue has arisen in the medical professions, since patients may not necessarily rank their potential cures above their other values.
