= Prague Winter =

2012 book by Madeleine Albright

- Author: Madeleine Albright
- Language: English
- Subject: History, World War II, Jewish families
- Genre: Autobiography
- Set in: Czech Republic
- Publisher: Harper
- Publication date: 24 April 2012
- Publication place: United States
- Media type: Print
- Pages: 480
- ISBN: 978-0062030313 (first edition, hardcover)
- OCLC: 757483836
- Dewey Decimal: 943.71/2033092
- LC Class: DB2207.A43

Prague Winter: A Personal Story of Remembrance and War, 1937–1948 is an autobiographical book written by Madeleine Albright. The book was first published on 24 April 2012.

== Synopsis ==
This is Albright's autobiographical book. She was born in Prague, Czechoslovakia, in 1937. In this book she has narrated her childhood memories and experiences. Before she became 12 years old, she witnessed the Nazi invasion in Prague.

== Reviews ==
Los Angeles Times wrote in their review:

For American readers who may not be familiar with the legacy of Thomas and Jan Masaryk, this book provides enough sweeping history and close-up detail so that Jan's end, after the war, comes as a shock.
