= American Presence Post =

Small diplomatic office of the United States

An American presence post (APP) is a very small diplomatic facility of the United States government located abroad. It is usually staffed by a single Foreign Service officer who carries the title of consul. An American presence post is roughly equivalent to a consulate, but lacks a regular consular section, and does not issue visas. These matters are referred to the closest full-scale consulate, or the embassy which has jurisdiction over the APP. It is not uncommon to hear an APP casually referred to as a consulate or virtual consulate. Some posts that were previously operated as APP's have been upgraded to consulate status, including Busan and Medan.

== List of American presence posts ==
=== American presence posts in Africa ===
- Morocco
  - Western Sahara

=== American presence posts in Europe ===
- United Kingdom
  - Cardiff, Wales (virtual)

An American presence post was opened in Tromsø, Norway in the fall of 2023.

== See also ==
- Honorary consul
