= Madeleine Albright =

American diplomat and political scientist (1937–2022)

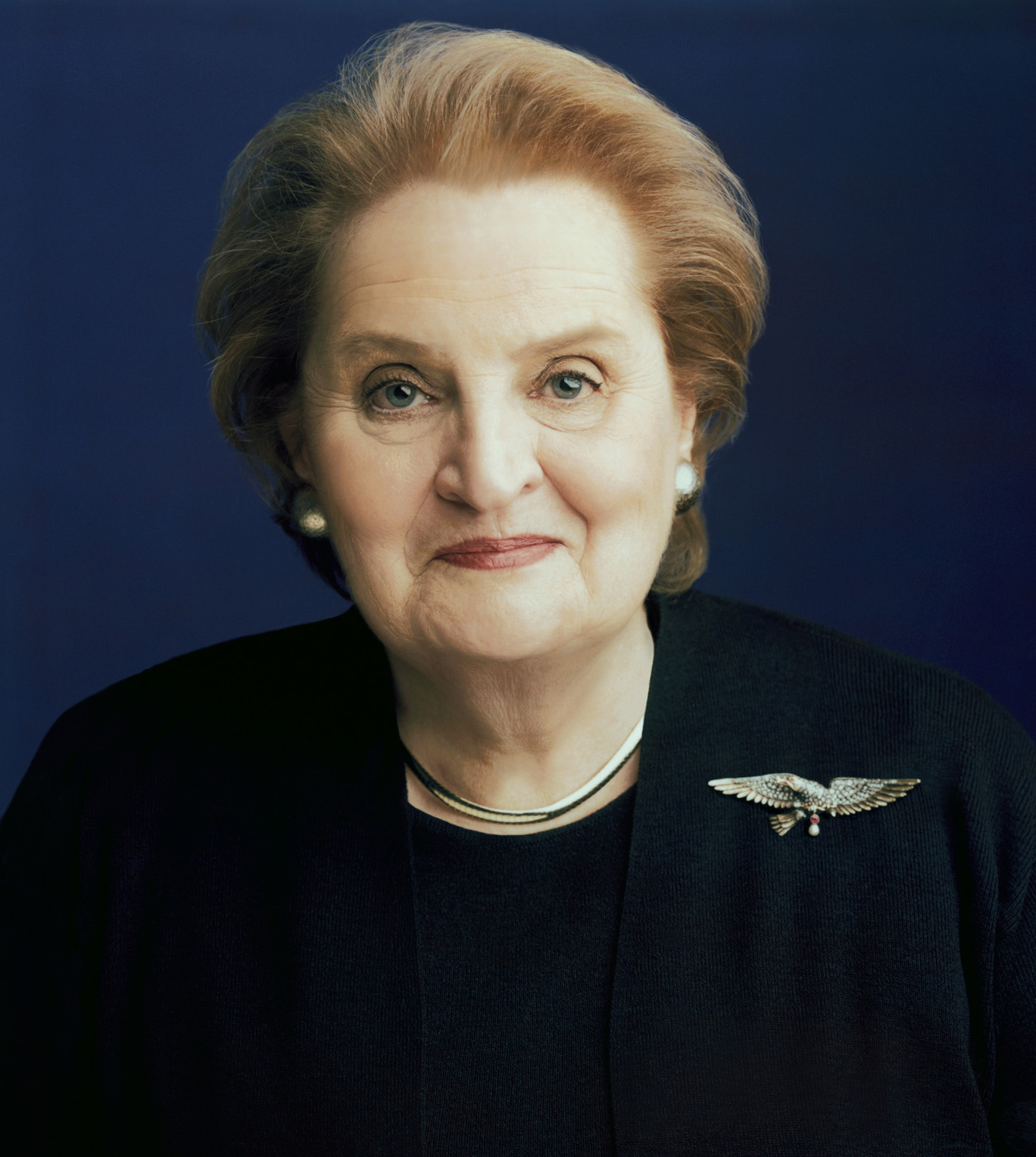
- Official portrait, 1997

64th United States Secretary of State
- In office January 23, 1997 – January 20, 2001
- President: Bill Clinton
- Deputy: Strobe Talbott
- Preceded by: Warren Christopher
- Succeeded by: Colin Powell

20th United States Ambassador to the United Nations
- In office January 27, 1993 – January 21, 1997
- President: Bill Clinton
- Preceded by: Edward J. Perkins
- Succeeded by: Bill Richardson

Personal details
- Born: Marie Jana Korbelová; May 15, 1937 Prague, Czechoslovakia
- Died: March 23, 2022 (aged 84) Washington, D.C., U.S.
- Resting place: Oak Hill Cemetery
- Citizenship: Czechoslovakia (before 1993); United States (from 1957)
- Party: Democratic
- Spouse: Joseph Albright (m. 1959; div. 1983)
- Children: 3, including Alice
- Parent: Josef Korbel (father)
- Education: Wellesley College (BA); Johns Hopkins University (attended); Columbia University (MA, PhD)
- Awards: Presidential Medal of Freedom (2012)

Madeleine Jana Korbel Albright (born Marie Jana Körbelová; May 15, 1937 – March 23, 2022) was an American diplomat and political scientist who served as the 64th United States secretary of state under President Bill Clinton from 1997 to 2001. A member of the Democratic Party, she was the first woman to hold the position.

Born in Prague, Czechoslovakia, Albright immigrated to the United States after the 1948 communist coup d'état when she was eleven years old. Her father, diplomat Josef Korbel, settled the family in Denver, Colorado, and she became a U.S. citizen in 1957. Albright graduated from Wellesley College in 1959 and earned a PhD from Columbia University in 1975, writing her thesis on the Prague Spring. She worked as an aide to Senator Edmund Muskie from 1976 to 1978, before serving as a staff member on the National Security Council under Zbigniew Brzezinski. She served in that position until 1981 when President Jimmy Carter left office.

After leaving the National Security Council, Albright joined the academic faculty of Georgetown University in 1982 and advised Democratic candidates regarding foreign policy. Following the 1992 presidential election, Albright helped assemble President Bill Clinton's National Security Council. She was appointed United States ambassador to the United Nations, a position she held until her elevation as secretary of state in 1997. Secretary Albright served in that capacity until President Clinton left office in 2001.

Albright served as chair of the Albright Stonebridge Group, a consulting firm, and was the Michael and Virginia Mortara Endowed Distinguished Professor in the Practice of Diplomacy at Georgetown University's School of Foreign Service. She was awarded the Presidential Medal of Freedom by President Barack Obama in May 2012. Albright served on the board of the Council on Foreign Relations.

== Early life and career ==
Albright was born Marie Jana Körbelová in 1937 in the Smíchov district of Prague, Czechoslovakia. Her parents were Josef Korbel, a Czech diplomat, and Anna Korbel (née Spieglová). At the time of Albright's birth, Czechoslovakia had been independent for less than 20 years, having gained independence from Austria-Hungary after World War I. Her father was a supporter of Tomáš Masaryk and Edvard Beneš. Marie Jana had a younger sister Katherine and a younger brother John (these versions of their names are Anglicized).

When Marie Jana was born, her father was serving as a press-attaché at the Czechoslovak Embassy in Belgrade. The signing of the Munich Agreement in September 1938—and the German occupation of Czechoslovakia by Adolf Hitler's troops—forced the family into exile because of their links with Beneš.

Josef and Anna converted from Judaism to Catholicism in 1941. Marie Jana and her siblings were raised in the Roman Catholic faith. In 1997, Albright said her parents never told her or her two siblings about their Jewish ancestry and heritage.

The family moved to Britain in May 1939. Here her father worked for Beneš's Czechoslovak government-in-exile. Her family first lived on Kensington Park Road in Notting Hill, London—where they lived throughout the Blitz—but later moved to Beaconsfield, then Walton-on-Thames, on the outskirts of London. They kept a large metal table in the house, which was intended to shelter the family from the recurring threat of German air raids. While in England, Marie Jana was one of the children shown in a documentary film designed to promote sympathy for war refugees in London.

After the defeat of the Nazis in the European theatre of World War II and the collapse of Nazi Germany and the Protectorate of Bohemia and Moravia, the Korbel family returned to Prague. Korbel was appointed as press attaché at the Czechoslovak Embassy in Yugoslavia, and the family moved to Belgrade—then part of Yugoslavia—which was governed by the Communist Party. Korbel was concerned his daughter would be exposed to Marxism in a Yugoslav school, and so she was taught privately by a governess before being sent to the Prealpina Institut pour Jeunes Filles finishing school in Chexbres, on Lake Geneva in Switzerland. She learned to speak French while in Switzerland and changed her name from Marie Jana to Madeleine.

The Communist Party of Czechoslovakia took over the government in 1948, with support from the Soviet Union. As an opponent of communism, Korbel was forced to resign from his position. He later obtained a position on a United Nations delegation to Kashmir. He sent his family to the United States, by way of London, to wait for him when he arrived to deliver his report to the UN Headquarters, then located in Lake Success, New York.

=== Youth and young adulthood in the United States ===
Korbel's family emigrated from the United Kingdom on the SS America, departing Southampton on November 5, 1948, and arriving at Ellis Island in New York Harbor on November 11, 1948. The family initially settled in Great Neck on the North Shore of Long Island. Korbel applied for political asylum, arguing that as an opponent of Communism, he was under threat in Prague. Korbel stated "I cannot, of course, return to the Communist Czechoslovakia as I would be arrested for my faithful adherence to the ideals of democracy. I would be most obliged to you if you could kindly convey to his Excellency the Secretary of State that I beg of him to be granted the right to stay in the United States, the same right to be given to my wife and three children."

With the help of Philip Moseley, a Russian language professor at Columbia University in New York City, Korbel obtained a position on the staff of the political science department at the University of Denver in Colorado. He became dean of the university's school of international relations, and later taught future U.S. Secretary of State Condoleezza Rice. The school was named the Josef Korbel School of International Studies in 2008 in his honor.

Madeleine Korbel spent her teen years in Denver and in 1955 graduated from the Kent Denver School in Cherry Hills Village, a suburb of Denver. She founded the school's international relations club and was its first president. She attended Wellesley College, in Wellesley, Massachusetts, on a full scholarship, majoring in political science, and graduated in 1959. The topic of her senior thesis was Zdeněk Fierlinger, a former Czechoslovak prime minister. She became a naturalized U.S. citizen in 1957, and joined the College Democrats of America.

While home in Denver from Wellesley, Korbel worked as an intern for The Denver Post. There she met Joseph Albright. He was the nephew of Alicia Patterson, owner of Newsday and wife of philanthropist Harry Frank Guggenheim. Korbel converted to the Episcopal Church at the time of her marriage. The couple were married in Wellesley in 1959, shortly after her graduation. They lived in Rolla, Missouri, while Joseph completed his military service at nearby Fort Leonard Wood. During this time, Albright worked at The Rolla Daily News.

The couple moved to Joseph's hometown of Chicago, Illinois, in January 1960. Joseph worked at the Chicago Sun-Times as a journalist, and Albright worked as a picture editor for Encyclopædia Britannica. The following year, Joseph Albright began work at Newsday in New York City, and the couple moved to Garden City on Long Island. That year, she gave birth to twin daughters, Alice Patterson Albright and Anne Korbel Albright. The twins were born six weeks premature and required a long hospital stay. As a distraction, Albright began Russian language classes at Hofstra University in the Village of Hempstead nearby.

In 1962, the family moved to Washington, D.C., where they lived in Georgetown. Albright studied international relations and continued in Russian at the Paul H. Nitze School of Advanced International Studies, a division of Johns Hopkins University in the capital.

Joseph's aunt Alicia Patterson died in 1963, and the Albrights returned to Long Island with the notion of Joseph taking over the family newspaper business. Albright gave birth to another daughter, Katharine Medill Albright, in 1967. She continued her studies at Columbia University's Department of Public Law and Government. (It was later renamed as the political science department, and is located within the School of International and Public Affairs.) She earned a certificate in Russian from the Russian Institute (now Harriman Institute), an MA and a PhD, writing her master's thesis on the Soviet diplomatic corps and her doctoral dissertation on the role of journalists in the Prague Spring of 1968. She also took a graduate course given by Zbigniew Brzezinski, who later became her boss at the U.S. National Security Council.

== Career ==
=== Early career ===
Albright returned to Washington, D.C., in 1968, and commuted to Columbia for her doctor of philosophy, which she earned in 1975. She began fund-raising for her daughters' school, involvement which led to several positions on education boards. She was eventually invited to organize a fund-raising dinner for the 1972 presidential campaign of U.S. Senator Ed Muskie of Maine. This association with Muskie led to a position as his chief legislative assistant in 1976. However, after the 1976 U.S. presidential election of Jimmy Carter, Albright's former professor Brzezinski was named National Security Advisor, and recruited Albright from Muskie in 1978 to work in the West Wing as the National Security Council's congressional liaison. Following Carter's loss in 1980 to Ronald Reagan, Albright moved on to the Woodrow Wilson International Center for Scholars at the Smithsonian Institution in Washington, D.C., where she was given a grant for a research project. She chose to write on the dissident journalists involved in Poland's Solidarity movement, then in its infancy but gaining international attention. She traveled to Poland for her research, interviewing dissidents in Gdańsk, Warsaw, and Kraków. Upon her return to Washington, her husband announced his intention to divorce her so that he could pursue a relationship with another woman; the divorce was finalized in 1983.

Albright joined the academic staff at Georgetown University in Washington, D.C., in 1982, specializing in Eastern European studies. She also directed the university's program on women in global politics. She served as a major Democratic Party foreign policy advisor, briefing vice-presidential candidate Geraldine Ferraro in 1984 and presidential candidate Michael Dukakis in 1988 (both campaigns ended in defeat). In 1992, Bill Clinton returned the White House to the Democratic Party, and Albright was employed to handle the transition to a new administration at the National Security Council. In January 1993, Clinton nominated her to be U.S. ambassador to the United Nations, her first diplomatic posting.

=== U.S. Ambassador to the United Nations ===
Albright was appointed ambassador to the United Nations, a Cabinet-level position, shortly after Clinton was inaugurated, presenting her credentials on February 9, 1993. During her tenure at the U.N., she led the opposition to U.N. secretary-general, Boutros Boutros-Ghali, whom she criticized as "disengaged" and "neglect[ful]" of genocide in Rwanda. The relationship between Albright and Boutros Boutros-Ghali was marked by deep tension, political maneuvering, and ultimately, a dramatic and public clash that led to Boutros-Ghali's ouster as UN Secretary-General. Albright was the chief architect of the U.S. campaign to block Boutros-Ghali's bid for a second term, despite his overwhelming base of support. She was successful in blocking him. Albright wrote: "My deepest regret from my years in public service is the failure of the United States and the international community to act sooner to halt these crimes."

In Shake Hands with the Devil, Roméo Dallaire writes that in 1994, in Albright's role as the U.S. Permanent Representative to the U.N., she avoided describing the killings in Rwanda as "genocide" until overwhelmed by the evidence for it; this is now how she described these massacres in her memoirs. She was instructed to support a reduction or withdrawal (something which never happened) of the U.N. Assistance Mission for Rwanda but was later given more flexibility. Albright later remarked in PBS documentary Ghosts of Rwanda that "it was a very, very difficult time, and the situation was unclear. You know, in retrospect, it all looks very clear. But when you were [there] at the time, it was unclear about what was happening in Rwanda."

Also in 1996, after Cuban military pilots shot down two small civilian aircraft flown by the Cuban-American exile group Brothers to the Rescue over international waters, she announced at a UN Security Council meeting debating a resolution condemning Cuba: "Frankly, this is not cojones. This is cowardice." The line endeared her to President Clinton, who said it was "probably the most effective one-liner in the whole administration's foreign policy". When Albright appeared at a memorial service for the deceased in Miami on March 2, 1996, she was greeted with chants of "libertad".

In 1996, Albright entered into a secret pact with Richard Clarke, Michael Sheehan, and James Rubin to overthrow U.N. secretary-general Boutros Boutros-Ghali, who was running unopposed for a second term in the 1996 selection. After 15 U.S. peacekeepers died in a failed raid in Somalia in 1993, Boutros-Ghali became a political scapegoat in the United States. They dubbed the pact "Operation Orient Express" to reflect their hope that other nations would join the United States. Although every other member of the United Nations Security Council voted for Boutros-Ghali, the United States refused to yield to international pressure to drop its lone veto. After four deadlocked meetings of the Security Council, Boutros-Ghali suspended his candidacy and became the only U.N. secretary-general ever to be denied a second term. The United States then fought a four-round veto duel with France, forcing it to back down and accept Kofi Annan as the next secretary-general. In his memoirs, Clarke said that "the entire operation had strengthened Albright's hand in the competition to be Secretary of State in the second Clinton administration".

=== Secretary of State ===
When Clinton began his second term in January 1997, following his re-election, he required a new Secretary of State, as incumbent Warren Christopher was retiring. The top level of the Clinton administration was divided into two camps on selecting the new foreign policy. Outgoing Chief of Staff Leon Panetta favored Albright, but a separate faction went for different candidates such as Senator Sam Nunn of Georgia, Senator George J. Mitchell of Maine, and former Assistant Secretary of State Richard Holbrooke. Albright orchestrated a campaign on her own behalf that proved successful. When Albright took office as the 64th U.S. Secretary of State on January 23, 1997, she became the first female U.S. Secretary of State and the highest-ranking woman in the history of the U.S. government at the time of her appointment. Not being a natural-born citizen of the U.S., she was not eligible as a U.S. presidential successor.

During her tenure, Albright considerably influenced American foreign policy in Bosnia and Herzegovina and the Middle East. Following the Dayton Agreement, in which a cease-fire in the Bosnian War was reached, President Clinton committed to sending American troops to Bosnia to enforce the agreement, as strongly recommended by Albright. According to Albright's memoirs, she once argued with Colin Powell for the use of military force by asking, "What's the point of you saving this superb military for, Colin, if we can't use it?" Albright strongly advocated for U.S. economic sanctions against Saddam Hussein's Iraq.

As Secretary of State, she represented the U.S. at the transfer of sovereignty over Hong Kong on July 1, 1997. She along with the British contingents boycotted the swearing-in ceremony of the Chinese-appointed Hong Kong Legislative Council, which replaced the elected one. In October 1997, she voiced her approval for national security exemptions to the Kyoto Protocol, arguing that NATO operations should not be limited by controls on greenhouse gas emissions, and hoped that other NATO members would also support the exemptions at the Third Conference of the Parties in Kyoto, Japan.

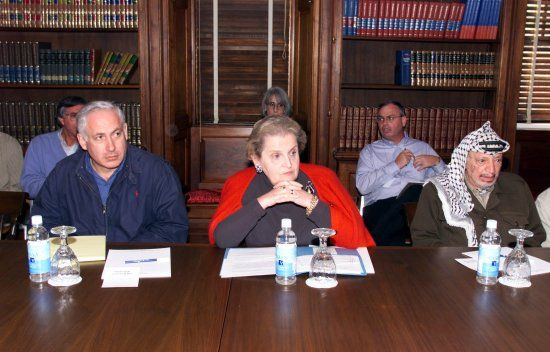
Albright with Benjamin Netanyahu (left) and Yasser Arafat at the Wye River Memorandum, 1998

According to several accounts, Prudence Bushnell, U.S. ambassador to Kenya, repeatedly asked Washington for additional security at the embassy in Nairobi, including in a letter directly addressed to Albright in April 1998. Bushnell was ignored. She later stated that when she spoke to Albright about the letter, Albright told her that it had not been shown to her. In Against All Enemies, Richard Clarke writes about an exchange with Albright several months after the U.S. embassies in Kenya and Tanzania were bombed in August 1998. "What do you think will happen if you lose another embassy?" Clarke asked. "The Republicans in Congress will go after you." "First of all, I didn't lose these two embassies", Albright shot back. "I inherited them in the shape they were."

In 1998, at the NATO summit, Albright articulated what became known as the "three Ds" of NATO, "which is no diminution of NATO, no discrimination and no duplication—because I think that we don't need any of those three "Ds" to happen".

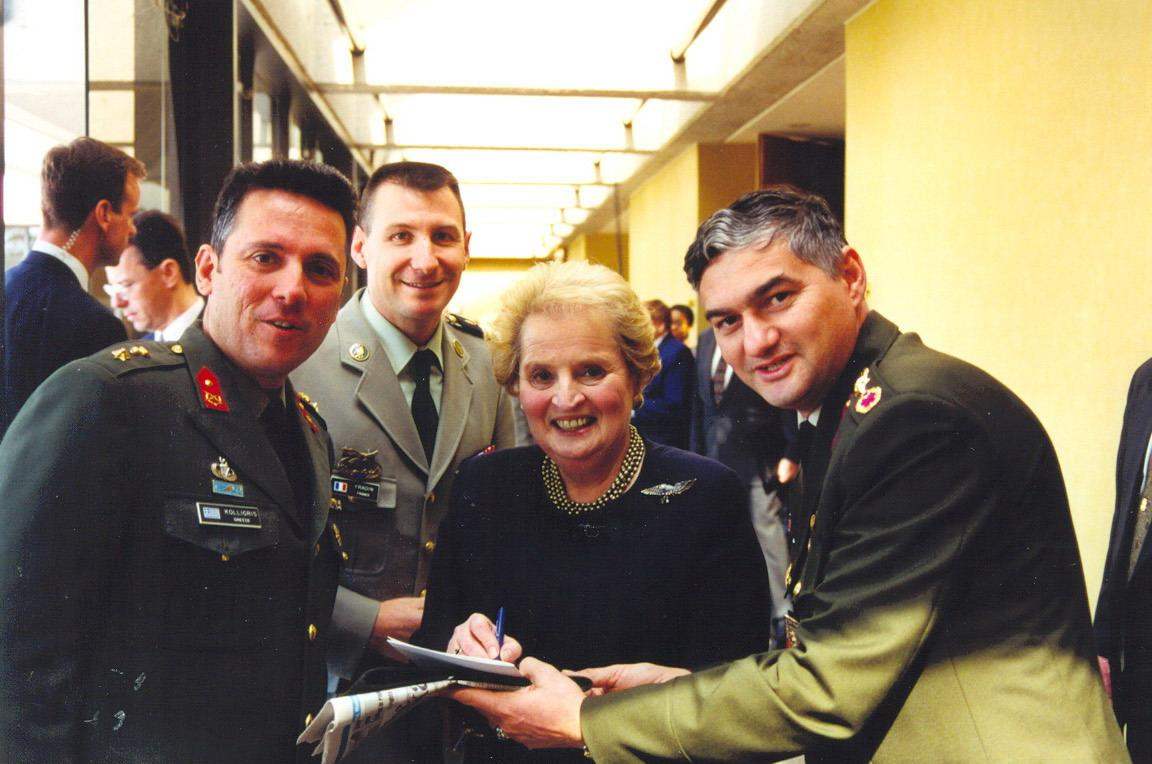
With NATO officers during NATO Ceremony of Accession of New Members, 1999

In February 1998, Albright took part in a town-hall style meeting at St. John Arena in Columbus where she, William Cohen, and Sandy Berger attempted to make the case for military action in Iraq. The crowd was disruptive, repeatedly drowning out the discussion with boos and anti-war chants. James Rubin downplayed the disruptions, claiming the crowd was supportive of a war policy. Later that year, both Bill Clinton and Albright insisted that an attack on Saddam Hussein could be stopped only if Hussein reversed his decision to halt arms inspections.

In an interview on The Today Show, February 19, 1998, Albright said "If we have to use force, it is because we are America; we are the indispensable nation. We stand tall and we see further than other countries into the future...."

Albright was a leading proponent of the NATO bombing of Yugoslavia as a means to ending the Kosovo War, leading to popular media to describe it as "Madeleine's War".

Albright became one of the highest level Western diplomats ever to meet Kim Jong-il, the then-leader of communist North Korea, during an official state visit to that country in 2000.

On January 8, 2001, in one of her last acts as Secretary of State, Albright made a farewell call to Kofi Annan and said that the U.S. would continue to press Iraq to destroy all its weapons of mass destruction as a condition of lifting economic sanctions, even after the end of the Clinton administration on January 20, 2001.

Albright received the U.S. Senator H. John Heinz III Award for Greatest Public Service by an Elected or Appointed Official, an award given out annually by the Jefferson Awards Foundation, in 2001.

=== Post-Clinton administration ===
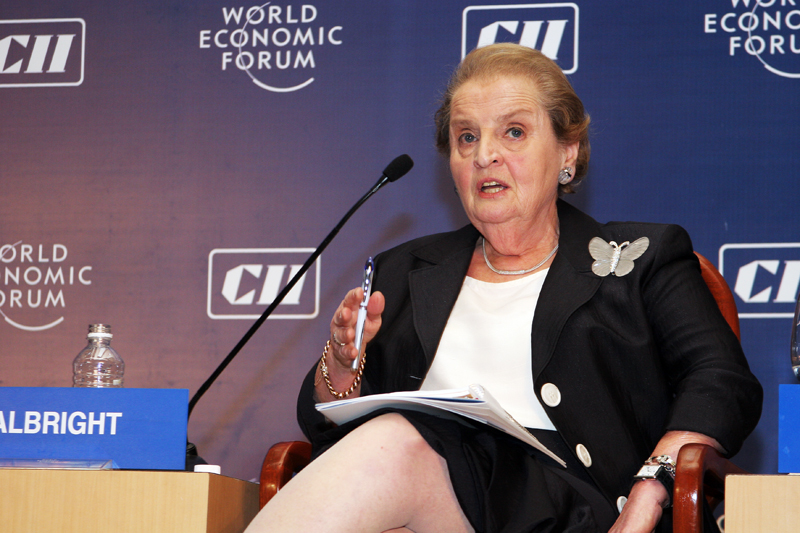
Madeleine Albright at the World Economic Forum

Following Albright's term as Secretary of State, Czech president Václav Havel spoke openly about the possibility of Albright succeeding him. Albright was reportedly flattered, but denied ever seriously considering the possibility of running for office in her country of origin.

Albright was elected a Fellow of the American Academy of Arts and Sciences in 2001. Also that year, Albright founded the Albright Group, an international strategy consulting firm based in Washington, D.C., that later become the Albright Stonebridge Group. Affiliated with the firm is Albright Capital Management, which was founded in 2005 to engage in private fund management related to emerging markets.

Albright accepted a position on the board of directors of the New York Stock Exchange (NYSE) in 2003. In 2005, she declined to run for re-election to the board in the aftermath of the Richard Grasso compensation scandal, in which Grasso, the chairman of the NYSE board of directors, had been granted $187.5 million in compensation, with little governance by the board on which Albright sat. During the tenure of the interim chairman, John S. Reed, Albright served as chairwoman of the NYSE board's nominating and governance committee. Shortly after the appointment of the NYSE board's permanent chairman in 2005, Albright submitted her resignation. According to PolitiFact, Albright opposed the 2003 invasion of Iraq, although after the U.S. was committed to the war, she said she would support the President.

Albright served on the board of directors for the Council on Foreign Relations and on the International Advisory Committee of the Brookings Doha Center. As of 2016, she was the Mortara Distinguished Professor of Diplomacy at the Georgetown University School of Foreign Service in Washington, D.C. Albright served as chairperson of the National Democratic Institute for International Affairs and as president of the Truman Scholarship Foundation. She was also the co-chair of the Commission on Legal Empowerment of the Poor and was the chairwoman of the Council of Women World Leaders Women's Ministerial Initiative up until November 16, 2007, when she was succeeded by Margot Wallström.

Albright guest starred on the television drama Gilmore Girls as herself on October 25, 2005. She also made a guest appearance on Parks and Recreation, in the eighth episode of the seventh season. Albright also appeared in two episodes of the CBS series Madam Secretary to offer advice to the fictional Secretary of State. In a later episode, she was joined by former Secretaries of State, Colin Powell and Hillary Clinton.

At the National Press Club in Washington, D.C., on November 13, 2007, Albright declared that she and William Cohen would co-chair a new Genocide Prevention Task Force created by the United States Holocaust Memorial Museum, the American Academy of Diplomacy, and the United States Institute of Peace. Their appointment was criticized by Harut Sassounian and the Armenian National Committee of America, as both Albright and Cohen had spoken against a Congressional resolution on the Armenian genocide.

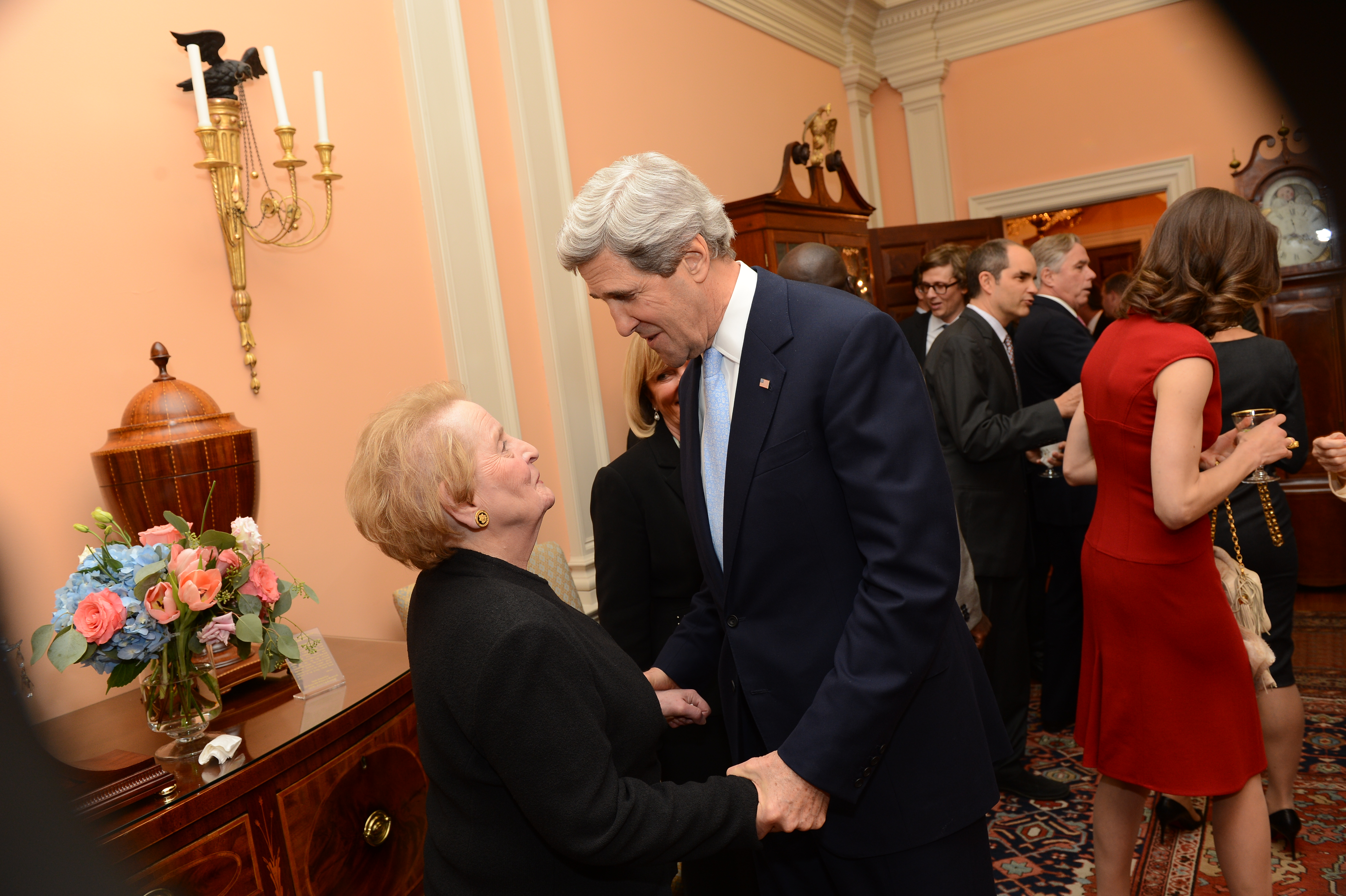
U.S. Secretary of State John Kerry greets Albright, February 6, 2013

Albright endorsed and supported Hillary Clinton in her 2008 presidential campaign. Albright was a close friend of Clinton and served as an informal advisor on foreign policy matters. On December 1, 2008, President-elect Barack Obama nominated then-Senator Clinton for Albright's former post of Secretary of State.

During this period, she also served as a business consultant and brand ambassador for Herbalife, a global multi-level marketing (MLM) corporation that develops and sells dietary supplements. The company is alleged to be a fraudulent pyramid scheme.

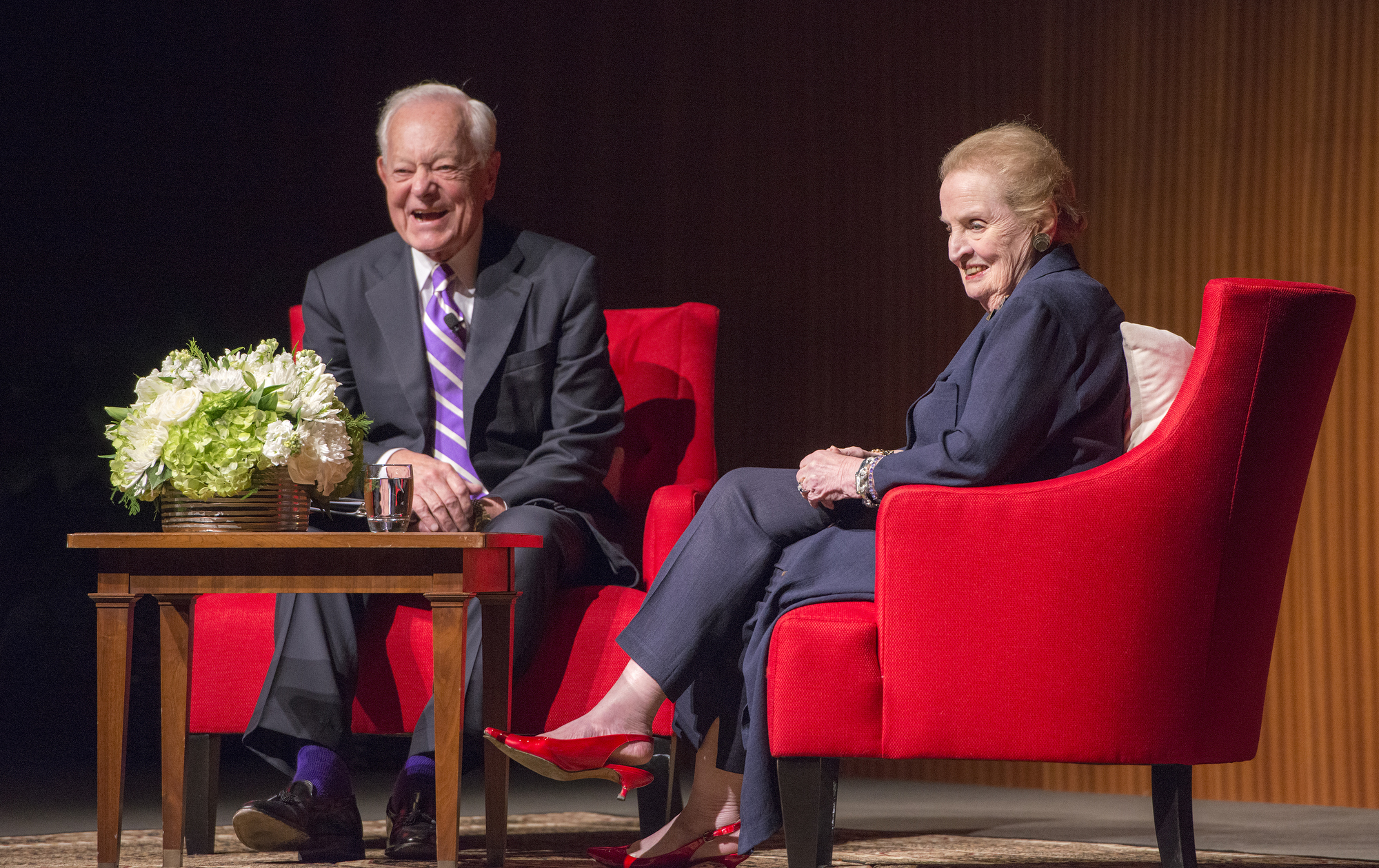
Bob Schieffer and Madeleine Albright at the LBJ Presidential Library in 2017

In September 2009, Albright opened an exhibition of her personal jewelry collection at the Museum of Art and Design in New York City, which ran until January 2010. In 2009, Albright also published the book Read My Pins: Stories from a Diplomat's Jewel Box about her pins. Read My Pins: The Madeleine Albright Collection was shown at the Legion of Honor, Fine Arts Museum of San Francisco from November 19, 2016 – January 29, 2017.

In August 2012, when speaking at an Obama campaign event in Highlands Ranch, Colorado, Albright was asked the question "How long will you blame that previous administration for all of your problems?", to which she replied "Forever". In October 2012, Albright appeared in a video on the official Twitter feed for the Democratic Party, responding to then-GOP candidate Mitt Romney's assertion that Russia was the "number-one geopolitical foe" of the United States. According to Albright, Romney's statement was proof that he had "little understanding of what was actually going on in the 21st Century [and] he is not up to date and that is a very dangerous aspect [of his candidacy]".

Albright described Donald Trump as "the most un-American, anti-democratic leader" in U.S. history. She also criticized the Trump administration for its delay in filling some diplomatic posts as a sign of "disdain for diplomacy".

After 2016, Albright served as chair of Albright Stonebridge Group, a consulting firm, and chair of the advisory council for The Hague Institute for Global Justice, which was founded in 2011 in The Hague. She also served as an Honorary Chair for the World Justice Project (WJP). The WJP works to lead a global, multidisciplinary effort to strengthen the rule of law for the development of communities of opportunity and equity.

=== Investments ===
Albright was a co-investor with Jacob Rothschild, 4th Baron Rothschild, and George Soros in a $350 million investment vehicle called Helios Towers Africa, which intends to buy or build thousands of mobile phone towers in Africa.

== Controversies ==
=== Sanctions against Iraq ===
During the 1990s and 2000s, many surveys and studies concluded that excess deaths in Iraq—specifically among children under the age of five—greatly increased after the implementation of sanctions against Iraq following the Iraqi invasion of Kuwait in August 1990. Later surveys conducted during the U.S.-led occupation of Iraq (2003–2011) "all put the U5MR in Iraq during 1995–2000 in the vicinity of 40 per 1000," suggesting that "there was no major rise in child mortality in Iraq after 1990 and during the period of the sanctions."

On May 12, 1996, then-ambassador Albright defended the sanctions on a 60 Minutes segment in which Lesley Stahl asked her, "We have heard that half a million children have died. I mean, that's more children than died in Hiroshima. And, you know, is the price worth it?" and Albright replied, "We think the price is worth it." The segment won an Emmy Award. Albright later criticized Stahl's segment as "amount[ing] to Iraqi propaganda", saying that her question was a loaded question. She wrote, "I had fallen into a trap and said something I did not mean", and that she regretted coming "across as cold-blooded and cruel". She apologized for her remarks in a 2004 interview with Democracy Now!, and a 2020 interview with The New York Times, calling them "totally stupid". Albright addressed the controversy in her 2020 memoir, acknowledging that her answer was "a mistake" and "that UN sanctions contributed to hardships in Iraq," but also noting that "the producers of 60 Minutes were duped. Subsequent research has shown that Iraqi propagandists deceived international observers," citing a 2017 article in The BMJ.

=== Art ownership lawsuit ===
External videos
- Presentation by Michael Dobbs on Madeleine Albright: A Twentieth-Century Odyssey, May 14, 1999, C-SPAN

Following The Washington Post's profile of Albright by Michael Dobbs, an Austrian man named Philipp Harmer launched legal action against Albright, claiming her father had illegally taken possession of artwork that belonged to his great-grandfather, Karl Nebrich. Nebrich, a German-speaking Prague industrialist, abandoned some of the possessions in his apartment when ethnic Germans were expelled from the country after World War II under the Beneš decrees. His apartment, at 11 Hradčanská Street in Prague, was subsequently given to Korbel and his family. Harmer alleged that Korbel stole his great-grandfather's artwork. Counsel for Albright's family stated that Harmer's claim was unfounded.

=== Speech against Serbs and war profiteering ===
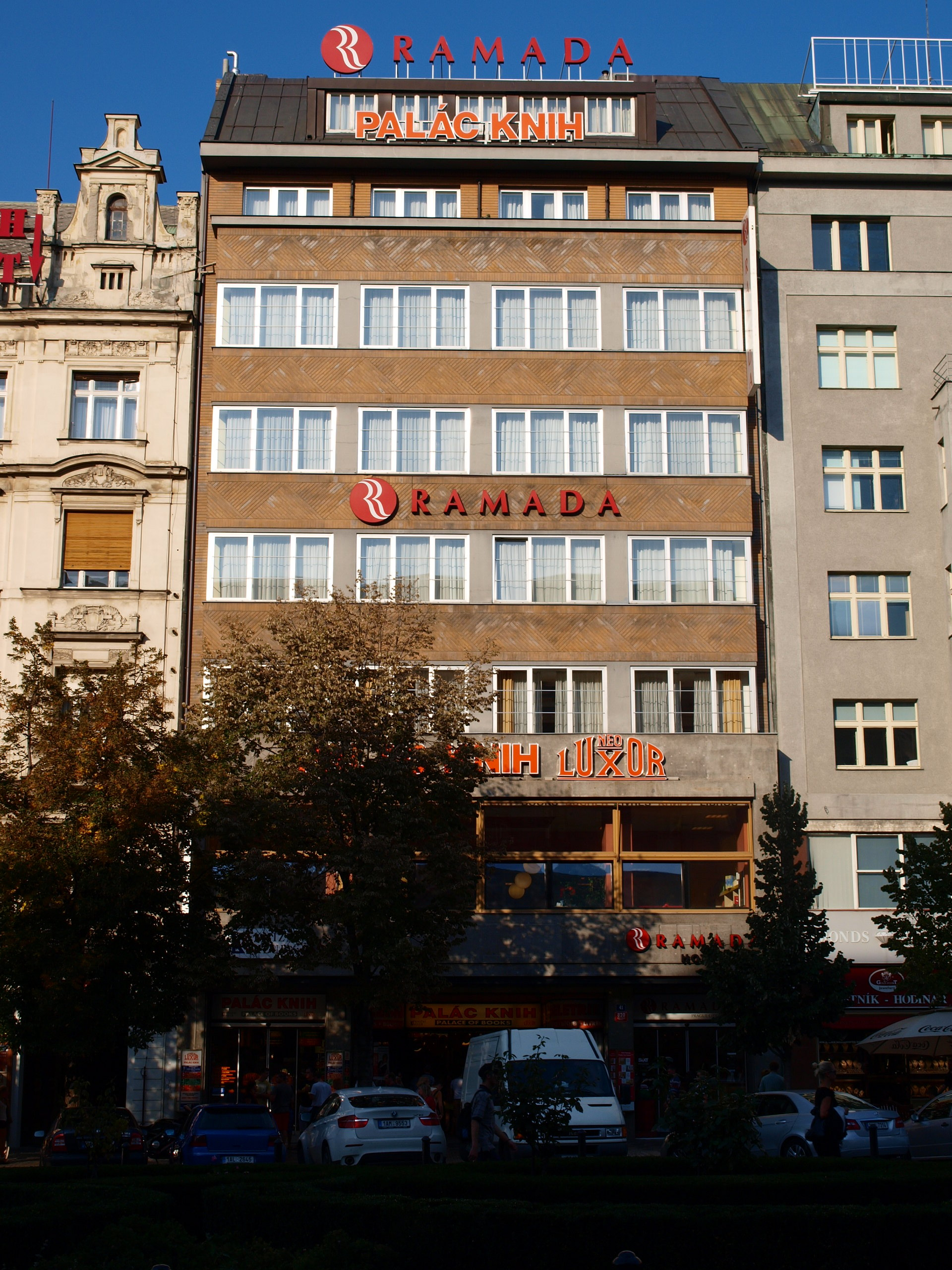
Location of the Prague incident

In late October 2012, during a book signing in the Prague bookstore Palác Knih Luxor, Albright was visited by a group of activists from the Czech organization Přátelé Srbů na Kosovu (Friends of Serbs in Kosovo). She was filmed saying, "Disgusting Serbs, get out!" to the Czech group, which had brought war photos to the signing, some of which showed Serbian victims of the NATO bombing campaign in Serbia in 1999. The protesters were expelled from the event when police arrived. Two videos of the incident were later posted by the group on their YouTube channel. Filmmaker Emir Kusturica expressed thanks to Czech director Václav Dvořák for organizing and participating in the demonstration. Together with other protesters, Dvořák also reported Albright to the police, stating that she was spreading ethnic hatred and disrespect to the victims of the war.

Albright's involvement in the bombing of Serbia was the main cause of the demonstration—a sensitive topic which became even more controversial when it was revealed that in 2012 her investment firm, Albright Capital Management, was preparing to bid in the proposed privatization of Kosovo's state-owned telecom and postal company, Post and Telecom of Kosovo. In an article published by the New York City-based magazine Bloomberg Businessweek, it was estimated that the deal could be as large as €600 million. Serbia opposed the sale, and intended to file a lawsuit to block it, alleging that the rights of former Serbian employees were not respected. The bid never happened and was withdrawn by her investment fund.

=== Hillary Clinton campaign comment ===
Albright supported Hillary Clinton during her 2016 presidential campaign. While introducing Clinton at a campaign event in New Hampshire ahead of that state's primary, Albright said, "There's a special place in hell for women who don't help each other" (a phrase Albright had used on several previous occasions in other contexts). The remark was seen as a rebuke of younger women who supported Clinton's primary rival, Senator Bernie Sanders, which many women found "startling and offensive". In a New York Times op-ed published several days after the remark, Albright said: "I absolutely believe what I said, that women should help one another, but this was the wrong context and the wrong time to use that line. I did not mean to argue that women should support a particular candidate based solely on gender."

== Honorary degrees and awards ==
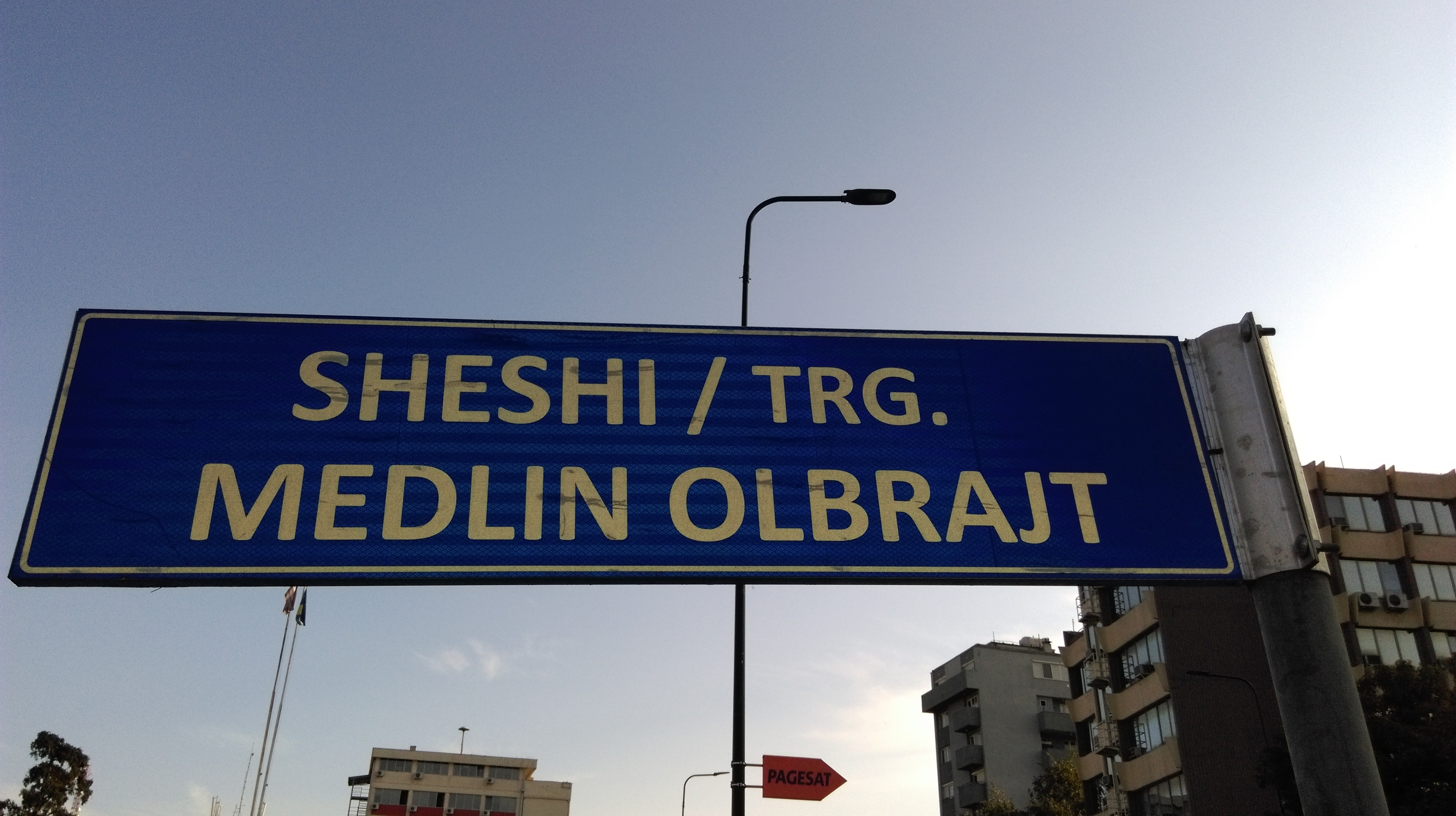
Medlin Olbrajt Square in Pristina, Kosovo named in honor of Madeleine Albright

Albright held honorary degrees from Brandeis University (1996), Mount Holyoke College (1997), the University of Washington (2002), Smith College (2003), Washington University in St. Louis (2003), University of Winnipeg (2005), the University of North Carolina at Chapel Hill (2007), Knox College (2008), Bowdoin College (2013), Dickinson College (2014), and Tufts University (2015).

In 1998, Albright was inducted into the National Women's Hall of Fame. Albright was the second recipient of the Hanno R. Ellenbogen Citizenship Award presented by the Prague Society for International Cooperation. In March 2000 Albright received an Honorary Silver Medal of Jan Masaryk at a ceremony in Prague sponsored by the Bohemian Foundation and the Czech Ministry of Foreign Affairs. In 2006, she was named by Carnegie Corporation to the inaugural class of winners of the Great Immigrants Award. In 2010, she was inducted into the Colorado Women's Hall of Fame.

In 2019, Time created 89 new covers to celebrate women of the year starting from 1920; it chose Albright for 1999. In 2020, Albright was named by Time among the world's 100 powerful women who defined the last century.

Albright was selected for the inaugural 2021 Forbes 50 Over 50; made up of entrepreneurs, leaders, scientists, and creators who are over the age of 50.

== Personal life ==
Albright married Joseph Albright in 1959. The couple had three daughters before divorcing in 1982. She had been raised Catholic, but converted to the Episcopal Church upon her marriage in 1959. Albright was a devout Episcopalian, regularly attending services at St. John's Episcopal Church in Washington D.C.

Her parents had converted from Judaism to Catholicism in 1941, during her early childhood, after fleeing Czechoslovakia for England in 1939, to avoid anti-Jewish persecution before they immigrated to the U.S. They never discussed their Jewish ancestry with her later. When The Washington Post reported on Albright's Jewish ancestry shortly after she had become Secretary of State in 1997, Albright said that the report was a "major surprise". Albright said that she did not learn until age 59 that both her parents were born and raised in Jewish families. As many as a dozen of her relatives in Czechoslovakia—including three of her grandparents—had been murdered in the Holocaust.

In addition to English, Russian, and Czech, Albright spoke French, German, Polish, and Serbo-Croatian. She also understood spoken Slovak.

Albright mentioned her physical fitness and exercise regimen in several interviews. In 2006, she said she was capable of leg pressing 400 pounds (180 kg). Albright was listed as one of the 50 best-dressed over 50s by The Guardian in March 2013.

=== Death and funeral ===
Albright died from cancer in Washington, D.C., on March 23, 2022, at the age of 84. Many political figures paid tribute to her, including U.S. presidents Jimmy Carter, Bill Clinton, George W. Bush, Barack Obama and Joe Biden, and former British prime minister Tony Blair.

Her funeral, held at Washington National Cathedral on April 27, was attended by President Joe Biden, former presidents Barack Obama and Bill Clinton, former vice president Al Gore, and former secretaries of state Hillary Clinton and Condoleezza Rice, as well as presidents Salome Zourabichvili of Georgia and Vjosa Osmani of Kosovo. She was interred in Oak Hill Cemetery in Georgetown, Washington, DC.

In Serbia and Republika Srpska, her death prompted the circulation of satirical obituaries and online memes; scholars have described this as an example of memetic warfare used to reactivate collective memory of the 1999 NATO bombing.

== Bibliography ==
- Madam Secretary: A Memoir. Miramax. 2003. ISBN 1-4013-5962-0.
- The Mighty and the Almighty: Reflections on America, God, and World Affairs. Harper. 2006. ISBN 978-0-06-089257-9.
- Memo to the President Elect: How We Can Restore America's Reputation and Leadership. Harper Collins. 2008. ISBN 978-0-06-135181-5.
- Read My Pins: Stories from a Diplomat's Jewel Box. Harper Collins. 2009. ISBN 978-0-06-089918-9.
- Prague Winter: A Personal Story of Remembrance and War, 1937–1948. Harper. 2012. ISBN 978-0-06-203031-3.
- Fascism: A Warning. Harper Collins. 2018. ISBN 978-0-06-280218-7.
- Hell and Other Destinations: A 21st-Century Memoir. Harper. 2020. ISBN 978-0-06-280225-5.

== See also ==
- List of international trips made by Madeleine Albright as United States Secretary of State
- Foreign policy of the Bill Clinton administration
- List of female ambassadors of the United States
- List of female United States Cabinet members
- List of foreign-born United States Cabinet members
- List of people who have held multiple United States Cabinet-level positions

Diplomatic posts
Preceded by Edward Perkins	United States Ambassador to the United Nations; 1993–1997	Succeeded by Bill Richardson
Political offices
Preceded by Warren Christopher	United States Secretary of State; 1997–2001	Succeeded by Colin Powell
