= John Lewis Gaddis =

American historian and academic (born 1941)

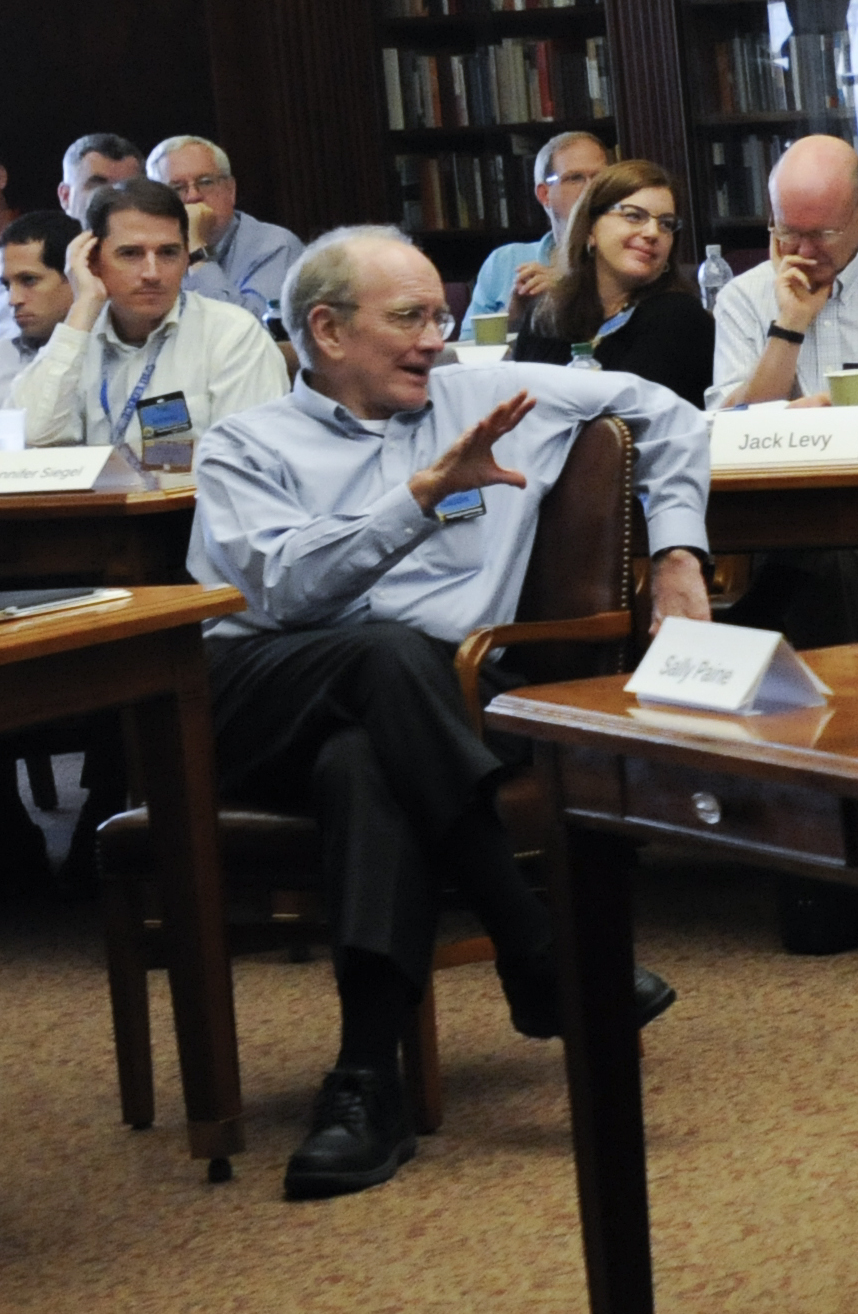
- Gaddis speaking to U.S. Naval War College (NWC) faculty during the Teaching Grand Strategy workshop in 2012
- Born: April 2, 1941 (age 85); Cotulla, Texas, U.S.
- Occupations: Cold War historian, political scientist, writer

Education
- Education: University of Texas, Austin (BA, MA, PhD)
- Doctoral advisor: Robert A. Divine

Philosophical work
- Era: Contemporary philosophy
- Region: Western philosophy
- School: Neorealism
- Institutions: Ohio University; Yale University; Naval War College; University of Oxford; Princeton University
- Main interests: Foreign relations of the United States

John Lewis Gaddis (born April 2, 1941) is an American Cold War historian, political scientist, and writer. He is the Robert A. Lovett Professor of Military and Naval History at Yale University. He is best known for his work on the Cold War and grand strategy, and he has been hailed as the "Dean of Cold War Historians" by The New York Times. Gaddis is also the official biographer of the prominent 20th-century American diplomat and historian George F. Kennan. George F. Kennan: An American Life (2011), his biography of Kennan, won the 2012 Pulitzer Prize for Biography or Autobiography.

== Biography ==
Gaddis attended the University of Texas at Austin, receiving his B.A. in 1963, M.A. in 1965, and Ph.D. in 1968, the latter under the direction of Robert Divine. Gaddis then taught briefly at Indiana University Southeast, before joining Ohio University in 1969. At Ohio, he founded and directed the Contemporary History Institute, and was named a distinguished professor in 1983.

In the 1975–1977 academic years, Gaddis was a visiting professor of Strategy at the Naval War College. In the 1992–1993 academic year, he was the Harmsworth Visiting professor of American History at Oxford. He has also held visiting positions at Princeton University and the University of Helsinki. He served as president of the Society for Historians of American Foreign Relations in 1992.

In 1997, he moved to Yale University to become the Lovett Professor of Military and Naval History. In the 2000–2001 academic year, Gaddis was the George Eastman Professor at Oxford, the second scholar (after Robin Winks) to have the honor of being both Eastman and Harmsworth professor. He sits on the advisory committee of the Wilson Center's Cold War International History Project, which he helped establish in 1991. Gaddis is also known for his close relationship with the late George Kennan and his wife, whom Gaddis described as "my companions".

== Scholarship ==
Gaddis is a well-known historian for his writing about the Cold War. Perhaps his most famous work is Strategies of Containment (1982; rev. 2005), which analyzes the theory and practice of containment that was employed against the Soviet Union by Cold War American presidents. His 1983 distillation of post-revisionist scholarship also guided Cold War research.

We Now Know (1997) presented an analysis of the Cold War through the Cuban Missile Crisis that incorporated new archival evidence from the Soviet bloc. It is one of the first attempts to write the Cold War's history after it ended.

The Cold War (2005) is an examination of the history and effects of the Cold War in a more removed context, and won Gaddis the 2006 Harry S. Truman Book Prize. Critics were less impressed, with Tony Judt summarising the book as "a history of America's cold war: as seen from America, as experienced in America, and told in a way most agreeable to many American readers," and David S. Painter writing that it was a "carefully crafted defense of US policy and policymakers" that was "not comprehensive."

Gaddis's 2011 biography of George Kennan garnered multiple prizes, including a Pulitzer.

John Nagl described Gaddis's 2018 book On Grand Strategy as "a book that should be read by every American leader or would-be leader".

Gaddis is known for arguing that Soviet leader Joseph Stalin's personality and role in history constituted one of the most important causes of the Cold War. Within the field of US diplomatic history, he was originally most associated with the concept of post-revisionism, the idea of moving past the revisionist and orthodox interpretations of the origins of the Cold War to embrace what were (in the 1970s) interpretations based upon the then-growing availability of government documents from the United States, Great Britain and other western government archives. Due to his growing focus on Stalin and leanings toward US nationalism, Gaddis is now widely seen as more orthodox than post-revisionist. Revisionist historian Bruce Cumings had a debate with Gaddis in the 1990s, in which Cumings criticized Gaddis as moralistic and lacking in objectivity.

== Political views ==
During the US invasion of Iraq, Gaddis argued: "The world now must be made safe for democracy, and this is no longer just an idealistic issue; it's an issue of our own safety." During the United States occupation of Iraq, Gaddis asserted that Bush had established America "as a more powerful and purposeful actor within the international system than it had been on September 11, 2001." Historian James Chace argues that Gaddis supports an "informal imperial policy abroad." Gaddis believes that preventive war is a constructive part of American tradition, and that there is no meaningful difference between preventive and pre-emptive war.

About the first Trump presidency he said, "We may have been overdue for some reconsideration of the whole political system. There are times when the vision is not going to come from within the system and the vision is going to come from outside the system. And maybe this is one of those times."

== Personal life ==
Gaddis was born in Cotulla, Texas, the son of Harry Passmore Gaddis and his wife Isabel Florence (Maltsberger) Gaddis. He is close to President George W. Bush, making suggestions to his speech writers, and has been described as an "overt admirer" of the 43rd President. After leaving office, Bush took up painting as a hobby at Gaddis's recommendation. Gaddis is a fellow of the American Academy of Arts and Sciences.

== Awards and distinctions ==
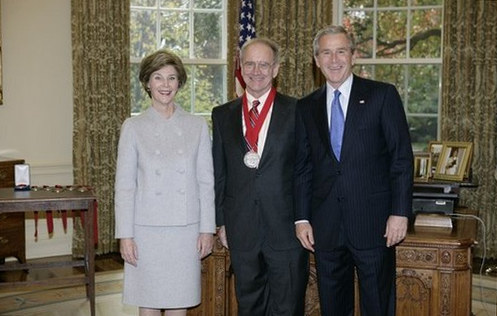
US President George W. Bush and First Lady Laura Bush standing with 2005 National Humanities Medal recipient John Lewis Gaddis on November 10, 2005, in the Oval Office at the White House

- 2012 – Pulitzer Prize for Biography or Autobiography
- 2012 – American History Book Prize
- 2011 – National Book Critics Circle Award, Biography
- 2006 – Harry S. Truman Book Award
- 2005 – National Humanities Medal
- 2003 – Yale Phi Beta Kappa DeVane Medalist for undergraduate teaching
- 1996 – Fulbright Scholar to Poland
- 1995 – Wilson Center Fellowship
- 1986 – Guggenheim Fellowship
- 1980 – Fulbright Scholar to Finland
- 1973 – Bancroft Prize
- 1973 – National Historical Society Prize

== Selected publications ==
=== Books ===
External videos
- Q&A interview with Gaddis on On Grand Strategy, May 27, 2018, C-SPAN
- After Words interview with Gaddis on George F. Kennan: An American Life, March 3, 2012, C-SPAN
- Interview with Gaddis on George F. Kennan, September 22, 2012, C-SPAN
- Presentation by Gaddis on George F. Kennan, September 22, 2012, C-SPAN
- Presentation by Gaddis on The Cold War: A New History, February 1, 2006, C-SPAN
- Booknotes interview with Gaddis on Surprise, Security, and the American Experience, May 16, 2004, C-SPAN
- Presentation by Gaddis on We Now Know: Rethinking Cold War History, April 3, 1997, C-SPAN

- On Grand Strategy. New York, New York: The Penguin Press. 2018. ISBN 978-1-594-20351-0.
- George F. Kennan: An American Life. New York, NY: The Penguin Press. 2011. ISBN 978-1-594-20312-1.
- The Cold War: A New History. New York, NY: The Penguin Press. 2005. ISBN 978-1-594-20062-5. US edition
  The Cold War. London: Allen Lane. 2005. ISBN 978-0-713-99912-9. UK edition
- Surprise, Security, and the American Experience. Cambridge, MA: Harvard University Press. 2004. ISBN 978-0-674-01174-8.
- The Landscape of History: How Historians Map the Past. New York, NY: Oxford University Press. 2002. ISBN 978-0-195-06652-4.
- (Co-editor with Philip H. Gordon, Ernest R. May and Jonathan Rosenberg). Cold War Statesmen Confront the Bomb: Nuclear Diplomacy Since 1945. Oxford: Oxford University Press. 1999. ISBN 978-0-198-29468-9.
- We Now Know: Rethinking Cold War History. Oxford: Clarendon Press. 1997. ISBN 978-0-198-78070-0.
- The United States and the End of the Cold War: Implications, Reconsiderations and Provocations. New York, NY: Oxford University Press. 1992. ISBN 978-0-195-05201-5.
- The Long Peace: Inquiries into the History of the Cold War. New York, NY: Oxford University Press. 1987. ISBN 978-0195043365.
- Strategies of Containment: A Critical Appraisal of Postwar American National Security Policy. New York, NY: Oxford University Press. 2005 [1982]. ISBN 978-0195174489.
- Russia, the Soviet Union and the United States: An Interpretive History. New York, NY: McGraw-Hill. 1990 [1978]. ISBN 978-0-075-57258-9.
- The United States and the Origins of the Cold War, 1941–1947. New York, NY: Columbia University Press. 2000 [1972]. ISBN 978-0-231-12239-9.

=== Articles and chapters ===
- "Grand Strategies in the Cold War". In Melvyn P. Leffler and Odd Arne Westad, eds., The Cambridge History of the Cold War, Volume II: Crises and Détente (pp. 1–21). Cambridge: Cambridge University Press. 2010. ISBN 978-0-521-83720-0.
- "Ending Tyranny: The past and future of an idea". The American Interest (Sep–Oct 2008). Archived from the original on 25 May 2013.
- Gaddis, John Lewis (2005). "Grand Strategy in the Second Term". Foreign Affairs. 84 (1): 2–15. doi:10.2307/20034202. JSTOR 20034202.
- "A Grand Strategy of Transformation". Foreign Policy (Nov–Dec 2002): 50–57.
- "On Starting All Over Again: A Naïve Approach to the Study of the Cold War". In Odd Arne Westad, ed., Reviewing the Cold War: Approaches, Interpretations, Theory (pp. 27–42). London & Portland, OR: Frank Cass. 2000. ISBN 978-0-714-65072-2.
- Gaddis, John Lewis (1993). "The Tragedy of Cold War History". Diplomatic History. 17 (1): 1–16. doi:10.1111/j.1467-7709.1993.tb00156.x.
- Gaddis, John Lewis (1992). "The Cold War, the Long Peace, and the Future". Diplomatic History. 16 (2): 234–246. doi:10.1111/j.1467-7709.1992.tb00499.x.
- Gaddis, John Lewis (1989). "Intelligence, Espionage, and Cold War Origins". Diplomatic History. 13 (2): 191–212. doi:10.1111/j.1467-7709.1989.tb00051.x.
- Gaddis, John Lewis (1983). "The Emerging Post-Revisionist Synthesis on the Origins of the Cold War". Diplomatic History. 7 (3): 171–190. doi:10.1111/j.1467-7709.1983.tb00389.x.
- "The Cold War: Some Lessons for Policy Makers". Naval War College Review. 27 (3): 2–15. 1974.

== See also ==
- Containment
- Historiography of the Cold War
