= Richard Davies (physician) =

English physician

Richard Davies M.D. (died 1761) was an English physician.

== Life ==
Davies was a native of Shropshire. On 19 August 1726 he entered Queens' College, Cambridge as a pensioner, where his relation, John Davies was president. There he became a fellow, proceeding B.A. in 1730, M.A. in 1734, and M.D. in 1748.

Davies practised as a physician at Shrewsbury, and then at Bath, Somerset, where he died at the beginning of 1762. Elected a fellow of the Royal Society on 8 June 1738, he withdrew two years later. His will, bearing date 11 December 1743, was proved on 6 March 1762 by his widow, Jane.

== Works ==
Davies was the author of:

- The General State of Education in the Universities: with a particular view to the philosophic and medical education: set forth in an epistle to … Doctor Hales, …, being introductory to essays on the blood, Bath, 1759. Anonymous Observations in reply appeared the same year.
- To promote the experimental Analysis of the Human Blood. Essay the first (no more published), Bath, 1760.

He published a dissertation, Tables of Specific Gravities, with Observations, in vol. xlv. of the Philosophical Transactions, pp. 416–89.

== Notes ==
Attribution

This article incorporates text from a publication now in the public domain: Stephen, Leslie, ed. (1888). "Davies, Richard (d.1762)". Dictionary of National Biography. Vol. 14. London: Smith, Elder & Co.
