= George F. Kennan: An American Life =

Biography of George F. Kennan written by John Lewis Gaddis

- Author: John Lewis Gaddis
- Language: English
- Genre: Biography
- Publisher: W. W. Norton & Company
- Publication date: November 10, 2011 (hardcover); September 3, 2012 (paperback)
- Publication place: United States
- Pages: 800
- ISBN: 978-1594203121

George F. Kennan: An American Life is a nonfiction book about U.S. diplomat George F. Kennan by John Lewis Gaddis that won the 2012 Pulitzer Prize for Biography or Autobiography and the National Book Critics Circle Award for biography.

Pulitzer.org describes this as "an engaging portrait of a globetrotting diplomat whose complicated life was interwoven with the Cold War and America’s emergence as the world’s dominant power". In The New York Times in November 2011, Henry Kissinger said, the book "bids fair to be as close to the final word as possible on one of the most important, complex, moving, challenging and exasperating American public servants". In April 2012 and after the Pulitzer prize was announced, Jonathan Haslam of The Guardian presented its review as a discussion of a "Pulitzer-winning life of an opponent of McCarthy and George Bush". Fred Kaplan's review in The New York Times described the book as "an epic work—probing, engrossing, occasionally revelatory—but also a well-timed one".

According to a review in The Economist, the circumstances of the biography were that Gaddis began conducting interviews and accumulating papers from Kennan in 1981 with the expectation that a posthumous biography would be published. Kennan was 78 at the time, but he did not die until 2005, which changed the context in which the book was published due to contemporaneous concerns about "economic misery and questions about the future of American dominance in international affairs". Kennan granted access on the condition that the publication be posthumous.

Gideon Rachman of The Financial Times describes Kennan as "a rare example of a diplomat who changed history through the power of his ideas and the clarity of his writing". Kissinger reminds us that "the highest position he ever held was ambassador to Moscow for five months in 1952 and to Yugoslavia for two years in the early 1960s". Kennan won two Pulitzer Prizes including one for his own 1967 Memoirs.

Gaddis' book was also reviewed by Frank Costigliola in The New York Review of Books, by John Gray in the New Statesman, by Alex Danchev in Times Higher Education, and by Rajiv Bhatia in The Hindu.

On April 16, 2012, it was announced that the 2012 Pulitzer Prize for Biography or Autobiography would be awarded for George F. Kennan: An American Life.
