= Bibliography of George Washington =

Selected list of works about George Washington

This bibliography of George Washington is a selected list of written and published works about George Washington (1732–1799). A 2019 count estimated the number of books about George Washington at some nine hundred; add scholarly articles with Washington's name in the title and the count climbs to six thousand.

It covers his life in general or in part and includes primary sources containing Washington's works, letters, records, diaries, etc. The literature on Washington is immense, his biographers and editors having lived in four separate centuries. Many of the publications listed here lend themselves to Washington in a biographical capacity, while many cover specific events and other topics where Washington is the central or an important figure. Publications covering subjects such as 'The Winter at Valley Forge', 'The Battle of Brooklyn' and Washington's farewell address are well placed and can be found in this bibliography. Washington was diligent about keeping records, maintained many diaries throughout his adult life, and corresponded with many prominent figures, family members and friends. At this late date nearly all of Washington's writings have been studied, transcribed, organized, edited and published by a large number of historians over the years, providing the basis by which the many biographical accounts of Washington's life have been written.

== Washington overview ==
George Washington (February 22, 1732 [O.S. February 11, 1731] – December 14, 1799) was the first president of the United States (1789–1797), the commander-in-chief of the Continental Army during the American Revolutionary War, and one of the Founding Fathers of the United States. He presided over the convention that drafted the current United States Constitution and during his lifetime was called the "father of his country", and widely considered so by many historians today. Washington left volumes of letters, diaries and other documents that historians continue to draw on for insight into Washington's life and early American history overall.

== Evolution of Washington biographies ==
Biographies of George Washington number nearly as many as those for all other major figures in the American Revolution combined, and comprise only a portion of the literature on Washington altogether.

The first biographer of George Washington was Mason Weems, famous for his anecdote of the young Washington chopping down a cherry tree, i.e."I cannot tell a lie...", who first published his The Life of George Washington in 1800 and subsequently in 1804–1807 (Note: Weems' account of the young Washington and the cherry tree did not appear until his book's fifth edition was published in 1806. The story originated from a neighbor of the Washington family and is the only known account. There is much speculation and conjecture offered by some historians but none have proven or disproven the story. George Washington's great-nephew, Austin Washington, claims that if Weems had made up the story he would have more dramatically depicted the young Washington 'chopping down' the cherry tree, not merely "barking it" i.e.taking some of the bark off.) setting the tone for many popular biographies that eventually followed. Washington was so central to the story of the American Revolution and the government after 1787 that virtually all the early histories celebrated him as the model American and president. They were handicapped however by lack of access to his private papers and by haphazard availability of his official papers as general and president.

A number of years after Washington's death passed before much of the finer and more intimate biographical information on Washington began to emerge, as this information could only be found in Washington's letters and diaries, most of which were still in the hands of family members and other private individuals. The greater public only had access to accounts from newspapers and various official documents. It was not until 1833 that a more comprehensive account of Washington's personal life became known. The first such account was authored by Jared Sparks, considered the best-informed man on Washington in his day and the first biographer who was given access to Washington's many letters by Washington's nephew Bushrod Washington. Sparks published The Writings of George Washington, in twelve volumes between 1833 and 1837, and The Life of George Washington in 1839. Sparks was sometimes criticized for editing Washington's spelling, grammar and various phrases.

Chief Justice John Marshall, an ardent Federalist from Virginia, greatly admired Washington, and between 1804 and 1807 published a highly detailed five-volume biography. It greatly shaped the scholarly image of Washington for the 19th century. Marshall's Life of Washington was based on records and papers also provided to him by the Washington family and reflected Marshall's Federalist principles. His revised and condensed two-volume Life of Washington was published in 1832. Historians have often praised its accuracy and well-reasoned judgments, while noting Marshall's frequent paraphrases of published sources such as William Gordon's 1801 history of the Revolution and the British Annual Register.

In the 20th century, by far the most comprehensive biography was written by Douglas Southall Freeman in seven volumes, 1948–1957. A recent evaluation of its 3582 pages concludes, "Although a few specific interpretations have been supplanted, this remains the most comprehensive study of Washington and the best place to check for specific activities, military movements, and decisions." Freeman's research was thorough, and the story is told from Washington's own viewpoint. Freeman wrote, "the great big thing stamped across that man is character." By character, says David Hackett Fischer "Freeman meant integrity, self-discipline, courage, absolute honesty, resolve, and decision, but also forbearance, decency, and respect for others." Freeman posthumously won a Pulitzer Prize in 1958 for his work, and James T. Flexner's, George Washington: The Indispensable Man, in four volumes (1965–1972), also won the Pulitzer Prize in 2005. Joseph J. Ellis, His Excellency: George Washington (2005) has frequently been praised as an interpretive essay. David Hackett Fischer's long, intense, microscopic study of the December 1775 campaign Washington's Crossing (2004) likewise won a Pulitzer Prize in 2005. Washington: A Life (2010), written by historian Ron Chernow, won Chernow a Pulitzer Prize in 2011. You Never Forget Your First (2020), written by historian Alexis Coe, is the third complete biography of Washington written by a female author. In her book, Coe chronicles Washington's life and seeks to deconstruct conclusions that have been reached about him, particularly those drawn by male historians and biographers.

== Primary sources and documents ==
After Washington died at the age of 67, the huge volumes of his writings and documents were bequeathed to his nephew, Bushrod Washington. Not long after Washington's death Bushrod prevailed upon several authors to write Washington's biography. He first approached Washington's old friend and compatriot John Marshall (Note: Marshall, present with Washington during the winter of at Valley Forge, had announced Washington's death in 1799, had offered the eulogy, oversaw and arranged the funeral ceremony and was head of commission that planned the Washington monument.) to write a biography, offering all of Washington's letters, manuscripts and diaries to help in the effort, to which Marshall agreed, subsequently producing his five-volume biography of George Washington, first published between 1804 and 1807. With its many references to various letters and documents, Marshall's five-volume work became the sole comprehensive source for Washington and his life that served advanced readers for several decades. Finally in 1833 Bushrod also allowed Jared Sparks access to Washington's letters, and in 1839 Sparks published his two-volume, The Life of George Washington, which drew on the same abundance of primary sources. He also produced a large 12-volume work outlining Washington's writings, published between 1833 and 1837. Sparks was sometimes criticized for silently editing Washington's spelling, grammar and various phrases.

Another major compilation of Washington's writings was published from 1889 to 1893 by historian Worthington Chauncey Ford in a fourteen-volume set of The Writings of George Washington. The next major compilation did not appear until John Clement Fitzpatrick compiled and edited a thirty-nine volume work, also entitled, The Writings of George Washington, (1931–1944), using much of the same original manuscript sources as Sparks and Ford. Historian Donald Jackson and Dorothy Twohig in 1984 published what is now considered by historian John R. Alden the best edition of Washington's diaries, in six volumes.

The Library of Congress has a comprehensive bibliography, as well as online scans of diaries, letterbooks, financial papers and military papers.

== Biographical ==
- Abbott, Jacob (1865). Washington. Sheldon & Company. (eBook)
- Achenbach, Joel (2004). The Grand Idea: George Washington's Potomac and the Race to the West. New York: Simon & Schuster. ISBN 0684848570.
- Adams, Henry (1911). The Life of George Washington. Houghton Mifflin Company. ISBN 978-0598475435. (eBook)
- Alden, John R. (1984). George Washington. A biography. LSU Press. ISBN 978-0807141083.
- Ambler, Charles Henry (1936). George Washington and the West. University of North Carolina Press. ISBN 978-0807802069.
- Baker, William Spohn (1886). Character Portraits of Washington as Delineated by Historians, Orators and divines. HardPress Publishing. (eBook)
- —— (1889). Bibliotheca Washingtoniana: A Descriptive List of the Biographies and Biographical Sketches of George Washington. Robert M. Lindsay. (eBook}
- Bancroft, Aaron (1807). An essay on the life of George Washington. Worcester, Ma.: Thomas & Sturtevant. (eBook)
- —— (1826). The life of George Washington, commander in chief of the American army, through the revolutionary war; and the first president of the United States. Boston, T. Bedlington. (eBook)
- Betts, William W. (2013). The Nine Lives of George Washington. iUniverse. ISBN 978-1475985177.
- Billias, George Athan (1994). George Washington's Generals and Opponents: Their Exploits and Leadership. Da Capo Press. ISBN 978-0306805608.
- Blanchard, Charles A. (1910). Washington. Was Washington a freemason?. Chicago, Ill., National Christian Association.
- Boller, Paul F. (1963). George Washington & Religion. Dallas: Southern Methodist University Press. ISBN 978-0684831428. OCLC 563800860.
- Bourne, Miriam Anne (1982). First Family: George Washington And His Intimate Relations. W. W. Norton & Company.
- Brookhiser, Richard (1996). Founding Father: Rediscovering George Washington. New York: Free Press. ISBN 0684822911.
- Brumwell, Stephen (2012). George Washington, Gentleman Warrior. Great Britain, Quercus Publishers. ISBN 978-1849165464.
- Buchanan, John (2004). The Road to Valley Forge: How Washington Built the Army That Won the Revolution. Hoboken, N.J: John Wiley & Sons. ISBN 978-0471441564.
- Burns, James MacGregor; Dunn, Susan (2004). George Washington. New York: Times Books. ISBN 978-0805069365.
- Callahan, Charles Hilliard (1913). Washington, the man and the mason. National Capital Press.
- Calloway, Colin (2018). The Indian World of George Washington: The First President, the First Americans, and the Birth of the Nation. New York: Oxford University Press. ISBN 978-0190652166.
- Carrington, Henry Beebee (1899). Washington, the soldier. Charles Scribner's sons. (eBook)
- Caven, John (1900). Washington; a mason. Indianapolis, Press of W. B. Burford.
- Chadwick, Bruce (2005). George Washington's War: The Forging of a Revolutionary Leader and the American Presidency. Sourcebooks, Inc. ISBN 978-1402226106.
- —— (2007). General and Mrs. Washington: The Untold Story of a Marriage and a Revolution. Sourcebooks, Inc.
- Chernow, Ron (2010). Washington: A Life. New York: Penguin Press. ISBN 978-1594202667. WP article
- Claudy, C. H. (1931). Washington's home and fraternal life. Masonic Service Association.
- Coe, Alexis (2020). You Never Forget Your First. Viking Press. ISBN 978-0735224100. WP article
- Connell, Janice T. (2007) [2003]. The Spiritual Journey of George Washington. Hatherleigh Press. ISBN 978-1578262489.
- Washington, George (1879). Conway, Moncure Daniel (ed.). George Washington and Mount Vernon. Vol. 13. Brooklyn, N.Y., Long Island Historical Society. (eBook)
- Corey, John (1809). The life of George Washington, first president, and commander in chief of the armies of the United States of America;. M'Carty & White, New York. (eBook)
- Courtenay, Calista McCabe. George Washington. George Washington public domain audiobook at LibriVox
- Cunliffe, Marcus (1982). George Washington, Man and Monument. Boston: Little, Brown. ISBN 978-0931917301. OCLC 58007859.
- Dalzell, Robert F. Jr.; Dalzell, Lee Baldwin (1998). George Washington's Mount Vernon: At Home in Revolutionary America. New York: Oxford University Press. ISBN 0195121147.
- Decatur, Stephen Jr.; Lear, Tobias (1933). Private Affairs of George Washington: From the Records and Accounts of Tobias Lear, Esquire, His Secretary. Houghton Mifflin.
- Douglas, Thomas (1853). Washington a free mason [sic]. Tallahassee, Printed at the Sentinel office.
- Edwards, Roberta (2009). Who was George Washington?. illustrated by True Kelley. New York: Grosset & Dunlap. ISBN 978-0448448923. Juvenile audience
- Ellis, Joseph J. (2004). His Excellency: George Washington. New York: Alfred A. Knopf. ISBN 1400040310., Wikipedia article on book
- Espinosa, Gastón (2009). Religion and the American Presidency: George Washington to George W. Bush with Commentary and Primary Sources. New York: Columbia University Press. ISBN 978-0231143325.
- Ferling, John E. (2000). Setting the World Ablaze: Washington, Adams, Jefferson, and the American Revolution. New York: Oxford University Press. ISBN 0195134095.
- —— (2009). The Ascent of George Washington: The Hidden Political Genius of an American Icon. New York: Bloomsbury Press. ISBN 978-1596914650.
- —— (2010) [1988]. First of Men: A Life of George Washington. New York: Oxford University Press. ISBN 978-0195398670.
- Fischer, David Hackett (2004). Washington's Crossing. Oxford, England; New York: Oxford University Press. ISBN 0195170342. WP article for Pulitzer Prize–winning book
- Fleming, Thomas (2006). Washington's Secret War: The Hidden History of Valley Forge. Harper Collins. ISBN 978-0060872939.
- —— (2015). The Great Divide: The Conflict between Washington and Jefferson that Defined a Nation. Da Capo Press. ISBN 978-0306822360.
- Fishman, Ethan M.; Pederson, William D.; Rozell, Mark J., eds. (2001). George Washington, Foundation of Presidential Leadership and Character. Westport, Conn: Praeger. ISBN 0275968685.
- Fitzpatrick, John Clement (2009) [1923]. Calendar of the Correspondence of George Washington. BiblioBazaar. ISBN 978-1113650139.
- —— (1933). George Washington himself; a common-sense biography written from his manuscripts. Indianapolis: Bobbs-Merrill Co. OCLC 9249378.
- Flexner, James Thomas (1965). George Washington: the Forge of Experience, 1732–1775. Boston: Little, Brown. OCLC 426484.
- —— (1972). George Washington: Anguish and Farewell 1793–1799. Boston: Little, Brown. ISBN 978-0316286022.
- —— (1979). Washington: The Indispensable Man. Boston: Little, Brown. ISBN 0316286052.
- Ford, Paul Leicester (1898). The True George Washington. Lippincott. (eBook)
- Fraser, Flora (2015). The Washingtons: George and Martha, "Join'd by Friendship, Crown'd by Love". Knopf. ISBN 978-0307272782.
- Freeman, Douglas Southall (1948–1957). George Washington, a Biography. Vol. 7. New York: Scribner. OCLC 732644234. Pulitzer Prize–winning book
- Gregg, Gary L. II; Spalding, Matthew, eds. (1999). Patriot Sage: George Washington and the American Political Tradition. Wilmington, Del: ISI Books. ISBN 1882926382.
- Grizzard, Frank E. Jr. (2005). The Ways of Providence: Religion & George Washington. Buena Vista, Va: Mariner Pub. ISBN 0976823810.
- Guernsey, Lucy Ellen (1876). Washington and seventy-six. American Sunday-school Union.
- Harless, Richard. George Washington and Native Americans: "Learn Our Arts and Ways of Life" (Fairfax: George Mason University Press, 2018. 300 pp) online review
- Harvey, Tamara; O'Brien, Greg, eds. (2004). George Washington's South. Gainesville: University Press of Florida. ISBN 081302689X.
- Hale, Edward Everett (1888). The life of George Washington. G. P. Putnam's sons. {eBook)
- Harrison, Adrienne M. (2015). A Powerful Mind: The Self-Education of George Washington. University of Nebraska Press. ISBN 978-1612347912.
- Hayes, Kevin J. (2017). George Washington: A Life in Books. New York: Oxford University Press. ISBN 978-0190456672.
- Henriques, Peter R. (2006). Realistic Visionary: A Portrait of George Washington. Charlottesville: University of Virginia Press. ISBN 0813925479.
- Henriques, Peter. "The Final Struggle between George Washington and the Grim King: Washington's Attitude toward Death and an Afterlife." Virginia Magazine of History and Biography 107#1 (1999): 73–97.
- Higginbotham, Don (1987). George Washington and the American Military Tradition. Athens: University of Georgia Press. ISBN 0820307866.
- Higginbotham, Don, ed. (2001). George Washington Reconsidered. Charlottesville: University Press of Virginia. ISBN 0813920051.
- —— (2002). George Washington: Uniting a Nation. Lanham, Md: Rowman & Littlefield Publishers. ISBN 0742522083.
- —— (2005). George Washington and the Jews. University of Delaware Press. ISBN 978-0874139273.
- Hofstra, Warren R., ed. (1998). George Washington and the Virginia Backcountry. Madison, Wis: Madison House. ISBN 0945612508.
- Hughes, Rupert (1926). George Washington: The Rebel and the Patriot... New York: W. Morrow & Co. OCLC 17399028. (eBook)
- Humphreys, David (2006). Life of General Washington. University of Georgia Press. ISBN 978-0820328249.
- Irving, Washington (1856). Life of George Washington. Vol. 1. G.P. Putnam's sons. (eBook)

- —— (1856). Life of George Washington. Vol. 2. G.P. Putnam's sons. (eBook)
- —— (1856). Life of George Washington. Vol. 3. G.P. Putnam's sons. (eBook)
- —— (1857). Life of George Washington. Vol. 4. G.P. Putnam's sons. (eBook)
- —— (1869). Life of George Washington. Vol. 5. G.P. Putnam's sons. (eBook)

- Johnson, Bradley Tyler (1894). General Washington. Appleton and Company.
- Johnson, Paul (2005). George Washington: The Founding Father. New York: Atlas Books/HarperCollins. ISBN 006075365X.
- Johnston, Elizabeth Bryant (1894). George Washington Day by Day. Library Reprints, Incorporated. ISBN 978-0722289464. (eBook)
- Johnstone, William Jackson (1919). George Washington the Christian. Abingdon Press. (eBook)
- Kapsch, Robert J. (2007). The Potomac Canal: George Washington and the Waterway West. Morgantown, W.V: West Virginia University Press. ISBN 978-1933202181.
- Knollenberg, Bernhard (1964). George Washington: the Virginia period, 1732–1775. Duke University Press. ISBN 978-1933202181.
- Kwasny, Mark Vincent (1998). Washington's Partisan War, 1775–1783. Kent State University Press. ISBN 978-0873386111.
- Leckie, Robert (2010) [1993]. George Washington's War: The Saga of the American Revolution. Harper Collins. ISBN 978-0062015365.
- Leibiger, Stuart E. (1999). Founding Friendship: George Washington, James Madison, and the Creation of the American Republic. Charlottesville: University Press of Virginia. ISBN 0813918820.
- Lengel, Edward G. (2005). General George Washington: A Military Life. New York: Random House. ISBN 1400060818.
- —— (2012). A Companion to George Washington. John Wiley & Sons. ISBN 978-1118219928.
- —— (2016). First Entrepreneur: How George Washington Built His – and the Nation's – Prosperity. Edward Lengel. ISBN 978-0306823480.
- Lewis, Thomas A. (1993). For King and Country: The Maturing of George Washington, 1748–1760. HarperCollins Publishers. ISBN 978-0060167776.
- Lillback, Peter A.; Newcombe, Jerry (2006). George Washington's Sacred Fire. Bryn Mawr, Pa: Providence Forum Press. ISBN 097860525X., 1187 pages
- Lodge, Henry Cabot (1889). George Washington. Vol. 1. Boston: Houghton, Mifflin and Co. ISBN 978-0722284902. OCLC 659431169. (eBook)
- —— (1889). George Washington. Vol. 2. Boston: Houghton, Mifflin and Co. OCLC 659431169. (eBook)
- Mann, Barbara Alice (2005). George Washington's War on Native America. Westport, Conn: Praeger. ISBN 0275981770.
- Marling, Larl (1988). George Washington Slept Here: Colonial Revivals and American Culture, 1876–1986. Harvard University Press. ISBN 978-0674349513.
- Marshall, John; Washington, Bushrod (1804). The life of George Washington. Vol. 1. C.P. Wayne. OCLC 03459836. (eBook)

- ——; Washington, Bushrod (1804). The life of George Washington. Vol. 2. C.P. Wayne. OCLC 3658046. (eBook)
- —— (1804). The life of George Washington. Vol. 3. C.P. Wayne. OCLC 3658046. (eBook)
- —— (1804). The life of George Washington. Vol. 4. C.P. Wayne. OCLC 1548385. (eBook)
- —— (1807). The life of George Washington. Vol. 5. C.P. Wayne. OCLC 1548385. (eBook)
- The life of Washington public domain audiobook at LibriVox (audio book, 5 volumes)

- Foran, William A. "John Marshall as a Historian" American Historical Review 43#1 (1937) pp. 51–64 online

- McDonald, Forrest (1974). The Presidency of George Washington. Lawrence, Kan: University Press of Kansas. ISBN 0700601104.
- McGuire, Edward Charles (1836). The Religious Opinions and Character of Washington. Harper & Brothers. (eBook)
- Morgan, Edmund S. (1980). The Genius of George Washington. New York: Norton. ISBN 0393014401.
- Middlekauff, Robert (2015). Washington's Revolution: The Making of America's First Leader. ISBN 978-1101874240. (Excerpt: the revolution from General Washington's perspective)
- Mitchell, Silas Weir (1904). The youth of Washington : told in the form of an autobiography. The Century Co., New York. Youth of Washington public domain audiobook at LibriVox
- Morrison, Jeffry H. (2009). The Political Philosophy of George Washington. Baltimore, Md: Johns Hopkins University Press. ISBN 978-0801891090.
- Guizot, M. Francis; Reeve, Henry (1840). Washington. John Murray. (eBook)
- Nelson, James (2008). George Washington's Secret Navy: How the American Revolution Went to Sea. McGraw Hill Professional. ISBN 978-0071643429.
- —— (2010). George Washington's Great Gamble: And the Sea Battle That Won the American Revolution. McGraw Hill Professional. ISBN 978-0071743174.
- Novak, Michael. Washington's God: Religion, Liberty, and the Father of Our Country (Basic Books, 2007).
- O'Brien, Conor Cruise (2009). First in Peace: How George Washington Set the Course for America. Foreword by Christopher Hitchens. Cambridge: Da Capo Press. ISBN 978-0306816192.
- O'Connell, Robert L. Revolutionary: George Washington at War (Random House, 2019). excerpt
- O'Keefe, Kieran J. "Faith before Creed: The Private and Public Religion of George Washington." Journal of Religious History 43.3 (2019): 400–418. https://doi.org/10.1111/1467-9809.12607
- Palmer, Dave Richard (2012). George Washington's Military Genius. Regnery Publishing. ISBN 978-1596983137.
- Paulding, James Kirke (1835). A Life of Washington. Vol. 1. George Clark and Son. (eBook)
- —— (1835). A Life of Washington. Vol. 2. George Clark and Son. (eBook)
- Peterson, Barbara Bennett (2005). George Washington, America's Moral Exemplar. New York: Nova History Publications. ISBN 1594542309.
- Phelps, Glenn A. (1993). George Washington and American Constitutionalism. Lawrence, Kan: University Press of Kansas. ISBN 0700605649.
- Prussing, Eugene Ernst (1927). The estate of George Washington, deceased. Little, Brown, and Company.
- Ramsay, David (1832). The Life of George Washington: Commander in Chief of the Armies of the United States of America, Throughout the War which Established Their Independence, and First President of the United States. Joseph Jewett, and cushing & Sons. (eBook)
- Randall, Willard Sterne (1997). George Washington: A Life. New York: Henry Holt & Co. ISBN 0805027793.
- Rasmussen, William M. S.; Tilton, Robert S. (1999). George Washington – the Man Behind the Myths. Charlottesville: University Press of Virginia. ISBN 0813919002.
- Reed, Anna C. (1832). Life of Washington. American Sunday school union. ISBN 978-0890515785.
- Rowe, Jonathan (2008). "Washington, George (1732–1799)". In Hamowy, Ronald (ed.). The Encyclopedia of Libertarianism. Thousand Oaks, CA: Sage, Cato Institute. pp. 535–37. doi:10.4135/9781412965811.n325. ISBN 978-1412965804. LCCN 2008009151. OCLC 750831024.
- Schmidt, Ferdinand. George Washington. George Washington public domain audiobook at LibriVox
- Scudder, Horace Elisha (1889). George Washington: An Historical Biography. Houghton, Mifflin. (eBook)
- Simpson, Stephen (1833). The lives of George Washington and Thomas Jefferson with a parallel. Henry Young Printers, Philadelphia. ISBN 978-1104351892.
- Smith, Richard Norton (1993). Patriarch: George Washington and the New American Nation. Boston: Houghton Mifflin. ISBN 0395524423.
- Sparks, Jared (1839). The Life of George Washington. Ferdinand Andrews, Boston. (eBook)
- —— (1839). The life of George Washington, commander-in-chief of the American armies, and first president of the United States. Vol. 2. London Henry Colburn Publishers. (eBook)
- Stewart, David O. (2021). George Washington: The Political Rise of America's Founding Father. New York: Dutton.
- Thompson, Ray (1971). Washington at Germantown. Bicentennial Press. ASIN B0006CC2FS.
- Washington, Austin (2014). The Education of George Washington: How a forgotten book shaped the character of a hero. Regnery Publishing. ISBN 978-1621572053.
- Weems, Mason Locke (1833) [1800]. The Life of George Washington: With Curious Anecdotes, Equally Honourable to Himself, and Exemplary to His Young Countrymen. Joseph Allen Publishers.
- Wilson, Woodrow (2004) [1905]. George Washington. Cosimo, Inc.; Original publisher: Harper and Brothers. ISBN 1596050071.
- Wister, Owen (1907). The seven ages of Washington; a biography. New York, The Macmillan Company. (eBook)

== Events, government and ideas ==
- Alberts, Robert C. (1975). A charming field for an encounter: the story of George Washington's Fort Necessity. National Park Service, U.S. Dept. of the Interior.
- Allen, William Barclay (2008). George Washington: America's First Progressive. Peter Lang. ISBN 978-1433103711.
- Anderson, Fred (2006) [2000]. Crucible of War: The Seven Years' War and the Fate of Empire in British North America, 1754–1766. New York: Alfred A. Knopf. ISBN 978-0375406423.
- —— (2006). The War That Made America: A Short History of the French and Indian War. New York: Viking. ISBN 978-0670034543.
- Baldwin, Leland D. (1939). Whiskey Rebels: The Story of a Frontier Uprising. University of Pittsburgh Press. ISBN 978-0822990536.
- Bartoloni-Tuazon, Kathleen (2014). For Fear of an Elective King: George Washington and the Presidential Title Controversy of 1789. Cornell University Press. ISBN 978-0801471902.
- Beck, Derek W. (2016). The War Before Independence: 1775–1776. Sourcebooks, Inc. ISBN 978-1492633105.
- Bemis, Samuel Flagg (2013). The Diplomacy Of The American Revolution. Read Books Ltd. ISBN 978-1447485155.
- Bickham, Troy O. (January 2002). "Sympathizing with Sedition? George Washington, the British Press, and British Attitudes during the American War of Independence". The William and Mary Quarterly. 59 (1). Omohundro Institute of Early American History and Culture: 101–122. doi:10.2307/3491639. ISSN 0043-5597. JSTOR 3491639.
- Binney, Horace (1859). An inquiry into the formation of Washington's Farewell address. Philadelphia: Parry & McMillan. (eBook)
- Blackaby, Anita D. (1986). Washington and the American Revolution: A Guide to the Campaigns in Pennsylvania & New Jersey. Council of American Revolutionary Sites. ISBN 978-0961632304.
- Bodle, Wayne (2010). Valley Forge Winter: Civilians and Soldiers in War. Penn State Press. ISBN 978-0271045467.
- Bordewich, Fergus M. (2016). The First Congress: How James Madison, George Washington, and a Group of Extraordinary Men Invented the Government. Simon and Schuster. ISBN 978-1451692136.
- Bowen, Clarence Winthrop (1892). The history of the Centennial celebration of the inauguration of George Washington as first president of the United States, Part 1. D. Appleton and Company, New York.
- Boughton, Willis A. (1944). The Battle of Brooklyn. Exposition Press.
- Breen, T.H. (2016). George Washington's Journey: The President Forges a New Nation. Simon and Schuster. ISBN 978-1451675443.
- Breen, Eleanor E.; White, Esther C. (2006). "A Pretty Considerable Distillery – Excavating George Washington's Whiskey Distillery" (PDF). Quarterly Bulletin of the Archeological Society of Virginia. 61 (4). Archeological Society of Virginia. Archived from the original (PDF) on December 24, 2011.
- Busch, Noel Fairchild (1974). Winter Quarters: George Washington and the Continental Army at Valley Forge. Liveright publishers. ISBN 978-0871405876.
- Carbone, Gerald M. (2010). Washington: Lessons in Leadership. Palgrave Macmillan. ISBN 978-0230617070.
- Carson, Hampton L. (1919). Washington at Valley Forge. The Pennsylvania Magazine of History and Biography. (eBook)
- Carp, E. Wayne (1990). To Starve the Army at Pleasure: Continental Army Administration and American Political Culture, 1775–1783. UNC Press Books. ISBN 978-0807842690.
- Clary, David A. (2011). George Washington's First War: His Early Military Adventures. Simon and Schuster. ISBN 978-1439181126.
- Cleland, Hugh (1956). George Washington in the Ohio Valley. University of Pittsburgh Press. ISBN 978-0822975373.
- Cohen, Sheldon S. (April 1991). "Monuments to Greatness: George Dance, Charles Polhill, and Benjamin West's Design for a Memorial to George Washington". Virginia Magazine of History and Biography. 99 (2): 187–203. JSTOR 4249215.
- Combs, Jerald A. (1970). The Jay Treaty: Political Battleground of the Founding Fathers. University of California Press. ISBN 978-0520015739.
- Davis, Burke (1975). George Washington and the American Revolution. Random House. ISBN 978-0394463889.
- Edling, Max; Kastor, Peter J. (2021). Washington's Government: Charting the Origins of the Federal Administration. B. Fagal, Princeton University. ISBN 978-0813946146.
- Elkins, Stanley M.; McKitrick, Eric (1995) [1993]. The Age of Federalism. New York: Oxford University Press. ISBN 978-0195093810. the leading scholarly history of the 1790s
- Ellis, Joseph J. (2015). The Quartet: Orchestrating the Second American Revolution, 1783–1789. Knopf Doubleday Publishing Group. ISBN 978-0385353410.
- Estes, Todd (2001). "The Art of Presidential Leadership: George Washington and the Jay Treaty". Virginia Magazine of History and Biography. 109 (2). Virginia Historical Society: 127–58. ISSN 0042-6636. Archived from the original on 2011-12-05.
- Falkof, Lucille (1989). George Washington, 1st President of the United States. Garrett Educational Corporation. ISBN 978-0944483190.
- Ferling, John (2007). Almost a Miracle. Oxford University Press. ISBN 978-0199758470.
- Fitzpatrick, John Clement (1929). The George Washington Scandals, Volume 356. Washington Society of Alexandria.
- —— (1970) [1924]. The Spirit of the Revolution: New Light from Some of the Original Sources of American History. Associated Faculty Pr Inc. ISBN 978-0804612685.
- Fiske, John (1891). The American Revolution, Volume 1. Houghton Mifflin.
- —— (1896). The American Revolution, Volume 2. Riverside Press.
- The Great Divide: The Conflict between Washington and Jefferson that Defined a Nation. Da Capo Press. 2015. ISBN 978-0306821271.
- Fowler, William M. (4 October 2011). American Crisis: George Washington and the Dangerous Two Years After Yorktown, 1781–1783. Bloomsbury Publishing USA. ISBN 978-0802778093.
- Freedman, Russell (2008). Washington at Valley Forge. New York: Holiday House. ISBN 978-0823420698.
- Gallagher, John J (2009). The Battle of Brooklyn 1776. Da Capo Press. ISBN 978-0786751327.
- Galowitz, Sam W. (2007). Revolutionary War, Battle of Brooklyn. Xlibris Corporation. ISBN 978-1425768607.
- Gingrich, Newt; Forstchen, William R.; Hanser, Albert S. (2010). Valley Forge: George Washington and the Crucible of Victory. St. Martin's Press. ISBN 978-1429939782.
- Greenberg, Allan Carl (1999). George Washington, Architect. Papadakis Publisher. ISBN 978-1901092189.
- Harned, David Baily (2015). Leadership and Unnatural Virtues: George Washington and the Patience of Power; In Patience: How We Wait Upon the World. Wipf & Stock. ISBN 978-1498217583. Revised and excerpted as "George Washington and the Patience of Power." Modern Age: A Quarterly Review 57, no. 4 (Fall 2015): 35–43.
- Heidler, David S.; Heidler, Jeanne (2015). Washington's Circle: The Creation of the President. Random House Publishing Group. ISBN 978-0679603832.
- Higginbotham, Don (July 1, 1990). "The Washington Theme in Recent Historical Literature". Pennsylvania Magazine of History and Biography. 114 (3). Historical Society of Pennsylvania: 423–38. Archived from the original on May 26, 2012.
- Hogeland, William (2006). The Whiskey Rebellion. Schriber. ISBN 978-0743254908.
- Hough, Franklin Benjamin (1865). Washingtoniana, or, Memorials of the death of George Washington : giving an account of the funeral honors paid to his memory, with a list of tracts and volumes printed upon the occasion.
- Hünemörder, Markus (2006). The Society of the Cincinnati: Conspiracy and Distrust in Early America. Berghahn Books. ISBN 978-1845451073. (Washington was president of the Society)
- Jenkins, Charles Francis (1905). Washington in Germantown: Being an Account of the Various Visits of the Commander-in-chief and First President to Germantown, Pennsylvania. W.J. Campbell. (eBook)
- Johnston, Henry Phelps (1878). The campaign of 1776 around New York and Brooklyn. Brooklyn, N.Y.: Long island historical Society. (eBook)
- Kahler, Gerald E. (2003). Washington in glory, America in tears. University of Virginia Press.
- —— (2008). The Long Farewell: Americans Mourn the Death of George Washington. University of Virginia Press. ISBN 978-0813927503.
- Kilmeade, Brian; Don, Yaege (2013). George Washington's Secret Six: The Spy Ring That Saved the American Revolution. Penguin Press. ISBN 978-0698137653.
- Kohn, Richard H. (1970). "The Inside History of the Newburgh Conspiracy". The William and Mary Quarterly. 27 (2): 187–220. doi:10.2307/1918650. JSTOR 1918650.
- —— (1972). "The Washington's Administration to Crush the Whiskey rebellion". The Journal of American History. 59 (3). Free Press: 567–584. doi:10.2307/1900658. JSTOR 1900658.
- —— (1975). Eagle and Sword: The Federalists and the Creation of the Military Establishment in America, 1783–1802. Oxford University Press. ISBN 978-0029175514.
- LaBan, Craig (February 21, 2010). "Hercules: Washington's Chef". The Philadelphia Inquirer.
- Larson, Edward (2014). The Return of George Washington: Uniting the States, 1783–1789. Harper Collins. ISBN 978-0062248695.
- Lefkowitz, Arthur S. (2003). George Washington's Indispensable Men: The 32 Aides-de-camp who Helped Win American Independence. Stackpole Books. ISBN 978-0811716468.
- Lender, Mark Edward, and Garry Wheeler Stone. Fatal Sunday: George Washington, the Monmouth Campaign, and the Politics of Battle (University of Oklahoma Press, 2016).
- Loss, Richard. "The Political Thought of President George Washington." Presidential Studies Quarterly 19#3 (1989): 471–490. online
- Lossing, Benson John (1870). Washington and the American republic. Vol. 1. New York, Virtue & Yorston. (eBook)
- —— (1870). Washington and the American republic. Vol. 2. (eBook)
- —— (1870). Washington and the American republic. Vol. 3. (eBook)
- McDonald, Robert M. S. (2013). Sons of the Father: George Washington and His Protégés. University of Virginia Press. ISBN 978-0813934396.
- Manca, Joseph (2012). George Washington's Eye: Landscape, Architecture, and Design at Mount Vernon. JHU Press. ISBN 978-1421405612.
- Mazyck, Walter H. (1932). George Washington and the Negro. Associated Publishers, Incorporated.
- McCullough, David (2005). 1776. Simon and Schuster. ISBN 978-0743287708. WP article: 1776
- Miller, John Chester (1960). The Federalist Era, 1789–1801. New York: Harper. ISBN 978-0061330278. OCLC 425211.
- Muñoz, Vincent Phillip (Winter 2003). "George Washington on Religious Liberty". The Review of Politics. 65 (1). University of Notre Dame: 11–33. doi:10.1017/S0034670500036512. ISSN 0034-6705. JSTOR 1408786. S2CID 145801676.
- Penniman, James Hosmer (1951). George Washington at Mount Vernon on the Potomac. The Mount Vernon Ladies Association of the Union.
- Philbrick, Nathaniel (2016). Valiant Ambition: George Washington, Benedict Arnold, and the Fate of the American Revolution. Penguin Press. ISBN 978-0698153233.
- Ray, Smith Eugnie Marie (2009). The Battle of Brooklyn. BiblioBazaar. ISBN 978-1113547613.
- Richards, Dave (2014). Swords in Their Hands: George Washington and the Newburgh Conspiracy. Pisgah Press. ISBN 978-0985387587.
- Royster, Charles (1979). A Revolutionary People at War: The Continental Army and American Character, 1775–1783. University of North Carolina Press. ISBN 978-0807846063.
- Sears, Louis Martin (1960). George Washington & the French Revolution. Wayne State University Press.
- Slaughter, Philip (1886). Christianity, the Key to the Character and Career of Washington: A Discourse Delivered Before the Ladies of the Mt. Vernon Association. T. Whittaker. (eBook)
- Spalding, Matthew (Autumn 1996). "George Washington's Farewell Address". The Wilson Quarterly. 20 (4). Woodrow Wilson International Center for Scholars: 65–71. ISSN 0363-3276. Archived from the original on 2012-05-02.
- Vadakan, Vibul V. (Winter–Spring 2005). "A Physician Looks At The Death of Washington". The Early America Review. 6 (1). DEV Communications. ISSN 1090-4247.
- Varg, Paul A. (1963). Foreign Policies of the Founding Fathers. Baltimore: Penguin Books.
- Wallenborn, White McKenzie (5 November 1997). "George Washington's Terminal Illness: A Modern Medical Analysis of the Last Illness and Death of George Washington". The Papers of George Washington. University of Virginia. Archived from the original on 13 April 2005.
- White, Leonard D. (1948). The Federalists: A Study in Administrative History. New York: Macmillan Co. OCLC 1830658.
- Williams, Tony; Knott, Stephen F. (2015). Washington and Hamilton: The Alliance That Forged America. Sourcebooks, Inc. ISBN 978-1492609841.
- Wood, Gordon S. (Spring 1992). "The Greatness of George Washington". The Virginia Quarterly Review. 68 (2). University of Virginia: 189–207. ISSN 2154-6932.
- Wrong, George McKinnon (1921). Washington and his comrades in arms; a chronicle of the war of independence. Yale University Press, New Haven. (eBook)

=== Espionage ===
- Allen, Thomas B. George Washington, Spymaster: How the Americans Outspied the British and Won the Revolutionary War (2004)
- Harty, Jared B. "George Washington: Spymaster and General Who Saved the American Revolution" (Staff paper, No. ATZL-SWV. Army Command And General Staff College Fort Leavenworth, School Of Advanced Military Studies, 2012) online.
- Kaplan, Roger. "The Hidden War: British Intelligence Operations during the American Revolution." William and Mary Quarterly (1990) 47#1: 115–138. online
- Kilmeade, Brian, and Don Yaeger. George Washington's Secret Six: The Spy Ring that Saved the American Revolution (Penguin, 2016).
- Mahoney, Harry Thayer, and Marjorie Locke Mahoney. Gallantry in action: A biographic dictionary of espionage in the American revolutionary war (University Press of America, 1999).
- Misencik, Paul R. Sally Townsend, George Washington's Teenage Spy (McFarland, 2015).
- O'Toole, George J.A. Honorable Treachery: A History of US Intelligence, Espionage, and Covert Action from the American Revolution to the CIA (2nd ed. 2014).
- Rose, Alexander (2007). Washington's Spies: The Story of America's First Spy Ring. Random House Publishing Group. ISBN 978-0307418708.
- Van Doren, Carl. Secret History of the American Revolution: An Account of the Conspiracies of Benedict Arnold and Numerous Others Drawn from the Secret Service (1941) online free

=== Slavery ===
- Dunbar, Erica Armstrong (2017). Never Caught: The Washingtons' Relentless Pursuit of Their Runaway Slave, Ona Judge. New York, New York: Simon & Schuster. ISBN 978-1501126390.
- Furstenberg, François. "Atlantic Slavery, Atlantic Freedom: George Washington, Slavery, and Transatlantic Abolitionist Networks." William and Mary Quarterly 68.2 (2011): 247–286. online
- Hirschfeld, Fritz (1997). George Washington and Slavery: A Documentary Portrayal. Columbia: University of Missouri Press. ISBN 0826211356.
- Morgan, Kenneth. "George Washington and the Problem of Slavery." Journal of American Studies 34#2 (2000): 279–301.
- Morgan, Philip D. "'To Get Quit of Negroes': George Washington and Slavery." Journal of American Studies 39#3 (2005): 403–429.
- Ragsdale, Bruce A.. Washington at the Plow: The Founding Farmer and the Question of Slavery (Harvard University Press, 2021) online review
- Schwarz, Philip J. (2001). Slavery at the Home of George Washington. Mount Vernon, Va: Mount Vernon Ladies' Association. ISBN 978-0931917387.
- Thomas, Ebony Elizabeth, James Joshua Coleman, and Lindsay R. Cicchino. "George Washington and Slavery." Social Education 82.3 (2018): 143–148. online
- Thompson, Mary V. "The Only Unavoidable Subject of Regret": George Washington, Slavery and the Enslaved Community at Mount Vernon. 2019. University of Virginia Press.
- Wiencek, Henry (2003). An Imperfect God: George Washington, His Slaves, and the Creation of America. New York: Farrar, Straus and Giroux. ISBN 0374175268.

=== Historiography and memory ===
- Brandt, Lydia Mattice. First in the Homes of His Countrymen: George Washington's Mount Vernon in the American Imagination (U of Virginia Press, 2016). xii, 284 pp
- Bruggerman, Seth C. (2011). Here, George Washington Was Born: Memory, Material Culture, and the Public History of a National Monument. University of Georgia Press. ISBN 978-0820342726.
- Cavitch, Max. The Man That Was Used Up: Poetry, Particularity, and the Politics of Remembering George Washington American Literature 75#2 (2003) doi:10.1215/00029831-75-2-247 online
- Chinard, Gilbert, ed. George Washington as the French Knew Him: A Collection of Texts (Princeton UP, 1940).
- Cohen, Sheldon S. "Monuments to Greatness: George Dance, Charles Polhill, and Benjamin West's Design for a Memorial to George Washington." Virginia Magazine of History and Biography 99#2 (1991), pp. 187–203 online
- Drozdowski, Marian Marek, Ludwik Krzyzanowski, And Gerard T. Kapolka. "George Washington In Polish Historiography And Historical Periodicals." The Polish Review (1989): 127–172. online
- Galke, Laura J. "Who’s the bomb? George’s mom! haunting biographies of George Washington." International Journal of Heritage Studies 25.7 (2019): 689–707. https://doi.org/10.1080/13527258.2018.1542332
- Grizzard, Frank E. Jr. (2002). George Washington: A Biographical Companion. ABC-CLIO. ISBN 1576070824.
- —— (2005). George!: A Guide to All Things Washington. Mariner Pub. ISBN 0976823802.
- Hay, Robert. "George Washington: American Moses," American Quarterly 21#4 (1969): 780–791 online
- Knox, Amanda. "Imagining George Washington: A Historiography of George Washington in Historical Memory." North Alabama Historical Review 5.1 (2015): 7+. online
- Lengel, Edward G. Inventing George Washington: America's founder, in myth and memory (Harper Collins, 2011). excerpt
- Levy, Philip (2013). Where the Cherry Tree Grew: The Story of Ferry Farm, George Washington's Boyhood Home. Macmillan & Co. ISBN 978-1250023148.
- Longmore, Paul K. The Invention of George Washington (Univ. of Virginia Press, 1999).
- Madison, Ann (1932). History of the George Washington bicentennial celebration. Washington, D.C., United States George Washington Bicentennial Commission. (eBook)
- Marling, Karal Ann. George Washington Slept Here: Colonial Revivals and American Culture, 1876–1986 (Harvard University Press, 1988).
- Olszewski, George J. A History of the Washington Monument, 1844–1968, Washington, D.C. (National Park Service, 1971).
- Wilstach, Paul (1918). Mount Vernon: Washington's Home and the Nation's Shrine. The Bobbs-Merrill Company.
- Savage, Kirk. Monument Wars: Washington, D.C., the National Mall, and the Transformation of the Memorial Landscape (2009).
- Schwartz, Barry. "Social change and collective memory: The democratization of George Washington." American Sociological Review (1991): 221–236. online
- Schwartz, Barry. "George Washington and the Whig Conception of Heroic Leadership," American Sociological Review 48#1 (1983) : 18–33.
- Schwartz, Barry (1987). George Washington: The Making of an American Symbol. Free Press. ISBN 978-0029281413.
- Treese, Lorett (2010). Valley Forge: Making and Remaking a National Symbol. Penn State Press. ISBN 978-0271041735.
- "George Washington in Popular Culture" Digital Encyclopedia of George Washington (2020)

== Primary sources ==
The greater volume of George Washington's known letters were first edited and published in the 19th century by several prominent historians. These works form the basis of all other such publications that followed.

- Washington, George (1754). The journal of Major George Washington: sent by the Hon. Robert Dinwiddie, Esq; His Majesty's Lieutenant-governor, and commander in chief of Virginia, to the commandant of the French forces on Ohio: To which are added, the governor's letter and a translation of the French officer's answer. With a new map of the country as far as the Mississippi. London: Williamsburgh printed, London, reprinted for T. Jefferys. OCLC 67325346.
- —— (1983–1995). Abbot, W. W.; et al. (eds.). The Papers of George Washington. Vol. 10. Charlottesville: University Press of Virginia. ISBN 0813909120.
- —— (1988). Allen, W. B (ed.). George Washington: A Collection. Indianapolis: Liberty Classics. ISBN 0865970599.
- —— (1951). Baughman, Roland (ed.). "Washington's Manuscript Diaries of 1795 and 1798". The Papers of the Bibliographical Society of America. 45 (2): 117–24. doi:10.1086/pbsa.45.2.24298667. JSTOR 24298667. S2CID 179397958.
- —— (1905). Bixby, William K; Samson, William Holland (eds.). Letters from George Washington to Tobias Lear. Genesee press, Rochester, N.Y.
- —— (1973). Boynton, Edward C; Carlisle, Edward (eds.). General orders of George Washington, Commander-in-Chief of the Army of Revolution, issued at Newburgh on the Hudson, 1782–1783. Harrison, N.Y., Harbor Hill Books.
- Chinard, Gilbert, ed. (1969) [1940]. George Washington as the French Knew Him: A Collection of Texts. New York: Greenwood Press.
- Corry, John (1809). The life of George Washington, first president, and commander in chief of the armies of the United States of America;. M'Carty & White.
- —— (1810). Biographical memoirs of the illustrious general George Washington, late president of the United States of America, and commander in chief of their armies during the Revolutionary War. M'Carty & White.
- —— (1970) [1931–1944]. Fitzpatrick, John Clement (ed.). The Writings of Washington from the Original Manuscript Sources, 1745–1799. 39 vols. Washington, D.C.: U.S. Govt. Printing Office; reprint, New York: Greenwood Press: United States George Washington Bicentennial Commission, and published by authority of Congress.; LC Call Number: E312.7 1931 39 volume biographical listing

- —— (1915). John Clement Fitzpatrick (ed.). Calendar of the correspondence of George Washington, commander in chief of the Continental Army. Vol. 1. Government Printing Office.
- —— (1915). John Clement Fitzpatrick (ed.). Calendar of the correspondence of George Washington, commander in chief of the Continental Army. Vol. 2. Government Printing Office.
- —— (1915). John Clement Fitzpatrick (ed.). Calendar of the correspondence of George Washington, commander in chief of the Continental Army. Vol. 3. Government Printing Office.
- —— (1915). John Clement Fitzpatrick (ed.). Calendar of the correspondence of George Washington, commander in chief of the Continental Army. Vol. 4. Government Printing Office.

- Washington, George (1939). Fitzpatrick, John Clement (ed.). The Last Will and Testament of George Washington & Schedule of His Property. Mount Vernon Ladies' Association of the Union. ASIN B00CXK89RQ.

- —— (1925). Fitzpatrick, John Clement (ed.). The Diaries of George Washington, 1748–1799. Vol. 1. Houghton Mifflin.
- —— (1925). Fitzpatrick, John Clement (ed.). The Diaries of George Washington, 1748–1799. Vol. 2. Houghton Mifflin.
- —— (1925). Fitzpatrick, John Clement (ed.). The Diaries of George Washington, 1748–1799. Vol. 3. Houghton Mifflin.
- —— (1925). Fitzpatrick, John Clement (ed.). The Diaries of George Washington, 1748–1799. Vol. 4. Houghton Mifflin.

- —— (1889–1893). Ford, Worthington C (ed.). The Writings of George Washington. Vol. 14 v. New York & London: G. P. Putnam's Sons. OCLC 1637240.

- —— (1898). Hamilton, Stanislaus Murray (ed.). Letters to Washington, and accompanying papers, 1752–1756. Vol. 1. The Society of the Colonial Dames of America. (eBook)
- —— (1899). Hamilton, Stanislaus Murray (ed.). Letters to Washington, and accompanying papers, 1756–1758. Vol. 2. Houghton, Mifflin and Company. ISBN 978-0722289112. (eBook)
- —— (1898). Hamilton, Stanislaus Murray (ed.). Letters to Washington, and accompanying papers, 1758–1770. Vol. 3. The Society of the Colonial Dames of America. (eBook)
- —— (1898). Hamilton, Stanislaus Murray (ed.). Letters to Washington, and accompanying papers, 1770–1774. Vol. 4. The Society of the Colonial Dames of America. (eBook)
- —— (1898). Hamilton, Stanislaus Murray (ed.). Letters to Washington, and accompanying papers, 1774–1775. Vol. 5. The Society of the Colonial Dames of America. (eBook)

- —— (1905). Hulbert, Archer Butler (ed.). Washington and the West; being George Washington's diary of September, 1784. Century Company, New York.
- —— (1970). Kitman, Marvin (ed.). George Washington's Expense Account. New York: Simon and Schuster. ISBN 0671205897.
- —— (1906). Jared Sparks (ed.). Letters and Recollections of George Washington:
  Being Letters to Tobias Lear and Others Between 1790 and 1799, Showing the First American in the Management of His Estate and Domestic Affairs. Archibald Constable and Company Limited. (eBook download options)
- —— (1997). Rhodehamel, John H (ed.). Writings. New York: Library of America: Distributed by Penguin Books. ISBN 188301123X.
- —— (1915). Sachse, Julius Friedrich (ed.). Washington's masonic correspondence as found among the Washington papers in the Library of Congress. Press of the New era printing company]. {eBook)
- —— (1892). Toner, Joseph Meridith (ed.). The daily journal of Major George Washington, in 1751–2, kept while on a tour from Virginia to the island of Barbadoes, with his invalid brother, Maj. Lawrence Washington. Albany, N.Y., J. Munsell's sons. (eBook)
- —— (1999). Twohig, Dorothy (ed.). George Washington's Diaries: An Abridgment. University Press of Virginia. ISBN 978-0813918570.

- —— (1976–1979). Twohig, Dorthy; Jackson, Donald (eds.). The Diaries of George Washington, 6 vols. University Press of Virginia.
- —— (1983–1995). Twohig, Dorthy; Abbot, W.W. (eds.). The Papers of George Washington: Colonial Series, 10 vols. University Press of Virginia.
- —— (1992–1994). Twohig, Dorthy; Abbot, W.W. (eds.). The Papers of George Washington: Confederation Series, 6 vols. University Press of Virginia.
- —— (1981). Twohig, Dorthy (ed.). The Papers of George Washington: The Journal of the Procerdings of the President, 1783–1793. University Press of Virginia.
- —— (1987–1996). Twohig, Dorthy; Abbot, W.W. (eds.). The Papers of George Washington: Presidential Series, 6 vols. University Press of Virginia.
- —— (1998). Twohig, Dorthy; Abbot, W.W. (eds.). The Papers of George Washington: Retirement Series, 1797–1799. University Press of Virginia. ISBN 978-0813918389.
- —— (1985–1991). Twohig, Dorthy; Abbot, W.W. (eds.). The Papers of George Washington: Revolutionary War Series, 7 vols. University Press of Virginia.

- —— (1800). Williams, J.M. (ed.). Washington's political legacies. Printed for John Russell and John West. {eBook}
- —— (1800). Williams, J.M. (ed.). The Life and Memorable Actions of George Washington General and Commander. Printed for John Russell and John West. {eBook}
- Wolcott, Oliver (1846). Gibbs, George (ed.). Memoirs of the administrations of Washington and John Adams, edited from the papers of Oliver Wolcott, secretary of the Treasury. Van Norden Printers. (eBook)

=== Jared Sparks ===
Jared Sparks was given access to Washington's personal writings and other documents by Bushrod Washington who had inherited them from his uncle George Washington upon his death. After a several-year effort Sparks produced his twelve-volume The Writings of George Washington, published from 1833 to 1839. (Note: Not to be confused with John C. Fitzpatrick's works of the same name . . .) Sparks was widely praised for his great effort but was sometimes criticized for his editing of Washington's spelling, grammar and various phrases.

Writings of George Washington, in 12 volumes, edited by Jared Sparks, et al
(Book titles link to respective eBooks)
- Washington, George (1834). Sparks, Jared; Paradise, John Wesley (eds.). The writings of George Washington : being his correspondence, addresses, messages, and other papers, official and private, Selected and Published from the Original Manuscripts, with illustrations and notes. Vol. 1. U.S. Government.
- —— (1834). Sparks, Jared (ed.). The Writings of George Washington: Being His Correspondence, Addresses, Messages, and Other Papers, Official and Private ... Vol. 2. U.S. Government.
- —— (1834). Sparks, Jared; Wesley, John; Gadbsy, John; Peale, Charles Willson (eds.). The writings of George Washington : being his correspondence, addresses, messages, and other papers, official and private. Vol. 3. Washington, D.C.: U.S. Government Printing Office.
- —— (1933). Sparks, Jared (ed.). The writings of George Washington from the original manuscript sources, 1745–1799. Vol. 4. Washington, D.C.: U.S. Government Printing Office.
- —— (1933). Sparks, Jared (ed.). The writings of George Washington from the original manuscript sources, 1745–1799. Vol. 5. Washington, D.C.: U.S. Government Printing Office.
- —— (1834). Sparks, Jared; Wesley, John; Gadbsy, John; Peale, Charles Willson (eds.). The writings of George Washington from the original manuscript sources, 1745–1799. Vol. 6. Washington, D.C.: U.S. Government Printing Office.
- —— (1833). Sparks, Jared (ed.). The writings of George Washington from the original manuscript sources, 1745–1799. Vol. 7. Washington, D.C.: U.S. Government Printing Office. Topics : Letters, 1780. Numerous letters to President of Continental Congress; Several letters to Lafayette, Generals Howe, Greene, Clinton, Arnold; Letters to Major Henry Lee, statesmen, etc.
- —— (1834). Sparks, Jared; Peale, Charles Willson; Durand, Asher Brown (eds.). The writings of George Washington from the original manuscript sources, 1745–1799. Vol. 8. Washington, D.C.: U.S. Government Printing Office.
- —— (1835). Sparks, Jared (ed.). The writings of George Washington: being his correspondence, addresses, messages, and other papers, official and private ... Vol. 9. U.S. Government.
- —— (1839). Sparks, Jared (ed.). The writings of George Washington: being his correspondence, addresses, messages, and other papers, official and private ... Vol. 10. U.S. Government.
- —— (1837). Sparks, Jared (ed.). The Writings of George Washington: Being His Correspondence, Addresses, Messages, and Other Papers, Official and Private ... Vol. 11. U.S. Government. download eBook
- —— (1837). Sparks, Jared (ed.). The writings of George Washington, being his correspondence, Addresses, Messages, and Other Papers, Official and Private. Vol. 12. U.S. Government.

Letters to George Washington
- Sparks, Jared (1853). Correspondence of the American Revolution, Being Letters of Eminent Men to George Washington. Vol. 1.
  Little, Brown and Company.
- —— (1853). Correspondence of the American Revolution, Being Letters of Eminent Men to George Washington. Vol. 2.
  Little, Brown and Company.
- —— (1853). Correspondence of the American Revolution, Being Letters of Eminent Men to George Washington. Vol. 3.
  Little, Brown and Company.
- —— (1853). Correspondence of the American Revolution, Being Letters of Eminent Men to George Washington. Vol. 4.
  Little, Brown and Company.

=== Worthington C. Ford ===
Worthington C. Ford published a 14 volume work, also entitled, The Writings of George Washington, in 1889–1890. Ford draws on much of the same material as did Sparks in 1834 and Fitzpatrick in 1931. In his Preface to volume 1, Ford, while praising Sparks' enormous volume of works, offers some sharp criticism about his sometimes questionable editorship of Washington's writings as Sparks would sometimes edit spelling, grammar, change or leave out phrases, etc. Ford made clear of his position here, that his editorship of Washington's writings would not be conducted in the same expedient manner that his predecessor sometimes employed.

Writings of George Washington, in 14 volumes, edited by Worthington C. Ford, et al
(Book titles link to respective eBooks)
- Washington, George (1889). Ford, Worthington C. (ed.). The Writings of George Washington, 1748–1757. Vol. 1. G.P. Putnam's Sons. – Topics: 1748–1757: Numerous letters to Gov. Dinwiddie, and military officers. Letters to William Fairfax; Notes on journey to Boston, etc.
- —— (1889). Ford, Worthington C. (ed.). The Writings of George Washington, 1758–1775. Vol. 2. G.P. Putnam's Sons.
- —— (1889). Ford, Worthington C. (ed.). The Writings of George Washington, 1775–1776. Vol. 3. G.P. Putnam's Sons.
- —— (1889). Ford, Worthington C. (ed.). The Writings of George Washington, 1776. Vol. 4. G.P. Putnam's Sons. – Topics: Numerous letters to The President of Congress and The Committee of Safety; To Joseph Reed, Governor Trumbull, Cousin Lund Washington, Richard Henry Lee; To Generals Howe, Putnam, Ward, Sullivan, Schyler, etc.
- —— (1890). Ford, Worthington C. (ed.). The Writings of George Washington, 1776–1777. Vol. 5. G.P. Putnam's Sons.
- —— (1889). Ford, Worthington C. (ed.). The Writings of George Washington, 1777–1778. Vol. 6. G.P. Putnam's Sons.
- —— (1889). Ford, Worthington C. (ed.). The Writings of George Washington, 1778–1779. Vol. 7. G.P. Putnam's Sons. ISBN 978-0469298392.
- —— (1890). Ford, Worthington C. (ed.). The Writings of George Washington, 1779–1780. Vol. 8. G.P. Putnam's Sons.
- —— (1889). Ford, Worthington C. (ed.). The Writings of George Washington, 1780–1782. Vol. 9. G.P. Putnam's Sons.
- —— (1889). Ford, Worthington C. (ed.). The Writings of George Washington, 1782–1785. Vol. 10. G.P. Putnam's Sons.
- —— (1889). Ford, Worthington C. (ed.). The Writings of George Washington, 1785–1790. Vol. 11. G.P. Putnam's Sons.
- —— (1891). Ford, Worthington C. (ed.). The Writings of George Washington, 1790–1794. Vol. 12. G.P. Putnam's Sons.
- —— (1889). Ford, Worthington C. (ed.). The Writings of George Washington, 1794–1798. Vol. 13. G.P. Putnam's Sons.
- —— (1889). Ford, Worthington C. (ed.). The Writings of George Washington, 1798–1799. Vol. 14. G.P. Putnam's Sons.

=== John Clement Fitzpatrick ===
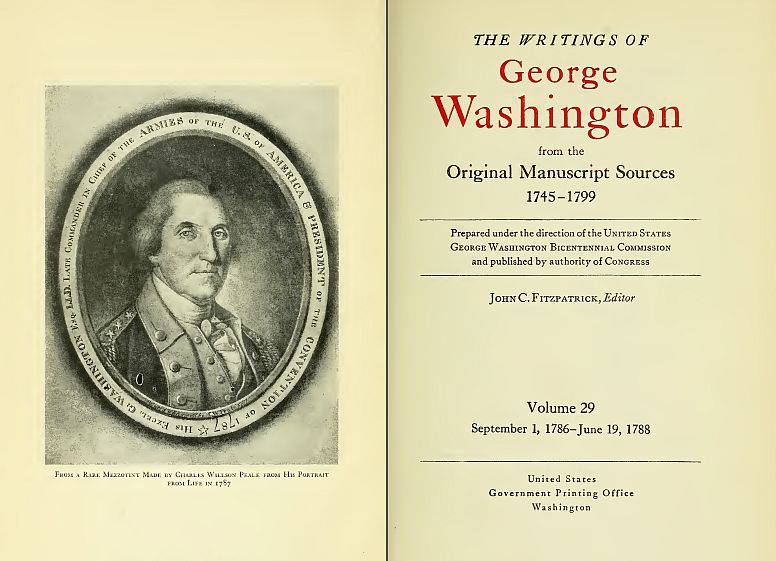
Selected title page from 39 volume series

John Clement Fitzpatrick was commissioned by the George Washington Bicentennial Commission in 1931 to transcribe, edit and publish Washington's writings in what became a 39 volume work entitled The Writings of George Washington. (Note: Not to be confused with the works of Jared Sparks and Worthington C. Ford, both of whom published similar works under the same basic title – sometimes confused with and listed together by some online listings) The Commission was created to commemorate the coming 200th anniversary of Washington's birth in 1932, and to promote education in Revolutionary War era history overall. This massive work, taken from Washington's letters, military records, diaries, etc., was edited and compiled under the direction of John Clement Fitzpatrick, and sponsored and prepared by the Commission, under the authority of U.S. Congress, 1931, taking several years to complete. The commission conducted a thorough investigation of all available books, pamphlets reports, and other material relating to the life and times of George Washington. Because the field was very broad, members of the commission found it necessary to study the requirements of selecting source material while making sure they didn't exclude any essential data, a process that Fitzpatrick oversaw for eight years until his death in 1940 before all the volumes had been published.

Writings of George Washington, in 39 volumes, edited by John C. Fitzpatrick, et al
(Book titles link to respective eBooks)
- Washington, George (1931). Fitzpatrick, John Clement (ed.). The writings of George Washington from the original manuscript sources, 1745–1799. Vol. v.1. Washington, D.C.: U.S. Government Printing Office;prepared under the direction of the United States George Washington Bicentennial Commission and published by authority of Congress.Topics: Last will—Origin of Washington family—Years as Colonel—Marriage—History Revolution, 1775–1783 Sources
- —— (1933). Fitzpatrick, John Clement; Matteson, David Maydole (eds.). The writings of George Washington from the original manuscript sources, 1745–1799. Vol. v.2. New York & London: G. P. Putnam's Sons.
- —— (1933). Fitzpatrick, John Clement; Matteson, David Maydole (eds.). The writings of George Washington from the original manuscript sources, 1745–1799. Vol. v.3. Washington, D.C.: U.S. Government Printing Office.
- —— (1933). Fitzpatrick, John Clement (ed.). The writings of George Washington from the original manuscript sources, 1745–1799. Vol. v.4. Washington, D.C.: U.S. Government Printing Office. Topics:
- —— (1932). Fitzpatrick, John Clement; Matteson, David Maydole (eds.). The writings of George Washington from the original manuscript sources, 1745–1799. Vol. v.5. Washington, D.C.: U.S. Government Printing Office. Topics:
- —— (1833). Fitzpatrick, John Clement; Matteson, David Maydole (eds.). The writings of George Washington from the original manuscript sources, 1745–1799. Vol. v.6. Washington, D.C.: U.S. Government Printing Office. Topics:
- —— (1833). Fitzpatrick, John Clement; Matteson, David Maydole (eds.). The writings of George Washington from the original manuscript sources, 1745–1799. Vol. v.7. Washington, D.C.: U.S. Government Printing Office.
  Topics: Washington, George, 1732–1799, Washington family, United States—History Revolution, 1775–1783, United States—History Confederation, 1783–1789, United States—History Sources, United States—Politics and government Sources, United States—Politics and government 1775–1783, United States—Politics and government 1783–1789
- —— (1834). Fitzpatrick, John Clement (ed.). The writings of George Washington from the original manuscript sources, 1745–1799. Vol. v.8. Washington, D.C.: U.S. Government Printing Office.
  Topics:
- —— (1933). Fitzpatrick, John Clement (ed.). The writings of George Washington from the original manuscript sources, 1745–1799. Vol. v.9. Washington, D.C.: U.S. Government Printing Office.
  Topics: Letters to Generals Gates, Thomas Nelson, Greene, Putnam, Biddle, Hazelwood; Colonel Samuel Smith; Letters to President of Congress, Commander of the Virginia Militia, Governor Patrick Henry, Sir William Howe, etc.
- —— (1933). Fitzpatrick, John Clement (ed.). The writings of George Washington from the original manuscript sources, 1745–1799. Vol. v.10. Washington, D.C.: U.S. Government Printing Office.
  Topics:
- —— (1933). Fitzpatrick, John Clement; Matteson, David Maydole (eds.). The writings of George Washington from the original manuscript sources, 1745–1799. Vol. v.11. Washington, D.C.: U.S. Government Printing Office.
  Topics:
- —— (1934). Fitzpatrick, John Clement; Matteson, David Maydole (eds.). The writings of George Washington from the original manuscript sources, 1745–1799. Vol. v.12. Washington, D.C.: U.S. Government Printing Office.
  Topics:
- —— (1931). Fitzpatrick, John Clement; Matteson, David Maydole (eds.). The writings of George Washington from the original manuscript sources, 1745–1799. Vol. v.13. Washington, D.C.: U.S. Government Printing Office. – Topics: 1778 letters to Generals Gates, Sullivan and Greene, officers, statesmen and others.
- —— (1931). Fitzpatrick, John Clement; Matteson, David Maydole (eds.). The writings of George Washington from the original manuscript sources, 1745–1799. Vol. v.14. Washington, D.C.: U.S. Government Printing Office. – Topics: Washington family
- —— (1931). Fitzpatrick, John Clement; Matteson, David Maydole (eds.). The writings of George Washington from the original manuscript sources, 1745–1799. Vol. v.15. Washington, D.C.: U.S. Government Printing Office. – Topics:
- —— (1931). Fitzpatrick, John Clement; Matteson, David Maydole (eds.). The writings of George Washington from the original manuscript sources, 1745–1799. Vol. v.16. Washington, D.C.: U.S. Government Printing Office. – Topics: 1779 letters to Generals Sullivan Gates, Officers, President of Congress; 1779 General Orders.
- —— (1931). Fitzpatrick, John Clement; Matteson, David Maydole (eds.). The writings of George Washington from the original manuscript sources, 1745–1799. Vol. v.17. Washington, D.C.: U.S. Government Printing Office. – Topics: Letters 1779, to Generals Heath, Wayne; to the President of Congress, Board of War; to Governors Trumbull, Livingston; General Orders; etc.
- —— (1931). Fitzpatrick, John Clement; Matteson, David Maydole (eds.). The writings of George Washington from the original manuscript sources, 1745–1799. Vol. v.18. Washington, D.C.: U.S. Government Printing Office. – Topics: Letters to Officers, General Orders, February 10 to June 11, 1780
- —— (1931). Fitzpatrick, John Clement; Matteson, David Maydole (eds.). The writings of George Washington from the original manuscript sources, 1745–1799. Vol. v.19. Washington, D.C.: U.S. Government Printing Office.
- —— (1931). Fitzpatrick, John Clement; Matteson, David Maydole (eds.). The writings of George Washington from the original manuscript sources, 1745–1799. Vol. v.20. Washington, D.C.: U.S. Government Printing Office.
- —— (1931). Fitzpatrick, John Clement; Matteson, David Maydole (eds.). The writings of George Washington from the original manuscript sources, 1745–1799. Vol. v.21. Washington, D.C.: U.S. Government Printing Office. – Topics : General Orders & Letters, Dec.1780 – Apr.1781: Letters to – Generals, e.g.Greene, Heath, Howe; Numerous letters to Colonel Timothy Pickering; – to President of Congress, Gov. Clinton.
- —— (1931). Fitzpatrick, John Clement; Matteson, David Maydole (eds.). The writings of George Washington from the original manuscript sources, 1745–1799. Vol. v.22. Washington, D.C.: U.S. Government Printing Office.
- —— (1931). Fitzpatrick, John Clement; Matteson, David Maydole (eds.). The writings of George Washington from the original manuscript sources, 1745–1799. Vol. v.23. Washington, D.C.: U.S. Government Printing Office.
- —— (1931). Fitzpatrick, John Clement; Matteson, David Maydole (eds.). The writings of George Washington from the original manuscript sources, 1745–1799. Vol. v.24. Washington, D.C.: U.S. Government Printing Office.
- —— (1931). Fitzpatrick, John Clement; Matteson, David Maydole (eds.). The writings of George Washington from the original manuscript sources, 1745–1799. Vol. v.25. Washington, D.C.: U.S. Government Printing Office.
- —— (1931). Fitzpatrick, John Clement; Matteson, David Maydole (eds.). The writings of George Washington from the original manuscript sources, 1745–1799. Vol. v.26. Washington, D.C.: U.S. Government Printing Office.
- —— (1931). Fitzpatrick, John Clement; Matteson, David Maydole (eds.). The writings of George Washington from the original manuscript sources, 1745–1799. Vol. v.27. Washington, D.C.: U.S. Government Printing Office.
- —— (1931). Fitzpatrick, John Clement; Matteson, David Maydole (eds.). The writings of George Washington from the original manuscript sources, 1745–1799. Vol. v.28. Washington, D.C.: U.S. Government Printing Office.
- —— (1931). Fitzpatrick, John Clement; Matteson, David Maydole (eds.). The writings of George Washington from the original manuscript sources, 1745–1799. Vol. v.29. Washington, D.C.: U.S. Government Printing Office.
- —— (1931). Fitzpatrick, John Clement; Matteson, David Maydole (eds.). The writings of George Washington from the original manuscript sources, 1745–1799. Vol. v.30. Washington, D.C.: U.S. Government Printing Office.
- —— (1931). Fitzpatrick, John Clement; Matteson, David Maydole (eds.). The writings of George Washington from the original manuscript sources, 1745–1799. Vol. v.31. Washington, D.C.: U.S. Government Printing Office.
- —— (1931). Fitzpatrick, John Clement; Matteson, David Maydole (eds.). The writings of George Washington from the original manuscript sources, 1745–1799. Vol. v.32. Washington, D.C.: U.S. Government Printing Office.
- —— (1931). Fitzpatrick, John Clement; Matteson, David Maydole (eds.). The writings of George Washington from the original manuscript sources, 1745–1799. Vol. v.33. Washington, D.C.: U.S. Government Printing Office.
- —— (1931). Fitzpatrick, John Clement; Matteson, David Maydole (eds.). The writings of George Washington from the original manuscript sources, 1745–1799. Vol. v.34. Washington, D.C.: U.S. Government Printing Office.
- —— (1931). Fitzpatrick, John Clement; Matteson, David Maydole (eds.). The writings of George Washington from the original manuscript sources, 1745–1799. Vol. v.35. Washington, D.C.: U.S. Government Printing Office.
- —— (1931). Fitzpatrick, John Clement; Matteson, David Maydole (eds.). The writings of George Washington from the original manuscript sources, 1745–1799. Vol. v.36. Washington, D.C.: U.S. Government Printing Office. – Topics: 1797 letters. Numerous letters to Secretary of War and nephew Bushrod Washington; letters to Secretary of State, Attorney General, Hamilton, Lafayette, family members, etc.
- —— (1931). Fitzpatrick, John Clement; Matteson, David Maydole (eds.). The writings of George Washington from the original manuscript sources, 1745–1799. Vol. v.37. Washington, D.C.: U.S. Government Printing Office. – Topics: Numerous letters to Secretary of War; Letters to Secretary of State, Maj. Gen. Alexander Hamilton, Gov. Robert Dinwiddie, other statesmen, et al.
- —— (1931). Fitzpatrick, John Clement; Matteson, David Maydole (eds.). The writings of George Washington from the original manuscript sources, 1745–1799. Vol. v.38. Washington, D.C.: U.S. Government Printing Office. – General Index A – N
- —— (1931). Fitzpatrick, John Clement; Matteson, David Maydole (eds.). The writings of George Washington from the original manuscript sources, 1745–1799. Vol. v.39. Washington, D.C.: U.S. Government Printing Office. – General Index O – Z

== See also ==
- George Washington
- George Washington and religion
- George Washington in the American Revolution
- George Washington in the French and Indian War
- George Washington's Farewell Address
- George Washington and slavery
- Legacy of George Washington
- Military career of George Washington
- Presidency of George Washington
- The Papers of George Washington
- George Washington Birthplace National Monument
- Valley Forge
- Washington family
- Bibliography of the American Revolutionary War
- Bibliography of the United States Constitution
- List of bibliographies on American history
- Speeches by George Washington
- List of George Washington articles

== Sources ==
- History of the George Washington Bicentennial Celebration. U.S. George Washington Bicentennial Commission, Washington D.C. 1932.
- Weems, Mason Locke (1833). The Life of George Washington: With Curious Anecdotes, Equally Honourable to Himself, and Exemplary to His Young Countrymen. Joseph Allen Publishers.
- "Sparks, Jared, 1789–1866. Papers of Jared Sparks : an inventory". Harvard University Library. 2005. Archived from the original on October 7, 2016.
- "Cherry Tree Myth". Mount Vernon Ladies' Association. 2016.
- Washington, Austin (2014). The Education of George Washington: How a forgotten book shaped the character of a hero. Regnery Publishing. ISBN 978-1621572053.
- Robert Dinwiddie: His Career in American Colonial Government and Westward Expansion. Arthur H. Clark Company. 1941.
- Alden, John R. (1984). George Washington. A biography. LSU Press. ISBN 978-0807141083.
- "2005 Pulitzer Prizes, Special Citations". 2005.
- "Douglas Southall Freeman (1886–1953)". Virginia Foundation for the Humanities: Encyclopedia Virginia.
- Flexner, James Thomas (1979). Washington: The Indispensable Man. Boston: Little, Brown. ISBN 0316286052.
- Washington's Crossing. Pivotal Moments in American History. Oxford University Press, review. 2016. ISBN 978-0-19-518159-3.
- "The 2011 Pulitzer Prize Winner in Biography or Autobiography". The Pulitzer Prizes – Columbia University. 2016.
- Peter J. Parish, ed. (2013). Reader's Guide to American History. Routledge. ISBN 978-1134261826. A condensed version is 754 pages long.
- Fischer, David Hackett (2006). Washington's Crossing. Oxford UP. ISBN 978-0199756674.
- Marshall, John (1832). The Life of George Washington. Vol. 5. Philadelphia: C.P. Wayne. OCLC 317838280. (Document No. 28859 – Release Date May 18, 2009) Also see: V. 1 V. 2
- "John Marshall". Mount Vernon Ladies' Association. 2013.
- "John Marshall". Library of Virginia. 2001.
