= Peter Force =

American politician and historian (1790–1868)

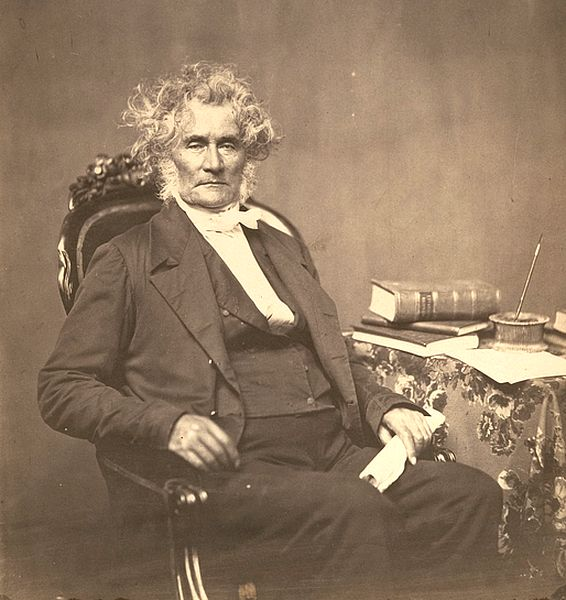
- Force, c. 1858

12th Mayor of the City of Washington, D.C.
- In office June 13, 1836 – June 8, 1840
- Preceded by: William A. Bradley
- Succeeded by: William Winston Seaton

Personal details
- Born: November 26, 1790 Passaic Falls, New Jersey, U.S.
- Died: January 23, 1868 (aged 77)
- Resting place: Rock Creek Cemetery; Washington, D.C., U.S.
- Party: Whig Party
- Occupation: Printer; editor; reporter; archivist; historian
- Known for: Peter Force Collection in The Library of Congress

Peter Force (November 26, 1790 – January 23, 1868) was an American politician, newspaper editor, printer, archivist, and early American historian. He served as Mayor of the city of Washington from 1836 to 1840.

Born in New Jersey, Force served in the Washington militia as a lieutenant during the War of 1812 and afterward was a printer. Politically, he belonged to the Whig Party and supported John Quincy Adams, leading to several government appointments in the 1820s. Later, during the international political unrest caused by the American Civil War, Force was sent to Europe by the Lincoln Administration to stabilize diplomatic relations with France and England.

Force amassed among the most extensive collections of books, manuscripts, original maps and other archival material from statesmen, and American and British military officers of the American Revolution. He is also noted for editing and publishing a massive collection of historical documents, books and maps in several volumes relating to colonial and revolutionary American history which were ultimately purchased by the Library of Congress for a large sum.

== Life and career ==
Peter Force was born near the Passaic Falls in New Jersey, the son of William Force and Sarah Ferguson. William was a soldier in the Revolutionary War and a descendant of French Huguenots who arrived on America's shores in the 17th century. His father's participation in the war largely inspired Peter's interest in history. Force grew up in New Paltz, Ulster County, New York, and afterward moved to New York City, where he was schooled in the printing trade. Force married Hannah Evans; together they had ten children, including sons William Quereau Force (1820–1880), (Note: William became an editor and clerk in the Smithsonian Institution.) Charles Force (no DOB available) and Manning Force (1824–1899), who was a noted Major General from Ohio during the American Civil War. Force was not considered a jovial man, but rather quiet and reserved, yet had an amiable personality that attracted people to him.

In 1812 Force became a member of the New York Typographical Society, which was the city's printer trade union at the time. He was initiated at its general meeting on February 1, 1812. He was elected a director on December 5, 1812, and at age twenty-two was chosen president on July 3, 1813, with his re-election following in 1814 and 1815.

During the War of 1812, Force served in the New York State Militia and rose to the rank of Sergeant and then to Lieutenant.

Force began his varied career as a journeyman printer working for William A. Davis in New York City, and performed so well he was soon made the director of the office at age sixteen. In 1815, Force's employer secured a contract for the printing of Congress, and moved to Washington, D.C., and Peter Force, at age twenty-five, followed and also became a resident and a printer in that city. Soon he formed a partnership with Davis working as the foreman and public printer in the congressional printing plant, which at the time was quite small, having only four single-pull, wooden hand presses, which were sufficient to do all the work of the Government in 1816. In that same year he joined the Columbia Typographical Society and in 1826 became its first "free member". When Davis withdrew from the partnership Force formed other partnerships, of which he was the master mind.

Early in his career in Washington Force attracted the attention of distinguished statesmen, and he was a leading character in the city throughout his life. Four years after arriving in Washington he founded and published an annual devoted to recording the facts of early American history, with its wide scope of official and statistical information. From 1820 to 1836, with a three-year interval involved in politics, he published the National Calendar, which later became the National Calendar and Annals of the United States. On November 7, 1836, the National Typographical Convention assembled in Washington, and appointed a committee of three "to wait upon Mr. Force, Mayor of this city (a member of the Columbia Typographical Society), to tender to him the good wishes of the convention, and to invite him to honor it with his presence ...and welcomed in an ardent manner by an address from the president, and by congratulations of the members of the convention individually."

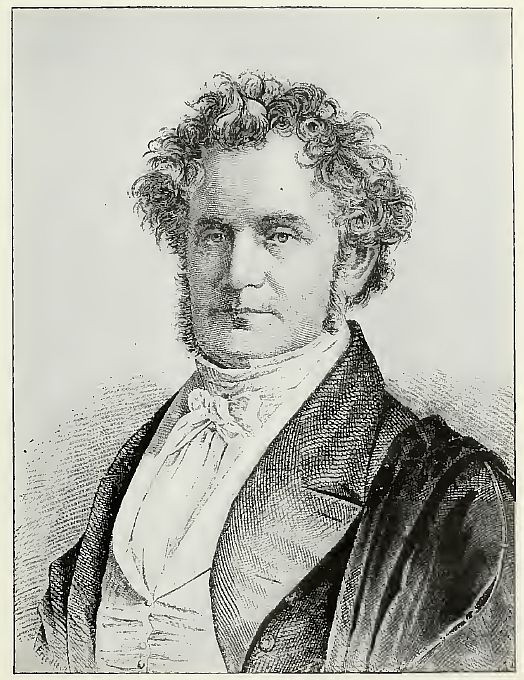
Peter Force in 1815

During the 1820s, Force was a member of the prestigious society, Columbian Institute for the Promotion of Arts and Sciences and served as the president. In 1820 he began publishing the National Calendar, a statistical annual, which lasted 16 years, ending in 1836. From November 12, 1823, to February 2, 1830, Force published the National Journal, (Note: Not to be confused with the National Journal founded in 1969) with moderate-conservative views about public concerns and issues, which became the official newspaper during the presidency of John Quincy Adams, and which also drew to its columns from some widely known contributors, including John Quincy Adams himself. At the same time the journal tried to remain neutral in politics. The journal became a daily newspaper in 1824 and continued in this capacity until 1831. In 1830, however, Force gave up his position as the newspaper's editor.

From 1820 until 1828 Force compiled, printed and published the Biennial Register, the official directory of the U.S. government. In 1827 Force was given the job of printing a 109-page supplement to the Catalogue of the Library of Congress at his printing shop in Washington on the corner of Eleventh Street and Pennsylvania Avenue. The supplement included an author index and titles contained in supplements of 1820 and 1825.

During his lifetime he was also a member of the Smithsonian Institution and the United States Naval Observatory, and played a major role in organizing the American Historical Society, in Washington in 1836. On August 22, 1822, Force was granted US Patent 3573X for a method of color printing. He also founded, published, and wrote in the National Journal (1823–1830) (Note: Not to be confused with the National Journal founded in 1969) and would later donate a stone to the Washington Monument. After vigorously supporting John Quincy Adams' election to the presidency in 1824, he served locally as councilman and alderman. During the seventh year of his residency in Washington he was elected to the City Council, then to the Board of Aldermen, and was chosen president by both bodies. He was elected mayor of Washington in 1836 and again 1838 without opposition, but when he ran again in 1848 he was defeated by a wide margin, all as a member of the Whig Party. Thereafter he became president of the National Institute for the Promotion of Science. Force was also elected a member of the American Antiquarian Society in 1851.

Up until the early 1850s, the Library of Congress lacked a geographical department and an adequate collection of maps for an institution of its size and station. Lieutenant Edward B. Hunt of the U.S. Army formulated a plan and proposed a resolution for such a department and appointed a committee to review the proposal. Force was on the committee that passed that resolution in 1856. (Note: Other committee members included: Prof. A. D. Bache, Gen. Joseph G. Totten, U. S. Army, Col. J. J. Abert, U. S. Army, Lieut. M. F. Maury, U. S. Navy, Lieut. C. H. Davis, U. S. Navy, Peter Force, Prof. A. Guyot, Lieut. B. B. Hunt, U. S. Army.) The committee stated, "There is not in the United States nor on this continent a single collection of geographical materials which is even tolerably complete." Many original and rare maps from the Force library were provided to this department.

=== Civil War ===
In November 1861, Force was sent to Europe at the recommendation of influential friends in President Lincoln's administration in a diplomatic effort to appeal to the political circles in Paris and London concerning their precarious relations with the Union and the Confederacy. Force was accompanied by Archbishop Hughes and Bishop McIlvaine with the hopes of inducing the respective governments to refrain from giving aid to the Confederacy. Force established healthy permanent relations with the various British and French statesmen. Upon returning to America in early June 1862, he received from the Corporation of New York the honor of Freedom of the City. On June 9 of that year the Typographical Society expressed their gratitude for Force's safe arrival from a mission "fraught with the safety, honor and welfare of our country," and invited him to visit its chambers so that his fellow-members could express their thanks and congratulations for his diplomatic efforts in convincing the governments and people of Europe of the Union Government's ability to defeat the Confederacy.

During the American Civil War, Peter's son, Manning Force rose through successive ranks to become a major-general in the Militia of the District of Columbia. He was present at the Battle of Vicksburg and served under William Tecumseh Sherman during Sherman's March to the Sea. During that war Peter and his son corresponded frequently.

During the Northern Virginia campaign of 1862 General Robert E. Lee and his army were getting dangerously close to Washington D.C. Charles B. Norton, a Union colonel on the staff of General Fitz John Porter was, in civilian life, also an archivist and publisher, and offered to hide and store Force's large library of Americana over the concern of a possible Confederate attack on the capitol, but Force declined his offer.

=== Historian ===
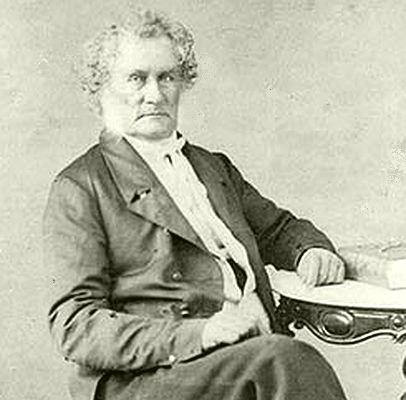
Peter Force in his elder years

Force's methods as an archivist and publisher of source materials was different in various ways from that of some of his contemporaries like Jared Sparks. Unlike Sparks, Force rarely added editorial notes and was content to let the raw documents speak for themselves. Force methodologically followed his primary rule that no manuscript should be altered, which is what set him apart from some of the editors of his day. Nothing was to be added and nothing substituted. Conversely, when Sparks edited the Papers of George Washington, as an admirer of his hero, Sparks would often correct Washington's mistakes in grammar and would sometimes alter the meaning of a statement so as to make it conform to what he felt was in Washington's mind. This was a practice Force abhorred and would never tolerate.

Force was the first historical scholar to discover that the so-called Mecklenburg Declaration of Independence of 1775 was not what it was claimed to be. Subsequently he published the declaration of independence, or Notes on Lord Mahon's History of the American Declaration of Independence.

Force's greatest achievement came as a collector and editor of historical documents. He published Tracts and Other Papers, Relating Principally to the Origin, Settlement, and Progress of the Colonies in North America (4 vol Washington, 1836–1846), which comprised rare pamphlets. His nine volume American Archives, published at intervals from 1837 to 1853, was a collection of the most important documents of the American Revolution, 1774–1776.

In 1833 he was awarded a contract with the Federal Government for the preparation, printing and publication of his massive compilation of archival material. It extended to nine volumes, which had been carefully arranged with great care and consummate skill, but after the delivery of the ninth volume the officials upon whom the law imposed the necessity of giving a viable review never managed to read the manuscripts, and the prospective publication of the work came to a standstill while Force was still eager to continue, and had many important documents and manuscripts yet to be printed. Futilely Force continued his efforts to prevail upon complacent and uninterested officers to reverse the action of their predecessors, and finally, and reluctantly, relinquished his cherished project, which he had earnestly pursued for more than 30 years.

Twenty large folio volumes were planned but only the first 9 volumes were published between 1837 and 1853. Matthew St. Clair Clarke (Note: Clarke was Clerk of the House of Representatives in 1822 and 1841.) and Force were co-publishers of Force's American Archives. Force's lifelong desire to contribute to the Library of Congress finally came to fruition in 1867 when through an act of Congress it purchased his collection of original documents for $100,000, augmenting the expansion of the Library of Congress conducted by its librarian Ainsworth Rand Spofford, (Note: Spofford wrote a biography, published 1898, of Peter Force. See Bibliography.) who directed the Library from 1865 to 1897.

During his years of pursuing and buying archival material Force carried off prizes at auctions which the other competitors were not knowledgeable of. Force traveled about the eastern seaboard of the United States "ransacking" the book-shops and attending book auctions from Boston to Charleston in his tireless search for rare volumes. On one such occasion he was a bidder against the Library of Congress for a sizable and valuable library of bound pamphlets, the property of an early collector, who had consigned them to an auction house in Philadelphia. On another occasion while in Boston Force acquired from an antiquarian bookseller the only collection of Boston Revolutionary newspapers which were offered for sale in the last twenty-five years. He was soon reproached by some visitors from New England and admonished for depriving New England of its archival treasure. He rebuffed them replying, "Why didn't you buy them yourselves, then?" Force was relentless in his efforts to acquire complete and unbroken collections of all the Washington newspapers he could lay his hands on. After some thirty years he had amassed a collection which nearly filled the basement in his home. Into his elder years Force often visited the War Department, approaching various Army officers he knew in his quest for archival material. His collection of the printed "Army orders" from the War Department was considered "a miracle of completeness".

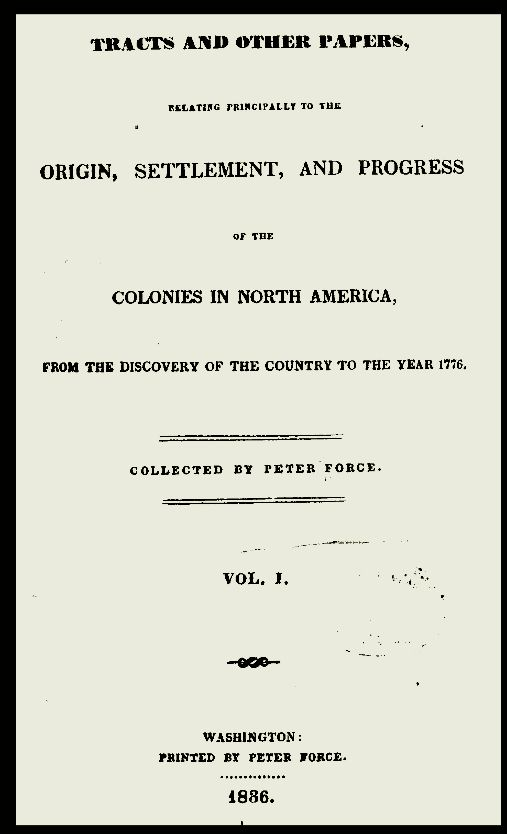
Peter Force, book cover, 1886, Origin, Settlement and Progress

In 1867 the Library of Congress and a joint Committee of Congress was formed for the purpose of examining the extensive assortment of archival material in the Peter Force library. Because of its enormous size, totaling approximately 150,000 items, it was necessary for the committee to enter closely into details, and to devote much time and assiduous effort to the task of assessing Force's library. The committee spent at least two to three hours per day, for a two month period, in the examination of every document, manuscript, book, map, etc, that passed through their hands. To help simplify matters the contents of the Force library were categorized into seven basic classes. (Note: Archivial categories: 1. Printed books relating to America. 2. Early American newspapers. 3. Pamphlets relating to America. 4. Maps. 5. Incunabula; or books printed during the infancy of the art. 6. Manuscripts and autographs. 7. MS. materials for the American Archives, or Documentary History of America.) The committee found Force's archival collection to be encompassing in many respects: "The plan of this work embraced nothing less than a complete publication of all the more important original State papers, letters, narratives, and other documents relating to the settlement and history of the United States, from the discovery of America. His library embraces an immense collection of the early American voyages, in Latin, French, Italian, Spanish, German, Dutch, and English, while in books and pamphlets relating to the politics and government of the American colonies, it stands unrivaled in this country."

Among the items in Force's collection, and considered the most valuable, are a series of original military maps and plans in manuscript, from the French and Indian War and the American Revolutionary War. Claimed by some historians to be of exceeding interest, many of them are the actual work of officers in the American and British armies. The collection of some 300 hand-drawn maps covers the entire United States from Canada to the Gulf of Mexico. Among the manuscript items in Force's library are 48 folio volumes containing historical autographs of great rarity. In 1867 Ainsworth R. Spofford edited an eight-page report of the Committee's findings and assessments. In 1875, Peter Force's son, William Q. Force, donated various personal papers he had discovered to the Library of Congress.

It wasn't until the late twentieth century was the value of Force's collection of documents, manuscripts, books and other archival material finally recognized by much of the historical community. Force's vast collection of archives possessed the only surviving copies of many important documents of the colonial and revolutionary eras and proved to be a valuable scholarly resource. Many large research libraries in the United States and around the world hold Force's nine volume published works in their collections, however, it remains a relatively underused source of information. Scholars, historians, and students alike have found the massive work difficult to navigate using Force's complicated and varied index for the wide assortment of materials. In 2001 Northern Illinois University Libraries and Professor Allan Kulikoff from the University of Georgia received a grant from the National Endowment for the Humanities to fund the digitization of Force's American Archives and their presentation in a free-use World Wide Web site.

=== Final days ===
Force maintained his ardent pursuit of collecting books, newspapers, manuscripts and other documents up until the week before he died, on January 23, 1868, at the age of 77. He is buried alongside his wife in Rock Creek Cemetery in Washington D.C. Force's grave marker was designed by German sculptor Jacques Jouvenal. It is a marble obelisk that stands 16 feet high and rests on top of a square base. A relief is carved into the obelisk of a bookshelf filled with books. The District opened the Peter Force School in 1879 on the south side of Massachusetts Avenue between 17th and 18th Streets. It was razed in 1962.

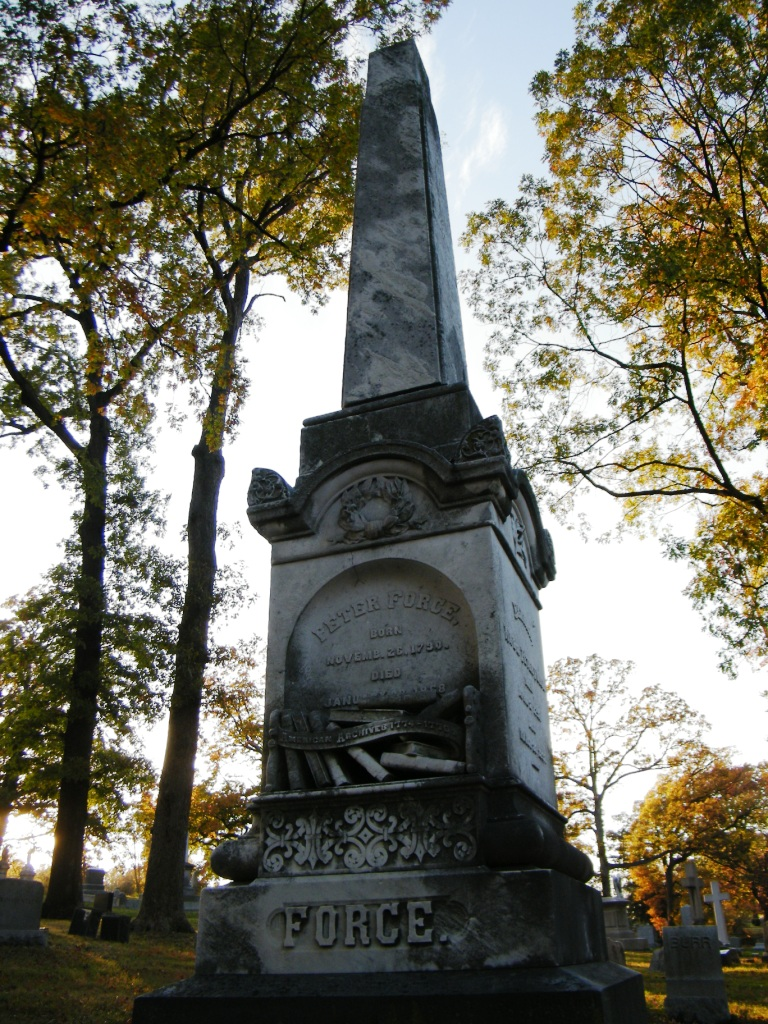
Frontside is inscribed:
Peter Force
Born November 26, 1790
Died January 23, 1868
American Archives 1774-1776

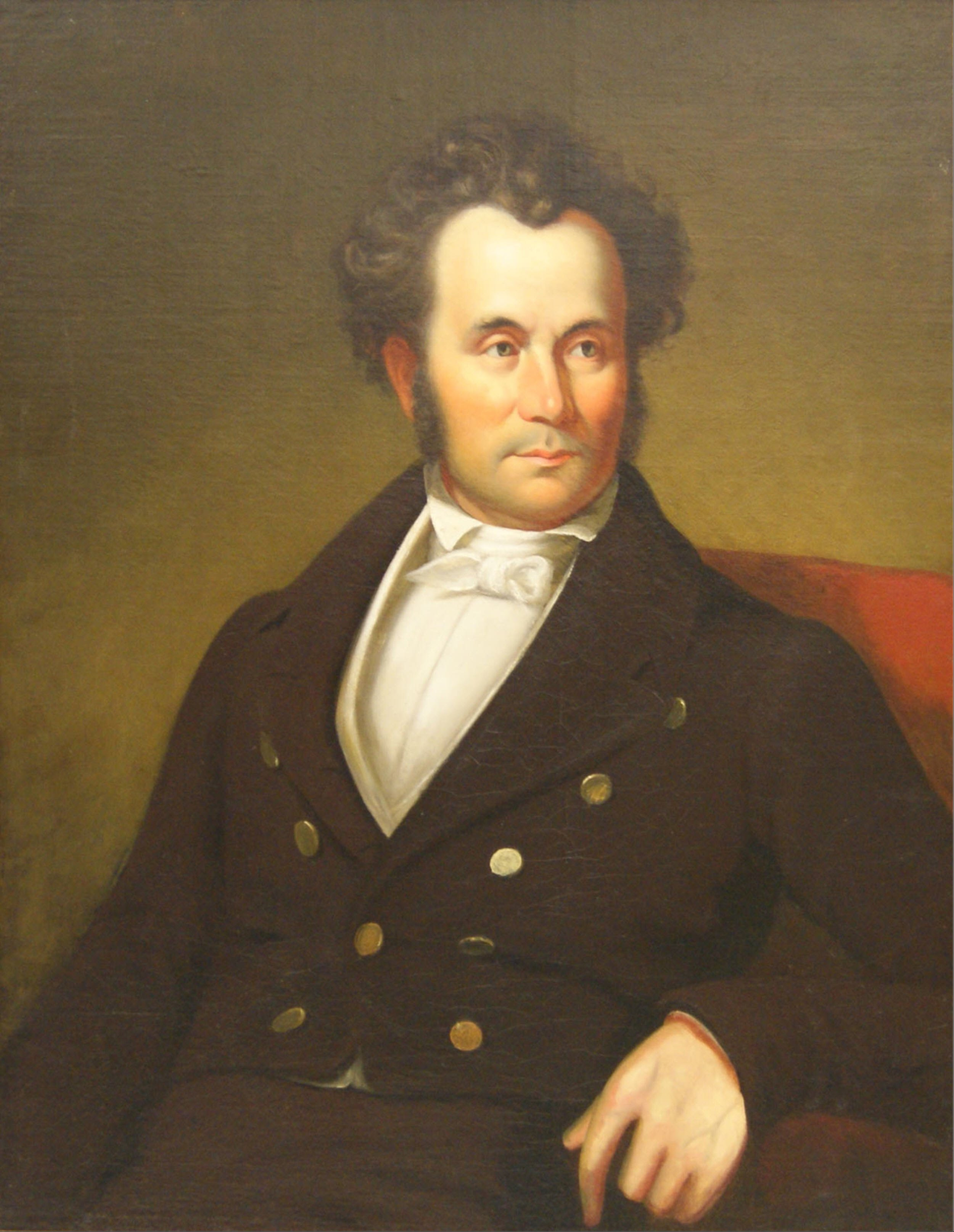
Painting of Peter Force by the Swiss artist Charles Fenderich done between c. 1835–1847

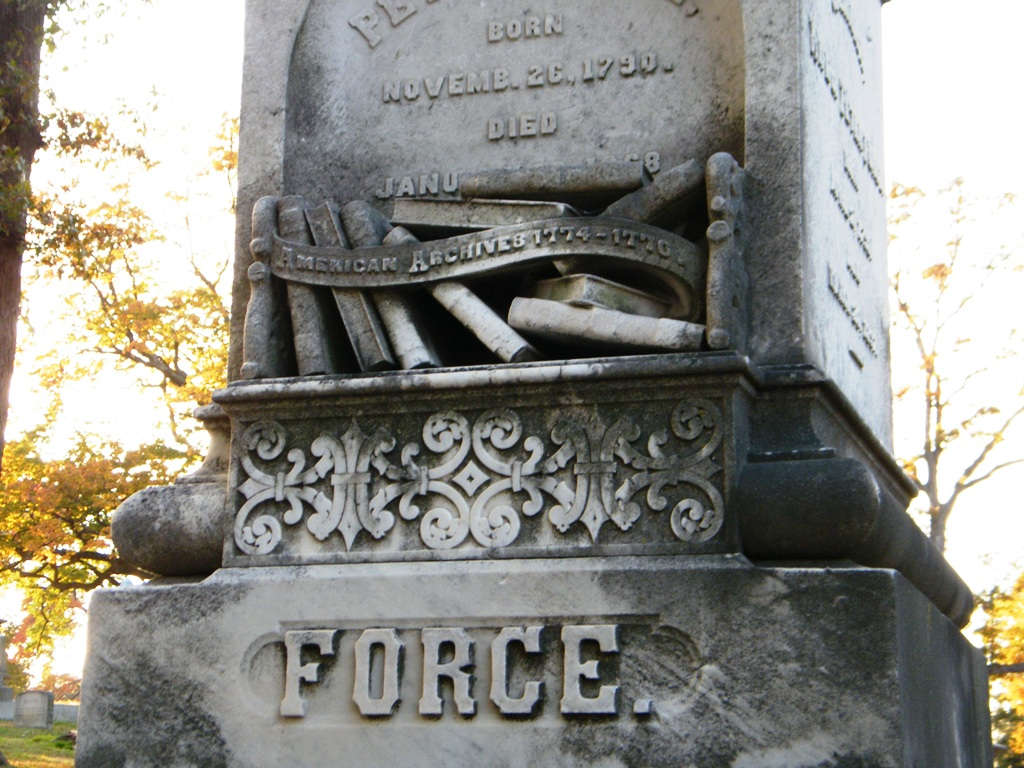
Proper right side is inscribed:
Hannah
Wife of Peter Force
Born April 2, 1798
Died March 20, 1857

== Selected works ==
- American archives: consisting of a collection of authentick records, state papers, debates, and letters and other notices of publick affairs, the whole forming a documentary history of the origin and progress of the North American colonies; of the causes and accomplishment of the American revolution; and of the Constitution of government for the United States, to the final ratification thereof. Prepared and published under authority of an act of Congress. Volumes 1, 2, 3, 4, 5, 6
- Tracts and other papers relating principally to the origin, settlement, and progress of the colonies in North America : from the discovery of the country to the year 1776. Volumes 1, 2
- The Declaration of Independence, or, Notes on Lord Mahon's History of the American Declaration of Independence

== See also ==
- John Clement Fitzpatrick - historian and archivist of the Papers of George Washington
- Worthington C. Ford – archivist of Washington and early American history
- William Wright Abbot - archivist who did extensive work editing and publishing papers of George Washington
- Howard Henry Peckham – prominent early American archivist
- Antiquarian
- Antiquarian Booksellers' Association of America
- James Kendall Hosmer, writer, historian and librarian

== Bibliography ==
- Committee of Columbia Historical Society (1899). Records of the Columbia Historical Society, Washington. Columbia Historical Society. pp. 219–233.
- Force, Peter, ed. (1837–1853). American Archives, Vol.1. Washington D.C. Printing Office.
- Force, Manning Ferguson (Summer 2007). "From Atlanta to Savannah: The Civil War Journal of Manning F. Force, November 15,1864-January 3, 1865". The Georgia Historical Quarterly. 91 (2). Georgia Historical Society: 185–205. JSTOR 40584997.
- Kaplan, Louis (July 1944). "Peter Force, collector". The Library Quarterly: Information, Community, Policy. 14 (3). The University of Chicago Press: 234–238. doi:10.1086/616966. JSTOR 4303248. S2CID 143955262.
- Harlow, Ralph V. (1964) [1931]. Malone, Dumas; Johnson, Allen (eds.). Dictionary of American Biography, Volume 3: Peter Force. New York: Scribner's.
- Hennessy, John J. (1999). Return to Bull Run: The Campaign and Battle of Second Manassas. University of Oklahoma Press. ISBN 978-0-8061-3187-0.
- Johnston, William Dawson (1904). History of the Library of Congress. Volume I, 1800-1864. Washington: Government Printing Office.
- Stevens, George A. (1913). New York Typographical Union No. 6: Study of a Modern Trade Union and Its Predecessors, Issue 6. State Department of Labor. – Google link
- Spofford, Ainsworth Rand (1898). The Life and Labors of Peter Force, Mayor of Washington. Washington, The Society.
- —— (1867). Joint Committee on the Library concerning the Historical Library of Peter Force, esq. Library of Congress.
- Sung, Carolyn Hoover. "Peter Force: Washington Printer and Creator of the American Archives." unpublished PhD dissertation George Washington U. 1985. 338 pp. DAI 1986 47(3): 1036-1037-A. DA8529622 Fulltext: in ProQuest Dissertations & Theses
- "Catalog: Peter Force papers and collection". Library of Congress. 2020.
- "Peter Force papers and collection". Library of Congress. 2020.
- Northern Illinois University, Essay (2016). "American Archives". Northern Illinois University.
- Librarian of Congress presiding (1909). Ainsworth Rand Spofford, 1825-1908 : a memorial meeting at the Library of Congress on Thursday, November 12, 1908. District of Columbia Library Association by the Webster Press.
- "American Archives: Table of Contents". Northern Illinois University. 2001.
- "Peter Force papers (1774-1868, bulk 1820-1867)". William L. Clements Library, University of Michigan. 2014.
- Hansen, Stephen A. (April 12, 2014). "The Force School: Alma Mater to Presidents' Son, a Count, and a World-Famous Aviator". InTowner Publishing Corp. Washington D.C.
- "Force Memorial, (sculpture)". Smithsonian American Art Museum, Inventories of American Painting and Sculpture. 2016.
- "Peter Force Library". Library of Congress. 2016.
- "Peter Force Library, Manuscripts and maps relating to American history, early American imprints, and incunabula". Library of Congress: Manuscript Reading Room. 2010.
