= Ferdinand Schmidt =

Ferdinand Schmidt may refer to:

== People ==
- Ferdinand Joseph Schmidt (1791–1878), Austro-Hungarian explorer and naturalist
- Ferdinand Schmidt (author) (1816–1890), German author and educator
