= John Clement Fitzpatrick =

American archivist and historian (1876–1940)

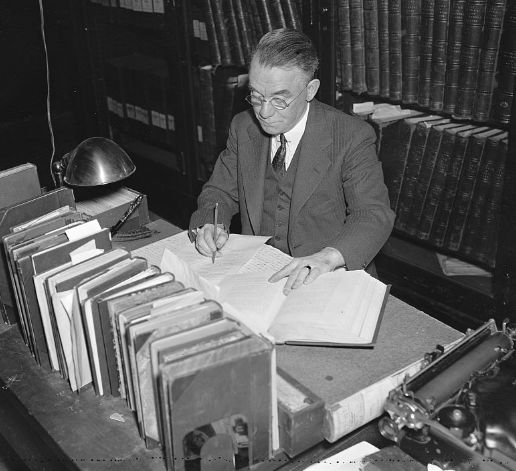
- Fitzpatrick working on the George Washington papers at the Library of Congress in 1937
- Born: August 10, 1876; Washington, D.C., U.S.
- Died: February 10, 1940 (aged 63)
- Occupations: Archivist; historian
- Spouse: Elizabeth V. Kelly (m. 1922; died 1933)
- Children: 1
- Parent(s): James Nicholas Fitzpatrick; Elizabeth Ann Combs

John Clement Fitzpatrick (August 10, 1876 – February 10, 1940) was an archivist and an early American historian, widely regarded as an authority on George Washington. He was noted for his groundbreaking work editing Washington's diaries and many letters and documents. Appointed by the George Washington Bicentennial Commission he prevailed over the editorship in his acclaimed 39 volume work, The Writings of George Washington, published between 1931 and 1944. His involvement during this prolonged effort set many of the standards for the management of manuscripts in the Library of Congress. Fitzpatrick died before all the volumes had been published. He belonged to a number of historical societies while also earning honorary degrees from several prominent universities. Fitzpatrick's years of correspondence and other records have provided historians with valuable sources of information on the life of and events surrounding George Washington, and on the history of Washington, D.C. for that era.

== Early life ==
Fitzpatrick was born in Washington, D.C. His father was James Nicholas Fitzpatrick who worked as a financial clerk for the U.S. Senate. His mother was Elizabeth Ann Combs. He graduated from Washington High School in 1894 and thereafter worked for three years as a journalist for the U.S. Government Daily Advertiser. He married Elizabeth V. Kelly, later in life in 1922, their marriage producing one daughter, Elizabeth Fitzpatrick Gerrety, born April 4th 1924. Fitzpatrick's wife died in 1933. Elizabeth inherited the Fitzpatrick estate including many of his letters and other writings, which she gave to the Library of Congress.

== Career ==
Before beginning his academic and historical career, Fitzpatrick worked as an auditor for the United States Senate and later for the Treasury Department. In 1897 he began working at the Library of Congress and was soon appointed by its Librarian John Russell Young, as an entry technician, the same year the Library of Congress created its Manuscripts Division. In 1902 he became the assistant chief of the division which grew under his direction to include one the greatest collections of source materials in the world. He had always recognized the importance of establishing the national archives department, serving for a while on the commission to evaluate its role and importance in the academic world.

Fitzpatrick was given the task of calendaring (an arduous process of indexing manuscripts) the George Washington papers. He finally completed the project in 1909. During this time he assumed greater responsibility for the Manuscripts Division. In 1908 Fitzpatrick was appointed the chief clerk, which placed him in charge of its administrative duties.

In 1918, still with his tenure at the Library, he edited The Autobiography of Martin Van Buren which he published in 1920. He also edited and published the documentary journals of the Continental Congress along, George Washington's diaries and in 1921 wrote, Notes on the care, cataloguing, calendaring and arranging of manuscripts, published by the Library of Congress. He remained chief clerk until his departure in 1928 to preside over the George Washington Bicentennial Commission, founded by Congress to celebrate the coming 200th anniversary in 1932 of George Washington's birth in 1731. His resignation was also prompted by being passed over to become chief of the newly formed Manuscripts Division in favor of historian John Franklin Jameson. Among the Commission's projects was the publication of the monumental Writings of Washington, which was compiled and edited over a twelve-year period by Fitzpatrick. Under his direction the commission conducted a thorough investigation of all available books, pamphlets, reports, and other material relating to the life and times of George Washington. Due to the wide-ranging field associated with Washington the commission was required to examine the requirements they would follow in the selection of material, while also making sure they didn't exclude any essential data. After being transcribed to print, edited and printed the individual volumes would in turn be published over a twelve-year period under the authority of Congress and the George Washington Bicentennial Commission. While working on the Washington's writings project Fitzpatrick was invited to speak about his involvement at a special meeting and celebration sponsored by the George Washington Bicentennial Commission on May 7, 1932.

Fitzpatrick received an MA from Mount St. Mary's College in 1918 and was awarded honorary degrees from George Washington University and Washington and Lee University in 1926 and 1932, respectively. His scholarly pursuits primarily involved the American Revolution, and ventured outside this realm only once to edit and publish the Autobiography of Martin Van Buren. History being his primary interest Fitzpatrick was a prominent member of the New York Historical Society, the American Irish Historical Society, and the American Academy of Political and Social Science. He was known to have a few ardent interests besides history, which included art and religion and he belonged to the American Artists Professional League. He was also president of the American Catholic Historical Society from 1928 to 1929, and a member of L'Institut Français de Washington, In 1928 he was accepted into the American Antiquarian Society, however he could rarely be persuaded to leave his work in Washington to participate in their meetings.

Fitzpatrick died at the relatively young age of 63 on February 10, 1940, while editing the 29th volume (of a 39-volume work) of The Writings of George Washington, taken from Washington's original manuscripts, letters, records and journals. Publishing the numerous individual volumes took several years. When Fitzpatrick died only twenty six of the volumes had been published while the remaining volumes were still in page proof and not yet ready for publication. Fitzpatrick is buried at the Congressional Cemetery in Washington DC.

=== Fitzpatrick papers ===
The papers of John Clement Fitzpatrick range from 1927 to 1941: They consist of general correspondence with a wide range of people, including New York Congressman Sol Bloom, director of the United States George Washington Bicentennial Commission, and lend themselves to a variety of Washington related topics. The bulk of his correspondence is dated between 1927 and 1941 and primarily relate to Fitzpatrick's undertakings while editor of his widely acclaimed, The Writings of George Washington from the Original Manuscript Sources, 1745–1799, prepared under the direction of the George Washington Bicentennial Commission. They include letters concerning the locations of original Washington documents which were to be published in his forthcoming 39-volume work, along with correspondence with the Government Printing Office relating to their printing. In 1932, the bicentennial of Washington's birth, interest in Washington's life was greatly renewed, prompting thousands of letters of inquiry into virtually every aspect of Washington's personal and professional life. Fitzpatrick's replies to these wide-ranging questions are a valuable source of information on Washington. His letters of reply provided information on Washington's appearance and his dental problems along with valuable information regarding Washington's birthday, birthplace, life mask, death, burial and grave sites, (Note: Washington's remains were moved from Mount Vernon to Washington DC) and provided information to inquiries about his education along with Washington's ideas about education, his library, service sword, bookplate, the family coat of arms and the genealogy of the Washington family. Fitzpatrick's papers were given to the Library of Congress shortly after his death by his sister, Katherine F. Rodgers, in 1940. Some of the papers were transferred from the Library of Congress Archives to the Manuscript Division in 1988. The Fitzpatrick Papers were arranged into five separate categories: The John C. Fitzpatrick Series, the 'Fitzpatrick and Combs Families Series', the 'Elizabeth F. Gerrety Series', a 'Photographs Series', along with the 'Oversized Series'. The series contains information covering the Fitzpatrick and Combs families offering historical insights to anyone with an interest in the history of Washington D.C. for the time period. Fitzpatrick was affectionately referred to by the Library of Congress staff as "Uncle Sam's authority on Washingtonia".

== Works by Fitzpatrick ==
=== The writings of George Washington ===
- Washington, George (1931) 'The writings of George Washington' were transcribed from the original manuscript sources, 1745–1799, in 39 volumes; There have been 63 printings published between 1931 and 2007.

Writings of George Washington, in 39 volumes, edited by John C. Fitzpatrick, et al
(Book titles link to respective eBooks)
- Washington, George (1931). Fitzpatrick, John Clement (ed.). The writings of George Washington from the original manuscript sources, 1745–1799. Vol. v.1. Washington, D.C.: U.S. Government Printing Office;prepared under the direction of the United States George Washington Bicentennial Commission and published by authority of Congress.Topics: Last will—Origin of Washington family—Years as Colonel—Marriage—History Revolution, 1775–1783 Sources
- —— (1933). Fitzpatrick, John Clement; Matteson, David Maydole (eds.). The writings of George Washington from the original manuscript sources, 1745–1799. Vol. v.2. New York & London: G. P. Putnam's Sons.
- —— (1933). Fitzpatrick, John Clement; Matteson, David Maydole (eds.). The writings of George Washington from the original manuscript sources, 1745–1799. Vol. v.3. Washington, D.C.: U.S. Government Printing Office.
- —— (1933). Fitzpatrick, John Clement (ed.). The writings of George Washington from the original manuscript sources, 1745–1799. Vol. v.4. Washington, D.C.: U.S. Government Printing Office. Topics:
- —— (1932). Fitzpatrick, John Clement; Matteson, David Maydole (eds.). The writings of George Washington from the original manuscript sources, 1745–1799. Vol. v.5. Washington, D.C.: U.S. Government Printing Office. Topics:
- —— (1833). Fitzpatrick, John Clement; Matteson, David Maydole (eds.). The writings of George Washington from the original manuscript sources, 1745–1799. Vol. v.6. Washington, D.C.: U.S. Government Printing Office. Topics:
- —— (1833). Fitzpatrick, John Clement; Matteson, David Maydole (eds.). The writings of George Washington from the original manuscript sources, 1745–1799. Vol. v.7. Washington, D.C.: U.S. Government Printing Office.
  Topics: Washington, George, 1732–1799, Washington family, United States—History Revolution, 1775–1783, United States—History Confederation, 1783–1789, United States—History Sources, United States—Politics and government Sources, United States—Politics and government 1775–1783, United States—Politics and government 1783–1789
- —— (1834). Fitzpatrick, John Clement (ed.). The writings of George Washington from the original manuscript sources, 1745–1799. Vol. v.8. Washington, D.C.: U.S. Government Printing Office.
  Topics:
- —— (1933). Fitzpatrick, John Clement (ed.). The writings of George Washington from the original manuscript sources, 1745–1799. Vol. v.9. Washington, D.C.: U.S. Government Printing Office.
  Topics: Letters to Generals Gates, Thomas Nelson, Greene, Putnam, Biddle, Hazelwood; Colonel Samuel Smith; Letters to President of Congress, Commander of the Virginia Militia, Governor Patrick Henry, Sir William Howe, etc.
- —— (1933). Fitzpatrick, John Clement (ed.). The writings of George Washington from the original manuscript sources, 1745–1799. Vol. v.10. Washington, D.C.: U.S. Government Printing Office.
  Topics:
- —— (1933). Fitzpatrick, John Clement; Matteson, David Maydole (eds.). The writings of George Washington from the original manuscript sources, 1745–1799. Vol. v.11. Washington, D.C.: U.S. Government Printing Office.
  Topics:
- —— (1934). Fitzpatrick, John Clement; Matteson, David Maydole (eds.). The writings of George Washington from the original manuscript sources, 1745–1799. Vol. v.12. Washington, D.C.: U.S. Government Printing Office.
  Topics:
- —— (1931). Fitzpatrick, John Clement; Matteson, David Maydole (eds.). The writings of George Washington from the original manuscript sources, 1745–1799. Vol. v.13. Washington, D.C.: U.S. Government Printing Office. – Topics: 1778 letters to Generals Gates, Sullivan and Greene, officers, statesmen and others.
- —— (1931). Fitzpatrick, John Clement; Matteson, David Maydole (eds.). The writings of George Washington from the original manuscript sources, 1745–1799. Vol. v.14. Washington, D.C.: U.S. Government Printing Office. – Topics: Washington family
- —— (1931). Fitzpatrick, John Clement; Matteson, David Maydole (eds.). The writings of George Washington from the original manuscript sources, 1745–1799. Vol. v.15. Washington, D.C.: U.S. Government Printing Office. – Topics:
- —— (1931). Fitzpatrick, John Clement; Matteson, David Maydole (eds.). The writings of George Washington from the original manuscript sources, 1745–1799. Vol. v.16. Washington, D.C.: U.S. Government Printing Office. – Topics: 1779 letters to Generals Sullivan Gates, Officers, President of Congress; 1779 General Orders.
- —— (1931). Fitzpatrick, John Clement; Matteson, David Maydole (eds.). The writings of George Washington from the original manuscript sources, 1745–1799. Vol. v.17. Washington, D.C.: U.S. Government Printing Office. – Topics: Letters 1779, to Generals Heath, Wayne; to the President of Congress, Board of War; to Governors Trumbull, Livingston; General Orders; etc.
- —— (1931). Fitzpatrick, John Clement; Matteson, David Maydole (eds.). The writings of George Washington from the original manuscript sources, 1745–1799. Vol. v.18. Washington, D.C.: U.S. Government Printing Office. – Topics: Letters to Officers, General Orders, February 10 to June 11, 1780
- —— (1931). Fitzpatrick, John Clement; Matteson, David Maydole (eds.). The writings of George Washington from the original manuscript sources, 1745–1799. Vol. v.19. Washington, D.C.: U.S. Government Printing Office.
- —— (1931). Fitzpatrick, John Clement; Matteson, David Maydole (eds.). The writings of George Washington from the original manuscript sources, 1745–1799. Vol. v.20. Washington, D.C.: U.S. Government Printing Office.
- —— (1931). Fitzpatrick, John Clement; Matteson, David Maydole (eds.). The writings of George Washington from the original manuscript sources, 1745–1799. Vol. v.21. Washington, D.C.: U.S. Government Printing Office. – Topics : General Orders & Letters, Dec.1780 – Apr.1781: Letters to – Generals, e.g.Greene, Heath, Howe; Numerous letters to Colonel Timothy Pickering; – to President of Congress, Gov. Clinton.
- —— (1931). Fitzpatrick, John Clement; Matteson, David Maydole (eds.). The writings of George Washington from the original manuscript sources, 1745–1799. Vol. v.22. Washington, D.C.: U.S. Government Printing Office.
- —— (1931). Fitzpatrick, John Clement; Matteson, David Maydole (eds.). The writings of George Washington from the original manuscript sources, 1745–1799. Vol. v.23. Washington, D.C.: U.S. Government Printing Office.
- —— (1931). Fitzpatrick, John Clement; Matteson, David Maydole (eds.). The writings of George Washington from the original manuscript sources, 1745–1799. Vol. v.24. Washington, D.C.: U.S. Government Printing Office.
- —— (1931). Fitzpatrick, John Clement; Matteson, David Maydole (eds.). The writings of George Washington from the original manuscript sources, 1745–1799. Vol. v.25. Washington, D.C.: U.S. Government Printing Office.
- —— (1931). Fitzpatrick, John Clement; Matteson, David Maydole (eds.). The writings of George Washington from the original manuscript sources, 1745–1799. Vol. v.26. Washington, D.C.: U.S. Government Printing Office.
- —— (1931). Fitzpatrick, John Clement; Matteson, David Maydole (eds.). The writings of George Washington from the original manuscript sources, 1745–1799. Vol. v.27. Washington, D.C.: U.S. Government Printing Office.
- —— (1931). Fitzpatrick, John Clement; Matteson, David Maydole (eds.). The writings of George Washington from the original manuscript sources, 1745–1799. Vol. v.28. Washington, D.C.: U.S. Government Printing Office.
- —— (1931). Fitzpatrick, John Clement; Matteson, David Maydole (eds.). The writings of George Washington from the original manuscript sources, 1745–1799. Vol. v.29. Washington, D.C.: U.S. Government Printing Office.
- —— (1931). Fitzpatrick, John Clement; Matteson, David Maydole (eds.). The writings of George Washington from the original manuscript sources, 1745–1799. Vol. v.30. Washington, D.C.: U.S. Government Printing Office.
- —— (1931). Fitzpatrick, John Clement; Matteson, David Maydole (eds.). The writings of George Washington from the original manuscript sources, 1745–1799. Vol. v.31. Washington, D.C.: U.S. Government Printing Office.
- —— (1931). Fitzpatrick, John Clement; Matteson, David Maydole (eds.). The writings of George Washington from the original manuscript sources, 1745–1799. Vol. v.32. Washington, D.C.: U.S. Government Printing Office.
- —— (1931). Fitzpatrick, John Clement; Matteson, David Maydole (eds.). The writings of George Washington from the original manuscript sources, 1745–1799. Vol. v.33. Washington, D.C.: U.S. Government Printing Office.
- —— (1931). Fitzpatrick, John Clement; Matteson, David Maydole (eds.). The writings of George Washington from the original manuscript sources, 1745–1799. Vol. v.34. Washington, D.C.: U.S. Government Printing Office.
- —— (1931). Fitzpatrick, John Clement; Matteson, David Maydole (eds.). The writings of George Washington from the original manuscript sources, 1745–1799. Vol. v.35. Washington, D.C.: U.S. Government Printing Office.
- —— (1931). Fitzpatrick, John Clement; Matteson, David Maydole (eds.). The writings of George Washington from the original manuscript sources, 1745–1799. Vol. v.36. Washington, D.C.: U.S. Government Printing Office. – Topics: 1797 letters. Numerous letters to Secretary of War and nephew Bushrod Washington; letters to Secretary of State, Attorney General, Hamilton, Lafayette, family members, etc.
- —— (1931). Fitzpatrick, John Clement; Matteson, David Maydole (eds.). The writings of George Washington from the original manuscript sources, 1745–1799. Vol. v.37. Washington, D.C.: U.S. Government Printing Office. – Topics: Numerous letters to Secretary of War; Letters to Secretary of State, Maj. Gen. Alexander Hamilton, Gov. Robert Dinwiddie, other statesmen, et al.
- —— (1931). Fitzpatrick, John Clement; Matteson, David Maydole (eds.). The writings of George Washington from the original manuscript sources, 1745–1799. Vol. v.38. Washington, D.C.: U.S. Government Printing Office. – General Index A – N
- —— (1931). Fitzpatrick, John Clement; Matteson, David Maydole (eds.). The writings of George Washington from the original manuscript sources, 1745–1799. Vol. v.39. Washington, D.C.: U.S. Government Printing Office. – General Index O – Z

See also: George Washington Bicentennial Commission publications for access to any given volume.

The diaries of Washington

- Washington, George (1925). Fitzpatrick, John Clement (ed.). The Diaries of George Washington, 1748–1799. Vol. 1. Houghton Mifflin.
- —— (1925). Fitzpatrick, John Clement (ed.). The Diaries of George Washington, 1748–1799. Vol. 2. Houghton Mifflin.
- —— (1925). Fitzpatrick, John Clement (ed.). The Diaries of George Washington, 1748–1799. Vol. 3. Houghton Mifflin.
- —— (1925). Fitzpatrick, John Clement (ed.). The Diaries of George Washington, 1748–1799. Vol. 4. Houghton Mifflin.

(18 editions published between 1925 and 2005)

Other writings

- The autobiography of Martin Van Buren by Martin Van Buren: 21 editions published between 1920 and 2010.
- Journals of the Continental Congress, 1774–1789 by United States: 12 editions published between 1909 and 2013.
- Calendar of the correspondence of George Washington, Commander in Chief of the Continental Army, with the Continental Congress by Library of Congress: 16 editions published between 1906 and 1970.
- The spirit of the revolution; new light from some of the original sources of American history by John Clement Fitzpatrick: 14 editions published between 1924 and 1970.
- Calendar of the correspondence of George Washington, commander in chief of the Continental Army, with the officers ... by Library of Congress: 28 editions published in 1915.
- October 21, 1779 – February 9, 1780 by George Washington: 209 editions published between 1756 and 1970.
- George Washington himself; a common-sense biography written from his manuscripts by John Clement Fitzpatrick: 13 editions published between 1933 and 1975.
- List of the Washington manuscripts from the year 1592 to 1775 by United States: 17 editions published in 1919.
- The last will and testament of George Washington and schedule of his property, to which is appended the last will and testament of Martha Washington by George Washington: 12 editions published between 1939 and 1992.
- Calendar of the papers of Franklin Pierce by Wilmer Ross Leech: 3 editions published in 1917.
- Check list of collections of personal papers in historical societies, university and public libraries and other learned institutions in the United States by Library of Congress: 4 editions published in 1918.
- List of the Vernon-Wager manuscripts in the Library of Congress by Library of Congress: 3 editions published in 1904.
- Some historic houses, their builders and their places in history by John Clement Fitzpatrick: 4 editions published between 1939 and 1940.
- George Washington, colonial traveller, 1732–1775 by George Washington: 3 editions published in 1927.
- Fitzpatrick, John Clement (1921). Notes on the care, cataloguing, calendaring and arranging of manuscripts. Library of Congress, Manuscript Division. (19 printings published between 1913 and 1934)
- George Washington's accounts of expenses while commander-in-chief of the Continental army, 1775–1783, reproduced in facsimile, with annotations by George Washington: 4 editions published in 1917.
- Journals of the Continental Congress by United States

== See also ==
- Worthington C. Ford – archivist of Washington and early American history
- William Wright Abbot – archivist who did extensive work editing and publishing papers of George Washington
- Howard Henry Peckham – prominent early American archivist
- Peter Force – mid 19th century archivist who amassed one of the biggest collections of documents on the American Revolution.
- Bibliography of George Washington
- Manuscript culture
- Archive and Archival research
- List of American historians
- The Washington Papers
- William L. Clements Library – holds one of the largest collections of rare books and manuscripts on early American history
- James Kendall Hosmer, writer, historian and librarian

== Sources ==
- Washington, Anne Madison (1932). History of the George Washington Bicentennial Commission. Vol. v.1. Washington D.C.: United States Congress: George Washington Bicentennial Commission.
- Gayle Thornbrough; Connie L. Cartledge; Joseph K. Brooks, eds. (2008). John Clement Fitzpatrick Papers (PDF). Manuscript Division, Library of Congress Washington, D.C.
- "Bloom, Sol". U.S. House of Representatives: Office of Art & Archives.
- Ferraro, William M. (2009). "The AHA and the George Washington Bicentennial in 1932". American Historical Association.
- Fitzpatrick, John Clement. American National Biography Online. 2000. ISBN 978-0-1986-0669-7.
- Cox, Richard J. (2000). Fitzpatrick, John Clement. Oxford University Press. doi:10.1093/anb/9780198606697.article.1400193.
- "Fitzpatrick, John Clement 1876–1940". OCLC Research Works; World Catalog Identities. 2010.
- "John Clement Fitzpatrick" (PDF). American Antiquarian Society, proceedings. 1940.
- "John C. Fitzpatrick Papers: Biographical/Historical note". Washington D.C.: Georgetown University Special Collections Research Center.
- "Uncle Sam's authority on Washingtonia". Library of Congress.
- The Writings of George Washington from the original manuscript source. HathiTrust Digital Library.
- Fitzpatrick, John Clement (1921). Notes on the care, cataloguing, calendaring and arranging of manuscripts. Library of Congress, Manuscript Division. (19 printings published between 1913 and 1934)
