= William Wright Abbot =

American archivist and historian

- Born: May 20, 1922; Louisville, Georgia, U.S.
- Died: August 31, 2009 (aged 87); Charlottesville, Virginia, U.S.
- Education: University of Georgia; Duke University; College of William & Mary
- Military career
- Allegiance: United States
- Branch: Navy
- Rank: Lieutenant junior grade.
- Conflicts: World War II

William Wright Abbot III (May 20, 1922 – August 31, 2009) was an American archivist and historian, widely noted for his work compiling and editing The Washington Papers. After his undergraduate study, he joined the U.S. Navy and served in the Pacific theater during World War II. He then earned advanced degrees and became a professor and historian. In undertaking the editing and publishing of the papers of George Washington, Abbot examined some 135,000 letters and documents from and to Washington. Abbot's career as a teacher and historian lasted nearly 50 years.

== Early years ==
Abbot was born in Louisville, Georgia, the son of William Wright Abbot II and Lillian Abbot. He attended Louisville Academy public high school and graduated in 1939. He soon enrolled in Davidson College and attended for two years. In 1941 he transferred to the University of Georgia and graduated in 1943. That year he was awarded the Baccalaureate degree just before joining the United States Navy. Abbot's career as a teacher began when he was assigned to teach celestial navigation to young naval cadets at Duke University in the spring of 1946; he studied under Charles Sydnor. That fall, he returned to his hometown to teach science and English grammar at his old high school. Abbot then went back to Duke University to study history under the GI Bill and earned his master's and doctorate degrees. He completed his PhD studies in 1953 and was hired by the College of William & Mary in Virginia as an assistant professor of history.

== Career ==
During World War II, Abbot served in small naval ships and saw service in the Pacific Ocean and Mediterranean and Adriatic seas. He later remarked that he had reached the height of his personal authority at age 22, when, while serving in the Pacific theater, he was in charge of SC-504, a 110-foot (34 m) submarine chaser. He served from 1943 to 1946, and rose to the rank of lieutenant junior grade.

Abbot was a history professor at the University of Virginia (UVA). In 1960–1961 he edited the university's publication Journal of Southern History. Abbot was the James Madison Professor of History and taught colonial history at the UVA. He became a longtime editor of Washington's correspondence and papers. The aim of his undertaking was to compile and publish a definitive collection of Washington's works. He worked on Washington's papers for more than 15 years, raising several million dollars in funding while reading or editing more than 135,000 of Washington's documents. His research into the Colonial period has been acclaimed for greatly expanding on the existing knowledge of the Continental government during its formative period.

== Works ==
The Papers of George Washington, Abbot's Washington papers project, has approximately 50 volumes and was expected to be completed in 2017 and expand to more than 80 volumes. The voluminous work is divided into five categories: the Colonial Series; the Revolutionary War Series; the Confederation Series; the Presidential Series; and the Retirement Series. It is estimated that there are some 135,000 pieces of correspondence from or addressed to Washington. (Note: Over the last 100 years some 150–200 forgeries of Washington's correspondence have been discovered.) This project differs from earlier attempts to chronicle and edit Washington's papers due to its greater depth of coverage. Abbot's comprehensive perspective project about the first president covers "both sides of the story", which also includes thousands of letters addressed to Washington, according to former project editor Dorothy Twohig. She further maintains that Abbot was very meticulous and went to great lengths to consult every possible document which provided detailed information, explaining the context of every letter and diary entry of Washington in his effort to help readers understand "why Washington took the measures that he did". Edward G. Lengel also was involved in the editing of the Washington papers.

Abbot's 1959 work, The Royal Governors of Georgia, is said to be unsurpassed and unchallenged in Georgia history. It is considered the leading authority on Governors Reynolds, Ellis and Wright and the most important work covering Georgia's history. For his effort, Abbot was awarded the John Macpherson Berrien Award (Note: John Macpherson Berrien (1781–1856) was a United States senator from Georgia and Andrew Jackson's Attorney General) by the Georgia Historical Society. (Note: See: Abbot, William W. (1959). The Royal Governors of Georgia, 1754–1775. Books on Demand. ISBN 9780807807583.)

Abbot also wrote The Colonial Origins of the United States, 1607–1763, published in 1975. (Note: See: —— (1975). The Colonial Origins of the United States, 1607–1763. Wiley Publishers. ISBN 9780471001393.)

== Death ==
Abbot died of congestive heart failure on August 31, 2009, in a hospital in Charlottesville, Virginia, at the age of 87. He is buried in Louisville City Cemetery in Louisville, Georgia.

== See also ==
- John C. Fitzpatrick, Worthington C. Ford, Benson John Lossing, and Archer Butler Hulbert — Washington archivists and early American historians
- Bibliography of George Washington
- Colonial government in the Thirteen Colonies
- Manuscript culture
- William L. Clements Library – holds one of the largest collections of rare books and manuscripts on early American history
- James Kendall Hosmer, writer, historian and librarian

== Sources ==
- Deaton, Stan (2009). "In Memoriam William Wright Abbot III, 1922–2009". The Georgia Historical Quarterly. 93 (4). The Georgia Historical Quarterly, Georgia Historical Society: 477–478. JSTOR 27809152.
- Shapiro, T. Rees (September 9, 2009). "W.W. Abbot, 87; U-Va. Professor, Editor Opened Window Into 1st President's Mind". Washington Post.
- "William Wright Abbot, III of Charlottesville". Hill & Wood Funeral Service. 2009.
- Twohig, Dorothy (1983). "George Washington Forgeries and Facsimile". Provenance: The Journal of the Society of Georgia Archivists. 1 (Spring, 1983): 1–13.
- Abbot, William W. (2018). "Abbot, W. W., The Papers of George Washington". The University of Virginia Press. Archived from the original on August 20, 2018.
