= Archer Butler Hulbert =

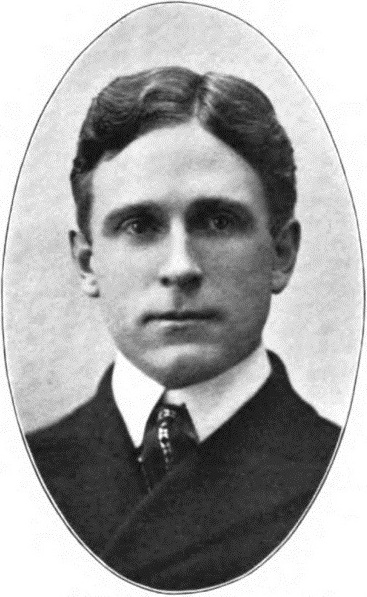
- Born: January 26, 1873; Bennington, Vermont
- Died: December 24, 1933 (aged 60)
- Occupation(s): Historian, Geographer
- Spouse(s): (1) Mary Elizabeth Stacy; (2) Dorothy Printup

Archer Butler Hulbert, FRGS (Jan 26, 1873 – December 24, 1933), historical geographer, writer, and professor of American history, son of Rev. Calvin Butler Hulbert and Mary Elizabeth Woodward, was born in Bennington, Vermont. His father later became President of Middlebury College. Hulbert was married twice. On September 10, 1901 he married Mary Elizabeth Stacy, who died in 1920. On June 16, 1923 he married Dorothy Printup. He had two daughters by each wife.

Hulbert graduated from Marietta College, Marietta, Ohio, in 1895. Hulbert also received an honorary MA in 1904 and was awarded an LHD in 1930. He received a Litt.D. from Middlebury in 1929.

He was Vice-Principal of the Putnam Military Academy, Zanesville, Ohio, until 1897. Hulbert then did newspaper work in Korea from 1897 to 1898: he was editor of the Korean Independent (Seoul) and edited Far East American newspapers. His brother, Homer Hulbert, had gone there in 1886. He was Professor of American History at Marietta College 1904-18. After Marietta College, Hulbert became a lecturer in American history at Clark University from 1918 to 1919. He also was a lecturer at the University of Chicago in 1904 and 1923; and he served as archivist for the Harvard Commission on Western History (1912–16). Hulbert's last position was at Colorado College, from 1920 until his death. After his death, his wife, Dorothy Printup Hulbert, continued his work.

Hulbert's interest in trails dated from fishing trips taken during his college, when he noticed Indian trails. This interest led at first to his 16 volumes of Historic Highways of America (1902–05).

The 1929 Bibliography of Archer Butler Hulbert lists 102 volumes. His work Forty Niners (1931) won a $5,000 prize from The Atlantic Monthly magazine.

== Works ==
- The old National Road a chapter of American expansion (1901)
- Washington and the West (1905)
- The Ohio River; a course of empire (1906)
- The Niagara River (1908)
- The paths of inland commerce; a chronicle of trail, road, and waterway (1920)
- Frontiers, the genius of American nationality (1929)
- Soil : its influence on the history of the United States: with special reference to migration and the scientific study of local history (1930)
- Forty-niners : the chronicle of the California trail (1931)
- Where rolls the Oregon; prophet and pessimist look Northwest;edited with bibliographical resume 1825-1830 (1933)
- Southwest on the turquoise trail; the first diaries on the road to Santa Fe (1933)

=== Historic Highways of America, 16 vols. (1902–1905) ===
- 1. Paths of the Mound-Building Indians and Great Game Animals (1902)
- 2. Indian Thoroughfares (1902)
- 3. Washington's Road (Nemacolin's Path): The First Chapter of the Old French War (1903)
- 4. Braddock's Road and Three Relative Papers (1903)
- 5. The Old Glade (Forbes's) Road (Pennsylvania State Road) (1903)
- 6. Boone's Wilderness Road (1903)
- 7. Portage Paths: The Keys to the Continent (1903)
- 8. Military Roads of the Mississippi Basin: The Conquest of the Old Northwest (1904)
- 9. Waterways of Westward Expansion: The Ohio River and Its Tributaries (1903)
- 10. The Cumberland Road (1904)
- 11. Pioneer roads and experiences of travelers (Volume I) (1904)
- 12. Pioneer roads and experiences of travelers (Volume II) (1904)
- 13. The Great American Canals. Volume I. The Chesapeake and Ohio Canal and The Pennsylvania Canal (1904)
- 14. The Great American Canals. Volume II. The Erie Canal (1904)
- 15. The Future of Road-making in America. A Symposium by Archer Butler Hulbert and others (1905)
- 16. Index (1905)

== See also ==
- William Wright Abbot
