= "The Only Unavoidable Subject of Regret" =

2019 non-fiction book by Mary V. Thompson

"The Only Unavoidable Subject of Regret": George Washington, Slavery and the Enslaved Community at Mount Vernon
- First edition
- Author: Mary V. Thompson
- Language: English
- Genre: History
- Publisher: University of Virginia Press
- Publication date: 2019
- Pages: 502
- ISBN: 0813941849
- OCLC: 1035366283

The unfortunate condition of the persons, whose labour in part I employed, has been the only unavoidable subject of regret. To make the Adults among them as easy & as comfortable in their circumstances as their actual state of ignorance & improvidence would admit; & to lay a foundation to prepare the rising generation for a destiny different from that in which they were born; afforded some satisfaction to my mind, & could not I hoped be displeasing to the justice of the Creator.

— Statement attributed to George Washington that appears in the notebook of David Humphreys, c.1788/1789

"The Only Unavoidable Subject of Regret": George Washington, Slavery and the Enslaved Community at Mount Vernon is a scholarly book on the history of slavery at Mount Vernon during the times of George Washington. Written by Mary V. Thompson, the book was published in the United States in 2019.

== Background ==
Thompson stated that she had worked on the book for "about thirty years, although for a lot of that time, it didn't know that it wanted to be a book."

== Topics covered ==
Thompson's book contains major chapters that focus on topics that include George Washington and Martha Washington as slave owners; George Washington's changes in views about slavery over time; supervisors of slaves who were hired, indentured, or enslaved; family life in Mount Vernon's slave community; the slaves' quarters; the slaves' diets; slaves' recreation and private enterprise; and control and resistance and among Mount Vernon's slaves.

== Reviews and influence ==
Reviews have appeared in the London Review of Books, the Journal of Social History, the Washington Independent Review of Books, The Virginia Magazine of History and Biography, the Journal of the American Revolution, and Choice.

In the London Review of Books, Eric Foner wrote that

virtually all the information Thompson draws on comes from whites; as she ruefully notes, "only occasionally can the voice of one of the slaves be heard." Nonetheless, her command of the sources makes possible an almost encyclopedic description of the conditions of slave life. What did slaves eat? ... What clothing did Washington provide? ... On the much debated question of whether African elements survived in slave culture, Thompson acknowledges that the evidence is scanty but cautiously suggests that some naming practices, religious beliefs and methods of food preparation reflect an African inheritance....

In the Washington Independent Review of Books, Henry Wiencek wrote that

Drawing upon decades of research and writings as staff historian at Mount Vernon, Mary V. Thompson has, in "The Only Unavoidable Subject of Regret", produced a superb, moving portrait of the plantation's enslaved community. Thompson's admiration for George and Martha Washington is strong, but her focus is on the enslaved, whose stories she tells vividly and without sentimentality.

== Editions ==
The book was published in 2019 by University of Virginia Press:

- Thompson, Mary V. (2019). "The only unavoidable subject of regret": George Washington, slavery, and the enslaved community at Mount Vernon. Charlottesville, VA: University of Virginia Press. ISBN 978-0-8139-4184-4. OCLC 1035366283.
