= Ferdinand Schmidt (author) =

German writer and educator (1816–1890)

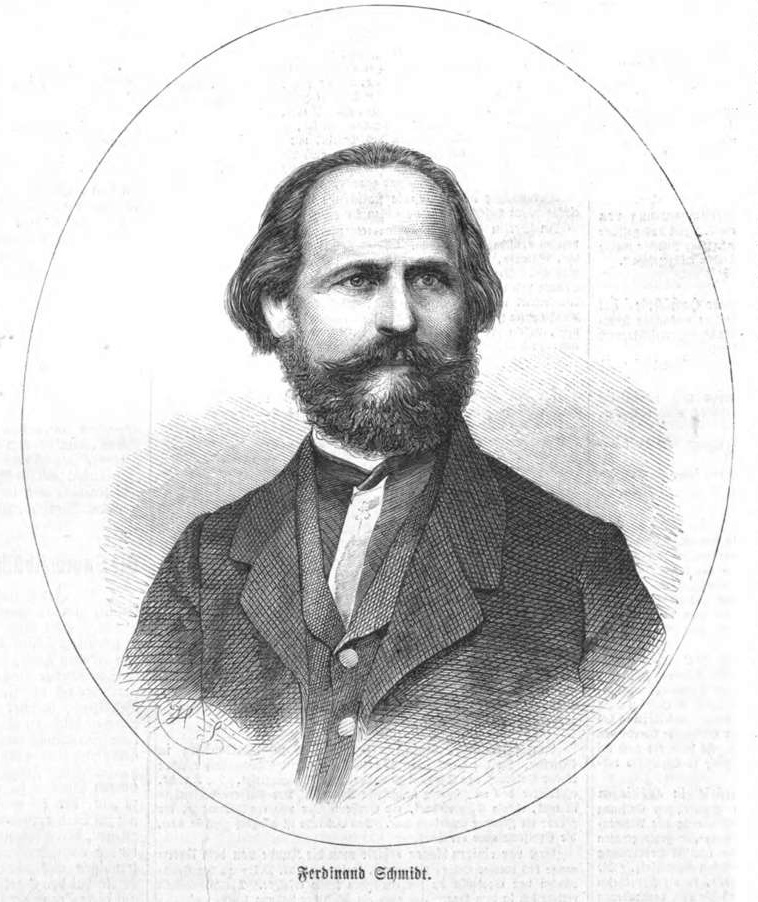
- Ferdinand Schmidt, 1870 (illustration by Hermann Scherenberg)
- Born: 2 October 1816; Frankfurt an der Oder, Kingdom of Prussia
- Died: 30 July 1890 (aged 73); Berlin, German Empire
- Burial place: St. Elisabeth's cemetery, Ackerstrasse, Berlin
- Occupation: Writer • educator
- Years active: 1837–1882

Ferdinand Schmidt (2 October 1816 – 30 July 1890) was a German writer and educator. Several of his works were translated into English by George Putnam Upton.

== Background ==
Schmidt was born in Frankfurt an der Oder and spent his youth in Neuzelle where his father held the post of corn clerk. At the age of 15 he became a private tutor at a forest ranger's farm near Neuzelle. When his father died in 1834, he first had to return to his parents' house, then attended the teachers' college in Neuzelle to train to be a teacher. He was employed in the Berlin community school service in 1837 and taught at the school for the poor.

Schmidt published an appeal in the Berlin magazine Die Biene asking for book donations for a public library, whereupon he was given 218 volumes. Since 1845 Schmidt emerged with numerous popular and youth publications, first in the journal Die Biene and then in the German Youth Library, which were intended to raise the level of education of the lower classes, but also to increase their national feeling. In 1846 he founded the association for the benefit of the working classes in Berlin after a meeting in the Tivoli on Kreuzberg (Viktoria-Quartier). He published textbooks for school lessons and a book on Prussian history. When he was to be promoted to main teacher because of his services, the responsible provincial school council set the condition that Schmidt was no longer allowed to publish. Schmidt refused and remained a simple teacher.

Ferdinand Schmidt died in Berlin in 1890 at the age of 73. He was buried in the local St. Elisabeth's cemetery on Ackerstrasse. The grave has not been preserved.

== Selected works ==
as author:

- Preußische Vaterlandskunde für Schule und Haus. Breslau 1846.
- Schiller. Ein Lebensbild für Jung und Alt. Neufeld & Henius, Berlin 1859.
- Oswin oder die Schule des Lebens. eine Erzählung. 3rd edn. Voigtländer Verlag, Kreuznach 1882.
- Der dreißigjährige Krieg. Berlin 1864 (2 vols).
- Leitfaden der Brandenburg-Preussischen Geschichte. Verlag Friedberg & Moser, Berlin 1865.
- Alexander von Humboldt. Ein Lebensbild für Jung und Alt. Berlin 1869.
- Oranienburg und Fehrbellin. Ein historisches Gemälde aus der Regierungszeit des Großen Kurfürsten. 9th edn., Berlin S.W., Verlag von Neufeld & Henius

as editor:

- Die schönsten Märchen, Legenden und Sagen des deutschen Volkes. Für Schule und Haus gesammelt aus den Werken unserer vorzüglichsten Dichter. Krüger Verlag, Berlin 1851.
- Homer's Odyssee. 14. Aufl. Oehmigke Verlag, Berlin 1855.
- Homer's Iliade. Der trojanische Krieg. Verlag Mohr, Berlin 1857.
- Götter und Helden. Erzählungen aus der griechischen Vorzeit. Berlin 1857.
- Preußens Geschichte in Wort und Bild. Ein Hausbuch für alle. Berlin 1864/74 (2 vols).

translated:

- Gudrun (1906)
- The Frithiof Saga (1910)
- George Washington (1911)
