= Worthington C. Ford =

American historian, archivist and editor

Worthington Chauncey Ford
- Born: February 15, 1858; Brooklyn, New York
- Died: March 7, 1941 (aged 83); Atlantic Ocean
- Occupations: Historian and librarian

Worthington Chauncey Ford (February 15, 1858 – March 7, 1941) was an American historian, archivist and editor of many collections of documents from early American history. He served in a variety of government positions: first, as the chief of the Bureau of Statistics for the U.S. Department of State, from 1885 to 1889, then at the U.S. Department of Treasury, 1893–1898, then as chief of the manuscripts division at the Library of Congress from 1902–1908. From 1909 to 1929 Ford was the editor of publications of the Massachusetts Historical Society, which had elected him a member in 1900. He also served concurrently as Librarian of the John Carter Brown Library at Brown University from 1917 to 1922.

== Family notoriety ==
Ford was a member of a distinguished and notorious family. He was the great-grandson (through his mother) of Noah Webster. His two younger brothers were Paul Leicester Ford, an eminent biographer and novelist, and Malcolm Webster Ford, a distinguished amateur athlete. Both died May 8, 1902, in a murder-suicide when Malcolm shot Paul and then himself.

== Historian ==
Ford studied at Brooklyn Polytechnic Institute before enrolling at Columbia University with the class of 1879, where he studied economics and history before dropping out his third year due to deafness. He worked for two years at the New York Herald before heading the federal Bureau of Statistics.

Ford was best known for his edited collections of a number of Founding Fathers documents, including The writings of George Washington (14 Volumes), Alexander Hamilton's notes in the Federal convention of 1787, and Writings of John Quincy Adams. He also edited collections of the correspondence of Thomas Jefferson, John Adams, and other figures in early American history.

Ford's historical work was also notable for his tenure as chief of the newly established Manuscripts Division at the Library of Congress. During his time in charge, from 1903 to 1909, he organized a significant effort to photograph and copy manuscripts pertaining to early American history which resided in foreign archives (especially France, Britain, and Spain). In this way, copies of many documents which had been missing since 1812 or earlier were recovered. In addition, he edited and published the complete Journals of the Continental Congress, 1774–1789.

Ford was elected a member of the American Antiquarian Society in 1907 and the American Philosophical Society in 1922.

Ford was active in the American Historical Association and was elected President in 1917. Ford's presidential address, The Editorial Function in United States History, is notable for its careful exposure of the deliberate omissions made by early editors of the Founding Fathers papers, including faked memoirs, papers edited to hide controversies important at the time, and other "crimes and errors" common in the editing and publishing of historical documents of the time.

Ford defended the American purchase and annexation of the Philippines from Spain during the Philippine–American War by saying "Questions of Conscience need not trouble us.... Here are rich lands, held by those who do not or cannot get the best out of them, and awaiting the fructifying application of capital and organization in commerce. Under this beneficent view the natives, an inferior race, must get out or become laborers. The Filipino is an incumbrance to be got rid of, unless he accepts the mandates of a purchasing and conquering power."

Ford also edited collections of works of other American figures, including Letters of Henry Adams (1892–1918), and a collection of Aaron Burr's letters.

== Personal life ==
Ford married Bettina Fillmore Quin in 1899, and they had two daughters. He died on March 7, 1941 while returning from Europe on the steamship Excalibur.

== See also ==
Other notable American historians who edited and published Washington's papers:

- William Wright Abbot
- John Clement Fitzpatrick
- James Kendall Hosmer, writer, historian and librarian
