= James Kendall Hosmer =

American writer, academic and librarian

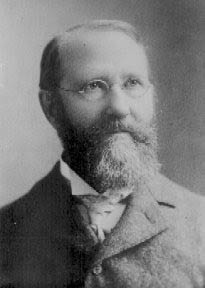
- Hosmer, c. 1921

President of the American Library Association
- In office 1902–1903
- Preceded by: John Shaw Billings
- Succeeded by: Herbert Putnam

Personal details
- Born: January 29, 1834 Northfield, Massachusetts, U.S.
- Died: May 11, 1927 (aged 93) Minneapolis, Minnesota, U.S.
- Resting place: Lakewood Cemetery
- Spouses: Eliza A. Cutler; Jenny P. Garland
- Parent: George Washington Hosmer (father)
- Education: Harvard University
- Occupation: Librarian; pastor
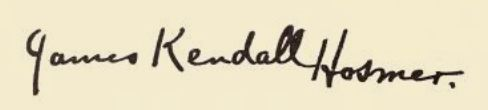
- Signature

Military service
- Allegiance: United States
- Branch/service: Union Army
- Unit: 52nd Regiment of Massachusetts Volunteers
- Battles/wars: American Civil War

James Kendall Hosmer (January 29, 1834 – May 11, 1927) was an American librarian and soldier who served in the Union Army during the American Civil War. He was also a pastor, library director, historian, author, and professor of history and literature. (Note: Biographical accounts on Hosmer are brief and somewhat scarce. Insights into the finer points of Hosmer's life, war time experiences, views on war and other issues, however, are revealed in several of his published works.) Members of the Hosmer family fought in the French and Indian War, American Revolution and the Civil War. As a pastor of the First Church in Deerfield, Massachusetts he left the ministry, feeling duty bound to join the U.S. Army to serve in the Civil War, insisting to serve at the front, where he participated in several major campaigns. As an author and historian he later wrote and published several works about and involving the Civil War and how he viewed the cause of both the North and South. He also authored a number of other works relating to early American history, along with several novels and a fair number of poems. Hosmer also reviewed and published accounts about the Lewis and Clark Expedition at a time when full accounts of the expedition were very few in number and out of print. During his career he corresponded with many prominent writers and historians involving his works. In his latter life he held several prominent positions in various literary associations, including his position as president of the American Library Association.

== Family ==
Hosmer was born in Northfield, Massachusetts, and was the son of Unitarian clergyman George Washington Hosmer from Canton, Massachusetts, Hanna P. (Kendall). He was the brother of William Rufus Hosmer, George Herbert Hosmer, Anna Hosmer, Ella Hosmer and Edward Jarvis Hosmer, a first sergeant with whom he served in the Union Army. Before the American Revolutionary War Hosmer's great-grandfather was a member of the Massachusetts Senate, when Samuel Adams was presiding officer. During the Revolution his great-grandfather held an important command position in the Massachusetts militia at Concord Bridge, during the Battles of Lexington and Concord. James married his first wife, Eliza A. Cutler, in 1863. After her death in 1877, Hosmer married Jenny P. Garland on November 27, 1878. The Hosmer family can trace their roots back to a small community of Ticehurst, in the county of Sussex, England, in the sixteenth century

== Education ==
Hosmer was ordained a minister in 1861, and, like his father, became the pastor for the Unitarian congregation in Deerfield, Massachusetts. Feeling bound by duty he later left the ministry and joined the Union Army to serve in the American Civil War. Hosmer received a Bachelor of Arts and graduated from Harvard University in 1855. He remained in Cambridge four years after his graduation and studied theology. He obtained an Honorary Doctor of Philosophy from the University of Missouri in 1877. He also received a Doctor of Law from Washington University in 1897. Hosmer, as a professor of English and history, taught at the University of Missouri, 1872–1874. From 1874–1892 he was a professor of English and German literature at Washington University. During his tenure there he wrote a definitive work on German literature. From 1892 to 1904 he was the director and Librarian Emeritus at the Minneapolis Public Library.

== Civil War ==
During the American Civil War, Hosmer enlisted as a private in the 52nd Regiment of Massachusetts Volunteers, 19th Army Corps. In little time he was promoted to the rank of corporal as a color guard, whose duty was to guard the regimental colors and national flag, especially during times of conflict. He was soon serving under Major General Nathaniel P. Banks. (Note: General Banks was also a native and a former governor of Massachusetts) Of the North's involvement in the war, Hosmer maintained that, "The cause of the North, briefly, is, to me, the cause of civilization and liberty." Because of his profession and literary ability, Hosmer was offered a safe post on the staff of General Banks, but he declined the offer, preferring to serve in the forefront of the battlefield.

Hosmer was present during the Red River campaign and the Siege of Port Hudson. While waiting to be deployed at the Siege he volunteered his medical skills treating the wounded at the army hospital for a week's duration. During the actual siege he witnessed black troops (Note: members of the 3rd Louisiana Native Guards, under General Butler's command) fighting for the first time among white troops and the praise that was given them, especially to the wounded, for their sacrifice. Throughout his term of service he wrote and prepared notes and letters, in the form of a diary, chronicling his experiences and observations, many involving Major-General Banks. Hosmer also refers to General Ulysses S. Grant several times in his writings. He made his first entry on November 23, 1862. At the time he had no intention of publishing them later, committing that effort explicitly for the interest of his father and family and various close friends, which they eventually would receive. Hosmer's service in the Union Army ended when his regiment was mustered out in 1863. At the urging of friends and relatives these accounts were organized and edited and were later published in a book in 1864, entitled, The Color Guard, being a corporal's notes of military service in the Nineteenth Army Corps, which outlined Hosmer's experiences during the war. His work received good reviews from many well known literary critics of the time and was widely read in both America and England. After the war he had acquired what he felt were some unorthodox ideas and subsequently felt himself unsuited for the ministry and decided to seek other occupations.

== Post war ==
Hosmer's first post-war occupation involved his professorship at Antioch College 1866–1872. From 1872 to 1874, he occupied the chair of English and German literature at the University of Missouri, and in 1874 was elected to a similar professorship in Washington University in St. Louis. He left his professorship in Missouri to direct the Minneapolis Public Library 1892–1904. From 1902 to 1903 Hosmer was the president of the American Library Association, and a fellow member of the American Academy of Arts and Sciences.

== Later life and literary efforts ==
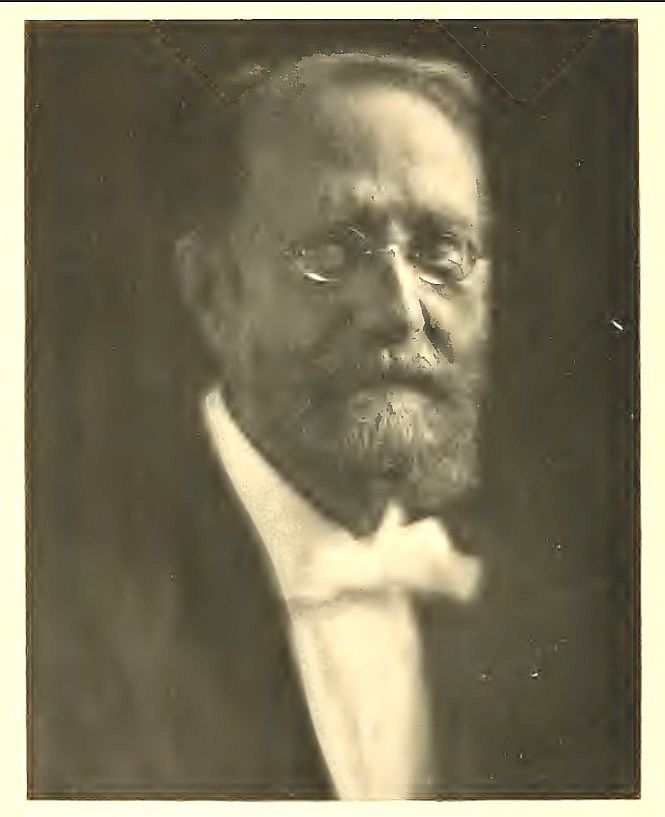
James Kendall Hosmer in 1912

After the Civil War Hosmer collected his diary and writings and wrote his first work, entitled the Color Guard, published in 1864, about the Civil War and his personal experiences therein. The book was highly acclaimed and received good reviews. The Boston Daily Advertiser said Hosmer's work "is written in a delightfully graphic epistolary style, and is really one of the most sterling books that the war has called into existence." The New York Evening Post said, "The prevailing tone of the book, however, is cheerful, hopeful, candid, and altogether Christian. It is most heartily to be commended." More than forty years after the Civil War had ended Hosmer authored several works about that war. In 1907, he published The Appeal to Arms, 1861-1863. In this work he defines his views of the north and south believing, "on either side was honest conviction of the justice of its cause; on either side great ability and manly endurance marked the struggle to the end. No preceding war had called forth higher devotedness or chivalry ... and heroism." In 1913, Hosmer authored and published his two volume work, The American Civil War. Though he had served on the Union side, and believed in its cause, his intentions were to present an impartial view as to the causes and dynamics of that war. In the author's preface Hosmer writes, "The author of this history helped as he could to "uphold the cause of the Union during the American Civil War, with both ballot and bayonet. Now, the passage of time has brought the impartial view of the conflict which is essential for true history."

In the early twentieth century Hosmer recognized that the then existing accounts of the Lewis and Clark Expedition of 1803 were scarce, while the fragmentary accounts had become scattered and were difficult to locate. Nicholas Biddle, who had helped and organized the expedition, upon their return from their expedition in 1806, assembled and edited Lewis and Clark's reports and log book for publication in 1814. (See listing in Further reading) In 1893 Doctor Elliott Coues published an account of the expedition based on Biddle's 1814 publication but it became very scarce and out of print. Hosmer, familiar in the affairs of Western history, undertook the task of supervising the reprinting of the complete work of 1814 and added a table of contents, comprehensive nineteen page introduction, and an analytic index.

Though much of Hosmer's time was committed to working as a college professor and librarian, he still managed to devote considerable time for his writing. His articles and stories were often featured in magazines and newspapers. Hosmer's reputation as a scholar was greatly advanced upon completion of his third book, A Short History of German Literature, published in 1878, which has been widely read by students of German. His next work was The Story of the Jews, published in 1885, which proved to be a comprehensive and sympathetic account of the history of the Jewish people. Thereafter he produced three biographies, Samuel Adams, 1885, The Life of Young Sir Henry Vane 1888, and The Life of Thomas Hutchinson, 1896. (Note: Samuel Adams was considered one of the principal provocateurs of the Revolution. Hutchinson was a prominent Loyalist politician in the Massachusetts Bay Colony in the years before the American Revolution. Vane was a Colonial Governor.) Historian Dumas Malone maintains that these accounts were published at a time when impartiality and restraint involving the American Revolution were not common among many historians and biographers, and Hosmer's works were noted for those qualities.

During his career Hosmer corresponded with a variety of prominent literary men and educators of the late 19th century, including Ralph Waldo Emerson, Henry Adams, George Bancroft, Charles Eliot Norton, Oliver Wendell Holmes, (Note: Not to be confused with his father, Oliver Wendell Holmes Sr.) Edward Everett Hale, and John Fiske. The Hosmer papers are housed at the Minnesota Historical Society, in two boxes, which contain Hosmer's two-volume autobiography, a variety of letters, critical commentary on a variety of books authored by Hosmer and others, comments on contemporary events in England and America, poems and information on Hosmer's career as a librarian.

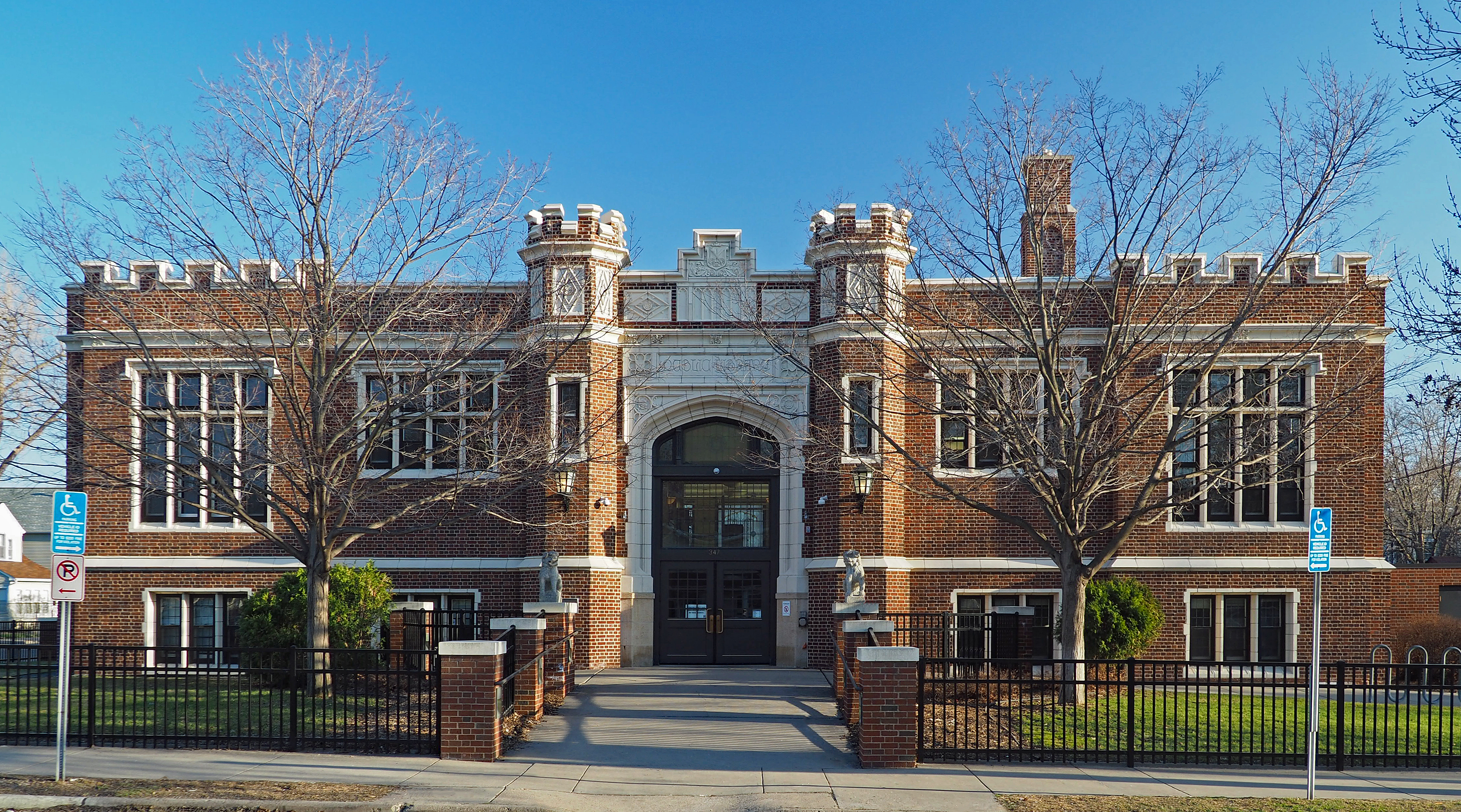
The Hosmer Library

When Hosmer retired from the Minneapolis Public Library it held the largest per capita number of works over any public library in a city over 200,000. The 36th Street Branch of the Minneapolis Public Library was renamed the James K. Hosmer Library in 1926, (Note: The library was built in 1916.) the year before Hosmer died. The James K. Hosmer Special Collections Library of the Hennepin County Library, the source of the photo above, is also named in his honor. In the final years of Hosmer's life he wrote an extensive two volume auto-biography, which is housed at the Minnesota Historical Society. Hosmer died at the age of 93 and his ashes were scattered in Cemetery Pond (also known as Jo Pond) at Lakewood Cemetery, Minneapolis, Hennepin County, Minnesota.

== Literary works ==
- Hosmer, James Kendall (1864). The Color-Guard; being a corporal's notes of military service in the Nineteenth Army Corps. Boston, Walker, Wise and Company.
- —— (1865). The Thinking Bayonet, a Novel. Boston: Walker, Fuller.
- —— (1879). A short history of German literature. Saint Louis, Missouri : American school book co.
- —— (1885). Life of Samuel Adams ("American Statesmen" series, Boston)
- —— (1889). The story of the Jews, ancient, mediaeval and modern. New York, Putnam.
- —— (1888). The Life of Young Sir Henry Vane, Governor of Massachusetts Bay. New York, Harper.
- —— (1894). How Thankful Was Bewitched. Putnam. ISBN 9781404731851.
- —— (1890). A Short History of Anglo-Saxon Freedom: The Polity of the English-speaking Race. New York : Charles Scribner's Sons.
- —— (1896). The life of Thomas Hutchinson, royal governor of the province of Massachusetts Bay. Boston New York, Houghton, Mifflin and company.
- —— (1901). A short history of the Mississippi valley. Boston and New York, Houghton, Mifflin and company.
- —— (1902). The history of the Louisiana purchase. New York, D. Appleton and Company.
- —— (1907). Outcome of the Civil war, 1863-1865. New York, Harper. Upgrade source listing
- —— (1912). The last leaf; observations, during seventy-five years, of men and events in America and Europe. New York, London, G. P. Putnam's Sons.
- —— (1913). The appeal to arms, 1861-1863. New York, Harper.
- —— (1913). The American Civil War. Vol. I. Harper & brothers.
- —— (1913). The American Civil War. Vol. II. Harper & brothers.

Edited works

- Lewis, Meriwether; Clark, William (1917). Hosmer, James Kendall (ed.). History of the expedition of Captains Lewis and Clark, 1804-5-6. Vol. I. Chicago : A.C. McClurg.
- Lewis, Meriwether; Clark, William (1917). Hosmer, James Kendall (ed.). History of the expedition of Captains Lewis and Clark, 1804-5-6. Vol. II. Chicago : A.C. McClurg.
- Winthrop, John (1908). Hosmer, James Kendall (ed.). Winthrop's journal, "History of New England" : 1630-1649. Vol. I. New York : Charles Scribner's Sons.
- Winthrop, John (1908). Hosmer, James Kendall (ed.). Winthrop's journal, "History of New England" : 1630-1649. Vol. II. New York : Charles Scribner's Sons.

== See also ==
- Thomas Perkins Abernethy - specialized in frontier history, and a contemporary of Charles Ambler
- William L. Clements Library
- Charles Henry Ambler - American historian, professor
- William L. Clements - Archivist and founder and donor to the William L. Clements Library

== Bibliography ==
- "The Color of Bravery: United States Colored Troops in the Civil War". The Civil War Trust. 2021.
- Hosmer, James Kendall (1864). The Color Guard. Boston, Walker, Wise.
- —— (1907). The appeal to arms, 1861-1863. New York and London, Harper & Brothers.
- —— (1907). Outcome of the Civil war, 1863-1865. New York, London, Harper & Bros.
- —— (1913). The American Civil War. Vol. I. Harper & brothers.
- —— (1913). The American Civil War. Vol. II. Harper & brothers.
- ——; Clark, William (1917). History of the expedition of Captains Lewis and Clark, 1804-5-6. Vol. I. Chicago : A.C. McClurg.
- Holzman, Robert S. (1957). "Ben Butler in the Civil War". The New England Quarterly. 30 (3). The New England Quarterly, Inc.: 330–345. doi:10.2307/362990. JSTOR 362990.
- Grace Lee Nute; Gertrude W. Ackermann, eds. (1935). Guide to the Personal papers in the Manuscript Collections of the Minnesota Historical Society. Saint Paul, Minnesote Historical Society.
- Leonard, John William; Nelson Marquis, Albert (1899). Who's who in America. Vol. 1. A.N. Marquis. — Hosmer entry on P. 351
- Malone, Dumas (1932). Dictionary Of American Biography. Vol. IX. Oxford University Press / New York, Charles Scribner & Sons.
- Roberts, Ronald Longaker (1987). The Hosmer Heritage. Vol. I. Roberts, publisher.
- Vance-Shaw, Mary F.; Whatley, Thomas E. Jr. (2006). Hosmer Heritage 1545-2006. Published by: Mary F. Vance-Shaw and Thomas E. Whatley, Jr.
- Wiegand, Wayne A. (1990). Dictionary of American Library Biography. Vol. I. Libraries Unlimited. ISBN 978-0-8728-7586-9.
- Wilson, James Grant; Fiske, John (1887–1900). Appletons' Cyclopaedia of American Biography, Grinnell-Lockwood. Vol. III. New York D. Appleton.
- "JAMES K. HOSMER: An Inventory of His Papers at the Minnesota Historical Society". Minnesota Historical Society. 2021.

Non-profit organization positions
Preceded by John Shaw Billings	President of the American Library Association; 1902–1903	Succeeded by Herbert Putnam
