= John Fiske =

John Fiske may refer to:

- John Fiske (philosopher) (1842–1901), American philosopher and historian
- John Fiske (media scholar) (1939–2021), author and Professor Emeritus at the University Wisconsin-Madison
- John Safford Fiske (1838–1907), U.S. diplomat involved in a sex scandal

== See also ==
- Jack Fisk (born 1945), American movie professional
- John Fisk (died 2004), American radio personality
- Jonathan Fisk (1778–1832), American lawyer and politician from New York
