= University of Michigan Museum of Natural History =

Natural history museum in Michigan, United States

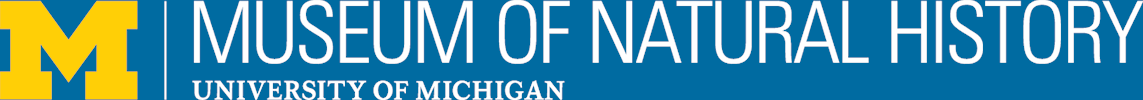

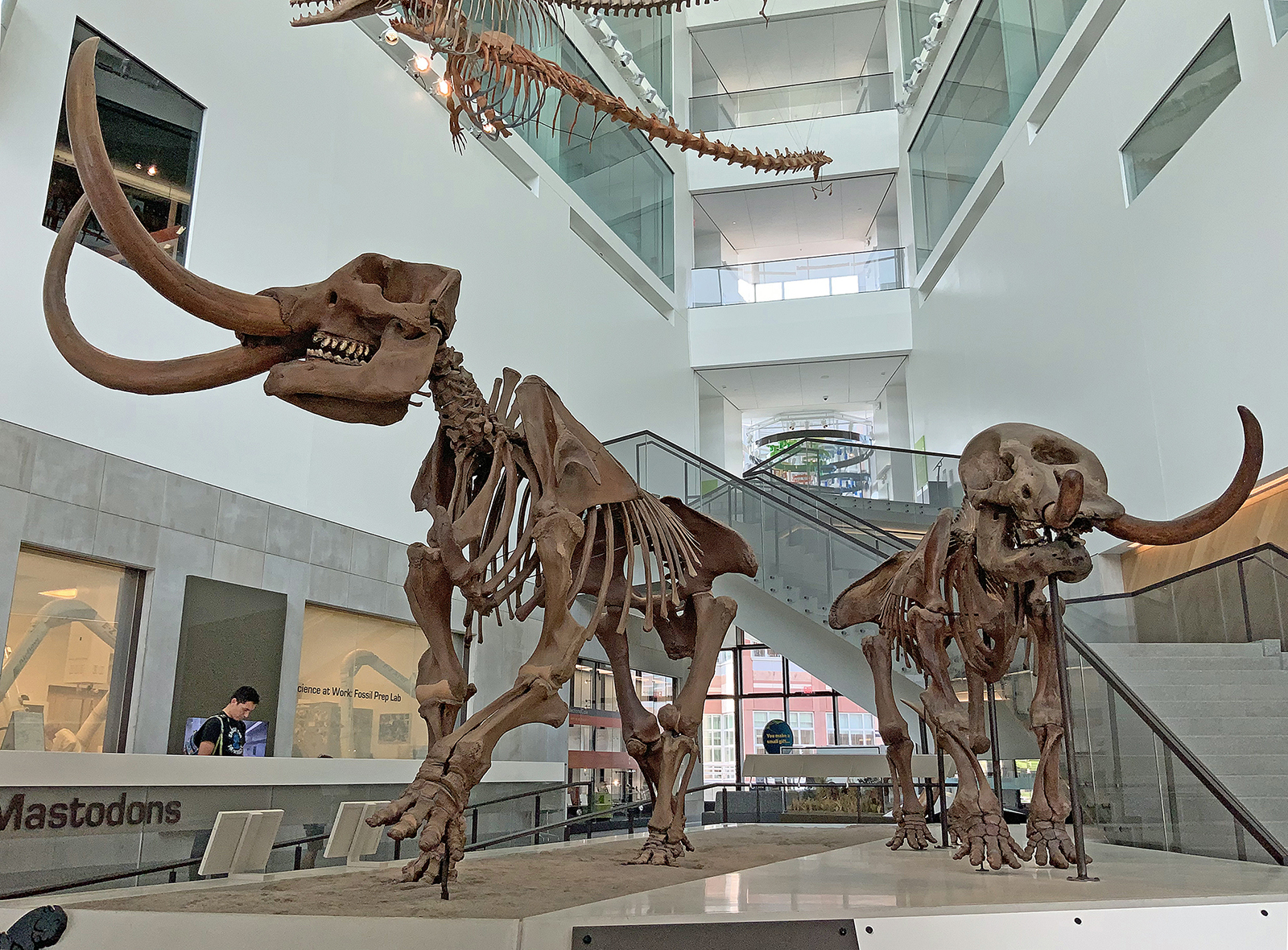
- The museum's signature mastodon skeletons, on display in the main atrium
- Former name: Exhibit Museum, Exhibit Museum of Natural History
- Established: 1956
- Location: Ann Arbor, Michigan, US
- Type: Natural history museum
- Website: lsa.umich.edu/ummnh

The University of Michigan Museum of Natural History (UMMNH, formerly known as the Exhibit Museum and Exhibit Museum of Natural History) is a natural history museum of the University of Michigan in Ann Arbor, Michigan, United States. The university's natural history collections date to 1837, and have been on display since 1881. The current museum was founded in 1956, and is operated by the university's College of Literature, Science, and the Arts.

The university's natural history collection was housed in the Alexander G. Ruthven Museums Building from 1928 to 2017, when preparations began to move the museum to the new Biological Sciences Building on the university's Central Campus. The museum has over 45,000 square feet of exhibit space, and offers free admission to the general public.

== History ==
- Alexander G. Ruthven Museums Building
- U.S. Historic district – Contributing property
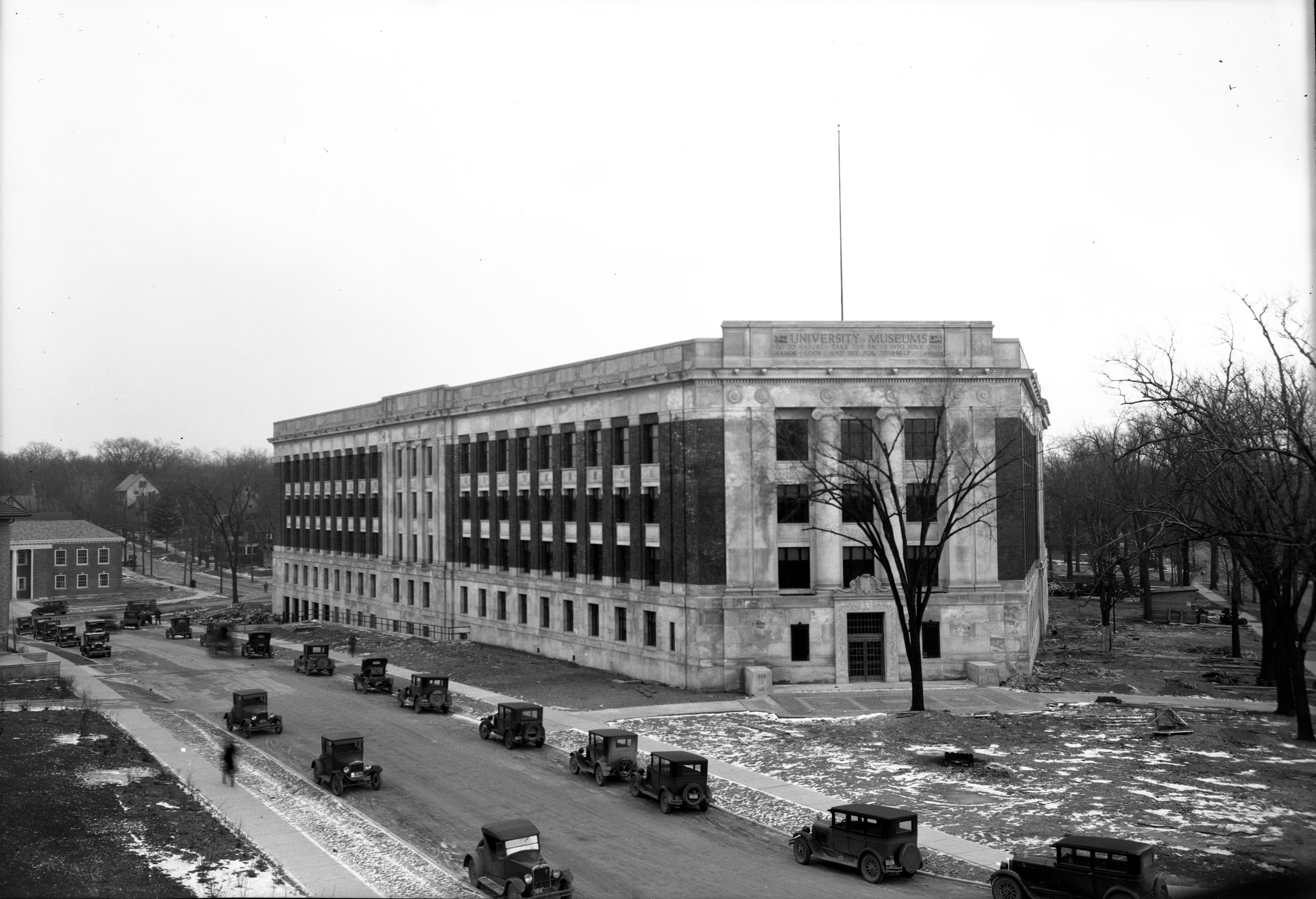
- View of the building, looking east, 1928. The street to the left is now a pedestrian pathway.
- Architect: Albert Kahn
- Part of: University of Michigan Central Campus Historic District (ID78001514)
- Designated CP: June 15, 1978

The university's natural history collections began in 1837, and the first formal museum for their exhibit was established in 1881. In 1925, the state legislature appropriated $900,000 (equivalent to $12,800,000 in 2024) for the construction of a new museum building, which would house researchers' offices and public exhibits. The new University Museums Building was completed in 1928, and housed museums of anthropology, paleontology and zoology, and a herbarium. The first public exhibits in the new building opened in the winter of 1929.

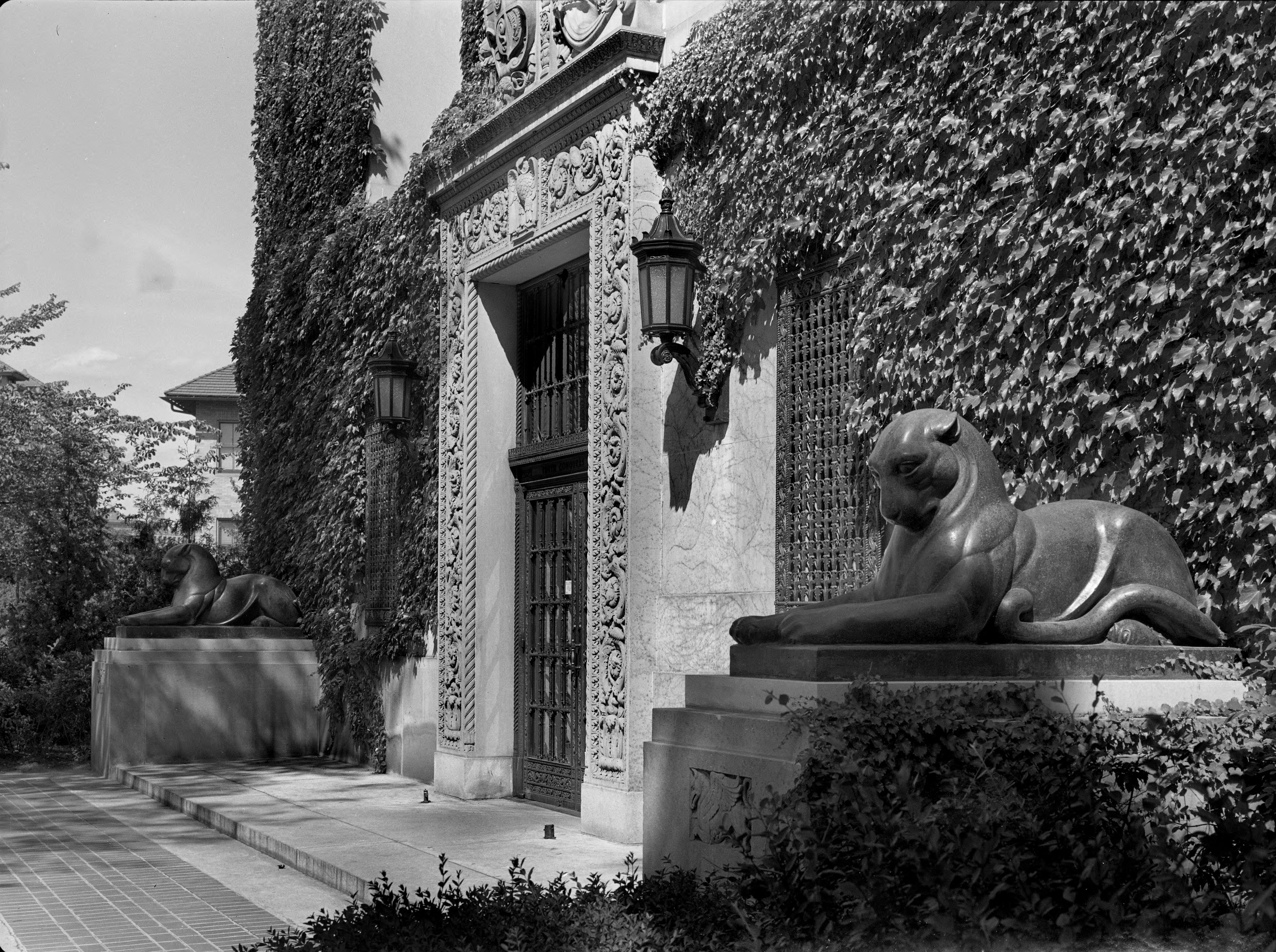
Front entrance of the Ruthven Building in 1940, with the newly-installed pumas

The University Museums Building was built with two pedestals at its main entrance for sculptures, but none were installed at the time of its construction. In 1940, two sculptures of pumas, designed by Carleton W. Angell and cast in terrazzo, were created. The pumas were cast by the Detroit unit of the Works Progress Administration to Angell's design, and installation was complete by August 1940. The building was renamed after Alexander G. Ruthven, director of the museum and later president of the university.

The public exhibit museum was founded in 1956, following a reorganization of the university's science departments. A planetarium was added in 1959, and the building was expanded in 1964.

The museum closed to the public in 2017 to move its collection to the new Biological Sciences Building, constructed adjacent to the Ruthven building on the university's Central Campus. The new building includes classrooms, researchers' offices, and the museum's exhibit spaces. The relocated museum reopened in 2019.

The museum is a 501(c)(3) tax-exempt non-profit organization. In 2019, it employed 23 full-time staff and over 50 paid student docents.

== Exhibits ==
The museum has four major permanent exhibits:

- The Hall of Evolution on the second floor displays exhibits on evolution and prehistoric life, including fossils, models, and dioramas of dinosaurs, ancient whales, mastodons, and other organisms. It is the largest collection on prehistoric life in Michigan.
- The Michigan Wildlife Gallery on the third floor displays exhibits on birds, mammals, reptiles, amphibians, plants, and fungi native to the Great Lakes. There are taxidermy specimens, exhibits on habitats, and displays about regional environmental problems. A mastodon trackway, the largest on display in the world, is part of this exhibit.
- The Anthropology Displays feature exhibits on anthropology, and include artifacts from human cultures around the world.
- The Geology Displays on the fourth floor feature a collection of the several rocks and minerals.

Two galleries display exhibits on "Evolution & Health" and archaeological research work in the U-M Museum of Archaeological Anthropology. The first floor Rotunda Lobby currently displays "The Invisible World of Mites".

== Gallery ==
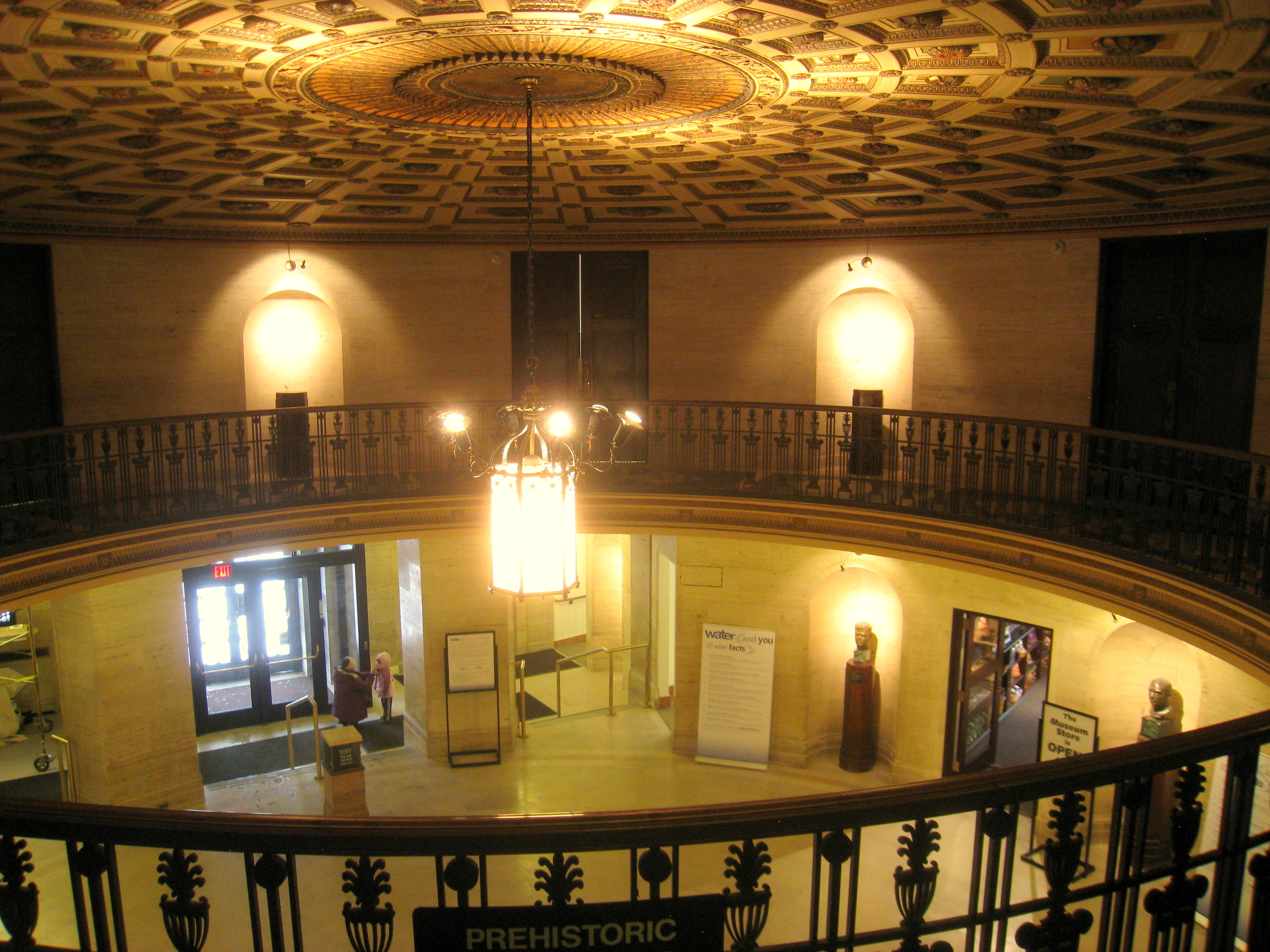
Lobby rotunda in the Alexander Ruthven Museums Building

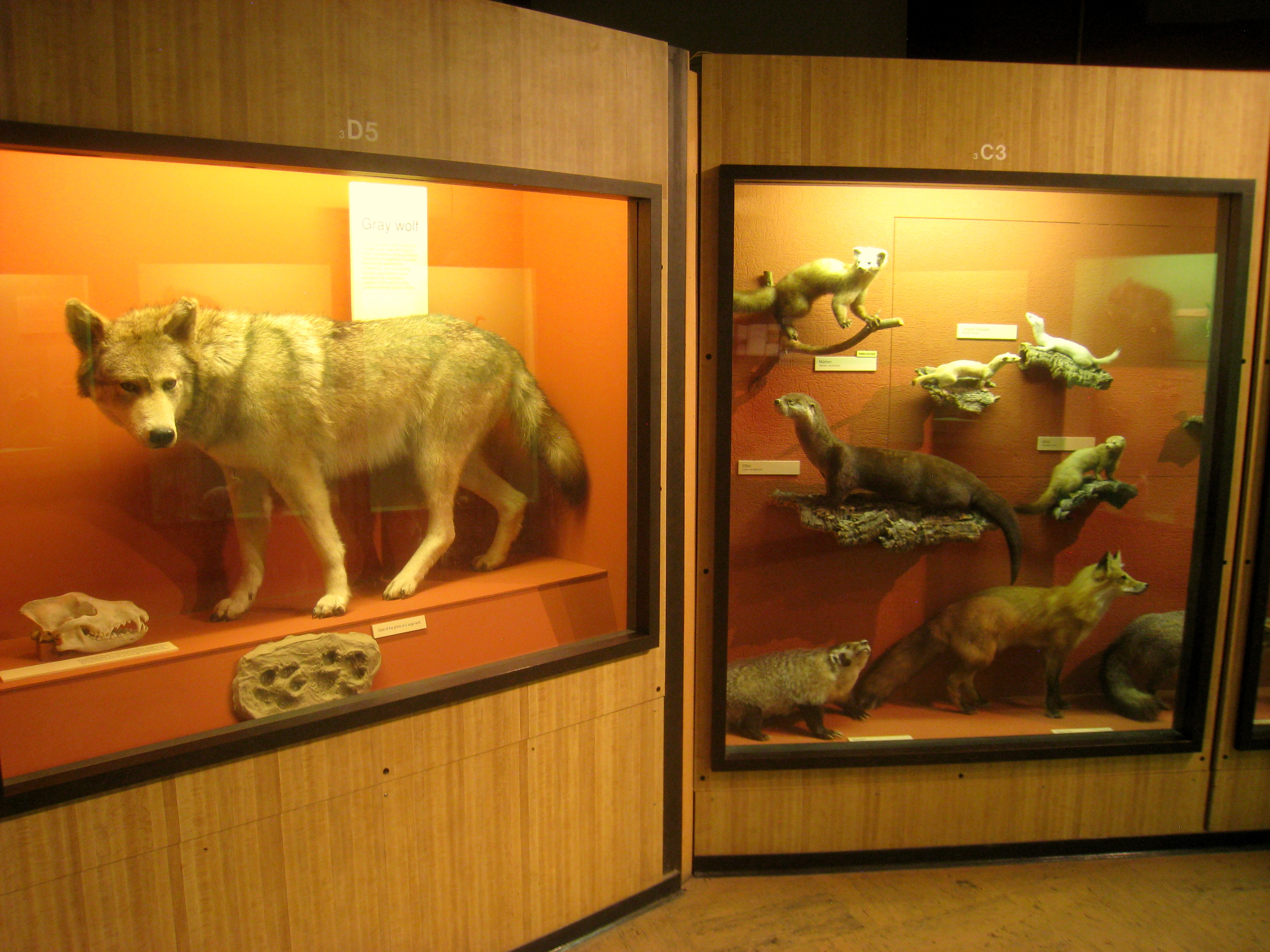
The Michigan Wildlife Gallery in the Alexander Ruthven Museums Building

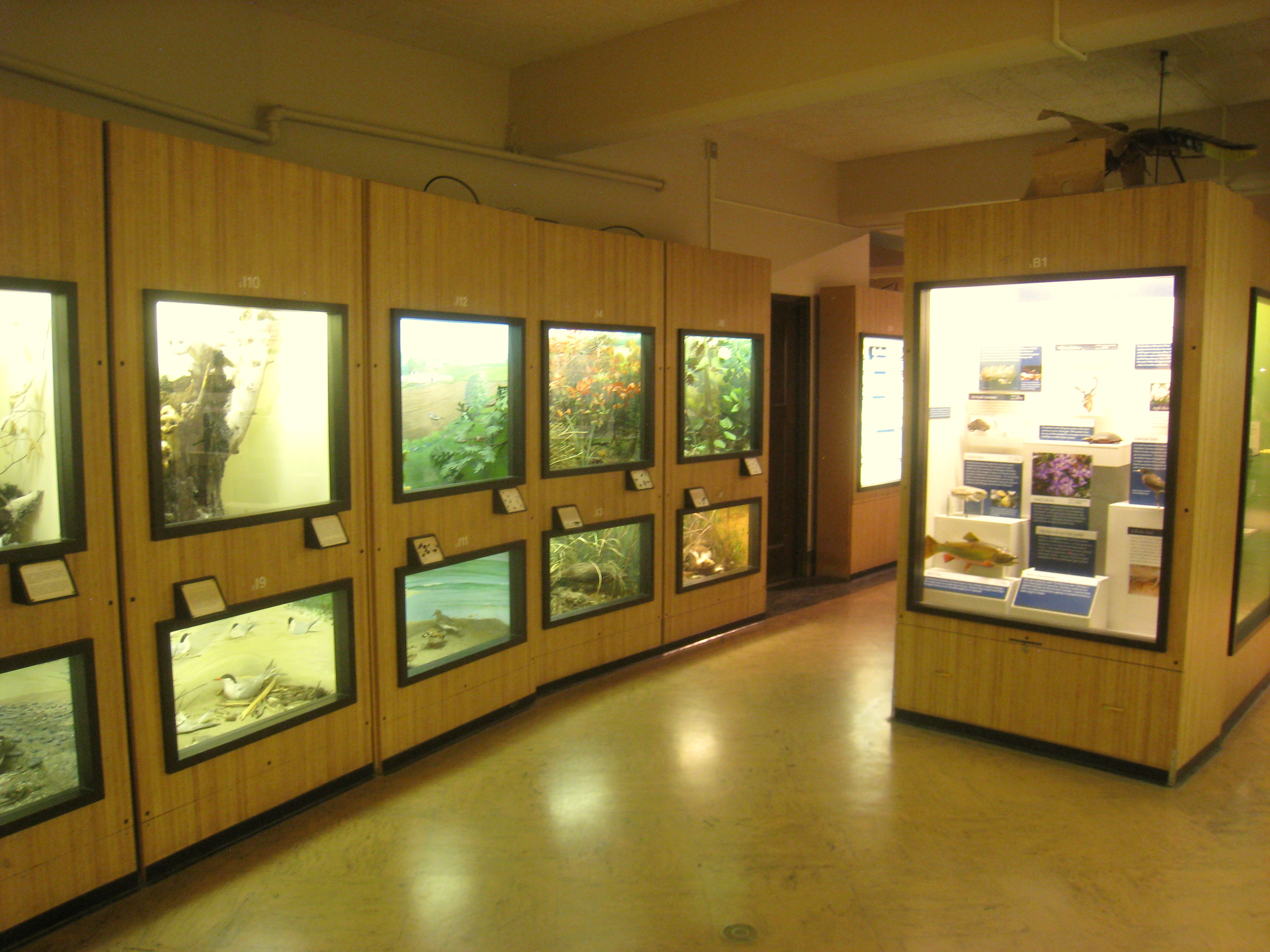
The Michigan Wildlife Gallery in the Alexander Ruthven Museums Building

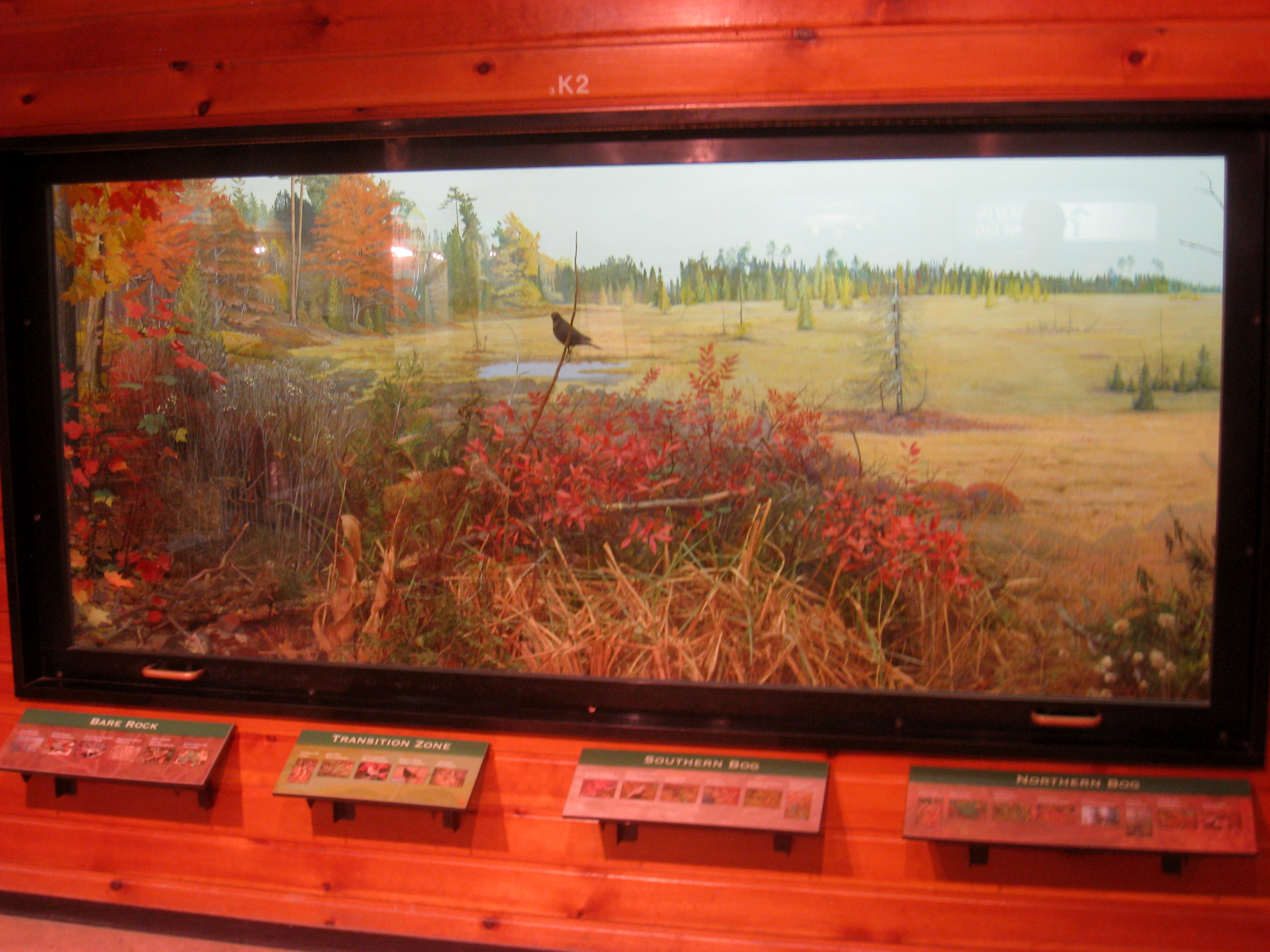
The Michigan Wildlife Gallery in the Alexander Ruthven Museums Building

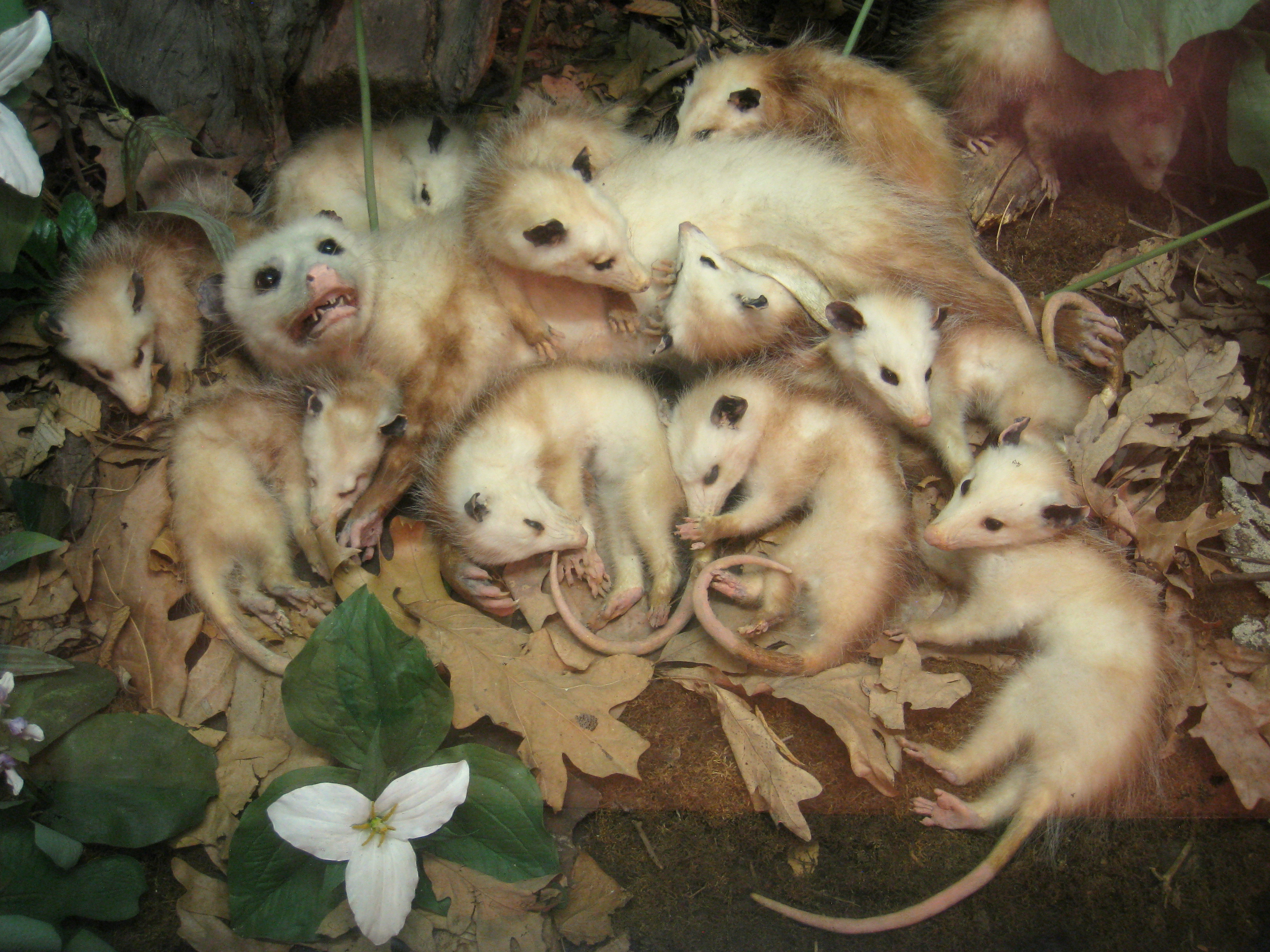
Previous Michigan Wildlife Gallery: Opossums

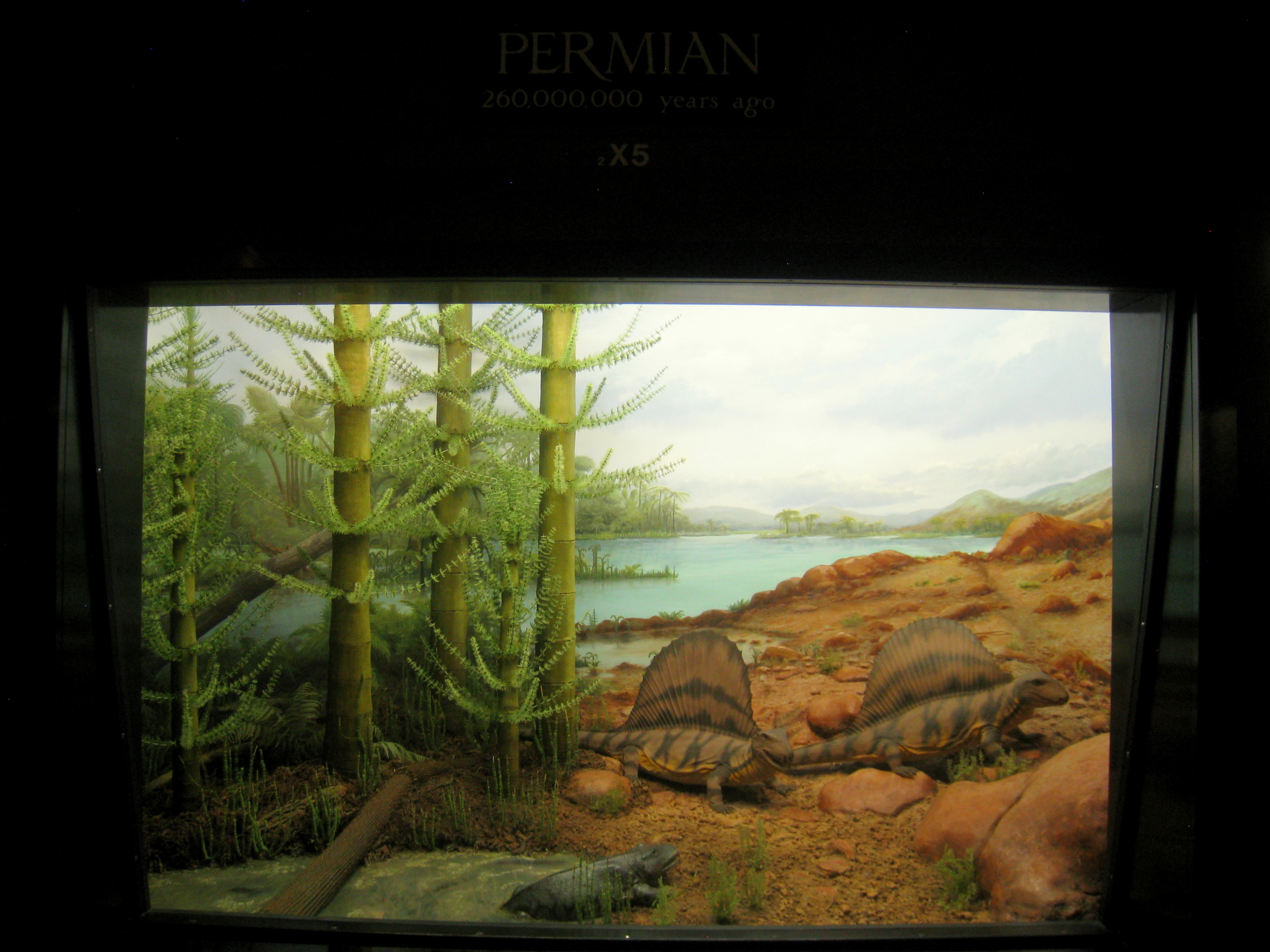
Previous Hall of Evolution: Permian Period

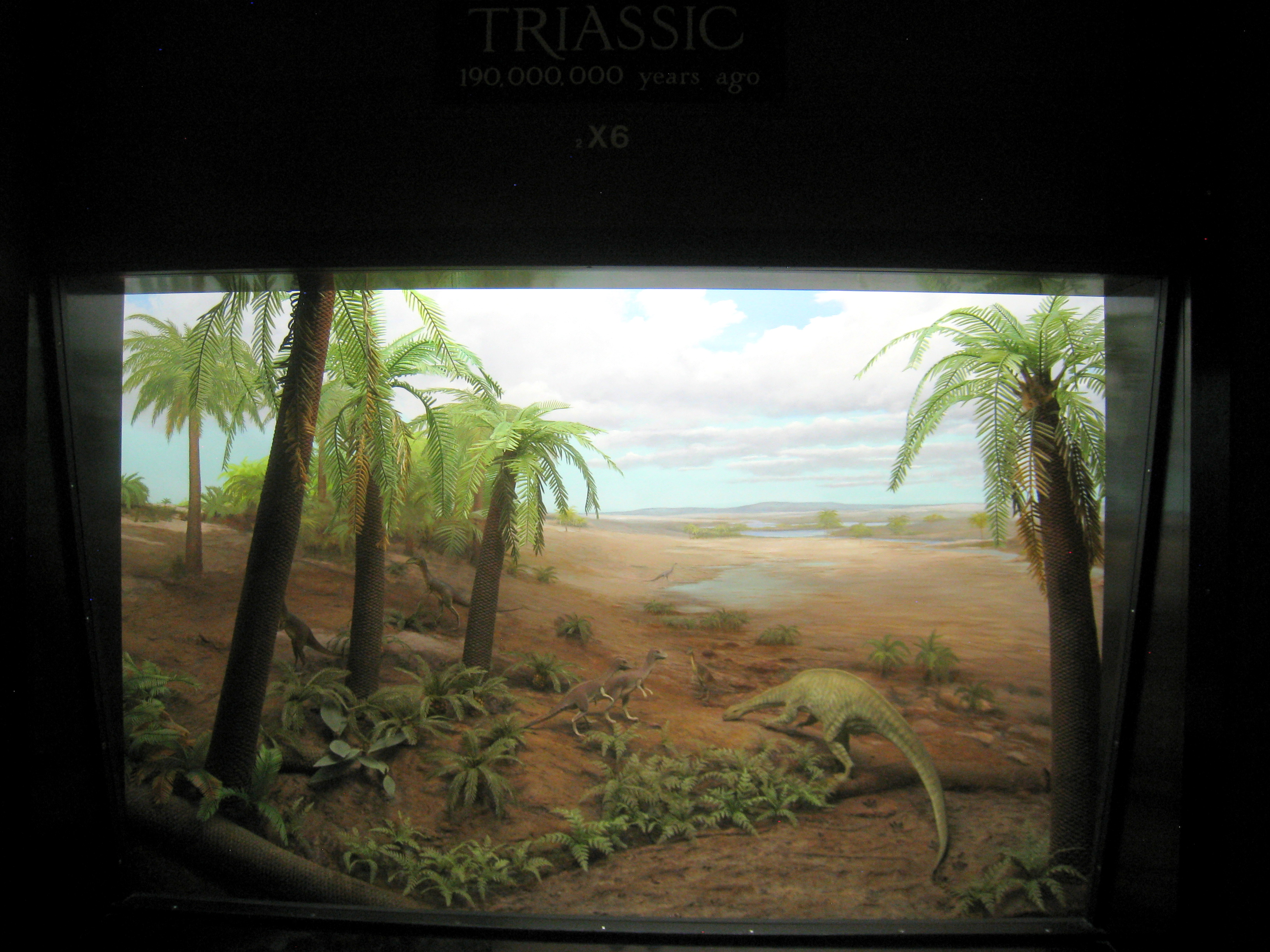
Previous Hall of Evolution: Triassic Period

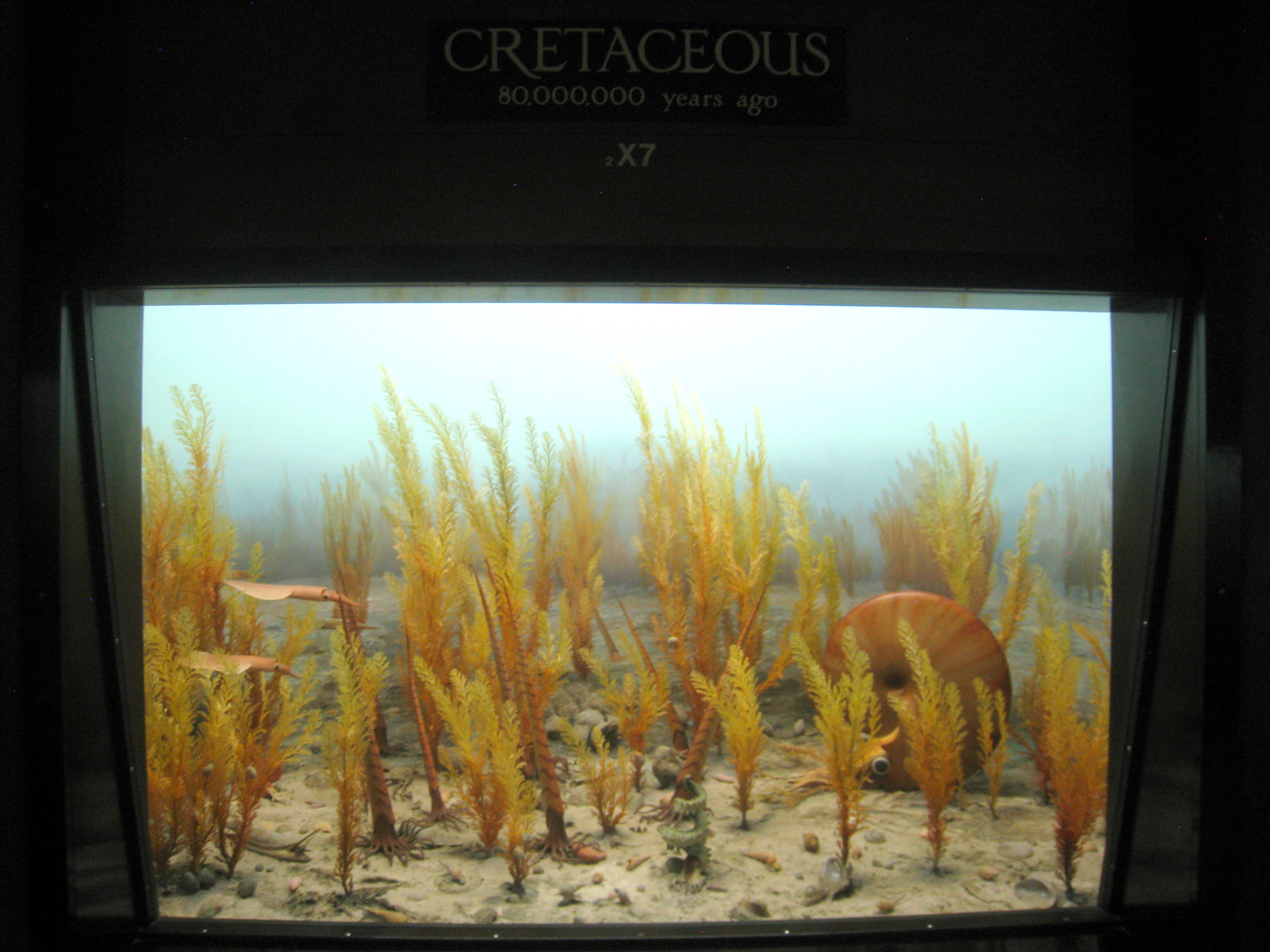
Previous Hall of Evolution: Cretaceous Period

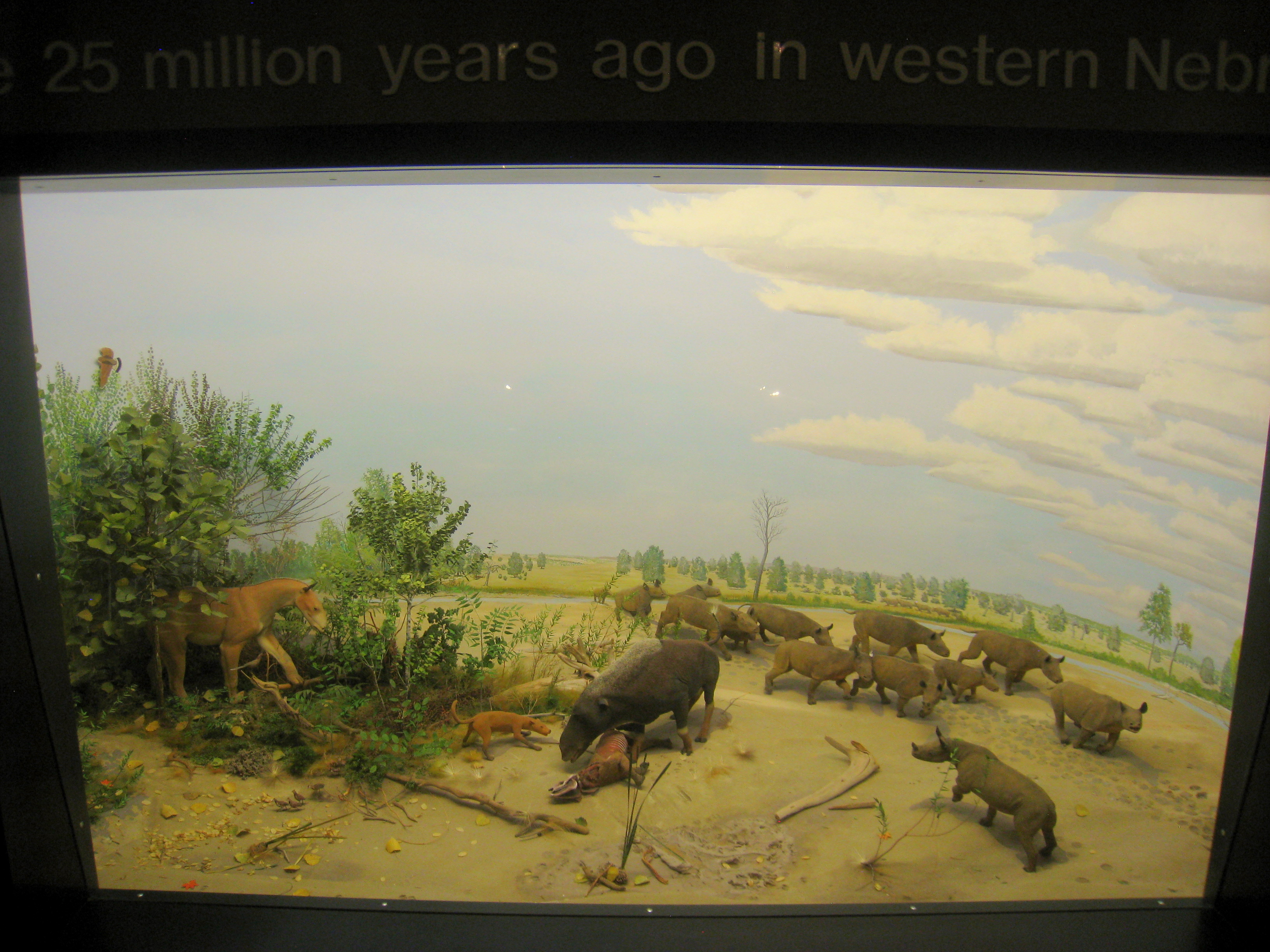
Previous Hall of Evolution: Oligocene Epoch

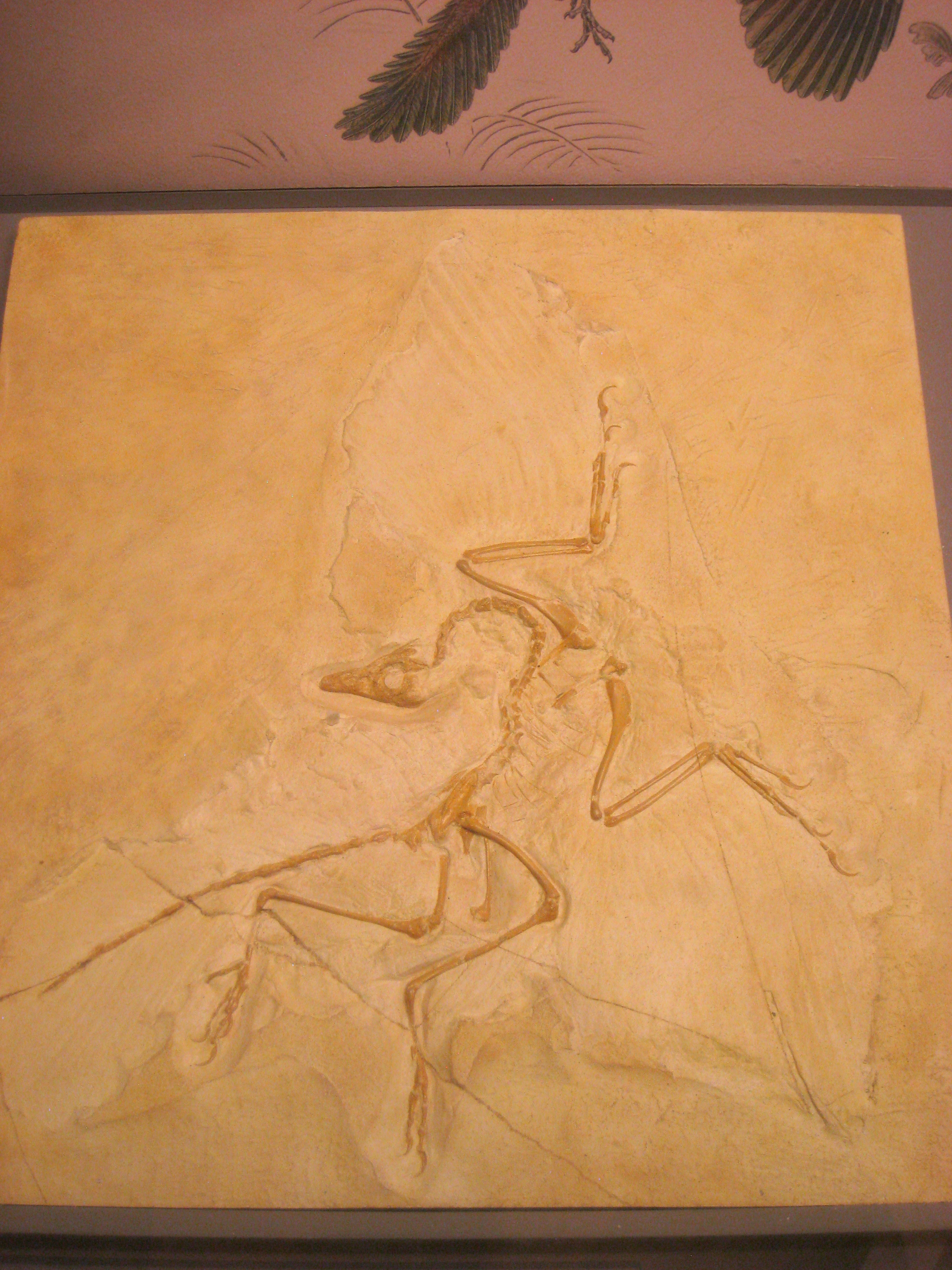
Replica of an Archaeopteryx fossil
