= University of Michigan Central Campus Historic District =

- U.S. National Register of Historic Places
- U.S. Historic district
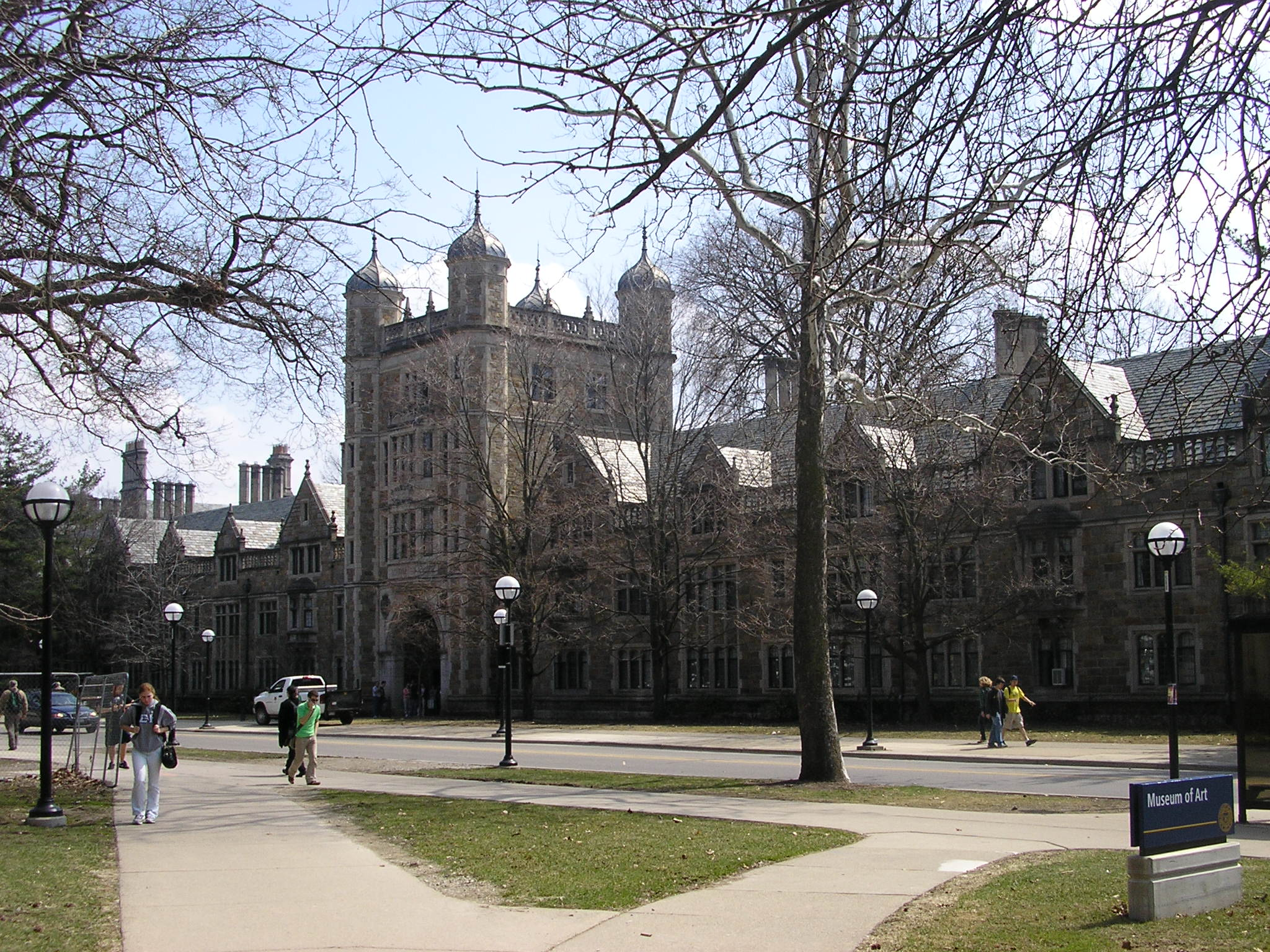
- The Law Quadrangle, a contributing property to the historic district
- Interactive map
- Location: University of Michigan campus, Ann Arbor, Michigan
- Coordinates: 42°16′37″N 83°44′15″W
- Area: 85 acres (34 ha)
- Built: 1840
- Architects: Albert Kahn, Smith, Hinchman and Grylls, Spier and Rohns, and Donaldson and Meier
- Architectural style: Late 19th and 20th Century Revivals; Late Victorian; Art Deco
- NRHP reference No.: 78001514
- Added to NRHP: June 15, 1978

The University of Michigan Central Campus Historic District is a historic district consisting of a group of major buildings on the campus of the University of Michigan in Ann Arbor, Michigan. It was listed on the National Register of Historic Places in 1978.

== History ==
The Ann Arbor Land Company gifted the fledgling University of Michigan forty acres of land at this spot in the late 1830s. The university accepted, and in 1840, the first four buildings, residences for faculty, were constructed. A dormitory/classroom building was soon added, and classes began on campus in 1841. In 1852, the university's first president, Henry Philip Tappan, moved into one of the faculty houses, and it as served as the President's House ever since. More buildings were added to the campus, including the 1856 Chemistry Building, and by 1871 the university was one of the largest in the country.

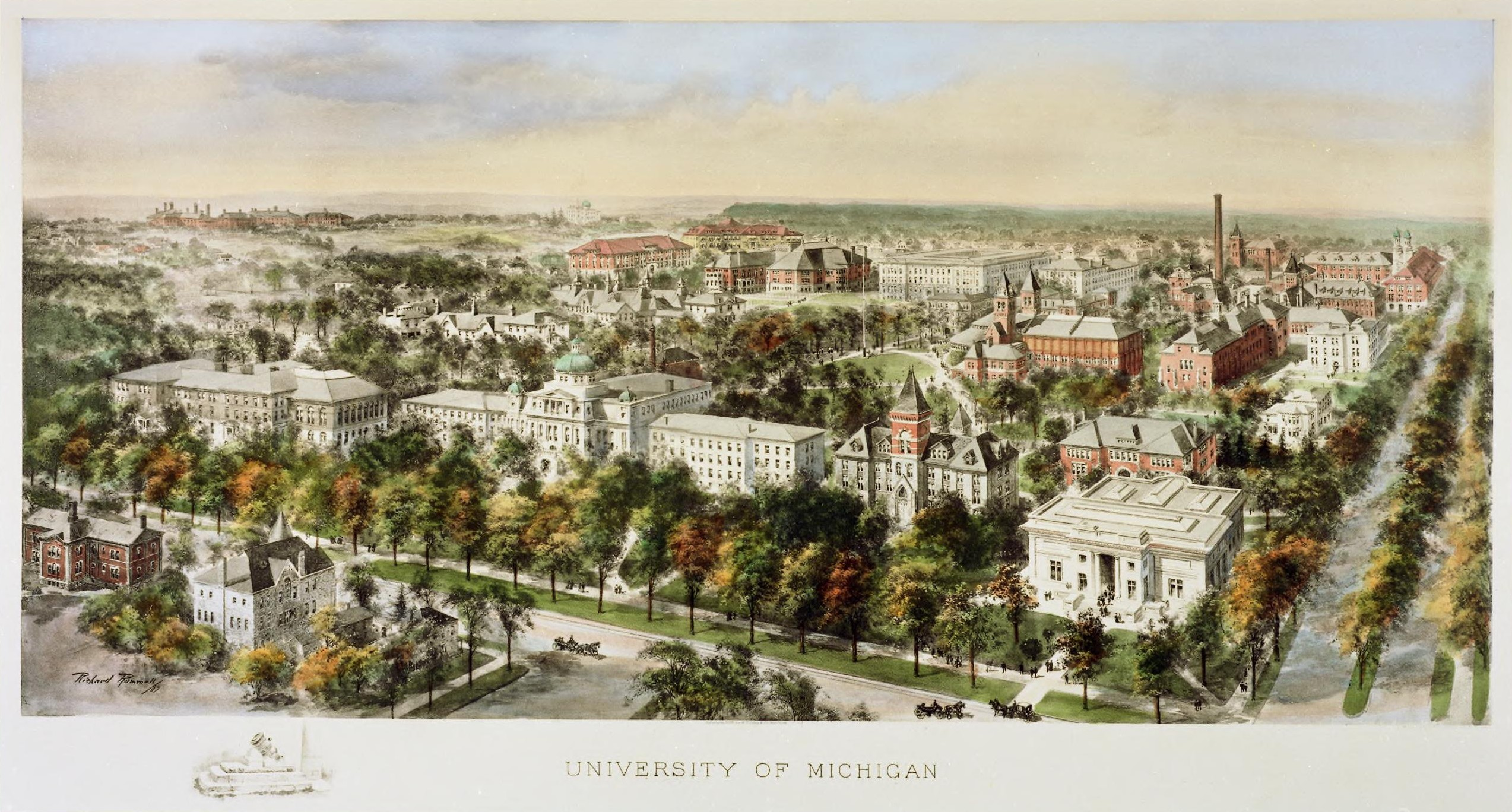
A hand-colored lithograph depicting a view of the University of Michigan by Richard Rummell in 1907

More buildings were added in the late 1800s, under president James Burrill Angell. In 1901, construction began on the West Engineering Building, the first campus building designed by Albert Kahn (in this case in partnership with George D. Mason). Kahn would go on to design ten significant structures on the university's central campus, primarily under the stewardship of William L. Clements as chair of the university's Buildings and Grounds Committee. A substantial number of buildings were added to the university in the 1910s and 1920s. The onset of the Great Depression slowed the pace of growth, and the last two architecturally significant structures, the Burton Memorial Tower and the Rackham building, were added in the late 1930s.

== Description ==
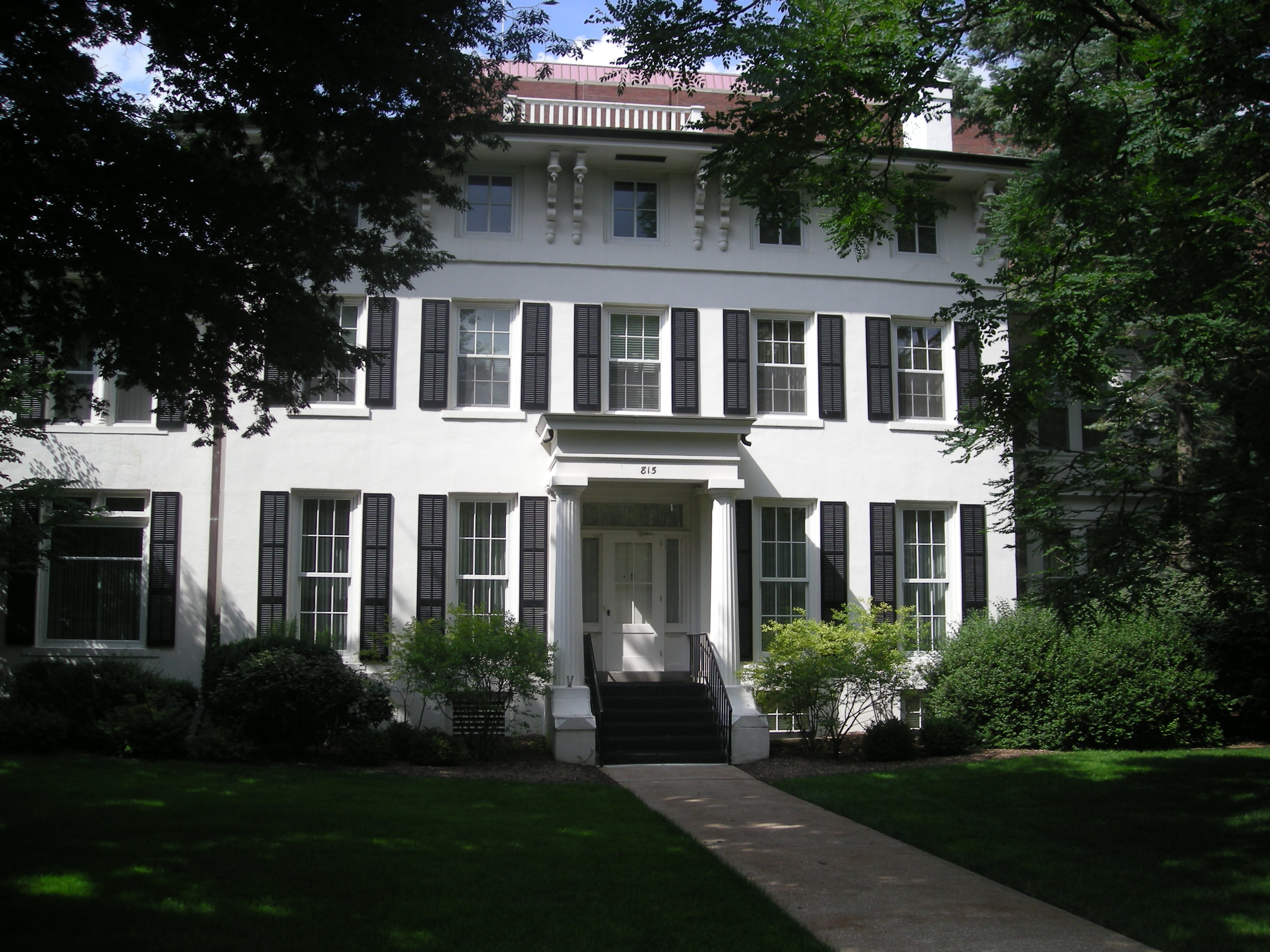
President's House, built in 1840

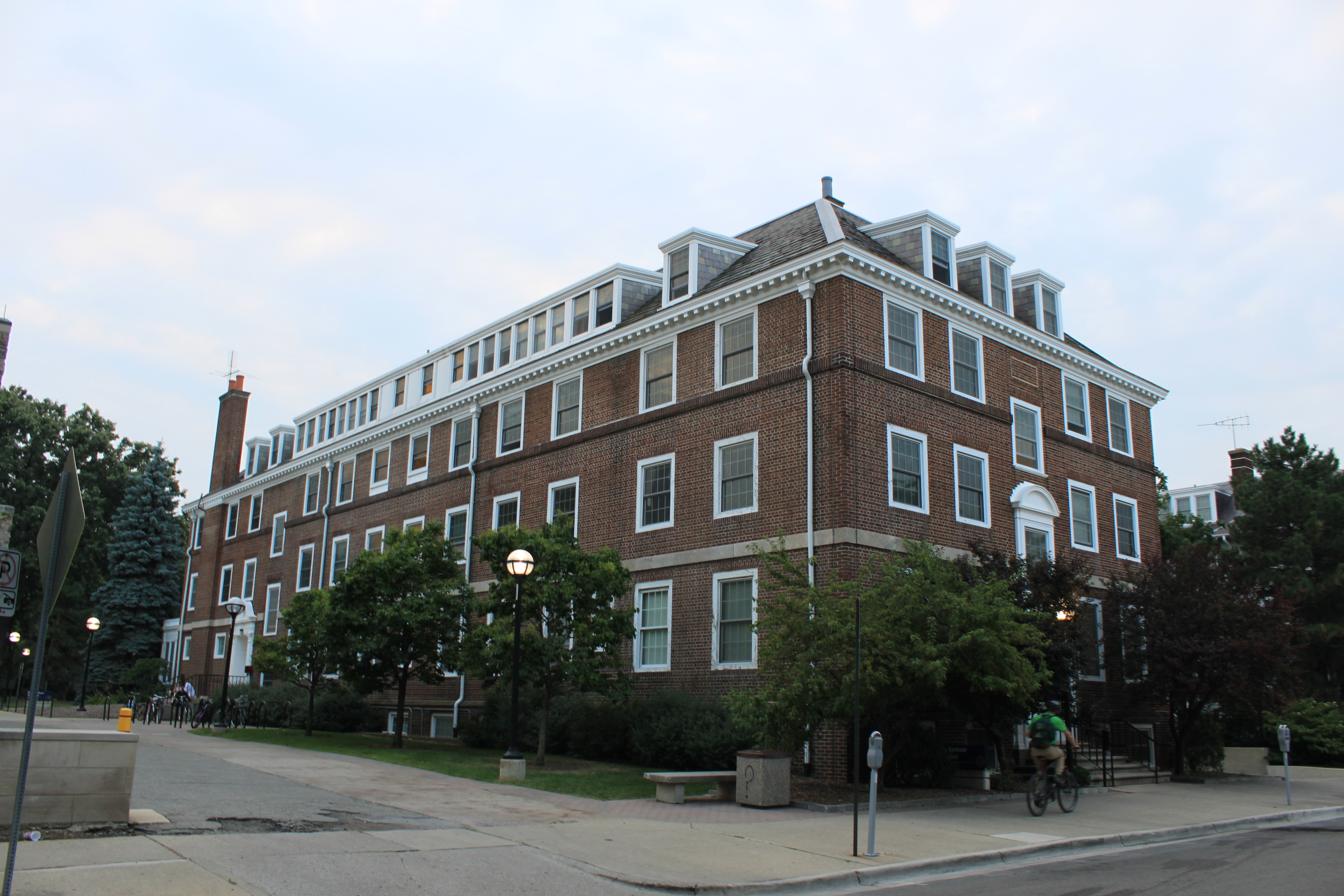
Betsy Barbour residence hall, built in 1920

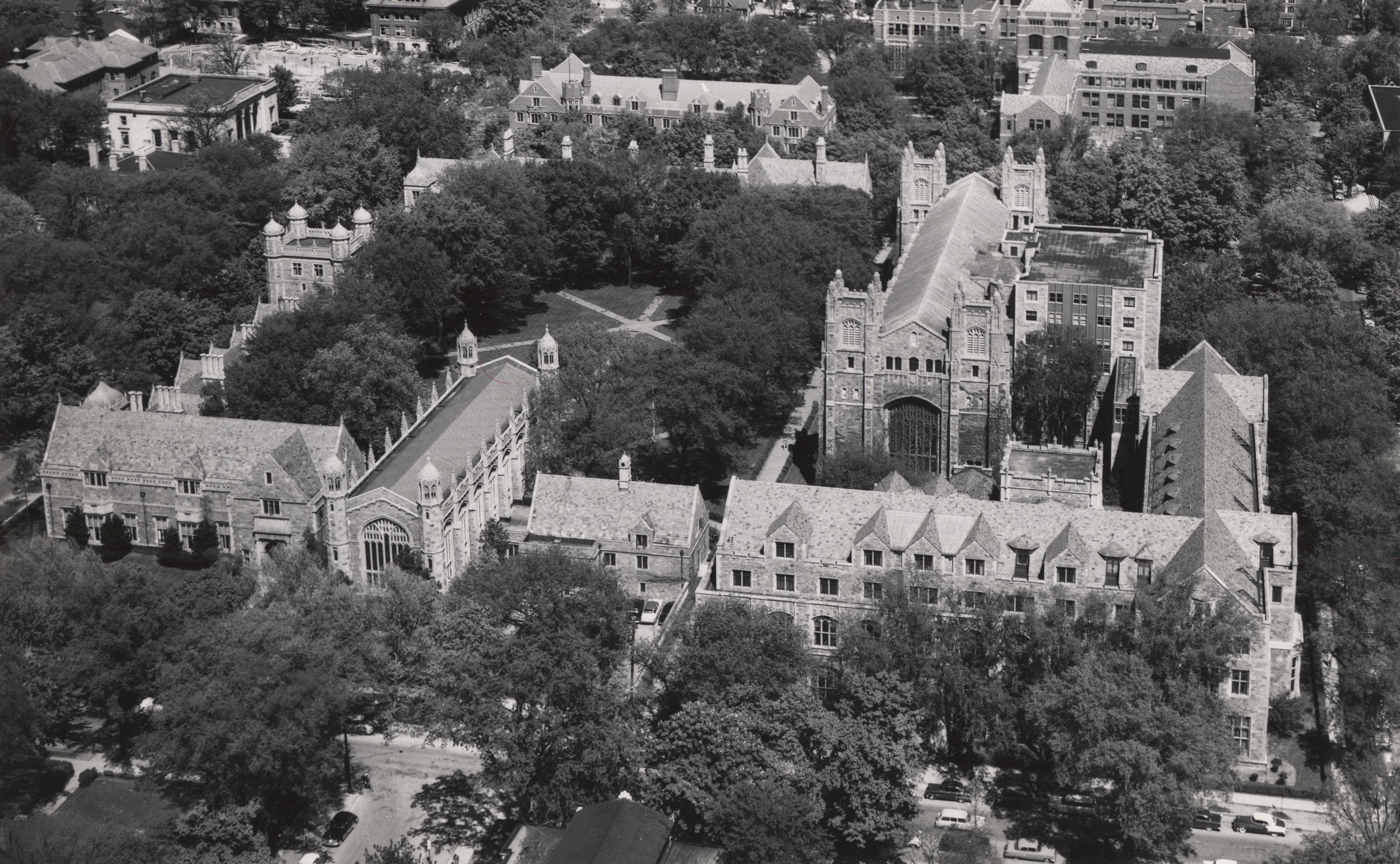
Aerial view of the University of Michigan Law Quadrangle, 1930-1940 ca.

The University of Michigan Central Campus Historic District contains nearly thirty significant buildings. These buildings were constructed over a range of dates, with the first, the President's House, constructed in 1840. Fully ten of the buildings were designed by Albert Kahn, who was University Supervising Architect from 1920 to 1925. Other architectural firms such as Smith, Hinchman and Grylls, Spier and Rohns, and Donaldson and Meier also designed buildings on campus. The center of the campus is defined by The Diag, a central open space about which many of the buildings are arranged. Historically significant buildings in the district, listed chronologically by construction date, are:

- President's House (1840): Originally a Greek Revival building, and one of the first structures built at the university, the house was added onto numerous times. The Italianate form it currently has was created during an 1860s renovation. The four corner chimneys and Doric front portico show the original design.
- Economics Building (Old Chemistry) (1856): Designed by A. H. Jordan of Detroit, this is a two-story brick Italianate building. It was significantly altered over the years, and eventually had a combination hipped and gabled roof with a dentilated cornice, and a central entrance with a metal hood. The building was destroyed by fire on Christmas Eve, 1981.
- Tappan Hall (1894): Designed by Spier and Rohns, this is a two-story brick structure on a masonry foundations. It has a central Richardsonian Romanesque Syrian arch and a hipped roof with four rectangular dormers.
- West Engineering Building (1901-1910): designed by George D. Mason and Albert Kahn, this is an L-shaped reddish-brown brick building with a vaulted central arch at the intersection of the two wings. The arch serves as an entryway to the Diag. The building has a red tile hipped roof with dormers and an overhanging eaves.
- Natural Resources Building (New West Medical) (1904): Designed by Spier and Rohns, this building is a four-story Renaissance Revival building with a rock-faced masonry base and two stories of smooth coursed grey brick above. Contrasting pale buff brick panels and a central Doric portico are in the main facade.
- Chemistry Building (1909): Designed by Smith, Hinchman, and Grylls of Detroit, this building is a four-story buff brick block with Chicago windows and brick pilasters on the top three stories, and an ornamental cornice.
- Museum of Art (Alumni Memorial Hall) (1910): designed by Donaldson and Meier this Beaux Arts yellow sandstone building has a symmetrical five-part main facade and a central portico with paired Doric columns.
- Hill Auditorium (1913): designed by Albert Kahn and Ernest Wilby, this is a three-story reddish-brown brick building with a main facade containing four dominant Doric columns with five entrances spaced between, approached by a wide plaza and staircase. A decorative band of tapestry brick and tilework runs above, with an ornamental entablature containing copper cornice work and a terra cotta frieze.
- Key Office (Substation) (1914): designed by Smith, Hinchman and Grylls, this is a one-story rectangular painted brick structure with a hipped roof. Substantial additions were constructed in 1930 and 1957.
- Natural Science Building (1915): designed by Albert Kahn, this is a three-story maroon brick building with bands of tapestry brickwork.
- Martha Cook Building (1915): designed by Edward P. York and Philip Sawyer, this is a three and one half story, maroon brick, L-shaped dormitory with stone trim and a gabled slate roof. It contains a variety of window shapes: rectangular, pointed arch, and bay windows. The roof has gabled dormers and two towers. A statue of Shakespeare's Portia tops the Gothic entry on the main facade.
- Harlan Hatcher Graduate Library (1920): designed by Albert Kahn and Ernest Wilby, this building is a four-story reddish-brown brick structure with a red tile hipped roof. It contains a variety of ornamental trim, including an elaborate copper cornice, and large rectangular windows, many topped by decorative metal panels.
- William L. Clements Library (1923): designed by Albert Kahn, this building is a two-story rectangular limestone structure approached by a wide stair and plaza. The main facade has a Corinthian three-arch arcade.
- East Engineering Building (1923): designed by Smith, Hinchman and Grylls, this building is a four-story Neo-Classical reddish-brown brick building. The windows are flanked by Corinthian brick pilasters, and there is terra cotta molding and a tapestry brick frieze above.
- School of Education Building (1923-1930), University High School (1924), University Elementary School (1930): This complex was designed by architects Dwight Perkins, William K. Fellows, and John L. Hamilton of Chicago, with Malcomson and Higginbotham designing the elementary school. It is a maroon brick quadrangular with an irregular roof line, surrounding an inner courtyard. Large Gothic windows and buttresses highlight one end of the main facade.
- Randall Laboratory for Physics (1924): designed by Albert Kahn, this is an L-shaped reddish brown brick building with four stories above grade and three below. It has an ornamental copper cornice and Doric brick pilasters on the upper three stories.
- Angell Hall (1924): designed by Albert Kahn, this is a four-story limestone and brick Neo-Classical Revival building with a central fifth story observatory. The main facade has a massive central portico with eight Doric columns supporting a frieze. Two thirteen-bay flanking wings contain Doric pilasters.
- The Law Quadrangle (1924-1933): designed by York and Sawyer, this is a Gothic Revival complex surrounding a courtyard. It is constructed of seam-faced granite and limestone, with a slate roofs. The complex consists of the 1924 Lawyers' Club, the 1930 L-shaped John Potter Cook Dormitory wings, the 1931 rectangular Law Library, and the 1933 Hutchins Hall.
- 1100 North University Avenue (1925): designed by Albert Kahn, this is a four-story reddish-brown brick building on a stone base. The main facade contains four engaged Ionic stone columns framed by paired Doric brick pilasters. Formerly named after C. C. Little from 1968–2019.
- The Alexander G. Ruthven Museums Building (1928): designed by Albert Kahn, this building is similar in design to 1100 North University Avenue.
- Architecture and Design Building (1928): designed by Emil Lorch and Associates, this is an L-shaped maroon brick and stone building with a slate roof. It has a central six-story tower flanked by three- and four-story wings. The windows are ornamented by decorated metal architraves and stone stringcourses.
- Michigan League and Lydia Mendelssohn Theater (1929): designed by Allen B. Pond and Irving K. Pond, this is a three-story reddish brick and stone building with a gabled slate roof. It has large round arch windows with stained glass panels.
- Burton Memorial Tower (1936): designed by Albert Kahn, this is an eleven-story limestone Art Deco tower with a belfry, clock, and copper hipped roof at the top. Narrow pilasters and rectangular windows line the sides.
- Horace H. Rackham Building (1938): designed by Smith, Hinchman and Grylls, this is a symmetrical Art Deco structure with a copper cornice, copper hipped roof, and a monumental staircase. The central portion has five large rectangular windows and three massive bronze and glass doors.
- Haven Hall and Mason Hall (1952): designed by Smith, Hinchman and Grylls, this is a complex of red brick and concrete buildings connected to Angell Hall.
- Undergraduate Library (1957): designed by Albert Kahn Associates, this is a red brick block containing patterns of blue porcelain and clear glass panels.
- Pharmacy Building (1960): designed by Bennett and Straight, this is a four-story red brick building connected to the C. C. Little Science Building. It has a rubbled cement finish.
- Physics and Astronomy Building (1963): designed by Albert Kahn Associates, this is an L-shaped red brick, steel, and concrete complex with a ten-story tower and two-story wing.
- Modern Languages Building (1971): designed by Albert Kahn Associates, this is a four-story rectangular building with alternating bands of red brick, concrete, and ribbon windows.

=== Weiser Hall ===
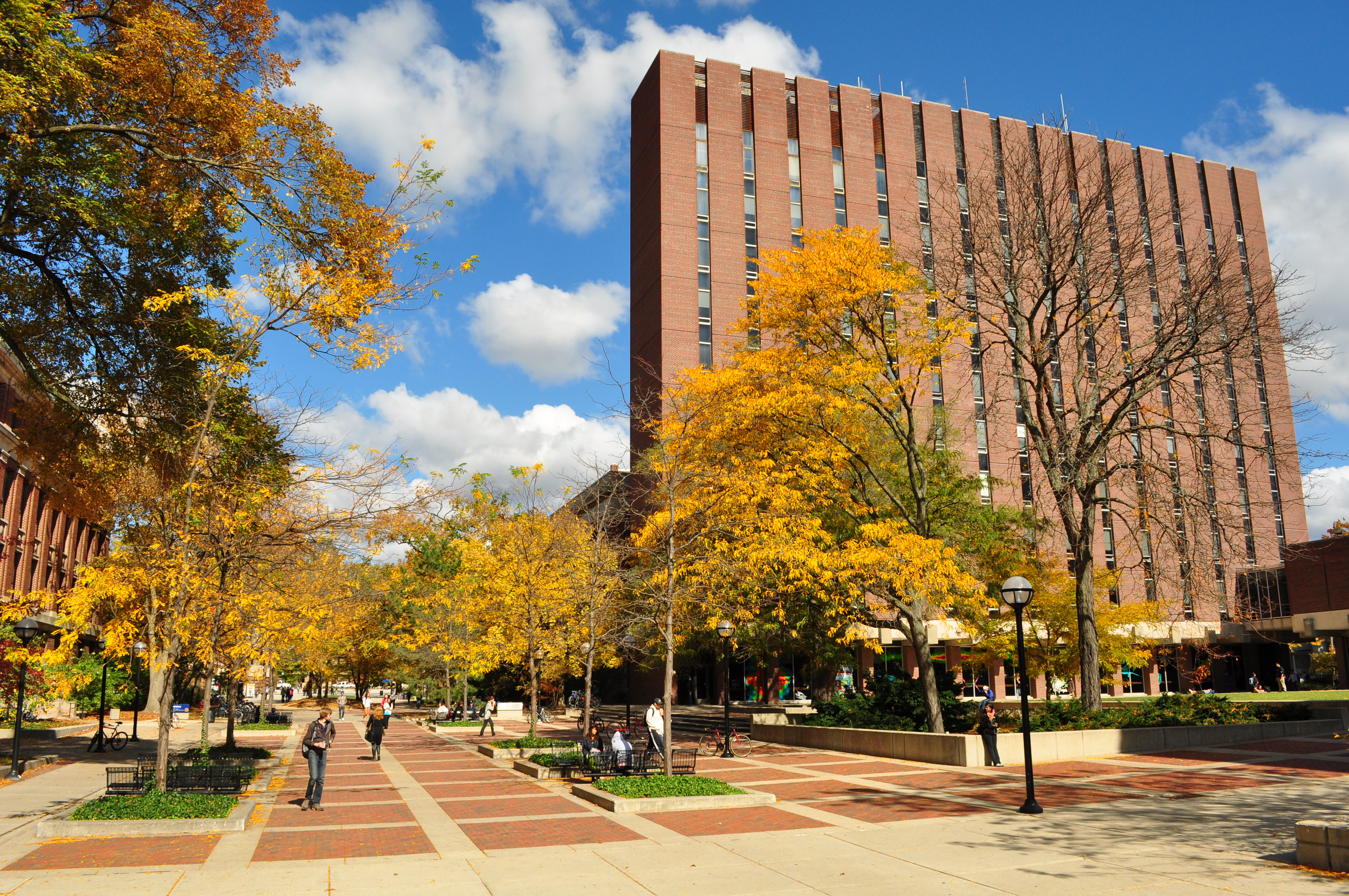
Weiser Hall from the South

Weiser Hall is an academic building located in the Central Campus. It was originally built in 1963 by Albert Kahn Associates, as the David M. Dennison Building. Originally named for David M. Dennison, it was renamed Weiser Hall in 2014 in recognition of U-M alumni and donors Ronald Weiser and Eileen Weiser. The building underwent a complete renovation reopening in September 2017.

The renovation, undertaken by architectural firm Diamond Schmitt Architects, involved completely gutting and rebuilding the entire tower. The brick on the tenth floor south side, and the entire southwest corner of every floor was removed and replaced with glass. This resulted in the development of a tenth-floor event space with catering kitchen and views of Ann Arbor through the floor to ceiling south facing wall of glass. The building is now home to a number of interdisciplinary and internationally-focused units within the College of Literature, Science, and the Arts, and is a center for active and engaged learning. Tenants in the Weiser Hall hi-rise include the Center for Global and Intercultural Study (CGIS), Community-Engaged Academic Learning (CEAL) and International Institute.
