= William L. Clements Library =

Library in Michigan, US

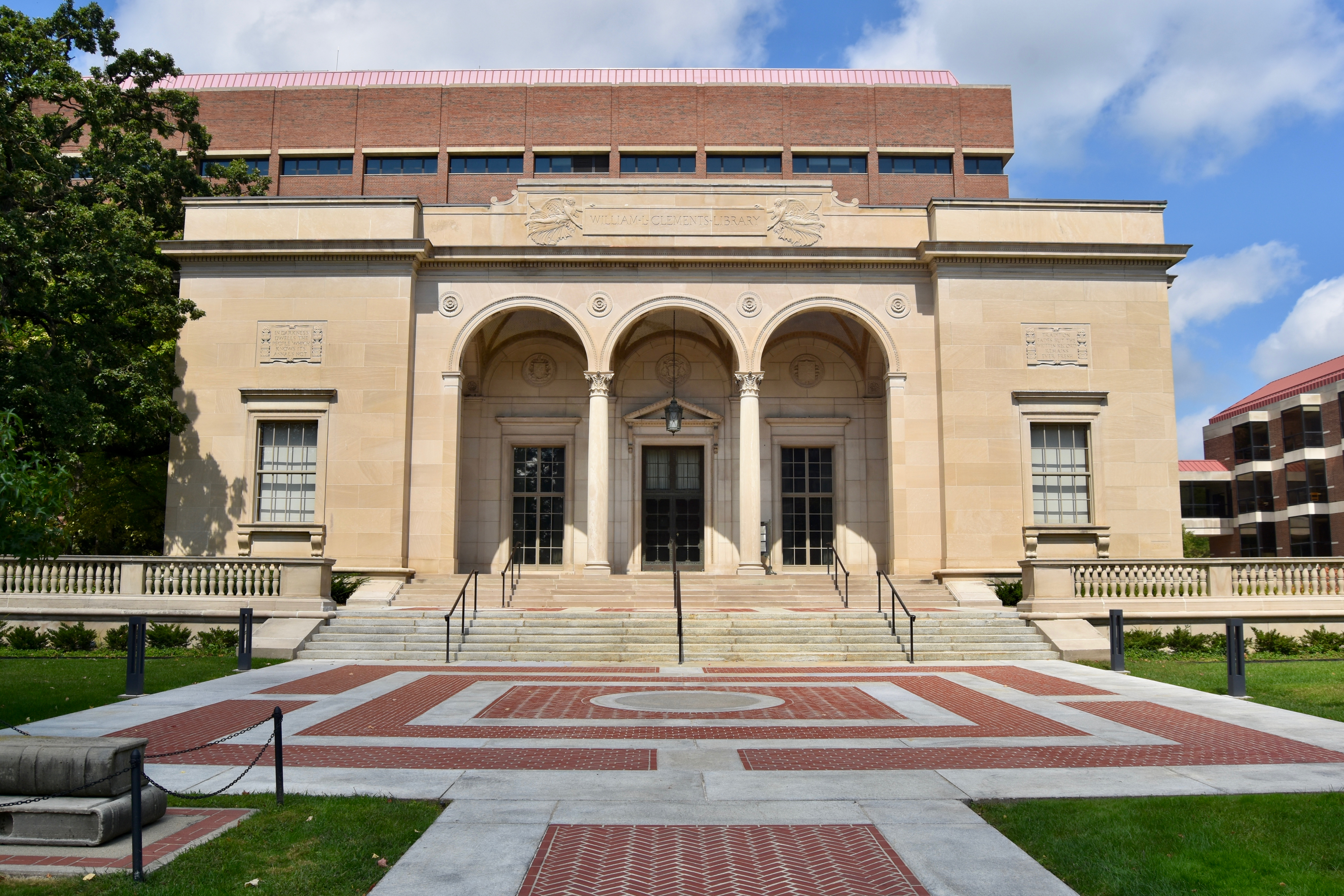
- The library in 2017
- 42.2755°N 83.7379°W
- Established: 1923; 103 years ago
- Architect: Albert Kahn

Collection
- Specialization: Americana

Other information
- Parent organization: University of Michigan Library
- Website: clements.umich.edu
- William L. Clements Library
- U.S. Historic district – Contributing property
- Built: 1923
- Architect: Albert Kahn
- Part of: University of Michigan Central Campus Historic District (ID78001514)
- Added to NRHP: June 15, 1978

The William L. Clements Library is a rare book and manuscript repository located on the University of Michigan's central campus in Ann Arbor, Michigan. Specializing in Americana and particularly North American history prior to the twentieth century, the holdings of the Clements Library are grouped into four categories: Books, Manuscripts, Graphics and Maps. The library's collection of primary source materials is expansive and particularly rich in the areas of social history, the American Revolution, and the colonization of North America. The Book collection includes 80,000 rare books, pamphlets, broadsides, and periodicals. Within the other divisions, the library holds 600 atlases, approximately 30,000 maps, 99,400 prints and photographs, 134 culinary periodicals, 20,000 pieces of ephemera, 2,600 manuscript collections, 150 pieces of artwork, 100 pieces of realia, and 15,000 pieces of sheet music.

The Clements Library is visited by over 450 researchers yearly. Patrons include undergraduate students, graduate students, faculty, and scholars from around the world, such as Pulitzer Prize-winning author and historian, David McCullough, who used the library's collections for the book 1776. The library building was designed by architect Albert Kahn.

== History ==
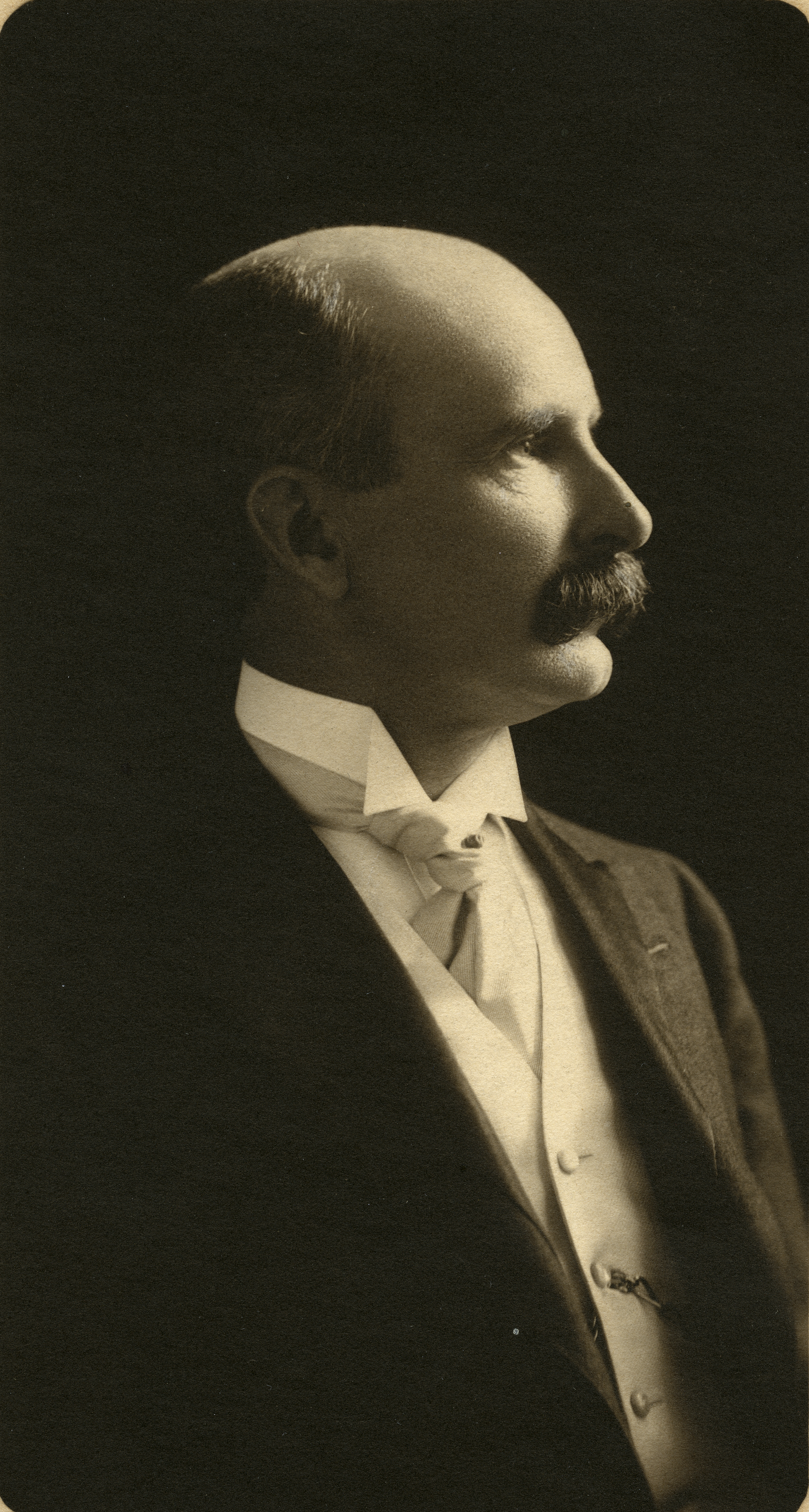
William L. Clements

William L. Clements, an alumnus and regent of the University of Michigan, founded the library in 1923. The library's initial collections were donated by Clements, an avid collector of materials relating to the discovery of the Americas by Europeans and the American Revolution. Clements' extensive personal collection included "20,000 volumes of rare books, 2,000 volumes of early newspapers, several hundred maps, and the papers of William Petty, 2nd Earl of Shelburne." Upon the opening of the library, Clements published the book, The William L. Clements Library of Americana at the University of Michigan, detailing the acquisition of his personal collection. The book and the Clements Library were reviewed by Lawrence C. Wroth in the New York Times on July 22, 1923. Wroth vigorously praised Clements, saying, "The Clements Library goes to the University of Michigan [as a collection] in which no inquiry concerning America between 1492 and 1800 need go unanswered."

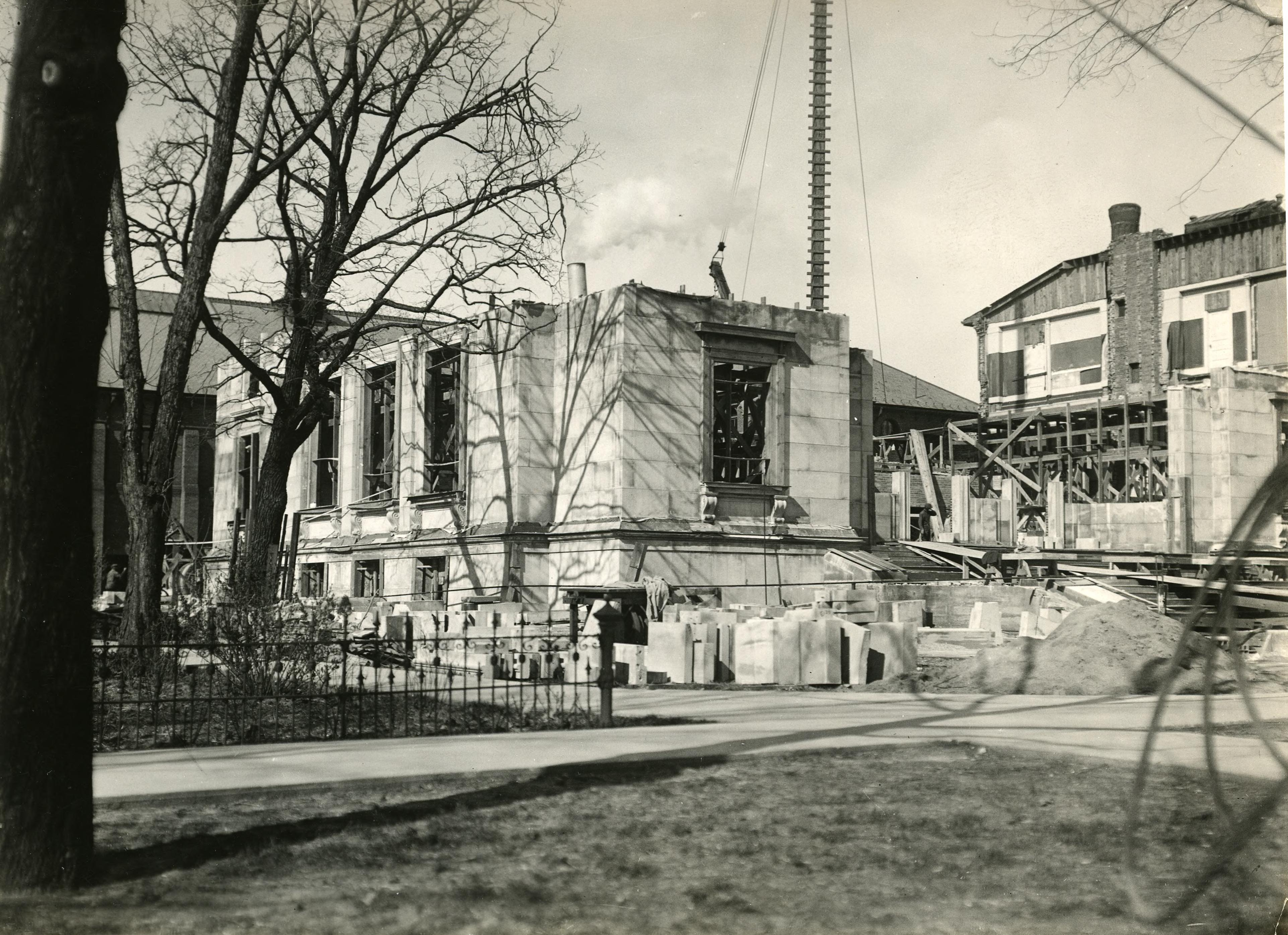
Clements Library under construction, 1922

In addition to giving his collection, Clements donated funds to build the current library building. Detroit architect Albert Kahn designed the building "in the Italian Renaissance style, based on Vignola's casino for the Villa Farnese, c. 1587, in Caprarola, Italy."

Among the restrictions Clements placed upon the library was that it should remain separate from the university's greater library system and be governed by an independent board of trustees. Today, this distinct governing structure remains in place, but the library's holdings are integrated into the University Library's Mirlyn catalog.

From 1935 to 1945 Howard Henry Peckham was manuscript curator, during which time Clements Library was acquiring collections that established an international reputation for itself as an institution for the study of the Revolutionary War and British Colonial America.

== Collections ==
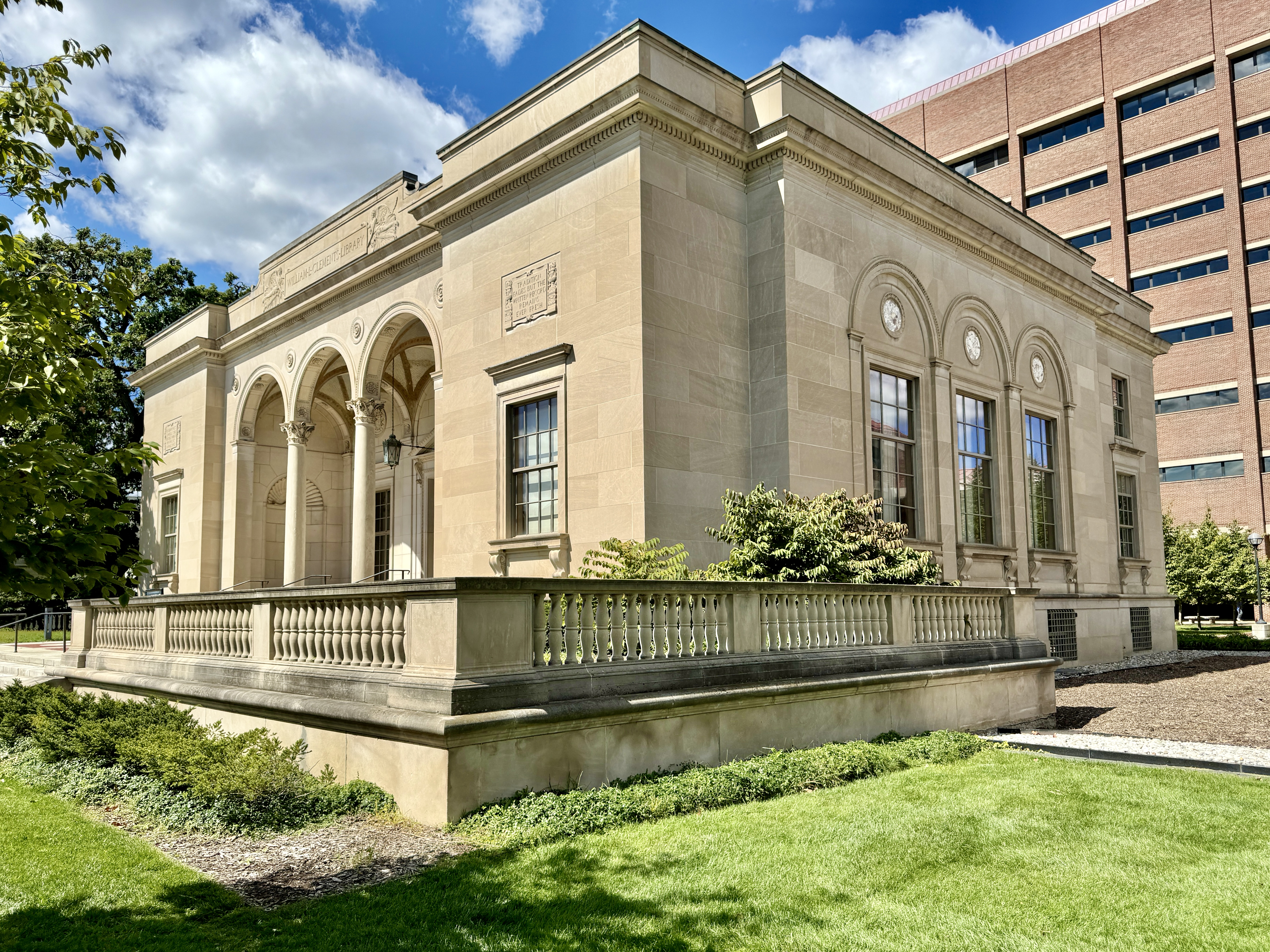
William L. Clements Library

The library's collections are spread across five divisions: the Book Division, the Manuscripts Division, the Graphics Division and the Map Division. The Janice Bluestein Longone Culinary Archive, established in 2002 as a fifth division, moved in 2013 to the Hatcher Library, the special collections section of the University of Michigan Library.

Exhibits showcasing the library's collection are on public display on weekday afternoons. Exhibited materials have included rare books, manuscripts, maps, photographs, and prints. Past exhibition topics include: the history of wine-making in America, the sugar trade in the Atlantic world, sports played in 19th century America, and the War of 1812.

=== Book Division ===
The Book Division contains approximately 80,000 books, pamphlets, broadsides, and periodicals. Highlights of the collection include books on the discovery and exploration of North America, colonial American imprints, and books and pamphlets of the American Revolution. Expanding beyond the areas of William L. Clements' personal collection, the library also holds books on a variety of subjects such as African American history, education, Native American history, politics, religion, sermons and orations, slavery and anti-slavery, the West Indies, and women's history. The contributions of other collectors, such as the James V. Medler Crime Collection and James S. Schoff Civil War Collection, provide additional subject strengths on certain topics.

=== Manuscripts Division ===
The Manuscripts Division cares for approximately 2,600 collections of letters, documents, diaries, financial records, and other materials, with an emphasis on 18th- and 19th-century North America. The division's strengths include Revolutionary War era British-American colonial and military history; the Civil War; 19th-century social and religious reform movements, especially abolition; African American and Native American history; women's history; education; naval and maritime history; health and medicine; travel; business and commerce; and other topics.

William L. Clements began to collect manuscripts in the early 1920s and, with the library's first director Randolph Adams, acquired many of the cornerstone collections of the manuscripts division, including the papers of British Prime Minister William Petty, 2nd Earl of Shelburne; commanders-in-chief of the Army in North America Thomas Gage and Henry Clinton; abolitionists Angelina Grimké, Sarah Grimké, and Theodore Weld; and others.

=== Map Division ===
The map collection has been assembled to document the expansion of geographical knowledge of the Americas from the 15th through the 19th centuries, with particular emphasis on North American military history, frontier expansion, and the history of cartography itself. The Map Division was established to deal with the numerous maps and plans acquired by Mr. Clements in the 1920s, some with important manuscript collections and others through the purchase of existing map and atlas collections, notably that of Henry Vignaud (1830–1922).

The Map Division holds some 30,000 maps and plans, about 1,500 of which are manuscripts. Many of the latter came to the library with manuscript collections such as the Gage and Clinton papers, which makes the holdings particularly rich in the cartography of the American Revolution. In addition to separate maps, the Clements holds 600 atlases. The map catalog includes all maps in books and atlases.

=== Graphics Division ===
The Graphics Division holds prints, photographs, printed ephemera, original artwork, illustrated and non-illustrated sheet music, and realia.

William L. Clements had a modest collection of portrait prints and a few Revolutionary War cartoons when he founded the library in the 1920s but he showed little interest in visual materials. The current Graphics Division, founded in 2002, is made up mostly of materials acquired over the past 30 years. For sheer numbers, the fastest growing part of the Clements Library has been the photograph collection, with fewer than 100 items in the 1970s, and over 150,000 by 2015.

The subjects represented by the division mirror the subjects of the other Clements divisions with strengths in American military history, political and social histories, American urban and landscape views, portraiture, satire, popular culture, leisure activities, labor, technology, travel, and culinary history. Examples of almost every printing and photographic process used from the 15th to the 20th centuries exists within the collections.

The library has recently acquired the David V. Tinder Collection of Michigan Photography, representing over 100,000 photographs taken from c. 1845–1980 in the state.

Approximate numbers for the division holdings:

- Prints – 9400 items
- Photos – 150,000
- Ephemera – 10,000
- Sheet music – 15,000
- Artwork – 150
- Realia – 100

== Clements Library Associates ==
Clements Library Associates support the library through membership dues and can contribute at several levels, beginning at "Student" with a $5 membership fee. The Associates program was created in 1947; and it is estimated that the members have helped purchase "$5,000,000 worth of historical material that today has a monetary value many times that amount." Associates are invited to attend Clements Library programs, lectures, and exhibits free of cost. Members are regularly informed of happenings and new acquisitions at the Clements through the library's magazine, The Quarto.

== See also ==
- William Wright Abbot – archivist who did extensive work editing and publishing The Washington Papers
- Archive and Archival research
- Peter Force, early American archivist, credited with the biggest collection of archival material from colonial American and the American Revolution
- James Kendall Hosmer American history professor and librarian
