= George Washington Hosmer =

George Washington Hosmer (born in Canton, Massachusetts, in 1804; died there, 5 July 1881) was a United States educator and pastor. He was president of Antioch College from 1866 to 1872. His son, writer James Kendall Hosmer was also a pastor and was a professor at Antioch.

== Biography ==
Hosmer graduated from Harvard in 1826, and from the Harvard Divinity School in 1830. The next two and a half years, he was pastor of the Unitarian church in Northfield, Massachusetts. Beginning in 1835, he was pastor in Buffalo, New York, where he remained until his election to the presidency of Antioch College in Yellow Springs, Ohio, in 1866. While president of Antioch, he was also non-resident professor of divinity in the Unitarian theological school at Meadville, Pennsylvania.

Resigning the presidency of Antioch in 1872, he stayed there as professor of history and ethics. From 1873 until 1879, he was pastor of the Channing Religious Society of Boston, Massachusetts. Hosmer was one of the most noted preachers in the Unitarian church of his day.

== Family ==
His son James Kendall Hosmer was a noted author, pastor and fought on the Union side during the American Civil War.
