= John Fisk =

American radio personality

- Born: John F. Fisk; October 14, 1946; New York, U.S.
- Died: December 24, 2011 (aged 69); New York City, U.S.
- Occupation: American radio personality

John F. Fisk (October 14, 1946 – December 20, 2004) was an American radio personality based in New York City, associated with the Pacifica Foundation's WBAI-FM.

== Early life ==
Born in New York State and raised in Manhattan, Fisk was the eldest son of Maryland native Martha (née Riley) and native Ohioan John F. Fisk IV.

== Career ==
During the 1970s and 1980s Fisk was the host of Digressions, a weekly late-night free form radio show on WBAI.

Fisk also served as broadcast consultant to the Poetry Project at St. Mark's Church for over twenty years, producing broadcasts of Poetry Project readings for WBAI.

== Personal life and death ==
On Monday, December 20, 2004, Fisk died, aged 58 at his home in Manhattan's East Village, following a long battle with bone cancer. A private cremation was held three days later, and a memorial tribute was held the following month at St. Mark's Church.
