= William L. Clements =

American businessman

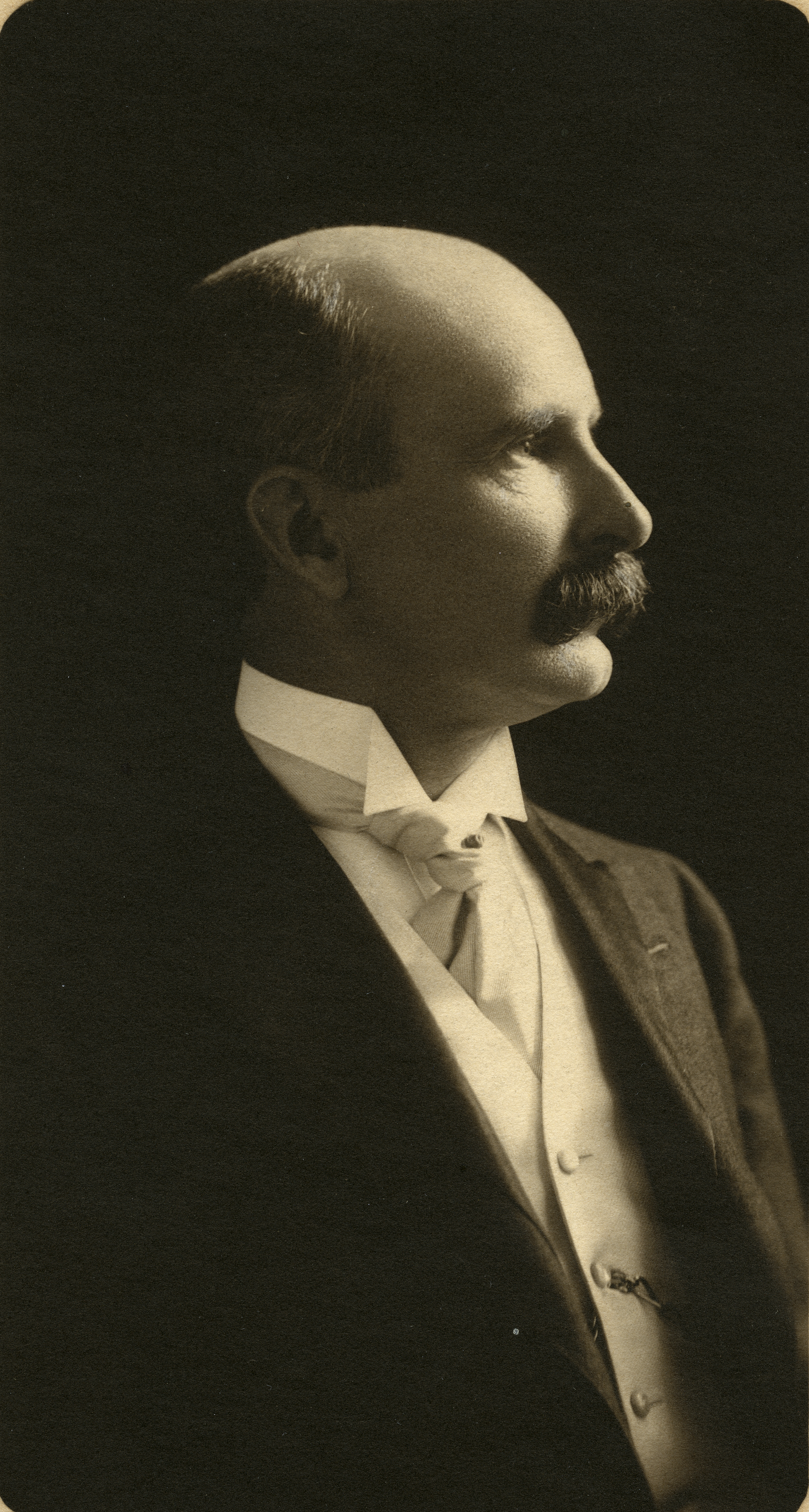
- Portrait of William Clements
- Born: William Lawrence Clements; April 1, 1861; Ann Arbor, Michigan, U.S.
- Died: November 6, 1934 (aged 73); Bay City, Michigan, U.S.
- Resting place: Forest Hill Cemetery, Ann Arbor, Michigan, U.S.
- Education: University of Michigan
- Occupations: Financier, Banker, Engineer
- Known for: Philanthropy
- Political party: Republican Party
- Website: http://clements.umich.edu/

William Lawrence Clements (1861–1934) was an American businessman and collector of historical works; founder, and donor to the William L. Clements Library at the University of Michigan. In addition, Clements donated more than twenty-million-dollars throughout his life to the university, oversaw a successful business career in the manufacturing and banking industry, and served as a regent of the University of Michigan for twenty-four years.

== Early life and schooling ==
William Clements was born in Ann Arbor, Michigan, on April 1, 1861, to James and Agnes (Macready) Clements. His father James was a professor at the University of Michigan during a time of great expansion and as such, young William witnessed the university's early development. James Clements rented the family's State Street home from the university, which existed next to the Michigan Union. William Clements grew up on the Ann Arbor campus and attended the Ann Arbor public schools. He later matriculated into the University of Michigan in the year 1878 when he was 17. He studied Mechanical Engineering through the College of Literature and Arts due to the fact that the engineering college had not yet been created. Clements also joined Chi Psi fraternity, Alpha Epsilon chapter at University of Michigan. Clements graduated with a Bachelor of Science in mechanical engineering and was later bestowed with an honorary doctorate in law (LL.D.) in 1934.

== Family ==
Clements was married on February 7, 1887, in Pittsburgh to Jessie N. Young, a daughter of one of the prominent families of that city. Together they had three children—two sons and a daughter. Their eldest son, Wallace William Clements was born on September 2, 1889, and followed his father's footsteps and graduated from the University of Michigan. Their daughter Elizabeth M. Clements born on September 9, 1891, went on to marry Harry S. Finkenstaedt and lived in Detroit. Their last son, James R. Clements, born on November 2, 1897 died in France while serving in the U.S. Air Force during World War I. William Clements additionally had four grandchildren.

Clements had one sister, Ida (Clements) Wheat, who later lived in Detroit with her husband. The two went on to have one son, a nephew of William who admired him very much and spoke fondly about William at his funeral.

Clements married a second time on April 22, 1931, to Florence Kathryn Fischer and then sailed to and honeymooned for an extended amount of time in Europe shortly before his death.

== Business career ==
Upon his undergraduate graduation in 1882, Clements moved to Bay City, Michigan, to work as an engineer with his father who was also a partner at Bay City Industrial Works (now the Industrial Brownhoist Corporation of Bay City), a business that designed and manufactured hoists, cranes, and steam shovels. Although the business wasn't very successful, Clements worked to improve the efficiency of the products and was awarded several patents for improvements to the railway cranes and steam shovels. In 1886, Clements and an associate bought out the stakeholders, and re-established the business. William Clements eventually became the president of Bay City Industrial Works in 1898. Under his management, Industrial Works became one of the most profitable institutions in Michigan as the company manufactured the construction equipment for the creation of the Panama Canal, and as such the company profits skyrocketed between 1904 and 1915. In addition, Mr. Clements saw a career in the banking industry having served as the president of First National Bank of Bay City. Clements made a fortune throughout his career, which allowed him to fund his personal passion of book collecting.

== Affiliations ==
When Clements was asked what his chief recreation was he simply stated, "book collecting." As such, he was a member of numerous societies that focused on his passion of historical artifacts and books including his appointment to the Michigan Historical Commission by Michigan Governor Fred W. Green on August 29, 1927. Additionally Clements was a member of the American Antiquarian Society, the American History Association, the Club of Odd Volumes in Boston, the Mississippi Valley Historical Association, the New England Historic Genealogical Society, and the Grolier Club.

== Notable collections ==
By the 1890s, Clements started collecting rare books and works of early Americana. Fortunately, Clements was able to make many of his purchases in the “golden age” for collectors as the decades of the 1880s through the 1920s saw the breakup of aristocratic British estates which contained many great libraries. In the United States many large private libraries were also sold which allowed Clements to make a series of major purchases. Among these purchases were the collections of Aaron J. Cooke, a good friend of Clements who sold him over 1,000 volumes of Americana in 1903.

Clements concentrated on two periods of early American history—the colonization of America from the 15th through the 17th centuries and the late 18th century colonial period and revolutionary America. Among some of his notable purchases were Christopher Columbus's letters and reports to the king and queen of Spain describing the first voyage to discover a world that did not then exist on any map. He also purchased John Smith's "True Relation of Virginia," one of the six copies of Thomas Hariot’’s "A Briefe and True Report of Virginia of 1588," and also Jefferson's notes on the State.

Writing of his scope, J. Kevin Graffagnino assessed Clements' book collecting: "William L. Clements stands as one of the great Americana collectors of his or any other generation."

== William L. Clements Library ==
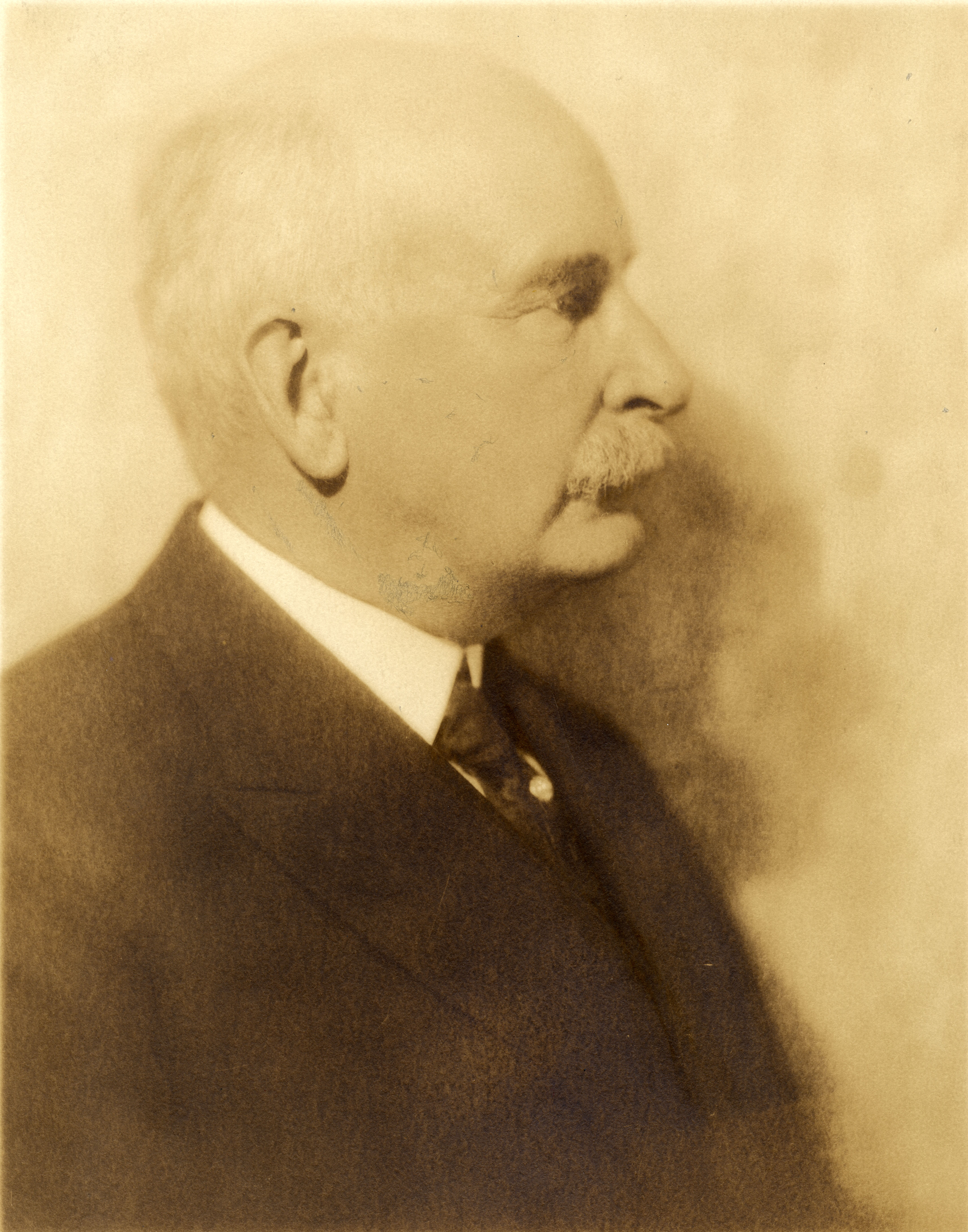
William L. Clements Later in Life

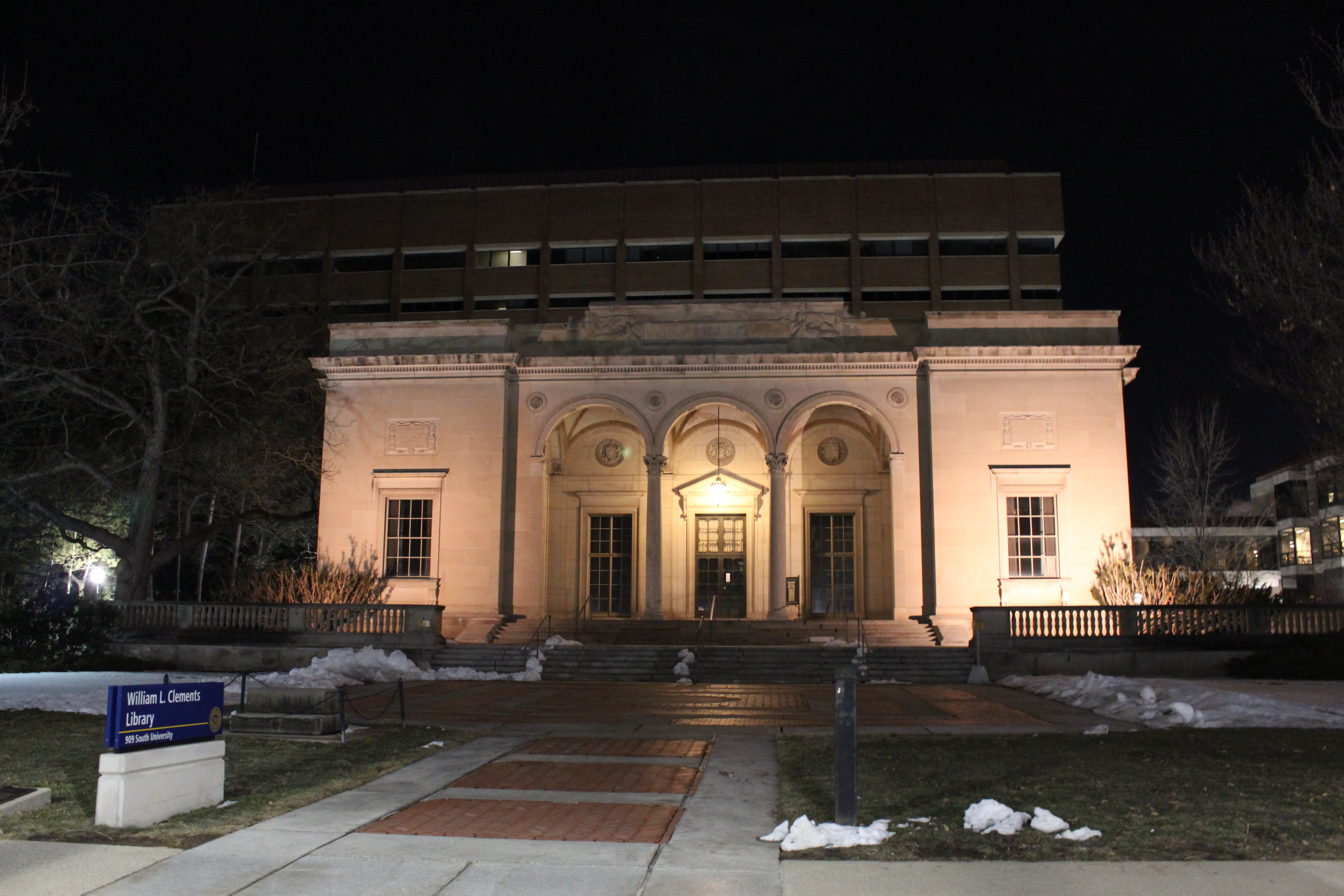
William L. Clements Library, University of Michigan, Ann Arbor, Michigan

In 1921 Clements started donating his collection to the University of Michigan and started plans to build a library to house his collection. Seeing the opportunity to create a memorial for himself, he envisioned this library to be exclusively for him, his close friends, and the advanced scholars and researchers in the country. This library would rival those on the east coast, which belonged to Ivy League schools, and would be a leading source of history in the Midwest. Clements provided a suitable home for his collections in the style of Italian renaissance, based on Vignola's casino for the Villa Farnese in Caprarola, Italy. This building, designed by famous architect Albert Kahn for the cost of $200,000, would also serve as the building Kahn wanted most to be remembered for. The Library was officially dedicated the William L. Clements Library on June 15, 1923, and at the time of its completion had over 20,000 volumes of rare books, 2,000 volumes of early newspapers, and several hundred maps. Between 1925 and 1930, William Clements acquired the papers of British generals Thomas Gage and Sir Henry Clinton, Cabinet Minister Lord George Germain, and the Hessian General Von Jungkenn, creating the largest archive in the United States of manuscripts and maps relating to British conduct of the American War. On the American side of the conflict, Clements purchased the papers of Continental Army General Nathanael Greene, as he believed there was value in examining the history of both sides of conflict, and holding the physical documents created much more intellectual value than a copy. Clements also collected song sheets, newspapers, magazines, cookbooks, sermons, school primers, and slave documents, all of which could be examined together to adequately study the past.

== University of Michigan Board of Regents (1909–1933) ==
Later in his life, Clements was elected to serve as a Regent of the University of Michigan as a Republican succeeding Frank W. Fletcher of Alpena in 1909. Clements was continuously re-elected until his retirement in 1933. Clements enjoyed golfing with his good friend, fellow University of Michigan regent Junius Beal. During his tenure as a regent, his knowledge of engineering and business made him a leader in rebuilding the central campus as part of the "committee of five." This committee, composed of President Burton, Professor John Shepard, Regent Benjamin Hanchett, Albert Kahn, and William Clements, oversaw a great expansion to the Michigan campus after World War I. They were appointed to make decisions of all new buildings on campus, most notably the University of Michigan Hospital, the Simpson Memorial Institute for Medical Research, the Museums Building, the Burton Memorial Carillon Tower, and the Clements Library where he additionally served on the Committee of Management for the remainder of his life.

== Legacy and death ==
Clements died of a heart attack in his home on Tuesday, November 6, 1934. Fellow University of Michigan graduates and Chi Psi Fraternity brothers served as his pallbearers. They were George Duffy, John Fischer, William Davis, Robert Hill, Donald Nichols, and William Oliver. Clements's left an estate of about half a million dollars as well as invaluable books, maps, and manuscripts. He was said to have "Unstinted labor, his broad vision and prudent counsel." Clements is buried at Forest Hill Cemetery in Ann Arbor. The William Clements Library underwent a massive $17.5 million restoration effort beginning in 2015 and reopened in the Spring of 2016.

William L. Clements was awarded American Library Association Honorary Membership in 1933.

Clements was responsible for the 1922 building of the Bay City Public library, "through both personal donations and activities to obtain supplementary funds from the Carnegie Foundation."
