= Bibliography of Benjamin Franklin =

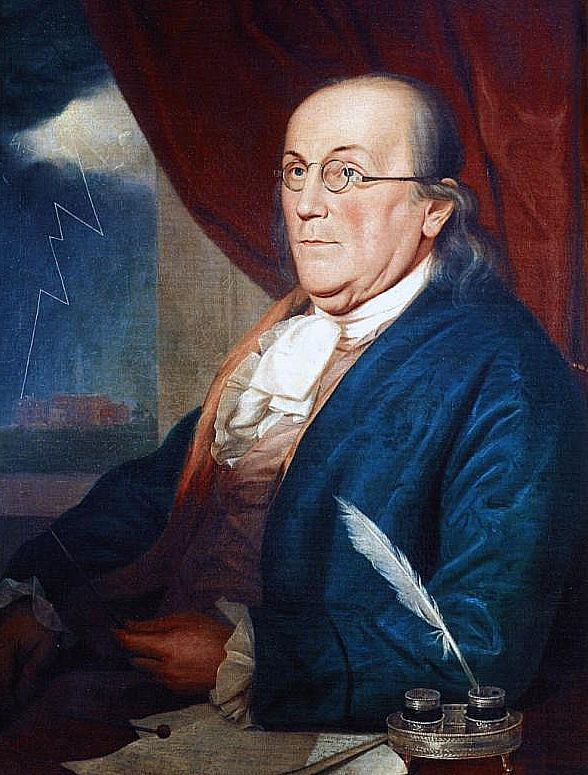
Benjamin Franklin 1706–1790

This is a comprehensive list of primary and secondary works by or about Benjamin Franklin, one of the principal Founding Fathers of the United States. Works about Franklin have been consistently published during and after Franklin's life, spanning four centuries, and continue to appear in present-day publications. Scholarly works that are not necessarily subject-specific to Franklin, yet cover his life and efforts in significant measure, may also be included here. In contrast, this bibliography does not include the numerous encyclopedia articles and short essays about Franklin.

== Biographical ==
=== 18th century ===
- Smith, William (1792). Eulogium on Benjamin Franklin. Philadelphia: Printed by Benjamin Franklin Bache. "delivered March 1, 1791, in the German Lutheran Church of the city of Philadelphia, before the American Philosophical Society"

=== 19th century ===
- Beers, Henry Augustin (1895). Initial studies in American letters. Meadville, Pa., New York, Flood and Vincent.
  Franklin's letter writing covered well in this work
- Bigelow, John (1879). Franklin: a sketch. Boston: Little, Brown & Co.
- —— (1888). Franklin's Home and Host in France. Century Company.
- Chaplin, Jeremiah (1876). The life of Benjamin Franklin. Chicago, Belford, Clarke & company.
- Evans, Edmund (1865). Benjamin Franklin, the printer-boy. Edinburgh: William P. Nimmo.
- Fisher, Sydney George (1899). The true Benjamin Franklin. Philadelphia, J.B. Lippincott Company.
- Ford, Paul Leicester (1899). The many-sided Franklin. New York, The Century co.
- —— (1889). Franklin bibliography. A list of books written by, or relating to Benjamin Franklin. Brooklyn, N. Y..
- Hale, Edward Everett (1888). Franklin in France; from original documents. Boston, Roberts Brothers.
- Hill, George Canning (1888). Benjamin Franklin; a biography. New York: R. Worthington.
- Holley, Orville Luther (1860). The life of Benjamin Franklin. Philadelphia: John E. Potter.
- Morse, John Torrey (1898). Benjamin Franklin. Boston: Houghton Mifflin.
- Parton, James (1864). Life and times of Benjamin Franklin. Vol. I. Ticknor and Fields.
- —— (1864). Life and times of Benjamin Franklin. Vol. II. Ticknor and Fields.
- Robins, Edward (1898). Benjamin Franklin, printer, statesman, philosopher and practical citizen, 1706-1790. New York & London, G. P. Putnam's sons.
- Sparks, Jaared (1877). Benjamin Franklin, "doer of good": a biography. London: W.P. Nimmo.
- Stevens, Henry (1881). Benjamin Franklin's life and writings: a bibliographical essay on the Stevens' collection of books and manuscripts relating to Doctor Franklin. London: Printed by Messrs. Davy & sons.
- Strong, Frank B. (1898). Benjamin Franklin: a character sketch. Milwaukee: H.G. Campbell.
- Thayer, William Makepeace (1864). The printer boy; How Benjamin Franklin made his mark. Boston, J. E. Tilton and company.
- Thayer, William Makepeace (1889). From boyhood to manhood, life of Benjamin Franklin. New York: Hurst.
- Thorpe, Francis Newton (1893). Benjamin Franklin and the University of Pennsylvania. Washington: Government Printing Office.
- Tomkinson, E. M. (1885). Benjamin Franklin. Cassell & Company.
- Weld, Horatio Hastings (1846). The pictorial life of Benjamin Franklin. Philadelphia, Lindsay and Blakiston.
- Weems, Mason Locke (1873). The life of Benjamin Franklin: with many choice anecdotes and admirable sayings. Philadelphia: Uriah Hunt's Sons.
- Wetzel, William Achenbach (1895). Benjamin Franklin as an economist. Baltimore, The Johns Hopkins Press.

=== 20th century ===
- Abbott, George Maurice (1913). A Short History of the Library Company of Philadelphia. Harvard University.
- Amacher, Richard E. (1962). Benjamin Franklin. New York, Twayne Publishers.
- Anderson, Douglas (1997). The radical enlightenmenst of Benjamin Franklin. Baltimore, Md.: Johns Hopkins University Press. ISBN 978-0-8018-5445-3.
- Arbour, Keith (1999). Benjamin Franklin's First Government Printing. American Philosophical Society. ISBN 978-0-8716-9895-7.
- Bache, Richard Meade (1900). Franklin's ceremonial coat. Philadelphia.
- Balestra, Gianfranca (1999). Benjamin Franklin, an American genius. Chicago, Ill.: Open Court. ISBN 978-8-8711-9590-2.
- Barbour, Frances M. (1974). A concordance to the sayings in Franklin's Poor Richard. Detroit: Gale Research Co. ISBN 9780810310094.
- Becker, Carl L. (1946). Benjamin Franklin. Cornell University Press, Ithaca, New York.
- Bell, Whitfield J. (1997). Patriot-improvers: biographical sketches of members of the American Philosophical Society. American Philosophical Society. ISBN 978-0-8716-9226-9.
- Bemis, Samuel Flagg (1924). British Secret Service and the French-American Alliance. Oxford University Press on behalf of the American Historical Association.
- —— (1957). The diplomacy of the American Revolution. Indiana University Press.
- Boorstin, Daniel (1958). The Americans, the colonial experience. New York, Random House.
  Franklin one of the central figures in this work
- Bowen, Catherine Drinker (1974). The most dangerous man in America: scenes from the life of Benjamin Franklin. Boston, Little, Brown. ISBN 978-0-3161-0379-4.
- Bridenbaugh, Carl (1942). Rebels and gentlemen; Philadelphia in the age of Franklin New York, Reynal & Hitchcock. New York, Reynal & Hitchcock.
- Bruce, William Cabell (1917). Benjamin Franklin, self-revealed. New York, London, G. P. Putnam's sons. Benjamin Franklin: Self-Revealed public domain audiobook at LibriVox
- Buffington, Joseph (1912). A recall of Benjamin Franklin. Lancaster, Pa., Press of the New era printing company.
- Butler, John P., ed. (1978). Index, The Papers of the Continental Congress, 1774-1789. National Archives. — A comprehensive index (1466 pages) with hundreds of references to letters to and from Franklin, mostly involving the Continental Congress
- Butler, Ruth Lamham (1928). Doctor Franklin, Postmaster General. Doubleday, Doran, Incorporated. ISBN 9780598736154.
- Buxbaum, Melvin H. (1983). Benjamin Franklin: a reference guide. Vol. I. Boston, Mass.: G.K. Hall.
- —— (1983). Benjamin Franklin: a reference guide. Vol. II. Boston, Mass.: G.K. Hall.
- —— (1987). Critical essays on Benjamin Franklin. Boston, Mass.: G.K. Hall. ISBN 978-0-8161-86990.
- Campbell, James (1999). Recovering Benjamin Franklin: An Exploration of a Life of Science and Service. Open Court Publishing. ISBN 0-8126-9387-6.
- Clapp, Margaret A. (1947). Forgotten First Citizen: John Bigelow. Boston: Little, Brown.
- Clark, Ronald William (1983). Benjamin Franklin: a biography. New York: Random House. ISBN 9780394502229.
- —— (1953). Benjamin Franklin: His Contribution to the American Tradition. Bobbs-merrill Company.
- Corwin, Edward Samuel (1916). French policy and the American Alliance of 1778. Princeton University Press.
- Crane (1954). Benjamin Franklin and a rising people. Boston: Little, Brown.
- Crane, Verner Winslow (1936). Benjamin Franklin, Englishman and American. Williams and Wilkins Company.
- Currey, Cecil B. (1968). Road to Revolution: Benjamin Franklin in England, 1765-1775. Anchor Books.
- —— (1972). Code Number 72/Ben Franklin: Patriot Or Spy?. Prentice-Hall. ISBN 978-0-1313-9493-3.
- Dana, Emma Lilian (1915). Makers of America: Franklin, Washington, Jefferson, Lincoln. New York: Immigrant Publication Society.
- Daugherty, Charles Michael (1965). Benjamin Franklin: scientist-diplomat. New York: Macmillan.
- Davidson, Philip (1941). Propaganda and the American Revolution, 1763-178. University of North Carolina Press.
- Davies, Eryl (1981). Benjamin Franklin: experimenter extraordinary. Hove: Wayland. ISBN 978-0-8534-0825-3.
- Donovan, Frank Robert (1963). The many worlds of Benjamin Franklin: by the editors of American heritage. New York: American Heritage Pub. Co.
- Doren, Carl Van (1948). Benjamin Franklin's Autobiographical Writings. Viking Press.
- Dudley, Edward Lawrence (1915). Benjamin Franklin. Cleveland, Ohio: World Syndicate Pub. Co.
- Dull, Jonathan R. (1985). A diplomatic history of the American Revolution. Yale University Press. ISBN 978-0-3000-3419-6.
  Pictured on the cover, Franklin's diplomatic role is extensively covered in this work
- Eiselen, Malcolm Rogers (1928). Franklin's Political Theories. Doubleday, Doran, Incorporated. ISBN 9780598733009.
- Fay, Bernard (1929). Franklin, the Apostle of Modern Times. Little, Brown. ISBN 9780827423701.
- Fay, Bernard (1933). The two Franklins: fathers of American democracy. St. Clair Shores, Mich., Scholarly Press.
- Fisher, Sydney George (1925). The True Benjamin Franklin. Philadelphia: J. B. Lippincott & Co.
- Fleming, Thomas J. (1972). Benjamin Franklin: a biography in his own words. New York: Newsweek. ISBN 978-0-8822-5033-5.
- Franklin, Phyllis (1969). Show thyself a man. A comparison of Benjamin Franklin and Cotton Mather. The Hague, Paris, Mouton. ISBN 978-3-1110-1370-1.
- Hall, Max (1960). Benjamin Franklin & Polly Baker: the history of a literary deception. University of North Carolina Press. ISBN 978-0-8229-5432-3.
- Hays, Isaac Minis (1904). The chronology of Benjamin Franklin, founder of the American Philosophical Society. Philadelphia: American Philosophical Society.
- Holman, Louis Arthur (1916). Scenes from the life of Benjamin Franklin. Boston, Small, Maynard & company.
- Huang, Nian-Sheng (1994). Benjamin Franklin in American thought and culture, 1790-1990. Philadelphia: American Philosophical Society. ISBN 978-0-8716-9211-5.
- Ketcham, Ralph (1965). Benjamin Franklin. New York, Washington Square Press.
- Kurutz, Gary F. (1980). Fifty Treasures of the California State Library. California State Library.
- Lemay, Joseph A. (1993). Reappraising Benjamin Franklin: A Bicentennial Perspective. University of Delaware Press. ISBN 978-0-8741-3448-3.
- Lopez, Claude-Anne (1990) [1966]. Mon cher papa: Franklin and the ladies of Paris. ISBN 978-0-3000-4758-5.
- Lopez, Claude-Anne; Herbert, Eugenia W. (1985). The Private Franklin: The Man and His Family. W. W. Norton. ISBN 978-0-3933-0227-1.
- Major, Clare Tree (1922). The story of Benjamin Franklin. New York, N.Y., Newark, N.J., Barse & Hopkins.
- McKown, Robin (1963). Benjamin Franklin. Benjamin Franklin public domain audiobook at LibriVox
- Meadowcroft, Enid La Monte; Wilson, Edward Arthur (1952). The story of Benjamin Franklin. New York, Grosset & Dunlap.
- Meltzer, Milton (1988). Benjamin Franklin: the new American. ISBN 978-0-5311-0582-5.
- Middlekauff, Robert (1996). Benjamin Franklin and his enemies. Berkeley: University of California Press. ISBN 978-0-5202-1378-4.
- More, Paul Elmer (1900). Benjamin Franklin. New York: Houghton, Mifflin.
- Morgan, David T. (1999). The Devious Dr. Franklin, Colonial Agent: Benjamin Franklin's Years in London. Mercer University Press. ISBN 978-0-8655-4674-5.
- Pepper, William, M.D. (1911). The medical side of Benjamin Franklin. Philadelphia: William J. Campbell.
- Sanford, Charles L., ed. (1955). Benjamin Franklin and the American character. Boston: D.C. Heath and Company.
- Sayre, Robert F. (1958). The Examined Self: Benjamin Franklin, Henry Adams, Henry James. University of Wisconsin Press. ISBN 9780299116408.
- Schaeper, Thomas J. (1995). France and America in the Revolutionary Era. Berghahn Books. ISBN 978-1-5718-1050-2.
  Covers Franklin's diplomatic role in France extensively
- Schoenbrun, David (1976). Triumph in Paris: the exploits of Benjamin Franklin. New York: Harper & Row. ISBN 978-0-0601-3854-7.
- Schofield, Robert E. (1997). The enlightenment of Joseph Priestley: a study of his life and work from 1733 to 1773. University Park, Pa.: Pennsylvania State University Press. ISBN 978-0-2710-1662-7.
  (Covers Franklin's involvement with Priestly regarding electrical experiments and the English enlightenment)
- Scudder, Evarts Seelye (1939). Benjamin Franklin, a biography. London, Collins.
- Skemp, Sheila L. (1994). Benjamin and William Franklin: father and son, patriot and loyalist. Boston: Bedford Books of St. Martin's Press. ISBN 978-0-3120-86176.
- Sherman, Stuart Pratt (1922). Americans: Franklin and the Age of Enlightenment, Chapter III. New York, C. Scribner's sons.
- Smith, Jeffery Alan (1990). Franklin and Bache: envisioning the enlightened republic. New York: Oxford University Press. ISBN 978-0-1950-5676-1.
- Stinchcombe, William C. (1969). The American Revolution and the French alliance. Syracuse University Press. ISBN 978-0-8156-2134-8.
  Franklin's diplomatic role is well covered in this work
- Smythe, J. Henry (1929). The Amazing Benjamin Franklin. Frederick A. Stokes Company.
- Stephens, BradPhiladelphia, Dill & Collins, co. (1923). The pictorial life of Benjamin Franklin, printer, typefounder, ink maker, bookbinder, copperplate engraver and printer ... Philadelphia, Dill & Collins, co.
- Stewart, Gail B. (1992). The importance of Benjamin Franklin. Lucent Books. ISBN 978-1-5600-60260.
- Stifler, James Madison (1925). The religion of Benjamin Franklin. New York, London, D. Appleton and Company.
- Stourzh, Gerald (1954). Benjamin Franklin and American foreign policy. University of Chicago Press.
- Swenson, Virginia (1981). The Power of Industry: Featuring the Story of Benjamin Franklin. Eagle Systems International. ISBN 978-0-9117-1288-9.
- Swift, Lindsay (1910). Benjamin Franklin. Boston, Small, Maynard & company.
- Thayer, William Makepeace (1905). Benjamin Franklin, or, From printing office to the court of St. James. London, Hodder and Stoughton.
- Tolles, Frederick Barnes (1953). Franklin and the Pulteney Mission: An Episode in the Secret History of the American Revolution. University of Pennsylvania Press.
- Tottle, John (1958). Benjamin Franklin. Houghton Mifflin. ISBN 9780395017487.
- Tottle, John (1958). Benjamin Franklin: First Great American. Houghton Mifflin.
- Tourtellot, Arthur Bernon (1977). Benjamin Franklin: the shaping of genius: the Boston Years. Garden City, N.Y.: Doubleday. ISBN 0-38503230-7.
- Turzak, Florence (1935). Benjamin Franklin. A Biography in Woodcuts. New York.
- Van Doren, Carl (1920). Benjamin Franklin and Jonathan Edwards selections from their writings. Charles Scribner's sons, New York, Chicago, Boston.
- —— (1938). Benjamin Franklin. New York, Garden City Publishing Company. (Also published in 1948, 1966, 1987 and 1991)
- Victory, Beatrice Marguerite (1915). Benjamin Franklin and Germany. University of Pennsylvania.
- Walters, Kerry S. (1999). Benjamin Franklin and His Gods. University of Illinois Press. ISBN 978-0-2520-6739-6.
- Wechsler, Louis K (1976). Benjamin Franklin: American and world educator. Boston: Twayne Publishers. ISBN 978-0-8057-7667-6.
- Whipple, Wayne (1910). Franklin's key. Philadelphia, Franklin printing co.
- —— (1916). The story of young Benjamin Franklin. Philadelphia, Henry Altemus company.
- Wilson, Mitchell A. (1960). American Science and Invention, a Pictorial History: The Fabulous Story of how American Dreamers, Wizards, and Inspired Tinkerers Converted a Wilderness Into the Wonder of the World. Bonanza Books.
- Wise, Winifred Esther (1970). Benjamin Franklin. Putnam.
- Woodward, Carl Raymond (1942). Benjamin Franklin - Adventures in Agriculture. Franklin Institute.

=== 21st century ===
- Aldridge, Alfred Owen (2018). Franklin and His French Contemporaries. Creative Media Partners. ISBN 978-1-3792-7534-3.
- Allison, Andrew M. (1982). The Real Benjamin Franklin: The True Story of America's Greatest Diplomat. Salt Lake City, Utah: Freemen Institute. ISBN 978-0-8808-0001-3..
- Anderson, Douglas (2012). The Unfinished Life of Benjamin Franklin. Baltimore: The Johns Hopkins University Press. ISBN 978-1-4214-0523-0.
- Benge, Janet; Benge, Geoff (2005). Benjamin Franklin: Live Wire. YWAM Publishing. ISBN 978-1-932096-14-9.
- Bernstein, Richard B. (2011) [2009]. The Founding Fathers Reconsidered. Oxford; New York: Oxford University Press. doi:10.1093/acprof:osobl/9780199832576.001.0001. ISBN 978-0-19-983257-6.
  (Many references to Franklin throughout the work)
- Block, Seymour Stanton (2004). Benjamin Franklin, genius of kites, flights and voting rights. Jefferson, N.C.: McFarland & Co. ISBN 978-0-7864-8024-1.
- Bloom, Harold (2008). Benjamin Franklin. New York: Blooms Literary Criticism. ISBN 978-1-6041-3135-2.
- Brands, H. W. (2000). The First American: The Life and Times of Benjamin Franklin. ISBN 978-0-385-49540-0.
- Bunker, Nick (2019). Young Benjamin Franklin: The Birth of Ingenuity. Knopf Doubleday Publishing Group. ISBN 978-1-1018-7280-2.
- Chaplin, Joyce E. (2006). The first scientific American: Benjamin Franklin and the pursuit of genius. New York, NY: Basic Books. ISBN 978-0-4650-0955-8.
- Daugherty, James (2000). Poor Richard. Beautiful Feet Books. ISBN 978-1-8931-0303-0.
- Downes, Paul (2002). Democracy, revolution, and monarchism in early American literature. Cambridge, UK; New York: Cambridge University Press. ISBN 978-0-5218-1339-6. — Numerous references to Franklin throughout the work, with much commentary on works like Poor Richard, etc.
- Ellis, Joseph (2002). Founding brothers: the revolutionary generation. New York, N.Y.: Vintage Books. ISBN 978-0-3757-0524-3.
  Covers Franklin's role among the Founding Fathers and the founding of the American nation
- Finger, Stanley (2006). Doctor Franklin's medicine. Philadelphia: University of Pennsylvania Press. ISBN 978-0-8122-0191-8.
- Flavell, Julie (2010). When London was capital of America. New Haven: Yale University Press. ISBN 978-0-3001-3739-2. — Numerous references to Franklin while in England throughout this work
- Fleming, Thomas J. (2007). Benjamin Franklin: inventing America. New York: Sterling Pub. ISBN 978-1-4027-4523-2.
- Gaustad, Edwin S. (2008). Benjamin Franklin. Oxford University Press. ISBN 978-0-1953-6870-3.
- Goodwin, George (2016). Benjamin Franklin in London: The British Life of America's Founding Father. Yale University Press. ISBN 978-0-3002-2294-4.
- Hart, D. G. (2021). Benjamin Franklin: Cultural Protestant. Oxford University Press. ISBN 978-0-1910-9340-1.
- Houston, Alan Craig (2008). Benjamin Franklin and the politics of improvement. New Haven: Yale University Press. ISBN 978-0-3001-5239-5.
- Haugen, Brenda (2005). Benjamin Franklin: Scientist and Statesman. Capstone. ISBN 978-0-7565-0826-5.
- Isaacson, Walter (2004). Benjamin Franklin: An American Life. New York: Simon & Schuster. ISBN 978-0-6848-07614.
- Kerry, Paul E.; Holland, Matthew S. (2012). Benjamin Franklin's Intellectual World. Fairleigh Dickinson. ISBN 978-1-6114-7029-1.
- Kidd, Thomas S. (2017). Benjamin Franklin: The Religious Life of a Founding Father. Yale University Press. ISBN 978-0-3002-17490.
- Krensky, Stephen (2008). Benjamin Franklin. New York.: DK Pub. ISBN 978-0-7566-3528-2.
- Lee, Tanja (2002). Benjamin Franklin. San Diego, CA: Greenhaven Press.
- Lemay, J. A. Leo (2009). The Life of Benjamin Franklin. Vol. I Soldier, Scientist, and Politician, 1748–1757. University of Pennsylvania Press. ISBN 978-0-8122-4121-1.
- —— (2006). The Life of Benjamin Franklin. Vol. II Soldier, Scientist, and Politician, 1748–1757. University of Pennsylvania Press. ISBN 978-0-8122-4121-1.
- —— (2009). The Life of Benjamin Franklin. Vol. III Soldier, Scientist, and Politician, 1748–1757. University of Pennsylvania Press. ISBN 978-0-8122-4121-1.
- Mulford, Carla (2008). The Cambridge companion to Benjamin Franklin. Cambridge University Press. ISBN 978-0-5218-71341.
- Morgan, Edmund Sears (2003). Benjamin Franklin. Yale University Press. ISBN 978-0-300-10162-1.
- Franklin, Benjamin (2007). Morgan, Edmund Sears (ed.). Not your usual founding father: selected readings from Benjamin Franklin. New Haven, Conn.; London: Yale University Press.
- Mulford, Carla J. (2015). Benjamin Franklin and the Ends of Empire. Oxford University Press. ISBN 978-0-1993-8420-4.
- Murrey, Christopher J. (2002). Benjamin Franklin: biographical overview and bibliography. New York: Nova Science Publishers. ISBN 978-1-5903-3384-6.
- Olson, Lester C. (2004). Benjamin Franklin's vision of American community: a study in rhetorical iconology. Columbia: University of South Carolina Press. ISBN 978-1-5700-3525-8.
- Pancek, William (2004). Benjamin Franklin, Trickster. Digital Commons @ Trinity.
- Pangle, Lorraine Smith (2007). The political philosophy of Benjamin Franklin. Baltimore: Johns Hopkins University Press. ISBN 978-0-8018-79319.
- Purvis, Thomas L. (May 14, 2014). Colonial America To 1763. Infobase Publishing. ISBN 978-1-4381-0799-8.
- Rosenberg, Gary D. (2009). The Revolution in Geology from the Renaissance to the Enlightenment. Geological Society of America. ISBN 978-0-8137-1203-1.
- Schaeper, Thomas J. (2011). Edward Bancroft: scientist, author, spy. New Haven: Yale University Press. ISBN 978-0-3001-7171-6.
  (Bancroft, a British spy in France, worked in close association with Franklin who is referred to extensively throughout this work)
- Schiff, Stacy (2005). A Great Improvisation: Franklin, France, and the Birth of America. Thorndike Press. ISBN 978-1-4299-0799-6.
- Streissguth, Thomas (2005) [1958]. Benjamin Franklin. Minneapolis, Minn.: Lerner Publications. ISBN 0822522101.
- Strodes, James (2002). Franklin: the essential founding father. Washington DC: Regnery Pub. ISBN 978-0-8952-6163-2.
- Tucker, Tom (2003). Bolt of fate: Benjamin Franklin and his electric kite hoax. New York: Public Affairs. ISBN 978-1-8916-2070-6.
- Waldstreicher, David (2004). Runaway America: Benjamin Franklin, slavery, and the American Revolution. ISBN 978-0-8090-8315-2.
- Waldstreicher, David (2011). A Companion to Benjamin Franklin. Wiley. ISBN 978-1-4443-4212-3.
- Walters, Kerry S. (2011). Revolutionary deists: early America's rational infidels. Amherst, N.Y.: Prometheus Books. ISBN 978-1-6161-4190-5.
  Franklin is the central figure throughout this work
- Wolf, Edwin; Hayes, Kevin J. (2006). The Library of Benjamin Franklin. American Philosophical Society. ISBN 978-0-8716-9257-3.
- Wood, Gordon S. (2004). The Americanization of Benjamin Franklin. New York: Penguin Press. ISBN 978-0-1430-3528-2.
- Wright, Esmond (1970). Benjamin Franklin: a profile. New York: Hill and Wang. ISBN 0809046571.
- Wright, Esmond (1986). Franklin of Philadelphia. Cambridge, Massachusetts: Harvard University Press. ISBN 978-0-6743-18090.
- York, Neil (September 2009). "When Words Fail: William Pitt, Benjamin Franklin and the Imperial Crisis of 1766". Parliamentary History. 28 (3). John Wiley & Sons: 341–374. doi:10.1111/j.1750-0206.2009.00120.x.
- Zall, Paul M. (2005). Benjamin Franklin's humor. Lexington: University Press of Kentucky. ISBN 978-0-8131-7186-9.

== Historical journals ==
=== 20th-century ===
- Abbe, Cleveland (September 1906). "Benjamin Franklin as Meteorologist". Proceedings of the American Philosophical Society. 45 (183). American Philosophical Society: 117–128. JSTOR 983821.
- Allan, D. G. C. (September 2000). ""Dear and Serviceable to Each Other": Benjamin Franklin and the Royal Society of Arts". Proceedings of the American Philosophical Society. 144 (3). American Philosophical Society: 245–266. JSTOR 1515588.
- Baldwin, Ernest H. (1902). "Joseph Galloway, the Loyalist Politician". The Pennsylvania Magazine of History and Biography. 26 (2). University of Pennsylvania Press: 161–191. JSTOR 20086024. — Covers the relationship between Franklin and Galloway extensively
- —— (1902). "Joseph Galloway, the Loyalist Politician, concluded". The Pennsylvania Magazine of History and Biography. 26 (4). University of Pennsylvania Press: 417–442. JSTOR /20086051. — Covers the relationship between Franklin and Galloway extensively
- Bell, Whitfield Jr. (1980). "Leonard Woods Labaree". Proceedings of the Massachusetts Historical Society. 92. Massachusetts Historical Society: 156–160. JSTOR 25080876.
- Bemis, Samuel Flagg (April 1924). "British Secret Service and the French-American Alliance". The American Historical Review. 29 (3). Oxford University Press on behalf of the American Historical Association: 474–495. doi:10.2307/1836521. JSTOR 1836521.
- Buranelli, Vincent (July 1959). "Colonial Philosophy". The William and Mary Quarterly. 16 (3). Omohundro Institute of Early American History and Culture: 343–362. doi:10.2307/1916949. JSTOR 1916949. "No history of colonial philosophy could possibly be complete without Franklin."
- Campbell, James (Fall 1995). "The Pragmatism of Benjamin Franklin". Transactions of the Charles S. Peirce Society. 31 (4). Indiana University Press: 745–792. JSTOR 40320571.
- Dull, Jonathan R. (1982). "Franklin the Diplomat: The French Mission". Transactions of the American Philosophical Society. 72 (1). American Philosophical Society: 1–76. doi:10.2307/1006441. JSTOR 1006441.
- —— (August 1983). "Benjamin Franklin and the Nature of American Diplomacy". The International History Review. 5 (3). Taylor & Francis, Ltd.: 246–363. doi:10.1080/07075332.1983.9640319. JSTOR 40105314.
- Eliot, Thomas D. (March 1924). "The Relations between Adam Smith and Benjamin Franklin before 1776". Political Science Quarterly. 39 (1). The Academy of Political Science: 67–96. doi:10.2307/2142684. JSTOR 2142684.
- Greene, Jack P. (January 1976). "The alienation of Benjamin Franklin - British American". Journal of the Royal Society of Arts. 124 (5234). Royal Society of Arts: 52–73. JSTOR 41372264.
- Jones, R. V. (January 1977). "Benjamin Franklin". Notes and Records of the Royal Society of London. 31 (2). Royal Society: 201–225. doi:10.1098/rsnr.1977.0013. JSTOR 531827. S2CID 202575276.
- Knollenberg, Bernhard (July 1951). "Benjamin Franklin and Yale". The Yale University Library Gazette. 26 (1). Yale University, acting through the Yale University Library: 22–27. JSTOR 40857520.
- Korty, Margaret Barton (1965). "Benjamin Franklin and Eighteenth-Century American Libraries". Transactions of the American Philosophical Society. 55 (9). American Philosophical Society: 1–83. doi:10.2307/1006049. JSTOR 1006049.
- Labaree, Leonard W.; Bell Jr., Whitfield J. (December 19, 1957). "The Papers of Benjamin Franklin: A Progress Report". Proceedings of the American Philosophical Society. 101 (6). American Philosophical Society: 532–534. JSTOR 985521.
- Larson, David M. (April 1986). "Benevolent Persuasion: The Art of Benjamin Franklin's Philanthropic Papers". The Pennsylvania Magazine of History and Biography. 110 (2). University of Pennsylvania Press: 195–217. JSTOR 20091995.
- Lingelbach, William E. (December 1955). "Benjamin Franklin's Papers and the American Philosophical Society". Proceedings of the American Philosophical Society. 99 (6). American Philosophical Society: 359–380. JSTOR 3143918.
- —— (August 31, 1956). "Benjamin Franklin and the American Philosophical Society in 1956". Proceedings of the American Philosophical Society. 100 (4). American Philosophical Society: 354–368. JSTOR 3143765.
- Malone, Kemp (November 1925). "Benjamin Franklin on Spelling Reform". American Speech. 1 (2). Duke University Press: 96–100. doi:10.2307/452554. JSTOR 452554.
- Maestro, Marcello (July–September 1975). "Benjamin Franklin and the Penal Laws". Journal of the History of Ideas. 36 (3). University of Pennsylvania Press: 551–562. doi:10.2307/2708664. JSTOR 2708664.
- Mathews, L. K. (August 1914). "Benjamin Franklin's Plans for a Colonial Union, 1750-1775". The American Political Science Review. 8 (3). American Political Science Association: 393–412. doi:10.2307/1946173. JSTOR 1946173. S2CID 147320261.
- McCoy, Drew R. (October 1978). "Benjamin Franklin's Vision of a Republican Political Economy for America". The William and Mary Quarterly. 35 (4). Omohundro Institute of Early American History and Culture: 605–628. doi:10.2307/1923207. JSTOR 1923207.
- Morgan, David T. (Summer 1984). "A New Look at Benjamin Franklin as Georgia's Colonial Agent". The Georgia Historical Quarterly. 68 (2). Georgia Historical Society: 221–232. JSTOR 40581223.
- "The Commissions of Georgia to Benjamin Franklin to act as colonial agent". The Georgia Historical Quarterly. 2 (3). Georgia Historical Society: 150–164. September 1918. JSTOR 40575589.
- Pace, Antonio (June 1950). "Benjamin Franklin and Italy since the Eighteenth Century". Proceedings of the American Philosophical Society. 94 (3). American Philosophical Society: 242–250. JSTOR 3143557.
- Pierson, George W. (December 1980). "In Memoriam: Leonard Woods Labaree (1897-1980)". The New England Quarterly. 53 (4): 544–546. JSTOR 365496.
- Philbrick, Francis S. (October 1953). "Notes on Early Editions and Editors of Franklin". Proceedings of the American Philosophical Society. 97 (5). American Philosophical Society: 524–564. JSTOR 3149269.
- Read, Conyers (July 1940). "The English Elements in Benjamin Franklin". The Pennsylvania Magazine of History and Biography. 64 (3). University of Pennsylvania Press: 314–330. JSTOR 20087299.
- Reynolds, David S. (Spring 1998). "Walt Whitman: Benjamin Franklin's Representative Man". Modern Language Studies. 28 (2): 29–39. doi:10.2307/3195297. JSTOR 3195297.
- McCoy, Drew R. (October 1978). "Benjamin Franklin's Vision of a Republican Political Economy for America". The William and Mary Quarterly. 34 (4). Omohundro Institute of Early American History and Culture: 605–628. doi:10.2307/1923207. JSTOR 1923207.
- Ross, Earle D. (February 1929). "Benjamin Franklin as an Eighteenth-Century Agricultural Leader". Journal of Political Economy. 37 (1). The University of Chicago Press: 52–72. doi:10.1086/253996. JSTOR 1822320. S2CID 153895640.
- Rossiter, Clinton (July 1952). "The Political Theory of Benjamin Franklin". The Pennsylvania Magazine of History and Biography. 78 (3). University of Pennsylvania Press: 259–293. JSTOR 20088376.
- Schiller, Andrew (December 1958). "Franklin as a Music Critic". The New England Quarterly. 31 (4). The New England Quarterly, Inc.: 504–514. doi:10.2307/362382. JSTOR 362382.
- Shelling, Richard I. (July 1939). "Benjamin Franklin and the Dr. Bray Associates". The Pennsylvania Magazine of History and Biography. 63 (3). University of Pennsylvania Press: 382–293. JSTOR 20087193.
- Skemp, Sheila L. (April 1885). "William Franklin: His Father's Son". The Pennsylvania Magazine of History and Biography. 109 (2). University of Pennsylvania Press: 145–178. JSTOR 20091919.
- Steiner, Prudence L. (June 1987). "Benjamin Franklin's Biblical Hoaxes". Proceedings of the American Philosophical Society. 133 (2). American Philosophical Society: 183–196. JSTOR 986791.
- Spiller, Robert E. (August 1956). "Franklin on the Art of Being Human". Proceedings of the American Philosophical Society. 100 (4). American Philosophical Society: 304–315. JSTOR 3143756.
- Wecter, Dixon (May 1940). "Francis Hopkinson and Benjamin Franklin". American Literature. 12 (2). Duke University Press: 200–217. doi:10.2307/2920477. JSTOR 2920477.
- Wecter, Dixon (January 1941). "Benjamin Franklin and an Irish "Enthusiast"". Huntington Library Quarterly. 4 (2). University of Pennsylvania Press: 205–234. doi:10.2307/3815849. JSTOR 3815849.
- Weintraub, Karl J (July 1976). "The Puritan Ethic and Benjamin Franklin". The Journal of Religion. 58 (3). The University of Chicago Press: 223–237. doi:10.1086/486491. JSTOR 1201929. S2CID 170904007.
- Weisberger, R. William (July 1986). "Benjamin Franklin: A Masonic Enlightener in Paris". Pennsylvania History: A Journal of Mid-Atlantic Studies. 53 (3). Penn State University Press: 165–180. JSTOR 27773110.
- Woodburn, James A. (September 1934). "Benjamin Franklin and the Peace Treaty of 1783". Indiana Magazine of History. 30 (3). Indiana University Press: 223–237. JSTOR 27786674.

=== 21st-century ===
- Atiyah, Michael (December 2006). "Benjamin Franklin and the Edinburgh Enlightenment". Proceedings of the American Philosophical Society. 150 (4). American Philosophical Society: 591–606. JSTOR 4599027.
- Heilbron, J. L. (September 2007). "Benjamin Franklin in Europe: Electrician, Academician, Politician". Notes and Records of the Royal Society of London. 61 (3). Royal Society: 353–373. doi:10.1098/rsnr.2007.0021. JSTOR 20462640. S2CID 145783155.
- Kulikoff, Allan (Summer 2014). "Silence Dogood and the Leather-Apron Men". Pennsylvania History: A Journal of Mid-Atlantic Studies. 81 (3). Penn State University Press: 364–374. doi:10.5325/pennhistory.81.3.0364. JSTOR 10.5325/pennhistory.81.3.0364. S2CID 159476610.
- Meyers, Terry L. (December 2010). "Benjamin Franklin, the College of William and Mary, and the Williamsburg Bray School". Anglican and Episcopal History. 79 (4). Historical Society of the Episcopal Church: 368–393. JSTOR 42612683.
- Prince, Sue Ann; Blumberg, Baruch S.; Gordin, Michael D.; Marrese, Michelle Lamarche; Levitt, Marcus C.; Duval, Karen; Woronzoff-Dashkoff, Alexander; Dolgova, Svetlana Romanova; Cross, Anthony; Stolbova, Elena Igorevna (2006). Price, Sue Ann (ed.). "The Princess & the Patriot: Ekaterina Dashkova, Benjamin Franklin, and the Age of Enlightenment". Transactions of the American Philosophical Society. 96 (1). American Philosophical Society: i–v, vii–viii, xv–xix, 1–67, 69, 71–77, 79–129. doi:10.2307/20020395. JSTOR 20020395.
- Nash, Gary B. (December 2006). "Franklin and Slavery". Proceedings of the American Philosophical Society. 150 (4). American Philosophical Society: 618–638. JSTOR 4599029.
- Newman, Simon P. (August 2009). "Benjamin Franklin and the Leather-Apron Men: The Politics of Class in Eighteenth-Century Philadelphia". Journal of American Studies. 43 (2). Cambridge University Press: 161–175. doi:10.1017/S0021875809990089. JSTOR 40464376. S2CID 145495587.
- Rosenthal, Karen M. (2016). "A Generative Populace: Benjamin Franklin's Economic Agendas". Early American Literature. 41 (3). University of North Carolina Press: 571–598. doi:10.1353/eal.2016.0047. JSTOR 90000884. S2CID 164699680.
- Slack, Kevin (October 2013). "On the Origins and Intention of Benjamin Franklin's "On the Providence of God in the Government of the World"". The Pennsylvania Magazine of History and Biography. 137 (4). University of Pennsylvania Press: 345–379. doi:10.5215/pennmaghistbio.137.4.0345. JSTOR 10.5215/pennmaghistbio.137.4.0345. S2CID 148032085.
- Waligore, Joseph (January 2016). "The Christian Deist Writings of Benjamin Franklin". The Pennsylvania Magazine of History and Biography. 140 (1). University of Pennsylvania Press: 7–29. doi:10.5215/pennmaghistbio.140.1.0007. JSTOR 10.5215/pennmaghistbio.140.1.0007. S2CID 148846618.
- Weinberger, Jerry (2008). "Benjamin Franklin: Philosopher of Progress". The Good Society. 17 (1). Penn State University Press: 20–25. doi:10.2307/20711278. JSTOR 20711278.

== Letters and writings ==
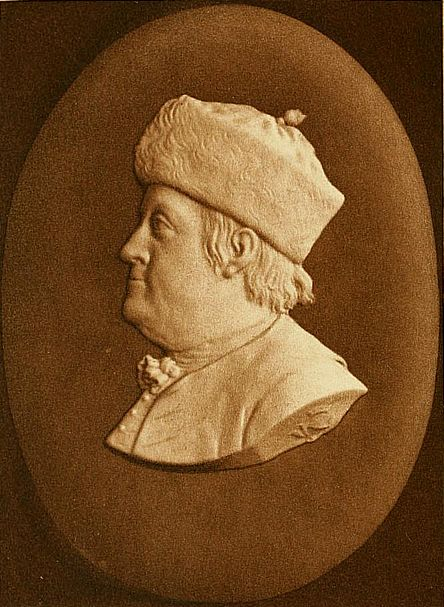
Cameo Medallion of Benjamin Franklin, Presented to The American Philosophical Society, by Sir George Darwin, April 18, 1906. Printed in the several volumes of Calendar of the papers of Benjamin Franklin

During Franklin's lifetime he corresponded with hundreds of people, especially during the revolutionary era. Historian Carl Becker says of Franklin that he "was acquainted personally or through correspondence with more men of eminence in letters, science and politics than any other man of his time".

- Franklin, Benjamin (1904). Bigelow, John (ed.). The works of Benjamin Franklin: including...scientific correspondence...and Autobiography. Vol. I. New York; London: G.P. Putnam's Sons, The Knickerbocker Press.
- —— (1904) [1836–1840]. —— (ed.). The works of Benjamin Franklin: including...scientific correspondence...and Autobiography. Vol. II. New York; London: G.P. Putnam's Sons, The Knickerbocker Press.
- —— (1904) [1836–1840]. —— (ed.). The works of Benjamin Franklin: including...scientific correspondence...and Autobiography. Vol. III. New York; London: G.P. Putnam's Sons, The Knickerbocker Press.
- —— (1904) [1836–1840]. —— (ed.). The works of Benjamin Franklin: including...scientific correspondence...and Autobiography. Vol. IV. New York; London: G.P. Putnam's Sons, The Knickerbocker Press.
- —— (1904) [1836–1840]. —— (ed.). The works of Benjamin Franklin: including...scientific correspondence...and Autobiography. Vol. VI. New York; London: G.P. Putnam's Sons, The Knickerbocker Press.
- —— (1904) [1836–1840]. —— (ed.). The works of Benjamin Franklin: including...scientific correspondence...and Autobiography. Vol. VII. New York; London: G.P. Putnam's Sons, The Knickerbocker Press.
- —— (1904) [1836–1840]. —— (ed.). The works of Benjamin Franklin: including...scientific correspondence...and Autobiography. Vol. VIII. New York; London: G.P. Putnam's Sons, The Knickerbocker Press.
- —— (1904) [1836–1840]. —— (ed.). The works of Benjamin Franklin: including...scientific correspondence...and Autobiography. Vol. IX. New York; London: G.P. Putnam's Sons, The Knickerbocker Press.
- —— (1904) [1836–1840]. —— (ed.). The works of Benjamin Franklin: including...scientific correspondence...and Autobiography. Vol. XII. New York; London: G.P. Putnam's Sons, The Knickerbocker Press.
- Hays, I. Minis, ed. (1908). Calendar of the papers of Benjamin Franklin in the library of the American Philosophical Society. Vol. I. Philadelphia, Printed for the American Philosophical Society.
- ——, ed. (1908). Calendar of the papers of Benjamin Franklin in the library of the American Philosophical Society. Vol. II. Philadelphia, Printed for the American Philosophical Society.
- ——, ed. (1908). Calendar of the papers of Benjamin Franklin in the library of the American Philosophical Society. Vol. III. Philadelphia, Printed for the American Philosophical Society.
- ——, ed. (1908). Calendar of the papers of Benjamin Franklin in the library of the American Philosophical Society. Vol. IV. Philadelphia, Printed for the American Philosophical Society.
- ——, ed. (1908). Calendar of the papers of Benjamin Franklin in the library of the American Philosophical Society. Vol. V. Philadelphia, Printed for the American Philosophical Society.
- ——, ed. (1908). Calendar of the papers of Benjamin Franklin in the library of the University of Pennsylvania. Vol. Appendix. Philadelphia, University of Pennsylvania.
- Franklin, Benjamin (1811). The complete works, in philosophy, politics and morals of the late Dr. Benjamin Franklin. Vol. I. London: Printed for Longman, Hurst, Rees, Orme, and Brown ..
- —— (1811). The complete works, in philosophy, politics and morals of the late Dr. Benjamin Franklin. Vol. II. London: Printed for Longman, Hurst, Rees, Orme, and Brown ..
- —— (1909). MacDonald, Will (ed.). Memoirs of the life & writings of Benjamin Franklin (autobiography). London: J. M. Dent; New York: E. P. Dutton.
- —— (2003). Quotations of Benjamin Franklin. Bedford, Massachusetts: Applewood Books. ISBN 978-1-5570-99389.
- Timothy, Peter (1935). Letters of Peter Timothy, Printer of Charleston, South Carolina, to Benjamin Franklin. Black Cat Press.

=== Works about Franklin's papers ===
- Bell, Whitfield J. (January 1955). "Franklin Papers and the Papers of Benjamin Franklin". Pennsylvania History: A Journal of Mid-Atlantic Studies. 22 (1). Penn State University Press: 1–17. JSTOR 27769559.
- Chambers, Robert; Chambers, William (1839). The life and miscellaneous writings of Benjamin Franklin. Edinburgh: W. and R. Chambers.
- Crane, Verner Winslow (2018). Benjamin Franklin's Letters to the Press, 1758-1775. University of North Carolina Press Books. ISBN 978-0-8078-39515.
- Ford, Worthington Chauncy, ed. (1905). List of the Benjamin Franklin papers in the Library of Congress. Washington: Government Printing Office.
- —— (1962). Donovan, Frank Robert (ed.). The Benjamin Franklin papers. New York, Dodd, Mead.
  (Not to be confused with the subject of this article: Covers Franklin's literary style, use of capitals, italics, contractions, etc.)
- Henkels (Firm), Stan. V. (1924). Relics of Benjamin Franklin. Henkels & Sons, auction catalog. Catalog contains letters and artifacts belonging or relating to Franklin
- Franklin, Benjamin (1956). Mott, Frank Luther (ed.). Benjamin Franklin on newspapers. Columbia, Mo.: Press of the Crippled Turtle.
- Franklin, Benjamin (1906). Murphy, John Joseph (ed.). The wisdom of Benjamin Franklin; being reflections and observations on men and events, not included in Poor Richard's almanac; chosen from his collected papers. New York Brentano's.
- —— (1829–1830). Sparks, Jared (ed.). The Diplomatic Correspondence of the American Revolution, being the letters of Benjamin Franklin, Silas Deane, John Adams, John Jay, Arthur Lee ... and others. Vol. I. Boston, Hale.
- —— (1829–1830). —— (ed.). The diplomatic correspondence of the American Revolution. Vol. III. Boston, Hale.
- ——, ed. (1829–1830). The diplomatic correspondence of the American Revolution. Vol. IV. Boston, Hale. — Twelve volumes with numerous examples of Franklin's correspondence to and from the founders
- —— (1836–1840). Sparks, Jared (ed.). The works of Benjamin Franklin; containing several political and historical tracts not included in any former edition — In Twelve volumes. Vol. I. Boston, Hillard, Gray, and Company.
- —— (1833). Jared Sparks (ed.). Familiar letters and miscellaneous papers of Benjamin Franklin; now for the first time published. London, Jackson and Walford.
- Knollenberg, Bernhard (July 1972). "Benjamin Franklin and the Hutchinson and Oliver Letters". The Yale University Library Gazette. 47 (1). Yale University, acting through the Yale University Library: 1–9. JSTOR 40858439.
- Labaree, Leonard W. (April 1966). "New Franklin Letters". The Yale University Library Gazette. 40 (4). Yale University Library: 188–193. JSTOR 40858095.
- Goodman, Nathan G. (2011) [1956]. The Ingenious Dr. Franklin: Selected Scientific Letters of Benjamin Franklin. University of Pennsylvania Press. ISBN 978-0-8122-0561-9.
- —— (1891). "Unpublished Letters of Benjamin Franklin". The Pennsylvania Magazine of History and Biography. 15 (1). University of Pennsylvania Press: 35–40. JSTOR 20083407.
- —— (2010). Selected writings. New York: Fall River Press. ISBN 978-1-4351-37448.
- McMaster, John Bach (1887). Benjamin Franklin as a man of letters. Boston: Houghton, Mifflin and Company.
- Rosengarten, Joseph George (1903). The "Franklin papers" in the American philosophical society. Philadelphia: American Philosophical Society.
- Rosengarten, Joseph George (1903). Some new Franklin papers: a report. Library of Congress.
- Van Doren, Carl (1920). Benjamin Franklin and Jonathan Edwards; selections from their writings. Vol. 2. New York, Chicago C. Scribner's Sons.
- —— (1947). Letters and papers of Benjamin Franklin and Richard Jackson 1753-1785. American Philosophical Society.
- Wolf, Edwin (First Quarter 1962). "The Reconstruction of Benjamin Franklin's Library: An Unorthodox Jigsaw Puzzle". The Papers of the Bibliographical Society of America. 56 (1). The University of Chicago Press: 1–16. doi:10.1086/pbsa.56.1.24300972. JSTOR 24300972. S2CID 194487432.

== Publisher and printer ==
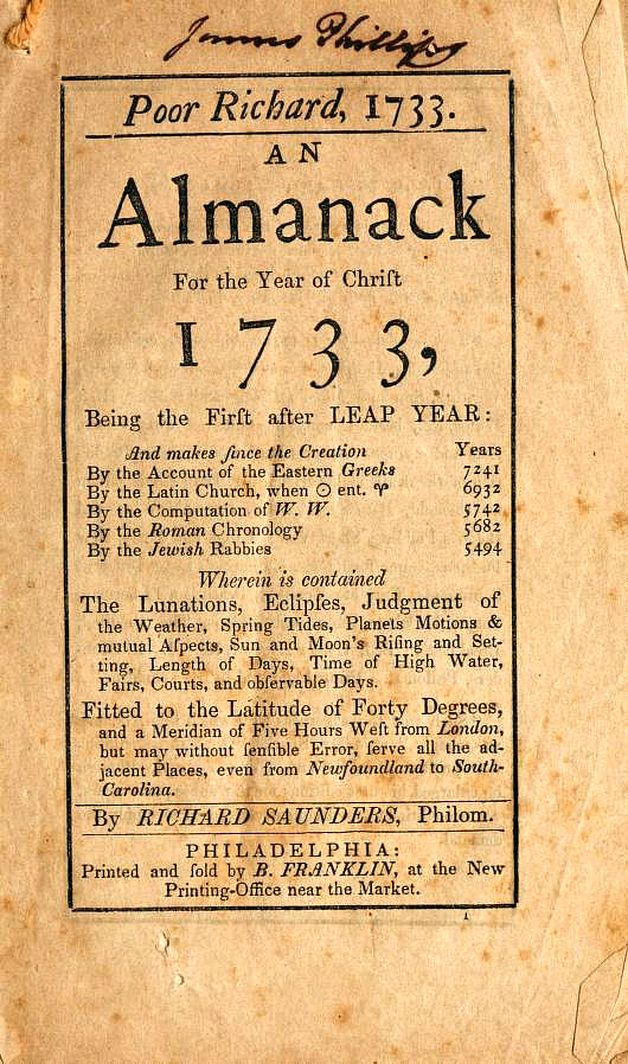
Poor Richard's Almanack, authored, printed and published by Franklin

Most of Franklin's biographers cover his printing and publishing involvements in varying proportions, while other works focus on this idea entirely. Franklin's early and mid life was greatly involved in that effort, beginning as an apprentice in the Boston print shop of his brother, James Franklin. He soon acquired and became the editor of The Pennsylvania Gazette and began publishing Poor Richard's Almanack. Franklin also brought innovations to the printing trade, helped to establish paper mills, and introduced new and improved printing type to colonial printers. During his career he took on various apprentices, and helped establish other upstart printers. Franklin's persistent efforts subsequently brought him favorable notoriety in printing and publishing circles, and a good measure of wealth by mid-life, inspiring him to write The Way to Wealth in 1758.

- Brigham, Clarence Saunders (May 1936). "James Franklin and the Beginnings of Printing in Rhode Island". Proceedings of the Massachusetts Historical Society. 65. Massachusetts Historical Society: 535–544. JSTOR 25080308.
- Frasca, Ralph (2006). Benjamin Franklin's printing network: disseminating virtue in early America. University of Missouri Press. ISBN 978-0-8262-16144.
- Harlan, Robert D. (1974). "David Hall and the Townshend Acts". The Papers of the Bibliographical Society of America. 68 (1). The University of Chicago Press on behalf of the Bibliographical Society of America: 19–38. doi:10.1086/pbsa.68.1.24302418. JSTOR 24302418. S2CID 163738868. (David Hall was Franklin's newspaper and printing partner)
- Hildeburn, Charles Swift Riché (1885). A century of printing: The issues of the press in Pennsylvania, 1685–1784. Philadelphia: Press of Matlack & Harvey. — (Numerous references to Franklin and his newspaper involvements)
- Hudson, Frederic (1873). Journalism in the United States, from 1690 to 1872. New York, Harper & Brothers. (This work contains numerous references to Franklin as printer and publisher.)
- Lee, James Melvin (1923). History of American journalism. Boston, New York, Houghton Mifflin Company. — Numerous references to Franklin and his brother James in the newspaper and printing business
- Lingelbach, William E. (May 5, 1948). "B. Franklin, Printer -- New Source Materials". Proceedings of the American Philosophical Society. 92 (2). American Philosophical Society: 79–100. JSTOR 3143405.
- Livingston, Luther Samuel (1914). Franklin and His Press at Passy: An Account of the Books, Pamphlets, and Leaflets Printed There, Including the Long-lost 'Bagatelles,̓. Grolier Club. ISBN 9780527576509.
- Miller, C. William (December 15, 1955). "Franklin's Type: Its Study past and Present". Proceedings of the American Philosophical Society. 99 (6). American Philosophical Society: 418–432. JSTOR 3143924.
- Miller, Clarence William (1974). Benjamin Franklin's Philadelphia printing, 1728-1766; a descriptive bibliography. Philadelphia, American Philosophical Society. ISBN 978-0-8716-9102-6.
- —— (1961). "Franklin's "Poor Richard Almanacs": Their Printing and Publication". Studies in Bibliography. 14. Bibliographical Society of the University of Virginia: 97–115. JSTOR 40371300.
- Mulford, Carla (December 2008). "Benjamin Franklin's Savage Eloquence: Hoaxes from the Press at Passy, 1782". Proceedings of the American Philosophical Society. 152 (4). American Philosophical Society: 490–530. JSTOR 40541605.
- Oswald, John Clyde (1917). Benjamin Franklin, printer. Doubleday, Page & company.
- Scott, Kenneth (1958). "James Franklin on counterfeiting". Museum Notes (American Numismatic Society). VIII. American Numismatic Society: 217–220. JSTOR 43573829.
- Stevenson, Augusta (1941). Ben Franklin, Printer's Boy. Bobbs-Merrill Company.
- Thomas, Isaiah (1874). The history of printing in America, with a biography of printers. Vol. I. New York, B. Franklin.
  (Numerous references to Franklin as a printer and his involvement with other printers and publishers)
- —— (1874). The history of printing in America, with a biography of printers. Vol. II. New York, B. Franklin.
  (Numerous references to Franklin as a printer and his involvement with other printers and publishers)
- Weeks, Lyman Horace (1916). A history of paper-manufacturing in the United States, 1690-1916. New York, The Lockwood trade journal company. — Cover's Franklin's involvements in helping to improve paper-mills and the manufacture of paper.
- Wroth, Lawrence C. (1938). The Colonial Printer. Portland, Me., The Southworth-Anthoensen press.
- Wroth, Lawrence Counselman (1981). Benjamin Franklin, the Printer at Work. Privately published.
- Zimmerman, John L. (October 1954). "Benjamin Franklin and the Pennsylvania Chronicle". The Pennsylvania Magazine of History and Biography. 81 (4). University of Pennsylvania Press: 351–364. JSTOR 20089013.

== Inventor, scientist ==
Franklin was widely considered by his contemporaries and others to be the best scientist in his time. He became curious about scientific phenomena as a youth, didn't pursue the field for pecuniary purposes, and rarely patented his inventions. Many of Franklin's scientific pursuits, mostly involving electricity, occurred while he was in England, where was made a member of the Royal Society and worked with scientists like John Canton, Peter Collinson, Johann Friedrich, John Hadley, Georg Wilhelm Richmann and Joseph Priestley, a well-known scientist in his own right who worked closely with Franklin, and did much to spread his fame.

- Cohen, I. Bernard (1941). Benjamin Franklin's Experiments: a new edition of Franklin's Experiments and observations on electricity. Harvard University Press.
- —— (June 20, 1952). "The Two Hundredth Anniversary of Benjamin Franklin's Two Lightning Experiments and the Introduction of the Lightning Rod". Proceedings of the American Philosophical Society. 96 (3). American Philosophical Society: 321–366. JSTOR 3143838.
- —— (1956). Franklin and Newton: An Inquiry Into Speculative Newtonian Experimental Science and Franklin's Work in Electricity as an Example Thereof. Harvard University Press.
- —— (1975). Benjamin Franklin, scientist and statesman. Scribner. ISBN 978-0-684-14251-7.
- —— (1990). Benjamin Franklin's Science. Harvard University Press. ISBN 978-0-674-06659-5.
- Harvey Nathaniel, Davis (1949). Benjamin Franklin, a bridge between science and the mechanic arts. Newcomen Society of England, American Branch.
- Diller, Theodore (1912). Franklin's contribution to medicine, being a collection of letters written by Benjamin Franklin bearing on the science and art of medicine. Brooklyn, N.Y., A.T. Huntington.
- Dray, Philip (2005). Stealing God's thunder: Benjamin Franklin's lightning rod and the invention of America. New York: Random House. ISBN 978-1-4000-6032-0.
- Duveen, Dennis I.; Klickstein, Herbert S. (1958). Benjamin Franklin and Antoine Laurent Lavoisier. Duveen Historical Library.
- Jernegan, Marcus W. (April 1928). "Benjamin Franklin's "Electrical Kite" and Lightning Rod". The New England Quarterly. 1 (2): 180–196. doi:10.2307/359764. JSTOR 359764.
- Mugridge, Donald H. (August 1947). "Scientific Manuscripts of Benjamin Franklin". Quarterly Journal of Current Acquisitions. 4 (4). Library of Congress: 12–21. JSTOR 29780476.
- Mulford, Carla J. (2016). "Print Journalism and Benjamin Franklin's Scientific Politics". The Yearbook of English Studies. 46. Modern Humanities Research Association: 181–197. doi:10.1353/yes.2016.0013.
- Pasles, Paul (2008). Benjamin Franklin's numbers: an unsung mathematical odyssey. Princeton, N.J.: Princeton University Press. ISBN 978-0-6911-2956-3.
  - Priestley, Joseph (1775). The history and present state of electricity, with original experiments. Vol. I. London: C. Bathurst & T. Lowndes.
  - —— (1775). The history and present state of electricity, with original experiments. Vol. II. London: C. Bathurst & T. Lowndes. — Fellow scientist and colleague of Franklin; Priestley's work makes numerous references to Franklin throughout volumes one and two.
  - —— (1772). Additions to the History and present state of electricity. London: J. Johnson.
- Seeger, Raymond J. (May 1959). "Franklin as a physicist". Journal of the Washington Academy of Sciences. 49 (5). Washington Academy of Sciences: 129–145. JSTOR 24534715.
- Seeger, Raymind John (1973). Men of physics: Benjamin Franklin, New World physicist. Oxford; New York: Pergamon Press. ISBN 978-0-0801-7648-2.
- Stearns, Raymond Phineas (1970). Science in the British Colonies of America. University of Illinois Press. ISBN 978-0-252-00120-8.
- Schiffer, Michael Brian (October 14, 2003). Draw the Lightning Down: Benjamin Franklin and Electrical Technology in the Age of Enlightenment. University of California Press. ISBN 978-0-520-23802-2.
- Tucker, Tom (April 24, 2009). Bolt Of Fate: Benjamin Franklin And His Fabulous Kite. PublicAffairs. ISBN 978-0-7867-3942-4.
- Wallace, Stanley L. (July–August 1968). "Benjamin Franklin and the Introduction of Colchicum Into the United States". Bulletin of the History of Medicine. 42 (4). Johns Hopkins University Press: 312–320. JSTOR 44447286. PMID 4881500.
- Weinberger, Jerry (Winter 2007). "The Scientific Mind of Ben Franklin". The New Atlantis (15). Center for the Study of Technology and Society: 77–91. JSTOR 43152306.

== Primary sources ==
- Franklin, Benjamin (1793). The private life of the late Benjamin Franklin. London: Printed for J. Parsons, no. 2l, Pater-Noster Row. "Originally written by himself and now translated from the French"
- Franklin, Benjamin (Spring 2010). "Constitutional Convention Speech". Litigation. 36 (3). American Bar Association: 64. JSTOR 29760791. (Note: Editor's Note: "Benjamin Franklin's voice was weak so James Wilson read this speech for him on the final day of the Constitutional Convention, Monday, September 17, 1787. Franklin then moved for the adoption of the Constitution.")
- —— (1956). Labaree, Leonard Woods; Bell, Whitfield J. Jr (eds.). Mr. Franklin: a selection from his personal letters. New Haven: Yale University Press; London: Geoffrey Cumberlege, Oxford University Press. - A selection of letters from The Papers of Benjamin Franklin, published in commemoration of the 250th anniversary of Franklin's birth
- —— (1976) [1733–1758]. Brooks, Van Wyck (ed.). Poor Richard: The Almanacks for the years 1733-1758. New York: Paddington Press. ISBN 978-0-8467-0120-0.
- —— (1769). Experiments and observations on electricity, made at Philadelphia in America. London: Printed for David Henry; and sold by Francis Newberry.
- —— (1793). Works of the late Doctor Benjamin Franklin. Vol. I. Dublin: Printed for P. Wogan, P. Byrne, J. Moore, and W. Jones.
- —— (1793). Works of the late Doctor Benjamin Franklin. Vol. II. London, Printed for G. G. J. and J. Robinson.
- —— (1817). William Temple Franklin (ed.). The private correspondence of Benjamin Franklin ... written between the years 1753 and 1790. London Printed for H. Colburn.
- —— (1902). Smith, Benjamin Eli (ed.). Poor Richard's Almanack. New York, The Century Co.
- —— (1997). Autobiography, Poor Richard, and later writings: letters from London, 1757-1775, Paris, 1776-1785, Philadelphia, 1785-1790. New York: Library of America. ISBN 978-1-883011-53-6.
  - —— (1811). The complete works, in philosophy, politics and morals of the late Dr. Benjamin Franklin. Vol. I. London: Printed for Longman, Hurst, Rees, Orme, and Brown; James Cundee, printer.
  - —— (1811). The complete works, in philosophy, politics and morals of the late Dr. Benjamin Franklin. Vol. II. London: Printed for Longman, Hurst, Rees, Orme, and Brown; James Cundee, printer.
  - —— (1811). The complete works, in philosophy, politics and morals of the late Dr. Benjamin Franklin. Vol. III. London: Printed for Longman, Hurst, Rees, Orme, and Brown; James Cundee, printer.
- —— (1814). The Way to Wealth. London: Printed by W. Darton. — This work has been published by numerous publishers over the years.
- —— (1838). M'Gowan, John (ed.). The life and essays of Dr. Benjamin Franklin. Philadelphia, Leary & Getz.
- —— (1931). Pepper, William (ed.). Proposals Relating to the Education of Youth in Pensilvania. University of Pennsylvania Press.
- —— (1836–1840). Sparks, Jared (ed.). The works of Benjamin Franklin; containing several political and historical tracts not included in any former edition — In Twelve volumes. Vol. I. Boston, Hillard, Gray, and Company.
- —— (1775). Vaughan, Benjamin (ed.). Political, miscellaneous, and philosophical pieces. London: Printed for J. Johnson.
- —— (1826). Vaughan, Benjamin; Price, Richard; Gibelin, Jacques; Stueber, Henry (eds.). The works of Dr. Benjamin Franklin: consisting of essays, humorous, moral, and literary; with his life. London: Printed for T. and J. Allman ...
- —— (1819). Franklin, William Temple (ed.). Posthumous and other writings of Benjamin Franklin. Vol. I. London: Henry Colburn.
- —— (1819). Franklin, William Temple (ed.). Posthumous and other writings of Benjamin Franklin. Vol. II. London: Henry Colburn.
- —— (1841). Walker, George (ed.). The chess player ... containing Franklin's essay on the Morals of chess. Boston, N. Dearborn. — See also: Wikipedia: The Morals of Chess
- —— (2000) [1729]. A Modest Enquiry Into the Nature and Necessity of a Paper-currency. Benjamin Franklin, printer.
- —— (1900) [1865]. The ledger of Doctor Benjamin Franklin ... postmaster general, 1776. Vineland, N.J.: Historic Documents Pub. Co. "A facsimile of the original manuscript now on file on the records of the Post office department of the United States"
- —— (1725). A Dissertation on Liberty and Necessity, Pleasure and Pain
- —— (1908). Bigelow, Frederick Southgate (ed.). Worldly wisdom from Benjamin Franklin. Philadelphia: H. Altemus Company.

=== Autobiography ===
Many editions of Franklin's autobiography have been published over the years, some with letters, writings and other related material authored by Franklin. Franklin's original manuscript of his autobiography was not published while Franklin was alive and had disappeared sometime after his death. It was later discovered by Edouard Laboulaye and purchased by John Bigelow for 25,000 franks, who published it in 1868.

- Franklin, Benjamin (1844). Jared Sparks (ed.). The life of Benjamin Franklin: containing the autobiography, with notes and a continuation. Boston: Tappan and Dennet.
- —— (1868). Bigelow, John (ed.). Autobiography of Benjamin Franklin. Philadelphia, J.B. Lippincott & Co. (Note: Bigelow's edition is not only the first appearance of the autobiography from Franklin's original manuscript, but also the first publication in English of the four parts, and the first publication of the important 'outline' autobiography.--Ford, Franklin bibl., no. 423; 100 copies printed))
- —— (1900). Spofford, Ainsworth Rand (ed.). Autobiography; Poor Richard; Letters. New York: D. Appleton and Company.
  Spofford Includes a twenty-one page introduction about Franklin.
- —— (1895). Altemus, Henry (ed.). The autobiography of Benjamin Franklin. Philadelphia: Henry Altemus.
- —— (1907). Smyth, Albert Henry (ed.). The autobiography of Benjamin Franklin. New York, American book company.
- —— (1909). The autobiography of Benjamin Franklin. Stilwell, KS. ISBN 978-1-59625-449-7.
- —— (1936). The autobiography of Benjamin Franklin, Poor Richard's almanac and other papers. Spencer Press.
- —— (1941). Haight, Gordon S. (ed.). The autobiography of Benjamin Franklin. Published for the Classics Club by Walter J. Black Inc., Roslyn, New York.
- —— (2005). Trees, Andrew S. (ed.). The autobiography of Benjamin Franklins. New York: Barnes & Noble Books. ISBN 0760768617.
- —— (2006). Skousen, Mark (ed.). The compleated autobiography. Washington, DC: Regnery Publishing. ISBN 978-0-8952-6033-8.
  Contains an appendix which includes a seven-page Afterword, Franklin's last will and testament, and a list of sources
- —— (2008). The autobiography of Benjamin Franklin. Bedford, Mass.: Applewood Book. ISBN 978-1-5570-90799.

=== The Papers of Benjamin Franklin ===
This collection of Franklin's letters and other works is a collaborative effort by a team of scholars and editors at Yale University and American Philosophical Society and is an ongoing effort which began in 1959, with more than forty volumes published, and is expected to reach upwards near fifty volumes upon completion. Those that are available for viewing are listed below.

- Franklin, Benjamin (1960). Labaree, Leonard Woods; Bell, Whitfield Jr. (eds.). The Papers of Benjamin Franklin. Vol. I. Yale University Press.
- —— (1959). The Papers of Benjamin Franklin. Vol. II. American Philosophical Society & Yale University.
- —— (1959). The Papers of Benjamin Franklin. Vol. III. American Philosophical Society & Yale University.
- —— (1962). The Papers of Benjamin Franklin. Vol. V. American Philosophical Society & Yale University.
- —— (1963). The Papers of Benjamin Franklin. Vol. VI. American Philosophical Society & Yale University.
- —— (1962). The Papers of Benjamin Franklin. Vol. VII. American Philosophical Society & Yale University.
- —— (1968). The Papers of Benjamin Franklin. Vol. XII. American Philosophical Society & Yale University.
- —— (1969). The Papers of Benjamin Franklin. Vol. XIII. American Philosophical Society & Yale University.
- —— (1973). The Papers of Benjamin Franklin. Vol. XVII. American Philosophical Society & Yale University. ISBN 9780300016857.
- —— (1959). The Papers of Benjamin Franklin. Vol. XVIII. American Philosophical Society & Yale University. ISBN 9780300016857.

=== The Writings of Benjamin Franklin ===
The Writings of Benjamin Franklin is a collection of works, edited by Professor Albert Henry Smyth, a past member of the American Historical Society, and published in ten volumes between 1905 and 1907

- Franklin, Benjamin (1905). Smyth, Albert Henry (ed.). The writings of Benjamin Franklin. Vol. I. New York, London: The Macmillan Company, Ten volumes. ISBN 9780838301944.
- —— (1907). —— (ed.). The writings of Benjamin Franklin. Vol. II. New York, London: The Macmillan Company, Ten volumes. ISBN 9780838301944.
- —— (1907). —— (ed.). The writings of Benjamin Franklin. Vol. III. New York, London: The Macmillan Company, Ten volumes. ISBN 9780838301944.
- —— (1906). —— (ed.). The writings of Benjamin Franklin. Vol. IV. New York, London: The Macmillan Company, Ten volumes.
- —— (1907). —— (ed.). The writings of Benjamin Franklin. Vol. V. New York, London: The Macmillan Company, Ten volumes.
- —— (1906). —— (ed.). The writings of Benjamin Franklin. Vol. VI. New York, London: The Macmillan Company, Ten volumes.
- —— (1906). —— (ed.). The writings of Benjamin Franklin. Vol. VII. New York, London: The Macmillan Company, Ten volumes.
- —— (1906). —— (ed.). The writings of Benjamin Franklin. Vol. VIII. New York, London: The Macmillan Company, Ten volumes.
- —— (1906). —— (ed.). The writings of Benjamin Franklin. Vol. IX. New York, London: The Macmillan Company, Ten volumes.
- —— (1906). —— (ed.). The writings of Benjamin Franklin. Vol. X. New York, London: The Macmillan Company, Ten volumes.

== Further information ==
Many of the papers of individuals closely associated with Franklin often offer much information about Franklin.

- Silas Deane (1887). The Papers of Silas Deane. Vol. V. American Philosophical Society.

== See also ==
- Bibliography of early American publishers and printers
- Bibliography of George Washington
- Bibliography of Thomas Jefferson
- Bibliography of the American Revolution
- Bibliography of the War of 1812
- List of bibliographies on American history

== Sources ==
- "About the Papers of Benjamin Franklin". National Archives.
- Rivers, Isabel; Wykes, David L. (2008). Joseph Priestley, Scientist, Philosopher, and Theologian. Oxford University Press. ISBN 978-0-1992-1530-0.
- Padover, Saul K.; Landynski, Jacob W. (1995). The Living U.S. Constitution (3rd rev. ed.). New York: Meridian. ISBN 978-0-452-01147-2.
- Franklin, Benjamin (Spring 2010). "Constitutional Convention Speech". Litigation. 36 (3). American Bar Association: 64. JSTOR 29760791.
