= Leonard Woods Labaree =

American historian (1897–1980)

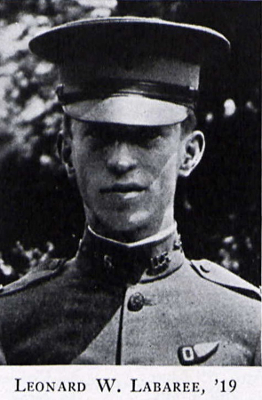
Leonard W. Labaree in 1919

Leonard W. Labaree (August 26, 1897, near Urumia, Persia – May 5, 1980, in Northford, Connecticut) was an American documentary editor, a professor of history at Yale University for more than forty years, a historian of Colonial America, and the founding editor of the multivolume publication of The Papers of Benjamin Franklin.

== Early life and education ==
Leonard W. Labaree was the son of Benjamin Labaree, an American missionary in Persia. He obtained his bachelor's degree at Williams College in 1920, and graduated with Phi Beta Kappa honors, after qualifying as a balloon pilot in the U.S. Army Air Service and as a second lieutenant in 1917–1919. In 1924 went on to Yale University, where he earned his master's degree in history in 1923 and his Ph.D. in 1926. In 1920, he married Elizabeth Mary Calkins, with whom he had two sons, Arthur C. Labaree and the historian Benjamin Woods Labaree. In 1930, Labaree wrote and published a work entitled, Royal Government in America: a Study of the British Colonial System before 1783, for which he received the Justin Winsor Prize of the American Historical Association.

== Professional career ==
Labaree taught history at Milford School, Milford, Connecticut, in 1920–22, while at the same time writing his master's degree thesis on the history of the town: Milford, Connecticut: The Early development of the Town as Shown in its Land Records. While still working for his doctorate under the tutelage of Professor Charles McLean Andrews at Yale University with his thesis on Royal Government in America, Labaree was appointed an instructor in history in 1924. He was promoted to assistant professor in 1927 and to associate professor in 1938. In 1942, he was named Durfee Professor and served as chairman of Yale's History Department. Then in 1948, he was named Farnham Professor of History at Yale, a chair previously held by his mentor, Charles McLean Andrews. Labaree held the Farnham chair until he retired in 1966. He served as State Historian of Connecticut, 1941–51. In 1954, he began his work, sponsored jointly by Yale University and the American Philosophical Society as editor in chief of The Papers of Benjamin Franklin, the first fruit of which was his 1956 book Mr. Franklin. Labaree's exemplary work on the Franklin Papers consolidated his reputation for the highest standards of documentary editing with thoroughness, accuracy, and clarity of explication.

He served on the Council of the Institute of Early American History and Culture, the Secretary of the Navy's Advisory Committee on Naval History, and was a member of the editorial board of the New England Quarterly, succeeding Samuel Eliot Morison as its chairman. In addition, he was a member of the American Antiquarian Society, the Colonial Society of Massachusetts, the Massachusetts Historical Society, and the American Philosophical Society.

Labaree died at his home in Northford, Connecticut on May 5, 1980, at the age of 83.

== Awards ==
- Justin Winsor Prize of the American Historical Association, 1930.
- Honorary Litt. D., Williams College, 1955, Bucknell University, 1955; Franklin College, 1956; Franklin and Marshall College, 1956; Dickinson College, 1963, and Lehigh University, 1970.
- Gold Medal of the International Benjamin Franklin Society, 1961.
- He was Anson G. Phelps lecturer, New York University, 1947.

== Published works ==
- Royal government in America; a study of the British colonial system before 1783, 1930; repr. 1958
- Yale Historical Publications, general editor for forty volumes, 1933–1936
- Royal instructions to British colonial governors, 1670-1776, 1935
- Records of the State of Connecticut, 1782-1796, volumes IV-VIII, 1942–1951
- Conservatism in early American history, 1948
- Mr. Franklin, a selection from his personal letters. Edited by Leonard W. Labaree and Whitfield J. Bell Jr., 1956
- The Papers of Benjamin Franklin, editor in chief for eighteen volumes, 1959–74

== Sources ==
- Bell, Whitfield J. (January 1955). "Franklin Papers and the Papers of Benjamin Franklin". Pennsylvania History: A Journal of Mid-Atlantic Studies. 22 (1). Penn State University Press: 1–17. JSTOR 27769559.
- Bell, Whitfield J. (1980). "Leonard Woods Labaree". Proceedings of the Massachusetts Historical Society. 92. Massachusetts Historical Society: 156–160. JSTOR 25080876.
- Pierson, George W. (December 1980). "In Memoriam: Leonard Woods Labaree (1897-1980)". The New England Quarterly. 53 (4). The New England Quarterly, Inc.: 544–546. JSTOR 365496.
- Labaree, Leonard W. (1958). Royal government in America; a study of the British colonial system before 1783. New York, F. Ungar Pub. Co.
