= The Papers of Benjamin Franklin =

Collaborative effort by a team of scholars

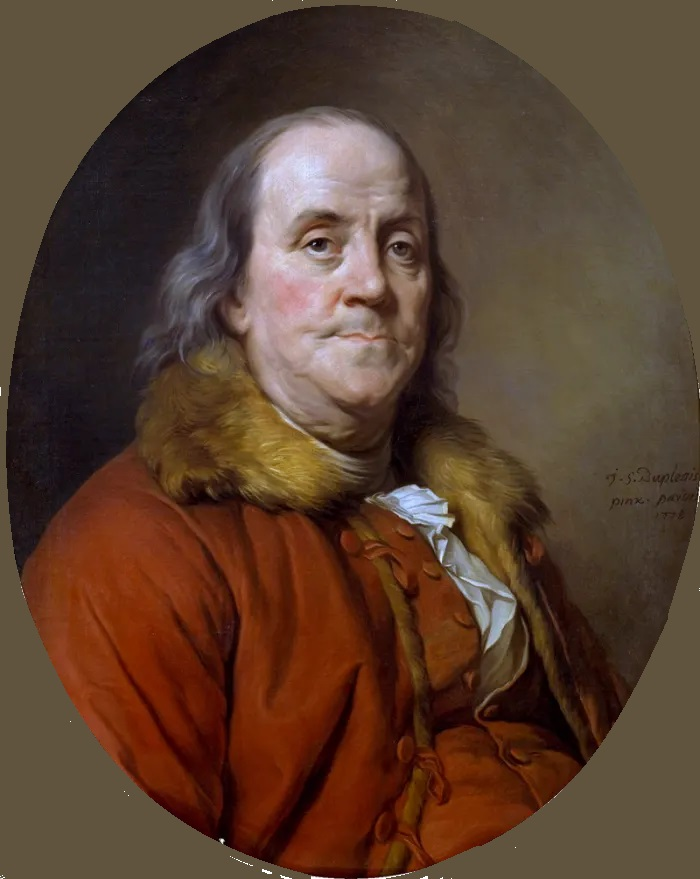
Benjamin Franklin (1706–1790) During his entire adult life Franklin saved his correspondence, documents and other writings, which today include some 30,000 extant items.

The Papers of Benjamin Franklin is a collaborative effort by a team of scholars at Yale University, American Philosophical Society and others who have searched, collected, edited, and published the numerous letters from and to Benjamin Franklin, and other works, especially those involved with the American Revolutionary period and thereafter. The publication of Franklin's papers has been an ongoing production since its first issue in 1959, and is expected to reach nearly fifty volumes, with more than forty volumes completed as of 2022. The costly project was made possible from donations by the American Philosophical Association and Life magazine.

Of the sources used to cover Franklin's life, Franklin biographer Henry Brands has maintained that the major source for Franklin's life among historians are his own correspondence and writings, and in particular, Franklin's autobiography. He considers The Papers of Benjamin Franklin, "by far the best" and "a model of scholarly editing". Biographer Walter Isaacson has referred to The Papers of Benjamin Franklin as "definitive and extraordinary," noting that while several publications of Franklin's papers exist, this ongoing publication is the most complete and scholarly. The first editor to amass and organize the papers was Leonard W. Labaree, beginning in 1959. Since then a good number of editors have and continue to oversee this task. Works and collections other than the continuing Yale/APS publication have also been published and are nominally featured here.

== Provenance ==
During Franklin's adult life, as a learned man, he saved his correspondence and other writings with posterity in mind. When he embarked for France in 1776, he entrusted his many papers, contained in a large chest, which included his correspondence while in England and the manuscript of his Autobiography, to his old friend, Joseph Galloway, who kept them at his home in Trevose Manor (Note: Now known as Growden Mansion) aside Philadelphia. Upon the occupation of Philadelphia by the British, Galloway's estate was searched and confiscated and in the haste Franklin's papers were scattered about in and outside the house, where some were destroyed by the weather. Though a good friend with Franklin and other patriots who were advocating American independence, Galloway remained an unyielding Loyalist, and in June 1778 fled Philadelphia with the British, leaving, among other things, Franklin's papers behind. When Franklin learned of Galloway's situation and of the seizure on his estate, he became apprehensive about what had become of his papers and wrote to his son-in-law, Richard Bache, about matters. Bache followed up and discovered the trunk, which had been broken open and with some of its papers scattered about. Bache collected all that he could, and in a letter of June 20, 1781 informed Franklin of his discovery and effort. Franklin wrote back repeatedly to Bache, urging him to look further, but to no avail. Subsequently, some of Franklin's letters, pamphlets and manuscripts from before 1775 were irretrievably lost. Historian, and one of the early documentary editors of The Papers of Benjamin Franklin, Whitfield Bell, said that it was a "marvel" that any of the Franklin's papers entrusted to Galloway had survived at all.

The original papers of Benjamin Franklin are the property of approximately three hundred owners. About one-third of them are private individuals which include both the descendants of Franklin and his correspondents, while other owners include autograph, book and manuscript collectors. The other two thirds of the Franklin papers belong to institutions, including libraries, historical societies, public archives, or other such institutions. In 1954, various institutions came together and offered their collections of Franklin papers for photo-copying by a full-time editorial staff working at the editorial headquarters situated within the Yale University Library, where they continue to be collated and prepared for publication.

== APS and Yale publication ==
The Papers of Benjamin Franklin, bookcover of the APS/Yale publication

The Papers of Benjamin Franklin was established in 1953 under the joint auspices of American Philosophical Society and Yale University, both of whom were in possession of thousands of Franklin's letters and other writings. Historian Carl Becker maintains that Franklin "was acquainted personally or through correspondence with more men of eminence in letters, science and politics than any other man of his time". Historian John Bach McMaster, who wrote extensively about Franklin's letter writing, characterized Franklin as "a man of letters". Franklin biographer, Carl Van Doren, said of Franklin that, "letter writing with him was a form of art".

Beginning in 1951, the National Historical Publications Commission listed sixty-six prominent Americans whose writings they considered "of such outstanding importance that they need to be published", with the expectation that they would provide invaluable insights into American history. Benjamin Franklin's name was at the top of that list. Many historians were in agreement with that assertion, in that no American during the eighteenth century had influenced his age and country, or made greater contributions in many varied aspects, than Franklin had. During the first half of the twentieth century, many of Franklin's letters and documents had come to light but existed as separate collections, or in private and public libraries and other institutions. As such, it was deemed necessary to record and compile this scattered conglomeration of papers and amass and sort them into one large publication and made available to all historians, scholars and students.

The project was first funded by a donation of $425,000 from Life Magazine (equivalent to $5,152,726 in 2025), and $175,000 from the American Philosophical Society, and later by grants from foundations, individuals, and from the National Historical Publications and Records Commission and the National Endowment for the Humanities.

The project to publish Franklin's thousands of papers and other documents began in 1952 at the home of Alfred Whitney Griswold, Yale University's president, where the extensive collection of William Mason Smith at the Sterling Memorial Library was discussed. In autumn of that year, advice from Leonard W. Labaree, a member of the Yale history department for 42 years, was requested, with the hopes that a new edition of Franklin's papers would result. The Franklin project was inspired by a similar project involving the papers of Thomas Jefferson at Princeton University. Labaree made it clear that no such project could reach fruition without the full cooperation of the American Philosophical Society. Several meetings were held in Philadelphia, under the auspices of Society president, Justice Owen J. Roberts, an agreement was made and the joint sponsorship formally established in 1953. Editors and editorial offices were selected and on the 248th anniversary of Franklin's birth a public announcement was made about the commencement of the project. The Director of Yale University Press, Chester Kerr, gave assurances that nothing but the best printing, design and materials would be employed in the production of the Franklin Papers. A comprehensive listing of the Franklin Papers can be viewed at the National Archives.

The project has been ongoing, and as of 2022, forty-three volumes have been published and is expected to reach forty-seven, and will include some 30,000 extant papers. More than half of the overall collection of papers are in possession of the American Philosophical Society. Each of the volumes have their own index, with a cumulative index at the end. Much of Franklin's literary works have never been reprinted since they first appeared in the 1720s and 1730s. The publishers at Yale University hold that the project will add usefully to the existing body of early American materials. Of special interests to collectors will be the reproduction in photographic facsimile, for the first time, of the entire twenty-four pages of the "first impression" of the first Poor Richard's Almanack, taken from a one-of-a-kind copy housed in the Rosenbach Museum and Library in Philadelphia.

The Papers of Benjamin Franklin project is considered to have offered new scholarly information, with significant work being done on Franklin's life that has resulted in a new level of sophistication during the second half of the twentieth century. Today scholars and students have available to them more information and historical analysis on Franklin and his associations than those of previous generations.

Several publications of Franklin's papers were issued prior to the APS-Yale publication, which includes those of editors Jared Sparks (1836–1840), John Bigelow (1900-1903) and Albert Henry Smyth (1905-1906).

=== Yale collection ===
This collection, originally referred to at Yale as the Mason-Franklin Collection, is the most extensive collection of works, letters and documents by or about Franklin and his times. It also includes various books and pamphlets owned and sometimes printed by Franklin, with some of them having imprints used by Franklin as a printer. The collection was first amassed early in the twentieth century by William Smith Mason of Yale who graduated in the class of 1888. The collection was housed at his home in Evanston, Illinois, where he hired a personal librarian to assist him in gathering materials, and for their organization and care. Yale alumni and faculty member, James H. Hutson, at one time served as one among several editors of the Franklin Papers.

The Mason-Yale collection also consists of a sizeable assortment of pictorial material, which includes an original contemporary oil portrait of Franklin, considered to be historically important, a few other oils paintings, and several hundred contemporary and later portraits of Franklin and his associates. A number of these prints have been set in frames and are on display at Yale's Sterling Memorial Library. The remaining pictures have been sorted and stored in cases where they have been made available for future reference. There are also a number of art objects of significance in the Mason-Yale collection, which include several marble busts which have been put on display at the library. The collection also includes a number of small sculptures in bronze and porcelain, and along with some bronze medallions.

=== APS collection ===
Franklin began saving his correspondence, documents and other papers as a young man. Over the course of his life he had amassed a huge collection of letters and other papers, which, two years before his death, he bequeathed to his grandson, William Temple Franklin. William used them in his authorship of, The Life and Writings of Benjamin Franklin. William stored Benjamin's massive collection at the home of George Fox near Philadelphia. When William embarked for England in 1817 he brought with him a portion for use in completion of a six volume work, Calendar of the papers of Benjamin Franklin, a comprehensive work on Benjamin's writings and correspondence. Before William Temple died in 1823 he bequeathed the collection to George Fox, who in turn bequeathed it to his children, Charles P. Fox and Mary Fox. In July 1840 his children handed over the collection to The American Philosophical Society who gained formal possession in September that year.

Not included were a small portion of Franklin papers which had become mixed with the Fox family papers that were also stored in a loft of the stable at Champlost. The misplaced Franklin papers were discovered twenty-two years later when the loft was being cleaned out by a house guest of the Fox family, Mrs. Holbrook. In 1903 these were purchased from her descendants by friends of the University of Pennsylvania, which became part of its library. The University of Pennsylvania eventually gave them as a gift to the American Philosophical Society.

=== Other collections ===
In addition to the APS and Yale collections, there are other significant collections of Franklin's papers including those at the Historical Society of Pennsylvania, University of Pennsylvania in Philadelphia, the William Clements Library at the University of Michigan, and the Huntington Library in San Marino, California.

The Library of Congress has a collection of Franklin's papers, consisting of approximately 8,000 items, most of them dating from the 1770s and 1780s. The papers consist of correspondence to Franklin as an early American publisher, scientist, and diplomat beginning with the year 1726. The majority of them date from the 1770s and 1780s. The collection is mostly devoted to Franklin's diplomatic roles as a colonial representative during his stay in London (1757 to 1762 and 1764 to 1775) and while in France (1776–1785), where he successfully won the recognition and funding from European countries during the American Revolution. After the war he negotiated the Treaty of Paris with Great Britain that resolved most differences between the former adversaries which brought an end to that seven-year war. Franklin also served as the first United States minister to France. The Franklin papers also document his work as an inventor, scientist, and many involvements with his family, friends, along with his many scientific and political associates.

Franklin often corresponded with George Washington, Thomas Jefferson, and other such notable figures, where some of these items are also considered part of The Papers of these individuals also. Those among the George Washington Papers contain approximately 62 items to or from Franklin, with some papers making reference to Franklin etc. The Papers of Thomas Jefferson contain 55 items to or from Franklin with many of them documenting Franklin's diplomatic capacity while representing America in France during and briefly after the American Revolution. There are three items from Franklin among The Papers of James Madison.

== See also ==
- Founding Fathers of the United States
- The Autobiography of Benjamin Franklin
- Leonard Woods Labaree and Whitfield J. Bell, editors of The Papers of Benjamin Franklin

== Bibliography ==
- Bell, Whitfield J. (January 1955). "Franklin Papers and the Papers of Benjamin Franklin". Pennsylvania History: A Journal of Mid-Atlantic Studies. 22 (1). Penn State University Press: 1–17. JSTOR 27769559.
- Bell, Whitfield J. (1980). "Leonard Woods Labaree". Proceedings of the Massachusetts Historical Society. 92. Massachusetts Historical Society: 156–160. JSTOR 25080876.
- Becker, Carl L. (1946). Benjamin Franklin. Cornell University Press, Ithaca, New York.
- Brands, H. W. (2000). The First American: The Life and Times of Benjamin Franklin. Knopf Doubleday Publishing. ISBN 978-0-385-49540-0.
- Franklin, Benjamin (1904). Bigelow, John (ed.). The works of Benjamin Franklin : including the private as well as the official and scientific correspondence. Vol. VII. New York; London : G.P. Putnam's Sons, The Knickerbocker Press.
- —— (1904). Bigelow, John (ed.). The works of Benjamin Franklin : including the private as well as the official and scientific correspondence. Vol. IX. New York; London : G.P. Putnam's Sons, The Knickerbocker Press.
- Dull, Jonathan R. (1982). "Franklin the Diplomat: The French Mission". Transactions of the American Philosophical Society. 72 (1). American Philosophical Society: 1–76. doi:10.2307/1006441. JSTOR 1006441.
- Franklin, Benjamin (1960). Labaree, Leonard Woods; Bell, Whitfield Jr. (eds.). The Papers of Benjamin Franklin. Vol. I. Yale University Press.
- —— (1959). ——; —— (eds.). The Papers of Benjamin Franklin. Vol. II. Yale University Press.
- —— (1959). ——; —— (eds.). The Papers of Benjamin Franklin. Vol. III. Yale University Press.
- —— (1962). ——; —— (eds.). The Papers of Benjamin Franklin. Vol. V. Yale University Press.
- —— (1963). ——; —— (eds.). The Papers of Benjamin Franklin. Vol. VI. Yale University Press.
- —— (1969). ——; —— (eds.). The Papers of Benjamin Franklin. Vol. XIII. Yale University Press.
- —— (1973). ——; —— (eds.). The Papers of Benjamin Franklin. Vol. XVII. Yale University Press. ISBN 9780300016857.
- —— (1906). Smyth, Albert Henry (ed.). The writings of Benjamin Franklin. Vol. VIII. New York, London: The Macmillan Company, Ten volumes.
- —— (1906). —— (ed.). The writings of Benjamin Franklin. Vol. IX. New York, London: The Macmillan Company, Ten volumes.
- Hutson, James H. (2008). Church and state in America : the first two centuries. Cambridge University Press.
- Pangle, Lorraine Smith (2007). The political philosophy of Benjamin Franklin. Baltimore : Johns Hopkins University Press. ISBN 978-0-8018-79319.
- Lingelbach, William E. (December 1955). "Benjamin Franklin's Papers and the American Philosophical Society". Proceedings of the American Philosophical Society. 99 (6). American Philosophical Society: 359–380. JSTOR 3143918.
- Skemp, Sheila L. (1994). Benjamin and William Franklin : father and son, patriot and loyalist. Boston : Bedford Books of St. Martin's Press. ISBN 978-0-3120-86176.
- Skemp, Sheila L. (April 1885). "William Franklin: His Father's Son". The Pennsylvania Magazine of History and Biography. 109 (2). University of Pennsylvania Press: 145–178. JSTOR 20091919.
- —— (1959). Wilcox, William B. (ed.). The Papers of Benjamin Franklin. Vol. XVIII. Yale University Press. ISBN 9780300016857.
- —— (1975). Wilcox, William B. (ed.). The Papers of Benjamin Franklin. Vol. XIX. Yale University Press. ISBN 978-0-3000-18653.
- I. Minis Hays, ed. (1908). Calendar of the papers of Benjamin Franklin in the library of the American Philosophical Society. Vol. I. Philadelphia, Printed for the American Philosophical Society.
- Isaacson, Walter (2004). Benjamin Franklin : an American life. New York : Simon & Schuster. ISBN 978-0-6848-07614.
- Labaree, Leonard W.; Bell, Jr., Whitfield J. (December 19, 1957). "The Papers of Benjamin Franklin: A Progress Report". Proceedings of the American Philosophical Society. 101 (6). American Philosophical Society: 532–534. JSTOR 985521.
- Labaree, Leonard W. (April 1966). "New Franklin Letters". The Yale University Library Gazette. 40 (4). Yale University Library: 188–193. JSTOR 40858095.
- McMaster, John Bach (1887). Benjamin Franklin as a man of letters. Boston : Houghton, Mifflin and Company.
- Van Doren, Carl (1938). Benjamin Franklin. New York : Viking Press.
- Jared Sparks, ed. (1829–1830). The diplomatic correspondence of the American Revolution, being the letters of Benjamin Franklin, Silas Deane, John Adams, John Jay, Arthur Lee ... and others. Vol. I. Boston, Hale.
- Franklin, Benjamin (1836–1840). Sparks, Jared (ed.). The works of Benjamin Franklin; containing several political and historical tracts not included in any former edition. Vol. IV. Boston, Hillard, Gray, and Company.
- Mathews, L. K. (August 1914). "Benjamin Franklin's Plans for a Colonial Union, 1750–1775". The American Political Science Review. 8 (3). American Political Science Association: 393–412. doi:10.2307/1946173. JSTOR 1946173. S2CID 147320261.
- Mulford, Carla (2008). The Cambridge companion to Benjamin Franklin. Cambridge University Press. ISBN 978-0-5218-71341.
- Pierson, George W. (December 1980). "In Memoriam: Leonard Woods Labaree (1897-1980)". The New England Quarterly. 53 (4). The New England Quarterly, Inc.: 544–546. JSTOR 365496.
- Franklin, Benjamin (1959). Leonard W. Labaree (ed.). "Yale University Press: The Papers of Benjamin Franklin, Vol. 1". Yale University Press.
- "The Papers of Benjamin Franklin: About the Project". Yale University. 2022.
- "The Papers of Benjamin Franklin: About Yale's Franklin Collection". Yale University. 2022.
- "Benjamin Franklin Papers". Library of Congress.
- "Benjamin Franklin Papers: Web Guide". Library of Congress.
- "About the Papers of Benjamin Franklin". National Archives.
- "The Papers of Benjamin Franklin (listing)". National Archives.
- Lyons, Jonathan (2013). "Dear Sir, Ben Franklin Would Like to Add You to His Network". Smithsonian Magazine.
- Franklin, Benjamin (May 22, 1777). "Letter: From Benjamin Franklin to Richard Bache". Letter to Richard Bache. National Archives & Yale University.
- Franklin, Benjamin (May 5, 1779). "Letter: From Benjamin Franklin to Benjamin Vaughan". Letter to Benjamin Vaughan. National Archives & Yale University.
- Benjamin, Franklin (July 5, 1775). "Letter: Benjamin Franklin to William Strahan". Letter to William Strahan. National Archives, Library of Congress & Pierpont Morgan Library.
- Franklin, Benjamin (December 8, 1776). "Letter: From Benjamin Franklin to the Committee of Secret Correspondence". Letter to Committee of Secret Correspondence. National Archives.
- Franklin, Benjamin (March 31, 1778). "Letter: From Benjamin Franklin to Henry Laurens: Two letters". Letter to Henry Laurens. National Archives; Library of Congress.
- Bache, Richard (June 20, 1781). "Letter: To Benjamin Franklin from Richard Bache". Letter to Benjamin Franklin. National Archives & Historical Society of Pennsylvania.
- Franklin, Benjamin (September 13, 1781). "From Benjamin Franklin to Richard Bache". Letter to Richard Bache. National Archives; Bristol Rhode Island Historical Society.
- Bache, Richard (December 2, 1781). "To Benjamin Franklin from Richard Bache". Letter to Benjamin Franklin. National Archives; Historical Society of Pennsylvania.
- Franklin, William (July 22, 1784). "To Benjamin Franklin from William Franklin". Letter to Benjamin Franklin. American Philosophical Society; National Archives.
- Franklin, Benjamin (August 16, 1784). "From Benjamin Franklin to William Franklin, 16 August 1784". Letter to William Franklin. National Archives.

== Other works involving Franklin's writings ==
- Chambers, Robert; Chambers, William (1839). The life and miscellaneous writings of Benjamin Franklin. Edinburgh : W. and R. Chambers.
- Crane, Verner Winslow (2018). Benjamin Franklin's Letters to the Press, 1758–1775. University of North Carolina Press Books. ISBN 978-0-8078-39515.
- Franklin, Benjamin (1905). Ford, Worthington Chauncy (ed.). List of the Benjamin Franklin papers in the Library of Congress. Washington: Government Printing Office.
- I. Minis Hays, ed. (1908). Calendar of the papers of Benjamin Franklin in the library of the University of Pennsylvania. Being the appendix to the "Calendar of the papers of Benjamin Franklin in the library of the American philosophical society". Philadelphia, University of Pennsylvania.
- Franklin, Benjamin (1811). The complete works, in philosophy, politics and morals of the late Dr. Benjamin Franklin. Vol. I. London : Printed for Longman, Hurst, Rees, Orme, and Brown ..
- —— (1811). The complete works, in philosophy, politics and morals of the late Dr. Benjamin Franklin. Vol. II. London : Printed for Longman, Hurst, Rees, Orme, and Brown ..
- —— (1909). MacDonald, Will (ed.). Memoirs of the life & writings of Benjamin Franklin (autobiography). London : J. M. Dent; New York : E. P. Dutton.
- —— (1962). Donovan, Frank Robert (ed.). The Benjamin Franklin papers. New York, Dodd, Mead.
  (Not to be confused with the subject of this article: Covers Franklin's literary style, use of capitols, italics, contractions, etc.)
- —— (2003). Quotations of Benjamin Franklin. Bedford, Massachusetts: Applewood Books. ISBN 978-1-5570-99389.
- —— (1907). Smyth, Albert Henry (ed.). The writings of Benjamin Franklin. Vol. I. New York, London: The Macmillan Company, Ten volumes. ISBN 9780838301944.; Volume II, Volume III
- Sparks, Jared, ed. (1829–1830). The Diplomatic Correspondence of the American Revolution, being the letters of Benjamin Franklin, Silas Deane, John Adams, John Jay, Arthur Lee ... and others. Vol. I. Boston, Hale.
  Twelve volumes with numerous examples of Franklin's writings to and from the founders and other notable figures.
- —— (1836–1840). Sparks, Jared (ed.). The works of Benjamin Franklin; containing several political and historical tracts not included in any former edition — In Twelve volumes. Vol. I. Boston, Hillard, Gray, and Company.
- Van Doren, Carl (1947). Letters and papers of Benjamin Franklin and Richard Jackson 1753–1785. American Philosophical Society.
- —— (1891). "Unpublished Letters of Benjamin Franklin". The Pennsylvania Magazine of History and Biography. 15 (1). University of Pennsylvania Press: 35–40. JSTOR 20083407.
- —— (2010). Selected writings. New York : Fall River Press. ISBN 978-1-4351-37448.
- —— (1997). Autobiography, Poor Richard, and later writings : letters from London, 1757-1775, Paris, 1776–1785, Philadelphia, 1785–1790. New York : Library of America. ISBN 9781883011536.
