= Poor Richard's Almanack =

Yearly publication by Benjamin Franklin (1732–1758)

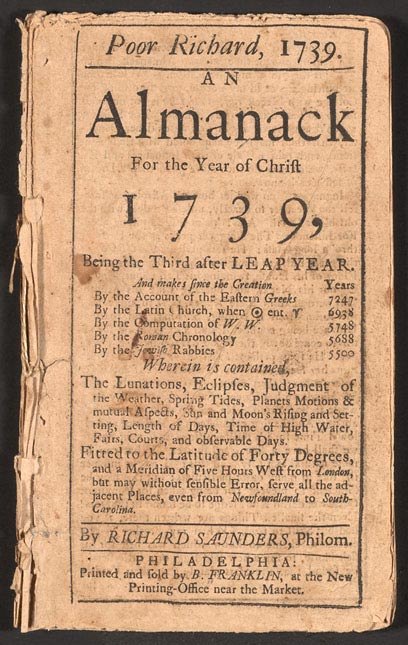
- 1739 edition of Poor Richard's Almanack
- Discipline: Weather, Proverbs, Entertainment, Astronomy, Enlightment Ideals and Advice
- Language: English

Publication details
- History: 1732-1758
- Publisher: Benjamin Franklin (British America)
- Frequency: Yearly
- ISO 4: Find out here

Links
- Journal homepage

Poor Richard's Almanack (sometimes spelled Almanac) was a yearly almanac published by Benjamin Franklin, who adopted the pseudonym of "Poor Richard" or "Richard Saunders" for this purpose. The publication appeared continually from 1732 to 1758. It sold exceptionally well for a pamphlet published in the Thirteen Colonies; print runs reached 10,000 per year.

Franklin, the American inventor, statesman, and accomplished publisher and printer, achieved success with Poor Richard's Almanack. Almanacks were very popular books in colonial America, offering a mixture of seasonal weather forecasts, practical household hints, puzzles, and other amusements. Poor Richard's Almanack was also popular for its extensive use of wordplay, and some of the witty phrases coined in the work survive in the contemporary American vernacular.

Poor Richard's Almanack (1750)

Hide not your Talents, they for Use were made.
What's a Sun-Dial in the shade!

— Richard Saunders (Benjamin Franklin)

== History ==
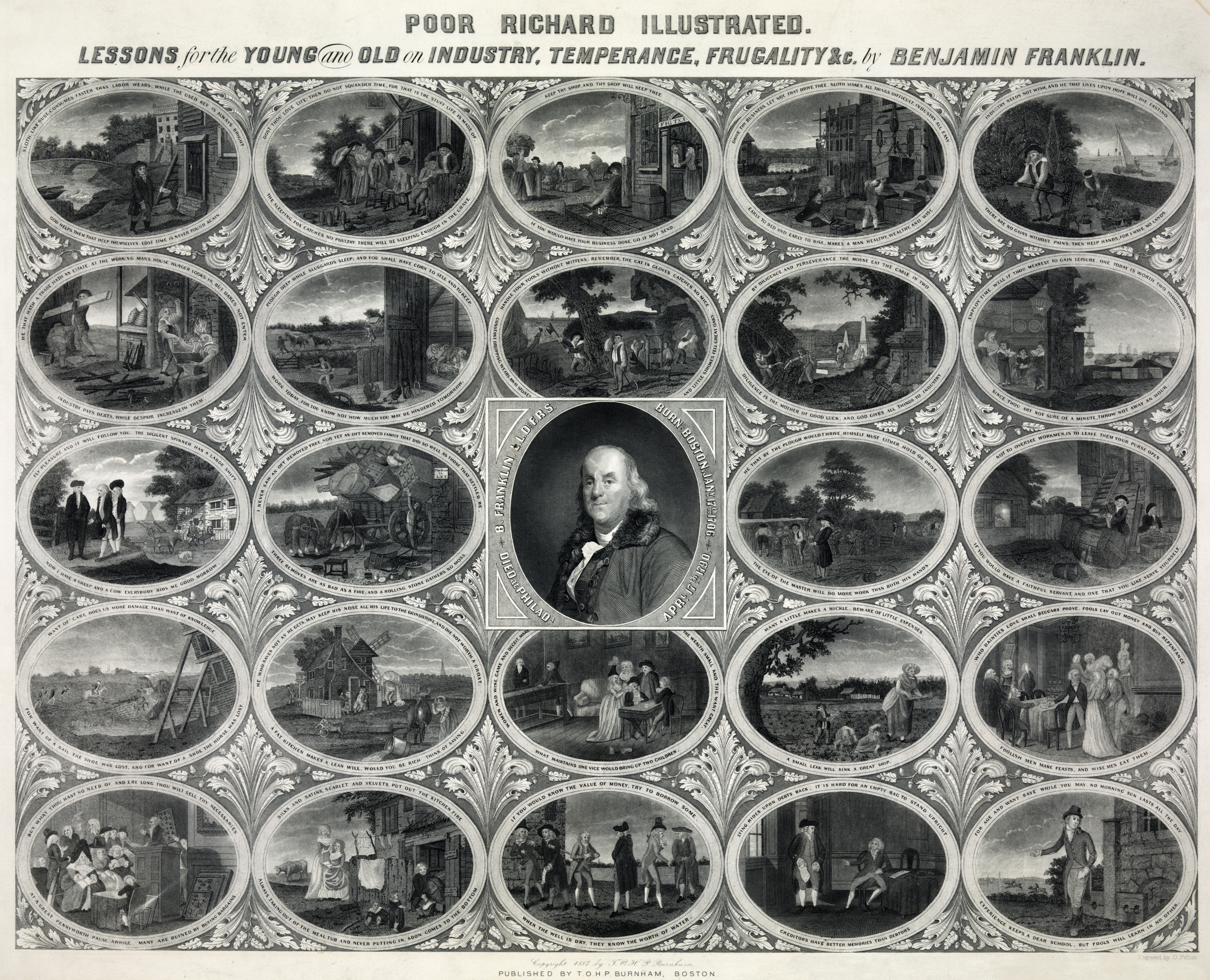
A nineteenth-century print based on Poor Richard's Almanack, showing the author surrounded by twenty-four illustrations of many of his best-known sayings

On December 28, 1732, Benjamin Franklin announced in The Pennsylvania Gazette that he had just printed and published the first edition of The Poor Richard, by Richard Saunders, Philomath. Franklin published the first Poor Richard's Almanack on December 28, 1732, and continued to publish new editions for 25 years, bringing him much economic success and popularity. The almanack sold as many as 10,000 copies a year. In 1735, upon the death of Franklin's brother, James, Franklin sent 500 copies of Poor Richard's to his widow for free, so that she could make money selling them.

== Contents ==
The Almanack contained the calendar, weather, poems, sayings, and astronomical and astrological information that a typical almanac of the period would contain. Franklin also included the occasional mathematical exercise, and the Almanack from 1750 features an early example of demographics. It is chiefly remembered, however, for being a repository of Franklin's proverbs, many of which live on in American English. These maxims typically counsel thrift and courtesy, with a dash of cynicism.

In the spaces that occurred between noted calendar days, Franklin included proverbial sentences about industry and frugality. Several of these sayings were borrowed from an earlier writer, Lord Halifax, many of whose aphorisms sprang from a "basic skepticism directed against the motives of men, manners, and the age." In 1757, Franklin made a selection of these and prefixed them to the almanac as the address of an old man to the people attending an auction. This was later published as The Way to Wealth, and was popular in both America and England.

Jill Lepore points out that "Franklin didn't write most of Poor Richard's proverbs. By his own guess, he wrote perhaps one out of every ten; the rest he found in books, especially anthologies like Thomas Fuller's 1732 Gnomologia: Adagies and Proverbs; Wise Sentences and Witty Sayings Ancient and Modern, Foreign and British. She adds that Franklin was adept at modifying and sharpening the proverbs he found, for example, Fuller had written, "A Man in Passion rides a horse that runs away with him", whereas Franklin converted it to, "A Man in a Passion rides a mad Horse."

== Poor Richard ==
Franklin borrowed the name "Richard Saunders" from the seventeenth-century author of Rider's British Merlin, a popular London almanac which continued to be published throughout the eighteenth century. Franklin created the Poor Richard persona based in part on Jonathan Swift's pseudonymous character, "Isaac Bickerstaff". In a series of three letters in 1708 and 1709, known as the Bickerstaff papers, "Bickerstaff" predicted the imminent death of astrologer and almanac maker John Partridge. Franklin's Poor Richard, like Bickerstaff, claimed to be a philomath and astrologer and, like Bickerstaff, predicted the deaths of actual astrologers who wrote traditional almanacs. In the early editions of Poor Richard's Almanack, predicting and falsely reporting the deaths of these astrologers—much to their dismay—was something of a running joke. However, Franklin's endearing character of "Poor" Richard Saunders, along with his wife Bridget, was ultimately used to frame (if comically) what was intended as a serious resource that people would buy year after year. To that end, the satirical edge of Swift's character is largely absent in Poor Richard. Richard was presented as distinct from Franklin himself, occasionally referring to the latter as his printer.

In later editions, the original Richard Saunders character gradually disappeared, replaced by a Poor Richard, who largely stood in for Franklin and his own practical scientific and business perspectives. By 1758, the original character was even more distant from the practical advice and proverbs of the almanac, which Franklin presented as coming from "Father Abraham," who in turn got his sayings from Poor Richard.

== Serialization ==
One of the appeals of the Almanack was that it contained various "news stories" in serial format, so that readers would purchase it year after year to find out what happened to the protagonists. One of the earliest of these was the "prediction" that the author's "good Friend and Fellow-Student, Mr. Titan Leeds" would die on October 17 of that year, followed by the rebuttal of Mr. Leeds himself that he would die, not on the 17th, but on October 26. Appealing to his readers, Franklin urged them to purchase the next year or two or three or four editions to show their support for his prediction. The following year, Franklin expressed his regret that he was too ill to learn whether he or Leeds was correct. Nevertheless, the ruse had its desired effect: people purchased the Almanack to find out who was correct. (Later editions of the Almanack would claim that Leeds had died and that the person claiming to be Leeds was an impostor; Leeds, in fact, died in 1738, which prompted Franklin to applaud the supposed impostor for ending his ruse.)

== Criticism ==
For some writers the content of the Almanack became inextricably linked with Franklin's character—and not always to favorable effect. Both Nathaniel Hawthorne and Herman Melville caricatured the Almanack—and Franklin by extension—in their writings, while James Russell Lowell, reflecting on the public unveiling in Boston of a statue to honor Franklin, wrote:

... we shall find out that Franklin was born in Boston, and invented being struck with lightning and printing and the Franklin medal, and that he had to move to Philadelphia because great men were so plenty in Boston that he had no chance, and that he revenged himself on his native town by saddling it with the Franklin stove, and that he discovered the almanac, and that a penny saved is a penny lost, or something of the kind.

The Almanack was also a reflection of the social norms and social mores of his times, rather than a philosophical document setting a path for new-freedoms, as the works of Franklin's contemporaries, Thomas Jefferson, John Adams, and Thomas Paine were. Historian Howard Zinn offers, as an example, the adage "Let thy maidservant be faithful, strong, and homely" as indication of Franklin's belief in the legitimacy of controlling the sexual lives of servants for the economic benefit of their masters.

At least one modern biographer has published the claim that Franklin "stole", not borrowed, the name of Richard Saunders from the deceased astrologer-doctor. Franklin also "borrowed—apparently without asking—and adapted the title of an almanac his brother James Franklin was publishing at Newport: Poor Robin's Almanack (itself appropriated from a seventeenth-century almanac published under the same title in London)".

== Cultural impact ==
King Louis XVI of France gave a ship to John Paul Jones who renamed it after the Almanack's author—Bonhomme Richard, or "Goodman (that is, a polite title of address for a commoner who is not a member of the gentry) Richard" (the first of several US warships so named). The Almanack was translated into Italian, along with the Pennsylvania State Constitution (which Franklin helped draft) at the establishment of the Cisalpine Republic. It was also twice translated into French, reprinted in Great Britain in broadside for ease of posting, and was distributed by members of the clergy to poor parishioners. It was the first work of English literature to be translated into Slovene, translated in 1812 by Janez Nepomuk Primic (1785–1823).

The Almanack also had a strong cultural and economic impact in the years following publication. In Pennsylvania, changes in monetary policy in regard to foreign expenses were evident for years after the issuing of the Almanack. Later writers such as Noah Webster were inspired by the almanac, and it went on to influence other publications of this type such as the Old Farmer's Almanac.

Sociologist Max Weber considered Poor Richard's Almanack and Franklin to reflect the "spirit of capitalism" in a form of "classical" purity. This is why he filled the pages of Chapter 2 of his 1905 book The Protestant Ethic and the Spirit of Capitalism with illustrative quotations from Franklin's almanacks.

Numerous farmer's almanacs trace their format and tradition to Poor Richard's Almanack; the Old Farmer's Almanac, for instance, has included a picture of Franklin on its cover since 1851.

In 1958, the United States mobilized its naval forces in response to an attack on Vice President Richard Nixon in Caracas, Venezuela. The operation was code-named "Poor Richard".

== See also ==
- The Papers of Benjamin Franklin

== Bibliography ==
- Arch, Stephen Carl (July 1995). "Writing a Federalist self: Alexander Graydon's memoirs of a life". William and Mary Quarterly. 3rd Series. 52 (3). Omohundro Institute of Early American History and Culture: 415–432. doi:10.2307/2947293. JSTOR 2947293.
- Bellis, Mary. "Benjamin Franklin and his Times". About.com.
- Dauer, Manning J. (August 1976). "The Impact of the American independence and the American Constitution: 1776–1848; with a Brief Epilogue". The Journal of Politics. 38 (3). Cambridge University Press: 37–55. doi:10.2307/2129573. JSTOR 2129573. S2CID 154053226.
- Franklin, Benjamin (2005). Lemay, J. A. Leo (ed.). Benjamin Franklin: Autobiography, Poor Richard: Autobiography, Poor Richard, and Later Writings. New York: Library of America. ISBN 1-883011-53-1.
- "Franklin: Poor Richard's Almanack". 100 Years of Carnegie. Men of Carnegie. Bucknell University. 2004.
- Goodrich, Rev. Charles A. (1829). Lives of the Signers to the Declaration of Independence. W. Reed & co.
- Hancock, David (Autumn 1998). "Commerce and Conversation in the Eighteenth-Century Atlantic: The invention of Madeira Wine". Journal of Interdisciplinary History. 29 (2): 197–219. doi:10.1162/002219598551670. S2CID 143289729.
- Isaacson, Walter (2004). Benjamin Franklin: an American life. New York: Simon & Schuster. ISBN 978-0-6848-07614.
- Kneeland, John; Wheeler, Henry Nathan (1891). Masterpieces of American Literature. United States: Houghton Mifflin & Co.
- Laughter, Frank (1999–2003). "Golden nuggets from U.S. history: Benjamin Franklin and Poor Richard's Almanac". Laughter genealogy. Archived from the original on 2007-09-29.
- Lena, Alberto (30 January 2003). "Poor Richard's Almanack". The Literary Encyclopedia.
- Lepore, Jill (January 20, 2008). "The Creed: What Poor Richard cost Benjamin Franklin". The New Yorker.
- Miles, Richard D. (Summer 1957). "The American image of Benjamin Franklin". American Quarterly. 9 (2). The Johns Hopkins University Press: 117–143. doi:10.2307/2710628. JSTOR 2710628.
- Miller, C. William (1961). "Franklin's "Poor Richard Almanacs": Their Printing and Publication". Studies in Bibliography. 14. Bibliographical Society of the University of Virginia: 97–115. JSTOR 40371300.
- Mulder, William (December 1979). "Seeing 'New Englandly': Planes of Perception in Emily Dickinson and Robert Frost". The New England Quarterly. 52 (4). The New England Quarterly, Inc.: 550–559. doi:10.2307/365757. JSTOR 365757.
- Newcomb, Robert (November 1957). "Benjamin Franklin and Montaigne". Modern Language Notes. 72 (7). The Johns Hopkins University Press: 489–491. doi:10.2307/3043511. JSTOR 3043511.
- Newcomb, Robert (June 1955). "Poor Richard's debt to Lord Halifax". PMLA. 70 (3). Modern Language Association: 535–539. doi:10.2307/460054. JSTOR 460054. S2CID 163553029.
- Pasles, Paul C. (June–July 2001). "The lost squares of Dr. Franklin: Ben Franklin's missing squares and the secret of the magic circle". The American Mathematical Monthly. 108 (6). Mathematical Association of America: 489–511. doi:10.2307/2695704. JSTOR 2695704.
- Ross, John F. (September 1940). "The character of Poor Richard: Its source and alteration". PMLA. 55 (3). Modern Language Association: 785–794. doi:10.2307/458740. JSTOR 458740. S2CID 163353553.
- Smith, Mark M. (February 1996). "Time, slavery and plantation capitalism in the ante-bellum American south". Past and Present (150): 142–168. doi:10.1093/past/150.1.142.
- Wilson, Pip (2006). "A Calendar History". Archived from the original on 2007-03-09.
- Zinn, Howard (1980). A People's History of the United States. New York: Harper Collins Publishers.

See also:

- Franklin, Benjamin (1976) [1733-1758]. Brooks, Van Wyck (ed.). Poor Richard: The Almanacks for the years 1733-1758. New York: Paddington Press. ISBN 978-0846701200.
