= The Way to Wealth =

Essay by Benjamin Franklin from 1758

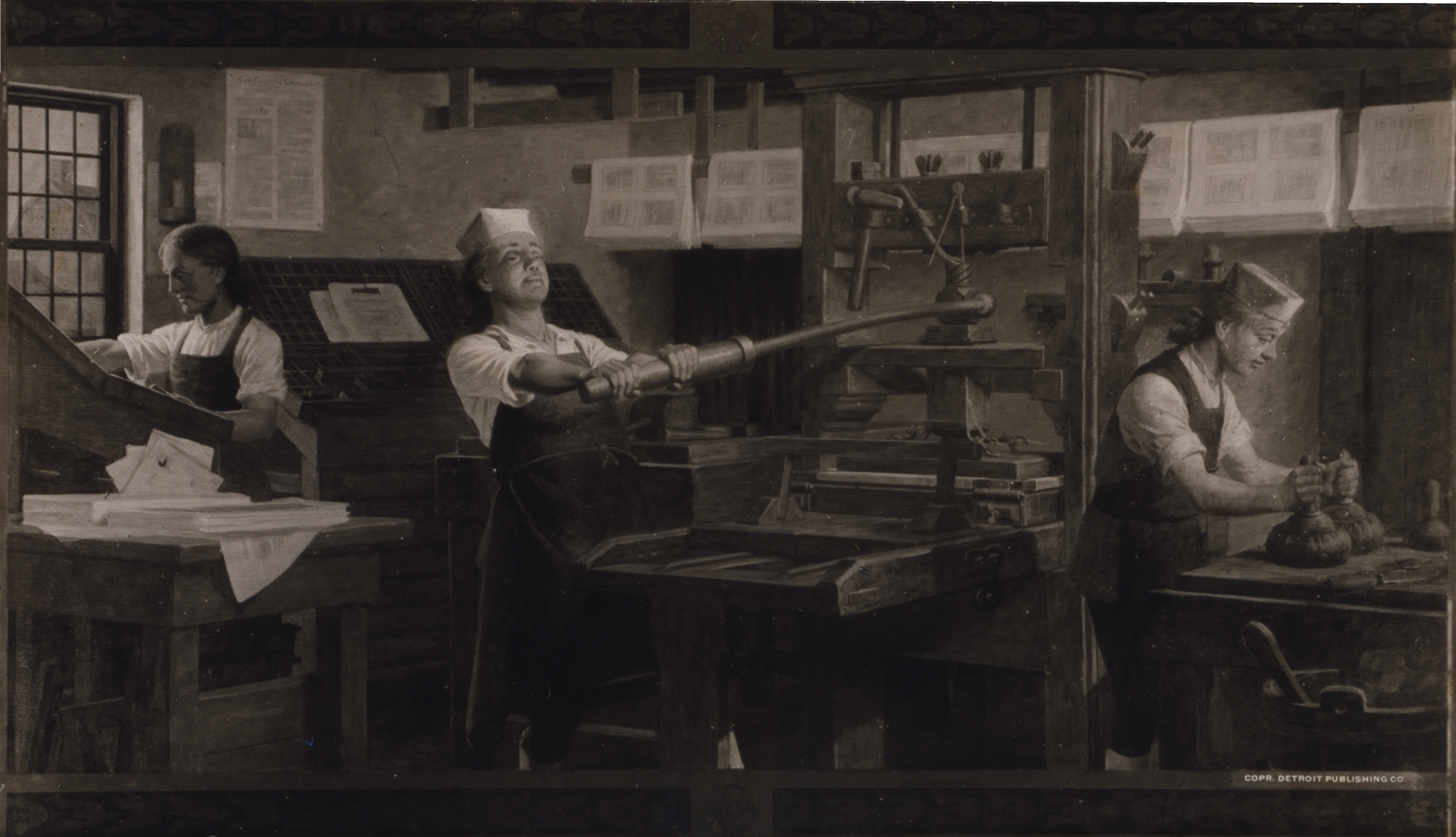
- Benjamin Franklin at a printing press
- Author: Benjamin Franklin
- Publication date: 1758 "The Way to Wealth"; Read by Bob Gonzalez for LibriVox Audio 0:23:43 (full text)

The Way to Wealth or Father Abraham's Sermon is an essay written by Benjamin Franklin in 1758. It is a collection of adages and advice presented in Poor Richard's Almanack during its first 25 years of publication, organized into a speech given by "Father Abraham" to a group of people. Many of the phrases Father Abraham quotes continue to be familiar today. The essay's advice is based on the themes of work ethic and frugality.

Some phrases from the almanac quoted in The Way to Wealth include:

- "There are no gains, without pains"
- "One today is worth two tomorrows"
- "A life of leisure and a life of laziness are two things"
- "Get what you can, and what you get hold"
- "Sloth, like rust, consumes faster than labor wears, while the used key is always bright"
- "Have you somewhat to do tomorrow, do it today"
- "The eye of a master will do more work than both his hands"
- "Early to bed, and early to rise, makes a man healthy, wealthy and wise"
- "For want of a nail..."
