= Rider's British Merlin =

1656 Almanac

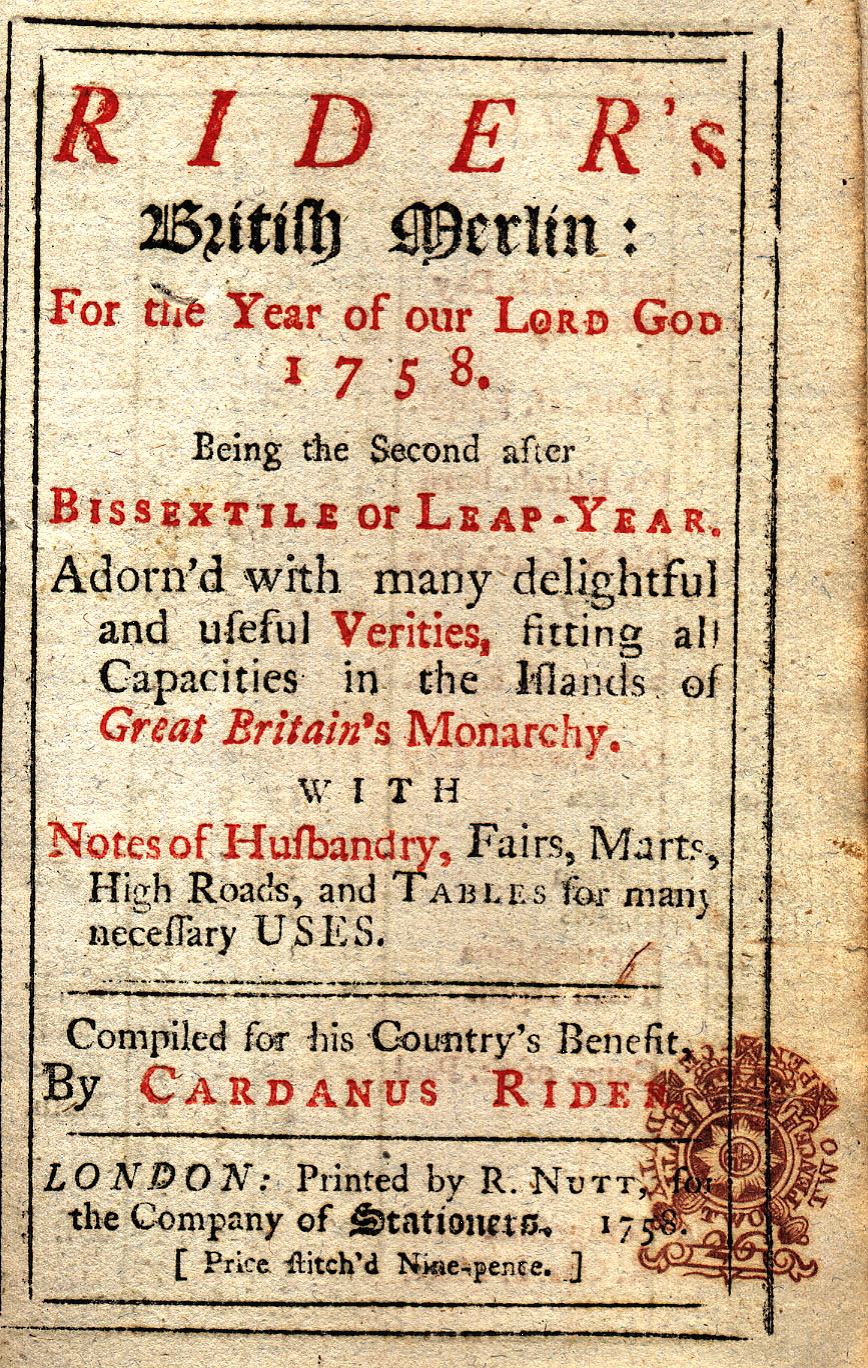
Title page of Rider's British Merlin 1758.

Rider's British Merlin was one of the earliest almanacs to be published, issued from 1656 until at least 1837.

== Content ==
The almanac contained the calendar, weather, and astronomical and astrological information that a typical almanac of the period would contain. The pages for each month of the year were accompanied by advice on what, and what not to eat and drink, and otherwise how to keep in good health. There were horticultural notes with abundant attention paid to herbs, fruit and vegetables.

The lengthiest sections of this little book listed annual fairs in England and Wales of fixed and moveable date. The first would generally be associated with a saint's day, while the second would be of the type "second Monday in October". This list of town names and dates represented important information in the days before Agricultural Advisers, Trade Fairs and Job Offices, when the fairs played an important role not only in buying and selling, but also in exhibiting innovations in husbandry, in information exchange and in the hiring of labour.

== "Rider" ==
It is generally held that Cardanus Rider is a pseudonym, and near-anagram: the letters rearrange as Ric_ard Saunder_. Richard Saunders was an English physician and astrologer, born in 1613, and who died (sources differ) either in 1675, 1687, or 1692.

The National Archives in London hold a book by Saunders on palmistry, with horoscopes; also attributed to him is The Astrological Judgment and Practice of Physick, published in 1677, although the fact that it includes charts from as early as 1616 to 1618 has led doubts to be cast on the actual authorship. Be that as it may, its subject matter was dear to the heart of "Cardanus Rider"; it stands as one of the earliest astro-medical treatises in the English language. Using the terminology of his day, the writer speaks of humours and winds, of conditions hot, cold or dry, of the cholerick and melancholy, of illnesses produced by the planets in the various signs of the zodiac, when to administer medicines based on planetary hours, and much more.
