= Albert Henry Smyth =

American history professor (1863–1907)

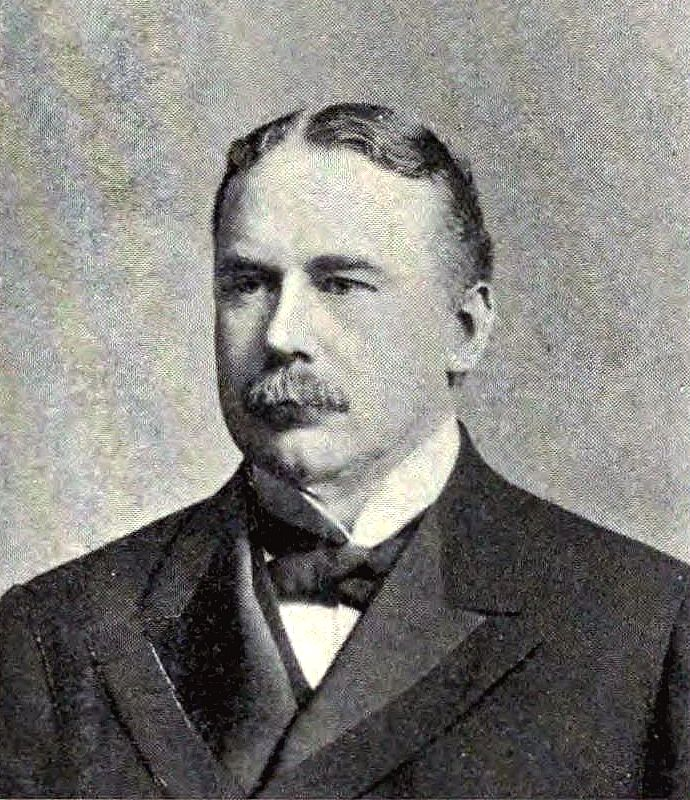
- Smyth in 1902
- Born: June 18, 1863; Philadelphia, Pennsylvania, U.S.
- Died: May 4, 1907 (aged 43); Germantown, Philadelphia, U.S.
- Resting place: West Laurel Hill Cemetery, Bala Cynwyd, Pennsylvania
- Known for: Editor of the papers of Benjamin Franklin; Discovered hundreds of Franklin's missing letters, first to publish them

Signature
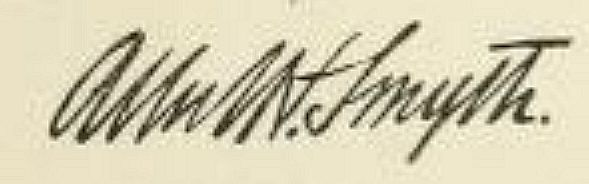

Albert Henry Smyth (June 18, 1863 – May 4, 1907) was a professor of history, writer, English teacher, editor, and a member and curator of the American Philosophical Society. Smyth is widely noted among historians for editing and publishing the papers of Benjamin Franklin, including hundreds of letters and papers he discovered in private collections in America and Europe which had never before been published, with many involving Franklin's scientific pursuits, and for also restoring original spelling and grammar used by Franklin, which was sometimes changed and published by a previous editor, before he published his ten-volume work of Franklin's papers in 1905–1907.

== Early life and education ==
Smyth was born on June 18, 1863, in Philadelphia. Little is known of his boy-hood days. His parents were William Clarke Smyth and Adelaide (Suplee) Smyth. He attended the public schools in Philadelphia and graduated from Central High School in 1882. In 1887 Smyth became a professor of English literature at Central High.

== Career ==
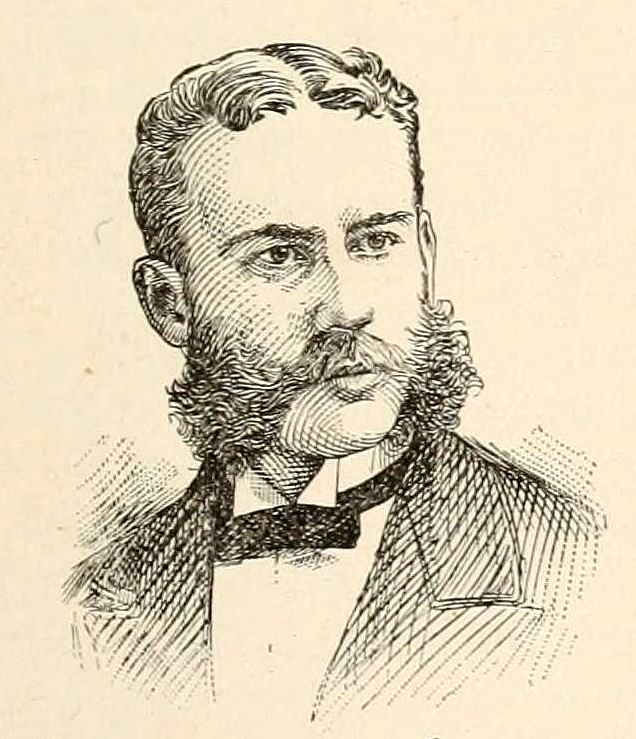
Smyth in earlier years

For two years Smyth worked for various local newspapers, and some time as an assistant librarian in the Mercantile Library in Philadelphia, from 1884 to 1885. In 1885 he functioned cataloging books at the Johns Hopkins University, Baltimore, Md., where he had the opportunity to enroll in various seminar courses, and in February 1887 received a Bachelor of Arts degree (extra ordinem). For his Master's thesis he wrote, Shakespeare's Pericles and Apollonius of Tyre which was a study in Comparative Literature. Smyth's thesis was read before the American Philosophical Society and was printed in volume thirty-seven of the Society's journal, Proceedings of the American Philosophical Society. When it was reprinted in I898, it received much praise from Shakespearean critics in America and Europe, and is considered a "monument of his learning and critical ability".

In 1883-1884 he was the editor and publisher of Shakespeariana, a monthly magazine, which became widely acclaimed among Shakespearian scholars. In May, 1886, he was a professor of English literature in the Philadelphia Central High School and in 1895 he became the department head of the English language and literature curriculum.

On May 20, 1887, Smyth was elected a member of the American Philosophical Society where he was constantly active and served as its curator. It was at the Society where he became familiar with their enormous collection of Benjamin Franklin's papers. Smyth was also elected to membership in many prominent scientific societies in America. During his research he discovered many missing leaflets to existing letters from Benjamin Franklin and was able to restore many mutilated pages.

In 1887 Smyth represented the American Philosophical Society in Glasgow, Scotland, and delivered a Latin oration at the celebration at Glasgow University's forty-fifth anniversary.

Smyth was also an admirer of Bayard Taylor, an accomplished poet and writer who lived in Philadelphia. In his 1896 biography of Taylor, Smyth gives a definitive account of Taylor's literary career.

=== Benjamin Franklin's papers ===
From 1905 to 1907 Smyth, under the auspices of the American Philosophical Society, was the editor of Benjamin Franklin's many letters and manuscripts, and edited and published 385 lost letters and other works that had never before been published. They are included in a ten volume work, entitled The writings of Benjamin Franklin. Smyth, like editors John Bigelow and Jared Sparks before him worked individually, with limited financial resources, unlike the editors involved with the latest on-going publication from APS and Yale who have the benefit of generous financial support for such an involved and large project. In the preface of volume one he assures his readers that,

"Every document here reprinted has been copied faithfully from the original;
every point, capital letter, and eccentricity of spelling being loyally preserved."

Smyth included an index which is considered "so complete and exhaustive" that it allows researches and historians easy inquiry into many of items outlined in Franklin's wide range of writings, i.e. under subject, place, correspondent or event. Included among the various writings are Smyth's comprehensive footnotes, touching on related history and many of Franklin's correspondents.

Smyth's editorial efforts and publication of Franklin's papers are considered his greatest work and as an important tribute to Franklin's 200th anniversary of birth, and has been acclaimed and well received by the American Philosophical Society, founded by Franklin, and by other societies he founded. The ten volumes of The Writings of Benjamin Franklin is expected to be a "lasting monument" of Professor Smyth's research and persistent efforts. He discovered new material in America and in Europe consisting of 385 letters and 40 papers, all in Franklin's hand, which were never before printed by any previous editor. Smyth corrected more than two thousand errors that occurred in earlier editions, and restored much of the text that was altered by Jared Sparks in his mistaken notion that he was improving Franklin's racy and dynamic English.

Smyth discovered new material in private and public collections, and in those recently acquired by the Library of the University of Pennsylvania, as well as in public archives on both sides of the Atlantic. He also located papers that were in the collections which had never before been consulted by any previous editor of Franklin's writings. He gave a complete account of the damaged papers due to age and neglect, which are now in safe keeping in the Library of the American Philosophical Society, Library of Congress and in the library of the University of Pennsylvania.

John Bigelow, one of the leading authorities on Franklin in his day, and the man who rescued Franklin's original manuscript of his famous Autobiography from obscurity, wrote of Professor Smyth's work and effort on Franklin's papers, " The development of the scientific side of Franklin will be new to the general reader, and the lack of it was perhaps the most conspicuous deficiency to all previous collections." Franklin biographer Walter Isaacson notes that until The Papers of Benjamin Franklin began and continues to be published by Yale University and the American Philosophical Society, beginning in 1954, and expected to reach some 47 volumes, Smyth's ten-volume work was the leading definitive collection of Franklin's papers.

== Final days and legacy ==
Devoting his life to literary and cultural pursuits, Smyth never married. In 1906 Smyth traveled abroad to Paris where he was decorated with the insignia of the Legion of Honor by the French government when he spoke with "marked distinction" as the representative of the United States at a dedication of a statue of Franklin. He had intended to author the life of Franklin and to edit the writings of George Washington. He died, however, on May 4, 1907, in Germantown, Pennsylvania, at the relatively early age of 43 from Bright's disease (nephritis). On May 7 Joseph Rosengarten on behalf of The American Philosophical Association paid a tribute to Smyth by reading a Treatise of his life and involvement as a historian and member of the Association noting that, "His services to this Society were constant and valuable." Smyth's last completed work was his edited edition of The Autobiography of Benjamin Franklin, published in 1907, just after his death. In the preface, Smyth, as a former teacher, praises Franklin's autobiography in that, "It contains lessons of wisdom and encouragement, and it should be an inspiration to every youthful reader."

A portrait of Smyth painted by James B. Sword, hangs on display at the Central High School in Philadelphia.

== Works ==
- Smyth, Albert (1887). "American Literature in the Class-Room". Transactions and Proceedings of the Modern Language Association of America. 3. Modern Language Association: 238–244. doi:10.2307/456027. JSTOR 456027.
- —— (1895). Autobiography of Benjamin Franklin. Philadelphia : Eldredge & Brother.
- —— (1896). Bayard Taylor. Boston, Houghton, Mifflin.
- —— (1892). The Philadelphia magazines and their contributors, 1741-1850. Philadelphia, R. M. Lindsay.
- —— (1898). Shakespeare's Pericles and Apollonius of Tyre.
- —— (1907). The poems of Bayard Taylor. New York, T. Y. Crowell & co.
- Franklin, Benjamin (1907). —— (ed.). The writings of Benjamin Franklin. Vol. I. New York, London: The Macmillan Company, Ten volumes. ISBN 9780838301944.
- Franklin, Benjamin (1907). —— (ed.). The autobiography of Benjamin Franklin. New York, American book company.

== See also ==
- Founding Fathers of the United States

== Bibliography ==
- Edmonds, Franklin Spencer (1902). History of the Central High School of Philadelphia. Philadelphia : Lippincott.
- Franklin, Benjamin (1907). Smyth, Albert Henry (ed.). The writings of Benjamin Franklin. Vol. I. New York, London: The Macmillan Company, Ten volumes. ISBN 9780838301944.
- Isaacson, Walter (2004). Benjamin Franklin : an American life. New York : Simon & Schuster. ISBN 978-0-6848-07614.
- Johnson, Rossiter (1906). Biographical dictionary of America. Vol. IX. Boston, American Biographical Society.
- Labaree, Leonard W.; Bell, Whitfield J. Jr. (December 19, 1957). "The Papers of Benjamin Franklin: A Progress Report". Proceedings of the American Philosophical Society. 101 (6). American Philosophical Society: 532–534. JSTOR 985521.
- Lingelbach, Anna Lane (1935). Dictionary of American biography. Vol. XVII.
  New York: Charles Scribner's Sons.
- Rosengarten, Joseph G. (October–December 1907). "Biographical Notice of Albert Henry Smyth". Proceedings of the American Philosophical Society. 47 (187). American Philosophical Society: i–x. JSTOR 983483.
- Franklin, Benjamin (1907). Smyth, Albert Henry (ed.). The writings of Benjamin Franklin. Vol. I. New York; London: The Macmillan Company. ISBN 9780838301944.
- Smyth, Albert Henry (1898). Shakespeare's Pericles and Apollonius of Tyre. The American Philosophical Society.
- Smyth, Albert Henry (December 1898). "Shakespeare's Pericles and Apollonius of Tyre". Proceedings of the American Philosophical Society. 37 (158). American Philosophical Society: 206–312. JSTOR 983853.
- "Prof. Albert H. Smyth Dead". The Baltimore Sun. Baltimore, Maryland. May 5, 1907.
