= Whitfield Bell Jr. =

American author and historian (1914–2009)

Whitfield Jenks Bell Jr. (December 3, 1914 - January 2, 2009) was an American author and an expert on early American history, science, the American Philosophical Society and Benjamin Franklin and his writings.

== Early life ==
Bell was born in Newburgh, New York and grew up in suburban Philadelphia. He went to school at Lower Merion High School (PA) and graduated in 1931.

== Education and career ==
After Bell graduated Lower Merion High School, he enrolled in Dickinson College. He began studying law but did not complete his classes, deciding instead to pursue his interest in history.

Bell joined the Freemasons' Cumberland Star Lodge of Carlisle and achieved the status of Master Mason. He wrote the history of the Lodge to mark its 150th anniversary. Bell earned his doctorate in history in 1947, from the University of Pennsylvania.

Bell tried to enlist in the Army and the Navy when the United States entered the World War II, but was rejected due to poor eyesight. He drove an ambulance in North Africa, Italy and Germany. He also helped to liberate the Bergen-Belsen concentration camp.

Bell taught history at Dickinson (1945–1950) and was appointed to the Boyd Lee Spahr endowed Chair of American History in 1950. In the same year, he edited the first volume of Spahr Lectures, Bulwark of Liberty. In 1953-54 he worked as a visiting editor of William and Mary Quarterly in Williamsburg, Virginia. He moved to work at the American Philosophical Society in 1955 to work on its growing collection of Benjamin Franklin letters and writings.

Bell's career culminated as executive officer and librarian of the American Philosophical Society.

Bell retired in 1983 and thereafter, from 1984 to 1991, he was employed as a curator, during which time he continued to perform his own research, and published more than one hundred articles involving book reviews, and encyclopedia articles which he had published in six different works.

== Awards and recognition ==
Bell's contributions were recognized by the American Association for the History of Medicine 1996 lifetime achievement award.

A volume of works dedicated to Whitfield Bell was published in 1986.

Bell gave nine interviews to Michael J. Birkner, a professor of history at Gettysburg College.

== See also ==
- The Papers of Benjamin Franklin

== Selected bibliography ==
- Bell, Whitfield Jenks. Early American science: needs and opportunities for study. Russell & Russell, 1955. 1971 reprint. LCCN 78139902.
- Bell, Whitfield Jenks. John Morgan: continental doctor. University of Pennsylvania Press, 1965. LCCN 65-12020; Whitfield j. Bell, Jr (11 November 2016). 2016 pbk reprint. University of Pennsylvania Press. ISBN 978-1-5128-0031-9.
- Franklin, Benjamin, Leonard Woods Labaree, Whitfield Jenks Bell Jr, and Whitfield Jenks Bell. The Papers of Benjamin Franklin. New Haven, CT: Yale University Press, 1966.
- Bell, Whitfield Jenks. Patriot-improvers: biographical sketches of members of the American Philosophical Society, volume one, 1743–1768. Volume 226, Memoirs of the American Philosophical Society. American Philosophical Society. 1997. ISBN 0871692260. LCCN 97044313; xx+531 pages
  - Bell, Whitfield Jenks. Patriot-improvers: biographical sketches of members of the American Philosophical Society, volume two, 1768. 1999. ASIN B007O3Z7KO.
