= The Dolley Madison Digital Edition =

The Dolley Madison Digital Edition (DMDE) is a digital comprehensive edition of the correspondence and ancillary documents of Dolley Payne Todd Madison. Rotunda, the electronic imprint of the University of Virginia Press, published the first installment of the edition in 2004; the final installment will appear in the Fall of 2021. The DMDE includes over 3,500 documents and 5,000 unique identifications of people, places, terms, and titles. The edition won the 2020 Lyman H. Butterfield Award from the Association for Documentary Editing. The DMDE was the first publication of Rotunda and is now available as part of Rotunda's American Founding Era Collection, where it can be included in searches across the entire collection alongside the papers of the founders.

== Protocols ==
The DMDE attempts to identify every person, place, organization, and citation that is mentioned in the correspondence (or other documents such as newspaper articles, legal documents, and invitations). Annotations are provided by associating names to text. A list is provided in the left hand margin to facilitate searching. In addition, the DMDE provides editorial notes to explain issues that transcend individual letters but have not been the subject of serious historical research and writing. All documents are marked up in XML and conform to TEI.P5. Readers can both browse and search the collection or pull up the complete set of annotations, called in this edition the "glossary."

== History ==
The DMDE was created by Holly Cowan Shulman working in close collaboration with the Papers of James Madison and Rotunda. The goal of the edition was and remains twofold: to provide a modern edition of Dolley Madison's correspondence; and to provide a model for a born-digital documentary edition in the field of history. There are two previous editions of letters of Dolley Madison. The first, edited by her great-niece, Lucia B. Cutts, was originally published in 1886. The second, edited by a Washington historian, Allen C. Clark, was published in 1914. Both are highly selected and heavily bowdlerized. The DMDE was preceded by a selective edition edited by Shulman and David B. Mattern, senior associate editor of the Papers of James Madison: The Selected Letters of Dolley Payne Madison, published in 2003 by the University of Virginia Press.

The project director is Holly Cowan Shulman, and the managing editor is Mary MacNeil.

The DMDE was funded by the National Endowment for the Humanities, Virginia Humanities, and the National Historical Publications and Records Commission.

== Reception ==
The DMDE has been used by both academic and popular writers. Scholars who have cited the DMDE include historians such as Catherine Allgor, David Lynn Holmes, Annette Gordon-Reed, Woody Holton, Caroline Winterer, and Douglas Houpt; and specialists in Digital Humanities such as Johanna Drucker and Lauren F. Klein. Popular historians who have used the edition include Cokie Roberts, Elise K. Kirk, Elizabeth Dowling Taylor, and Jon Meacham.

The Dolley Madison Digital Edition won the Lyman H. Butterfield Award from the Association for Documentary Editing. In 2021 it was nominated for the J. Franklin Jameson Award from the American Historical Association.
