= The Papers of Abraham Lincoln =

Archive of the writings of Abraham Lincoln

The Papers of Abraham Lincoln Established 1985 Location Springfield, Illinois Director Daniel Worthington Sponsors Abraham Lincoln Presidential Library and Museum, Abraham Lincoln Association website http://www.papersofabrahamlincoln.org

The Papers of Abraham Lincoln is a documentary editing project dedicated to identifying, imaging, transcribing, annotating, and publishing online all documents written by or to Abraham Lincoln during his lifetime (1809–1865).

== Directors ==
- Dr. Daniel Worthington, 2018–present
- Dr. Samuel Wheeler (acting), 2016–2018
- Daniel W. Stowell, 2000–2016
- Dr. Cullom Davis, 1988–2000 (Lincoln Legal Papers)

== Abraham Lincoln's papers ==
Abraham Lincoln is one of America's most famous politicians and is consistently ranked as one of the greatest presidents ever to occupy the White House. Any scholarly study of his life is reliant on his written words to understand his thoughts, motives, and actions. After his father's death, Robert Todd Lincoln gathered a large collection of papers and entrusted their organization to David Davis, who was assisted by Lincoln's private secretaries John G. Nicolay and John Hay. Nicolay and Hay subsequently drew upon these nearly 20,000 documents to write their ten-volume Lincoln biography published in 1890. Robert Lincoln deposited this collection of papers at the Library of Congress in 1919 and formally deeded them to the library in January 1923, with the stipulation that they remain sealed until 21 years after his own death. The records were finally opened to the public in 1947.

While the Robert Todd Lincoln Collection of Abraham Lincoln Papers at the Library of Congress is the largest single repository collection of Lincoln documents, thousands of other items are located in public and private repositories around the world.

Previous attempts to locate and publish Lincoln documents include Nicolay and Hay's 1905 Complete Works of Abraham Lincoln, consisting of 12 volumes; Gilbert A. Tracy and Francis H. Allen's 1917 Uncollected Letters of Abraham Lincoln; Rufus Rockwell Wilson's 1947 Uncollected Works of Abraham Lincoln: His Letters, Addresses and Other Papers; and Paul Angle's 1930 New Letters and Papers of Lincoln.

In the 1930s, the Abraham Lincoln Association began collecting photostats of Lincoln documents and by 1945 began drafting plans that eventually culminated in The Collected Works of Abraham Lincoln, edited by Roy P. Basler, Marion Dolores Pratt, and Lloyd A. Dunlap. It was published in 8 volumes (plus an index) between 1953 and 1955, with two supplemental volumes published in 1974 and 1990.

Basler's Collected Works has become a standard resource for Lincoln and Civil War scholarship, but it suffers from limitations and omissions. Collected Works did not include incoming correspondence to Lincoln, which denies the reader important context. New technology and the development of documentary editing as a discipline allows for more faithful renditions of the texts. And in the nearly 60 years since the publication of Collected Works, many new Lincoln documents have been discovered, providing new opportunities for historical scholarship. With these reasons likely in mind, Lincoln biographer David Herbert Donald assessed, "Though Roy Basler and his associates did an excellent job of editing Lincoln's writings a generation ago, I believe that it is time for a new, complete, updated edition of his works."

== Project purpose and history ==
From 1985 to 2000, the Lincoln Legal Papers searched county, state, and federal records for documents relating to legal cases handled by Lincoln or his partnerships. Images of more than 96,000 documents, arranged by case, were published in DVD-ROM format as The Law Practice of Abraham Lincoln: Complete Documentary Edition (University of Illinois Press, 2000). In 2009, that publication went online as The Law Practice of Abraham Lincoln: Second Edition. It features all of the documents from the DVD edition, plus an additional 45 cases, 12 non-litigation activities, and nearly 1,300 new documents, as well as updated color images of more than 1,500 documents, many written by Lincoln.

The selective 4-volume print edition of this series, The Papers of Abraham Lincoln: Legal Documents and Cases (University of Virginia Press, 2008), provides transcribed and annotated documents from 65 of Lincoln's most significant and representative cases, with additional chapters documenting his travels on the Eighth Judicial Circuit and other aspects of Lincoln's life as a lawyer.

In 2001, the Lincoln Legal Papers was expanded beyond Lincoln's legal practice and transformed into The Papers of Abraham Lincoln. The project is a department within the Research Division of the Abraham Lincoln Presidential Library and Museum. Beginning in 2003, teams of researchers visited private and public repositories around the U.S. and in several foreign countries, searching for, identifying, and scanning thousands of documents. The Papers of Abraham Lincoln has identified over 70,000 documents written by and to Lincoln in repositories and collections around the world.

The major purpose of the Papers of Abraham Lincoln is "to preserve all of Lincoln's correspondence (both incoming and outgoing) and speeches with digital images, to provide authoritative transcriptions of those documents, to offer historical context for each document through annotation, and to make the images and transcriptions freely available over the Internet." In 2003, Richard Norton Smith, presidential historian and founding director of the Abraham Lincoln Presidential Library and Museum, said, "It is hard to imagine a more valuable or enduring contribution to Lincoln studies than a new, comprehensive, scholarly and widely accessible edition of his papers."

== Digital library ==
April 19, 2018 marked the beginning of online publication of the Papers of Abraham Lincoln. It is composed of a Digital Edition and a Digital Archive.

The Digital Edition includes transcriptions and images of documents written by or to Abraham Lincoln, presented in a searchable format. All documents in the Digital Edition are transcribed, single-proofed, and annotated; the transcriptions are orally double-proofed; and all annotation is fact-checked.

The Digital Archive, released simultaneously with the Digital Edition, includes printed reports of speeches; routine government documents signed by Lincoln, such as military commissions; legislative documents from the Illinois General Assembly and Congress not authored by Abraham Lincoln; and other government documents (such as court-martial files) that were under Lincoln's purview but for which we cannot positively prove direct interaction.

The first online release of material included every known Lincoln document through 1842, when his career in the Illinois General Assembly ended. This amounted to 340 documents written by or to Lincoln and 4,839 documents that provide context on what issues Lincoln faced as a lawyer and legislator. The first document was a small workbook that Lincoln used as a schoolboy. Among the last was a letter in which Lincoln, who had recently broken up with Mary Todd, called himself "the most miserable man living."

== Funding agencies and endorsements ==
The Papers of Abraham Lincoln is a project of the Abraham Lincoln Presidential Library and Museum. The Center for State Policy and Leadership at the University of Illinois-Springfield was a long-time co-sponsor of the project with additional funding at various times coming from the National Endowment for the Humanities, the National Historical Publications and Records Commission, the Shelby Cullom Davis Charitable Fund and the Abraham Lincoln Presidential Library Foundation. A number of private contributors, including Iron Mountain Inc., also support the project.

The National Endowment for the Humanities designated the Papers of Abraham Lincoln as a We the People project in 2004. This designation recognizes projects that enhance the study and understanding of American history. The National Historical Publications and Records Commission, the granting agency of the National Archives, endorsed the Papers of Abraham Lincoln in May 2008. The project also received an endorsement from the Illinois Abraham Lincoln Bicentennial Commission.

== See also ==
- The Papers of George Washington
- The Papers of Thomas Jefferson
- The Papers of James Madison
- Adams Papers Editorial Project
- The Joseph Smith Papers
- Einstein Papers Project
- Papers of Martin Van Buren
