= The Papers of Thomas Jefferson =

Scholarly collection of the papers of Thomas Jefferson

- Author: Thomas Jefferson (documents), edited by Julian P. Boyd and successors
- Country: United States
- Language: English
- Genre: Historical documents
- Publisher: Princeton University Press
- Published: 1950–present
- No. of books: 40+ volumes (Chronological Series), 12+ volumes (Retirement Series)
- Website: jeffersonpapers.princeton.edu

The Papers of Thomas Jefferson is a multi-volume scholarly edition devoted to the publication of the public and private papers of Thomas Jefferson, the third President of the United States. The project, established at Princeton University, is the definitive edition of documents written by or to Jefferson. Work on the series began in 1944 and was undertaken solely at Princeton until 1998, when responsibility for editing documents from Jefferson's post-presidential retirement years, 1809 until 1826, shifted to the Thomas Jefferson Foundation at Monticello. This enabled work to progress simultaneously on two different periods of Jefferson's life and thereby doubled the production of volumes without compromising the high standards set for the project.

== History ==
The documentary editing project grew out of a plan developed in 1943 by Julian P. Boyd, the chief librarian of Princeton University, a scholar of the drafting of the Declaration of Independence, and the historian of the Thomas Jefferson Bicentennial Commission. The Commission tasked Boyd with studying whether or not a comprehensive collection of Jefferson's papers would be feasible. Prior to this less than 20% of Jefferson's papers had been published in any format and what had been published had been highly selective and thinly or poorly annotated.

Boyd, who served as the project's first general editor, intended the finished project to be complete enough to replace what had been previously published and to ensure that the task would not have to be redone in the future. Princeton University agreed to host the editorial project and Princeton University Press also agreed to publish the volumes. Initial funding came from The New York Times Company. Although the United States government, which was in the midst of World War II, could not fund the early phases of the project's work, both President Franklin D. Roosevelt and his successor Harry S. Truman were enthusiastic supporters. The project's first volume was released in 1950 to near universal praise.

As conceived by Boyd, the edition would consist of two series: one chronological and one topical. The chronological series includes letters written by and to Jefferson, as well as other documents such as memoranda, notes, and Jefferson's public addresses. The Papers of Thomas Jefferson cites itself as the "first modern historical documentary edition" and has exerted a strong influence on the presentation and organization of materials for other historical editions. Similar projects have used The Papers of Thomas Jefferson as their model.

Boyd continued to work on the Papers until his death in 1980. Boyd's immediate successor, Charles T. Cullen, introduced computer technology and the systematic indexing of the volumes. During his lifetime of working on The Papers of Thomas Jefferson, Boyd created new, higher ideals for historical editing, which his successors Cullen and Catanzariti continued after his death. Subsequent editors have been John Catanzariti, Barbara B. Oberg, and James P. McClure.

=== General editors ===
- Julian P. Boyd (Volumes 1 - 20) 1943–1980
- Charles T. Cullen (Volumes 21–23) 1980–1986
- John Catanzariti (Volumes 24–28) 1986–1998
- Barbara B. Oberg (Volumes 29–41) 1999–2014
- James P. McClure (Volumes 42 - current) 2014-

== Retirement Series ==
In 1998 Princeton University entered into a partnership with the Thomas Jefferson Foundation, Inc., which owns and operates Monticello, Jefferson's primary plantation and the place where he spent much of the remainder of his life. The Foundation assumed responsibility for Jefferson's papers composed between the end of his presidency on 4 March 1809 and his death on 4 July 1826. This new effort, named the Retirement Series, is also published by Princeton University Press in a similar format. Aided by a start-up grant from The Pew Charitable Trusts, work began in 1999 at Monticello under the editorial leadership of historian J. Jefferson Looney. The Retirement Series is expected to be completed in twenty-three annotated volumes.

=== Jefferson Quotes & Family Letters ===
In 2004 the Retirement Series launched a second project, Jefferson Quotes & Family Letters, a freely accessible collection of digital correspondence by, to, and between members of Jefferson's extensive family, excluding those to and from Jefferson himself. Ranging beyond Jefferson's life as far as the family's American Civil War experience, this material had not been part of the core Papers volumes and most of it had never been published elsewhere. These letters and other documents give personal insights into aspects of Jefferson's life that he seldom highlighted in his own writings, as well as providing accounts of the early years of the University of Virginia and of domestic, economic, and social life in nineteenth-century Virginia. Jefferson Quotes & Family Letters also features a growing collection of keyword-searchable quotes by and about Thomas Jefferson. The project is currently ongoing and new material is added regularly.

=== Retirement Series editors ===
- J. Jefferson Looney (Retirement Series Volumes 1 - current), 1999 -

== Second Series ==
The Second Series edition is a collection of Jefferson's texts that are more suitable for topical rather than chronological arrangement. This Second Series of the edition, published by Princeton University Press, consists of commissioned volumes edited by subject specialists.

Volumes published thus far are as follows:

- Jefferson's Extracts from the Gospels: The Philosophy of Jesus and The Life and Morals of Jesus (1983, edited by Dickinson W. Adams)
- Jefferson's Parliamentary Writings: Parliamentary Pocketbook and A Manual of Parliamentary Practice (1988, edited by Wilbur Samuel Howell)
- Jefferson's Literary Commonplace Book (1989, edited by Douglas L. Wilson)
- Jefferson's Memorandum Books: Accounts, with Legal Records and Miscellany, 1767-1826 (1997, 2 volumes, edited by James A. Bear Jr. & Lucia C. Stanton)

== Scope ==
The project's goal is to create as comprehensive a collection of Jefferson's personal and public papers as possible. Material collected for the project includes papers and letters written by Jefferson throughout the course of his life, both personal and professional. In order to show a complete version of events, the project also includes documents received by Jefferson. When completed, the project will have collected papers spanning from 14 January 1760 to Jefferson's death in 1826.

The published papers are drawn from original manuscripts in repositories, libraries, and private collections from around the world. Collected as photocopies or digital scans, they are then carefully transcribed, verified, annotated, and indexed in order to provide as much context and accessibility as possible.

== Design ==
The design for The Papers of Thomas Jefferson was created by Goudy Award-winning designer P. J. Conkwright of Princeton University Press, and one element of the design was a new Linotype font created for the edition. Called Monticello, the font was based on typefaces from Jefferson's era. In 2003 the English typographer Matthew Carter transformed the font into digital format.

== Publications ==
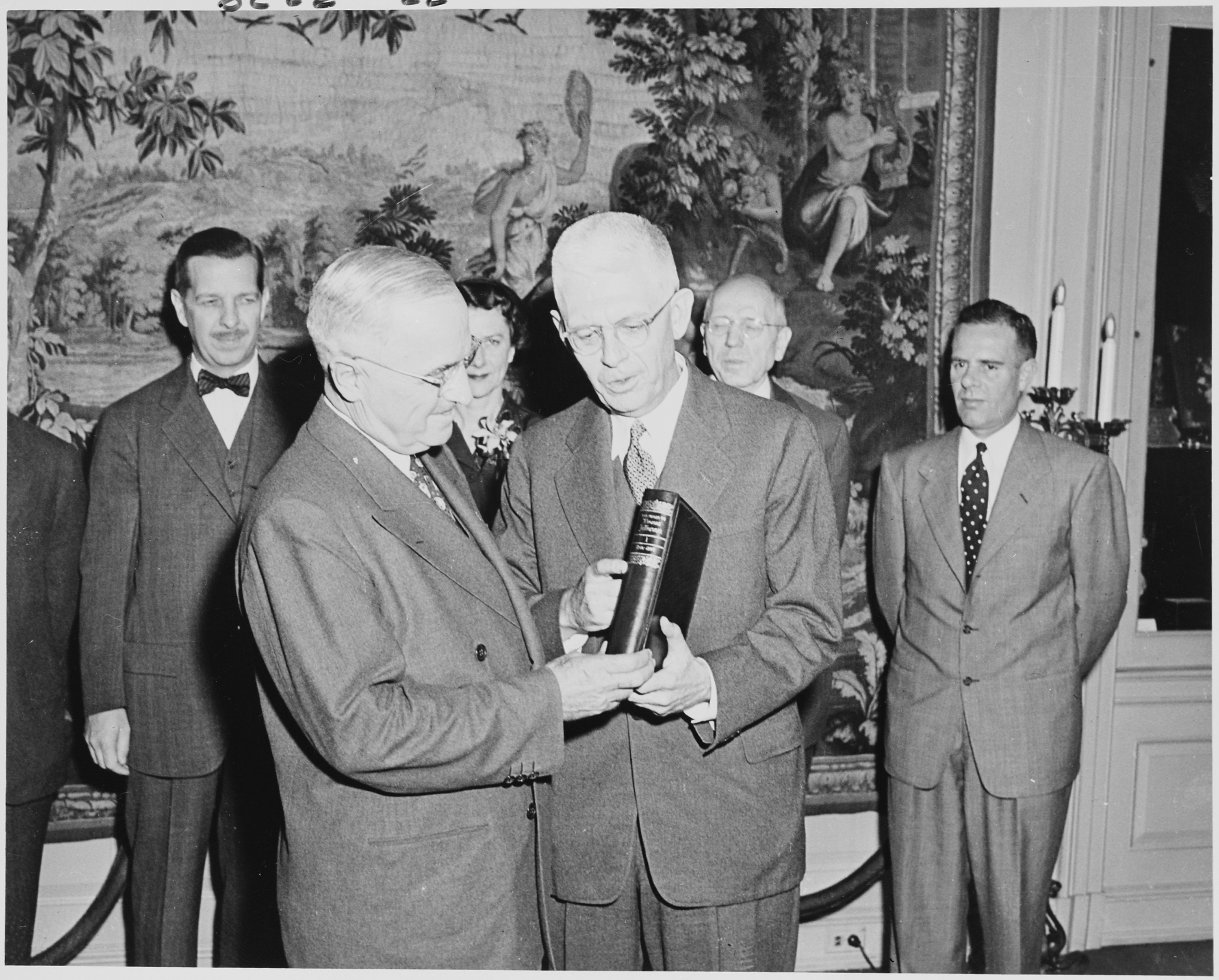
President Truman at the Library of Congress receiving the first copy of Volume One of The Papers of Thomas Jefferson.

Volumes for The Papers of Thomas Jefferson are released in print through Princeton University Press for both the pre- and post-1809 Jefferson papers. The first volume was published in 1950. As of January 2015, the Princeton editorial team has produced 41 volumes of work spanning the years between 14 January 1760 to 15 November 1803, with the first volume released in 1950. The Monticello team has completed 12 volumes as of January 2016.

=== Electronic edition ===
Beginning in April 2009, the published volumes became part of the University of Virginia Press's American Founding Era digital collection, a fully searchable subscription-based version of the volumes that are available in their entirety through its Rotunda electronic imprint. Updates and new documents are added to this edition at regular intervals and new volumes are added to Rotunda within two years of their print publication.

In June 2013, the electronic edition also became available through the open access platform Founders Online, which is sponsored by the National Archives. Jefferson's complete papers are among the 185,000 documents available to the public through the website, which also provides access to the writings and letters of six other Founding Fathers, including George Washington, John Adams, Benjamin Franklin, James Madison, John Jay, and Alexander Hamilton.

== Funding ==
The Papers of Thomas Jefferson has been cited as a successful model of private-public sponsorship by the National Archives. In addition to Princeton University and the Thomas Jefferson Foundation, Inc., the project has received support from the New York Times Company Foundation, the Packard Humanities Institute, the Florence Gould Foundation, the Pew Charitable Trusts, and other foundations and individuals. The project has been supported and able to continue and grow through the support of the many foundations and individuals. Beginning in the 1960s, the project also received federal support from the National Endowment for the Humanities and the National Historical Publications and Records Commission.

== Reception ==
Critical reception for the project and its released volumes has been positive. American historian David Chesnutt wrote that Boyd's approach to the Jefferson documents was very influential, stating "Modern historical editing dates from the publication of Julian Boyd's first volume of The Papers of Thomas Jefferson in 1950. Although there had been earlier compilations of the papers of famous Americans, his carefully prepared texts of Jefferson's letters and other writings, "warts and all," set a new standard for accuracy and reliability."

American journalist and biographer Jon Meacham also praised the Jefferson Papers, calling it "one of the most formidable and significant scholarly undertakings in American life".

=== Awards ===
- Outstanding Academic Title by the American Library Association (2005, won - for The Papers of Thomas Jefferson: Retirement Series Volume 1)

== See also ==
- The Washington Papers
- The Papers of Benjamin Franklin
- Adams Papers Editorial Project
- The Selected Papers of John Jay
- The Papers of James Madison
- Papers of Martin Van Buren
- The Papers of Abraham Lincoln
- Founders Online
