= AP European History =

Advanced Placement course and exam

Logo of AP European History as of 2025

Advanced Placement (AP) European History (also known as AP Euro), is a course and examination offered by the College Board through the Advanced Placement Program. This course is for high school students who are interested in a first year university level course in European history. The course surveys European history from between 1450 and the present, focusing on religious, social, economic, and political themes. This course allows students to understand historical references rooted in literature and culture, one example being the historical epic novel and musical Les Misérables. There has been a slight yet noticeable decline in students taking this AP course. It is considered a more difficult course, with only 13% of students earning a 5 in 2025.

== Course ==
The AP European History course covers historical events and processes across nine different units. Each unit is weighted equally on the exam, approximately 10–15%. The course units and sub-topics are as follows:

- Unit 1: Renaissance and Exploration (1450–1648)
  - Contextualizing Renaissance and Discovery
  - Italian Renaissance
  - Northern Renaissance
  - Printing
  - New Monarchies
  - Technological Advances and the Age of Exploration
  - Rivals on the World Stage
  - Colonial Expansion and the Columbian Exchange
  - The Slave Trade
  - The Commercial Revolution
  - Causation in the Renaissance and Age of Discovery
- Unit 2: Age of Reformation (1450–1648)
  - Contextualizing 16th- and 17th-Century Challenges and Developments
  - Luther and the Protestant Reformation
  - Protestant Reform Continues
  - Wars of Religion
  - The Catholic Reformation
  - 16th-Century Society and Politics
  - Art of the 16th Century: Mannerism and Baroque Art
  - Causation in the Age of Reformation and the Wars of Religion
- Unit 3: Absolutism and Constitutionalism (1648–1815)
  - Contextualizing State Building
  - The English Civil War and the Glorious Revolution
  - Continuities and Changes to Economic Practice and Development
  - Economic Development and Mercantilism
  - The Dutch Golden Age
  - Balance of Power
  - Absolutist Approaches to Power
  - Comparison in the Age of Absolutism and Constitutionalism
- Unit 4: Scientific, Philosophical, and Political Developments (1648–1815)
  - Contextualizing the Scientific Revolution and the Enlightenment
  - The Scientific Revolution
  - The Age of Enlightenment
  - 18th-Century Society and Demographics
  - 18th-Century Culture and Arts
  - Enlightened and Other Approaches to Power
  - Causation in the Age of the Scientific Revolution and the Enlightenment
- Unit 5: Conflict, Crisis, and Reaction in the Late 18th Century (1648–1815)
  - Contextualizing 18th-Century States
  - The Rise of Global Markets
  - Britain's Ascendency
  - The French Revolution
  - The French Revolution's Effects
  - Napoleon's Rise, Dominance, and Defeat
  - The Congress of Vienna
  - Romanticism
  - Continuity and Change in 18th-Century States
- Unit 6: Industrialization and Its Effects (1815–1914)
  - Contextualizing Industrialization and Its Origins and Effects
  - The Spread of Industry Throughout Europe
  - Second Wave Industrialization and Its Effects
  - Social Effects of Industrialization
  - The Concert of Europe and European Conservatism
  - Reactions and Revolutions
  - Ideologies of Change and Reform Movements
  - 19th-Century Social Reform
  - Institutional Responses and Reform
  - Causation in the Age of Industrialization
- Unit 7: 19th-Century Perspective and Political Developments (1815–1914)
  - Contextualizing 19th-Century Perspectives and Political Developments
  - Nationalism
  - National Unification and Diplomatic Treaties
  - Darwinism, Social Darwinism
  - The Age of Progress and Modernity
  - New Imperialism: Motivations and Methods
  - Imperialism's Global Effects
  - 19th-Century Culture and Arts
  - Causation in 19th-Century Perspectives and Political Development
- Unit 8: 20th-Century Global Conflicts (1914–present)
  - Contextualizing 20th-Century Global Conflicts
  - World War I
  - The Russian Revolution and Its Effects
  - Versailles Conference and Peace Settlement
  - Global Economic Crisis
  - Fascism and Totalitarianism
  - Europe During the Interwar Period
  - World War II
  - The Holocaust
  - 20th-Century Cultural, Intellectual, and Artistic Developments
  - Continuity and Changes in an Age of Global Conflict
- Unit 9: Cold War and Contemporary Europe
  - Contextualizing Cold War and Contemporary Europe (1914–present)
  - Rebuilding Europe
  - The Cold War
  - Two Super Powers Emerge
  - Postwar Nationalism, Ethnic Conflict, and Atrocities
  - Contemporary Western Democracies
  - The Fall of Communism
  - 20th-Century Feminism
  - Decolonization
  - The European Union
  - Migration and Immigration
  - Technology
  - Globalization
  - 20th- and 21st-Century Culture, Arts, and Demographic Trends
  - Continuity and Change in the 20th and 21st Centuries

== Exam ==
The AP exam for European History is divided into two sections, comprising 55 multiple-choice questions (with four answer choices), three short-answer questions, and two essay responses (one thematic Long Essay Question (LEQ) and one Document Based Question (DBQ)). The multiple-choice and short-answer sections are to be completed in 55 minutes and 40 minutes respectively. The essay section is to be completed in 100 minutes (including the 15-minute reading period). The DBQ is graded out of 7 points and the LEQ is graded out of 6 points. This new structure went into effect beginning Fall 2017. The DBQ is weighted at 25 percent while the FRQ/LEQ is weighted at 15 percent. The Short Answer is weighted 20 percent, with the multiple-choice accounting for the final 40 percent.

Approximately half of the multiple-choice questions cover the period from 1450 to the French Revolution and Napoleonic era, and half cover the period from the French Revolution and Napoleonic era to the present, evenly divided between the nineteenth and twentieth centuries. About one-third of the questions focus on cultural and intellectual themes, one-third on political and diplomatic themes, and one-third on social and economic themes. Many questions draw on knowledge of more than one chronological period or theme. Although this is the general trend based on past AP Exams, it is not mandated that the exam follow this format. In recent years and present, the multiple choice portion is Stimulus Based, meaning the students are given an excerpt of a speech or writing, photograph, or painting, to analyze and answer questions and/or give presentations on the given info.

Test Part	Test Section	Time Allotted	Questions	Weight
Part A	Multiple Choice	55 minutes	55 questions	40%
Part A	Short Answer Questions (SAQ)	40 minutes	3 questions	20%
Part B	Document Based Question (DBQ)	60 minutes (including 15-minute reading period)	1 question	25%
Part B	Long Essay Question (LEQ)	40 minutes	1 question	15%

=== Free Response sections ===
The Free Response sections of the test offer some choice.

- Short Answer Question (SAQ): (complete 3 of 4)
  - Two questions spanning 1600–2001 (both mandatory)
  - Choice between questions Q3 (periods 1 and 2) and Q4 (periods 3 and 4)
- Long Essay Question (LEQ): (complete 1 of 3)
  - Choice between questions Q1 (period 1), Q2 (periods 2 and 3) and Q3 (periods 3 and 4)

=== Grade distributions ===
The grade distributions as of 2026 are as follows:

Final Score	2007	2008	2009	2010	2011	2012	2013	2014	2015	2016	2017	2018	2019	2020	2021	2022	2023	2024	2025	2026
5	11.1%	9.2%	13.9%	12.7%	10.6%	10.5%	10.4%	8.6%	10.3%	7.4%	9.3%	11.9%	11.7%	13.7%	10.6%	13.5%	12.9%	13.1%	13%	16%
4	18.9%	17.2%	19.2%	18.4%	18.7%	19.2%	18.8%	16.9%	17.3%	16.0%	18.6%	19.9%	20.5%	20.1%	19.4%	21.0%	21.3%	33.3%	35%	33%
3	35.9%	34.9%	33.9%	34.5%	35.5%	36.0%	34.8%	34.0%	35.6%	29.2%	28.0%	25.9%	25.9%	25.5%	24.7%	24.4%	25.2%	25.2%	24%	35%
2	11.2%	12.1%	11.3%	11.2%	11.6%	10.8%	11.0%	11.8%	10.7%	35.1%	31.9%	30.0%	29.4%	29.2%	32.5%	29.7%	29.0%	20.7%	19%	18%
1	22.9%	26.6%	21.7%	23.2%	23.6%	23.5%	25.0%	28.7%	26.2%	12.3%	12.1%	12.2%	12.5%	11.5%	12.9%	11.4%	11.6%	7.7%	9%	8%
% of Scores 3 or Higher	65.9%	61.3%	67.0%	65.6%	64.9%	65.8%	63.9%	59.5%	63.2%	52.6%	56.0%	57.7%	58.1%	59.3%	54.6%	58.9%	59.4%	71.6%	72%	74%
Mean Score	2.84	2.70	2.92	2.86	2.81	2.83	2.78	2.65	2.75	2.71	2.81	2.89	2.90	2.95	2.82	2.95	2.95	3.23		
Standard Deviation	1.28	1.28	1.31	1.31	1.28	1.28	1.29	1.29	1.29	1.10	1.15	1.21	1.21	1.22	1.19	1.23	1.22	1.13		
Number of Students	97,042	100,648	101,359	102,629	107,392	108,854	109,878	110,297	107,267	109,031	105,347	101,740	100,655	94,312	84,237	80,152	81,788	83,266	86,729	91,000
