= Founders Online =

Research website

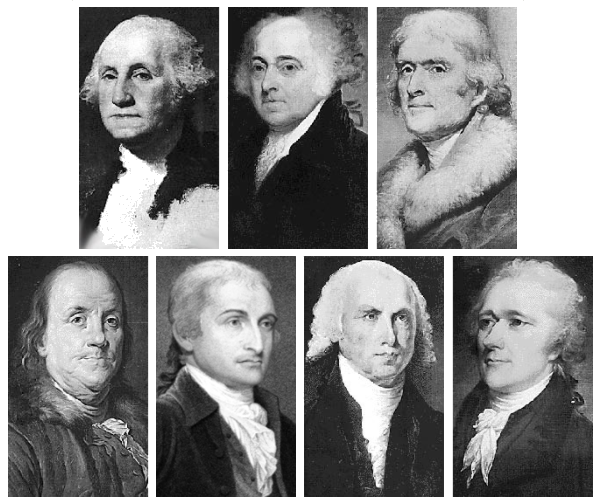
- George Washington, John Adams, Thomas Jefferson, Benjamin Franklin, John Jay, James Madison, and Alexander Hamilton
- Headquarters: University of Virginia, Charlottesville, Virginia, United States
- Owners: National Historical Publications and Records Commission; The University of Virginia Press
- Products: Papers and correspondence 185,000 documents
- Services: Searchable database Free to the public
- Website: founders.archives.gov

Founders Online is a research website providing free access to a digitized collection representing the collected papers of seven of the most influential figures in the founding of the United States. Among the 185,000 documents available through the website's searchable database are the papers of John Adams, Benjamin Franklin, Alexander Hamilton, John Jay, Thomas Jefferson, James Madison, and George Washington. The database also includes correspondence between these Founders and hundreds of other figures. The website is a cooperative venture between the National Historical Publications and Records Commission (NHPRC), the grant-making arm of the National Archives, and The University of Virginia Press.

== Collected papers of Founding Fathers ==
The Founders Online website, launched on June 13, 2013, enables students, researchers, scholars, and the general public to read what the Founders wrote and debated in the years leading up to and following the nation's formation. The subjects they discussed between themselves and others ranged from public policies and democratic principles to slavery and the Constitution. The works available also provide insight into the Founders' friendships and personal lives.

The website's collection is the result of a 50-year effort by scholars to locate, transcribe, annotate, and digitize 18th and 19th century documents held by archives worldwide. From these works, hundreds of individual volumes have been published that can also be accessed.

The collection is derived from the letterpress editions of the Founders' original papers, which were drawn from the following sources:

- John Adams ― Massachusetts Historical Society and Harvard University Press
- Benjamin Franklin ― Yale University Press
- Alexander Hamilton ― Columbia University Press
- Thomas Jefferson ― Princeton University Press
- John Jay, James Madison, and George Washington ― University of Virginia Press

Besides the complete works of these individuals, Founders Online includes the selected papers of John Jay, first Chief Justice of the U.S. Supreme Court. Eventually, the website's collection is expected to exceed 200,000 documents. The website is based at the University of Virginia in Charlottesville.

== Funding ==
The website's editorial work is made possible through federal funding from the National Historical Publications and Records Commission and the National Endowment for the Humanities. Additional major funding is provided by a wide range of foundations, corporations, and private individuals. Also sponsoring Founders Online's editorial projects are The University of Virginia, Princeton University, Massachusetts Historical Society, Columbia University. Yale University, American Philosophical Society, University of Chicago, and Thomas Jefferson Foundation at Monticello.

== See also ==
- Adams Papers Editorial Project
- Bibliography of the United States Constitution
- Founding Fathers of the United States
- The Papers of Benjamin Franklin
- The Papers of James Madison
- The Papers of Thomas Jefferson
- The Selected Papers of John Jay
- The Washington Papers
- University of Virginia Press
