= Charles B. Norton =

American publisher (1825–1891)

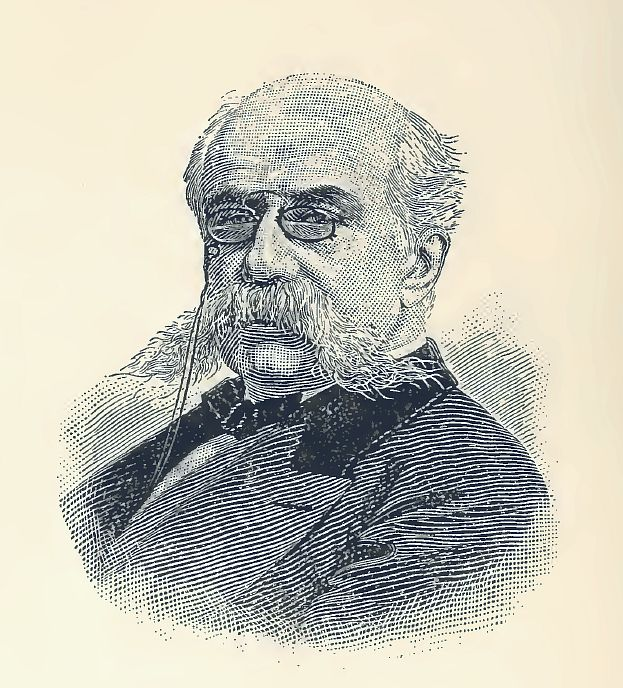
Charles Benjamin Norton

Charles Benjamin Norton (July 1, 1825 – 1891) was an American archivist, early American historian and publisher of books, a dealer in rare books and one of the few individuals in his day that made arduous efforts to preserve early American history in the form of published manuscripts, books, diaries, letters, etc. He founded Norton's Literary Letter, a numismatic journal, in 1857. Norton also served as a Lieutenant-Colonel on the staff of General Fitz John Porter during the American Civil War. After the war, he kept abreast of the post-war American inventions and developments of ordnance and munitions and authored and edited several books outlining this advent.

== Early life ==
Norton was born in Hartford, Connecticut, on July 1, 1825. He lived much of his early life in Boston, where he became well known by the literary community. He was the son of the late Major Benjamin Hammatt Norton who was the consul at Pictou under President Zachary Taylor.

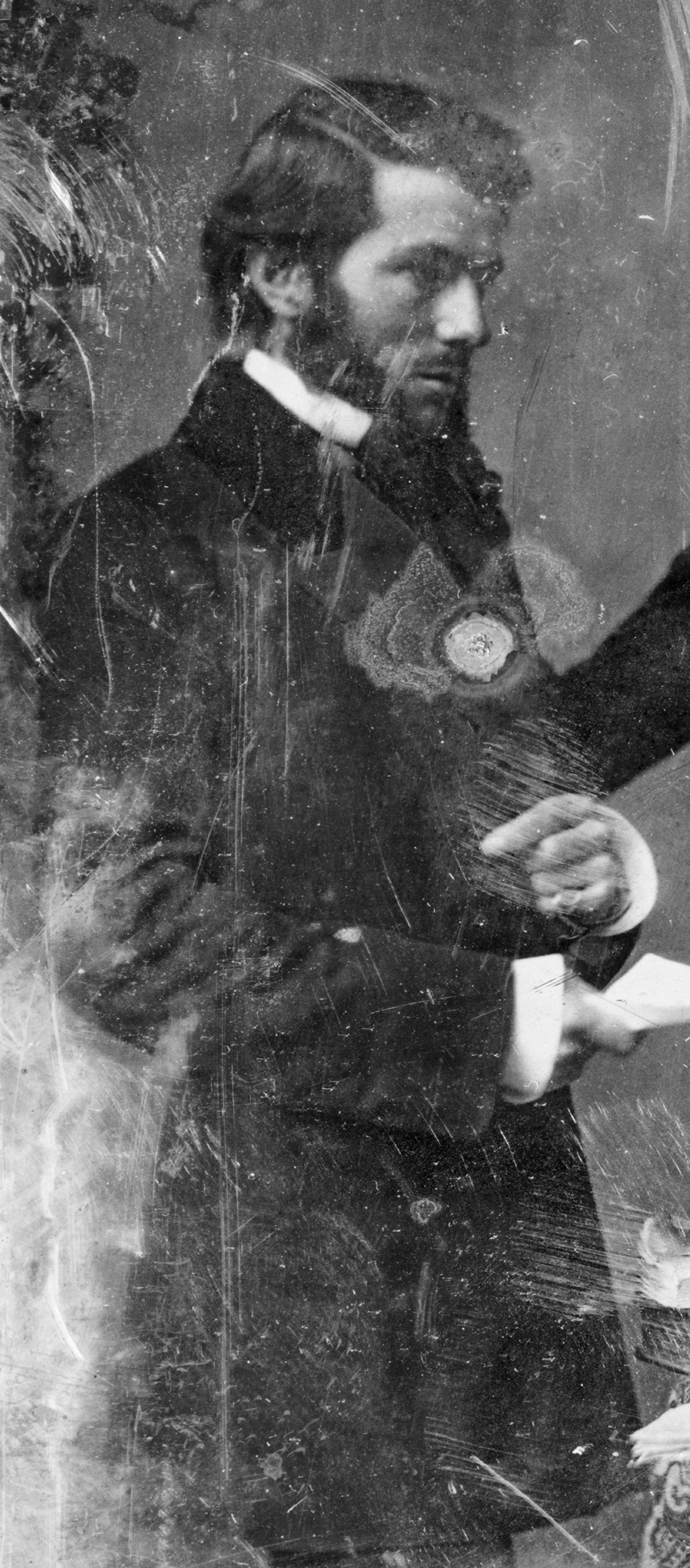
Charles B. Norton in his younger years (Note: Daguerreotype by Civil War photographer Mathew Brady)

== Career ==
Norton as a collector of coins is famous to American numismatists as he founded and published Norton's Literary Letter beginning in October 1857. The publication included numismatic information and inspired interests among New York and New England numismatists for a numismatic publication of their own resulting in the American Journal of Numismatics. In April 1855 he sold his stock of books at John Keese Auction House, New York.

Before 1861 Norton was a dealer in rare books in New York City, and made occasional trips to Europe, buying books from distinguished libraries, and donating or reselling them for public and private use. In 1861 he donated a number of books to the library at Harvard University.

Norton was mostly known for his Literary Gazette, (Note: Not to be confused with The Literary Gazette of London.) the country's first library periodical. In the Literary Gazette is where the first library convention was held, in September 1853, in New York City, the predecessor to the American Library Association. Beginning in 1857, Norton authored and published a series of historically informative catalogs called Norton's Literary Letter, featuring "Rare and Valuable Works relative to America". i.e. rare books, letters, coins and medals. The publication featured a number of historically related essays. Norton, Grant and Coit Gilman, from Yale university, were the publication's editors.

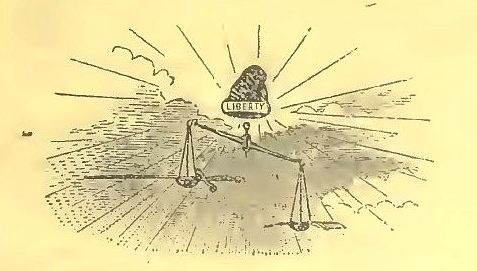
Norton's personal emblem, from his Literary Letter, symbolizing The Pen is mightier than the Sword.

Norton also arranged the reunion of 1853 attendees at the 1887 American Library Association at the Thousand Islands.

Norton's stationery and his Literary Letter title page emblem depicts a balance, on which there is a sword on one side, and a quill feather pen on the other, with the quill pen weighing heavier than the sword.

== Civil War ==
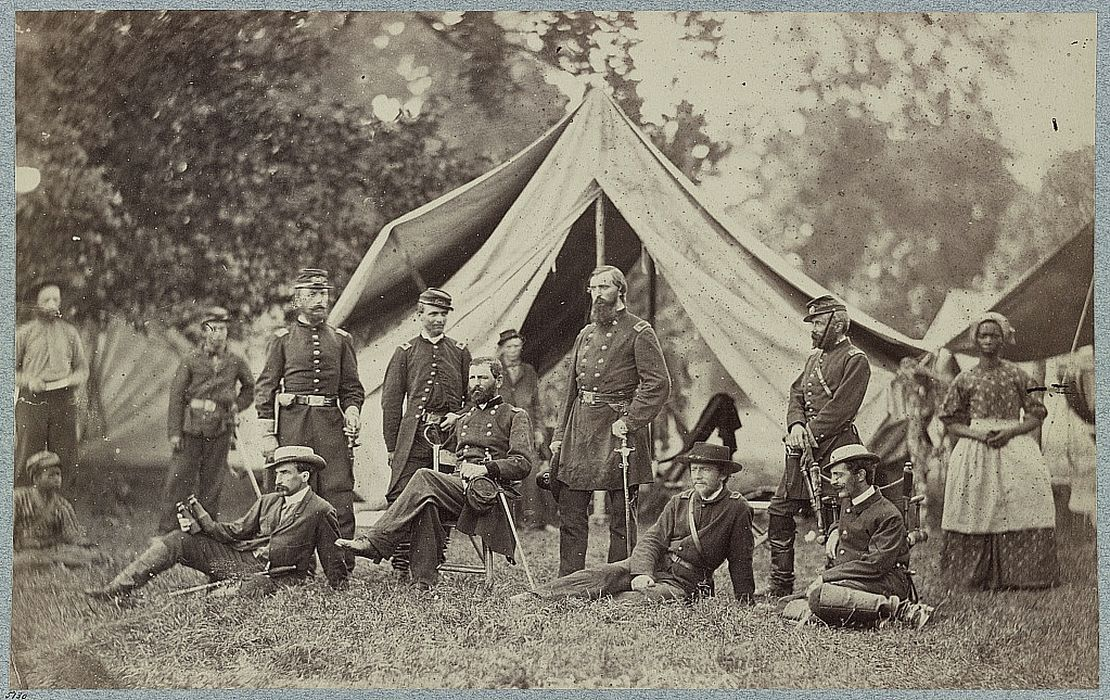
General Porter's staff, August 1862 Colonel Norton is standing on the right. (Note: According to the date inscribed on the photo, August 14–15, it was taken just a couple of weeks before the Second Battle of Bull Run, August 28–30, 1862.) See also:Norton on horseback, Maryland

During the American Civil War Norton served with distinction in the Union Army as a quartermaster in a New York Regiment, then as a lieutenant colonel in the 5th Army Corps, Army of the Potomac, on the staff of General Fitz John Porter, headquartered at Harrison's Landing on the James River in Virginia. and was present at the Second Battle of Bull Run in Virginia, and at the Battle of Antietam in Maryland in 1862. He was brevetted brigadier-general in 1863, after which he resigned his commission on January 6 of that year.

During the Northern Virginia Campaign, as General Lee and his troops were getting closer to Washington D.C., Norton offered to hide and store the vast archival library of Peter Force, housed in that city, from potential Confederate invaders; however, Force did not want to vacate Washington with his library and declined Norton's offer.

=== Post war ===
Shortly after the war, in 1867 during the ongoing series of Expositions in Paris, Norton and his associate William J. Valentine traveled to Paris to examine the exhibit of the latest U.S. military ordnance and munitions on display there. Norton had criticized the U.S. government for not sending their own engineers and military officers to the exposition to examine and investigate all the new weapons and munitions developed during and after the Civil War, and for remaining largely ignorant of these developments and the engineers responsible. To this end Norton, a Brevet Brigadier General, acting as U.S. Commissioner, and Valentine set, out to conduct their own investigation and in 1868 published their findings in a 286-page report, i.e. Report to the Government of the United States on the Munitions of War Exhibited at the Paris Universal Exhibition, which contains many schematic illustrations and outlines of breech-loading rifles and other weapons. The report was presented to the Secretary of State, William H. Seward. Along with an outline of the various new weapons they examined, (Note: In particular, the Robert's Breech-Loading rifle, the Broughton gun, the Gatling battery) the report expressed their desire that it be read by Congress and that ultimately it would be published by the War Department. The information accumulated led to Norton's publication of 1880 outlining American inventions involving breech-loading small arms, heavy ordnance, and other arms.

== Final days ==
Norton was appointed and served as United-States Commissioner to the Paris Exposition in 1867. Norton died in Chicago in 1891 while helping to plan the Columbian Exposition.

== Selected works ==
Norton authored many books covering a wide range of nationally oriented subjects, concerning government, history, conventions and military related topics. Some of his more notable works include:

- Catalogue of a bibliographical library, 1855
- Norton's literary gazette and publishers' circular, 1855
- American inventions and improvements in breech-loading small arms, heavy ordnance, machine guns, magazine arms, fixed ammunition ... 1880
- Report to the Government of the United States on the Munitions of War Exhibited at the Paris Universal Exhibition, 1867
- Norton's Literary Letter: Comprising American Papers of Interest Upon Numismatics and Medals, 1862
- Official Catalogue Foreign Exhibition, Boston, 1883
- The American Exhibition of the Arts, Inventions, Manufacturers, 1885
- The President And His Cabinet: Indicating The Progress Of The Government Of The United States Under The Administration Of Grover Cleveland, 1888

== See also ==
- Peter Force, 19th century archivist
- American Numismatic Society
- John Clement Fitzpatrick - historian and archivist of the Papers of George Washington
- Howard Henry Peckham – prominent early American archivist
- Antiquarian
- Antiquarian Booksellers' Association of America
- List of American Civil War brevet generals (Union)
- James Kendall Hosmer, writer, historian and librarian

== Bibliography ==
- Boatner, Mark M. III (1988). The Civil War Dictionary (Revised ed.). New York: David McKay. ISBN 978-0-8129-1726-0.
- "Peter Force papers (1774-1868, bulk 1820-1867)". William L. Clements Library, University of Michigan. 2014.
- Hennessy, John J. (1999). Return to Bull Run: The Campaign and Battle of Second Manassas. University of Oklahoma Press. ISBN 978-0-8061-3187-0.
- Norton, Charles B.; Valentine, William J. (1868). Report to the Government of the United States on the Munitions of War Exhibited at the Paris Universal Exhibition, 1867. Office of Army and Naval Journal.
- —— (1880). American inventions and improvements in breech-loading small arms, heavy ordnance, machine guns, magazine arms, fixed ammunition, pistols, projectiles. Springfield, Mass. : Chapin & Gould.
- —— (1859). Norton's Literary Letter [no. 3]. Eric P. Newman Numismatic Education Society.
- —— (1859). Norton's Literary Letter [no. 1]. Eric P. Newman Numismatic Education Society.
- "Norton, Charles B. (1825-1891)". The American Library Association Archives, University of Illinois. 1978.
- Lupia, III, John N. (2011). "Charles Benjamin Norton (1825-1891)". Encyclopedic Dictionary of Numismatic Biographies.
- "Charles Benjamin Norton, publisher and bookseller ..." Library of Congress. 1992.
- Norton, Charles Benjamin, ed. (1883). Official Catalogue Foreign Exhibition, Boston, 1883. G. Coolidge. See Google listing also
- John Mark Ockerbloom, ed. (2006). "Norton, Charles B. (Charles Benjamin), 1825-1891". The Online Books Page, University of Pennsylvania.
- "General Fitz John Porter and Staff, 1862". Encyclopedia Virginia, Virginia Humanities / Library of Virginia.
- Harvard University. Board of Overseers (1860). Report of the Committee of the Overseers of Harvard College. George C. Rand & Avery.
- "General Fitz John Porter and Staff, 1862". Encyclopedia Virginia, Library of Virginia.
