= The Papers of James Madison =

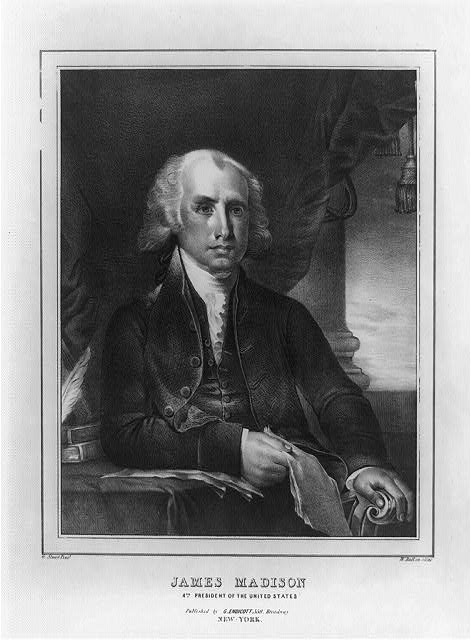
James Madison, the fourth President of the United States

The Papers of James Madison project was established in 1956 to collect and publish in a comprehensive letterpress edition the correspondence and other writings of James Madison, the fourth president of the United States.

The volumes provide accurate texts of Madison's incoming and outgoing correspondence, newspaper essays, speeches, and pamphlets. The texts are accompanied by informative annotation and made accessible through comprehensive indexes. They are valuable research tools for students of Madison's life and those interested in the general history of the period in which Madison lived (1751–1836).

== Editors in chief ==
- William T. Hutchinson and William M. E. Rachal (1956–1971)
- Robert A. Rutland (1971–1986)
- John C. A. Stagg (1987–present)

== James Madison's papers ==
Unlike the large volume of personal documents surviving his compatriots George Washington and Thomas Jefferson, comparatively few papers exist to chronicle James Madison's personal life. Madison appears to have destroyed many of his own letters and plantation records, which he did not feel were of historical importance. Those that survived were mostly scattered among friends, family, and autograph collectors.

However, Madison did retain, collect, and organize many of his public papers, particularly during his retirement when he presumably had more time to attend to the task. Recognizing the historical importance of these documents, he arranged and edited them "with a view to their appearance in print after his death." He chose for this publication "his notes on the debates of the 1780s and many of his letters and other papers bearing upon public affairs during that decade," including his notes on the proceedings of the Federal Convention of 1787. Madison expected the posthumous publication of his papers to both benefit history and to provide for his wife, Dolley Payne Todd Madison.

In 1837, a year after Madison's death, Dolley sold to Congress his notes from the Constitutional Convention of 1787, as well as those he had taken on the debates "in the Congress of the Confederations in 1782, '83, & '87." These were published in 1840 in Henry Gilpin's three-volume edition The Papers of James Madison, Purchased by Order of Congress; Being His Correspondence and Reports of Debates during the Congress of the Confederation and His Reports of Debates in the Federal Convention [. . .] .

When Dolley ultimately sold the remainder of Madison's papers to Congress in 1848, she apparently did not realize that her son, John Payne Todd, had retained for himself many of the more valuable manuscripts from that collection. These he sold periodically to various creditors until his death in 1851, gaining funds to pay his gambling and liquor debts.

Over the years, collections of Madison's papers have repeatedly sold at auction, and even today some still circulate in this manner. By these means, Madison's papers became widely scattered over time. A fuller detailed history of the papers is provided in the introduction to the first PJM Congressional Series volume.

== Project history ==
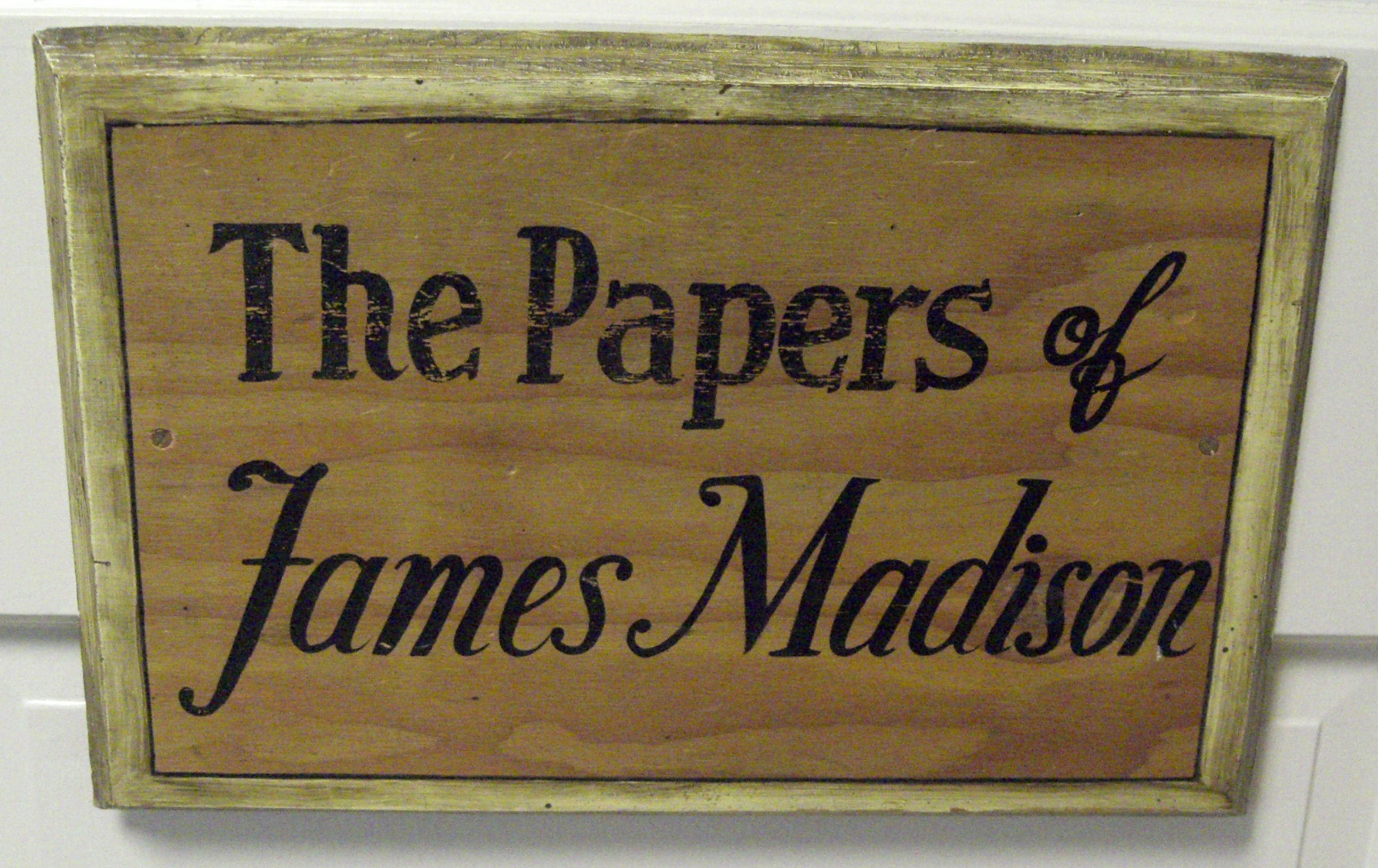
The Papers of James Madison, at the University of Virginia

Although three collections of Madison's papers had been published before 1956, the earlier editions were not complete and were also not entirely accurate. A new edition, The Papers of James Madison (PJM), was therefore conceived in 1956 to provide a definitive, comprehensive, and accurate representation of Madison's life.

The PJM document editors determined that it was critical to include both incoming and outgoing correspondence in the new edition of Madison's papers. Previous editions had only published selections from Madison's outgoing correspondence. With the omission of incoming correspondence, readers were deprived of the background necessary to understand Madison's own writings. Incoming letters can provide clues to the existence of other as-yet-undiscovered Madison correspondence and papers, and also reflect the wide range of concerns Madison dealt with in his public and private life.

Earlier editions also omitted many of Madison's writings because they were illegible, inaccessible, and/or written in code. The PJM project provides a better understanding of all of Madison's writings by methodically collecting, transcribing, and interpreting even the most difficult of his papers. Additionally, the PJM project publishes some important third-party materials that are known to have passed through Madison's hands and that demonstrably informed his conduct in significant ways.

As of 2011, the project has collected nearly 29,000 copies of documents relating to Madison's life, including letters, essays, notes, diaries, account books, ledgers, wills, legal papers, and inventories. Since 1962, thirty-three PJM volumes have been published. Initially a joint venture between the University of Chicago and the University of Virginia, the PJM project was located in Chicago, Illinois, until 1971, at which time it moved to Charlottesville, Virginia. The first ten PJM volumes were published by the University of Chicago Press between 1962 and 1977. Since 1977, all volumes have been produced by the University of Virginia Press.

=== Digital editions ===
In early 2010, the PJM project went digital when the first seventeen PJM volumes were made available to readers online. As of 2011, all published PJM volumes are a part of the American Founding Era collection published by ROTUNDA, the digital publishing branch of the University of Virginia Press. Readers can now access the published volumes online via libraries and other institutions that subscribe to ROTUNDA.

In October 2010, the National Archives and Records Administration and University of Virginia Press announced their intention to create Founders Online, a website devoted to the papers of the Founding Fathers, encompassing the papers of Madison as well as six other founders. The website went online in October 2013, providing free access to the complete record of all of Madison's political writings, his public actions and speeches, and his public and private correspondence. The Founders Online project also includes the annotated writings and correspondence of John Adams, Benjamin Franklin, Alexander Hamilton, John Jay, Thomas Jefferson, and George Washington. The site's searchable database will eventually include around 200,000 individual documents that have been drawn from the letterpress editions of the founders' papers.

== Publications ==
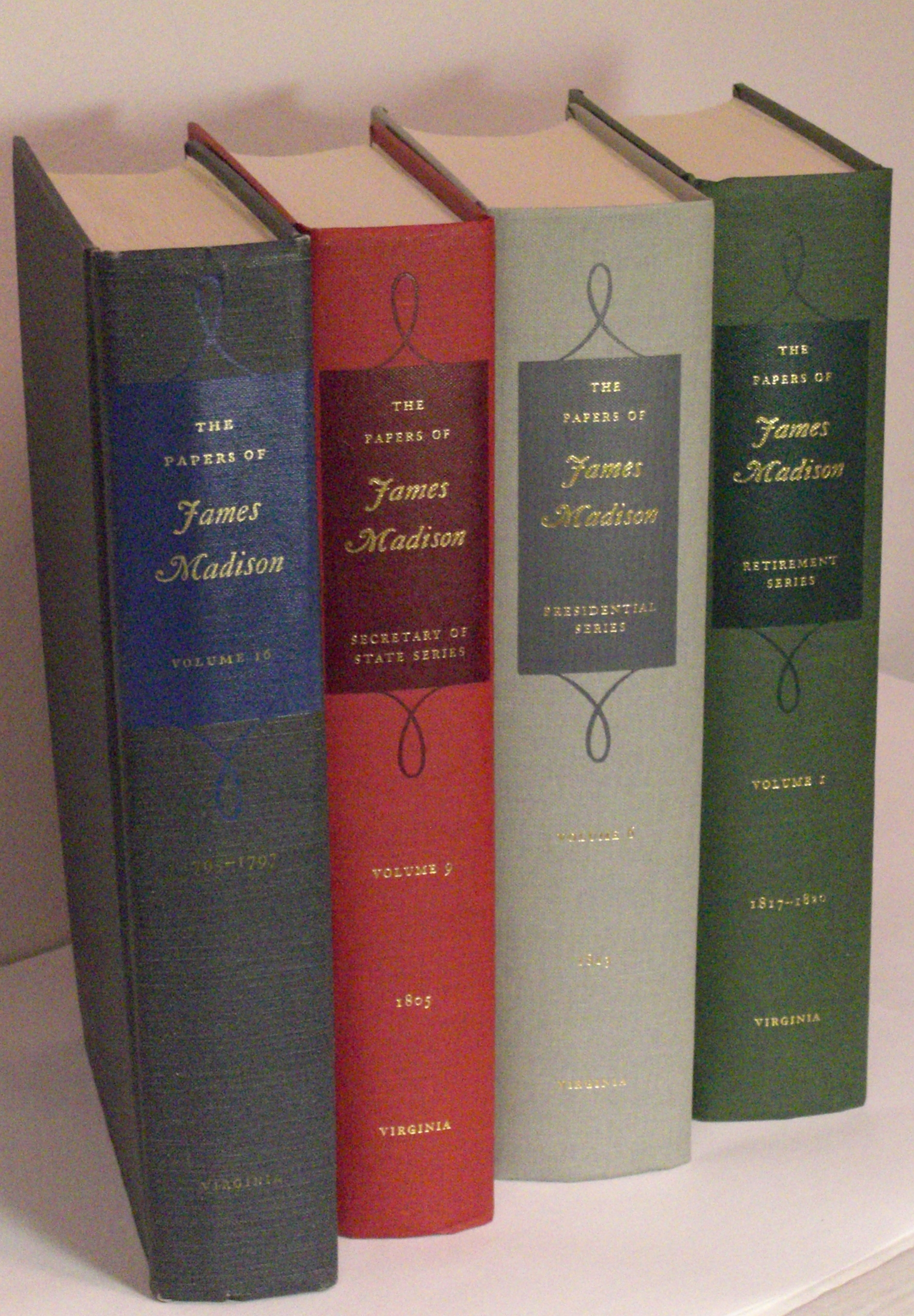
The Papers of James Madison volumes: four series

The Papers of James Madison project publishes Madison's correspondence in four series. The projected 53-volume collection is anticipated to be complete by 2030.

- The Congressional Series covers the years 1751 to 1801, recording Madison's contributions to the creation of the American republic. This series includes correspondence regarding his service in the Continental Congress, the Virginia General Assembly, the Constitutional Convention of 1787, the Virginia Ratifying Convention of 1788, and the first four Federal Congresses. There are seventeen Congressional volumes and this series is complete.
- The Secretary of State Series documents Madison's diplomatic and political career during the two presidential terms of Thomas Jefferson, 1801–9. As U.S. Secretary of State, Madison oversaw negotiations for the Louisiana Purchase and the integration of those territories into the United States. He was also responsible for the U.S. Patent Office, issued all federal commissions, oversaw the printing of the public laws, and served as official liaison between the president and the governors of the U.S. states and territories. This series contains a wealth of international correspondence between Madison and five ministers, a dozen commissioners, and more than fifty consuls worldwide. There are twelve Secretary of State volumes published to date, of a projected seventeen.
- The Presidential Series covers early 1809 to early 1817, centering largely on Madison's record as commander-in-chief during the War of 1812, the first full-scale conflict to be waged under the Federal Constitution of 1787. As president, Madison corresponded on national politics, international diplomacy and war, Indian affairs, and the development of the nation's capital, while also responding to ordinary citizens who sent petitions for charity and mercy. There are eleven Presidential volumes and this series is complete.
- The Retirement Series records Madison's life after leaving public office in 1817 until his death in 1836. Correspondence illuminates his occupations at his Montpelier home in Orange County, Virginia, and documents his significant role in the founding of the University of Virginia. This series also contains many of Madison's own reflections on the past history and future prospects of the United States. There are four Retirement volumes published to date, of a projected seven.

== Collecting the papers ==
In 1956, the PJM editors began to inventory and collect the writings of James Madison. The project does not hold any original documents. Instead, the editors work with copies provided by repositories and private owners worldwide. These may be photocopies or reproductions on microfilm, fiche, or card, electronic scans or print copies from journals and newspapers of the period. A file is created for each document, including supporting notes and correspondence to assist in annotation.

When copies are not sufficient for accurate transcription, PJM staff may travel to the repositories to view the originals of Madison's papers. Many originals are held by the Library of Congress and the National Archives of the United States. The Library of Congress makes digital images of their collection available free for online public viewing via American Memory. This resource allows interested scholars to become familiar with the evolution of Madison's style over his lifetime, and also gives them the opportunity to see the varieties of penmanship and languages Madison had to decipher. Interpreting some of these more complex documents, particularly those from non-native English speakers and from correspondents with limited formal education, is one of the more interesting challenges the PJM staff deals with on a regular basis.

Madison's papers are also held by private and public libraries as well as in museum and historical society collections worldwide. Conveniently for the PJM staff, the University of Virginia Albert and Shirley Small Special Collections Library holds a large collection of original Madison documents. As a founding member of the university's Board of Visitors, and its second rector after Jefferson's death in 1826, Madison corresponded on a multitude of topics related to the early years of the university. Small Library holds not only these official documents, but also a significant number of Madison papers donated over the years in acknowledgement of the key place Madison holds in the university's history.

James Madison signature

Still other Madison documents are owned by private individuals, many bought and sold by autograph collectors, and others passed down through generations of families, including Madison's own. These individuals, as well as institutional holders of Madison documents, are acknowledged in the PJM volumes for providing permission to publish annotated, print editions of their letters.

Every so often previously undiscovered Madison documents are located. PJM staff find them in print and online auction catalogs, and occasionally receive a phone call, email, or letter about a newly unearthed document in a repository or private hands. The project is always grateful to add another Madison document to its collection.

== The editing process ==
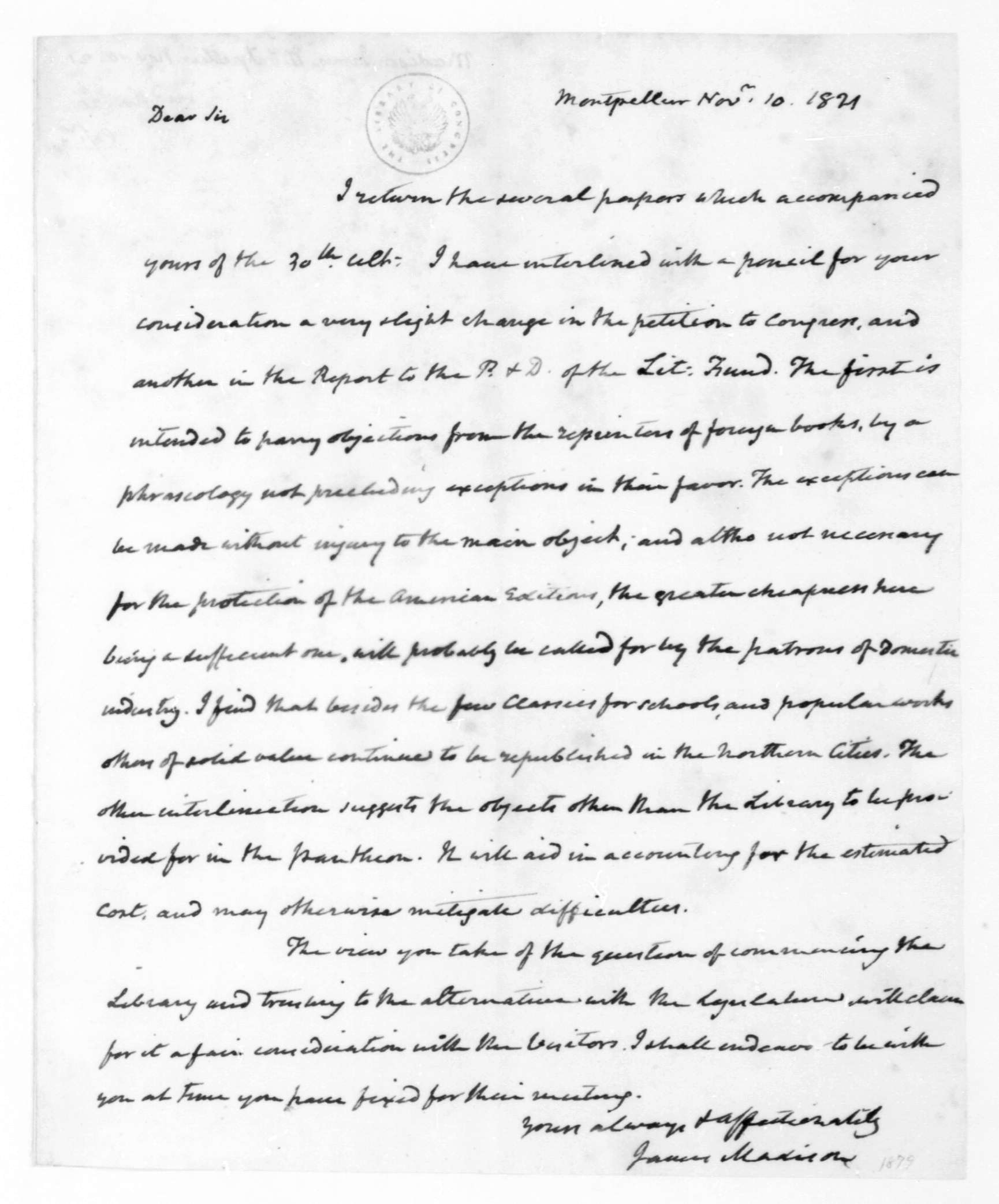
James Madison to Thomas Jefferson, 10 November 1821

The process of editing the Papers of James Madison is complex. The first step is to verify authenticity of the documents. The PJM editors then decide how to represent each document. While some bureaucratic and routine correspondence may be omitted or mentioned in footnotes, the majority of Madison's papers are printed or abstracted in full, to illuminate his thinking and his public and personal life.

After transcribing and proofreading each letter to ensure document accuracy, PJM staff members research and annotate the letters, identifying people, places, and events so readers have much the same information Madison had when he received or wrote the correspondence. Considerable effort is made to render the printed texts as literal, faithful copies of the original manuscripts. Misspellings, not uncommon at the time, are retained so readers can see what Madison saw.

=== Special case documents ===
Some documents are more complicated than others. For example, those that are badly defaced, torn, undated, misdated, or unsigned require additional research in order to accurately present them to readers. Those that are written in code pose particular problems. To learn more about the extensive process of preparing Madison's letters for publication, and the special case of coded documents, click here.

=== Sample documents ===
You can see more examples of documents in Madison's own hand by clicking here.

== The future of the project ==
The PJM staff will continue to produce print editions of the Papers of James Madison until all series are complete. In addition, PJM staff will continue to consult as needed on a project that provides web access to Madison's as-yet-unpublished papers that are not already available through ROTUNDA's Founders Early Access.

This endeavor, Founders Online, is a partnership begun in September 2011 between the U.S. National Archives and the Virginia Humanities, formerly the Virginia Foundation for the Humanities, a U.Va. affiliate. Founders Online makes available online Madison's unpublished secretary of state and presidential papers, along with unpublished correspondence from other Founding Fathers of the United States—John Adams, Benjamin Franklin, Thomas Jefferson, and George Washington.

Free access to these documents is available on a website administered by the National Archives. The project is managed by Documents Compass, a non-profit program of the Virginia Humanities whose focus is to bring documentary editions into the digital age. Founders Online gives scholars and the general public access to these primary source materials before they appear in the official print editions.

== Project funding ==
The Papers of James Madison, a non-profit project, is funded in part by contributions from private individuals, and by:

- the National Endowment for the Humanities,
- the National Historical Publications and Records Commission,
- the Packard Humanities Institute, and
- the University of Virginia.

== Selected reviews ==
- Reviews of The Papers of James Madison print editions
- Review of the digital edition: K. Potts, "The Papers of James Madison Digital Edition," CHOICE: Current Reviews for Academic Libraries, 48.8 (April 2011): 1461

== See also ==
- Founders Online
- The Papers of Thomas Jefferson
- The Papers of Abraham Lincoln
- The Washington Papers
- The Selected Papers of John Jay
- Adams Papers Editorial Project
- Papers of Martin Van Buren
