= Foreign relations of the United States (disambiguation) =

Foreign relations of the United States are the country's bilateral relations with other countries.

Foreign relations of the United States may also refer to:

- Foreign Relations of the United States (book series) (FRUS), published by the U.S. Department of State
- Foreign policy of the United States, goals and strategies of U.S. policy-makers
