= The Selected Papers of John Jay =

The Selected Papers of John Jay is an ongoing endeavor by scholars at Columbia University's Rare Book and Manuscript Library to organize, transcribe and publish a wide range of politically and culturally important letters authored by and written to American Founding Father John Jay that demonstrate the depth and breadth of Jay's contributions as a nation builder. More than 13,000 documents from over 75 university and historical collections have been compiled and photographed to date. Printed volumes illustrate Jay's roles as a patriot, jurist, diplomat, peacemaker and governor. As of January 2022, all seven planned chronological letterpress volumes have been published. A free searchable database of Jay's papers is available through Founders Online, a website maintained by the National Archives and Records Administration that also includes the writings and letters of Washington, Adams, Franklin, Jefferson, Madison, and Hamilton.

== History ==
The project was originally begun by noted American historian Richard B. Morris in the 1950s. As of Morris's death in 1989, only two volumes had been published. After more than a decade of little progress, new sources of underwriting helped reinvigorate the work. Under the leadership of documentary editor Elizabeth M. Nuxoll and other prominent Jay scholars, Volumes 1 through 7 of The Selected Papers of John Jay were published as a series by the University of Virginia Press.

In October 2010, the National Archives and University of Virginia Press announced their intention to create Founders Online, a public access website devoted to the writings of the Founding Fathers. The website went online in October 2013, providing free access to the complete record of six founders, plus a limited number of Jay's papers. In collaboration with Columbia University, the collection of Jay's writings and correspondence was expanded in 2020 with the addition of the first five volumes of The Selected Papers of John Jay. Founders Online also includes the annotated writings and correspondence of Benjamin Franklin, Alexander Hamilton, John Jay, Thomas Jefferson, James Madison, and George Washington in a searchable database of 185,000 individual documents drawn from the letterpress editions of the founders' papers.

In 2021, as Columbia's John Jay project reached completion, editors of the project together with Columbia University Libraries and the university's Office of the Provost hosted a two-day symposium featuring the research of numerous scholars with a keynote address by historian Joanne B. Freeman.

== Funding ==
The National Historical Publications and Records Commission (a division of the National Archives), National Endowment for the Humanities, and Columbia University Libraries are the primary sponsors of the Selected Papers of John Jay project with additional support from private foundations and Columbia University Law School.

== See also ==
- Founders Online
- The Washington Papers
- Adams Papers Editorial Project
- The Papers of Thomas Jefferson
- The Papers of James Madison
