= DBQ =

DBQ or dBq may refer to:

- Document-based question
- Dubuque Regional Airport (IATA: DBQ, ICAO: KDBQ)
- Dubuque, Iowa
- dBq, dB(quarterwave), the gain of an antenna compared to a quarter wavelength whip.
- Dave Brubeck Quartet
