= Adams Papers Editorial Project =

The Adams Papers Editorial Project is an ongoing project by historians and documentary editors at Massachusetts Historical Society to organize, transcribe, and publish a wide range of manuscripts, diaries, letterbooks and politically and culturally important letters authored by and received by the family of Founding Father John Adams, his wife Abigail Adams and their family, including John Quincy Adams. Over 27,000 records have been catalogued to date. Administrators of the database also track the location and content of Adams related materials at other scholarly institutions. By virtue of its collaborative nature, the project simultaneously sheds light on the lives of John Adams’ fellow Founding Fathers George Washington, John Jay, Benjamin Franklin, Thomas Jefferson, James Madison and Alexander Hamilton.

== History ==
The project was originally begun in 1954 by historian Lyman H. Butterfield. Butterfield introduced a system of transcription, annotation, and collation methods for the archive informed by his experience at Princeton University's The Papers of Thomas Jefferson project. Following the publication of the project's first volumes in 1961, President John F. Kennedy hailed the project as a "formidable record of a formidable family deserves the kind of great editorial support it is now receiving".

Since that time, more than 50 volumes have been published by Harvard University Press. The collection has been organized as a series. Series I includes transcriptions of the diaries of John Adams, John Quincy Adams, and others. Series II is a compilation of personal Adams Family correspondence exchanged between 1761 and 1798. Series III includes papers and legal instruments dated 1755 through 1785. Series IV is a record of visual documentation of John and Abigail Adams, as well as John Quincy Adams and his wife Louisa, from paintings to engravings. Items range in date from 1639 to 1889.

=== Digitized collections ===
The Adams Papers Digital Edition is available through the Massachusetts Historical Society's website. It has also been published online as part of the University of Virginia Press's Rotunda project, which offers a subscription-based service focusing a comprehensive collection of papers from America's Founding Era.

In October 2010, the National Archives and Records Administration and University of Virginia Press announced their intention to create Founders Online, a public access website devoted to the writings of the Founding Fathers, encompassing the papers of Madison as well as six other founders. The website went online in October 2013, providing free access to the complete record of Adams' writings, speeches, and correspondence. The Founders Online project also includes the annotated writings and correspondence of Benjamin Franklin, Alexander Hamilton, John Jay, Thomas Jefferson, James Madison, and George Washington. The site's searchable database includes 185,000 individual documents that have been drawn from the letterpress editions of the founders' papers.

== Funding ==
Primary funders of the Adams Papers currently include the National Historical Publications and Records Commission (NHPRC), a division of the National Archives and Records Administration, the National Endowment for the Humanities, and the Packard Humanities Institute.

== See also ==
- Founders Online
- The Papers of Benjamin Franklin
- The Papers of James Madison
- The Papers of Thomas Jefferson
- The Selected Papers of John Jay
- The Washington Papers
