= Foreign Relations of the United States (book series) =

Official record of U.S. foreign policy, compiled and published by the U.S. government

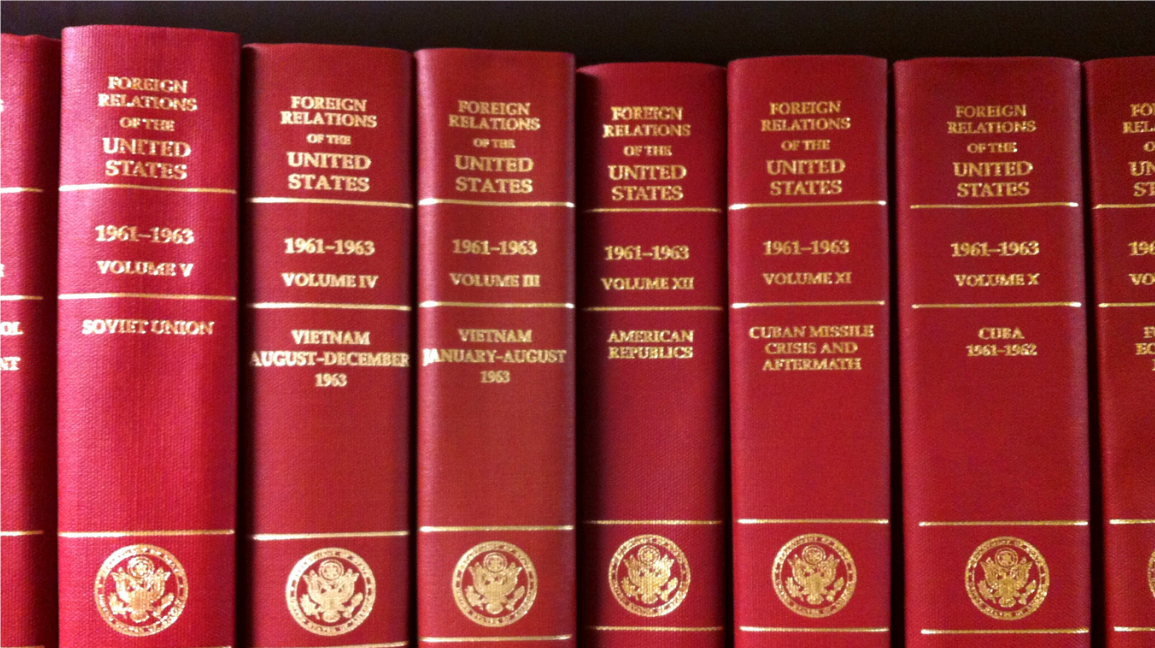
Volumes of the series

Foreign Relations of the United States (FRUS) is a book series published by the Office of the Historian in the United States Department of State. It presents the official documentary historical record of major U.S. foreign policy decisions and significant diplomatic activities. The series began in 1861 and now comprises more than 450 individual volumes. The volumes published over the last two decades increasingly contain declassified records from all the foreign affairs agencies.

== Overview ==
Foreign Relations volumes contain documents from presidential libraries, Departments of State and Defense, National Security Council, Central Intelligence Agency, Agency for International Development, and other foreign affairs agencies as well as the private papers of individuals involved in formulating U.S. foreign policy.

A team of documentary editors within the Office of the Historian selects documents and adds annotations. After a multi-agency declassification review, the volumes are published on the Historian's website, with printed volumes available from the Government Publishing Office.

Volumes in the series since 1952 are organized chronologically according to presidential administrations, and geographically and topically within each subseries: 25 volumes cover the Kennedy administration (1961–63), 34 cover the Johnson administration (1964–68), and about 54 are scheduled for the Nixon and Ford administration administrations (1969–76). Volumes on the Carter administration are now being published and volumes on the Reagan administration are now being researched and annotated.

Prior to 1970, the series was published under various names. From 1870 to 1947, the uniform title Papers Relating to the Foreign Relations of the United States was used. From 1947 to 1969, the name was changed to Foreign Relations of the United States: Diplomatic Papers. After that date, the current name was adopted.

FRUS has had numerous subseries, appendices and microfiche supplements over the years as warranted. Indexes were issued covering the years 1861–1999 and 1900–1918.

== E-books ==
The Office of the Historian offers e-book editions of a growing number of volumes from the series. Far lighter and more portable than printed editions of FRUS, the e-book edition offers the full content of each volume and makes use of the full-text search and other reading features of most e-book devices and applications, including bookmarking and note-taking. Unlike the web-based edition of FRUS, the e-book edition, once downloaded, can be accessed even without internet connectivity.

== Citation information ==
The title Foreign Relations of the United States is commonly abbreviated as FRUS in citations and the volume number written as a Roman numeral. The series is categorized by year and region, such as 1936, Volume II, Europe.

== Criticisms ==
In a 2013 report on the status of FRUS, Richard Immerman, Chairman of the Office of the Historian's Historical Advisory Council, stated that "Because the Foreign Relations series serves as the primary venue for publishing documentation on the role of intelligence activities in U.S. foreign relations, it has become renowned internationally for its openness. This universal acclaim well serves America's national interest," but added, "This barometer of openness, however, has created substantial delays in the declassification and publication processes over which HO has limited control." To that end, N. Richard Kinsman cited "serious, cumulative, and long-term deleterious effects on the Agency as a result of specific citations by name to CIA in the FRUS" and that "Explicit FRUS citations of CIA activities in specific countries constitute de facto admission of a CIA presence abroad, a direct contradiction of current policy to deny an official CIA presence abroad." In rebuttal, Warren F. Kimball cited the unlikelihood of the documents—30 or more years old and properly vetted before publication—posing any risk.

The series has been frequently criticised for omitting mentions of controversial US foreign policies, due to limitations on the declassification of historical documents. In the late 1980s and early 90s, growing concerns over the accuracy of the series's coverage of the Cold War era led to a 1991 Congressional statute to provide it with a legal mandate for timeliness and comprehensiveness. Incidents alleged to be omitted or censored include the U.S. government's covert involvement in the 1953 Iranian coup d'état, the 1954 Guatemalan coup d'état, the 1960 assassination of Patrice Lumumba, and the Indonesian mass killings of 1965–66. In 2022, the digital volume on the Reagan administration’s foreign policy was no longer available.
