= Document-based question =

Form of essay in US history exams

In American Advanced Placement exams, a document-based question (DBQ), also known as data-based question, is an essay or series of short-answer questions that is constructed by students using their own knowledge combined with support from several provided sources or documents. Usually, it is employed on timed history tests.

== In the United States ==
The document based question was first used for the 1973 AP United States History Exam published by the College Board, created as a joint effort between Development Committee members Reverend Giles Hayes and Stephen Klein. Both were unhappy with student performance on free-response essays, and often found that students were "groping for half-remembered information" and "parroted factual information with little historical analysis or argument" when they wrote their essays. The goal of the Document Based Question was for students to be "less concerned with the recall of previously learned information" and more engaged in deeper historical inquiry. Hayes, in particular, hoped students would "become junior historians and play the role of historians for that hour" as they engaged in the DBQ.

A typical DBQ is a packet of several original sources (anywhere from three to sixteen), labeled by letters (beginning with "Document A" or "Source A") or numbers. Usually all but one or two source(s) are textual, with the other source(s) being graphic (usually a political cartoon, map, or poster if primary and a chart or graph if secondary). In most cases, the sources are selected to provide different perspectives or views on the events or movements being analyzed.

On the Advanced Placement (AP) exams, only primary sources are provided; on the International Baccalaureate (IB) exams, both primary and secondary sources are provided. AP exams also require students to construct and defend a thesis based on one prompt, while IB exams focus on a series of questions, with at least one asking students to assess the "value and limitations" of a source, usually "with reference to the documents' origin or purpose."

The documents contained in the document-based questions are rarely familiar texts (for example, the Emancipation Proclamation and Declaration of Independence are not likely to be on a U.S. history test), though the documents' authors may be major historical figures. The documents vary in length and format, and are often drawn from documentary editing projects.

On some tests students are not permitted to begin responding to the question or questions in the essay packet until after a mandatory reading time ("planning period"), usually around 10 to 15 minutes. During this time, students read the passage and, if desired, make notes or markings. After this period, students are permitted to respond, usually for around 45 minutes to an hour.
