= The Washington Papers =

Project for George and Martha Washington's papers

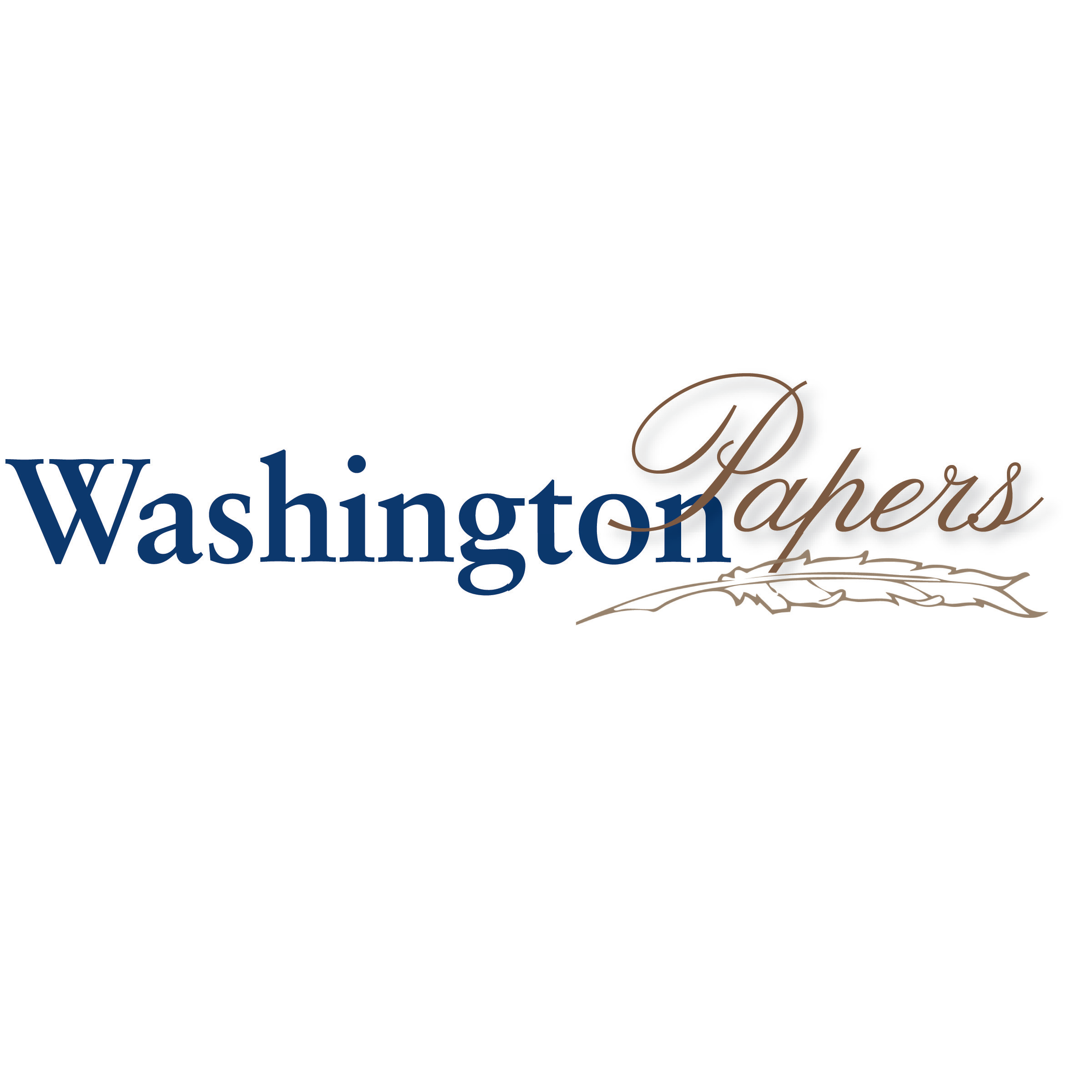
Logo

The Washington Papers, also known as The Papers of George Washington, is a project dedicated to the documentary publication of comprehensive letterpress and digital editions of George and Martha Washington's papers. Founded at the University of Virginia in 1968 as the Papers of George Washington, the Washington Papers is an expansive project that includes the papers and documents of George Washington as well as of individuals close to him. The Washington Papers aims to place Washington in a larger context and to bring individuals, such as Martha Washington and Washington family members, into sharper focus. The project is currently headed by editor in chief and director Jennifer E. Steenshorne, and is the largest collection of its type. The project is funded in part by the National Endowment for the Humanities, the National Historical Publications and Records Commission, the Packard Humanities Institute, the Mount Vernon Ladies' Association, the University of Virginia, the Florence Gould Foundation, and other private donors.

The project should be distinguished from the Archives of George Washington, part of which resides at the Library of Virginia, and the George Washington Papers, American Memory database at the Library of Congress. Both of the aforementioned archives hold some of Washington's original correspondence, whereas the Washington Papers holds copies of these documents, along with copies of related documents, that are accompanied by transcriptions and annotations. The Washington Papers are used to provide researchers with a different form of access than the ones offered by the Library of Virginia and American Memory by way of increased ease of reading, both in legibility and in context.

== History ==
The project had its start in 1966 when the state archivist of Virginia proposed that the university launch a documentary editing project for the Washington papers. Two years later the Washington Papers was launched with the help of the Mount Vernon Ladies’ Association. Its first editor-in-chief, Donald Jackson, was appointed and the project sought to "be the most comprehensive compilation yet and include not just letters Washington wrote, but those he received". To this end the project sought out and procured copies of 140,000 documents. This caused the project to differ from other collections that only collected material written by Washington and the idea behind the move was to provide a more comprehensive overview of Washington that would make for more thorough research.

Starting in 1976 the Washington Papers project began releasing sets of its collection via the University Press of Virginia. Sets are separated into different collections depending on the type of material and the time period. In 2004 the project digitized the collection with the help of the Ladies' Association and the University of Virginia Press’s digital database. The digitized collection was called the Papers of George Washington Digital Edition and is regularly updated. The following year the project presented the White House with a full set of the Papers of George Washington. In 2010 the National Historical Publications and Records Commission and the University of Virginia Press announced a new project, Founders Online, which would provide users with free access to papers relating to the Founding Fathers.

== Expansions ==
Since its inception the project has expanded to include several projects that are intended to help increase the availability and understanding of the collection. Some of the expansions have been done as part of larger projects with other organizations such as NARA.

=== Founders Online ===
In October 2010, NARA and the University of Virginia Press announced their intention to create Founders Online, a website devoted to the papers of the Founding Fathers, including Washington and six other founders. Work on the project began in October 2011 and went online in October 2013, providing free public access to the print volumes of the Washington Papers. Prior to this, the papers were available online through the Papers of George Washington Digital Edition. The Founders Online project also encompasses the writings and letters of John Adams, Benjamin Franklin, Alexander Hamilton, John Jay, Thomas Jefferson, and James Madison. The site's searchable database allows access to 185,000 individual documents.

=== The George Washington Financial Papers project ===
The Financial Papers Project was officially launched in 2011 with grant funding from NARA. It is a digital-only documentary edition of the Papers of George Washington and is intended to create a free-access Internet database containing accurate transcriptions of Washington’s financial documents, including ledgers, account books, receipts, and other items.

=== Bibliography project ===
The Bibliography Project is an ongoing project that was started in 2012 and is intended to create a comprehensive database that catalogues and describes the numerous resources, including children’s books, written about George Washington. Once completed, the project will provide users with access to material that will describe the context and meaning of each text that significantly portrays George Washington.

=== Martha Washington Papers project ===
The Martha Washington Papers project was launched in July 2015 and will collect correspondence sent to and from the First Lady, a task made difficult by the fact that she burned much of her correspondence with Washington following his death. The Washington Papers intend to publish her correspondence online and in a two-volume print edition.

=== Barbados Diary Project ===
Work on the Barbados Diary project began in the summer of 2015. The project will transcribe George Washington’s ship log and diary from his journey to Barbados with his brother Lawrence in 1751. Once completed, the material and its annotations will be available in both digital and letterpress editions

=== Outreach Projects ===
The Washington Papers has organized several outreach projects, several of which are aimed at educating primary and secondary students. Two examples of these programs include the Day by Day project, which shows users what George Washington was doing on a particular day, and the Teacher Internship program, which invites K-12 educators to spend their summers in a role at the Papers that helps them further their professional development through increased experience with primary source documents and scholarship in early American history.

== Publications ==
The Washington Papers has released several volumes of work relating to and reprinting the Washingtons' papers, beginning with a six-volume set of George Washington's diaries in 1976. All work has been published through the University of Virginia's university press, the University Press of Virginia, and the full set is expected to span 90 volumes, the last of which is projected to release around 2023. To date 63 volumes have been published.

=== Washington Diaries ===
The Diaries of George Washington is a six-volume set released between 1976 and 1979 that was edited by Dorothy Twohig, the third editor-in-chief of the Washington Papers project. The diaries cover most of Washington's adult life starting in 1748 and concluding in 1799, shortly before his death. There are some gaps in the collection due to some of Washington's diaries having never been found.

=== Presidential proceedings ===
In 1981 the project released The Journal of the Proceedings of the President, 1793–1797, a two-volume set of papers submitted to Washington during his presidency between the years of 1793 and 1797. Also edited by Twohig, the papers were maintained by Washington's secretaries Tobias Lear and Bartholomew Dandridge, and are written in the first person. Per the project's website, the project "[throws] considerable light on presidential and cabinet participation in decision-making during Washington's administration" due to the scarcity of records relating to the War Department during this point in time and because of the gap in Washington's diaries. The collection was edited by Dorothy Twohig.

=== Colonial papers ===
The Papers of George Washington. The Colonial Series, 1744–June 1775 is a ten-volume set that covers Washington's time during the French and Indian War, his work as a Virginia planter, and his life between the years of 1744 and 1775, which includes his time surveying the Great Dismal Swamp. The collection was edited by W.W. Abbot, the second editor-in-chief of the project, and Dorothy Twohig.

=== Revolutionary War papers ===
The Papers of George Washington. The Revolutionary War Series, June 1775–December 1783 is an ongoing collection that currently spans 23 volumes, the first of which was released in 1985. The set has been edited by W. W. Abbot, Dorothy Twohig, Philander D. Chase, Theodore J. Crackel and Edward G. Lengel, and covers Washington's papers from the Revolutionary War.

=== Confederation papers ===
The Papers of George Washington. The Confederation Series, January 1784-September 1788 is a six-volume set that was released between 1992 and 1997, and was edited by W. W. Abbot and Dorothy Twohig. The volumes cover Washington's life at Mount Vernon after the Revolutionary War, resulting in most of the papers being of a personal nature rather than official.

=== Presidential papers ===
The Papers of George Washington. The Presidential Series, September 1788–March 1797 is an ongoing series of books that covers Washington's time served as the fledgling country's first President. The set includes papers written by the President as well as material presented to him during his presidency, and papers from his personal, social and business life. The volumes have been edited by W. W. Abbot, Dorothy Twohig, Philander D. Chase, Theodore J. Crackel and Edward G. Lengel, and is currently number 18, the first of which was released in 1987.

=== Retirement papers ===
The Papers of George Washington. The Retirement Series, March 1797–December 1799 is a four-volume set of papers that covers Washington's life in retirement, starting in March 1797. The set was released between 1998 and 1999 and was edited by Dorothy Twohig. While Washington primarily remained close to Mount Vernon during his retirement, he still remained active with his landholdings in the West and remained aware of the political state of the nation.

== Awards ==
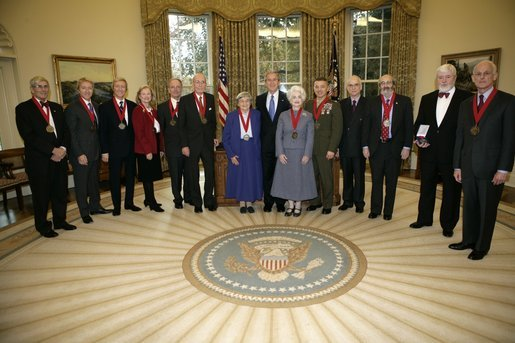
Former Editor-in-Chief Ted Crackel stands second from the right with President George W. Bush and the recipients of the 2005 National Humanities Medal.

The project and its members have received several awards for work done with the project, which includes a 2005 National Humanities Medal awarded by President George W. Bush.

- Lyman H. Butterfield Award for excellence in the publication of documentary editions from The Association for Documentary Editing (1986, won)
- Thomas Jefferson Prize from the Society for History in the Federal Government (2003, won - Dr. Christine Sternberg Patrick, for editing Presidential Series volume 11)
- National Humanities Medal (2005, won)
- Outstanding Academic Title by the American Library Association's Choice magazine (2007, for the Papers of George Washington Digital Edition)

== See also ==
- Bibliography of George Washington
- Founders Online
  - Adams Papers Editorial Project
  - The Papers of Benjamin Franklin
  - The Papers of James Madison
  - The Papers of Thomas Jefferson
  - The Selected Papers of John Jay
- List of George Washington articles
- List of presidents of the United States
- List of presidents of the United States by previous experience
