= University of Virginia Press =

University press

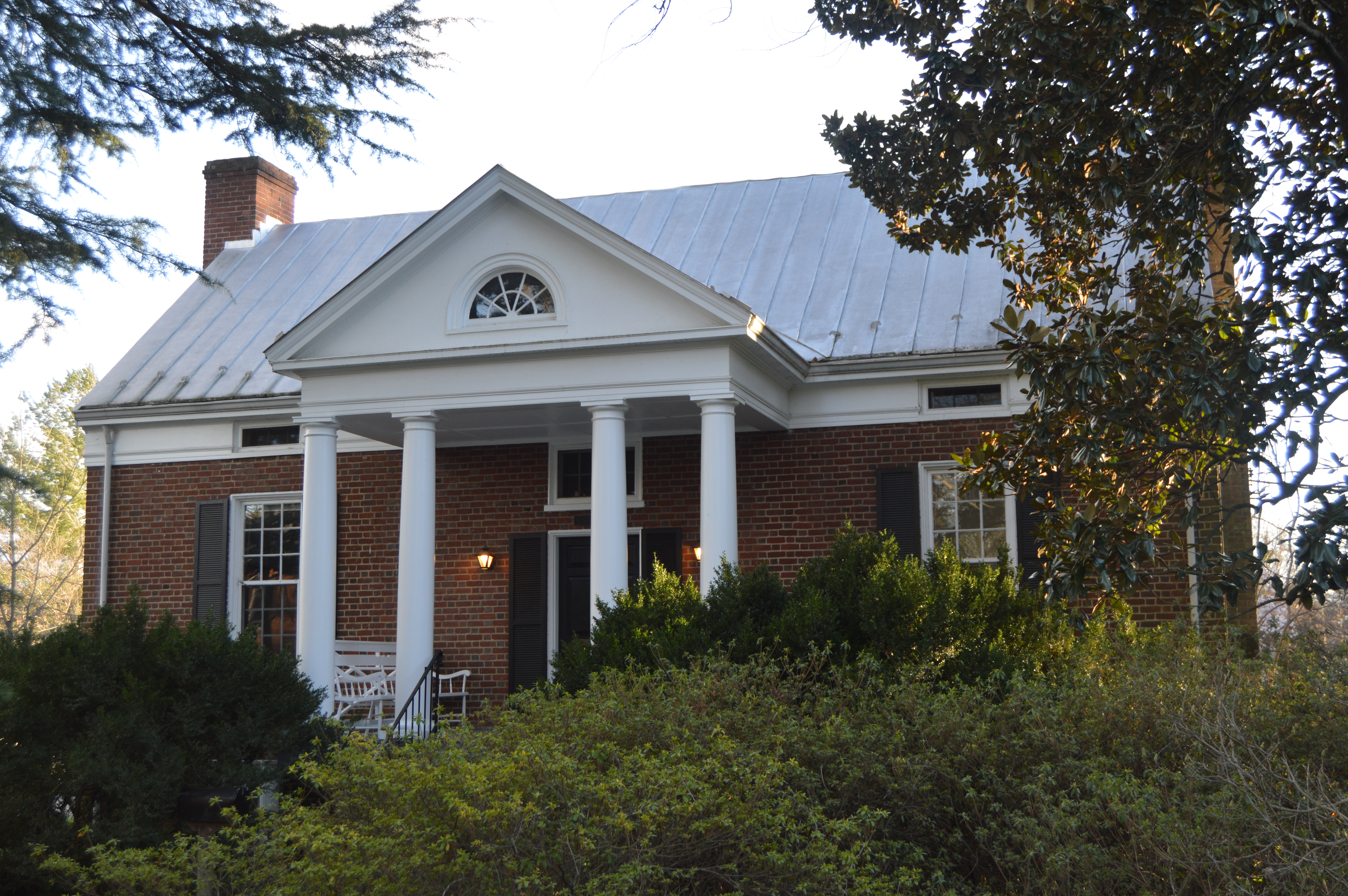
- UVA Press offices in Charlottesville
- Parent company: University of Virginia
- Founded: 1963
- Country of origin: United States
- Headquarters location: Charlottesville, Virginia
- Distribution: Longleaf Services (US); Eurospan Group (EMEA); Scholarly Book Services (Canada); East-West Export Books (Hawaii, Asia, Australasia)
- Publication types: Books
- Official website: www.upress.virginia.edu

The University of Virginia Press (or UVaP) is a university press that is part of the University of Virginia. It was established in 1963 as the University Press of Virginia, under the initiative of the university's then President, Edgar F. Shannon Jr. Victor Reynolds, previously director of the Cornell University Press, was the first director.

== History ==
The first two publications of the press were reprints of works by Carl Bridenbaugh. The first original book, published in May 1964, was A Voyage to Virginia in 1609, Two Narratives, an edition of William Strachey's True Reportory and Silvester Jourdain's A Discovery of The Barmudas, edited by Folger Shakespeare Library director Louis Booker Wright. Walker Cowen was the second director of the press, and was succeeded by Nancy Essig in 1988. Penelope Kaiserlian served as director from 2001 until her retirement in 2012. The press's name was changed to the University of Virginia Press in 2002. Mark Saunders succeeded Kaiserlian as director after her retirement.

Suzanne Morse Moomaw, an associate professor of urban and environmental planning in UVA's School of Architecture and director of the Community Design Research Center who served on the press's board of directors since 2015, the last two years as chair, was named director in January, 2020 following the death of Mark Saunders.

Domestic distribution for the press is currently provided by the University of North Carolina Press's Longleaf Services.

== See also ==
- List of English-language book publishing companies
- List of university presses
- Founders Online
