= Documentary editing =

Editing of historic documents for publication

Documentary editing is a process involving the publication of documents, selected from archives, museums, libraries and other institutional or private collections. A documentary editor selects documents and also annotates them to add context. The documents are then published, serving as primary source material for researchers. Documentary editing thus enables scholars, journalists and other researchers and interested readers to approach and analyze the contents of documents, without visiting them directly in institutional or private collections.

The specific editorial methodologies for various types of documents are developed and defined by archival science and other auxiliary sciences of history.

== Terminology ==
The term documentary editing is often confused with the editing of documentary films. Mary-Jo Kline, the author of a key introductory book on the subject, remarked that she once found her treatise in the "movies and film" section of the bookstore.

Documentary editing grew out of the related field of scholarly editing. Documentary editors support historic scholarship by editing archival primary sources, whereas scholarly editors can support a broader range of disciplines using a wider variety of sources. Some editing projects overlap both terms, especially those related to literary analysis, which can involve both genetic editing of a literary work, and the documentary editing of associated primary sources.

== History ==
Documentary editing began out of a desire for historians to provide a foundation for future scholars. The field grew in the late 1800s, with much of the work motivated by a desire to promote pride in local and national history. By the 1930s, documentary editing emerged as a specialization of professional archivists.

By the late 1970s, documentary editing began using digital automation, and by the early 2000s, electronic publication was preferred over printed volumes.

== Themes of projects ==
Documentary editing projects can be classified by the theme of the documents published.

Common themes included:

- The papers of an individual, such as The Papers of George Washington.
- Diplomatic documents of a country, such as the Foreign Relations of the United States series.
- An historic event, such as the University of Maryland's Freedmen and Southern Society Project.

== Process ==
=== Selection ===
Documentary editors are forced to be selective when choosing which archival documents to edit and publish. Although the selection process is key to appraising the evidentiary value of the published documents, later scholars often lack the means to assess the original editor's selection decisions.

Common selection criteria include

- Prioritizing documents that establish the significance of the publication's topic.
- Avoiding redundant documents on routine matters.
- Emphasizing documents not previously published.

Editors must also abide by any terms imposed by the custodian of the records. If the records are held in private collections, editors may persuade the owners to allow publication by noting that the originals of source documents can fetch higher prices at rare book auctions, a phenomenon termed "imprimatur value" by Katharine Leab.

=== Annotation ===
An annotated document, as published in FRUS

Annotation helps readers understand the context of the published documents.

Common annotations include:

- Information available to the contemporary audience, such as if a letter was received by the addresses.
- Explanations of obscure language.
- Clarification of persons or events only partially identified in the original text.
- Cross-references to other documents.

Typographic errors may be annotated sic, or may be silently emended without annotation. Older texts may reflect historic orthography, requiring so much annotation that some editors omit sic to avoid distracting readers. Sic may also be omitted when the error is passim, even in more modern documents. For example, a publication of Irish diplomatic documents chose to not insert sic at each misusage of "England" as "Britain", choosing instead to explain the convention in their introduction.

Excessive annotations can cause a documentary publication to be regarded as secondary source, instead of as a compilation of primary sources. Editors try to strike a balance between "letting the documents tell the story" and providing sufficient context to readers who may lack the editor's subject matter expertise.

== Manner of publication ==
=== Print volumes ===
Documentary editors historically published printed volumes.

Printed volumes may contain transcribed documents, necessitating "a fair amount of hack work" to copy the text. The texts of documents may be published in full, or be summarized to retain all important content, but to exclude more trivial and incidental matter. An abstracted text of this type is known in British English as a "calendar", although in American English that term is more typically applied to a more basic inventory of documents.

An alternative form of publication is photographic facsimiles. Facsimile editions are traditionally more costly, but allow a closer fidelity to the original documents.

Printed books, although less convenient than electronic editions, may help increase an editing project's accessibility and alleviate concerns about digital obsolescence.

=== Microform ===
Microform publication reduces costs, while allowing editors to avoid rote transcription. Microform editions typically have minimal, if any annotation.

Microform publication is only suitable for legible documents, and works poorly on handwritten documents. Microform editions are usually accompanied by a printed index, which many libraries store separately from the microform, potentially frustrating researchers.

Compared with printed editions, microform editions are less selective, and the large number of published documents can make it difficult for readers to find germane content.

=== Electronic publication ===
Electronic publication allows documentary editors the fidelity of facsimiles, but without the added printing cost. Further, as the archivist David Ferriero observed, electronic publication relieves library access services of the burden of reshelving heavy volumes.

The transition to electronic publication began when the United States National Archives commissioned a study on digital preservation in 1984. The report, which was delivered in 1991, focused on the potential for publication via digital optical media, such as CD-ROM. The technical standards recommended in the report were used in early electronic documentary editing projects.

As of the early 2010s, TEI format is preferred for electronic publication because of its extensibility and interoperability with other publishing tools.

== Academic role ==
Documentary editing is foundational to modern historic scholarship. Primary sources are, after an editing project, both accessible and understandable to broader audience. A publication can serve to illustrate an historic field, drawing interest to a topic.

Documentary editing also serves a pedagogical function. Document-based questions, common in secondary school history classes, draw upon edited documents to measure student skills at historic analysis. Editing may also offer undergraduates an opportunity at historic research.

== See also ==
- Historical sources
- Diplomatics
- Nachlass
- Text publication society
- Textual criticism
- Textual scholarship
