= John Leonard Prize =

Annual American literary award

- Awarded for: Author's first books in any genre
- Sponsored by: National Book Critics Circle
- First award: 2013
- Website: https://www.bookcritics.org/awards/leonard-prize/

The John Leonard Prize for Best First Book, established in 2013, is an annual literary award presented by the National Book Critics Circle (NBCC) for authors' first books in any genre. Unlike other NBCC awards, recipients are selected by members, not the board.

The prize is named after John Leonard, a renowned literary critic and NBCC co-founder.

== Recipients ==
John Leonard Prize winners and honors
| Year | Author | Title | Result | Ref. |
|---|---|---|---|---|
| 2013 | Anthony Marra | A Constellation of Vital Phenomena | Winner | |
| 2014 | Phil Klay | Redeployment | Winner | |
| 2015 | Kirstin Valdez Quade | Night at the Fiestas | Winner | |
| 2016 | Yaa Gyasi | Homegoing | Winner | |
| 2016 | Brit Bennett | The Mothers | Finalist | |
| 2016 | Emma Cline | The Girls | Finalist | |
| 2016 | Nicole Dennis-Benn | Here Comes the Sun | Finalist | |
| 2016 | Nathan Hill | The Nix | Finalist | |
| 2016 | Max Porter | Grief Is the Thing with Feathers | Finalist | |
| 2017 | Carmen Maria Machado | Her Body and Other Parties | Winner | |
| 2017 | Lesley Nneka Arimah | What It Means When a Man Falls from the Sky | Finalist | |
| 2017 | Julie Buntin | Marlena | Finalist | |
| 2017 | Zinzi Clemmons | What We Lose | Finalist | |
| 2017 | Layli Long Soldier | Whereas | Finalist | |
| 2017 | Gabriel Tallent | My Absolute Darling | Finalist | |
| 2018 | Tommy Orange | There There | Winner | |
| 2019 | Sarah M. Broom | The Yellow House | Winner | |
| 2019 | Taffy Brodesser-Akner | Fleishman Is in Trouble | Finalist | |
| 2019 | Chia-Chia Lin | The Unpassing | Finalist | |
| 2019 | T Kira Madden | Long Live the Tribe of Fatherless Girls: A Memoir | Finalist | |
| 2019 | Julia Phillips | Disappearing Earth | Finalist | |
| 2019 | Jia Tolentino | Trick Mirror: Reflections on Self-Delusion | Finalist | |
| 2019 | Bryan Washington | Lot: Stories | Finalist | |
| 2020 | Raven Leilani | Luster | Winner | |
| 2020 | Megha Majumdar | A Burning | Finalist | |
| 2020 | C Pam Zhang | How Much of These Hills Is Gold | Finalist | |
| 2020 | Kerri Arsenault | Mill Town: Reckoning with What Remains | Finalist | |
| 2020 | Brandon Taylor | Real Life | Finalist | |
| 2020 | Douglas Stuart | Shuggie Bain | Finalist | |
| 2020 | Karla Cornejo Villavicencio | The Undocumented Americans | Finalist | |
| 2021 | Anthony Veasna So | Afterparties | Winner | |
| 2021 | Torrey Peters | Detransition, Baby | Finalist | |
| 2021 | Jocelyn Nicole Johnson | My Monticello | Finalist | |
| 2021 | Devon Walker-Figueroa | Philomath: Poems | Finalist | |
| 2021 | Larissa Pham | Pop Song: Adventures in Art & Intimacy | Finalist | |
| 2021 | Ashley C. Ford | Somebody's Daughter: A Memoir | Finalist | |
| 2022 | Morgan Talty | Night of the Living Rez | Winner | |
| 2022 | Jessamine Chan | The School for Good Mothers | Finalist | |
| 2022 | Jonathan Escoffery | If I Survive You | Finalist | |
| 2022 | Tess Gunty | The Rabbit Hutch | Finalist | |
| 2022 | Zain Khalid | Brother Alive | Finalist | |
| 2022 | Maud Newton | Ancestor Trouble | Finalist | |
| 2022 | Vauhini Vara | The Immortal King Rao | Finalist | |
| 2023 | Tahir Hamut Izgil | Waiting to Be Arrested at Night | Winner | |
| 2023 | Ariana Benson | Black Pastoral | Finalist | |
| 2023 | Emilie Boone | A Nimble Arc | Finalist | |
| 2023 | Victor Heringer trans. James Young | The Love of Singular Men | Finalist | |
| 2024 | Tessa Hulls | Feeding Ghosts: A Graphic Memoir | Winner | |
| 2024 | Carrie Courogen | Miss May Does Not Exist: The Life and Work of Elaine May, Hollywood's Hidden Genius | Finalist | |
| 2024 | Vinson Cunningham | Great Expectations | Finalist | |
| 2024 | John Ganz | When the Clock Broke: Con Men, Conspiracists, and How America Cracked Up in the Early 1990s | Finalist | |
| 2024 | Cindy Juyoung Ok | Ward Toward | Finalist | |
| 2024 | Rebecca Nagle | By the Fire We Carry: The Generations-Long Fight for Justice on Native Land | Finalist | |
| 2025 | Nicholas Boggs | Baldwin: A Love Story | Winner | |
| 2025 | Evanthia Bromiley | Crown | Finalist | |
| 2025 | Saou Ichikawa (trans. by Polly Barton) | Hunchback | Finalist | |
| 2025 | Liz Pelly | Mood Machine: The Rise of Spotify and the Costs of the Perfect Playlist | Finalist | |
| 2025 | Hedgie Choi | Salvage | Finalist | |
| 2025 | Lucas Schaefer | The Slip | Finalist | |
