= Chill-out music =

Form of popular music

Chill-out (shortened as chill; also typeset as chillout or chill out) is a loosely defined form of popular music characterized by slow tempos and relaxed moods. The definition of "chill-out music" has evolved throughout the decades, and generally refers to anything that might be identified as a modern type of easy listening.

The term "chill-out music" – originally conflated with "ambient house" – came from an area called "The White Room" at the Heaven nightclub in London in 1989. There, DJs played ambient mixes from sources such as Brian Eno and Pink Floyd to allow dancers a place to "chill out" from the faster-paced music of the main dance floor. Ambient house became widely popular over the next decade before it declined due to market saturation.

== Origins and definition ==
"Deepecho" (2008)
A free chill-out track produced by a Wikipedia editor. It runs at 95 BPM and is in the key of C minor.

There is no exact definition of chill-out music. The term, which has evolved throughout the decades, generally refers to anything that might be identified as a modern type of easy listening. Some of the genres associated with "chill" include downtempo, classical, dance, jazz, hip-hop, world, pop, lounge, and ambient. Chill-out typically has slow rhythms, sampling, a "trance-like nature", "drop-out beats", and a mixture of electronic instruments with acoustic instruments. In the "Ambient/Chill Out" chapter of Rick Snoman's 2013 book Dance Music Manual, he writes, "it could be said that as long as the tempo remains below 120 BPM and it employs a laid-back groove, it could be classed as chill out."

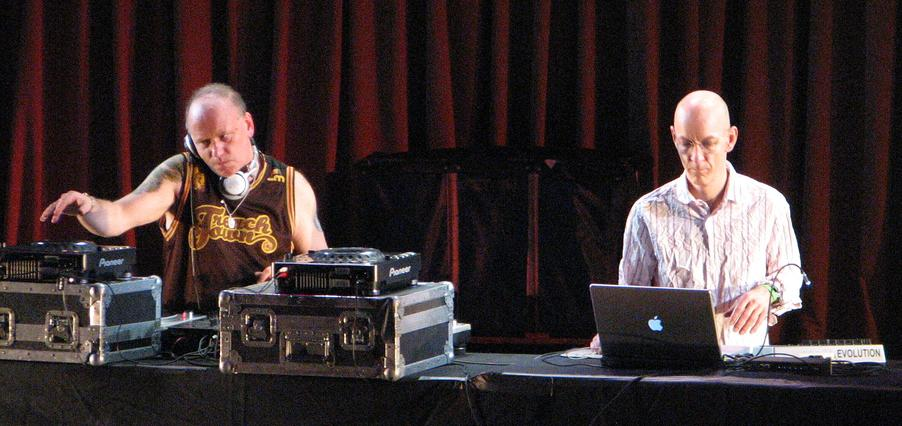
The Orb performing in 2006

The term originated from an area called "The White Room" at the Heaven nightclub in London in 1989. Its DJs were Jimmy Cauty and Alex Paterson, later of the Orb. They created ambient mixes from sources such as Brian Eno, Pink Floyd, Eagles (band), Mike Oldfield, 10cc, and War. The room's purpose was to allow dancers a chance to "chill out" from the more emphatic and fast-tempo music played usually in the discos. This also coincided with the short-lived fad of ambient house, also known as "New Age house". Cauty's KLF subsequently released an album called Chill Out (February 1990), featuring uncredited contributions from Paterson. In addition, during the early 1990s, the Beach Boys' Smiley Smile (1967) was reputed as one of the best "chill-out" albums to listen to during an LSD comedown.

Ambient house declined after the mid-1990s due to market saturation. In the early 2000s, DJs in Ibiza's Café del Mar began creating ambient house mixes that drew on jazz, classical, Hispanic, and new age sources. They called their product "chill-out music", and it sparked a revived interest in ambient house from the public and record labels. The popularity of chill-out subsequently expanded to dedicated satellite radio channels, outdoor festivals, and the release of thousands of compilation albums offering ambient sounds and "muffled" beats. Consequently, the popular understanding of "chill-out music" shifted away from "ambient" into its own distinct genre. Music critics to that point were generally dismissive of the music.

== Streaming ==
Streaming became the dominant source of music industry revenue in 2016. During that decade, Spotify engendered a trend that became known among the industry as "lean back listening", which refers to a listener who "thinks less about the artist or album they are seeking out, and instead connects with emotions, moods, and activities". As of 2017, the front page of the service's "browse" screen included many algorithmically-selected playlists with names such as "Chilled Folk", "Chill Hits", "Evening Chill", "Chilled R&B", "Indie Chillout", and "Chill Tracks". In 2014, the service reported that throughout the year "Chill Out" playlists had trended much higher than the national average on campuses across Colorado, where marijuana had been legalized in January of that year. In an editorial piece for The Baffler titled "The Problem with Muzak", writer Liz Pelly criticized the "chill" playlists as "the purest distillation of [Spotify's] ambition to turn all music into emotional wallpaper".

== Associated terms ==
=== Chillwave ===
In 2009, a genre called "chillwave" was invented by the satirical blog Hipster Runoff for music that could already be described with existing labels such as dream pop. The pseudonymous author, known as "Carles", later explained that he was only "[throwing] a bunch of pretty silly names on a blog post and saw which one stuck." Chillwave became one of the first genres to acquire an identity online, although the term did not gain mainstream currency until early 2010, when it was the subject of serious, analytical articles by The Wall Street Journal and The New York Times. In 2011, Carles said it was "ridiculous that any sort of press took it seriously" and that although the bands he spoke to "get annoyed" by the tag, "they understand that it's been a good thing. What about iTunes making it an official genre? It's now theoretically a marketable indie sound."

=== Lofi hip hop ===
In 2013, YouTube began allowing its users to host live streams, which resulted in a host of 24-hour "radio stations" dedicated to microgenres such as vaporwave, a derivation of chillwave. Music streaming platform Spotify added to the popular "lo-fi beats" wave by generating "Spotified genres", including "Chill Hits", "Bedroom Pop" playlists, and promoting numerous "chill pop" artists. In 2017, a form of downtempo music tagged as "chillhop" or "lo-fi hip hop" became popular among YouTube music streamers. By 2018, several of these channels had attracted millions of followers and Spotify's "Chill Hits" playlist had 5.4 million listeners.

== See also ==
- Balearic beat – Subgenre of house music
- Chillout Sessions
- Criticism of Spotify – Criticism of music streaming service
- Groovera
- Illbient – Music genre
- Mood music – Popular music genre
- Space music – Tranquil, hypnotic subgenre of electronic music
- Sirius XM Chill
- Yacht rock – Neologism for 1970s–1980s soft rock music style
- Smooth jazz – Commercially oriented crossover jazz
- Soft rock – Music genre derived from popular and rock music
- The White Room
- Trip hop – Genre of electronic music
