= Truman Capote Award for Literary Criticism =

The Truman Capote Award for Literary Criticism is awarded for literary criticism by the University of Iowa on behalf of the Truman Capote Literary Trust. The award is regarded as the Pulitzer Prize of Literary Criticism. The value of the award is US$30,000, and is said to be the largest annual cash prize for literary criticism in the English language. The formal name of the prize is the Truman Capote Award for Literary Criticism in Memory of Newton Arvin, commemorating both Capote and his friend Newton Arvin, who was a distinguished critic and Smith College professor until he lost his job in 1960 after his homosexuality was publicly exposed.

== Recipients ==
- 1996 Helen Vendler – The Given and the Made: Strategies of Poetic Redefinition
- 1997 John Felstiner – Paul Celan: Poet, Survivor, Jew
- 1998 John Kerrigan – Revenge Tragedy: Aeschylus to Armageddon
- 1999 Charles Rosen – Romantic Poets, Critics, and Other Madmen
- 2000 Elaine Scarry – Dreaming by the Book and Philip Fisher – Still the New World: American Literature in a Culture of Creative Destruction
- 2001 Malcolm Bowie – Proust Among the Stars
- 2002 Declan Kiberd – Irish Classics
- 2003 Seamus Heaney – Finders Keepers: Selected Prose, 1971–2001
- 2004 Susan Stewart – Poetry and the Fate of the Senses
- 2005 Angus Fletcher – A New Theory for American Poetry
- 2006 Geoffrey Hartman and Daniel T. O'Hara – The Geoffrey Hartman Reader
- 2007 William H. Gass – A Temple of Texts
- 2008 Helen Small – The Long Life
- 2009 Geoffrey Hill – Collected Critical Writings
- 2010 Seth Lerer – Children's Literature: A Reader's History from Aesop to Harry Potter
- 2011 Mark McGurl – The Program Era: Postwar Fiction and the Rise of Creative Writing
- 2012 Elaine Showalter – A Jury of Her Peers: Celebrating American Women Writers from Anne Bradstreet to Annie Proulx
- 2013 Marina Warner – Stranger Magic: Charmed States and the Arabian Nights
- 2014 Fredric Jameson – The Antinomies of Realism
- 2015 Stanley Plumly – The Immortal Evening: A Legendary Dinner With Keats, Wordsworth, and Lamb
- 2016 Kevin Birmingham – The Most Dangerous Book: The Battle for James Joyce's Ulysses
- 2017 Gillian Beer – Alice in Space: The Sideways Victorian World of Lewis Carroll
- 2018 Robert Hass – A Little Book on Form: An Exploration into the Formal Imagination of Poetry
- 2019 Brent Hayes Edwards – Epistrophies: Jazz and the Literary Imagination
- 2020 Fred Moten – Black and Blur
- 2021 Kay Ryan – Synthesizing Gravity: Selected Prose
- 2022 Heather Clark – Red Comet: The Short Life and Blazing Art of Sylvia Plath
- 2023 R. A. Judy – Sentient Flesh: Thinking in Disorder, Poiēsis in Black
- 2024 Gene Andrew Jarrett — Paul Laurence Dunbar: The Life and Times of a Caged Bird
- 2025 Andrea Brady — Poetry and Bondage: A History and Theory of Lyric Constraint
- 2026 Nicholas Boggs — Baldwin: A Love Story
