= Plumly =

Plumly is a given name and surname. Notable people with the name include:

- Ruth Plumly Thompson (1891–1976), American writer
- Stanley Plumly (1939–2019), American poet
