= Criticism of Spotify =

Criticism of music streaming service

Spotify, a music streaming company, has attracted significant criticism since its 2008 launch, mainly over artist compensation. Unlike physical sales or downloads, which pay artists a fixed price per song or album sold, Spotify pays royalties based on the artist's "market share"—the number of streams for their songs as a proportion of total songs streamed on the service. Spotify distributes approximately 70% of its total revenue to rights holders, who then pay artists based on their individual agreements. Multiple artists have criticised the policy, including Taylor Swift and Thom Yorke, who temporarily withdrew their music from the service.

Spotify faces particular scrutiny due to its free service tier, which allows users to listen free with advertisements between tracks. The tier has led to a variety of major album releases being delayed or withdrawn from the service. Spotify claims it benefits the industry by migrating users away from piracy and less monetized platforms and encouraging them to upgrade to paid accounts. Record labels keep a large amount of Spotify earnings.

Spotify has also attracted media attention for several security breaches, as well as for controversial moves including a significant change to its privacy policy, "pay-for-play" practices based on receiving money from labels for putting specific songs on popular playlists, and allegedly creating "fake artists" for prominent playlist placement, which Spotify denies.

Spotify has also been accused of creating AI music of deceased artists.

Spotify CEO Daniel Ek has also been criticized by some musicians for investing in Helsing, a company that develops military strike drones and develops artificial intelligence for weapons systems.

== Business practices ==
=== Allegations of unfair artist compensation ===
Spotify, together with the music streaming industry in general, faces criticism from some artists and producers, claiming they are being unfairly compensated for their work as music sales decline and music streaming increases. Unlike physical sales or legal downloads, which pay artists a fixed price per song or album sold, Spotify pays royalties based on their "market share"—the number of streams for their songs as a proportion of total songs streamed on the service. Spotify distributes approximately 70% of its total revenue to rights-holders, who will then pay artists based on their individual agreements.

The variable nature of this compensation has led to criticism. In a 2009 Guardian article, Helienne Lindvall wrote about why "major labels love Spotify", writing that the labels receive 18% of shares from the streaming company—something that artists themselves never actually receive. She further wrote that "On Spotify, it seems, artists are not equal. There are indie labels that, as opposed to the majors and Merlin members, receive no advance, receive no minimum per stream, and only get a 50% share of ad revenue on a pro-rata basis (which so far has amounted to next to nothing)." In 2009, Swedish musician Magnus Uggla pulled his music from the service, stating that after six months he had earned "what a mediocre busker could earn in a day".

Norwegian newspaper Dagbladet reported in 2009 that the record label Racing Junior earned only NOK 19 (US$3.00) after their artists had been streamed over 55,100 times. According to an infographic by David McCandless, an artist on Spotify would need over four million streams per month to earn the U.S. minimum monthly wage of $1,160. In October 2011, U.S. independent label Projekt Records stated: "In the world I want to live in, I envision artists fairly compensated for their creations, because we (the audience) believe in the value of what artists create. The artist's passion, dedication, and expression is respected and rewarded. Spotify is NOT a service that does this. Projekt will not be part of this unprincipled concept."

In March 2012, Patrick Carney of The Black Keys said that "Spotify isn't fair to artists", and further commented that streaming services "are becoming more popular, but it still isn't at a point where you're able to replace royalties from record sales with the royalties from streams. For a band that makes a living selling music, it's not at a point where it's feasible for us." Replying to Spotify board member Sean Parker's claim that Spotify would make more money for the music industry than iTunes, Carney said: "That guy has $2 billion that he made from figuring out ways to steal royalties from artists, and that's the bottom line. You can't really trust anybody like that." In May 2012, British Theatre vocalist and Biffy Clyro touring guitarist Mike Vennart stated: "I'd sooner people stole my work than stream it from [Spotify]. They pay the artists virtually nothing. Literally pennies per month. Yet they make a killing. They've forced the sales way down in certain territories, which wouldn't be so bad if the bands actually got paid."

Singer David Byrne of Talking Heads criticized streaming services such as Spotify in October 2013, writing: "If artists have to rely almost exclusively on the income from these services, they'll be out of work within a year." Byrne concluded his piece by admitting "I don't have an answer." In March 2014, American funk band Vulfpeck exposed a loophole in Spotify's royalty calculation model. The band created an album titled Sleepify, which consisted solely of silence. The band asked users to stream the album on a loop while they slept to increase the amount of money earned. The album was pulled by Spotify in April 2014, citing unspecified service violation. Vulfpeck had accumulated enough streams to result in around $20,000 in royalties before the album was pulled. In July 2015, Neil Young removed almost all of his music from Spotify and other streaming services, citing low sound quality as the primary reason. He stated that he did not think his fans deserved the low quality they were receiving, and said it was bad for his music. Young's music later returned to Spotify and other streaming services.

Worldwide, 30,000 musicians have joined the organization UnionOfMusicians (UMAW). UMAW organized protests in 31 cities in March 2021 and its campaign #JusticeAtSpotify is demanding a compensation of one cent per stream. Moreover, they are asking for a fairer redistribution system, as smaller artists are disproportionately disadvantaged on Spotify.

On 29 June 2021, Digital Music News released an article titled "Spotify Executive Calls Artist 'Entitled' for Requesting Payment of One Penny Per Stream". The article covers the story of a Spotify Inventor Jim Anderson, who on 14 June 2019 responded in front of a live audience to the general allegation of unfair compensation when confronted about it by Ashley Jana, a producer/singer/songwriter who happened to be recording the event. Anderson was described on the Sync Summit June 2019 Agenda as "The man who built out the system architecture of Spotify". Ashley Jana released excerpts from his response in the form of an audio recording on YouTube on 26 November 2020. Some of the comments that Anderson made were the following: "So, maybe I should go down the entitlement road now? Or should I wait a few minutes?", "The problem is this. Spotify was created to solve a problem. The problem was this - piracy and music distribution. The problem was to get artists' music out there to solve a problem. The problem was not to pay people money", and "I think that Taylor Swift doesn't need .000001 cent more a stream". Following the release of the Digital Music News article, Business Insider also released their own take on the story with their article titled "Taylor Swift 'doesn't need' to earn streaming royalties according to a former Spotify boss who said the company is a distribution platform that wasn't built to pay artists money." Business Insider reported that "Spotify declined Business Insider's request for comment".

As of today, Spotify pays artists between $0.003 – $0.005 per stream on average, and there are multiple online tools to calculate how much an artist can make on royalties based on their streams.

==== Support to Spotify ====
In June 2012, Charles Caldas, CEO of the Merlin Network (a representative body for over 10,000 independent labels), clarified that Spotify pays royalties to the music labels, and not the artists. According to Caldas, the payments Merlin's labels received from Spotify rose 250 percent from the year ending March 2011 to the year ending March 2012, while at the time, the revenue per user was "the highest it has been since the launch of the service". Caldas said that Merlin had observed "consistent, ongoing growth on revenue per user, revenue per stream, and the total revenue" that Spotify generates for the labels it represents. "The thing about 'Spotify doesn't pay artists enough'—Spotify doesn't pay artists... They pay labels", said Caldas.

Caldas also highlighted the issue of time lag for artists, as they are not gaining an impression of Spotify's status at the time they receive their payments. They are "getting reporting quarterly, or six-monthly, on sales that happened six months ago." Caldas explained that "royalty statements could be a year old".

In February 2015, Music Business Worldwide reported on a French study between music trade body SNEP and EY that concluded that major labels kept 73% of Spotify Premium payouts, while writers/publishers received 16%, and artists received 11%. Mike Masnick of Techdirt wrote: "Sure, in the past, it may have been reasonable for the labels to take on large fees for distribution, but that's when it meant manufacturing tons of plastic and vinyl, and then shipping it to thousands of record stores around the globe. In this case, there's no manufacturing, and distribution is an "upload" button."

==== Spotify's "artist-in-residence" aid ====
In February 2012, Forbes reported on "Spotify's secret weapon": musician D. A. Wallach, member of the band Chester French and former Harvard classmate of Mark Zuckerberg. He acts as Spotify's "artist-in-residence" and helps Spotify "brainstorm artist-friendly applications that can be carved from the gusher of data it collects". One such application includes geographical data of which cities listen to artists' music the most as suitable tour locations. He told Forbes:

We're working very carefully to make Spotify the most artist-friendly company that has ever existed. ... We're very interested in a high level of letting artists directly connect to their fans and manage that relationship and deliver value to their fans, and vice versa. We want to do that really elegantly, at a scale that's never existed before.

In a June interview with Hypebot, Wallach reported that $180 million of royalties was paid out in 2011 and 70% of Spotify's revenue consisted of royalty payments. Spotify's growth meant that the per-stream royalty rate doubled between the service's inception and mid-2012. He said that, at the time, compared to iTunes, the average listener spends $60 annually on music, whereas Spotify Premium users spend twice that amount. According to Wallach in 2012: "The growth of the platform is proportional to the royalty pay out, and since inception, we've already doubled the effective per play rate."

==== Artist withdrawals ====
===== Thom Yorke =====
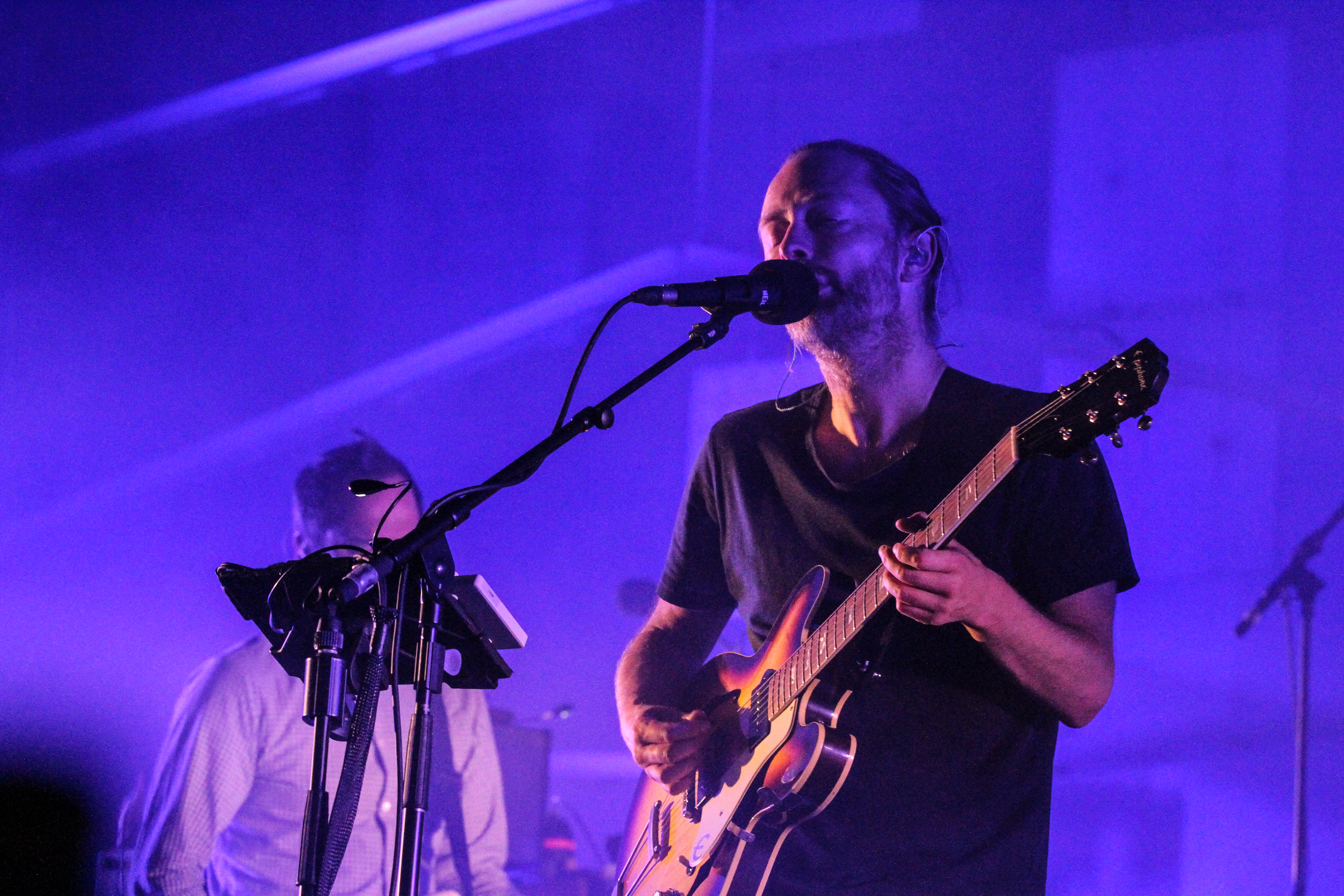
Radiohead singer Thom Yorke (front) and producer Nigel Godrich (rear) have accused Spotify of not supporting new artists fairly.

In July 2013, the Radiohead singer Thom Yorke and the producer Nigel Godrich removed their band Atoms for Peace and Yorke's solo music from Spotify. In a tweet, Yorke stated: "Make no mistake—new artists you discover on #Spotify will not get paid. Meanwhile, shareholders will shortly be rolling in it. Simples." Godrich stated: "[Streaming] cannot work as a way of supporting new artists' work. Spotify and the like either have to address that fact and change the model for new releases, or else all new music producers should be bold and vote with their feet."

In an October 2013 interview with Mexican website Sopitas, Yorke said: "I feel like as musicians, we need to fight the Spotify thing. I feel that, in some ways, what's happening in the mainstream is the last gasp of the old industry. Once that does finally die, which it will, something else will happen." He described Spotify as "the last desperate fart of a dying corpse". Spotify responded in a statement that it was "still in the early stages of a long-term project that's already having a hugely positive effect on artists and new music", and that it is "100% committed to making Spotify the most artist-friendly music service possible, and are constantly talking to artists and managers about how Spotify can help build their career". In 2015, Brian Message, a partner at Radiohead's management company Courtyard Management, said he disagreed with Yorke, noting that Spotify pays 70 percent of its revenue back to the music industry. He said that "Thom's issue was that the pipe has become so jammed ... We encourage all of our artists to take a long-term approach ... Plan for the long term, understand that it's a tough game."

On 17 June 2016, Radiohead's ninth album, A Moon Shaped Pool, was made available on Spotify, six weeks after it was released on paid-for streaming services including Apple Music and Tidal and Deezer. Spotify had been in "advanced discussions" with Radiohead's management and label to make A Moon Shaped Pool the first album available exclusively to Spotify's paid subscribers, but no agreement was reached. The Spotify spokesperson Jonathan Prince stated: "Some of the approaches we explored with Radiohead were new, and we ultimately decided that we couldn't deliver on those approaches technologically in time for the album's release schedule." In Rainbows, the only other Radiohead album not previously available on Spotify, was added on 10 June 2016. Yorke's solo albums and Atoms for Peace were re-added in December 2017.

===== Taylor Swift =====
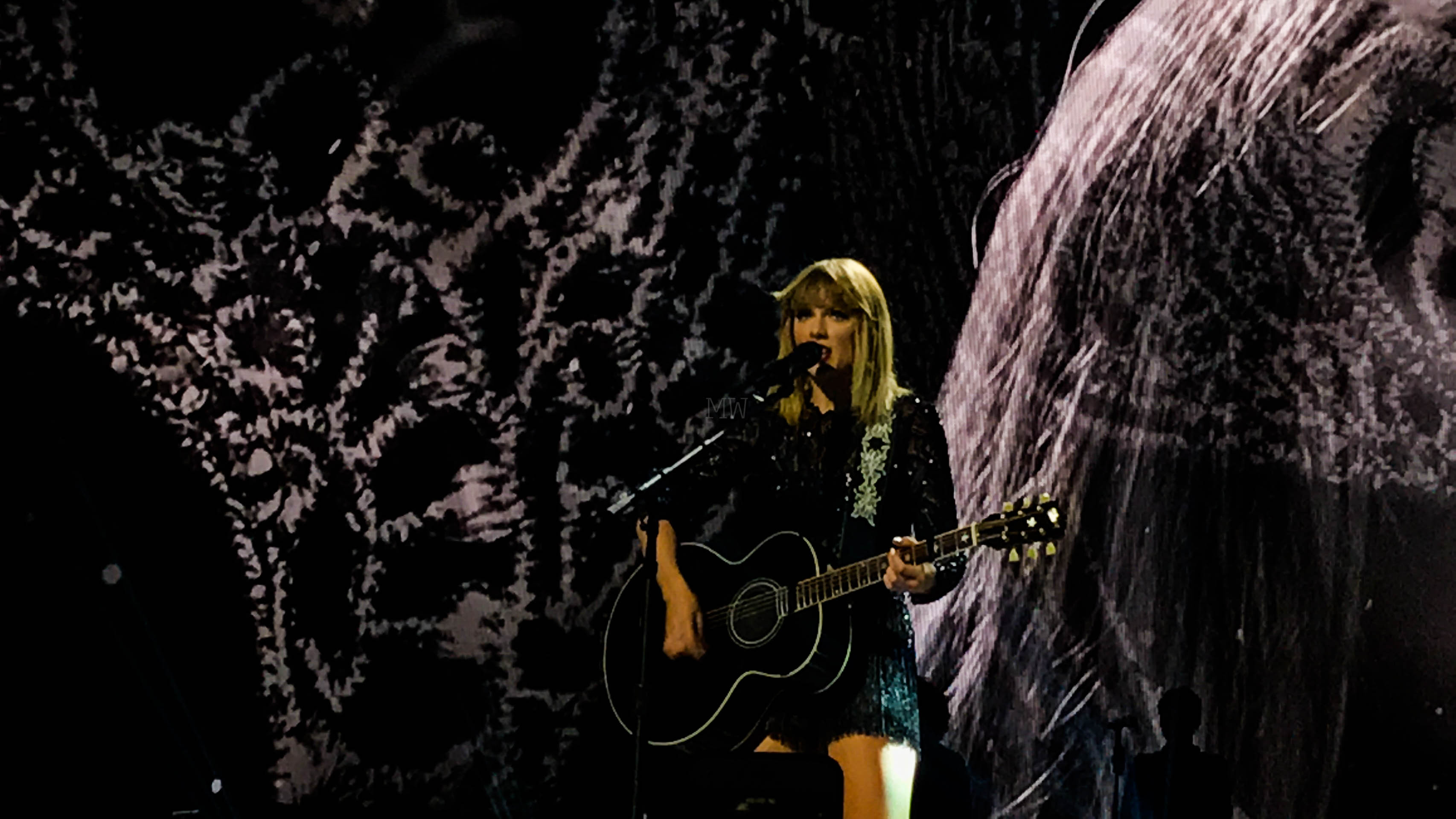
Taylor Swift, pictured in 2017, temporarily removed her music from Spotify.

In July 2014, the American singer-songwriter Taylor Swift wrote an article in The Wall Street Journal in which she stated:

Music is art, and art is important and rare. Important, rare things are valuable. Valuable things should be paid for. It's my opinion that music should not be free, and my prediction is that individual artists and their labels will someday decide what an album's price point is. I hope they don't underestimate themselves or undervalue their art.

On 3 November 2014, Swift removed her discography from Spotify. Swift had previously delayed the streaming of her 2012 album Red. Swift stated: "I'm not willing to contribute my life's work to an experiment that I don't feel fairly compensates the writers, producers, artists, and creators of this music. And I just don't agree with perpetuating the perception that music has no value and should be free."

Spotify launched a social media campaign to persuade Swift to return and, in a statement on its website, claimed that nearly 16 million of over 40 million users had played her music in the preceding 30-day period. Spotify CEO Daniel Ek wrote: "Taylor Swift is absolutely right; music is art, art has real value, and artists deserve to be paid for it. ... At our current size, payouts for a top artist like Taylor Swift (before she pulled her catalog) are on track to exceed $6 million a year." However, Scott Borchetta, CEO of Big Machine Records (Swift's label at the time), disputed those figures, and claimed that Swift had received "less than $500,000" in the past 12 months of domestic streaming of her songs. A Spotify spokesperson disputed this, telling Time that the total payout for Swift's streaming was $2 million globally.

According to Ben Popper of The Verge, Borchetta's figure of $500,000 only covered Spotify's payment for Taylor Swift streams in the US, which is not its largest market. Regarding the $6 million figure, Popper wrote: "As more people sign up for Spotify and Taylor Swift continues her march towards infinite popularity, the amount she is getting paid is increasing. [Ek] took her trend line and ran it forward a year to get to the highest possible number he could quote."

According to Borchetta, the amount Swift earned from streaming her videos on Vevo was greater than the payout she received from Spotify. He told Time: "The facts show that the music industry was much better off before Spotify hit these shores ... Don't forget this is for the most successful artist in music today. What about the rest of the artists out there struggling to make a career? Over the last year, what Spotify has paid is the equivalent of less than 50,000 albums sold."

Borchetta said in a February 2015 interview that Swift's catalog would be permitted on a streaming service "that understands the different needs that we [Swift and Big Machine Records] have," whereby "the choice to be [on the free, ad-supported tier] or not" is provided. Borchetta argued that Swift's musical oeuvre is "arguably the most important current catalog there is", and stated that the streaming issue is "about each individual artist, and the real mission here is to bring ... attention to it." In November 2014, Borchetta stated in a radio interview that "If this fan went and purchased the record, CD, iTunes, wherever, and then their friends go, 'Why did you pay for it? It's free on Spotify', we're being completely disrespectful to that superfan."

In December 2015, a bootleg release of Swift's song, "I Knew You Were Trouble", appeared on Spotify credited to Welsh rock band Lostprophets. The release was removed three days later.

In an interview with Music Week in November 2016, Spotify's UK head of content programming George Ergatoudis said: "I've got every reason to be very optimistic Taylor Swift will be coming back to Spotify. I'm not saying it's done, but the indications are good, put it like that".

Swift collaborated with Zayn Malik for the song "I Don't Wanna Live Forever" for the movie Fifty Shades Darker. The song, released in December 2016, was withheld from Spotify for one week after its original release on competing streaming services.

In June 2017, it was announced that Swift's full catalog would be released on all streaming services, including Spotify. On social media, Swift's management team stated: "In celebration of 1989 selling over 10 million albums worldwide and the RIAA's 100 million song certification, Taylor wants to thank her fans by making her entire back catalog available to all streaming services." Rolling Stone questioned whether the move to allow her music on all streaming services was permanent. On 25 August 2017, Swift released her single "Look What You Made Me Do"; it was made available on Spotify immediately following release. However, her sixth studio album, Reputation, featuring "Look What You Made Me Do", was withheld from all streaming services after its 10 November release date, not being made available for streaming until 1 December 2017. All releases by Swift since have been released to Spotify immediately.

==== Content withdrawals and delays ====
Spotify states in its support pages that: "We want all the world's music on Spotify. However, some artists and tracks are not currently available. Sometimes agreements can't be reached with the artist or label, or a change may happen in music ownership." Furthermore, in its apps, Spotify states a message for unavailable content: "The artist or their representatives have decided not to release this album on Spotify. We are working on it and hope they will change their mind soon."

In December 2015, Coldplay withheld A Head Full of Dreams from Spotify until one week after its release, citing that all music on Spotify is available to both paid and free users. Coldplay previously delayed their album Ghost Stories from all streaming services for four months after CD, vinyl and download release, and did the same with its earlier album Mylo Xyloto.

Beyoncé's self-titled album was not available until 24 November 2014, nearly a year after its original release. Adele's 21 was not initially available on Spotify, as Adele wanted Spotify to make her album available to paid subscribers only, but not to free users. Spotify declined her offer to avoid creating separate catalogues for subscribers and non-subscribers. The album, originally released in January 2011, became available to stream 17 months later in June 2012. In November 2015, the singer confirmed that her new album, 25, wouldn't be available for streaming on any service. In a series of interviews with Time, Adele stated: "I know that streaming music is the future, but it's not the only way to consume music. ... I can't pledge allegiance to something that I don't know how I feel about yet." However, the album was made available for streaming seven months later, in June 2016.

Several bands from the 1960s and 1970s delayed their work being made available on Spotify or any streaming services. Until the end of 2013, Led Zeppelin's music was not available, before the parties reached an agreement in December. In 2015, AC/DC and The Beatles allowed their music on streaming services. In 2018, many songs from the album Get Happy!! by Elvis Costello and the Attractions were removed from the site, including "New Amsterdam" and many others.

Icelandic singer Björk initially chose not to release her album Vulnicura on Spotify, saying: "This streaming thing just does not feel right. I don't know why, but it just seems insane. ... To work on something for two or three years and then just, 'Oh, here it is for free.' It's not about the money; it's about respect, you know? Respect for the craft and the amount of work you put into it."

In February 2017, Prince's music produced under the Warner Bros. label, including the albums 1999, Purple Rain, Dirty Mind, and Sign o' the Times, became available on Spotify and other streaming services.

In April 2017, rapper Jay Z, part-owner of streaming service Tidal, pulled his music catalog from Spotify and Apple Music. This was the third time the artist removed his albums from competing services, following the release of his debut album Reasonable Doubt, and later The Blueprint. On 4 December 2019, Jay Z's entire catalogue returned to Spotify after a two-year absence in honour of his 50th birthday.

In February 2019, Spotify premiered in India without the catalogue of Warner Music Group and its publishing division Warner/Chappell Music. Warner Music sued Spotify for using a statutory license, which applied to radio stations. In January 2020, Spotify signed a global publishing deal with Warner/Chappell. On 1 April 2020, Warner Music and Spotify ended the dispute by signing a global deal for the company's recording artists.

On 2 August 2019, progressive metal band Tool's catalog premiered on Spotify and other digital services for the first time.

In January 2021, Spotify removed nearly 750,000 tracks from its catalogue for having fraudulent stream totals. Distributor DistroKid has offered a counter-notification process for artists whose music was removed from Spotify.

On 1 March 2021, due to the expiring distribution deal, K-pop songs and releases distributed by Kakao M were removed from Spotify. According to the statement released by Kakao M, Spotify were claimed as the party who chose not to renew the deal. On 11 March 2021, Kakao M renewed its distribution deal with Spotify.

On 5 August 2021, Blackground Records partnered with Empire Distribution to re-release most of its discography, most notably the catalogue of R&B singer Aaliyah. On 20 August 2021, Aaliyah's second album, One in a Million, debuted on Spotify. Before 2021, all of Aaliyah's Blackground albums (except for her 1994 debut album Age Ain't Nothing but a Number) had never been released digitally because her uncle/manager, Barry Hankerson, had let those releases go out of print.

In December 2021, Spotify removed albums by hundreds of comedians because of unpaid composition royalties. The comedians are represented by Spoken Giants, an administration company for spoken-word compositions.

On January 3, 2023, after years of negotiations with Tommy Boy Records, American hip-hop group De La Soul announced that their first six albums would make their digital debut on March 3, 2023. The first single, "The Magic Number", was released on January 13, 2023.

Garth Brooks and Joanna Newsom are some of the few major artists still missing from Spotify. Brooks has an exclusive deal with Amazon Music, while Newsom's main catalogue is not available on Spotify. She said that the streaming platform is "the banana of the music industry" and calls it "the villainous cabal of major labels". The only song available on Spotify by Newsom is her cover of The Muppet Show's theme song, from the soundtrack of the 2011 film The Muppets.

On July 25, 2025, Australian band King Gizzard and the Lizard Wizard removed their catalog from Spotify. The band posted on Instagram: "New demos collection out everywhere except Spotify (fuck Spotify). You can bootleg it if you wanna."

In August 2025, Canadian post-rock band Godspeed You! Black Emperor removed their entire discography from major streaming services, including Spotify. Their two albums released through Kranky—F♯ A♯ ∞ (1998) and Lift Your Skinny Fists Like Antennas to Heaven (2000)—remained temporarily available on Apple Music but were scheduled for removal. A representative for Kranky stated that the label allows artists to determine how their music is distributed. The band's catalog continued to be available for purchase and streaming through Bandcamp. The decision followed similar actions taken by Deerhoof, Xiu Xiu, and King Gizzard & the Lizard Wizard, who had withdrawn their music from Spotify earlier in 2025. Those groups cited concerns regarding investments made by Spotify chief executive officer Daniel Ek through his fund Prima Materia, which has financed Helsing, a defense company developing artificial intelligence software for military applications.

In January 2026, Mexican rock band Café Tacuba removed their entire discography from Spotify. Frontman Rubén Albarrán wrote letters to Warner Music and Universal Music México to remove the band's music from Stupidfy [sic] because the streaming service "contradicts our artistic vision and our personal and band ethics".

=== Controversial policies and alleged behaviors ===
==== 2015 privacy policy ambiguity ====
In August 2015, Spotify changed its terms and privacy policy, expanding Spotify's lawful access to media and location data stored on user devices. Initial concerns were raised about the policy being "far too broad without examples or vital context and detail around the data gathering the service is implementing", something Ek ascribed to poor communication from Spotify about the implications of the policy change. The Verge has criticised Wired's coverage (which was republished by Gizmodo) to the policy change, citing a lack of context in their reporting in terms of failing to mention opt-out and explicit consent clauses, describing it as an "overreaction", as "FUD (Fear, Uncertainty, and Doubt)", and fearmongering.

In response to concerns about the change, Ek tweeted a list of specific scenarios when this data is needed. For example, he described that access to photos is needed to upload playlist covers, and contacts for sharing tracks. Later, Ek published a post on the Spotify blog explicitly listing out the times when Spotify may ask to access this data, apologising for poor communication, and reiterating a "100 percent commit[ment] to protecting" user privacy.

Wired has since removed its coverage of the policy change.

==== Pay for Play practice and "Discovery Mode" ====
In August 2015, Billboard reported that Spotify was among the streaming services influenced by "pay for play", in which labels pay for songs to be placed on popular playlists followed by many users. Daniel Glass, executive of Glassnote Records, stated that playlist promotion was "a very, very big deal". Billboard referenced an 5 August practice, in which Universal Music Group hired Jay Frank as its Senior Vice President of Global Streaming Marketing, followed by an investment in Frank's marketing firm DigMark, "an innovator" in pay-for-play practices that charges clients US$2,000 for a six-week campaign. The price goes up for playlists followed by more users, up to US$10,000. "For a while, Spotify didn't take a view" on the practice, according to a music label executive, but its then-new Terms of Service agreements would "[take] a stand against commercializing accounts and playlists by rank-and-file users", as well as prohibit the practice of "accepting any compensation, financial or otherwise, to influence ... the content included on an account or playlist". However, Billboard wrote that "policing, let alone enforcing, these terms could be difficult", adding that loopholes can still be exploited to continue the practice.

In June 2018, allegations resurfaced after the release of Drake's Scorpion. According to users, the rapper's songs were included in various playlists, some that were unrelated to the genre of their songs, such as gospel, ambient music and "best of British" (Drake is from Canada, not Britain). Heavy criticism followed, with reports of some paying Spotify subscribers demanding refunds or unsubscribing. One of them reported to call the Federal Trade Commission to report advertising fraud.

==== 2016–17: "Fake artists" controversy ====
In August 2016, Music Business Worldwide reported that Spotify had begun paying producers to create music and placing the tracks on highly followed and popular playlists on the service. The production of the music, reportedly paid for by Spotify, was published on the service using fake artist names, and the motivation behind the practice reportedly due to creating tracks to "quality control" the mood of specific playlists and gain more favorable royalty rates than major and independent labels offer. However, the implications of the practice meant certain rightsholders who normally earned decent payouts from being featured on such playlists were excluded. After being mentioned in an article by Vulture in July 2017, a Spotify spokesperson told Billboard that "We do not and have never created 'fake' artists and put them on Spotify playlists. Categorically untrue, full stop [...] We pay royalties—sound and publishing—for all tracks on Spotify, and for everything we playlist. We do not own rights, we're not a label, all our music is licensed from rightsholders and we pay them—we don't pay ourselves". However, in another report, the Music Business Worldwide publication discussed the situation, including the artists' lack of social media profiles, lack of managers, lawyers and industry relationships, the listing of owning all their own rights, the lack of appearance on other streaming services, Spotify's denial to comment regarding questions of the artists' frequent placement on playlists, royalty rates and recommendation origins, and anonymous comments from "very senior figures in the music business" with alleged knowledge of the practice. The publication listed 50 of the top artists under suspicion, and asked them to contact the publication to verify their authenticity, adding that "We're pretty sure A&R teams from across the globe would love to hear about artists with no online presence who have managed to rack up millions of Spotify plays with their first few tracks".

==== 2017–18: Hate Content & Hateful Conduct policy ====
In August 2017, Spotify announced that it would remove music that promotes white nationalism from its catalogue.

In May 2018, Spotify attracted criticism for its "Hate Content & Hateful Conduct policy" that removed the music of R. Kelly, Tay-K and XXXTentacion from its editorial and algorithmic playlists. A spokesperson for Spotify stated, "when we look at promotion, we look at issues around hateful conduct, where you have an artist or another creator who has done something off-platform that is so particularly out of line with our values, egregious, in a way that it becomes something that we don't want to associate ourselves with." R. Kelly has faced accusations of sexual abuse and misconduct since the 1990s, and was later found guilty of multiple counts relating to child sexual abuse and sex trafficking in 2021. Tay-K was arrested for second-degree murder in 2016 and was found guilty in 2019, and had additionally been arrested for capital murder in 2017, but was acquitted in April of 2025. Before XXXTentacion's murder, he was awaiting trial for multiple domestic violence-related charges.

The decision to remove XXXTentacion from playlisting was criticized, with many pointing out that R. Kelly and Tay-K's crimes of sexual abuse and murder were far more serious than the allegations levied against XXXTentacion. Additionally, XXXTentacion and his team responded criticizing the decision, adding that artists such as Ozzy Osbourne, Dr. Dre, David Bowie, and Michael Jackson were not being censored despite more severe allegations being levied against them than the ones brought against XXXTentacion. The decision to remove XXXTentacion's music from curated playlists was reversed after Top Dawg Entertainment CEO Anthony Tiffith threatened to remove his label's music from the service, with Top Dawg artist Kendrick Lamar additionally threatening to remove his entire discography from the service if XXXTentacion's music was not reinstated into Spotify programming. Spotify eventually relented, and the decision to remove XXXTentacion's music specifically was revoked in June because the company deemed the original wording to be too "vague". Spotify moved to reduce the impact of artists' conduct on their inclusion and promotion on the platform, saying that it isn't the company's purpose to regulate behaviour. R. Kelly and Tay-K's music, however, remained removed from programming.

==== Removal of podcast content ====
In April 2021, Spotify announced the removal of 42 The Joe Rogan Experience episodes from their catalog including interviews with Alex Jones, Bulletproof Coffee founder Dave Asprey expressing anti-aging claims of his product, crude jokes, and interviews with Chris D'Elia. In May 2020, Spotify paid an estimated $100 million for the exclusive rights to the podcast library.

==== Playlist fiddling and partnerships with low-royalty production companies ====
Since about 2021 Spotify was filling its playlists in some genres (including jazz, chill and "peaceful piano") with stock music attributed to a handful of little-known musicians, mostly Swedish, in an effort to reduce its royalty payouts. In 2022, an investigation by the Swedish daily Dagens Nyheter found that around twenty songwriters were behind the work of more than five hundred "artists," and that thousands of their tracks were on Spotify and had been streamed millions of times. Writing for Harper's Magazine, journalist Liz Pelly discovered that Spotify has partnerships with a web of production companies which give up control of some royalty payments so that the company can benefit financially. These tracks are then seeded across the platform on playlists called Perfect Fit Content (PFC). In doing so, they are effectively reducing the number of plays for other musicians.

==== ICE recruitment ads ====
In October 2025, Spotify was criticized for running recruitment advertisements for ICE after receiving $74,000 from the Department of Homeland Security.

In January 2026, Spotify confirmed ICE ads are no longer running on their platform after the government advertising campaign ended. Later that month, the advocacy group Indivisible sent a public letter to Spotify's new CEOs calling on the company to pledge to stop running ICE ads going forward.

== Security issues ==
=== 2009 security breach ===
In March 2009, Spotify warned users that a security flaw discovered and fixed in December 2008 was more serious than previously thought, having compromised the password hashes of individual users in Spotify's pre-December 2008 customer base, as well as potentially "registration information such as your email address, birth date, gender, postal code and billing receipt details". Credit card information was not exposed, due to being handled by a secure third-party provider. Spotify advised users to change their passwords, especially in cases where the same password was used for multiple sites.

=== 2011 PC malware reports ===
In March 2011, Spotify temporarily removed display advertising on its computer software, after reports from users on the free service tier that a malicious advertisement had infected their systems. Then-named security firm Websense stated that the attack used the Blackhole exploit kit. Spotify said in a statement that "Users with anti-virus software will have been protected", and "We sincerely apologise to any users affected. We'll continue working hard to ensure this does not happen again and that our users enjoy Spotify securely and in confidence."

=== 2014 security breach ===
In May 2014, Spotify announced it had been hacked, but stated that only one user's information was accessed. It released a new Spotify app on the Android platform, replacing the former app, with Spotify chief technology officer Oskar Stål writing in a blog post that the upgrade was "a necessary precaution" and that no action for apps on other platforms were necessary.

== Missing or inadequate application features ==
=== Lack of explicit content filter ===
Spotify is one of the few music streaming services that do not allow users to filter explicit content, which Rick Broida of CNET writes "may prevent users from opting into Spotify's Family Plan subscription offering". However, in April 2018, Spotify added the explicit filter for lyrics to mobile and tablet versions, but still displays explicit album art to all users. As of 2021, there is a setting for explicit music for Windows.

=== Limit on music library ===
Spotify used to limit users' music libraries to 10,000 songs. This caused negative publicity on several occasions and "years of user complaints". Derek Mead of Motherboard wrote in March 2016 that the limit was "insane", and suggested that Spotify, after raising "another billion dollars" in funding, should "fix the service's most asinine limitation". Chris Welch of The Verge wrote in May 2017 that "It's time for Spotify to stop capping how much music you can save", further questioning "Why is there such an arbitrary cap?" Welch's article also highlighted the "thousands of votes from users" on Spotify's community forum asking for a higher limit, and attached a reply from a company representative, stating "At the moment, we don't have plans to extend the "Your Music" limit. The reason is because less [sic] than 1% of users reach it. The current limit ensures a great experience for 99% of users instead of an "OK" experience for 100%".

On 26 May 2020, Spotify relented on their decision and decided to not limit user music libraries to 10,000 songs and albums. The new system only applies to the ability to save songs and albums to user's Spotify library. Individual playlists are still limited to 10,000 songs, and users can still only download up to 10,000 songs on each of their five different devices for offline listening.

== Other criticism ==
=== "Scorpion SZN" promotion ===
On 27 June 2018, Spotify held a "takeover" promotion (dubbed "Scorpion SZN") to promote the release of Drake's fifth studio album Scorpion. During the promotion, many of the service's curated playlists had their cover art modified to include photos of Drake, even if the playlist's topic was not associated with Drake's music. The campaign faced criticism from some users, who felt that it was excessive (especially to users not necessarily interested in Drake's music), and contradictory to Spotify Premium being promoted as an ad-free service. It was reported that some users had successfully received refunds after complaining about the promotion.

=== Ministry of Sound copyright lawsuit ===
In September 2013, Ministry of Sound sued Spotify, alleging that user playlists mimicking the track listings of their compilation albums were infringing on the copyrights of the albums themselves. Although Ministry of Sound do not own the tracks in their compilation albums, they could claim copyright in their curation, or the selection and arrangement of tracks. However, Spotify only pays rights holders for individual tracks, not compilations.

In February 2014, the two parties reached a settlement, under which Spotify agreed to restrict the ability to search for or follow the allegedly infringing playlists.

=== Misinformation and The Joe Rogan Experience ===
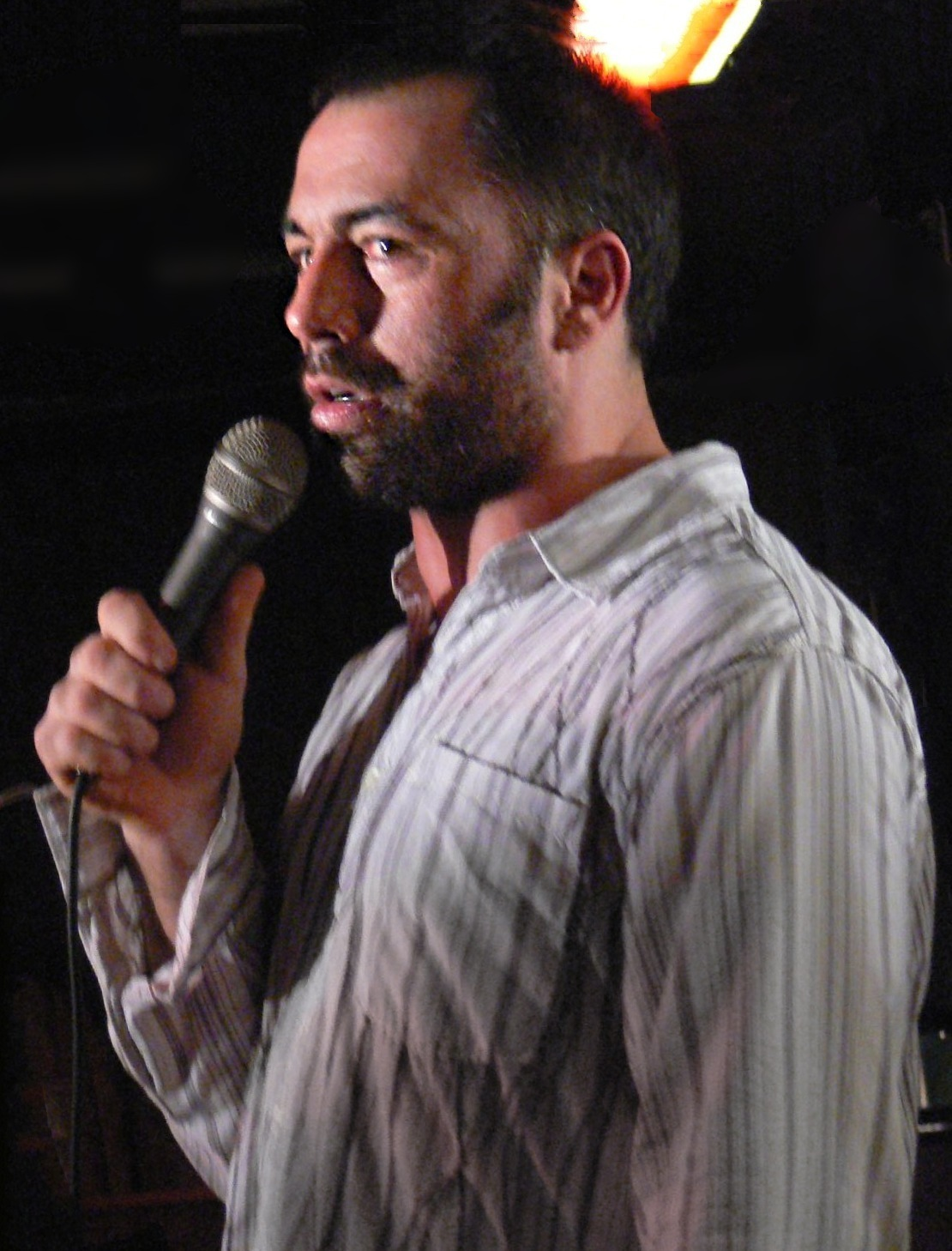
Joe Rogan, host of The Joe Rogan Experience

In 2020, Spotify received criticism from anti-misinformation groups when conspiracy theorist Alex Jones appeared on Joe Rogan's podcast, The Joe Rogan Experience. Spotify's employees raised concerns about Jones' appearance on the show. In 2021, Spotify removed 42 episodes of Rogan's podcast.

In January 2022, 270 scientists, physicians, professors, doctors, and healthcare workers wrote an open letter to Spotify expressing concern over "false and societally harmful assertions" on The Joe Rogan Experience and asked Spotify to "establish a clear and public policy to moderate misinformation on its platform". The 270 signatories objected to Rogan broadcasting COVID-19 misinformation, citing "a highly controversial" episode featuring guest Robert Malone (#1757). The episode has been criticized for "promoting baseless conspiracy theories", including "an unfounded theory that societal leaders have 'hypnotized' the public." The signatories assert: "Dr. Malone is one of two recent JRE guests who has compared pandemic policies to the Holocaust. These actions are not only objectionable and offensive, but also medically and culturally dangerous." The signatories also note that Malone was suspended from Twitter for spreading misinformation about COVID-19.

On 26 January 2022, Neil Young removed his music from Spotify after they refused to remove the podcast. Joni Mitchell subsequently removed her music in support of Young. Other artists and podcasters, such as Nils Lofgren, Brené Brown and Crosby, Stills, & Nash, also announced a boycott of Spotify. Prince Harry and Meghan, Duchess of Sussex, who signed a multi-year partnership with Spotify, said that since April 2021 they had been "expressing concerns" over COVID-19 misinformation on the platform.

Amid the controversy, as of 28 January 2022 Spotify's stock had fallen 12% week-on-week, a loss of $4 billion in market capitalization. By 30 January 2022, this number had grown to a loss of $6.7 billion in market value, a fall of 17% week-on-week, and a fall of 26% year-to-date. Spotify's stock fell by 13% after the company reported fourth-quarter earnings on 2 February 2022. Although Ek addressed the Rogan controversy during the earnings call, the loss in value was attributed to the company's guidance on Q1 user growth, which did not meet analyst expectations.

Spotify promised to add content advisories for anything containing discussions related to COVID-19 and posted additional rules. Rogan apologized for his role in the controversy, and defended his interviews with two controversial guests, Robert W. Malone and Peter A. McCullough, as "highly credentialed, very intelligent, very accomplished people, and they have an opinion that is different from the mainstream narrative". Rogan said he agreed with Spotify's plan to label episodes including COVID-19 discussions and would try to "have more experts with differing opinions, right after the controversial ones".

In February 2022, Spotify removed about 70 more episodes of The Joe Rogan Experience, reportedly at Rogan's own request. Musician India Arie shared a compilation of clips in which Rogan used the "n word" on the podcast, and a clip in which Rogan appears to liken being around black people with the film Planet of the Apes. Arie announced that she was also boycotting Spotify. Rogan posted an apology, saying it was "regretful and shameful", but said that the clips were "taken out of context". In a message to employees, Ek said: "While I strongly condemn what Joe has said and I agree with his decision to remove past episodes from our platform, I realize some will want more. And I want to make one point very clear – I do not believe that silencing Joe is the answer."

In July 2022, Crosby, Stills & Nash returned to the platform, although the group's songs with Neil Young were not brought back. The group stated that streaming profits from the newly returned songs will be donated to charities supporting those affected by COVID-19 for "at least a month".

In March 2024, after a two-year absence from the platform, Neil Young announced that his music would return to Spotify, starting with his greatest hits album. Later that month, Joni Mitchell restored her catalogue to Spotify.

=== Funding defense technology ===
In November 2021, Prima Materia, an investment company cofounded by Ek and Spotify investor Shakil Khan, was announced as the lead investor in a €100 million fundraising round for Helsing, a European defense company that develops military strike drones and AI systems. Ek also joined Helsing's board along with its co-founders Torsten Reil, Gundbert Scherf and Niklas Köhler. In 2025, Ek's firm increased its investment in Helsing, leading a €600 million funding round in the company that valued it at €12 billion.

Several artists have objected to Ek's investments in defense technology. The German DJ and techno producer Skee Mask urged his nearly 17,000 Twitter followers not to give their "last penny to such a wealthy business that obviously prefers the development of warfare instead of actual progression in the music business." According to Sameer Gupta, a percussionist based in Brooklyn, New York, "All that money that's being taken from artists and musicians is being funneled to this," referring to Helsing. "I don't know a single musician who would ever say, 'That's the function of music.'" In 2025, the bands Deerhoof, Xiu Xiu, King Gizzard & the Lizard Wizard, Godspeed You! Black Emperor, Hotline TNT, Massive Attack, and Sylvan Esso removed their music from the streaming service over objections to Ek's investment in Helsing.
