= Julie Buntin =

Buntin at the 2017 Texas Book Festival.

Julie Buntin is an American writer, editor, and professor. She was short listed for the John Leonard Prize.

== Biography ==
Buntin received an MFA in creative writing from New York University. In 2019, she won the Ellen Levine Fund for Writers Award for a novel-in-progress. She is an Assistant Professor at the University of Michigan’s Helen Zell Writers’ Program.

Buntin was a fellow at Bread Loaf Writers' Conference and has twice been a fellow at MacDowell (artists' residency and workshop). She was an editor and the director of writing programs at Catapult, where she worked with authors including Nicole Chung, Taylor Harris, Amy Kurzweil, and Courtney Maum.

== Marlena ==
Her first novel, Marlena, was published in April 2017 by Henry Holt and Company. Notes to New Mothers, an anthology, co-edited by Buntin and Rebecca Knight was published in 2026 by W. W. Norton & Company.

Marlena was a National Book Critics Circle John Leonard Prize Finalist, and it was named a Best Book of the Year by BuzzFeed, The Washington Post, Esquire, Harper’s Bazaar, NPR, NYLON, Huffington Post, and Barnes and Noble. The novel was named an Indie Next Pickand a Barnes and Noble Discover Pick. It was chosen for the Belletrist Book Club and Book of the Month. Prior to publication, the book received starred reviews from industry magazines Kirkus Reviews, Publishers Weekly, and Booklist. In 2018, Marlena was named a Michigan Notable Book by the Library of Michigan and was selected by the Nevada Humanities for the Nevada Reads statewide book club.

== Works ==
- Buntin, Julie (April 4, 2017). Marlena. Henry Holt and Company. ISBN 978-1627797641.
- Buntin, Julie (July 14, 2026). Famous Men. New York: Random House. ISBN 978-0-593-22995-8. OCLC 1601681782.
- Rebecca Knight; Julie Buntin, eds. (September 1, 2026). Notes to New Mothers. W. W. Norton & Company. ISBN 978-1324117056.
