= Sienna Rose =

Likely AI-generated singer

- Developer: Anonymous
- Year introduced: 2025
- Type: Singer
- Language/s: English

Sienna Rose is a musical act who, after becoming popular on streaming services such as Spotify in early 2026, gained attention for likely being AI-generated.

== History ==
Rose's first release was a six-song extended play (EP) released in September 2025. Between September and December of 2025, Rose uploaded at least 45 songs and ten albums to streaming services, originally as a white and redheaded singer-songwriter and later as a brunette and as a black female R&B singer. Following the success of the R&B music, the other two versions were removed from most streaming services. Poppy Burton of NME described the frequency of her releases as "implausible". For Rolling Stone, Maya Georgi compared the "lush vocals" and "delicate pianos" of her music to the songs of singers Olivia Dean and Alicia Keys.

In January 2026, Rose's Spotify bio described her as an anonymous neo-soul singer. By then, she had more than three million monthly listeners on the service and three of her songs—"Into the Blue", "Where Your Warmth Begins", and "Safe With You"—appeared on its Viral 50 — USA chart, with her top song, "Into the Blue", having received more than five million streams. However, she had little to no social media presence. Her music also garnered attention on TikTok, where an account purported to be Rose herself regularly uploaded videos. However, by then, her social media pages were not verified, she had never performed live, and had not responded to any requests for an interview. That month, Selena Gomez used Rose's song "Where Your Warmth Begins" in an Instagram post about the 83rd Golden Globe Awards, which brought wider attention to the artist and prompted discussions over whether or not she had been created using generative AI. Gomez later removed the song from the post.

French streaming service Deezer reported that many of her songs were flagged as AI-generated by their AI detection tools based on mathematical patterns in her music and stated that they were "certain" that Rose was AI-generated. Deezer also displayed a tag on her album Honey on the Money, which featured the "AI-enhanced" reggae artist Let Babylon Burn, indicating that it was AI-generated. TikTok users soon uploaded videos expressing their disappointment that Rose was likely AI-generated and commenting that Rose's videos on the platform had likely also been AI-generated, pointing to her hair moving unnaturally, her teeth morphing together, and fake numbers appearing on her clothing, among other signs.

English composer Michael Price criticized Rose as "sickening" and "one of the most striking examples of those listening to music every day who trust that what is being curated by streaming services is made by real musicians", while former Spotify data engineer Glenn McDonald stated that Rose "represents much more" than "just one AI artist" due to "being promoted in the same space as real music". Georgi described Rose and the AI-generated band the Velvet Sundown as "proof that AI musicians are running rampant" on Spotify, while Stereogum's Margaret Farrell wrote that Rose showed that Spotify was not "doing a great job" with their stated goal of "cleaning up AI slop". James Pero of Gizmodo described Rose as "evidence that [Spotify] might not be able to identify which [AI-generated] music to take down in the first place".

== See also ==
- Artificial intelligence in music
- Controversy over fake artists on Spotify
