= The Yellow House (book) =

2019 memoir by Sarah M. Broom

- First edition cover
- Author: Sarah M. Broom
- Audio read by: Sarah M. Broom
- Cover artist: Alison Forner
- Language: English
- Subject: Memoir
- Publisher: Grove Press
- Publication date: August 13, 2019
- Publication place: United States
- Media type: Print (hardcover and paperback), e-book, audiobook
- Pages: 384
- Awards: National Book Award for Nonfiction (2019)
- ISBN: 978-0-8021-2508-8 (hardcover)
- Dewey Decimal: 814/.6 B
- LC Class: PS3602.R6458 Y45 2019

The Yellow House is a memoir by Sarah M. Broom. It is Broom's first book and it was published on August 13, 2019, by Grove Press. The Yellow House chronicles Broom's family (mapping back approximately 100 years), her life growing up in New Orleans East, and the eventual demise of her beloved childhood home after Hurricane Katrina. Broom also focuses on the aftermath of Katrina and how the disaster altered her family and her neighborhood. At its core, the book examines race, class, politics, family, trauma, and inequality in New Orleans and America. The Yellow House won the 2019 National Book Award for Nonfiction.

== Publication ==
The Yellow House was published by Grove Press on August 13, 2019, following the publication of an early excerpt in the New Yorker in 2015. The book debuted at number 11 on the Hardcover Nonfiction best sellers list for the September 1, 2019, edition of The New York Times.

== Reception ==
In a pre-publication review, Dwight Garner of the New York Times wrote, "This is a major book that I suspect will come to be considered among the essential memoirs of this vexing decade." In the New York Times Book Review, Angela Flournoy called it “an instantly essential text.” The Star Tribune opined that Broom's book had “essentially told the story of black America in one fell swoop.” Other publications to declare the book's importance included Publishers Weekly. and Kirkus Reviews Quoting the book itself, Kirkus Reviews opined that The Yellow House reflected the author's attempt "to reckon with 'the psychic cost of defining oneself by the place where you are from,'" adding that "Broom's lyrical style celebrates her family bonds, but a righteous fury runs throughout the narrative at New Orleans' injustices, from the foundation on up."

In November 2019, The Yellow House won the National Book Award for Nonfiction. The book was named one of the top 10 books of 2019 by both the New York Times Book Review and the Washington Post. The Yellow House won the John Leonard Award for Best First Book from the 2019 National Book Critics Circle Awards.
