= A Constellation of Vital Phenomena =

2013 novel by Anthony Marra

- First edition cover
- Author: Anthony Marra
- Language: English
- Subject: Second Chechen War
- Genre: Literary fiction, Historical fiction
- Publisher: Random House
- Publication date: May 7, 2013
- Media type: Print
- ISBN: 9780770436421

A Constellation of Vital Phenomena is a novel written by Anthony Marra, published May 7, 2013 by Random House. The book was a New York Times best seller and received positive critical reviews. The work has also been referenced in academic journals, including War, Literature & the Arts and The Lancet.

== Synopsis ==
The novel begins in 2004 during the Chechen War, with the abduction of Dokka, a villager accused of aiding Chechen rebels, by Russian soldiers. His eight-year-old daughter, Havaa, flees into the woods carrying a suitcase. She is discovered by Akhmed, a neighbor and unsuccessful village doctor, who resolves to protect her. Akhmed brings Havaa to a hospital in a nearby city, where only one doctor remains: Sonja, a gifted but overworked surgeon haunted by the disappearance of her sister, Natasha.

The narrative spans five days while using extensive flashbacks covering the previous decade. With shifting perspectives, the book uncovers the lives of its central figures as well as those of certain villagers, collaborators, soldiers, and refugees.

The title of the novel derives from a medical dictionary definition of life: “a constellation of vital phenomena—organization, irritability, movement, growth, reproduction, adaptation.” This phrase shows the book’s exploration of resilience and the persistence of humanity during conflict.

== Reception ==
A Constellation of Vital Phenomena received starred reviews from Library Journal, Publishers Weekly, and Booklist, as well as positive reviews from The New York Times Book Review, World Literature Today, Kirkus Reviews, Chicago Tribune, The Washington Post, NPR, San Francisco Chronicle, Shelf Awareness, The Economist, and Entertainment Weekly.

The New York Times and The Boston Globe provided mixed reviews.

=== Literary awards ===
Year	Award	Result	Ref.
2013	Barnes & Noble Discover Great New Writers Award, Fiction	Winner	
2013	Booklist Editors' Choice: Adult Books	Selection	
2013	California Book Award for First Fiction	Winner	
2013	Goodreads Choice Award for Fiction	Nominee	
2013	National Book Award for Fiction	Longlist	
2013	National Book Critics Circle Award, John Leonard Prize	Winner	
2013	New York Times Notable Book of the Year	Selection	
2013	Prix Medicis	Winner	
2014	Anisfield-Wolf Book Award for Fiction	Winner	
2014	Andrew Carnegie Medal for Excellence in Fiction	Longlist	
2014	Athens Prize for Literature - Περιοδικό (δέ)κατα	Winner	
2014	Carla Furstenberg Cohen Fiction Award	Winner	
2014	Dayton Literary Peace Prize for Fiction	Finalist	
2014	Indies Choice Book Award for Adult Debut	Winner	
2014	Notable Books	Selection	
2014	PEN/Robert W. Bingham Prize	Shortlist	
2014	Young Lions Fiction Award	Finalist	
2015	International Dublin Literary Award	Longlist	
