= Disappearing Earth =

2019 novel by Julia Phillips

- First edition cover
- Author: Julia Phillips
- Audio read by: Ilyana Kadushin
- Language: English
- Subject: Fiction
- Genre: Mystery, thriller
- Set in: Kamchatka Peninsula
- Publisher: Knopf
- Publication date: May 14, 2019
- Publication place: United States
- Media type: Print (Hardcover)
- Pages: 272
- ISBN: 978-0-525-52041-2
- Dewey Decimal: 813/.6
- LC Class: PS3616.H4585 D57 2019

Disappearing Earth is the 2019 debut novel by Julia Phillips.

== Plot ==
In an isolated town in Far Eastern part of Russia two young girls go missing.

== Critical reception ==
The New York Times Book Review described the book as a "superb debut...a novel in the form of overlapping short stories about the women who are affected both directly and indirectly by the kidnapping. The purpose of these stories is not to unite a community around a tragedy as a less daring and more conventional narrative would have it, but to expose the ways in which the women of Kamchatka are fragmented personally, culturally and emotionally not only by the crime that jump-starts the novel, but by place, identity and the people who try, and often fail, to understand them."

USA Today wrote, "It could be a frustrating book for readers who require propulsive plots and clean resolutions, as it offers neither. But Phillips is so skilled at conveying place and people, you can feel the chill of the shadow cast by Soviet-style apartment buildings, smell the blood soup, taste the burn of cheap vodka drunk too fast to numb the pain."

NPR said, "Disappearing Earth comes closer in spirit to great American literature than most of the fiction set within U.S. borders."

The book was named one of the top ten books of 2019 by The New York Times Book Review.

== Awards ==
Year	Award	Category	Result	Ref.
2019	Center for Fiction First Novel Prize	—	Shortlisted	
2019	Goodreads Choice Awards	Mystery & Thriller	Nominated—14th	
2019	National Book Award	Fiction	Finalist	
2019	National Book Critics Circle Award	John Leonard Prize	Finalist	
2020	Andrew Carnegie Medals for Excellence	Fiction	Longlisted	
2020	Young Lions Fiction Award	—	Finalist	
