= Elaine Scarry =

American academic

- Born: June 30, 1946 (age 80)
- Education: Chatham College; University of Connecticut
- Writing career
- Genres: Editor, Essays, Literary criticism
- Notable awards: Truman Capote Award for Literary Criticism

Elaine Scarry (born June 30, 1946) is an American essayist and professor of English and American Literature and Language. She is the Walter M. Cabot Professor of Aesthetics and the General Theory of Value at Harvard University. Her interests include Theory of Representation, the Language of Physical Pain, and Structure of Verbal and Material Making in Art, Science and the Law. She was formerly Professor of English at the University of Pennsylvania. She is a recipient of the Truman Capote Award for Literary Criticism.

== Life ==
She is the author of The Body in Pain which is known as a definitive study of pain and inflicting pain. She argues that physical pain leads to destruction and the unmaking of the human world, whereas human creation at the opposite end of the spectrum leads to the making of the world.

In 1998, she delivered the essay 'On Beauty and Being Just', for the Tanner Lectures on Human Values, an inquiry into the disparagement of beauty in western civilization in the twentieth century.

Her 1999 study, Dreaming by the Book won the Truman Capote Award for Literary Criticism.

In 2014, she published a book about nuclear weapons, Thermonuclear Monarchy, in which she 'explores the baleful political consequences of limiting the control of nuclear weapons to a select few, and the authority to launch them to even fewer – in the case of the United States, to the president alone in what amounts to his monarchical power.'

=== Hypotheses on plane crashes ===
In 1998, Elaine Scarry authored an article The Fall of TWA 800: The Possibility of Electromagnetic Interference which appeared in The New York Review of Books. The article's basic hypothesis – which does not enjoy support from most scientists or engineers – is that electromagnetic interference from a P-3 Orion aircraft may have been responsible for the center fuel tank explosion during that flight in 1996.

Scarry subsequently published another article hypothesizing that another plane crash, that of EgyptAir 990, was caused by electromagnetic interference of the type that could result from transmission from a military source in the vicinity of the crash. This article, entitled "The Fall of EgyptAir 990", was also published in The New York Review of Books on October 5, 2000. In a critique of Professor Scarry's hypothesis, Professor Didier de Fontaine, Professor Emeritus at UC Berkeley, discusses what he views as the less than scientific basis of Scarry's "unfriendly skies" scenarios, and concludes that she has engaged in "voodoo science".

== Education ==
- A.B., 1968, Chatham College
- A.M., Ph.D., 1974, University of Connecticut

== Honors ==
- Guggenheim Fellowship (1987), Philosophy
- Truman Capote Award for Literary Criticism (2000) for Dreaming by the Book
- Elected Member, American Philosophical Society (2013)
- Honorary doctorate from Uppsala University, Sweden (2018)

== Works ==
=== Books ===
- Naming thy name : cross talk in Shakespeare's sonnets. Farrar, Straus and Giroux. 2016. ISBN 9780374279936.
- Thermonuclear Monarchy: Choosing Between Democracy and Doom. W. W. Norton. 2014. ISBN 9780393089929.
- Thinking in an Emergency. W. W. Norton. 2011. ISBN 9780393081046.
- Rule of Law, Misrule of Men. Boston Review Books. 2010. ISBN 9780262265775.
- Who Defended the Country? A New Democracy Forum on Authoritarian versus Democratic Approaches to National Defense on 9/11. Beacon Press. 2003. ISBN 9780807004579.
- On Beauty and Being Just, Princeton University Press, 1999, ISBN 9780691048758
- Dreaming by the Book. Farrar, Straus & Giroux. 1999. ISBN 9780691070766.
- Resisting Representation. Oxford University Press. 1994. ISBN 9780198025023. "Elaine Scarry."
- Literature and the Body: Essays on Populations and Persons, Johns Hopkins University Press, 1990, ISBN 9780801836046
- The Body in Pain: The Making and Unmaking of the World. Oxford University Press. 1985. ISBN 9780195049961.

=== Essays ===
- The Fall of EgyptAir 990 (The New York Review of Books, 2000)
- The Fall of TWA 800: The Possibility of Electromagnetic Interference (The New York Review of Books, 1998)
- On Beauty and Being Just

=== Editor ===
- Daniel L. Schacter; Elaine Scarry, eds. (2002). Memory, Brain and Belief. Harvard University Press. ISBN 9780674007192.
- Fins de Siècle: English Poetry in 1590, 1690, 1790, 1890, 1990, Johns Hopkins University Press, 1995, ISBN 9780801849282
