= Nicholas Boggs =

American writer

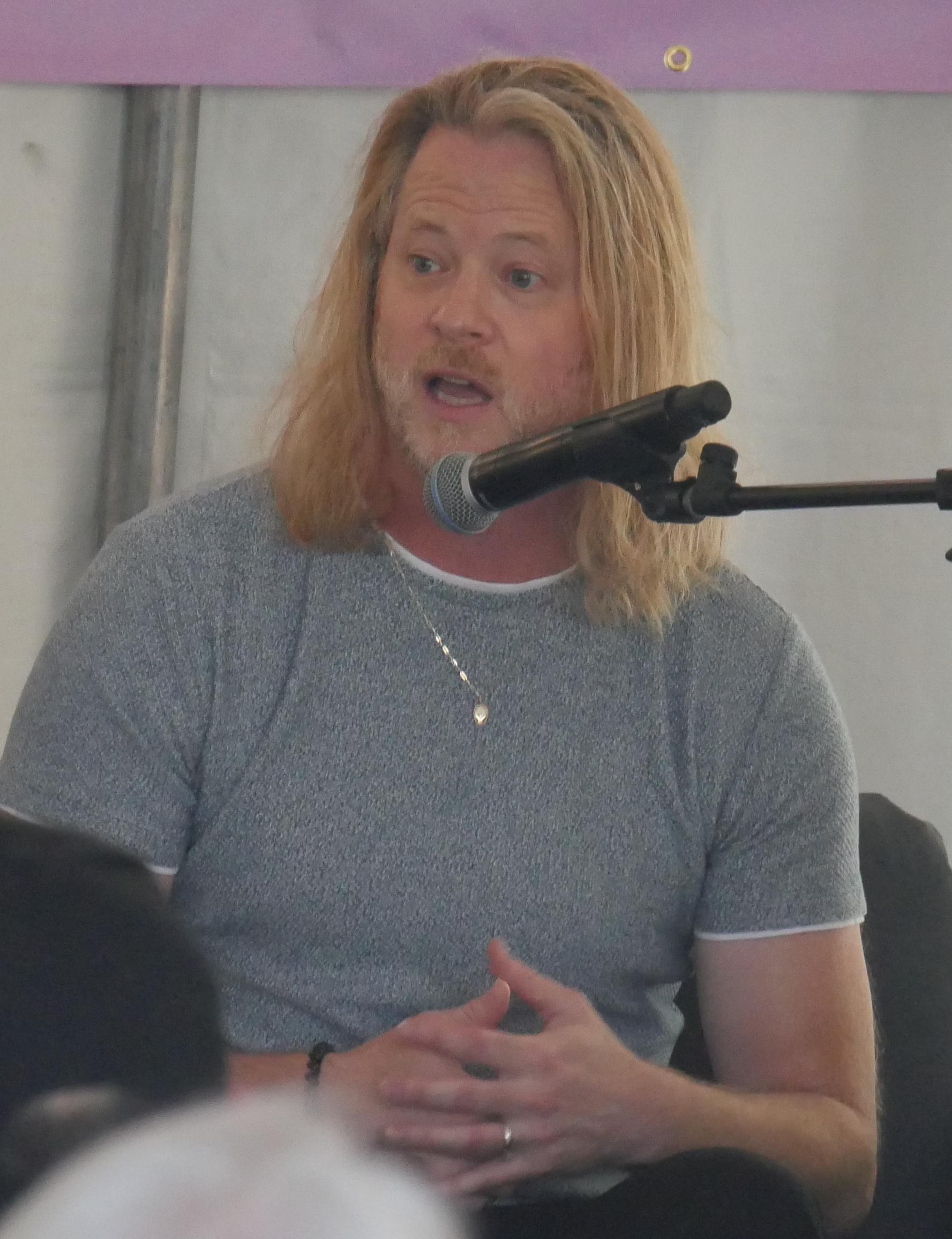
- Boggs reading at the 2025 Baltimore Book Festival
- Born: October 17, 1973 (age 53); Washington, D.C., US
- Education: Yale University (BA); American University (MFA); Columbia University (PhD)
- Occupation: Writer
- Partner: Marlon James
- Writing career
- Notable work: Baldwin: A Love Story
- Notable awards: Whiting Award (2023); John Leonard Prize (2025)
- Website: nicholasboggs.com

Nicholas Boggs (born October 17, 1973) is an American writer. He is the author of the 2025 biography of American writer and civil rights activist James Baldwin titled Baldwin: A Love Story. Boggs also co-edited the 2018 reprinting of Little Man Little Man, a 1976 children's book by Baldwin.

== Early life and education ==
Nicholas Boggs was born in Washington, D.C. and grew up in the Cleveland Park neighborhood, the son of a civil rights lawyer and a music teacher. He was a celebrated professional boy soprano, performing at the Kennedy Center and elsewhere, and then a standout track and field athlete. Boggs was educated at Alice Deal Middle School and attended Woodrow Wilson High School before graduating from St. Albans School in 1992. He earned his Bachelor of Arts in English from Yale University in 1997, a Master of Fine Arts in creative writing from American University, and a Doctor of Philosophy in English from Columbia University.

== Career ==
Boggs is the recipient of a 2023 Whiting Creative Nonfiction Grant and fellowships from the National Endowment for the Humanities, the Leon Levy Center for Biography, the Beinecke Library and Gilder Lehrman Center at Yale, the Schomburg Center Scholars-in-Residence Program, and the National Humanities Center, as well as residencies at Yaddo and MacDowell.

Boggs co-edited with Jennifer DeVere Brody a new edition of Little Man, Little Man, James Baldwin's only children's book, which was reissued by Duke University Press in 2018, with an afterword by Aisha Karefa-Smart, Baldwin's niece, and an introduction by Boggs with Brody.

In 2025, Farrar, Straus and Giroux published Baldwin: A Love Story, Boggs's debut book, the first major biography of James Baldwin in three decades, in which Boggs draws on newly uncovered archival material, as well as original research and interviews, to explore the relationships that were key to Baldwin's life and work. An instant New York Times bestseller, in 2026 it was optioned for film by the production company Anonymous Content, which will co-produce the film with Barack and Michelle Obama’s Higher Ground Productions. Boggs is co-writing the script with Marlon James, with both Boggs and James serving as executive producers.

He currently teaches English and Creative Writing at Stony Brook University.

== Personal life ==
Boggs's partner since 2018 is novelist Marlon James. They live in New York City.

== Reception for Boggs's writing ==
Charles Blow, writing in The New York Times, called Baldwin: A Love Story "sensational", "stunning", with a writing style that "dazzles and awes", and also praised the book's comprehension and Boggs' willingness to explore Baldwin's queer identity. The Los Angeles Times described the book as being "lively and vigorously researched", while The Boston Globe wrote that "Boggs comes about as close as anyone has to wrapping his arms around Baldwin".

In a review for The New Yorker, Louis Menand praised the book for being multi-faceted and acknowledging Baldwin's politics in their entirety. In a starred review, Kirkus Reviews called it "A dynamic portrait that deepens our understanding of a complex artist."

Baldwin: A Love Story was selected as a New York Times Notable Book of 2025. It was named by the magazines Time and The Atlantic among the top ten books of the year.

== Awards and honors ==
Year	Title	Award	Result	Ref.
2025	Baldwin: A Love Story	John Leonard Prize	Winner	
2025	Baldwin: A Love Story	Kirkus Prize	Finalist	
2026	Baldwin: A Love Story	Audie Award for History or Biography	Winner	
2026	Baldwin: A Love Story	Israel Fishman Non-Fiction Award	Winner	
2026	Baldwin: A Love Story	PEN/Jacqueline Bograd Weld Award for Biography	Winner	
2026	Baldwin: A Love Story	Baillie Gifford Prize	Finalist	
2026	Baldwin: A Love Story	Randy Shilts Award for Gay Nonfiction	Winner	
2026	Baldwin: A Love Story	Phi Beta Kappa/Christian Gauss Award	Winner	
2026	Baldwin: A Love Story	Truman Capote Award for Literary Criticism	Winner	

== Works ==
=== Biography ===
- Baldwin: A Love Story. Farrar, Straus and Giroux. 2025. ISBN 9780374178710.

=== As editor ===
- James Baldwin (2018). Nicholas Boggs; Jennifer DeVere Brody (eds.). Little Man Little Man: A Story of Childhood. Duke University Press. ISBN 9781478000044.
