= Marlena (novel) =

2017 American novel

- First edition cover
- Author: Julie Buntin
- Language: English
- Genre: Psychological fiction
- Published: 2017 (Henry Holt and Company)
- Publication place: United States
- Media type: Print (hardcover)
- Pages: 274
- ISBN: 9781627797641
- OCLC: 950430570

Marlena is the debut novel of Julie Buntin published in April 2017 by Henry Holt and Company. Marlena was a National Book Critics Circle John Leonard Prize Finalist, and it was named a Best Book of the Year by BuzzFeed, The Washington Post, Esquire, Harper's Bazaar, NPR, Nylon, HuffPost, and Barnes and Noble. The novel was named an Indie Next Pick and a Barnes and Noble Discover Pick. It was chosen for the Belletrist Book Club and Book of the Month.

Critics drew comparisons to the work of other authors: The Times of London compared Marlena to the work of Zadie Smith, The New York Times and Vogue (magazine) to that of Elena Ferrante, and SFGate to those of Stuart Dybek and of Marilynne Robinson. Prior to publication, the book received starred reviews from industry magazines Kirkus Reviews, Publishers Weekly, and Booklist. In 2018, the Library of Michigan named Marlena a Michigan Notable Book, and the Nevada Humanities selected it for the Nevada Reads statewide book club.
