= Anthony Marra =

American fiction writer (born 1984)

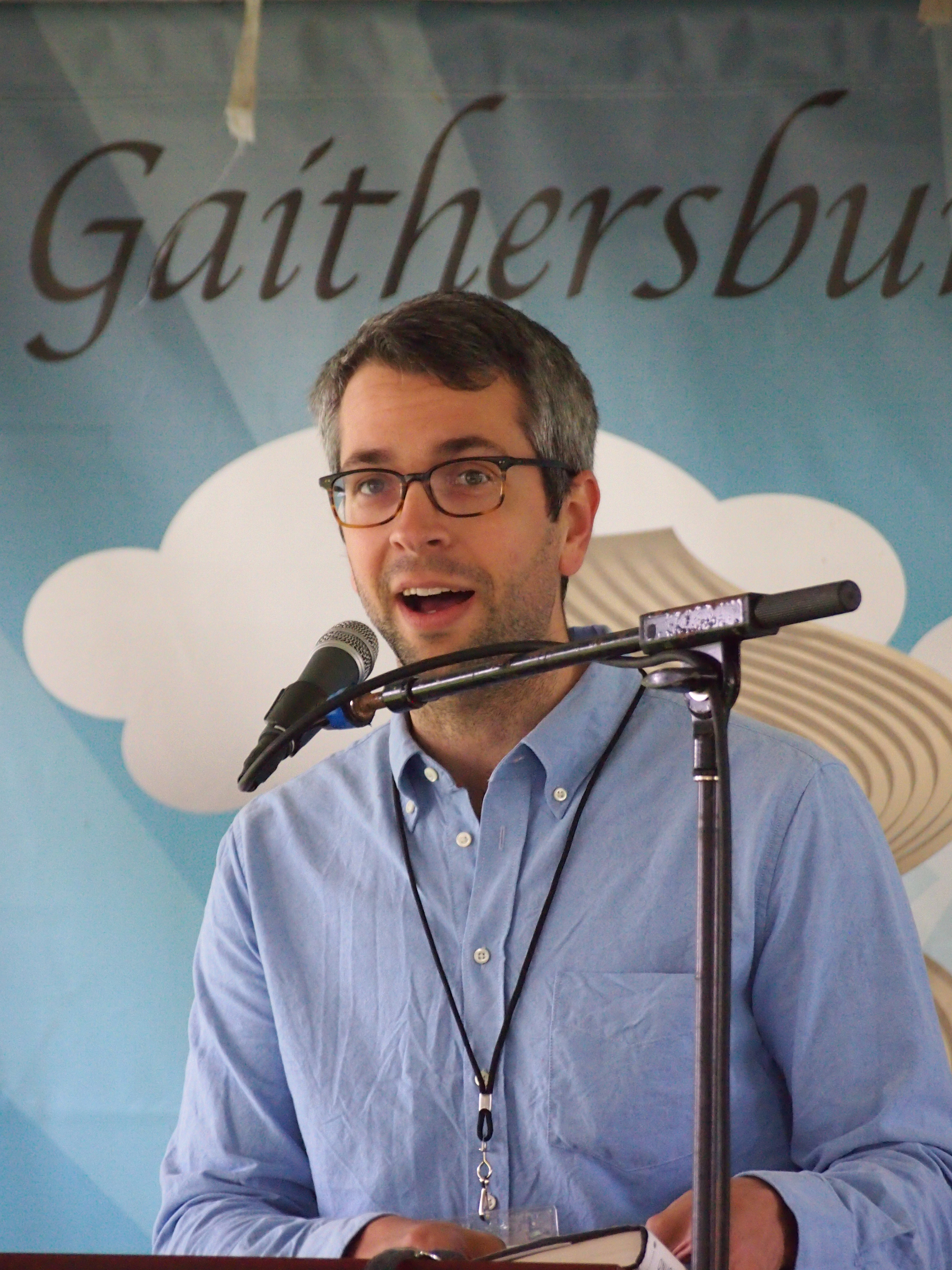
- Reading at the 2016 Gaithersburg Book Festival
- Born: 1984 (age 41–42); Washington, D.C.
- Education: Landon School
- Alma mater: University of Southern California; Iowa Writers Workshop
- Occupation: Writer
- Writing career
- Genres: Historical fiction, fiction, short fiction
- Notable works: A Constellation of Vital Phenomena, The Tsar of Love and Techno, Mercury Pictures Presents
- Website: anthonymarra.net

Anthony Marra (born 1984) is an American fiction writer. Marra has won numerous awards for his short stories, as well as his first novel, A Constellation of Vital Phenomena, which was a New York Times best seller.

== Personal life ==
Marra was born in Washington, D.C., attended high school in Bethesda, Maryland, and has lived in Eastern Europe, though he now resides in Oakland, California.

== Education ==
Marra attended the Landon School in Bethesda, Maryland before attending the University of Southern California where he earned a bachelor's degree in creative writing. He received a Master of Fine Arts degree from the Iowa Writers' Workshop. Between 2011 and 2013, he was a Stegner Fellow at Stanford University, where he also taught as the Jones Lecturer in Fiction.

Marra has also received fellowships from the John Simon Guggenheim Memorial Foundation and the National Endowment for the Arts.

== Writing ==
Marra has contributed pieces to The Atlantic, Narrative Magazine, Granta, The Rumpus, New York Times, The Washington Post, Wall Street Journal, and The New Republic.

== Literary awards ==
| Year | Work | Award | Category | Result | Ref |
|---|---|---|---|---|---|
| 2010 | "Chechnya" | Pushcart Prize | — | Winner | |
| 2010 | "Chechnya" | Narrative Prize | — | Winner | |
| 2012 | — | Whiting Award | — | Winner | |
| 2013 | A Constellation of Vital Phenomena | Barnes & Noble Discover Great New Writers Award | Fiction | Winner | |
| 2013 | A Constellation of Vital Phenomena | California Book Award | First Fiction | Winner | |
| 2013 | A Constellation of Vital Phenomena | Goodreads Choice Award | Fiction | Nominee | |
| 2013 | A Constellation of Vital Phenomena | National Book Award | Fiction | Nominee | |
| 2013 | A Constellation of Vital Phenomena | National Book Critics Circle Award | John Leonard Prize | Winner | |
| 2013 | A Constellation of Vital Phenomena | Booklist Editors' Choice | Adult Books | Selection | |
| 2013 | A Constellation of Vital Phenomena | New York Times Notable Book of the Year | — | Selection | |
| 2014 | A Constellation of Vital Phenomena | Andrew Carnegie Medal for Excellence | Fiction | Longlist | |
| 2014 | A Constellation of Vital Phenomena | Anisfield-Wolf Book Award | Fiction | Winner | |
| 2014 | A Constellation of Vital Phenomena | The Athens Prize for Literature | Περιοδικό (δέ)κατα | Winner | |
| 2014 | A Constellation of Vital Phenomena | Booklist's Notable Books | — | Selection | |
| 2014 | A Constellation of Vital Phenomena | Carla Furstenberg Cohen Fiction Award | Fiction | Winner | |
| 2014 | A Constellation of Vital Phenomena | Dayton Literary Peace Prize | Fiction | Finalist | |
| 2014 | A Constellation of Vital Phenomena | Indies Choice Book Award | Adult Debut | Winner | |
| 2014 | A Constellation of Vital Phenomena | PEN/Robert W. Bingham Prize | — | Shortlist | |
| 2014 | A Constellation of Vital Phenomena | Young Lions Fiction Award | — | Finalist | |
| 2015 | A Constellation of Vital Phenomena | International Dublin Literary Award | — | Longlist | |
| 2016 | "The Grozny Tourist Bureau" | National Magazine Award | Fiction | Winner | |
| 2017 | — | Granta's Best of Young American Novelists | — | Selection | |
| 2017 | The Tsar of Love and Techno | Literature.gr Phrase of the Year Prize | — | Winner | |
| 2018 | The Tsar of Love and Techno | Simpson Family Literary Prize | — | Winner | |
| | Self | Jeanette Haien Ballard Writer's Prize | — | Winner | |

== Bibliography ==
=== Books ===
- —— (2013). A Constellation of Vital Phenomena (hardcover 1st ed.). Random House. ISBN 9780770436407.
- —— (2015). The Tsar of Love and Techno: Stories (hardcover 1st ed.). Hogarth Press. ISBN 9780770436438.
- —— (2022). Mercury Pictures Presents (hardcover 1st ed.). Hogarth Press. ISBN 9781399804400.

=== Short stories ===
- —— (Fall 2009). "Chechnya". Narrative Magazine.
- —— (May 31, 2012). "The Wolves of Bilaya Forest". The Atlantic.
- —— (April 25, 2017). "Lipari". Granta.

=== Essays ===
- —— (July 7, 2011). "Giving Up". The Rumpus.
- —— (May 7, 2013). "When a Sentence Changes Your Life—Then Changes Its Own Meaning". The Atlantic.

=== Contributions ===
- xo Orpheus: Fifty New Myths, published September 24, 2013 by Penguin Books
- The Best American Nonrequired Reading 2016, published October 4, 2016 by Mariner Books
