= Mark McGurl =

American literary critic

- Occupation: Professor
- Writing career
- Genre: American literature
- Notable works: The Program Era: Postwar Fiction and the Rise of Creative Writing

Mark McGurl is an American literary critic specializing in 20th-century American literature. He is the Albert L. Guérard Professor of Literature at Stanford University.

== Background ==
McGurl received his B.A. from Harvard University and Ph.D. in Comparative Literature from Johns Hopkins University. He has also worked as a journalist for The New York Times and The New York Review of Books. In 2011, McGurl received the Truman Capote Award for Literary Criticism for The Program Era: Postwar Fiction and the Rise of Creative Writing.

== Publications ==
=== Books ===
- The Novel Art: Elevations of American Fiction after Henry James (Princeton University Press, 2001)
- The Program Era: Postwar Fiction and the Rise of Creative Writing (Harvard University Press, 2009)
- Everything & Less: The Novel in the Age of Amazon (Verso Books, 2021)

=== Articles and essays ===
- "Ordinary Doom: Literary Studies in the Waste Land of the Present,"New Literary History," Fall 2010
- "A Response to Elif Batuman's Review of The Program Era in the London Review of Books" Official Website: The Program Era Reviews, October 1/October 10, 2010
- "The Zombie Renaissance," n+1 no.9 spring 2010
- "Understanding Iowa: Flannery O'Connor B.A., M.F.A." American Literary History, Summer 2007
- "Learning from Little Tree: The Political Education of the Counterculture" Yale Journal of Criticism, Fall 2005
- "The Program Era: Pluralisms of Postwar American Fiction" Critical Inquiry, Fall 2005
- "Social Geometries: Taking Place in Henry James" Representations 68, Autumn 1999, 59-83
- "Making 'Literature' of It:Hammett and High Culture" American Literary History, 9.4, Winter 1997, 702-717
- "Making It Big: Picturing the Radio Age in King Kong" Critical Inquiry, Spring 1996
