= Little Man Little Man =

1976 children's novel by James Baldwin

Little Man Little Man: A Story of Childhood
- First edition
- Author: James Baldwin
- Illustrator: Yoran Cazac
- Language: English
- Genre: Children's novel
- Publisher: The Dial Press
- Publication date: 1976
- Publication place: United States
- Media type: Print (Hardback & Paperback)
- Pages: 96 pages
- ISBN: 0-8037-4859-0

Little Man Little Man: A Story of Childhood is a 1976 children's novel written by James Baldwin and Yoran Cazac.

== Plot introduction ==
TJ recounts what he experiences while playing ball outside.

=== Explanation of the title ===
"Little man, little man" is what Miss Lee calls WT after covering up his gash.

== Plot summary ==
TJ plays ball with his friends outside; he grazes his knee, then hurts his buttocks. A police car drives by, looking for a man; they run away. TJ's father then invites WT over for cocoa. Later, TJ goes shopping for Miss Lee, under the aegis of WT. TJ is then summoned by Miss Beanpole; she wants him to go shopping for her; he goes with his three friends. They go to a store whose owner is Puerto Rican. On the way back, while playing ball again, WT hurts his foot and starts bleeding – a bottle fell down from a window and the shards hurt him. They go to Mr Man's and Miss Lee covers up his gash, starts crying, then gives him a Pepsi Cola. In the end, Blinky dances to Mr Man's record, to the delights of Miss Lee and Mr Man.

== Characters ==
In addition to TJ, a four-year-old boy from Harlem, there are seven characters:

- TJ's parents
- WT, a seven-year-old boy. He has an older brother. His father has left home and his mother works till dark. He wants to become a boxer.
- Blinky, an eight-year-old girl. She wears nothing but blue jeans. She speaks some Spanish.
- Mr. Man, the janitor. He may be thirty-seven years old. He likes to play music.
- Mrs Lee, Mr Man's wife. She has a drinking problem. She worked as a nurse before she got married.
- Miss Beanpole, a neighbour who likes to look out the window and locks herself in her own apartment. Miss Beanpole is not her real name; TJ cannot remember it.

== Allusions to other works ==
- Mr Man is said to be listening to The Rolling Stones's "Satisfaction"; later, "Night Train" is mentioned.
- TJ's father is said to have taken his son to a Stevie Wonder concert.

== Allusions to actual life ==
- The book is dedicated to Beauford Delaney.
- TJ is said to look up to Hank Aaron.
- WT is said to long to be a boxer like Sonny Liston.
- TJ sees a copy of Muhammad Speaks in a store; he remembers his father disapproves of it while his mother thinks anything is worth reading.

== Publication history ==
Little Man Little Man: A Story of Childhood was reviewed as "experimental, enigmatic picture book that straddled the line between children’s and adult literature," and after its initial publication in 1976, it soon went out of print. In 2018, Duke University Press published a new edition, with an afterword by Aisha Karefa-Smart, Baldwin's niece, and co-edited and introduced by scholar Nicholas Boggs with Jennifer DeVere Brody.
