= Julia Phillips (author) =

American novelist

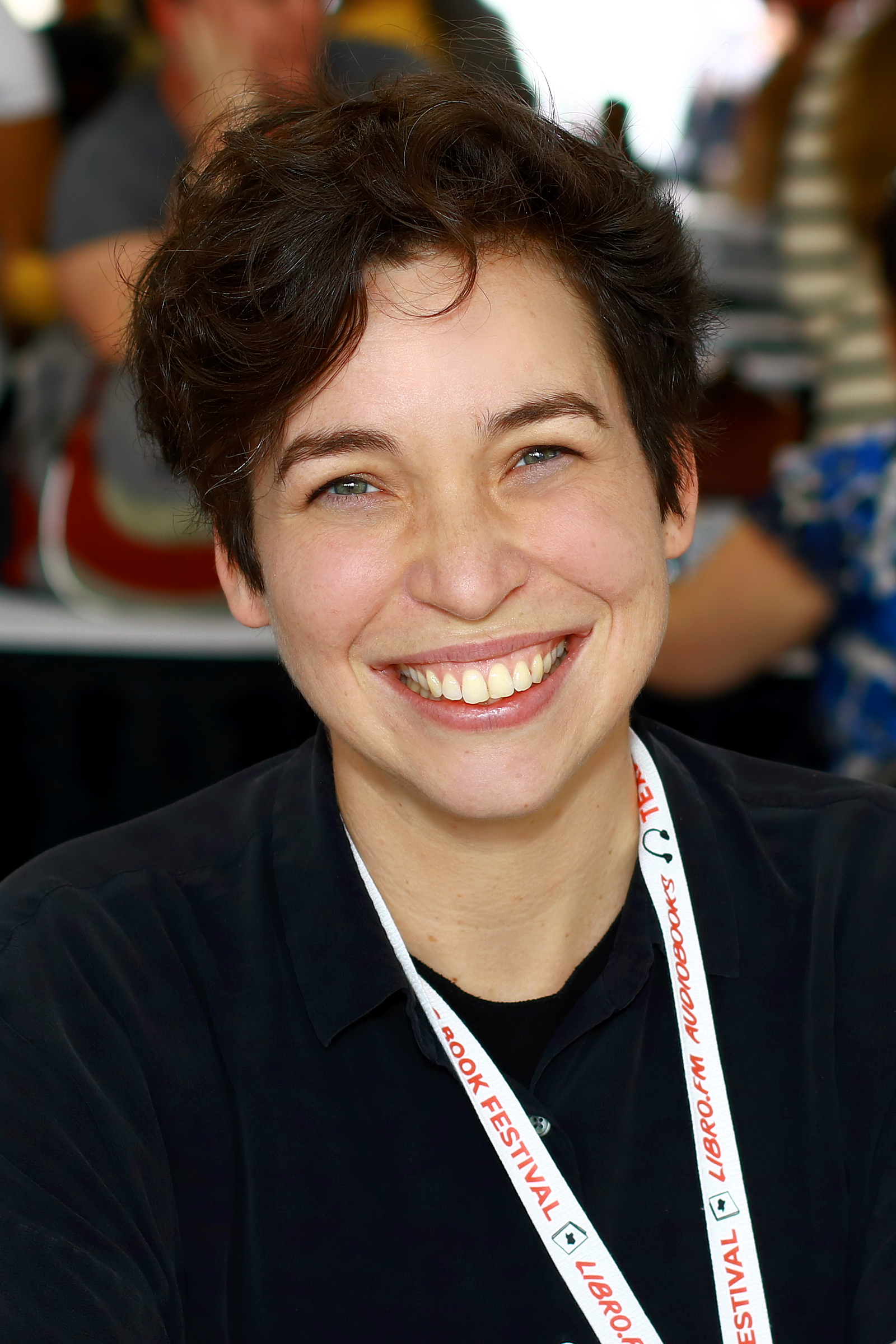
- Phillips at the 2024 Texas Book Festival.
- Born: 1988 or 1989 (age 35–36); Montclair, New Jersey, U.S.
- Education: Barnard College (BA)
- Occupation: Author
- Notable work: Disappearing Earth; Bear
- Website: juliaphillipswrites.com

Julia Phillips (born February 4, 1988) is an American author. Her book Disappearing Earth was a finalist for the 2019 National Book Award for Fiction.

== Early life and education ==
Phillips attended Montclair High School and earned her Bachelor of Arts degree in English from Barnard College. She spent a semester of college abroad in Moscow, and was a volunteer at the Crime Victims Treatment Center in New York City for more than a decade.

== Career ==
After graduating from college, Phillips earned a Fulbright Program grant allowing her to conduct research in Russia regarding how foreign investment and tourism have affected the Kamchatka Peninsula. She also wrote blog posts for The Moscow Times. During her time in Kamchatka, she began exploring the theme of what everyday harm or hurt against women looks like. She did not wish to pursue the narrative of trauma, but rather the everyday living experiences of women.

This eventually led to the publication of her debut novel Disappearing Earth in 2019, which was shortlisted for the 2019 National Book Award for Fiction. The book, which was based on the fictional kidnapping of two girls in the Kamchatka Peninsula, was also named one of The New York Times Top 10 Best Books of 2019.

== Awards ==
Year	Work	Award	Category	Result	Ref.
2019	Disappearing Earth	Center for Fiction First Novel Prize	—	Shortlisted	
2019	Disappearing Earth	Goodreads Choice Awards	Mystery & Thriller	Nominated—14th	
2019	Disappearing Earth	National Book Award	Fiction	Finalist	
2019	Disappearing Earth	National Book Critics Circle Award	John Leonard Prize	Finalist	
2020	Disappearing Earth	Andrew Carnegie Medals for Excellence	Fiction	Longlisted	
2020	Disappearing Earth	Young Lions Fiction Award	—	Finalist	
2025	Bear	Carol Shields Prize for Fiction	—	Longlisted (pending)	
2025	Bear	Joyce Carol Oates Literary Prize	—	Finalist (pending)	

== Bibliography ==
- Phillips, Julia (2019). Disappearing Earth. New York: Knopf. ISBN 978-0-525-52041-2.
- —— (2024). Bear. New York: Hogarth. ISBN 978-0-525-52043-6.
