= Baldwin: A Love Story =

2025 biography by Nicholas Boggs

- First edition cover
- Author: Nicholas Boggs
- Publisher: Farrar, Straus and Giroux
- Publication date: August 19, 2025
- ISBN: 978-0-374-17871-0

Baldwin: A Love Story is a 2025 biography of James Baldwin written by Nicholas Boggs. It received positive feedback from critics.

== Overview ==
The book is structured as a "Love Story" in four parts. The first part explores Baldwin's youth and relationship with Beauford Delaney. The second part is named after Lucien Happersberger and deals with the early stages of Baldwin's career. The third part, named after Engin Cezzar, follows the mid-stage, while the final section is named after Yoran Cazac and describes the final years of Baldwin's life.

== Publication history ==
The book was published in the United States by Farrar, Straus and Giroux on August 19, 2025.

== Reception ==
Charles Blow, writing in The New York Times, praised the book's comprehension and Boggs' willingness to explore Baldwin's queer identity. The Los Angeles Times described the book as being "lively and vigorously researched," while The Boston Globe wrote that "Boggs comes about as close as anyone has to wrapping his arms around Baldwin." In a review written for The New Yorker, Louis Menand praised the book for being multi-faceted and acknowledging Baldwin's politics in their entirety.

The Nation noted the "difficult task" of reconciling Baldwin's private and public lives and praised Boggs for tracing "the centrality of love" through Baldwin's work. Commonweal, meanwhile, criticized that framing and Boggs' perceived tendency to explain away "questionable" behavior from Baldwin. The Washington Independent Review of Books described the biography as "superb" and Smithsonian called it "complete."

Shelf Awareness described the book as having "immense scope and profound insight" in a positive review. Both Kirkus Reviews and Publishers Weekly published starred reviews, with the former praising the book's organization and the latter offering praise for Boggs' research and interview process. Booklist also published a starred review, calling the book "an emotionally rich and complex look at a writer who exemplifies the impossibility of separating the personal from the political."

== Awards and honors ==
Baldwin: A Love Story was named a New York Times Notable Book of 2025.

TIME and The Atlantic named it one of the Best Books of 2025.

Awards for Baldwin: A Love Story
Year	Award	Result	Ref.
2025	John Leonard Prize	Winner	
2025	Kirkus Prize	Finalist	
2026	Audie Award for History or Biography	Winner	
2026	Israel Fishman Non-Fiction Award	Winner	
2026	PEN/Jacqueline Bograd Weld Award for Biography	Winner	
2026	Baillie Gifford Prize	Finalist	
2026	Randy Shilts Award for Gay Nonfiction	Winner	
2026	Phi Beta Kappa/Christian Gauss Award	Winner	
2026	Truman Capote Award for Literary Criticism	Winner	
