= Philip Fisher (author) =

Philip Fisher (born 1941) is the Felice Crowl Reid Professor of English and American Literature at Harvard University and an author.

He was a co-winner of the Truman Capote Award for Literary Criticism in 2000 for his book, Still the New World: American Literature in a Culture of Creative Destruction.

He graduated from Harvard University with a M.A. in 1966 and Ph.D. in 1971. He earned an A.B. in 1963 from the University of Pittsburgh.

== Books ==
- The Vehement Passions (2002)
- Still the New World: American Literature in a Culture of Creative Destruction (1999)
- Wonder, the Rainbow and the Aesthetics of Rare Experiences (1998)
- Making and Effacing Art (1991)
- Hard Facts (1986)
- Making Up Society (1981)
