= Susan Stewart (poet) =

American poet and literary critic (born 1952)

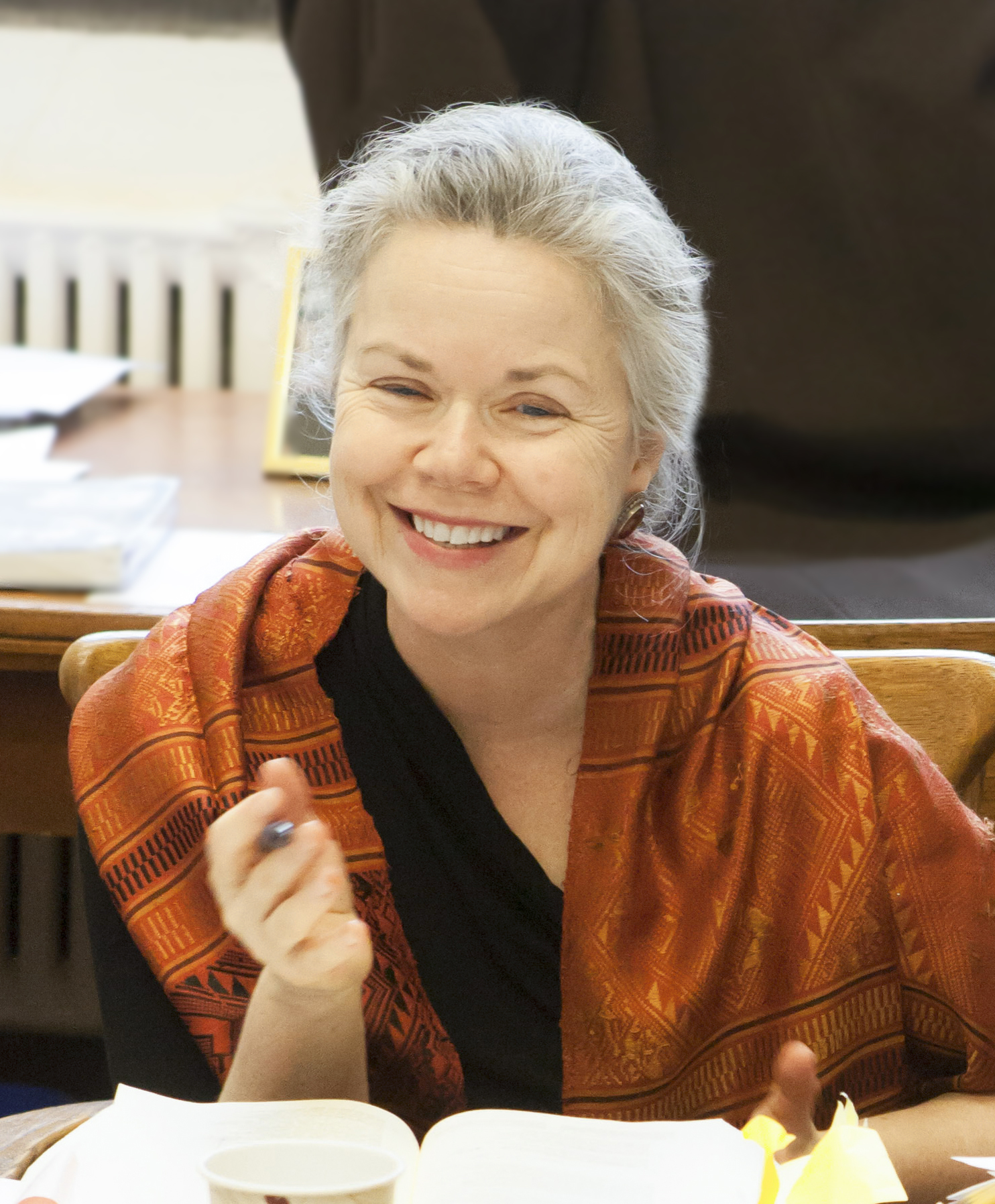
- Born: March 15, 1952 (age 74)
- Education: Dickinson College (BA); Johns Hopkins University (MFA); University of Pennsylvania (PhD)
- Writing career
- Notable awards: MacArthur Fellowship (1997)

Susan Stewart (born March 15, 1952) is an American poet and literary critic. She is the Avalon Foundation University Professor in the Humanities and Professor of English, emerita, at Princeton University. In 2023, she was elected to the American Philosophical Society.

== Life ==
Professor Stewart holds degrees from Dickinson College (B.A. in English and anthropology), the Johns Hopkins University (M.F.A. in poetics) and the University of Pennsylvania (Ph.D. in folklore). She teaches the history of poetry, aesthetics, and the philosophy of literature, most recently at Princeton University.

Her poems have appeared in many journals including: The American Poetry Review, The Paris Review, Poetry, Tri-Quarterly, Gettysburg Review, Harper's, Georgia Review, Ploughshares, and Beloit Poetry Journal.

In the late 2000s she collaborated with composer James Primosch on a song cycle commissioned by the Chicago Symphony that premiered in the fall of 2009. She has served on the judging panel of the Wallace Stevens Award on six occasions.

In 2005 Professor Stewart was elected a Chancellor of the Academy of American Poets and a member of the American Academy of Arts and Sciences.

About her work, the poet and critic Allen Grossman has written,

Stewart has built a poetic syntax capable of conveying an utterly singular account of consciousness, by the light of which it is possible to see the structure of the human world with a new clarity and an unforeseen precision, possible only in her presence and by means of her art.

== Awards ==
- Lila Wallace Individual Writer's Award, a Reader's Digest Writer's Award
- two National Endowment for the Arts grants
- 1986 Guggenheim Fellowship
- 1995 Pew Fellowships in the Arts
- 1997 MacArthur Foundation Fellowship
- 2003 Christian Gauss Award for Literary Criticism from Phi Beta Kappa, for Poetry and the Fate of the Senses
- 2003 National Book Critics Circle award, for Columbarium
- 2004 Truman Capote Award for Literary Criticism for Poetry and the Fate of the Senses

== Work ==
=== Criticism ===
- Nonsense: aspects of intertextuality in folklore and literature. Johns Hopkins University Press. 1979. ISBN 978-0-8018-2258-2.
- Crimes of Writing. Oxford University Press. 1991. ISBN 978-0-19-506617-3.
- On Longing: Narratives of the Miniature, the Gigantic, the Souvenir, the Collection. Duke University Press. 1993. ISBN 978-0-8223-1366-3.
- Poetry and the Fate of the Senses. University of Chicago Press. 2002. ISBN 978-0-226-77414-5.
- The Open Studio: Essays on Art and Aesthetics. University of Chicago Press. 2005. ISBN 978-0-226-77447-3. a collection of her writings on contemporary art.
- The Poet's Freedom:A Notebook on Making. University of Chicago Press. 2011. ISBN 978-0-226-77387-2. a meditation on what freedom means to the artist.

=== Poetry ===
- Yellow Stars and Ice. Princeton University Press. 1981. ISBN 978-0-691-01379-4.
- The Hive. University of Georgia Press. 1987. ISBN 978-0-8203-3267-3.
- The Forest. University of Chicago Press. 1995. ISBN 978-0-226-77410-7.
- Columbarium. University of Chicago Press. 2003. ISBN 978-0-226-77444-2.
- Red Rover. University of Chicago Press. 2008. ISBN 978-0-226-77454-1.

Cinder: New and Selected Poems (2017, Graywolf Press)

=== Translations ===
- Euripides (2001). Andromache. Translators Susan Stewart, Wesley Smith. Oxford University Press. ISBN 978-0-19-512561-0.
- Scipione (2001). Brunella Antomarini; Susan Stewart (eds.). Poesie e prose. Charta. ISBN 978-88-8158-329-4.

=== Anthologies ===
- David Walker, ed. (2006). American Alphabets: 25 Contemporary Poets. Oberlin College Press. ISBN 978-0-932440-28-0.
- Robert Hass; David Lehman, eds. (2001). "Apple". The Best American Poetry 2001. Simon and Schuster. ISBN 978-0-7432-0384-5.
