= Red Comet =

2020 book by Heather Clark

Red Comet: The Short Life and Blazing Art of Sylvia Plath
- Author: Heather Clark
- Language: English
- Subject: Sylvia Plath
- Publisher: Alfred A. Knopf
- Publication date: October 27, 2020
- Pages: 1152
- ISBN: 978-0-307-96116-7

Red Comet: The Short Life and Blazing Art of Sylvia Plath is a 2020 book by Heather Clark that examines Sylvia Plath.

== Reception ==
It was selected for the New York Times Book Review's "10 Best Books of 2021" list and was a finalist for the 2020 National Book Critics Circle Award for Biography and 2021 Pulitzer Prize for Biography or Autobiography. It won the Truman Capote Award for Literary Criticism in 2022.
