= Courtney Maum =

American writer

- Maum at the 2026 Texas Book Festival.
- Born: Greenwich, Connecticut, U.S.
- Education: Brown University (AB)
- Occupation: Writer
- Spouse: Diego Ongaro
- Writing career
- Genres: Fiction; Non-fiction
- Notable work: Costalegre (2019)
- Website: www.courtneymaum.com

Courtney Maum is an American author and book coach. She is the author of the novels I'm Having So Much Fun Here Without You, Touch, and Costalegre, and the chapbook, Notes from Mexico. She has been published in outlets such as The New York Times, Tin House, The Oprah Magazine, and Buzzfeed. Her 2022 memoir, The Year of the Horses, was named a Publishers Weekly and Boston.com "Best Book of Summer."

Her newest novel, Alan Opts Out, was released June 2, 2026.

== Early life and education ==
Originally from Greenwich, Connecticut, Maum grew up surrounded by the countryside and with a love of horses. She graduated from Brown University with a bachelor's degree in comparative literature.

== Career ==
Maum followed up her debut novel, I'm Having So Much Fun Here Without You (2014), with the novels Touch (2017) and Costalegre (2019). Her second novel, Touch, is a romantic comedy and satirical novel about a trend forecaster. It was named a New York Times Book Review Editors’ Choice and one of NPR's “Best Books of 2017.”

Her third novel, Costalegre, is a book inspired by the life of Peggy Guggenheim's daughter, Pegeen. Kirkus Reviews called the book, "A lush chronicle of wealth, art, adventure, loneliness, love, and folly told by a narrator you won't be able to forget."

She later published her memoir, The Year of the Horses (2022). Maum wrote the memoir when she was 38 years old, suffering from depression and struggling to find happiness in her life. In an interview with the US Polo Association, she described the book as "about how reclaiming my childhood love of horses ultimately got me through a deep depression in my late thirties, and how that same love for horses led me to the sport of polo, which helped me to face my fears both in the saddle, and outside of the barn.”

In early 2020, she published the writer's guidebook Before and After the Book Deal: A Writer's Guide to Finishing, Publishing, Promoting and Surviving Your First Book Deal (edited by Julie Buntin) via Catapult. Rachel Krantz at Buzzfeed said, "Anyone who’s trying to get a book published or is in the process of being published should consider this guide required reading. The publishing industry is unnecessarily opaque, and Maum is here to tell it like it is..." The book was named by Forbes as "1 of the 10 Most Anticipated Books of the Year" and chosen as an American Booksellers Association Indie Next Selection. The book features over 150 contributions from bestselling authors, as well as agents, film scouts, film producers, translators, activists, and editors. Publishers Weekly called the book: "Invaluable to new writers seeking advice and support in navigating their first publication."

"Before and After the Book Deal" is also the name of her bestselling Substack newsletter.

Maum's fourth novel, Alan Opts Out, was published by Little, Brown and Company in June 2026. Publishers Weekly gave the novel a starred review, calling it a "pitch-perfect satire...the novel offers a fierce and funny portrait of late-stage capitalism and its limited supply of happiness. It’s a gem." In July 2026, Deadline announced that the novel had been picked up for television by HBO from Emily Kapnek and Bill Lawrence.

== Personal life ==
Maum is married to French filmmaker Diego Ongaro. They live in Connecticut with their daughter.

== Bibliography ==
=== Novels ===
- I'm Having So Much Fun Here Without You. Touchstone Books/Simon & Schuster. 2014. ISBN 9781476764559.
- Touch. Penguin Publishing Group. 2017. ISBN 9780735212145.
- Costalegre. Tin House/Zando. 2019. ISBN 9781947793361.
- Alan Opts Out. Little, Brown and Company. 2026. ISBN 9780316599108.

=== Chapbook ===
- Notes from Mexico. The Cupboard Press. 2012.

=== Non-fiction ===
- Before and After the Book Deal. Catapult. 2020. ISBN 9781948226400.
- The Year of the Horses: A Memoir. Tin House/Zando. 2022. ISBN 9781953534828.
