= Heather Clark (writer) =

American writer and literary critic

- Education: Harvard University (BA); University of Oxford (PhD); Trinity College Dublin (MPhil)
- Occupations: Writer; literary critic; academic
- Writing career
- Notable work: Red Comet (2020)
- Website: heatherclarkauthor.com

Heather Clark is an American writer, literary critic and academic. Her biography of poet Sylvia Plath, Red Comet: The Short Life and Blazing Art of Sylvia Plath, was a finalist for the 2020 Pulitzer Prize. She is also the author of The Grief of Influence: Sylvia Plath and Ted Hughes (2011) and The Ulster Renaissance: Poetry in Belfast 1962–1972 (2006).

== Biography ==
Clark earned a BA from Harvard University and a PhD in English from University of Oxford.

Clark's first book, The Ulster Renaissance: Poetry in Belfast 1962–1972 was published by Oxford University Press in 2006. It is an exploration of the ten-year period of energetic poetic production in Belfast, Northern Ireland, driven by young poets such as Paul Muldoon, Seamus Heaney, Derek Mahon, Michael Longley, and James Simmons. The book won the Donald J. Murphy Prize for Best First Book and the Robert Rhodes Prize for Books on Literature from the American Conference for Irish Studies.

Her second book, The Grief of Influence, is an analytical study of the creative work, tumultuous marriage, and artistic rivalry of poets Sylvia Plath and Ted Hughes, published by Oxford University Press in 2011. It was chosen as a Choice Outstanding Academic Title of 2011.

In 2020, Alfred A. Knopf published Red Comet: The Short Life and Blazing Art of Sylvia Plath. At over 1,000 pages, the biography includes previously unpublished manuscripts, letters, court, police, and psychiatric records, and new interviews. In a review in The New York Times, Daphne Merkin writes,

This vast new biography sets out to recover Plath from her melodramatic legacy. Her life story—from her institutionalizations to her tempestuous marriage to Ted Hughes—has often been reduced to that of a depressive, literary femme fatale, which Clark believes ignores the poet's true genius.

In a review for the Los Angeles Times, Jessica Ferri called the book "a joyful affirmation for Plath fanatics and a legitimization of her legacy".

Clark's writing has also appeared in The New York Times, Harvard Review, TIME, The Times Literary Supplement, Literary Hub, The Boston Globe, PN Review, and elsewhere. She lives outside of New York City and is Professor Emerita at University of Huddersfield.

== Awards and grants ==
- Emory University's Manuscript, Archive, and Rare Book Library Fellowship
- Visiting U.S. Fellowship at the Eccles Centre for American Studies, British Library
- Leon Levy Biography Fellowship at the City University of New York (2016)
- Guggenheim Foundation fellowship (2022)
- National Endowment for the Humanities fellowship (2017)
- Finalist, Los Angeles Times Book Prize in Biography (2020)
- Finalist, National Book Critics Circle Award, (2020)
- Finalist, Pulitzer Prize in Biography (2021)
- Winner, Slightly Foxed Prize for Best First Biography (2020)
- Best Books, The New York Times Book Review (2021)
- Winner, Truman Capote Prize for Literary Criticism (2022)
- 2024–2025 Cullman Center Fellow

== Publications ==
- The Ulster Renaissance: Poetry in Belfast 1962–1972 (2006) ISBN 978-0199287314
- The Grief of Influence: Sylvia Plath and Ted Hughes (2011) ISBN 978-0199558193
- Red Comet: The Short Life and Blazing Art of Sylvia Plath (2020) ISBN 978-0307961167
- Sylvia Plath: A Very Short Introduction (2024) ISBN 978-0191876974
- The Scrapbook: A Novel (2025) ISBN 978-0-593-70190-4
