= Sarah M. Broom =

American writer

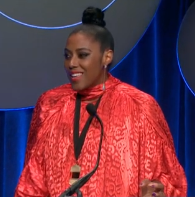
- Broom at the 2019 National Book Awards
- Born: December 31, 1979 (age 46)
- Education: University of North Texas; University of California, Berkeley
- Occupation: Writer
- Spouse: Dee Rees
- Writing career
- Subject: Memoir
- Notable work: The Yellow House (2019)
- Notable awards: National Book Award for Nonfiction (2019)
- Website: www.sarahmbroom.com

Sarah Monique Broom (born December 31, 1979) is an American writer. Her first book, The Yellow House (2019), received the National Book Award for Nonfiction.

== Early life and education ==
Broom was born on December 31, 1979 and raised in New Orleans, the youngest of twelve children. After attending Word of Faith Academy, she studied anthropology and mass communications at the University of North Texas. Broom also holds a master's degree in journalism from the University of California, Berkeley and has taught at the Columbia University School of the Arts.

== Career ==
After publishing in a variety of journals, including the New York Times Magazine, the New Yorker, and O, the Oprah Magazine, she received a 2016 Creative Nonfiction Grant from the Whiting Foundation. Broom has also been named a finalist for the New York Foundation for the Arts Fellowship in Creative Nonfiction and awarded fellowships at Djerassi Resident Artists Program and the MacDowell Colony.

=== The Yellow House ===
Broom's first book The Yellow House, was published by Grove Press on August 13, 2019, following the publication of an early excerpt in the New Yorker in 2015.

In advance of its publication, Broom's debut memoir, The Yellow House, received positive attention from a number of outlets. In a pre-publication review, Dwight Garner of The New York Times wrote, "This is a major book that I suspect will come to be considered among the essential memoirs of this vexing decade." In The New York Times Book Review, Angela Flournoy called it “an instantly essential text.” Speaking of Broom in advance of The Yellow House's publication, novelist and Believer magazine co-founder Heidi Julavits remarked, "I already consider her to be one of America's most important and influential writers." The Star Tribune opined that Broom's book had “essentially told the story of black America in one fell swoop.” Other publications to declare the book's importance included Publishers Weekly and Kirkus Reviews. Quoting the book itself, Kirkus Reviews stated that The Yellow House reflected the author's attempt "to reckon with 'the psychic cost of defining oneself by the place where you are from,'" adding that "Broom's lyrical style celebrates her family bonds, but a righteous fury runs throughout the narrative at New Orleans' injustices, from the foundation on up." In advance of The Yellow House's publication, it had been listed as a notable book by The New York Times, Entertainment Weekly, Time, and the Washington Post, and further recommended by Ms., and author Lisa Taddeo, among others.

== Personal life ==
Broom lives in Harlem, New York with her wife Dee Rees.

== Accolades ==
- The Yellow House - 2019 National Book Award for Nonfiction

== Bibliography ==
- The Yellow House (2019)
