= Stanley Plumly =

American poet (1939–2019)

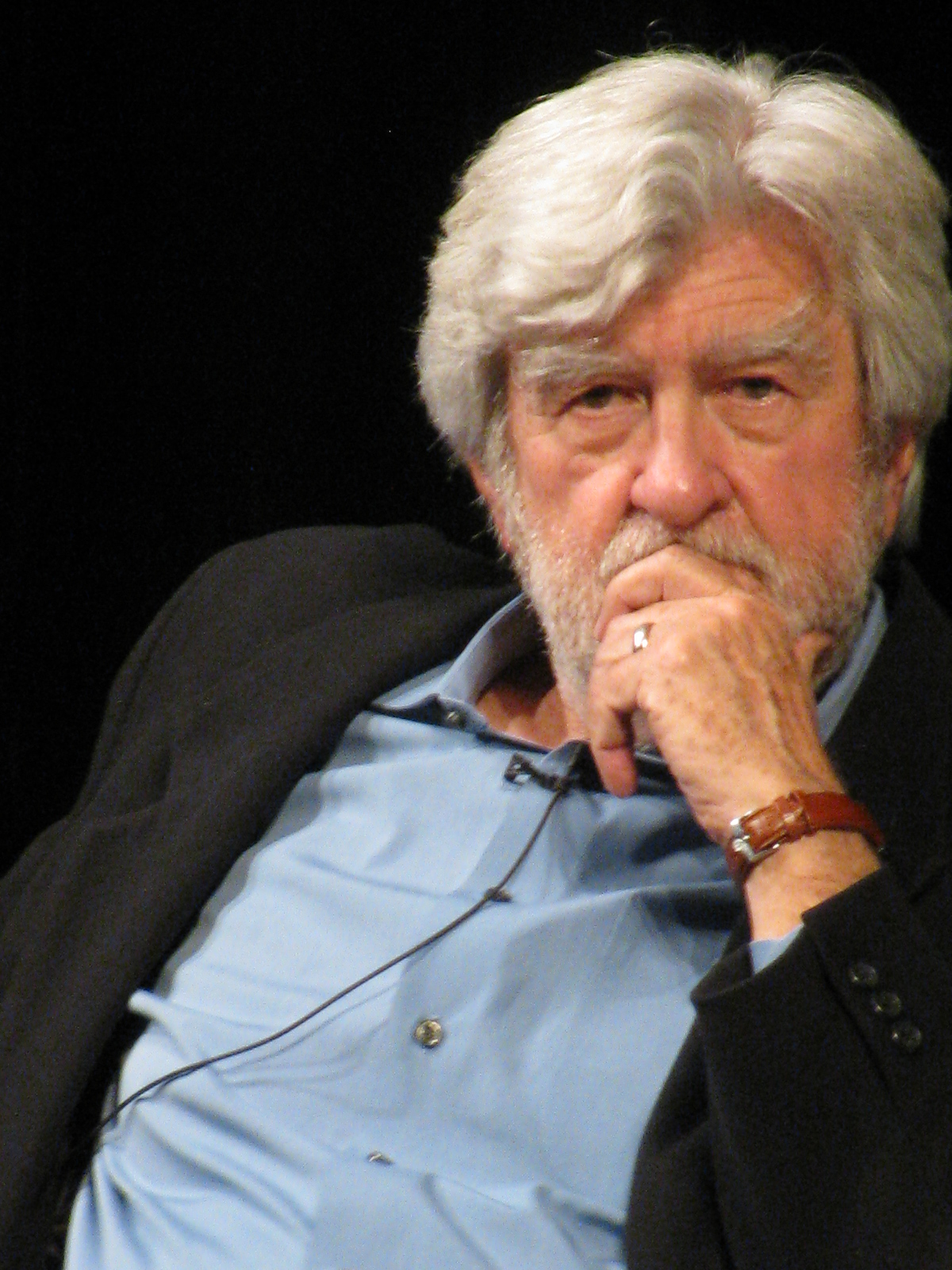
- Plumly in 2013
- Born: May 23, 1939; Barnesville, Ohio, U.S.
- Died: April 11, 2019 (aged 79); Frederick, Maryland, U.S.
- Education: Wilmington College; Ohio University
- Occupation: Professor
- Spouse: Margaret (Forian) Plumly
- Writing career
- Language: English
- Genre: Poetry

Stanley Plumly (May 23, 1939 – April 11, 2019) was an American poet and the director of University of Maryland, College Park's creative writing program.

== Biography ==
Plumly was born in Barnesville, Ohio in a working-class family with a farmland. He grew up in Ohio and Virginia. His working-class upbringing on farmland would feature heavily in his poetry and books. His upbringing was also influenced by Quakerism.

He graduated from Wilmington College in Ohio and taught for a number of years at Wilmington and at Ohio University, where he helped found The Ohio Review. He taught the writing program at the University of Maryland from 1985 to 2009. He was called "the most English American poet" and held Keats in high regard.

Plumly died on April 11, 2019, in Frederick, Maryland, at the age 79 of multiple myeloma.

== Bibliography ==
=== Poetry ===
==== Collections ====
- Plumly, Stanley (1970). In the outer dark : poems. Baton Rouge: Louisiana State UP.
- How the Plains Indians Got Horses (Best Cellar Press, 1973)
- Giraffe (Louisiana Press, 1974)
- Out-of-the-Body Travel (Ecco/Viking, 1977)
- Summer Celestial (Ecco/Norton, 1983)
- Plumly, Stanley (1989). Boy on the Step. New York: Ecco/Norton. ISBN 0-88001-228-5.
- Plumly, Stanley (1997). The Marriage in the Trees. Hopewell, NJ: Ecco Press. ISBN 0-88001-487-3.
- Plumly, Stanley (2000). Now that my father lies down beside me : new & selected poems, 1970 to 2000. New York: Ecco Press. ISBN 0-06-019659-9.
- Old Heart (W. W. Norton, 2007)
- Orphan Hours (W. W. Norton, 2012)
- Against Sunset (W. W. Norton, 2016)
- Middle Distance (W.W. Norton, 2020)

==== List of poems ====
- "The Crows at 3 A.M." The New Yorker. June 2, 2008.
- "Silent Heart Attack". The Atlantic Monthly. 292 (2): 116. September 2003.
- "Complaint Against the Arsonist". Virginia Quarterly Review. Summer 1992. Archived from the original on 2009-05-01.
- "Sickle". Ploughshares. Winter 1999. Archived from the original on January 17, 2016.
- "Samuel Scott's A Sunset, With a View of Nine Elms". Ploughshares. 1997–1999. Archived from the original on January 17, 2016.
- "Snipers". Ploughshares. Winter 1993–1994. Archived from the original on January 17, 2016.
- "Dwarf With Violin, Government Center Station". Ploughshares. Winter 1990–1991. Archived from the original on January 17, 2016.
- "Dark All Afternoon". Ploughshares. Summer 1980. Archived from the original on January 17, 2016.

Title	Year	First published	Reprinted/collected
Brownfields	2013	Plumly, Stanley (June 10–17, 2013). "Brownfields". The New Yorker. Vol. 89, no. 17. pp. 82–83.	

==== As editor ====
- Sebastian Matthews; Stanley Plumly, eds. (2005). Search Party: Collected Poems. Mariner Books. ISBN 0-618-56585-X.
- Michael Collier; Stanley Plumly, eds. (1999). The new Bread Loaf anthology of contemporary American poetry. UPNE. ISBN 978-0-87451-950-1.

=== Nonfiction ===
- Argument & song. Other Press, LLC. 2003. ISBN 978-1-59051-076-6.
- Posthumous Keats: A Personal Biography (W. W. Norton, 2008)
- The Immortal Evening: A Legendary Dinner With Keats, Wordsworth, and Lamb (W. W. Norton, 2014)
- Elegy Landscapes: Constable and Turner and the Intimate Sublime (W. W. Norton, 2018)

== Honors ==
- Poet Laureate for the State of Maryland
- Truman Capote Award for Literary Criticism, 2015
- John William Corrington Award for Lifetime Achievement in Literature, 2010
- Beall Award in Biography from PEN, 2009
- Paterson Poetry Prize, 2008
- LA Times Book Prize, 2008
- Delmore Schwartz Memorial Award, 1972
- Ingram Merrill Foundation Award
- Pushcart Prize on six occasions
- Academy Award in Literature from the American Academy of Arts and Letters
- John William Corrington Award for Literary Excellence

=== Fellowships ===
- Rockefeller Foundation Fellowship
- Ingram-Merrill Fellowship
- 1973 John Simon Guggenheim Fellowship
- National Endowment for the Arts Fellowship on three occasions
- 1991 poet in residence at The Frost Place
