= Controversy over fake artists on Spotify =

Controversy involving Spotify playlists

Since 2016, Spotify has faced accusations from numerous publications, such as Music Business Worldwide and Vulture Magazine, regarding their practice of commissioning tracks and listing them under fake names on their music platform. Some allege that the practice exists in order to reduce the amount of royalty payments distributed to real recording artists. In December 2024, the specific initiative of Perfect Fit Content (PFC) was revealed in a report by Liz Pelly, a music writer and critic whose internal investigation regarding the matter, titled "The Ghosts in the Machine", was published in Harper's Magazine. Other publications have also since raised concerns about the growing amount of generative artificial intelligence in Spotify's playlists and on the service writ large.

Spotify has routinely pushed back against allegations of creating "fake artists" for the sake of listing their music on playlists. With regard to PFC, they have cited user demand for background music and have denied their intention to scale up anonymously created tracks to supplant independent musicians. Regarding the increased appearance of artificial intelligence content on Spotify, the company does not yet have a policy regarding the practice of artificially generating music but has, in the past, acted against AI-generated tracks.

== Fake artists ==
=== 2016–2017: Music Business Worldwide reports ===
On August 31, 2016, Music Business Worldwide reported that Spotify, headed by Daniel Ek, was paying musicians "a flat fee" for tracks of various genres—such as "jazz, chill and peaceful piano playing"—to be listed under fabricated names. Although the publication was unable to report precisely which artists on the music platform were fake due to a disclosure agreement with "Multiple cast-iron sources", they revealed that they knew about "five Spotify-owned tracks that each have more than 500,000 streams—and one with over a million." At the time, the practice was seen as an "experiment, rather than a large-scale disruption of the platform's catalogues", but the publication raised concerns about "what effect a larger-scale version of this strategy may have on Spotify’s overall payment to recorded rights-holders—and where on its playlist map the trend might go next."

One year later, in July 2017, Vulture Magazine similarly reported that "Spotify is reportedly gaming the system by paying producers to produce songs that are then placed on the service’s massively popular playlists under the names of unknown, nonexistent artists." The publication stated that Spotify's flat fee provided to musicians for copyrighted music would be much less than the "fat streaming checks that come with... plum playlist placement" and therefore saw the alleged practice as a means by which Spotify could save costs on its own streaming, as Spotify's own curated playlists "are being listened to by half of the service’s users at any one time" and, according to Wired, are "the path forward" in terms of Spotify's unique angle and contribution on the music business. Shortly after, a spokesperson from Spotify refuted both Music Business Worldwide and Vulture Magazine's claims, stating the following:

We do not and have never created 'fake' artists and put them on Spotify playlists. Categorically untrue, full stop... We pay royalties—sound and publishing—for all tracks on Spotify, and for everything we playlist. We do not own rights, we're not a label, all our music is licensed from rightsholders and we pay them—we don't pay ourselves.

Shortly after, Music Business Worldwide reflected on their "widely-read story" from 2016 in light of Spotify's denial of "fake artists" allegations. The publication closely scrutinized Spotify's statement, pointing out that "amongst Spotify's indignant yet carefully-worded statement, you might have missed the bit where they deny that their service is littered with fake artists." To double down on their original allegations from 2016, the publication stated that they had contacted a musician in Europe who made a deal with the music platform to create tracks for fabricated artists which "were then included by Spotify on key genre-based playlists." In particular, the publication observed that it was strange for so many artists on the music platform to rack up millions of streams while having no documentation about who they were or who they worked with. They additionally stated that they were given a list of pseudonyms which "all existed, and they all boasted tracks with 500,000+ streams"; in total, they found that the cumulative streams of 50 fake artists totaled to over 520 million. Furthermore, they corroborated the "fake artists" allegations with other "senior sources in the industry" who showed no surprise and stated that the phenomenon "was now common practice, and was indeed a bid by the platform to drive down its licensing costs"; other sources pointed out that several cover song playlists were populated by productions from cheap companies and that plenty of such third parties have been involved much to the chagrin of actual music labels. In concluding their article, the publication disclosed a list of "Spotify's fake artists" with a total of 50 names.

At the end of the year, music writer David Turner analyzed data from Spotify's "Ambient Chill" playlist to investigate why actual ambient musicians like Brian Eno and Jon Hopkins were being substituted with stock music. There, he discovered that much of the stock music had been produced by Epidemic Sound, a company that hosts a catalog of stock music "often used in the background of advertisements, TV programs, and assorted video content." Around the same time, Pelly, a journalist and friend of Turner's, began reporting on music streaming services. During the summer, an "owner of an independent record label in New York" contacted her with a rumor that Spotify was populating its most-viewed playlists with "stock music attributed to pseudonymous musicians—variously called ghost or fake artists". In Harper's Magazine, she stated that several figures in the industry were starting to grow worried about the practice.

On December 4, 2017, Pelly published an essay in The Baffler titled "The Problem with Muzak" which posed the question: "How can artists distribute and sell their work in a digital economy beholden to ruthlessly commercial and centralized interests?" In her article, Pelly stated that Spotify posed a "danger" to the music business and, in particular, called out its algorithmic practices and playlists. She then went on to discuss how Spotify's "curated" playlists were more so created for the sake of providing "easy music" and "lean back listening" "to an audience of distracted, perhaps overworked, or anxious listeners whose stress-filled clicks now generate anesthetized, algorithmically designed playlists"; as a result, Pelly argued, actual musicians and labels were getting substituted by trend-driven, maximally profitable tracks.

=== 2017–2024: revived allegations by Swedish press and others ===
Between 2017 and 2022, the "fake artists" allegations died down, often giving way to other controversies suffered by Spotify, such as their 2019 deal with Joe Rogan. In 2022, however, the Swedish newspaper Dagens Nyheter discovered that approximately 20 musicians had been producing tracks for over 500 fabricated names on Spotify and named the production company Firefly Entertainment as a participant in the practice. In particular, they found 830 fake artists on Spotify and noted that 495 were placed on Spotify's curated playlists. They also identified Johan Röhr as a producer of over 2,700 songs listed under fake artists on the music platform. Around the same time, Svenska Dagbladet named Christer Sandelin and his record label, Chillmi, as responsible for creating "chill" tracks to be listed under fake artists since 2015; they reported that Chillmi's cumulative streams on Spotify totaled over 2 billion and counting.

In 2024, several publications continued to cover the phenomenon of "fake artists" on Spotify. In a Slate article, musician Rick Beato alleged that "Spotify itself is already in the game, slipping both real and A.I. songs into playlists and harvesting listens to keep a larger percent of the royalty pool for itself to maximize profits." However, it would not be until Pelly's report in December of that year when the actual initiative of Perfect Fit Content was discovered.

== Perfect Fit Content ==
In 2022, Pelly visited Dagens Nyheter in Sweden to learn more about their investigation into the "fake artists" allegations. From then on, she "spoke with former employees, reviewed internal Spotify records and company Slack messages, and interviewed and corresponded with numerous musicians" and discovered an "elaborate internal program" called Perfect Fit Content (PFC) where Spotify employees were directly tasked with taking commissioned music and listing it on their curated playlists. Pelly stated that PFC was a "troubling" practice for the music business, as it meant real musicians were getting supplanted financially by fake artists; artists who made hugely popular tracks for PFC could also find themselves not enjoying the royalties of their work.

Pelly speculated that PFC was created in 2017 in order to capitalize on the popularity of Spotify's curated playlists, which users were only listening to passively as a soundtrack, while not having to pay full royalties for each stream: "As a result, the thinking seemed to be: Why pay full-price royalties if users were only half listening? It was likely from this reasoning that the Perfect Fit Content program was created." A former Spotify employee told Pelly that as of 2017, playlist editors in the company could monitor analytics for "music commissioned to fit a certain playlist/mood with improved margins" and that those same playlist editors were pressured to populate Spotify's curated playlists with PFC tracks. Other former Spotify employees raised questions of transparency with Pelly, stating that users weren't in the know about PFC and that conversations couldn't be had internally either about the initiative. One employee told Pelly:

Some of us really didn’t feel good about what was happening... We didn’t like that it was these two guys that normally write pop songs replacing swaths of artists across the board. It’s just not fair. But it was like trying to stop a train that was already leaving.

Over time, Pelly reported, playlist editors hesitant about PFC became replaced by playlist editors who were more willing to be complacent about the initiative. Pelly found that, "By 2023, several hundred playlists were being monitored by the team responsible for PFC" including ambient, sleep, and focus playlists. Pelly also reported that whenever they were questioned about the initiative, Spotify's managers argued that such background tracks were in high demand by users anyway. When Harper's Magazine corresponded with Spotify for comment, Spotify denied that they were seeking to augment PFC and simply defended their PFC analytics tracking practices as mere data gathering typical for any company. Internal Slack messages, however, found that "PFC providers" were actively being prioritized for playlists; the list of PFC providers documented included Epidemic Sound and Firefly Entertainment along with others like Hush Hush LLC, Catfarm Music AB, QUeenstreet Content AB, and Industria Works.

In 2023, Pelly spoke with a jazz musician who had been producing music for one of Spotify's "PFC producers"; he stated that he was unaware of the broader practice taking place, stating that he was simply making "anonymous tracks for a production company that would distribute them on Spotify." He then described the process as 1) listening to old PFC playlists for reference, 2) writing charts for possible new PFC tracks to record, and 3) gathering several musicians for a record session to produce several tracks that would then be sent off to the PFC producer.

Pelly's report on PFC, titled "The Ghosts in the Machine" and published in Harper's Magazine, became an overnight sensation, spurring online discourse and receiving coverage from countless publications including Consequence of Sound, The Fader, NME, The A.V. Club, Futurism, and others. The article was an excerpt from her book Mood Machine: The Rise of Spotify and the Costs of the Perfect Playlist, which was released on January 7, 2025, by Astra House.

== Artificial intelligence ==
Pelly ended her Harper's Magazine article with a brief caution about artificial intelligence content. One former Spotify employee told her that AI could be used to augment the production of PFC even further.

Unrelated to PFC, several other publications have already reported the phenomenon of AI music on Spotify. In August 2024, Ed Newton-Rex, the former vice president of audio at Stability AI, stated that "There are multiple reports of [AI-generated music] being recommended to people". The same month, Futurism investigated the proliferation of AI-generated cover songs in various genres like country music. In September, a 52-year-old man named Michael Smith was charged with "wire fraud conspiracy, wire fraud, and money laundering conspiracy" after establishing a scheme to generate countless AI-generated tracks to list on Spotify and have them be listened to by bot accounts to quickly create royalty revenue. In November, The Verge criticized the emergence of AI slop on the music platform—ranging from AI-generated cover songs to AI-generated albums appearing on the pages of real recording artists—and traced many AI-generated tracks to a company called Ameritz Music. TechRadar, in covering Pelly's report, stated that Spotify's embrace of AI in light of the PFC revelation "starts to look a lot less fun: is the goal of AI really to improve your listening experience, or is it to stream the musical equivalent of crappy AI images?"

In 2023, Ek stated that AI-generated content could be a lucrative opportunity for the music business, and PFC producers like Epidemic Sound have stated their interest in taking advantage of AI generation to bolster its catalog of stock music. When asked about the prevalence of AI music on their service, Spotify stated that the company "does not have a policy against artists creating content using autotune or AI tools, as long as the content does not violate our other policies, including our deceptive content policy, which prohibits impersonation"; earlier, Spotify has allegedly taken action against AI artists, such as Sofia Pitcher.
