= Mood Machine =

2025 book by Liz Pelly

- Author: Liz Pelly
- Language: English
- Publisher: Hodder & Stoughton
- Publication date: 7 January 2025
- Publication place: United Kingdom
- ISBN: 978-1-399-71884-4

Mood Machine: The Rise of Spotify and the Costs of the Perfect Playlist is a 2025 book by Liz Pelly, a music journalist and adjunct professor at New York University, that critically examines the music streaming platform Spotify.

== Reception ==
The book was described as "a savage indictment of Spotify" in The Guardian, where it was featured as a "Book of the Day". The Daily Telegraph gave it 4 out of 5 stars, called it a "vital addition" to the writing about Spotify and other streaming technology, and said it "isn’t just a niche music-industry book: it asks much bigger questions about economic power, the value of art and the atomisation of society." Vulture said it "stands out as the definitive book on how we should think about Spotify as a phenomenon".
