= Liz Pelly =

American music journalist and author

- Born: 1990 (age 35–36)
- Education: Boston University
- Occupations: Music journalist; author; adjunct professor at New York University
- Notable work: Mood Machine (2025)
- Relatives: Jenn Pelly (twin sister)

Liz Pelly is an American writer, journalist, and adjunct professor at New York University. Her book Mood Machine: The Rise of Spotify and the Costs of the Perfect Playlist, which critically examines the music streaming platform Spotify including the platform's promotion of fake artists, was published in 2025 by Hodder & Stoughton.

== Early life and education ==
Pelly grew up on Long Island. She has a twin sister named Jenn, who is also a music journalist and writer. They both wrote about music for their high school newspaper.

Pelly started writing about music as a teenager for a local alt-weekly newspaper, before studying journalism at Boston University. While at university she was involved in college radio, which she says connected her "with the local music community and the underground scene".

== Career ==
After graduation, Pelly worked for The Boston Phoenix for its final two years where she covered "the Occupy movement and [...] local organizing efforts". In the mid-2010s, she lived at and was involved with running Silent Barn, a collectively run community art space in Brooklyn. Whilst living there she began researching Spotify, and started writing essays about streaming for the blog of a music nonprofit called CASH Music and then for The Baffler. In 2025 her first book, Mood Machine: The Rise of Spotify and the Costs of the Perfect Playlist, was published by Hodder & Stoughton. The book is a critical examination of Spotify including the platform's promotion of fake artists.

Pelly's writing has been published by The Guardian, NPR, Rolling Stone, Pitchfork, amongst others. She has appeared on radio shows and podcasts such as The New York Times Popcast, NPR's Morning Edition. She teaches in the recorded music program at New York University. She is the co-host of the Critical Listening podcast alongside music educator Max Alper.
