= Scheps =

Scheps may refer to:

People

- Andrew Scheps, US audio engineer
- Frida Scheps Weinstein, French author
- Gustavo Scheps, Uruguayan architect
- Ilja Scheps, German-Russian pianist
- Joëlle Scheps, Dutch swimmer
- Johan Scheps, Dutch politician
- Olga Scheps, German-Russian pianist
- Samuel Scheps, Polish-Swiss Zionist activist

Geography

- Scheps, a village in the Belgian municipality of Balen
- Scheps, a natural landscape in Belgian municipality of Balen

Other

- Scheps v Fine Art Logistics Ltd, a 2007 English contract law case
- Scheps, a Bavarian beer style
