= Pulitzer Prize for Biography =

American award for distinguished biographies

The Pulitzer Prize for Biography is one of the seven American Pulitzer Prizes annually awarded for Letters, Drama, and Music. The award honors "a distinguished and appropriately documented biography by an American author." Award winners receive US$15,000.

From 1917 to 2022, this prize was known as the Pulitzer Prize for Biography or Autobiography and was awarded to a distinguished biography, autobiography or memoir by an American author or co-authors, published during the preceding calendar year. It is one of the original Pulitzers. The program was inaugurated in 1917 with seven prizes, four of which were awarded that year.

== Recipients ==
In its first 97 years to 2013, the Biography Pulitzer was awarded 97 times. Two were given in 1938, and none in 1962.

=== 1910s–1940s ===
Pulitzer Prize for Biography or Autobiography winners, 1917–1949
Year	Author	Title	Ref.
1917	Laura E. Richards and Maud Howe Elliott, assisted by Florence Howe Hall	Julia Ward Howe	
1918	William Cabell Bruce	Benjamin Franklin, Self-Revealed	
1919	Henry Adams†	The Education of Henry Adams	
1920	Albert J. Beveridge	The Life of John Marshall, 4 vols.	
1921	Edward Bok	The Americanization of Edward Bok: The Autobiography of a Dutch Boy Fifty Years After	
1922	Hamlin Garland	A Daughter of the Middle Border	
1923	Burton J. Hendrick	The Life and Letters of Walter H. Page	
1924	Michael I. Pupin	From Immigrant to Inventor	
1925	M. A. De Wolfe Howe	Barrett Wendell and His Letters	
1926	Harvey Cushing	The Life of Sir William Osler, 2 vols.	
1927	Emory Holloway	Whitman	
1928	Charles Edward Russell	The American Orchestra and Theodore Thomas	
1929	Burton J. Hendrick	The Training of an American: The Earlier Life and Letters of Walter H. Page	
1930	Marquis James	The Raven: A Biography of Sam Houston	
1931	Henry James	Charles W. Eliot, President of Harvard University, 1869–1901	
1932	Henry F. Pringle	Theodore Roosevelt: A Biography	
1933	Allan Nevins	Grover Cleveland: A Study in Courage	
1934	Tyler Dennett	John Hay	
1935	Douglas S. Freeman	R. E. Lee	
1936	Ralph Barton Perry	The Thought and Character of William James	
1937	Allan Nevins	Hamilton Fish	
1938	Marquis James	The Life of Andrew Jackson, 2 vols.	
1938	Odell Shepard	Pedlar's Progress: The Life of Bronson Alcott	
1939	Carl Van Doren	Benjamin Franklin (Note: The 1939 jury shortlisted Elihu Root by Philip Jessup.)	
1940	Ray Stannard Baker	Woodrow Wilson, Life and Letters. Vols. VII and VIII (Note: The 1940 jury shortlisted Thoreau by Henry Seidel Canby.)	
1941	Ola Elizabeth Winslow	Jonathan Edwards, 1703–1758: A Biography	
1942	Forrest Wilson	Crusader in Crinoline: The Life of Harriet Beecher Stowe (Note: The 1942 jury ranked eventual winner Crusader in Crinoline: The Life of Harriet Beecher Stowe by Forrest Wilson as their second choice. Their unanimous first choice was Edgar Allan Poe: A Critical Biography by Arthur H. Quinn.)	
1943	Samuel Eliot Morison	Admiral of the Ocean Sea	
1944	Carleton Mabee	The American Leonardo: The Life of Samuel F. B. Morse (Note: The 1944 jury shortlisted Walt Whitman, an American: A Study in Biography by Henry Seidel Canby.)	
1945	Russel Blaine Nye	George Bancroft: Brahmin Rebel	
1946	Linnie Marsh Wolfe	Son of the Wilderness: The Life of John Muir (Note: The 1946 jury ranked eventual winner Son of the Wilderness: The Life of John Muir by Linnie Marsh Wolfe as their second choice. Their first choice was Soldier of Democracy by Kenneth S. Davis.)	
1947	William Allen White†	The Autobiography of William Allen White	
1948	Margaret Clapp	Forgotten First Citizen: John Bigelow (Note: The 1948 jury ranked eventual winner Forgotten First Citizen: John Bigelow by Margaret Clapp as their third choice. Their first choice was Thomas Jefferson, American Humanist by Karl Lehmann and their second choice was Wilson: The Road to the White House by Arthur S. Link.)	
1949	Robert E. Sherwood	Roosevelt and Hopkins (Note: The 1949 jury shortlisted, in order, George Washington, Vols. I and II by Douglas Southall Freeman (of which all four volumes would be awarded the prize in 1958), Jefferson the Virginian by Dumas Malone, James Madison: The Nationalist, 1780-1787 by Irving Brant and The Story of John Hope by Ridgely Torrence.)	

=== 1950s–1970s ===
Pulitzer Prize for Biography or Autobiography winners, 1950–1979
Year	Author	Title	Ref.
1950	Samuel Flagg Bemis	John Quincy Adams and the Foundations of American Foreign Policy (Note: The 1950 jury shortlisted, in order, This I Remember by Eleanor Roosevelt , John C. Calhoun: Nullifier, 1829-1839 by Charles M. Wiltse and Jonathan Edwards by Perry Miller.)	
1951	Margaret Louise Coit	John C. Calhoun: American Portrait (Note: The 1951 jury ranked eventual winner John C. Calhoun: American Portrait by Margaret Louise Coit as their third choice. Their first choice was James Madison: Father of the Constitution, 1787-1800 by Irving Brant and their second choice was Jane Mecom: The Favorite Sister of Benjamin Franklin by Carl Van Doren.)	
1952	Merlo J. Pusey	Charles Evans Hughes (Note: The 1952 jury shortlisted, in order, John C. Calhoun: Sectionalism 1840-1850 by Charles M. Wiltse, Jefferson and the Rights of Man by Dumas Malone, Zachary Taylor: Soldier in the White House by Holman Hamilton and Raymond of the Times by Francis Brown.)	
1953	David J. Mays	Edmund Pendleton 1721–1803 (Note: The 1953 jury shortlisted, in order, Sam Clemens of Hannibal by Dixon Wecter, John Adams and the Prophets of Progress by Zoltan Haraszti, Willkie: The Events He Was Part of, the Ideas He Fought For by Joseph Fels Barnes and A Scholar in Action: Edwin F. Gay by Herbert Heaton.)	
1954	Charles A. Lindbergh	The Spirit of St. Louis	
1955	William S. White	The Taft Story (Note: The eventual winner The Taft Story by William S. White was chosen by the Advisory Board and not mentioned in the 1955 jury report. The jury shortlisted, in order, Many a Good Crusade: Memoirs by Virginia Gildersleeve, George Washington, Vol. III by Douglas Southall Freeman (of which all four volumes would be awarded the prize in 1958), Beyond the Hundredth Meridian: John Wesley Powell and the Second Opening of the West by Wallace Stegner, Ford: The Times, the Man, the Company by Allan Nevins, God's Country and Mine: A Declaration of Love Spiced with a Few Harsh Words by Jacques Barzun, The Woman Within by Ellen Glasgow and From Missouri: An American Farmer Looks Back by Thad Snow.)	
1956	Talbot Faulkner Hamlin	Benjamin Henry Latrobe (Note: The 1956 jury shortlisted, in order, The Solitary Singer: A Critical Biography of Walt Whitman by Gay Wilson Allen, The Memoirs of Harry S. Truman, Vol. 1: The Year of Decisions by Harry S. Truman, Henry George by Charles Albro Barker, John Sloan: A Painter's Life by Van Wyck Brooks and Laurette by Marguerite Courtney.)	
1957	John F. Kennedy	Profiles in Courage (Note: The eventual winner Profiles in Courage by John F. Kennedy was chosen by the Advisory Board and not mentioned in the 1957 jury report. The jury shortlisted, in order, Harlan Fiske Stone: Pillar of the Law by Alpheus T. Mason, Roosevelt: The Lion and the Fox by James MacGregor Burns, James Madison: The President, 1809-1812 by Irving Brant and John Quincy Adams and the Union by Samuel Flagg Bemis.)	
1958	Douglas Southall Freeman† with John Alexander Carroll and Mary Wells Ashworth	George Washington, vols. I-VII (Note: The 1958 jury shortlisted, in order, Ford: Expansion and Challenge, 1915-1933 by Allan Nevins and Frank Ernest Hill, Albert Gallatin: Jeffersonian Financier and Diplomat by Raymond Walters Jr., Mr. Baruch by Margaret Coit and Master Roger Williams: A Biography by Ola Elizabeth Winslow.)	
1959	Arthur Walworth	Woodrow Wilson (Note: The 1959 jury shortlisted Henry Adams: The Middle Years by Ernest Samuels.)	
1960	Samuel Eliot Morison	John Paul Jones (Note: The 1960 jury ranked eventual winner John Paul Jones by Samuel Eliot Morison as their second choice. Their first choice In the Days of McKinley by Margaret Leech was awarded the Pulitzer Prize for History by the Advisory Board.)	
1961	David Donald	Charles Sumner and the Coming of the Civil War (Note: The 1961 jury shortlisted Louis Agassiz: A Life in Science by Edward Lurie.)	
1962	No award presented		
1963	Leon Edel	Henry James (Note: The 1963 jury shortlisted O'Neill by Arthur Gelb and Barbara Gelb, and John Adams by Page Smith.)	
1964	Walter Jackson Bate	John Keats (Note: The 1964 jury shortlisted The Letters of F. Scott Fitzgerald edited by Andrew Turnbull.)	
1965	Ernest Samuels	Henry Adams, 3 vols. (Note: The 1965 jury shortlisted The Three Worlds of Captain John Smith by Philip Lemont Barbour.)	
1966	Arthur M. Schlesinger, Jr.	A Thousand Days: John F. Kennedy in the White House (Note: The 1966 jury shortlisted The Autobiography of Van Wyck Brooks by Van Wyck Brooks, a compilation of three volumes that had been published in 1954, 1957 and 1961.)	
1967	Justin Kaplan	Mr. Clemens and Mark Twain (Note: The 1967 jury shortlisted, in order, James Russell Lowell by Martin Duberman, Robert Frost: The Early Years, 1874-1915 by Lawrance Thompson and James Boswell: The Earlier Years, 1740-1769 by Frederick A. Pottle.)	
1968	George F. Kennan	Memoirs (Note: The 1968 jury shortlisted, in order, William James by Gay Wilson Allen, Woodrow Wilson: The Academic Years by Henry Bragdon, "Old Bruin": Commodore Matthew Calbraith Perry, 1794-1858 by Matthew C. Perry and William Henry Seward by Glyndon G. Van Deusen.)	
1969	Benjamin Lawrence Reid	The Man from New York: John Quinn and His Friends (Note: The 1969 jury was split with two jurors favoring eventual winner The Man from New York: John Quinn and His Friends by Benjamin Lawrence Reid, while the remaining juror favored Harvard Graduates Vol. 14, the Classes of 1756–1760 by Clifford K. Shipton.)	
1970	Thomas Harry Williams	Huey Long	
1971	Lawrance Thompson	Robert Frost: The Years of Triumph, 1915–1938 (Note: The 1971 jury shortlisted, in order, Roosevelt: The Soldier of Freedom, 1940-1945 by James MacGregor Burns and George Washington and the New Nation, 1783-1793 by James Thomas Flexner.)	
1972	Joseph P. Lash	Eleanor and Franklin	
1973	W. A. Swanberg	Luce and His Empire	
1974	Louis Sheaffer	O'Neill, Son and Artist	
1975	Robert Caro	The Power Broker: Robert Moses and the Fall of New York	
1976	R. W. B. Lewis	Edith Wharton: A Biography (Note: The 1976 jury shortlisted Mary Cassatt by Nancy Hale, Lamy of Santa Fe by Paul Horgan (which won the Pulitzer Prize for History), Steinbeck: A Life in Letters edited by Elaine Anderson Steinbeck and Robert Wallsten, and All the Strange Hours: The Excavation of a Life by Loren Eiseley.)	
1977	John E. Mack	A Prince of Our Disorder: The Life of T. E. Lawrence	
1978	Walter Jackson Bate	Samuel Johnson	
1979	Leonard Baker	Days of Sorrow and Pain: Leo Baeck and the Berlin Jews (Note: The 1979 jury shortlisted, in order, Dorothea Lange by Milton Meltzer, Bloody Mary: The Life of Mary Tudor by Carolly Erickson, Cervantes: A Biography by William Byron, The Last Romantic: A Life of Max Eastman by William L. O'Neill and Samuel Beckett: A Biography by Deirdre Bair.)	

=== 1980s ===
Entries from this point on include the finalists listed after the winner for each year.

Pulitzer Prize for Biography or Autobiography winners and finalists, 1980–1989
Year	Author	Title	Result	Ref.
1980	Edmund Morris	The Rise of Theodore Roosevelt	Winner	
1980	Ernest Samuels	Bernard Berenson, The Making of a Connoisseur	Finalist	
1980	Meryle Secrest	Being Bernard Berenson	Finalist	
1980	Geoffrey Wolff	The Duke of Deception	Finalist	
1981	Robert K. Massie	Peter the Great: His Life and World	Winner	
1981	Justin Kaplan	Walt Whitman: A Life	Finalist	
1981	Ronald Steel	Walter Lippmann and the American Century	Finalist	
1982	William S. McFeely	Grant: A Biography	Winner	
1982	Gay Wilson Allen	Waldo Emerson	Finalist	
1982	David McCullough	Mornings on Horseback	Finalist	
1983	Russell Baker	Growing Up	Winner	
1983	Ted Morgan	Churchill: Young Man in a Hurry, 1874–1915	Finalist	
1983	Richard Norton Smith	Thomas E. Dewey and His Times	Finalist	
1984	Louis R. Harlan	Booker T. Washington: The Wizard of Tuskegee, 1901–1915	Winner	
1984	Fred Kaplan	Thomas Carlyle: A Biography	Finalist	
1984	Kenneth Manning	Black Apollo of Science: The Life of Ernest Everett Just	Finalist	
1985	Kenneth Silverman	The Life and Times of Cotton Mather	Winner	
1985	Howard M. Feinstein	Becoming William James	Finalist	
1985	Michael Mott	The Seven Mountains of Thomas Merton	Finalist	
1986	Elizabeth Frank	Louise Bogan: A Portrait	Winner	
1986	John Hope Franklin	George Washington Williams: A Biography	Finalist	
1986	Frida Scheps Weinstein	A Hidden Childhood: A Jewish Girl's Sanctuary in a French Convent, 1942–1945	Finalist	
1987	David J. Garrow	Bearing The Cross: Martin Luther King Jr. and the Southern Christian Leadership Conference	Winner	
1987	Joseph Frank	Dostoevsky: The Stir of Liberation, 1860–1865	Finalist	
1987	Leonard L. Richards	The Life and Times of Congressman John Quincy Adams	Finalist	
1987	A.M. Sperber	Murrow: His Life and Times	Finalist	
1988	David Herbert Donald	Look Homeward: A Life of Thomas Wolfe	Winner	
1988	Kenneth S. Lynn	Hemingway	Finalist	
1988	John Owen McCormick	George Santayana: A Biography	Finalist	
1989	Richard Ellmann†	Oscar Wilde	Winner	
1989	Peter Gay	Freud: A Life for Our Time	Finalist	
1989	Arnold Rampersad	The Life of Langston Hughes: Volume II, 1941–1967: I Dream a World	Finalist	
1989	Neil Sheehan	A Bright Shining Lie: John Paul Vann and America in Vietnam	Finalist	

=== 1990s ===
Pulitzer Prize for Biography or Autobiography winners and finalists, 1990–1999
Year	Author(s)	Title	Result	Ref.
1990	Sebastian de Grazia	Machiavelli in Hell	Winner	
1990	Jill Ker Conway	The Road from Coorain	Finalist	
1990	Reynolds Price	Clear Pictures: First Loves, First Guides	Finalist	
1990	Geoffrey C. Ward	A First-Class Temperament: The Emergence of Franklin Roosevelt	Finalist	
1991	Steven Naifeh and Gregory White Smith	Jackson Pollock: An American Saga	Winner	
1991	Patricia O'Toole	The Five of Hearts: An Intimate Portrait of Henry Adams and His Friends 1880–1918	Finalist	
1991	Joseph Frazier Wall	Alfred I. Du Pont: The Man and His Family	Finalist	
1992	Lewis B. Puller	Fortunate Son: The Autobiography of Lewis B. Puller Jr.	Winner	
1992	William S. McFeely	Frederick Douglass	Finalist	
1992	Michael Shelden	Orwell: The Authorized Biography	Finalist	
1993	David McCullough	Truman	Winner	
1993	James Gleick	Genius: The Life and Science of Richard Feynman	Finalist	
1993	Walter Isaacson	Kissinger: A Biography	Finalist	
1994	David Levering Lewis	W. E. B. Du Bois: Biography of a Race, 1868–1919	Winner	
1994	Deborah Baker	In Extremis: The Life of Laura Riding	Finalist	
1994	Edmund White	Genet: A Biography	Finalist	
1995	Joan D. Hedrick	Harriet Beecher Stowe: A Life	Winner	
1995	Roger K. Newman	Hugo Black: A Biography	Finalist	
1995	Stacy Schiff	Saint-Exupery: A Biography	Finalist	
1996	Jack Miles	God: A Biography	Winner	
1996	John Loughery	John Sloan: Painter and Rebel	Finalist	
1996	Maynard Solomon	Mozart: A Life	Finalist	
1997	Frank McCourt	Angela's Ashes: A Memoir	Winner	
1997	Kim Barnes	In the Wilderness: Coming of Age in Unknown Country	Finalist	
1997	Hershel Parker	Herman Melville: A Biography, Volume 1, 1819–1851	Finalist	
1998	Katharine Graham	Personal History	Winner	
1998	James H. Jones	Alfred C. Kinsey: A Public-Private Life	Finalist	
1998	Sam Tanenhaus	Whittaker Chambers: A Biography	Finalist	
1999	A. Scott Berg	Lindbergh	Winner	
1999	Francine du Plessix Gray	At Home with the Marquis de Sade: A Life	Finalist	
1999	Sylvia Nasar	A Beautiful Mind	Finalist	

=== 2000s ===
Pulitzer Prize for Biography or Autobiography winners and finalists, 2000–2009
Year	Author(s)	Title	Result
2000	Stacy Schiff	Vera, Mrs. Vladimir Nabokov	Winner
2000	Bobbie Ann Mason	Clear Springs: A Memoir	Finalist
2000	Dava Sobel	Galileo's Daughter: A Historical Memoir of Science, Faith, and Love	Finalist
2001	David Levering Lewis	W. E. B. Du Bois: The Fight for Equality and the American Century 1919-1963	Winner
2001	H.W. Brands	The First American: The Life and Times of Benjamin Franklin	Finalist
2001	Christoph Wolff	Johann Sebastian Bach: The Learned Musician	Finalist
2002	David McCullough	John Adams	Winner
2002	Jimmy Carter	An Hour Before Daylight: Memories of a Rural Boyhood	Finalist
2002	Jean Edward Smith	Grant	Finalist
2003	Robert Caro	Master of the Senate: The Years of Lyndon Johnson	Winner
2003	Nicholas Dawidoff	The Fly Swatter: A Portrait of an Exceptional Character	Finalist
2003	Lewis Lockwood	Beethoven: The Music and the Life	Finalist
2004	William Taubman	Khrushchev: The Man and His Era	Winner
2004	James Gleick	Isaac Newton	Finalist
2004	Hayden Herrera	Arshile Gorky: His Life and Work	Finalist
2005	Mark Stevens and Annalyn Swan	de Kooning: An American Master	Winner
2005	Stephen Greenblatt	Will in the World: How Shakespeare Became Shakespeare	Finalist
2005	William Souder	Under a Wild Sky: John James Audubon and the Making of The Birds of America	Finalist
2006	Kai Bird and Martin J. Sherwin	American Prometheus: The Triumph and Tragedy of J. Robert Oppenheimer	Winner
2006	Joan Didion	The Year of Magical Thinking	Finalist
2006	Megan Marshall	The Peabody Sisters: Three Women Who Ignited American Romanticism	Finalist
2007	Debby Applegate	The Most Famous Man in America: The Biography of Henry Ward Beecher	Winner
2007	Arthur H. Cash	John Wilkes: The Scandalous Father of Civil Liberty	Finalist
2007	David Nasaw	Andrew Carnegie	Finalist
2008	John Matteson	Eden's Outcasts: The Story of Louisa May Alcott and Her Father	Winner
2008	Martin Duberman	The Worlds of Lincoln Kirstein	Finalist
2008	Zachary Leader	The Life of Kingsley Amis	Finalist
2009	Jon Meacham	American Lion: Andrew Jackson in the White House	Winner
2009	H.W. Brands	Traitor to His Class: The Privileged Life and Radical Presidency of Franklin Delano Roosevelt	Finalist
2009	Steve Coll	The Bin Ladens: An Arabian Family in the American Century	Finalist

=== 2010s ===
Pulitzer Prize for Biography or Autobiography winners and finalists, 2010–2019
Year	Author(s)	Title	Result	Ref.
2010	T. J. Stiles	The First Tycoon: The Epic Life of Cornelius Vanderbilt	Winner	
2010	Blake Bailey	Cheever: A Life	Finalist	
2010	John Milton Cooper, Jr.	Woodrow Wilson: A Biography	Finalist	
2011	Ron Chernow	Washington: A Life	Winner	
2011	Alan Brinkley	The Publisher: Henry Luce and His American Century	Finalist	
2011	Michael O'Brien	Mrs. Adams in Winter: A Journey in the Last Days of Napoleon	Finalist	
2012	John Lewis Gaddis	George F. Kennan: An American Life	Winner	
2012	Mary Gabriel	Love and Capital: Karl and Jenny Marx and the Birth of a Revolution	Finalist	
2012	Manning Marable	Malcolm X: A Life of Reinvention	Finalist	
2013	Tom Reiss	The Black Count: Glory, Revolution, Betrayal, and the Real Count of Monte Cristo	Winner	
2013	Michael Gorra	Portrait of a Novel: Henry James and the Making of an American Masterpiece	Finalist	
2013	David Nasaw	The Patriarch: The Remarkable Life and Turbulent Times of Joseph P. Kennedy	Finalist	
2014	Megan Marshall	Margaret Fuller: A New American Life	Winner	
2014	Leo Damrosch	Jonathan Swift: His Life and His World	Finalist	
2014	Jonathan Sperber	Karl Marx: A Nineteenth-Century Life	Finalist	
2015	David I. Kertzer	The Pope and Mussolini: The Secret History of Pius XI and the Rise of Fascism in Europe	Winner	
2015	Thomas Brothers	Louis Armstrong: Master of Modernism	Finalist	
2015	Stephen Kotkin	Stalin: Paradoxes of Power, 1878–1928	Finalist	
2016	William Finnegan	Barbarian Days: A Surfing Life	Winner	
2016	Elizabeth Alexander	The Light of the World: A Memoir	Finalist	
2016	T. J. Stiles	Custer's Trials: A Life on the Frontier of a New America	Finalist	
2017	Hisham Matar	The Return: Fathers, Sons and the Land in Between	Winner	
2017	Susan Faludi	In the Darkroom	Finalist	
2017	Paul Kalanithi	When Breath Becomes Air	Finalist	
2018	Caroline Fraser	Prairie Fires: The American Dreams of Laura Ingalls Wilder	Winner	
2018	John A. Farrell	Richard Nixon: The Life	Finalist	
2018	Kay Redfield Jamison	Robert Lowell, Setting the River on Fire: A Study of Genius, Mania, and Character	Finalist	
2019	Jeffrey C. Stewart	The New Negro: The Life of Alain Locke	Winner	
2019	Max Boot	The Road Not Taken: Edward Lansdale and the American Tragedy in Vietnam	Finalist	
2019	Caroline Weber	Proust's Duchess: How Three Celebrated Women Captured the Imagination of Fin-de-Siècle Paris	Finalist	

=== 2020s ===
Pulitzer Prize for Biography or Autobiography winners and finalists, 2020–present
Year	Author(s)	Work	Result	Ref
2020	Benjamin Moser	Sontag: Her Life and Work	Winner	
2020	George Packer	Our Man: Richard Holbrooke and the End of the American Century	Finalist	
2020	Deirdre Bair	Parisian Lives: Samuel Beckett, Simone de Beauvoir, and Me	Finalist	
2021	Les Payne† and Tamara Payne	The Dead Are Arising: The Life of Malcolm X	Winner	
2021	Heather Clark	Red Comet: The Short Life and Blazing Art of Sylvia Plath	Finalist	
2021	Amy Stanley	Stranger in the Shogun's City: A Japanese Woman and Her World	Finalist	
2022	Winfred Rembert† and Erin I. Kelly	Chasing Me to My Grave: An Artist's Memoir of the Jim Crow South	Winner	
2022	Richard Zenith	Pessoa: A Biography	Finalist	
2022	Janice P. Nimura	The Doctors Blackwell: How Two Pioneering Sisters Brought Medicine to Women and Women to Medicine	Finalist	
2023	Beverly Gage	G-Man: J. Edgar Hoover and the Making of the American Century	Winner	
2023	Jennifer Homans	Mr. B: George Balanchine's 20th Century	Finalist	
2023	Robert Samuels and Toluse Olorunnipa	His Name Is George Floyd: One Man's Life and the Struggle for Racial Justice	Finalist	
2024	Jonathan Eig	King: A Life	Winner	
2024	Ilyon Woo	Master Slave Husband Wife: An Epic Journey from Slavery to Freedom	Winner	
2024	Tracy Daugherty	Larry McMurtry: A Life	Finalist	
2025	Jason Roberts	Every Living Thing: The Great and Deadly Race to Know All Life	Winner	
2025	David Greenberg	John Lewis: A Life	Finalist	
2025	Amy Reading	The World She Edited: Katharine S. White at The New Yorker	Finalist	
2026	Amanda Vaill	Pride and Pleasure: The Schuyler Sisters in an Age of Revolution	Winner	
2026	James McWilliams	The Life and Poetry of Frank Stanford	Finalist	
2026	Lance Richardson	True Nature: The Pilgrimage of Peter Matthiessen	Finalist	

== Repeat winners ==
Ten people have won the Pulitzer for Biography or Autobiography twice:

- Burton J. Hendrick, 1923, 1929
- Allan Nevins, 1933, 1937
- Marquis James, 1930, 1938
- Douglas S. Freeman, 1935, 1958
- Samuel Eliot Morison, 1943, 1960
- Walter Jackson Bate, 1964, 1978
- David Herbert Donald, 1961, 1988
- David Levering Lewis, 1994, 2001
- David McCullough, 1993, 2002
- Robert Caro, 1975, 2003

W. A. Swanberg was selected by the Pulitzer board in 1962 and 1973; however, the trustees of Columbia University (then responsible for conferral of the awards) overturned the proposed 1962 prize for Citizen Hearst.

== See also ==
- Pulitzer Prize for History
