= Linnie Marsh Wolfe =

American librarian (1881–1945)

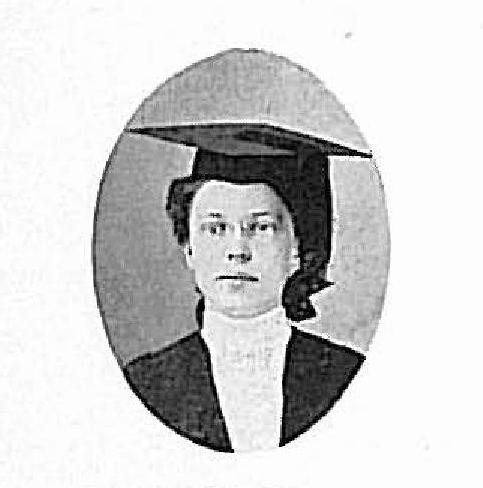
- Wolfe in 1906
- Born: January 8, 1881; Big Rapids, Michigan, US
- Died: September 15, 1945 (aged 64); Berkeley, California, US
- Education: Whitman College; Radcliffe College; University of Southern California
- Works: Son of the Wilderness: The Life of John Muir
- Awards: Pulitzer Prize for Biography or Autobiography

Linnie Marsh Wolfe (January 8, 1881 – September 15, 1945) was an American librarian. She won the 1946 Pulitzer Prize for Biography or Autobiography for her 1945 biography of John Muir titled Son of the Wilderness: The Life of John Muir (New York: A. A. Knopf, 1945).

== Biography ==
Linnie Marsh was born in Big Rapids, Michigan. She graduated from Whitman College with an A.B. and Radcliffe College with an A.M. in 1907. She also graduated from the University of Southern California library school and was a student at the University of Washington and the University of California. She worked as a teacher in Washington and a librarian in public libraries and high schools in Los Angeles, California. In 1924, she married Roy Wolfe. They had no children.

While working as a librarian, Wolfe gained an interest in the work of naturalist author John Muir. She organized trips for schoolchildren to Muir's home, spoke about him on the radio, and became secretary of the John Muir Association. Some of Muir's journals had been previously published by William Frederic Bade and Wolfe was asked to edit Muir's unpublished journals and notes. She completed the work, John of the Mountains: The Unpublished Journals of John Muir, published by A. A. Knopf in 1938, after which Alfred A. Knopf, Sr. asked her to write a biography of Muir. Wolfe interviewed Muir's daughters and other family members and associates. Son of the Wilderness: The Life of John Muir was published by Knopf in May 1945. Reviews were mixed, and Wolfe was criticized for "haphazard" documentation and a lack of critical judgement. The Muir biographer and environmental historian Donald Worster notes that Wolfe's biography is largely based on her interviews, which were unrecorded and seem "embellished for dramatic effect". Char Miller criticized Wolfe for including a conversation between Muir and Gifford Pinchot for which no documentary evidence appears to exist. The book is required reading for rangers and volunteers at the John Muir National Historic Site.

Wolfe died in a Berkeley, California, nursing home. She did not live to receive her Pulitzer Prize in May 1946.
