= Ernest Samuels =

American biographer

Ernest Samuels (May 19, 1903 in Chicago, Illinois – February 12, 1996 in Evanston, Illinois) was an American university professor and scholar of American literature. He spent his career at Northwestern University and is best known for his biography of Henry Adams, which won several major prizes.

== Life ==
Born in Chicago, he received his Ph.B. in 1923 and J.D. in 1926 from the University of Chicago. He moved to the southwest to recover from tuberculosis, staying in that part of the country and practicing law in El Paso, Texas. He then moved back to Chicago, switching to literature and earning an M.A. in English from the University of Chicago in 1931. During the Depression years 1931-1937 he practiced law in Chicago and taught business English at Bryant & Stratton Business College, for which he wrote a textbook. From 1937 to 1939 he was an instructor in English at the State College of Washington, now Washington State University, where he met and married Jayne Newcomer. In 1942 he completed a Ph.D. in English at the University of Chicago with a dissertation on "The Early Career of Henry Adams." He then began teaching English at Northwestern University, where he was Franklin Bliss Snyder Professor, and, reluctantly, department chair from 1964 to 1966. With the exception of a visiting professorship at the University of Southern California in 1966–67, he remained at Northwestern for the rest of his teaching career, retiring in 1971.

Samuels is best known for his 3-volume biography of Henry Adams (1948, 1958, 1964), for which he received the Parkman Prize, the Bancroft Prize, and the 1965 Pulitzer Prize for Biography or Autobiography, and he was a principal editor of the six-volume collection of the letters of Henry Adams (1982, 1988). After retiring from teaching he took on a new project, which culminated in a two-volume biography of Bernard Berenson (1979, 1987), the art connoisseur and dealer who established standards of taste and commercial value. Samuels' volume is considered "the most authoritative and comprehensive" study of the man and his career. The first volume was a finalist for a National Book Award.

A colleage recalled him as "a friendly man, always the gentleman and always willing to help." He composed his work on an "ancient portable typewriter," and in good weather rode his bicycle to campus from his home in north Evanston.

His wife, Jayne Newcomer Samuels, assisted with most of his publications. After they spent a year together at I Tatti, researching the Berenson archives, she co-edited Mary Berenson: A Self-Portrait from Her Diaries and Letters (1980) with Barbara Strachey, Mary Berenson's granddaughter.

Ernest and Jayne Samuels both died in Evanston, Illinois, Ernest in 1996 and Jayne in 2013. They had two daughters, Susanna (Epp) and Elizabeth, and a son, Jonathan.

== Works ==
=== Articles and reviews ===
- Samuels, Ernest. “Henry Adams and Bernard Berenson: Two Boston Exiles.” Proceedings of the Massachusetts Historical Society, vol. 95, 1983, pp. 100–13. JSTOR, http://www.jstor.org/stable/25080926. Accessed 19 June 2025.
- Samuels, Ernest. “Confessions of a Biographer.” The Quarterly Journal of the Library of Congress 38, no. 1 (1981): 34–41. http://www.jstor.org/stable/29781882.

=== Books ===
- Samuels, Ernest, The Young Henry Adams (Harvard University Press, 1948)
- Samuels, Ernest, Henry Adams: The Middle Years (Harvard University Press, 1958)
- Samuels, Ernest, Henry Adams: The Major Phase (Harvard University Press, 1964)
- Samuels, Ernest, Henry Adams (Harvard University Press, 1989) (Abridgement of three above biographies)
- Samuels, Ernest, Bernard Berenson: The Making of a Connoisseur (Harvard University Press, 1979)
- Samuels, Ernest, with the collaboration of Jayne Newcomer Samuels, Bernard Berenson: The Making of a Legend (Harvard University Press, 1987)
- Adams, Henry, The Letters of Henry Adams (6 vols.) (Belknap Press, 1982, 1988) (eds.: J.C. Levenson, Ernest Samuels, Charles Vandersee, Viola Winner)
- Adams, Henry, Henry Adams: Selected Letters (Harvard University Press, 1992) (ed. Ernest Samuels)

== Sources ==
- Bittner, David Professor Ernest Samuels: Pioneering Jewish Educator who "Broke the Back" of Academic Elitism (Western States Jewish History, Fall 2013, Vol. 46 Issue 1)
- Leopold, Richard W. (1996). "Ernest Samuels". Proceedings of the Massachusetts Historical Society. 108: 157–159. JSTOR 25081120.
