= T. J. Stiles =

American biographer (born 1964)

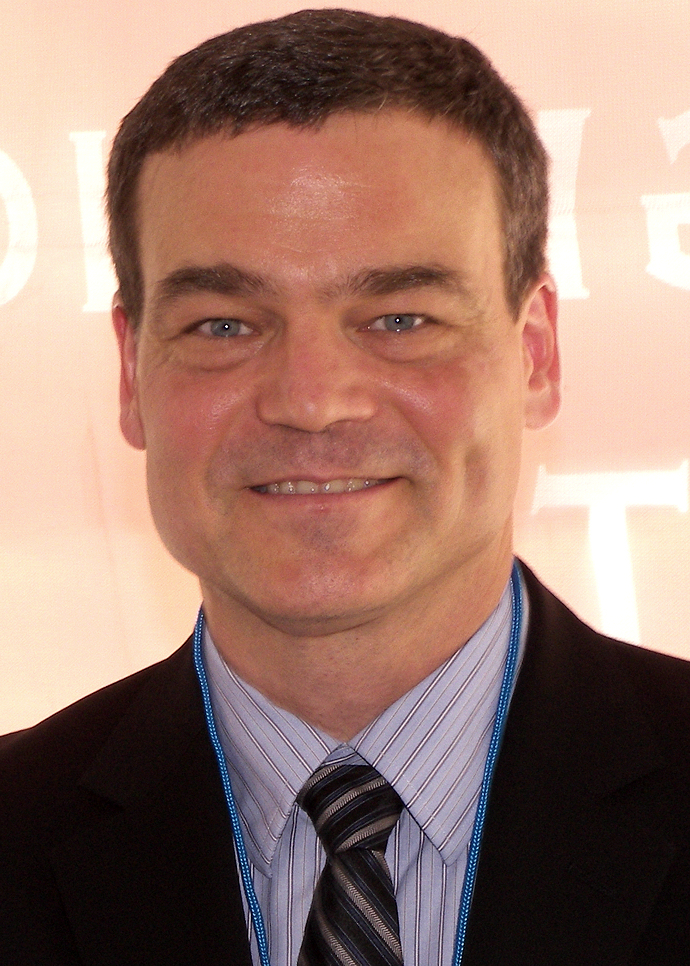
- T. J. Stiles at the 2010 Texas Book Festival.
- Born: 1964 (age 61–62); Foley, Minnesota
- Education: Carleton College (BA); Columbia University (MA, MPhil)
- Writing career
- Genre: Biography
- Subjects: American Civil War, American frontier
- Notable awards: 2016 Pulitzer Prize for History, 2009 National Book Award for Nonfiction, 2010 Pulitzer Prize for Biography

T. J. Stiles (born 1964) is an American biographer who lives in Berkeley, California. His book The First Tycoon: The Epic Life of Cornelius Vanderbilt (New York: Alfred A. Knopf, 2009) won a National Book Award and the 2010 Pulitzer Prize for Biography or Autobiography. His book Custer's Trials: A Life on the Frontier of a New America received the 2016 Pulitzer Prize for History.

== Background ==
Stiles was born and raised in Foley, Minnesota, a rural farming community. He graduated from Carleton College in Northfield, Minnesota with Distinction in History, and received a fellowship to study European history at Columbia University in New York City. After receiving a Master of Arts and a Master of Philosophy, he took a position in publishing at Oxford University Press.

== Early publications ==
In the 1990s, Stiles edited a series of anthologies of primary sources on American history. These included The Citizen's Handbook (New York: Berkley Publishing Group, 1994); In Their Own Words: Civil War Commanders (New York: Perigee Books, 1995), In Their Own Words: Warriors and Pioneers (New York: Perigee Books, 1996), In Their Own Words: Robber Barons and Radicals (New York: Perigee Books, 1997), In Their Own Words: The Colonizers (New York: Perigee Books, 1998), and In Their Own Words: Founding Fathers (New York: Perigee Books, 1999), later republished as The American Revolution. Stiles also wrote for periodicals, authoring pieces for Smithsonian, Denver Post, and the Los Angeles Times.

== Biographies ==
=== Jesse James: Last Rebel of the Civil War ===
In 2002, Stiles published Jesse James: Last Rebel of the Civil War (New York: Alfred A. Knopf, 2002). This was a widely noted reassessment of the legendary outlaw, focusing on his life and historical role, rather than his folk-culture status. Stiles argued that Jesse James won political support by depicting himself as a Confederate avenger after the Civil War, as opposed to the traditional notion that he was an anti-railroad Robin Hood figure.

The book received a cover review in The New York Times Book Review, and was favorably reviewed by many other publications in the United States and abroad. Jesse James: Last Rebel of the Civil War was named a New York Times Notable Book, a finalist for the Los Angeles Times Book Prize for Biography, one of the Five Best Books of the Year by the London Sunday Times, an American Library Association Notable Book, one of the New York Public Library's 25 Books to Remember, and a Best Book of the Year by Library Journal, the Chicago Sun-Times, the Cleveland Plain Dealer, Bookpage, and the London Independent. It also won the English-Speaking Union's Ambassador Book Award, the Peter Seaborg Award for Civil War Scholarship, the James-Younger Gang's Perry Award, and the Friends of the James Farm's John Newman Edwards Award.

=== The First Tycoon: The Epic Life of Cornelius Vanderbilt ===
In 2009, after seven years of work, Stiles published his second biography The First Tycoon: The Epic Life of Cornelius Vanderbilt (New York: Alfred A. Knopf, 2009). This massive study was the first comprehensive account of the life of "Commodore" Cornelius Vanderbilt, the nineteenth-century shipping and railroad mogul, financial backer of Vanderbilt University, and founder of the Gilded Age Vanderbilt dynasty. This book was also widely and very favorably reviewed. It went on to win the 2009 National Book Award for Nonfiction and the 2010 Pulitzer Prize for Biography. It was also named a New York Times Notable Book and one of the best books of the year by The New Yorker, the Financial Times, the Christian Science Monitor, the Boston Globe, the Philadelphia Inquirer, and other publications.

=== Custer's Trials: A Life on the Frontier of a New America ===
Stiles next released a biography of George Armstrong Custer, Custer's Trials: A Life on the Frontier of a New America (New York: Alfred A. Knopf, 2015), a study of the popular federal cavalry general in the American Civil War who famously died at the hands of Lakota, Cheyenne, and allied Native American forces in 1876. Writing in the Boston Globe, Matthew Price found it to be "a biography of stunning richness and sophistication . . . [that] turns the focus squarely on Custer and away from the grim terminus that has defined his legacy." Thomas Powers remarked in the New York Review of Books that Stiles's relegation of the Battle of Little Bighorn to the epilogue "is about the boldest purely literary decision I’ve seen in a long while, and the effect is startling." The book has been named a finalist for the National Book Critics Circle Award for Biography and for the Guggenheim-Lehrman Prize in Military History. It received the 2016 Pulitzer Prize for History. It was also a finalist for the 2016 Pulitzer Prize for Biography or Autobiography.

== Fellowships and other awards ==
Stiles is a member of the Society of American Historians. In 2011, Stiles received a Guggenheim Fellowship. From 2004 to 2005, Stiles held the Gilder Lehrman Fellowship in American History at the Dorothy and Lewis B. Cullman Center for Scholars and Writers at the New York Public Library. He has also received a Distinguished Alumni Award from Carleton College. In 2019, Stiles received the Golden Plate Award of the American Academy of Achievement presented by Awards Council member Rick Atkinson.

== Other writings, appearances, and professional positions ==
Stiles has published numerous reviews and essays. He has written for the New York Times Book Review, the Washington Post, the San Francisco Chronicle, the Minneapolis Star-Tribune, Salon.com, The Atlantic online, and the New York Observer. He is a popular public speaker and has appeared on several television documentaries. He served as a consultant and on-screen interview subject in the PBS series The American Experience, for the films Jesse James and Grand Central, among other programs. He also taught nonfiction creative writing at Columbia University, and belonged to the faculty of the 2014 World Economic Forum annual meetings. He is a former member of the San Francisco Writer's Grotto.

Currently, Stiles serves on the executive council of the Authors Guild and on the advisory council of the Biographers International Organization.

== Personal life ==
Stiles practices and teaches Japanese Shotokan karate-do, and holds a 6th Dan from the Japan Karate Association. A resident of New York City for twenty years, he now lives in Berkeley, California, with his wife, and two sons.
