= The First Tycoon =

Book by T. J. Stiles

The First Tycoon: The Epic Life of Cornelius Vanderbilt
- The First Tycoon: The Epic Life of Cornelius Vanderbilt
- Author: T. J. Stiles
- Language: English
- Subject: Cornelius Vanderbilt; history/U.S. history
- Genre: Non-fiction; biography
- Publisher: Alfred A. Knopf
- Publication date: April 21, 2009
- Publication place: U.S.
- Media type: Print, digital, audio
- Pages: 736 (hardcover)
- ISBN: 978-0375415425
- Dewey Decimal: 973.5092—ddc22 B
- LC Class: CT275.V23S85 2009
- Preceded by: Jesse James: Last Rebel of the Civil War

The First Tycoon: The Epic Life of Cornelius Vanderbilt is a 2009 biography of Cornelius Vanderbilt, a 19th-century American industrialist and philanthropist who built his fortune in the shipping and railroad industries, becoming one of the wealthiest Americans in the history of the U.S. It was written by American biographer T. J. Stiles. The book was honored with the 2009 National Book Award for Nonfiction and the 2010 Pulitzer Prize for Biography or Autobiography.

== Summary ==
Stiles spent seven years researching and studying the life and worldwide influence of Cornelius Vanderbilt, the patriarch of the Vanderbilt dynasty who made his wealth in the shipping and railroad industries and financially supported the founding of Vanderbilt University. The First Tycoon describes Vanderbilt's life from his 1794 birth to his death in 1877, shedding light on his leadership in expanding railroad transportation into a revolution and establishing the modern corporation.

Stiles raised serious doubts about the claims and secret sources about Vanderbilt.

== Reception ==
The First Tycoon went on to win the 2009 National Book Award for Nonfiction and the 2010 Pulitzer Prize for Biography or Autobiography. It was also named a New York Times Notable Book and one of the best books of the year by The New Yorker, the Financial Times, the Christian Science Monitor, the Boston Globe, and the Philadelphia Inquirer. Additional reviews were offered by Foreign Affairs magazine, the Washington Post, the New York Times Book Review, the New York Times, and Newsweek.

== Honors and awards ==
- 2009 National Book Award for Nonfiction
- 2010 Pulitzer Prize for Biography or Autobiography
