= Benjamin Lawrence Reid =

American professor (1918–1990)

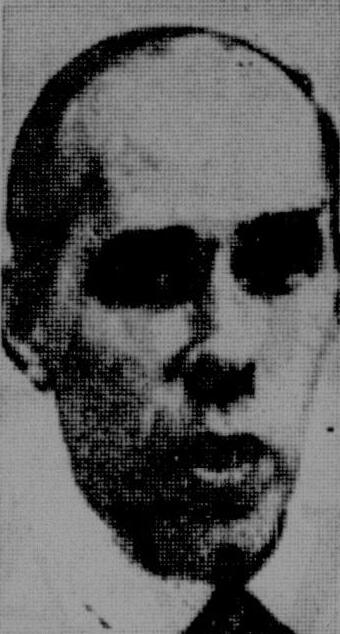
Reid in 1969

Benjamin Lawrence Reid (May 3, 1918 — November 30, 1990) was an American professor in English from the 1940s to 1980s. During his career, Reid primarily taught at Sweet Briar College from 1951 to 1957 and Mount Holyoke College from 1957 to 1983. Outside of academics, Reid wrote multiple books, and won a Pulitzer Prize and other honors.

== Early life and education ==
Reid was born on May 3, 1918, in Louisville, Kentucky, and briefly lived in Texas growing up. During his childhood, Reid played baseball during his childhood and switched to basketball during his teens. For his post-secondary education, Reid first received a Bachelor of Arts from the University of Louisville in the 1940s. In the 1950s, Reid obtained a Master of Arts from Columbia University and a Doctor of Philosophy from the University of Virginia.

== Career ==
As a conscientious objector throughout World War II, Reid was a bridge constructor and a psychiatric hospital orderly. After the war, Reid started his academic tenure as an English lecturer at Iowa State College from 1946 to 1948. Upon continuing his English teaching career at Smith College from 1948 to 1951, Reid became an instructor at Sweet Briar College in 1951. At Sweet Briar, Reid remained as an instructor until he spent his last years at the college as an assistant English professor from 1956 to 1957.

For the last part of his career, Reid joined Mount Holyoke College as an assistant professor in 1957. While at Mount Holyoke, he was promoted to associate professor in 1959, professor in 1963, and English professor in 1970. Reid stayed at Mount Holyoke until ending his academic career in 1983. Outside of academics, Reid published his first books in the late 1950s to early 1960s using his university theses he wrote on Gertrude Stein and William Butler Yeats. He moved on to biographies about New York lawyer John Quinn in 1968 and Irish politician Roger Casement in 1976. While he wrote essays between the two biographies, his last publications were his autobiographies between 1988 and 1990.

== Awards and honors ==
Reid won the 1969 Pulitzer Prize for Biography or Autobiography for The Man from New York: John Quinn and His Friends. Years later, Reid was a finalist of the 1977 National Book Award for Biography and Autobiography for The Lives of Roger Casement. In 1963, Reid received a research grant from the Fulbright Program to study at the University of London. For his book on Russell, Reid was given a fellowship from the National Endowment for the Humanities in 1971.

== Death ==
On November 30, 1990, Reid died from a heart attack and multiple strokes in South Hadley, Massachusetts.
