= Tibor Rosenbaum =

Hungarian-born Swiss rabbi and businessman

- Born: 2 November 1923; Kisvárda, Kingdom of Hungary
- Died: 23 October 1980 (aged 56); Geneva, Switzerland
- Burial place: Har HaMenuchot
- Occupations: Rabbi; businessman
- Spouse: Stephanie Stern

Pinchas Tibor Rosenbaum (Yiddish: פנחס סג״ל ליטש ראזענבוים, romanized: Pinkhas sg"l Litsh Razenboym; 2 November 1923 – 23 October 1980) was a Hungarian-born Swiss rabbi and businessman. One of the heads of the Jewish community in Switzerland, he saved hundreds of Jews during the Holocaust. After the war, he was involved in extensive businesses relating to the economy of Israel. He was also instrumental in helping the new State of Israel with security issues and worked for the Mossad on intelligence matters.

== Early life and career ==
Tibor Rosenbaum was born to Shmuel Shmelke Rosenbaum, the chief rabbi in Kisvárda, Hungary. His grandfather, Moshe Chaim Rosenbaum, was also the Rabbi of Kisvárda and author of Lechem Rav (Hebrew: לחם רב). The family's lineage went back to Judah Loew ben Bezalel. At age 18, he received semikhah (rabbinical ordination) from Yitzhak HaLevi Herzog.

During the Holocaust, Rosenbaum saved hundreds of Jews while being disguised as a German SS officer, a soldier in the Hungarian Arrow Cross, or as a member of the Hungarian Levente, depending on the situation. Upon returning to Kisvárda after the war, Rosenbaum found that the Jewish population had been reduced from the 5,000 who lived there previously to only 400. He was installed as the city's rabbi, replacing his late father. Rosenbaum earned a doctorate in economics and published two books.

== Fraudulent business activities ==
Soon after the establishment of Israel, Rosenbaum started an organization called "Helvis Company" to actively promote Israeli‐Swiss trade. A decade later, Helvis was alleged to have given kickbacks into a special fund of the National Religious party to obtain contracts from the Ministry of Health in connection with two hospitals near Tel Aviv.

Together with his friend Bernard Cornfeld, Rosenbaum founded the Banque De Credit International Genève in Geneva in 1959, which went bankrupt in 1976. This led to a considerable loss of prestige for the Hessische Landesbank, which was most recently closely associated with it. Rosenbaum originally financed arms purchases for Israel through the bank. In 1963, the bank's board of directors was composed of Pierre Audéoud (chair), Samuel Scheps (deputy chair), Jacques Leimbacher (assistant director), Chaim Haller (Deputy) and Rosenbaum. Sylvain Ferdman, who was BCI's office manager in Geneva, acted as "money courier" for Jewish-American organized crime figure Meyer Lansky and other U.S. customers of the bank. It also opened up a connection to Israel for Lansky, who first met Rosenbaum in 1965. In 1973, the bank had two branches in Luxembourg and London. During its active time, the bank had deposits from 8,000 members of the Jewish community living in France. According to Richard Gilbride's book Matrix for Assassination: The JFK Conspiracy, the bank was responsible for handling up to 90% of the Israeli Defense Ministry's arms purchases. The bank is also notable for Avner Less, the Adolf Eichmann interrogator, having worked there from 1968 to 1973. It went into liquidation and was deleted from the Swiss commercial register in 2011.

== Personal life and death ==
Rosenbaum married Stephanie Stern, who survived the war by reaching Switzerland via the Kastner train. They lived in Geneva. Their son Moshe (Eric) Rosenbaum teaches in Yeshivas Derech Etz Chaim in Har Nof, Jerusalem. A daughter, Leah Rowe, lives in Rehavya, Jerusalem. Their son Shmuel (Charles, born 1952) was head of Geneva-based investment vehicle Cifco. He was an associate of Ephraim Margulies, notable for the Guinness share-trading fraud related to Ivan Boesky, the Jewish-American stock trader.

Rosenbaum died from a heart attack in Geneva on 23 October 1980, leaving behind his wife, two sons and a daughter. He was buried on Har HaMenuchot.
