= John Quinn (collector) =

American lawyer

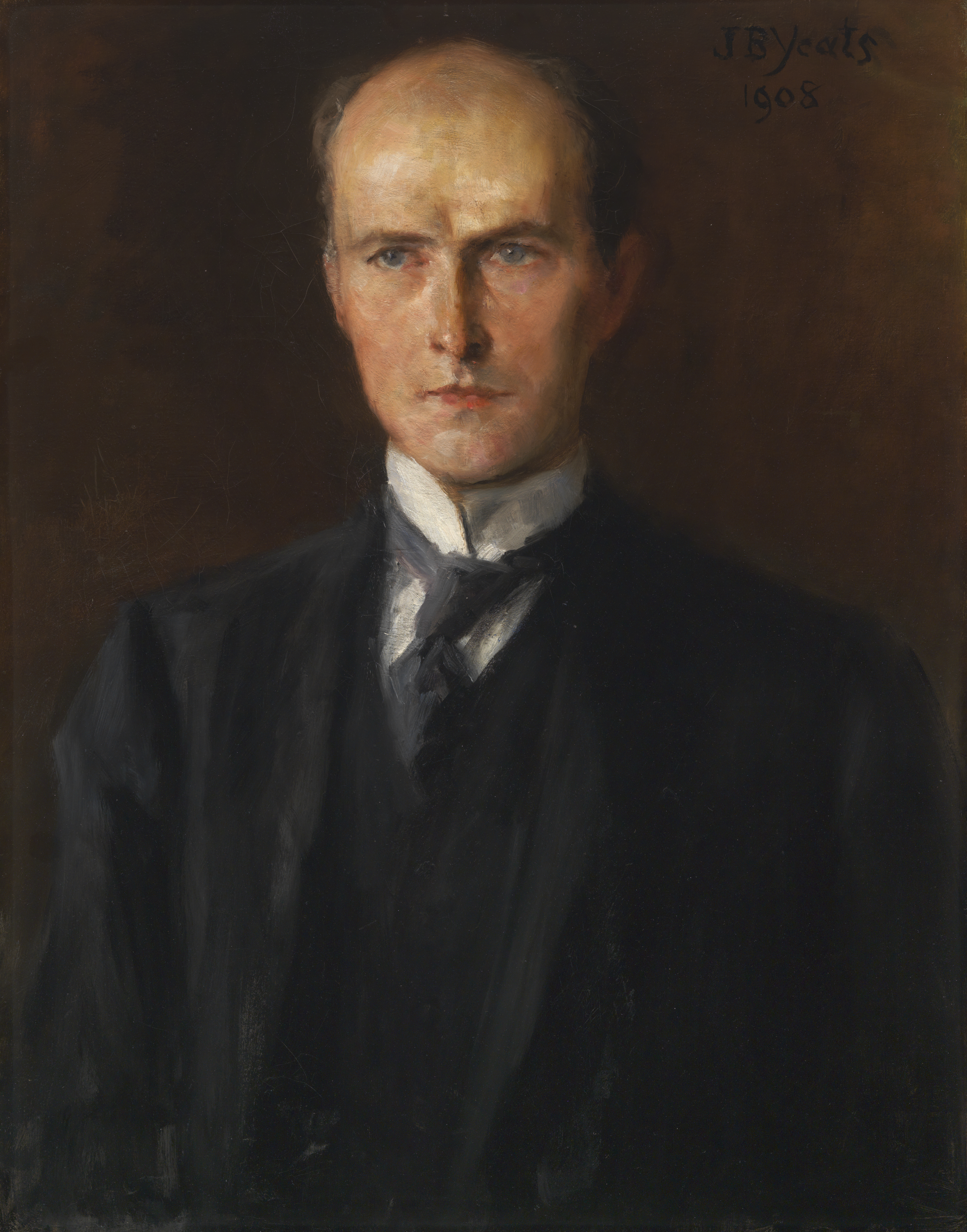
- John Quinn by John Butler Yeats, 1908
- Born: April 14, 1870; Tiffin, Ohio
- Died: July 28, 1924 (aged 54); Fostoria, Ohio
- Education: University of Michigan
- Occupations: American lawyer and art collector

John Quinn (April 14, 1870 in Tiffin, Ohio – July 28, 1924 in Fostoria, Ohio) was an Irish-American cognoscente of the art world and a lawyer in New York City who fought to overturn censorship laws restricting modern literature and art from entering the United States.

Quinn was an important patron of chief figures in Post-Impressionism and literary Modernism, a major collector of modern art and original manuscripts, and the first to exhibit these works after winning legal battles against censorship and cultural isolation. In the 1920s he owned the largest single collection of modern European paintings in the world. He fought key legal battles that opened American culture to 20th-century art movements, including his Congressional appeals to overturn the Payne–Aldrich Tariff Act.

He was part of the group who staged the Armory Show in 1913, the first great exhibition of European and American modern art in the United States, at the 69th Regiment Armory in New York. Quinn gave practical advice and financial assistance to Ezra Pound and T.S. Eliot. In gratitude, Eliot sent Quinn the original manuscript of his 1922 poem The Waste Land, including Pound's editorial suggestions.

== Biography ==
Quinn was born in Tiffin, Ohio, one of seven children (only two of whom are known to have survived childhood) born to an Irish baker and grocer, James William Quinn, and his wife, Mary (née Quinlan). He grew up in nearby Fostoria, where his parents had relocated in 1871, a year after John's birth. His paternal grandparents, James, a blacksmith, and Mary (née Madigan) Quinn, natives of County Limerick, had settled in Tiffin in 1851.

After graduating from the University of Michigan and Georgetown University Law School, followed by a degree in international relations from Harvard University, Quinn became a successful New York lawyer, getting involved in New York’s Tammany Hall politics, but when his candidate did not get the nomination at the 1912 Democratic National Convention he became disgusted with the whole system and became an art patron, art collector, and collector of manuscripts.

John Quinn is named as buyer of three works sold in 1911 from the collection of newspaper publisher William MacKay Laffan. His taste was conservative and expensive: a painting of the Christ with Joseph and Mary by seventeenth-century Spaniard Alonso Cano; an Italian triptych of the Virgin with St. Sebastian and St. Roch, attributed to the Ferrarese Master of 1514; a Dutch triptych 'Adoration of the Kings' which more recently is attributed to the Master of 1518 but was sold to Quinn as a work by Lucas van Leyden (1494-1533). In time, Quinn’s tastes in art became more worldly. Naturalistic portraits and loosely painted landscapes by English, Welsh and Irish artists were only the foundation of his collection. As the second decade of the 20th century began, his interests shifted across the English Channel to works by Manet, Camille Pissarro, and Pierre Puvis de Chavannes. He was the patron of artist Gwen John, supporting her financially from 1911 until his death. He bought most of the works that she sold. He began to buy traditional paintings, drawings, sculpture, and decorative art from China and Japan. His French adviser for Post-Impressionist art was Henri-Pierre Roche, who later wrote the novel Jules et Jim. Quinn and Roche worked together to develop the famous 1913 Armory Show.

Quinn was a principal supporter and purchaser of manuscripts of novelist Joseph Conrad during his lifetime. He met Irish poet W. B. Yeats in 1902 and became a major supporter, helping him found the Abbey Theatre.

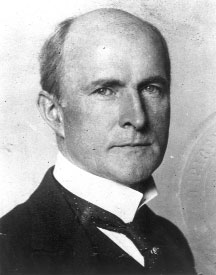

According to author Richard Spence, Quinn was a supporter of the Irish nationalist cause and associated with figures such as John Devoy and Roger Casement, although he had reportedly worked for British Intelligence services before, during, and after World War I. In this role he acted as case officer for, among others, Aleister Crowley, who was an agent provocateur posing as an Irish nationalist in order to infiltrate anti-British groups of Irish and Germans in the United States.

In the early 1920s Quinn represented Margaret Anderson and Jane Heap for their publication in The Little Review of serial portions of James Joyce's Ulysses, which the U.S. Post Office had found "obscene".

Quinn was a friend of American poet Ezra Pound. Quinn gave financial assistance to Pound and T.S. Eliot, and helped Eliot to negotiate contracts with U.S. publishers. In gratitude, Eliot sent Quinn the original manuscript of The Waste Land in 1923, containing editorial suggestions by Pound and Vivienne Eliot written on the drafts.

The Waste Land manuscript was presumed lost for many years. It was rediscovered in 1968 in the Berg Collection of the New York Public Library, which had purchased some of Quinn's manuscripts in 1958. Rediscovery of The Waste Land manuscript was announced in conjunction with the publication of Benjamin Lawrence Reid's biography, The Man from New York: John Quinn and His Friends in 1968.

== Art promotion ==
In 1913, he convinced the United States Congress to overturn the 1909 Payne–Aldrich Tariff Act, which retained the duty on foreign works of art less than 20 years old, discouraging Americans from collecting modern European art. A huge and controversial event, the 1913 Armory Show (officially The International Exhibition of Modern Art) in New York City included examples of Symbolism, Impressionism, Post-Impressionism, Neo-Impressionism, and Cubism. Quinn opened the exhibition with the words:

... it was time the American people had an opportunity to see and judge for themselves concerning the work of the Europeans who are creating a new art.

In 1913 Quinn represented Margaret Kieley in a $2,000,000 legal contest over the Last Will and Testament of her husband Timothy J. Kieley's estate. Margaret prevailed because her husband's nephews and nieces could not produce vital witnesses and defaulted.

== Estate sale ==
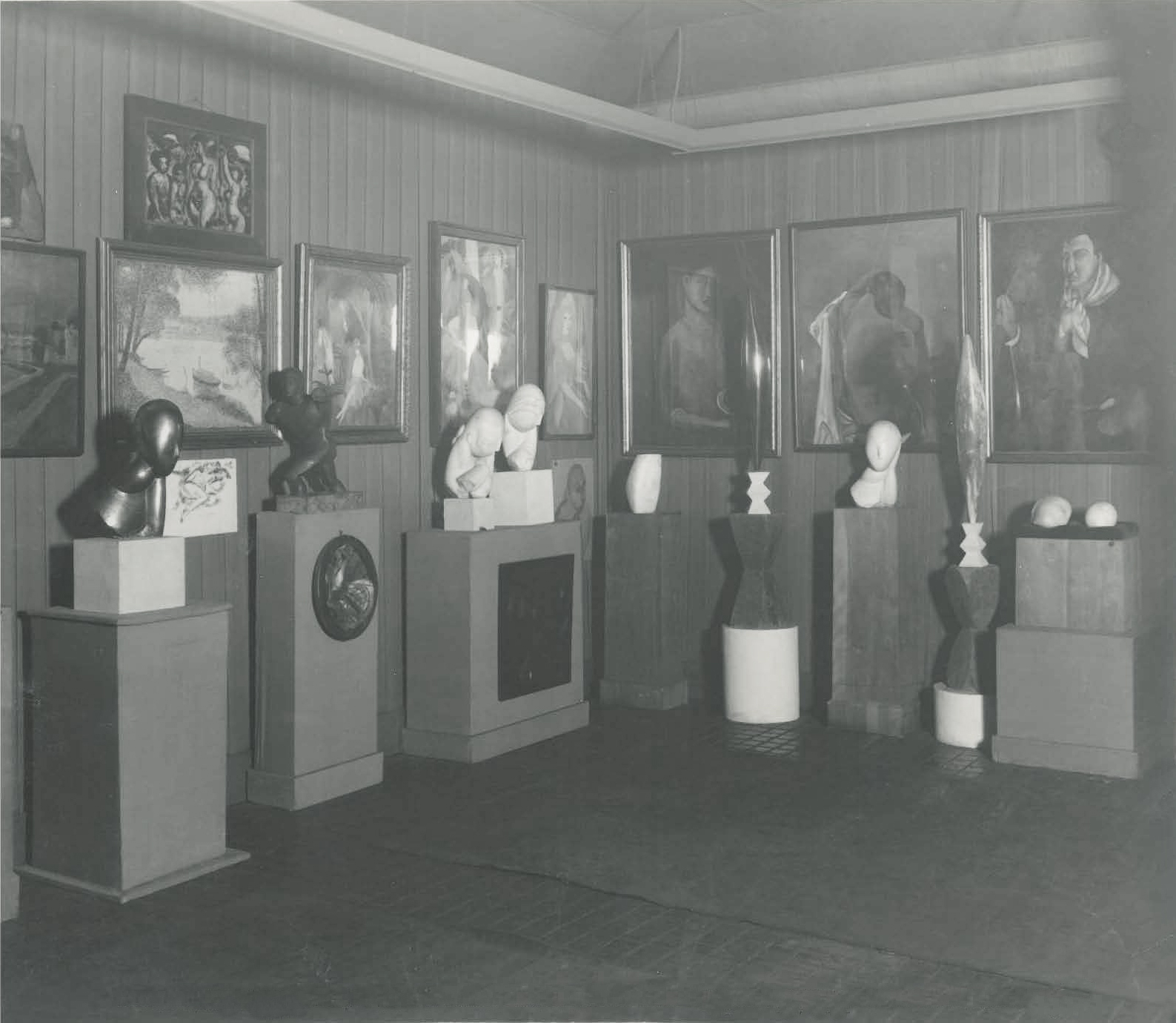
Photograph of works in a Quinn estate auction, New York, 1927

Quinn died at age 54 of intestinal cancer and was buried by his family in his native Fostoria.

Believing no American museum would appreciate his collection of modern art and wanting to provide for his sister, Julia Quinn Anderson, he wrote a will in 1918 directing that the collection be liquidated upon his death.

In 1927, an exhibition and sale of Quinn's art collection took place in New York City. The event included works by Henri Matisse, André Derain, Maurice de Vlaminck, Robert Delaunay, Jacques Villon, Albert Gleizes, Jean Metzinger, Gino Severini, Marie Laurencin, Constantin Brâncuși, and Raymond Duchamp-Villon, in addition to American artists Arthur B. Davies, Walt Kuhn, Marsden Hartley, Stanton Macdonald-Wright, and Max Weber. The sale was conducted by Otto Bernet and Hiram H. Parke at the American Art Galleries. A catalog was published for the occasion by the American Art Association.

== Works from Quinn's collection ==
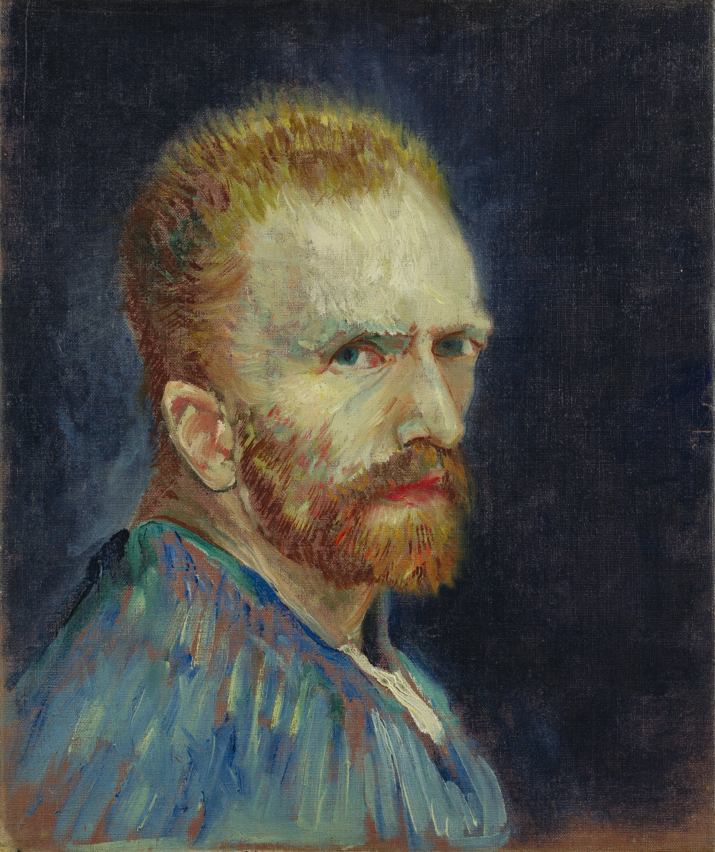
Vincent van Gogh, 1887, Self-Portrait, oil on canvas, 41 × 33.5 cm, Wadsworth Athenaeum, Hartford, CT

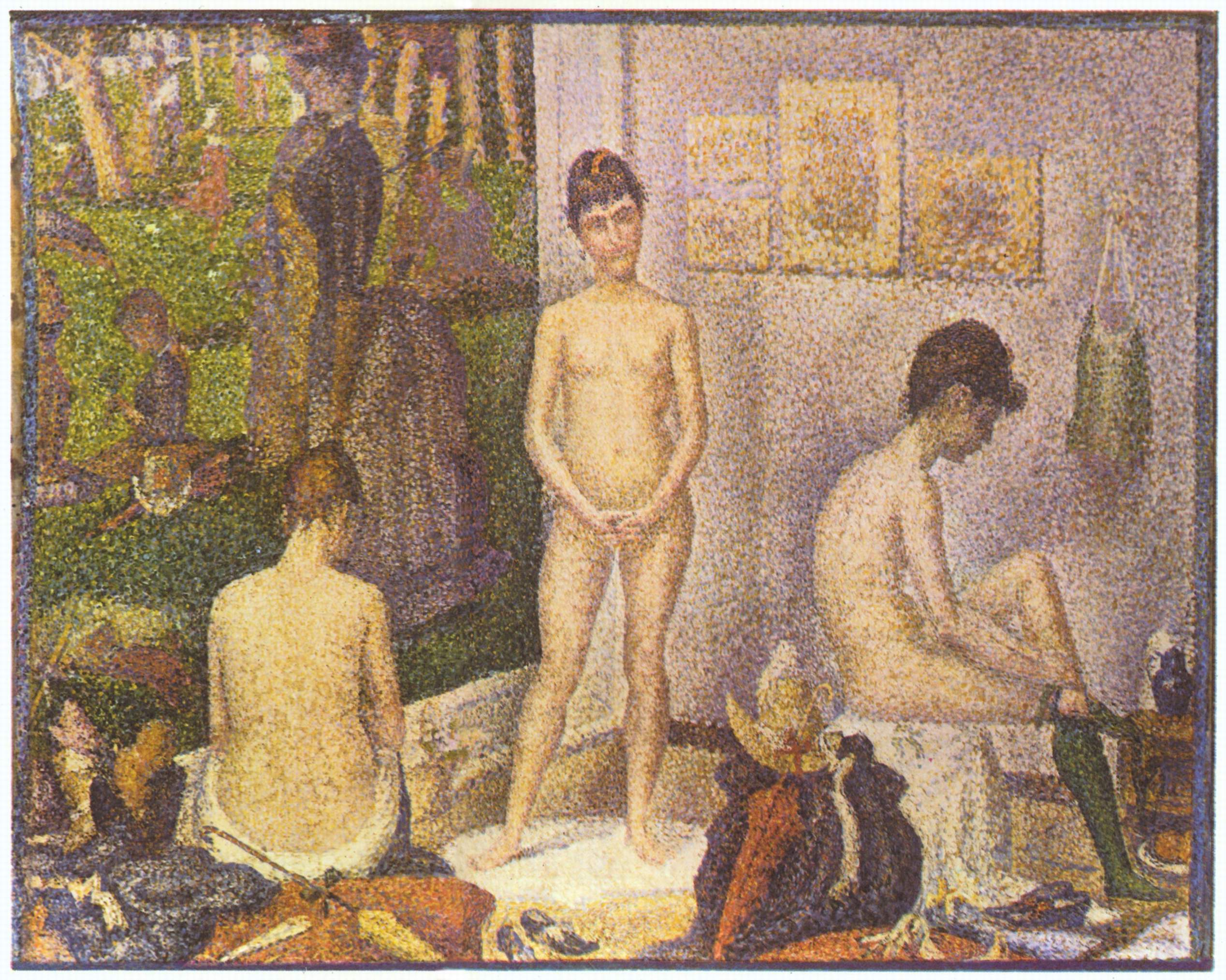
Georges Seurat, 1888, Les Poseuses, ensemble, oil on canvas, 39.4 × 48.7 cm, Henry P. McIlhenny Collection, Philadelphia Museum of Art

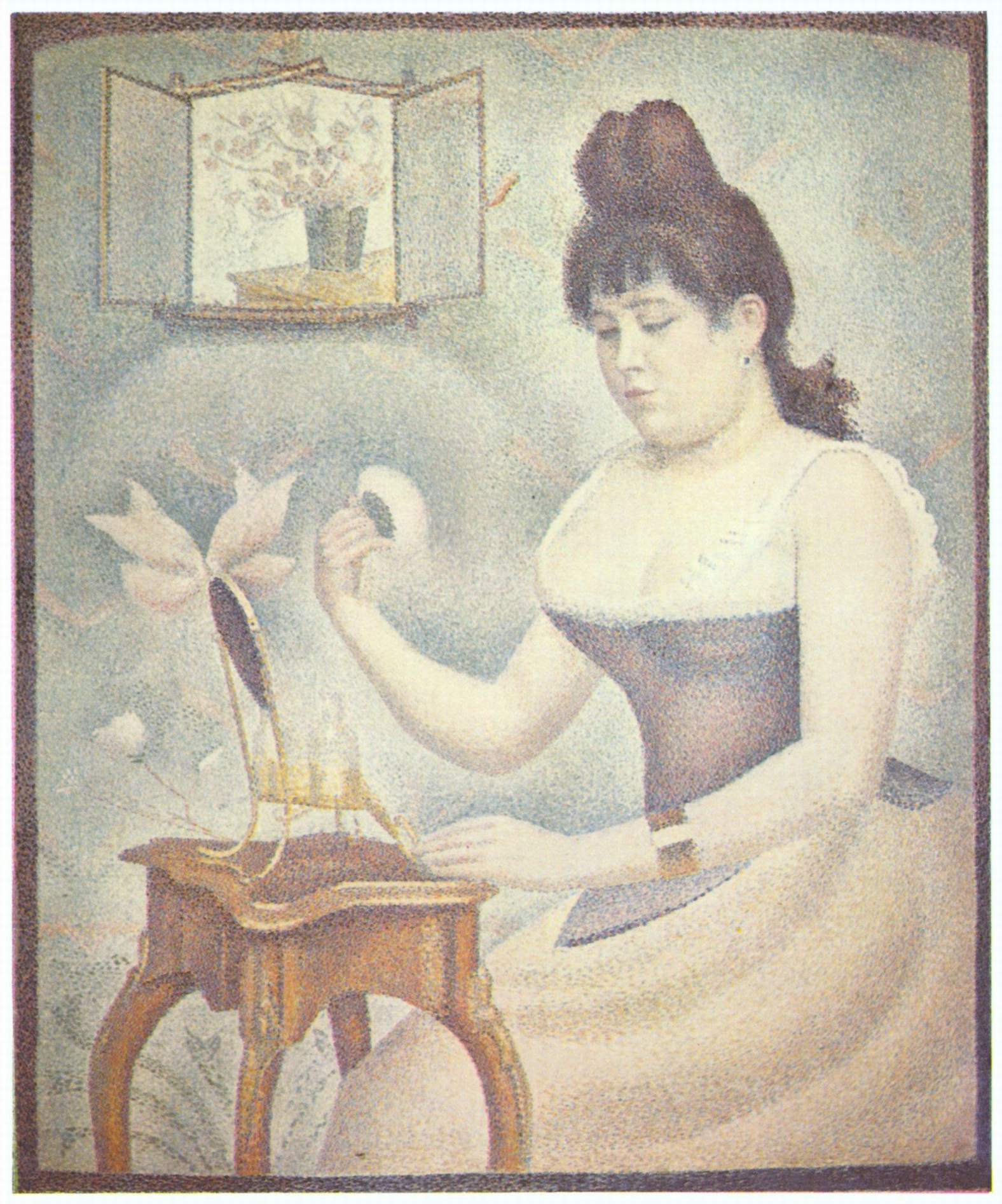
Georges Seurat, 1889–90, Jeune femme se poudrant (La Poudreuse), oil on canvas, 94.2 × 79.5 cm, Courtauld Institute of Art, London

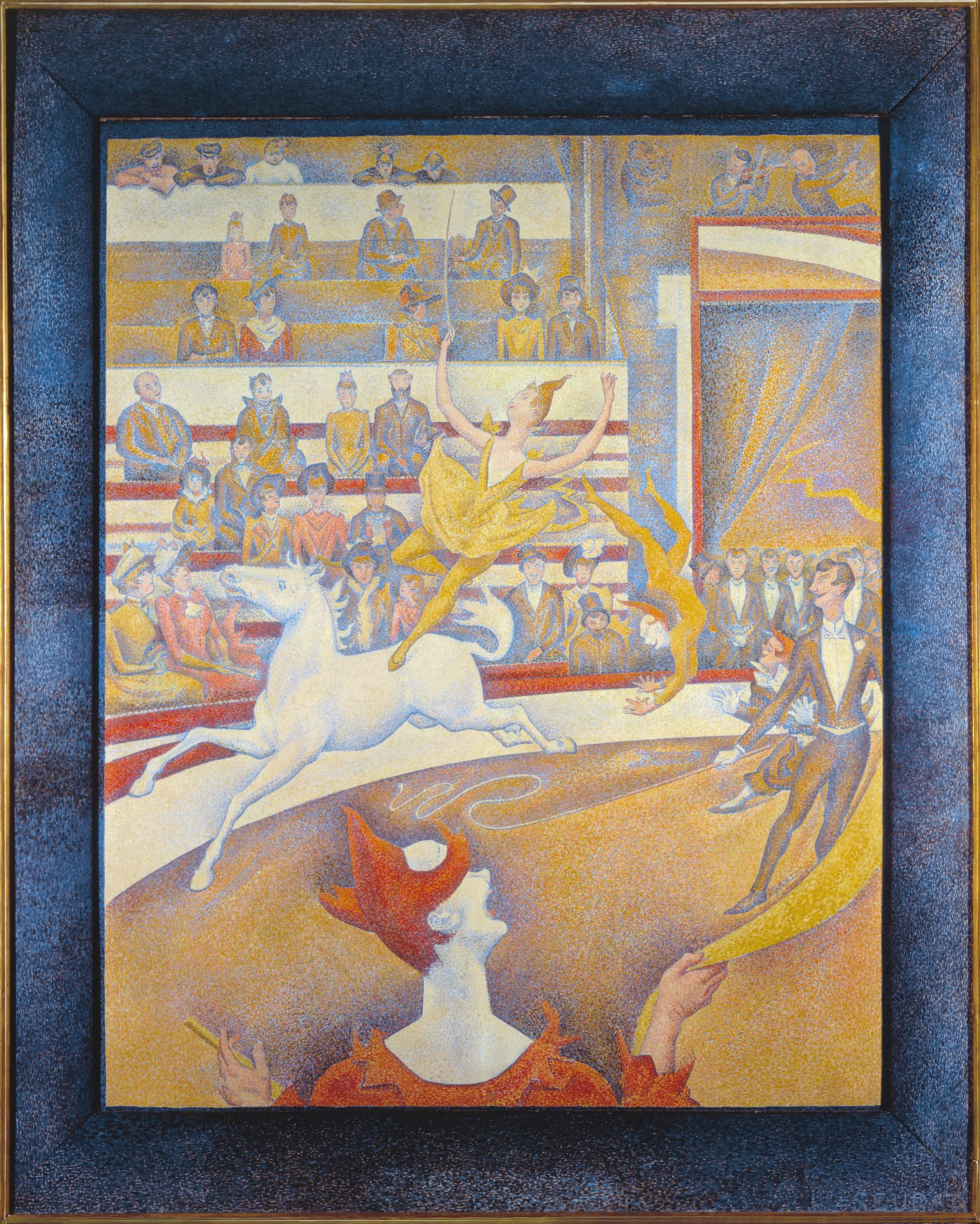
Georges Seurat, 1891, Le Cirque (The Circus), oil on canvas, 185 x 152 cm, Musée d'Orsay, Paris

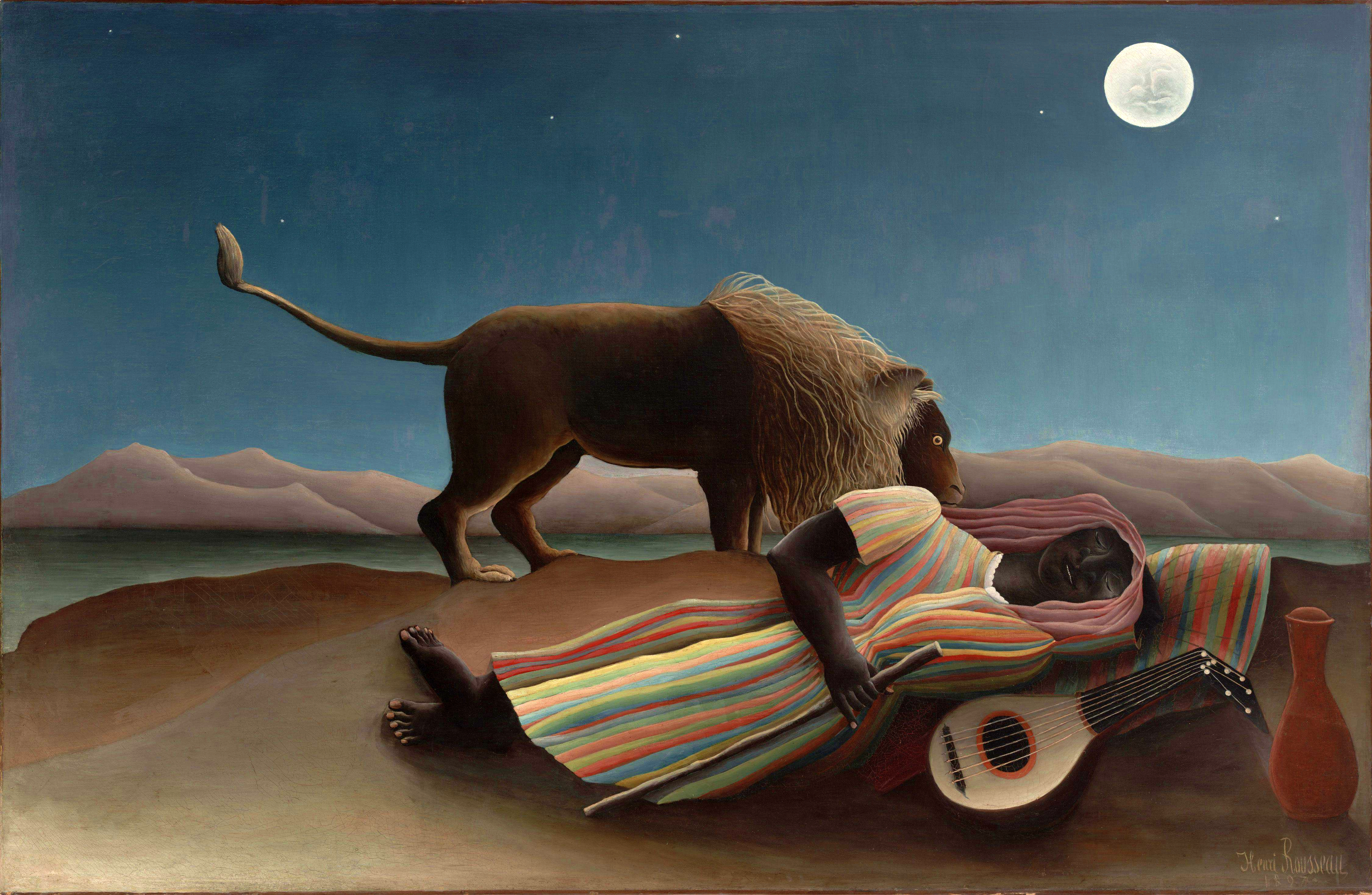
Henri Rousseau, 1897, The Sleeping Gypsy, oil on canvas, 130 × 201 cm, Museum of Modern Art, New York

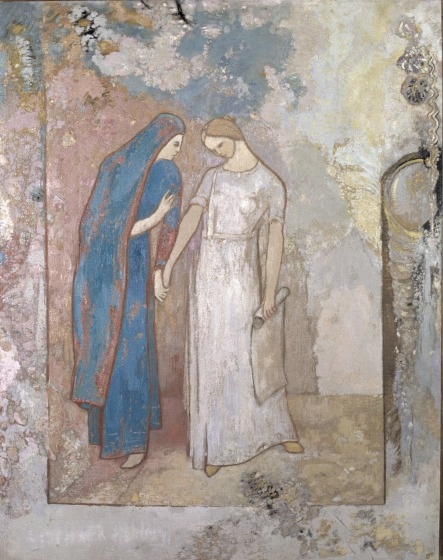
Odilon Redon, c.1905, Initiation study: two young ladies, oil on canvas, 93 x 65 cm, Dallas Museum of Art

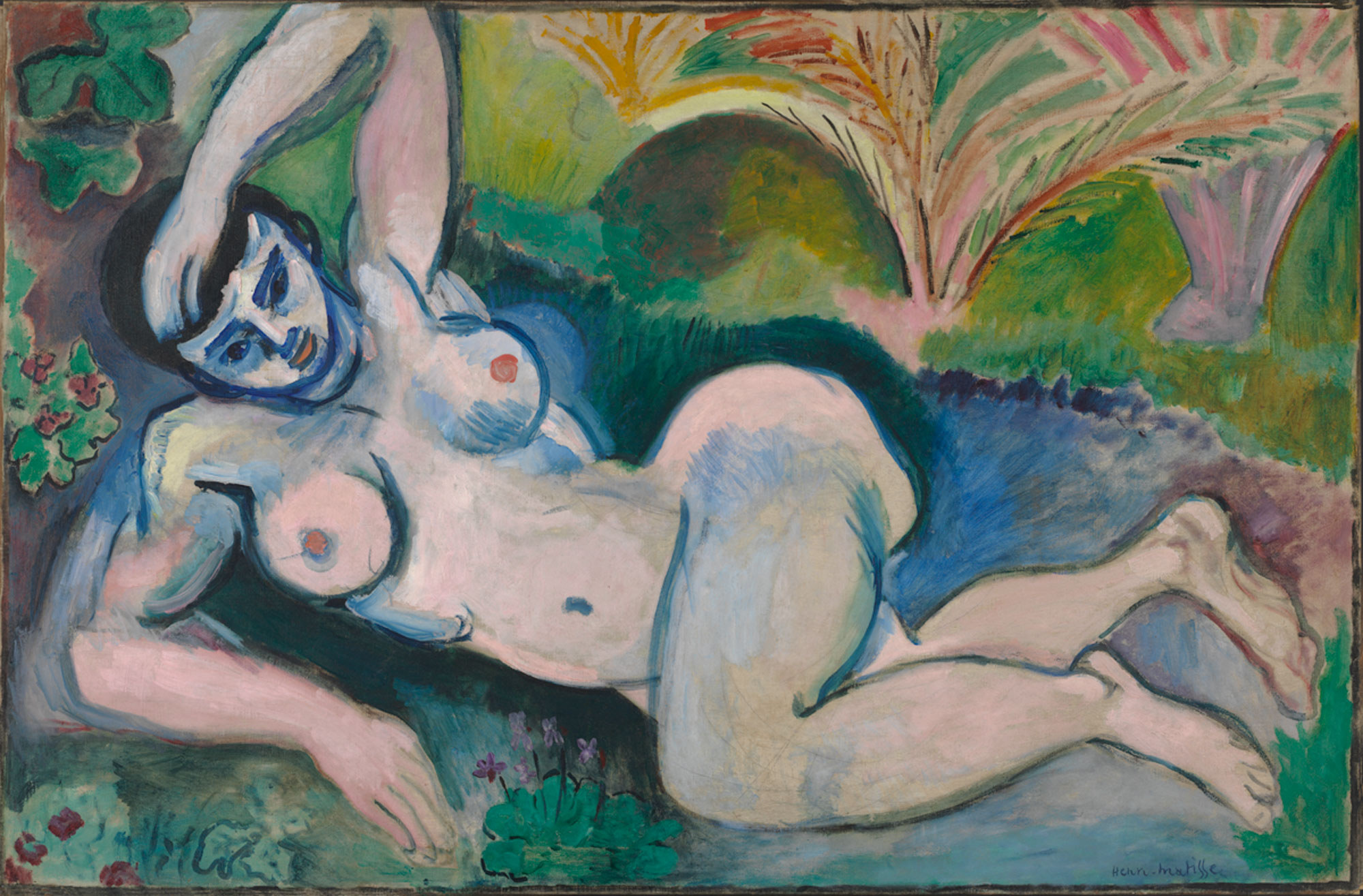
Henri Matisse, 1907, Blue Nude (Souvenir de Biskra), oil on canvas, 92.1 x 140.3 cm, Baltimore Museum of Art. This painting created an international sensation at the 1913 Armory Show in New York City

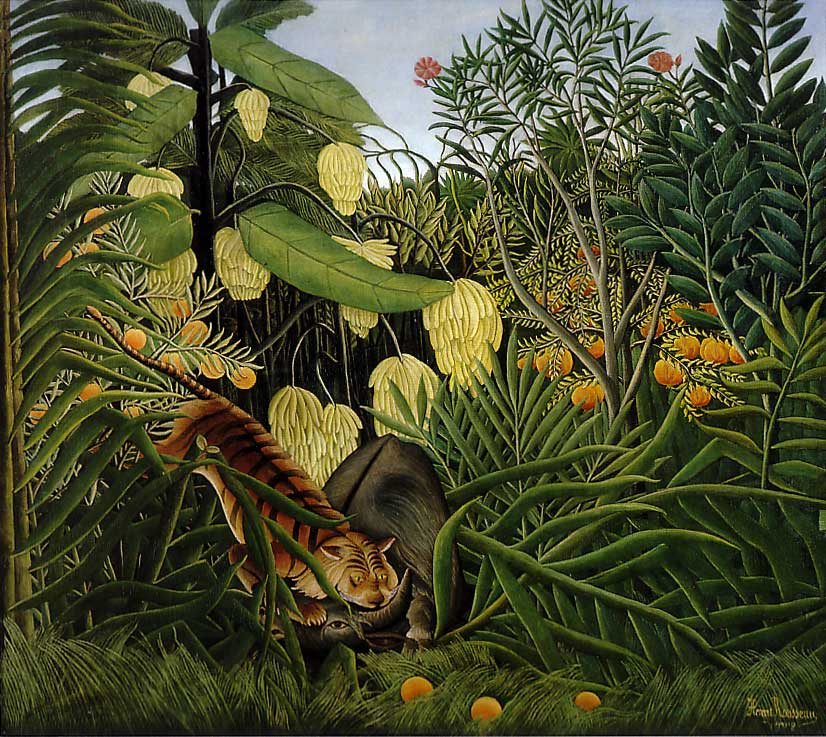
Henri Rousseau, 1908, Fight Between a Tiger and a Buffalo (The Jungle), oil on canvas, 170 × 189.5 cm, Cleveland Museum of Art

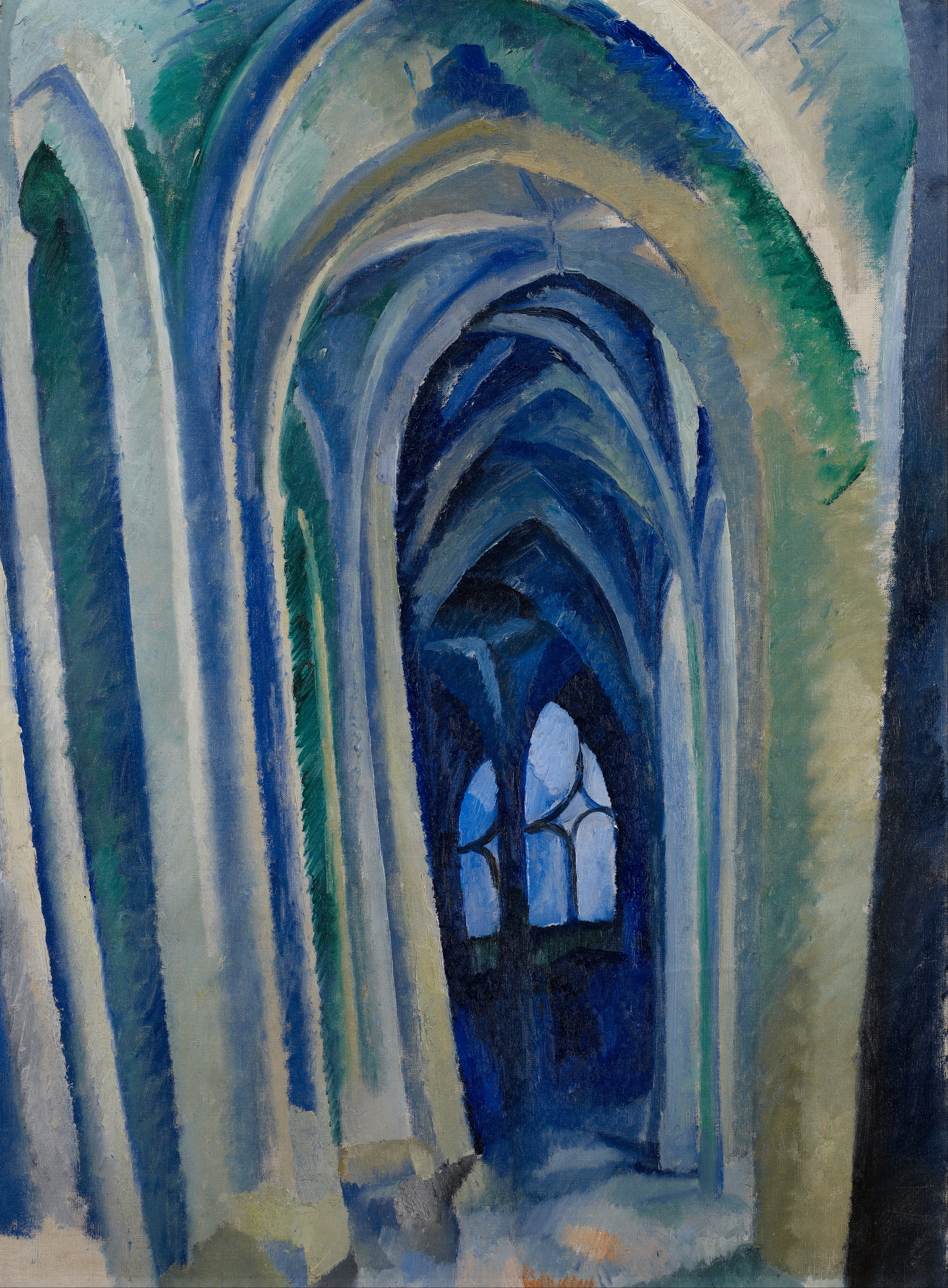
Robert Delaunay, 1909, Saint-Séverin no.2, oil on canvas, 99.37 x 73.9 cm, Minneapolis Institute of Art

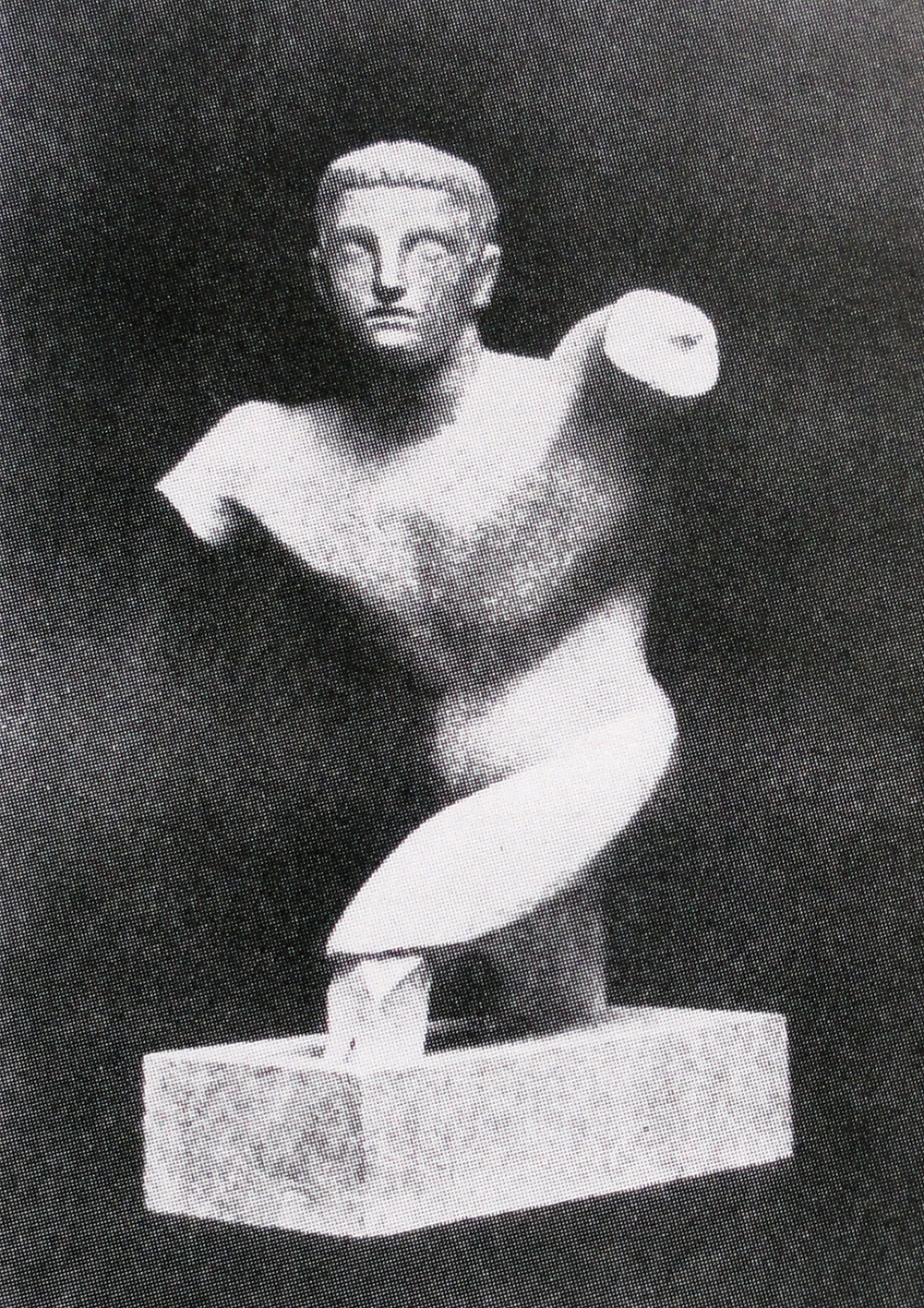
Raymond Duchamp-Villon, 1910–11, Torse de jeune homme (Torso of a young man), terracotta, 60.4 cm, Armory Show postcard, published 1913. Hirshhorn Museum and Sculpture Garden, Smithsonian Institution, Washington, D.C.

Marcel Duchamp, 1910, Joueur d'échecs (The Chess Game), oil on canvas, 114 x 146.5 cm, Philadelphia Museum of Art

Pablo Picasso, 1910, Portrait of Wilhelm Uhde, oil on canvas, 81 x 60 cm, Joseph Pulitzer Collection

Georges Braque, 1910, Violin and Candlestick, oil on canvas, 60.96 x 50.17 cm, San Francisco Museum of Modern Art

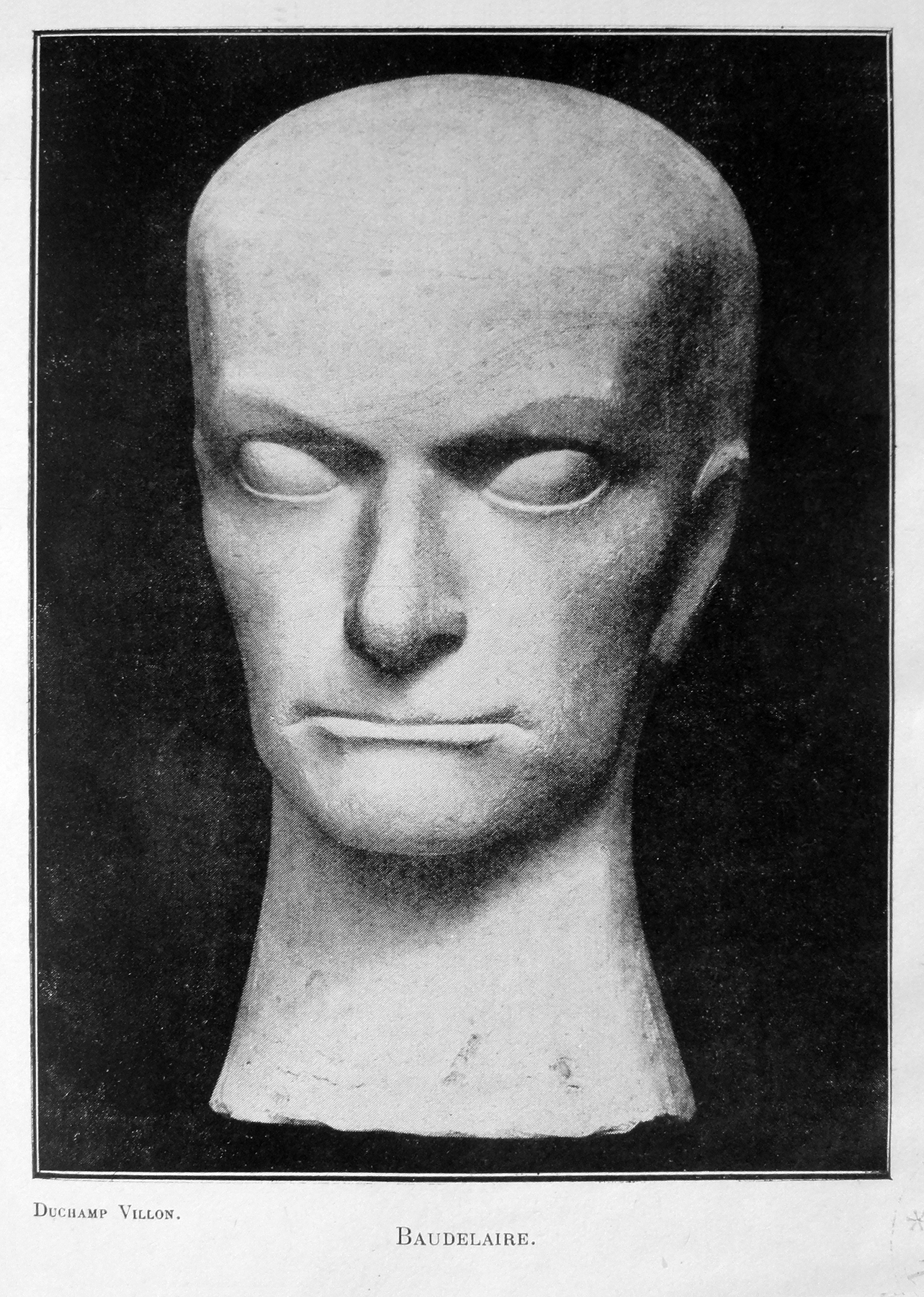
Raymond Duchamp-Villon, 1911, Baudelaire

Jean Metzinger, 1912, At the Cycle-Race Track (Au Vélodrome), oil and sand on canvas, 130.4 x 97.1 cm, The Solomon R. Guggenheim Foundation, Peggy Guggenheim Collection, Venice

Jacques Villon, 1912, Girl at the Piano (Fillette au piano), oil on canvas, 129.2 x 96.4 cm, oval, Museum of Modern Art, New York. Exhibited at the 1913 Armory Show, New York, Chicago and Boston. Purchased from the Armory Show by John Quinn

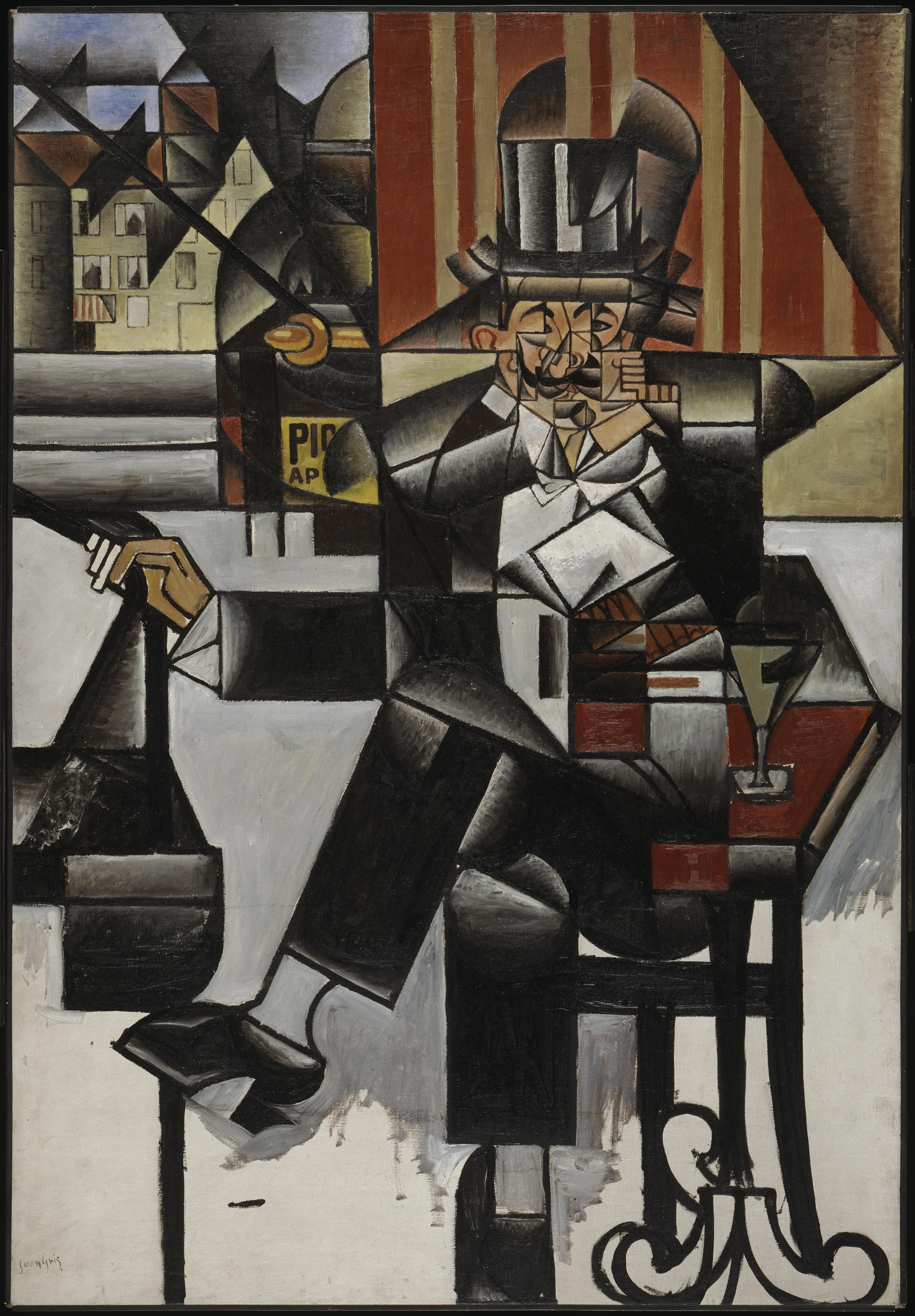
Juan Gris, 1912, Man in a Café, oil on canvas, 127.6 x 88.3 cm, Philadelphia Museum of Art. Reproduced in The Cubist Painters, Aesthetic Meditations, by Guillaume Apollinaire

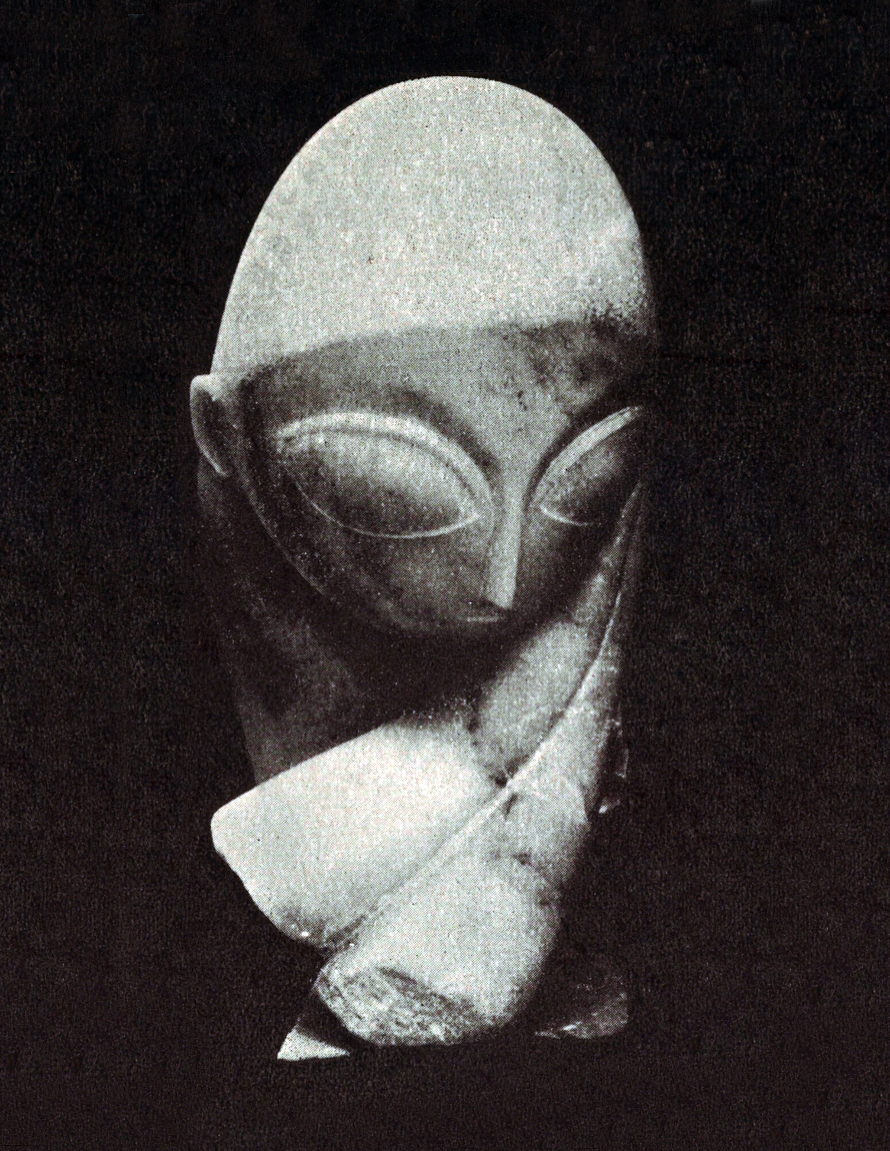
Constantin Brâncuși, 1912, Portrait of Mlle Pogany, Philadelphia Museum of Art, Philadelphia. Armory Show postcard

Constantin Brâncuși, 1912, Une Muse, plaster, 45.7 cm, Armory Show postcard. Exhibited: New York, Armory of the 69th Infantry (no. 618); The Art Institute of Chicago (no. 26) and Boston, Copley Hall (no. 8), International Exhibition of Modern Art, February–May 1913

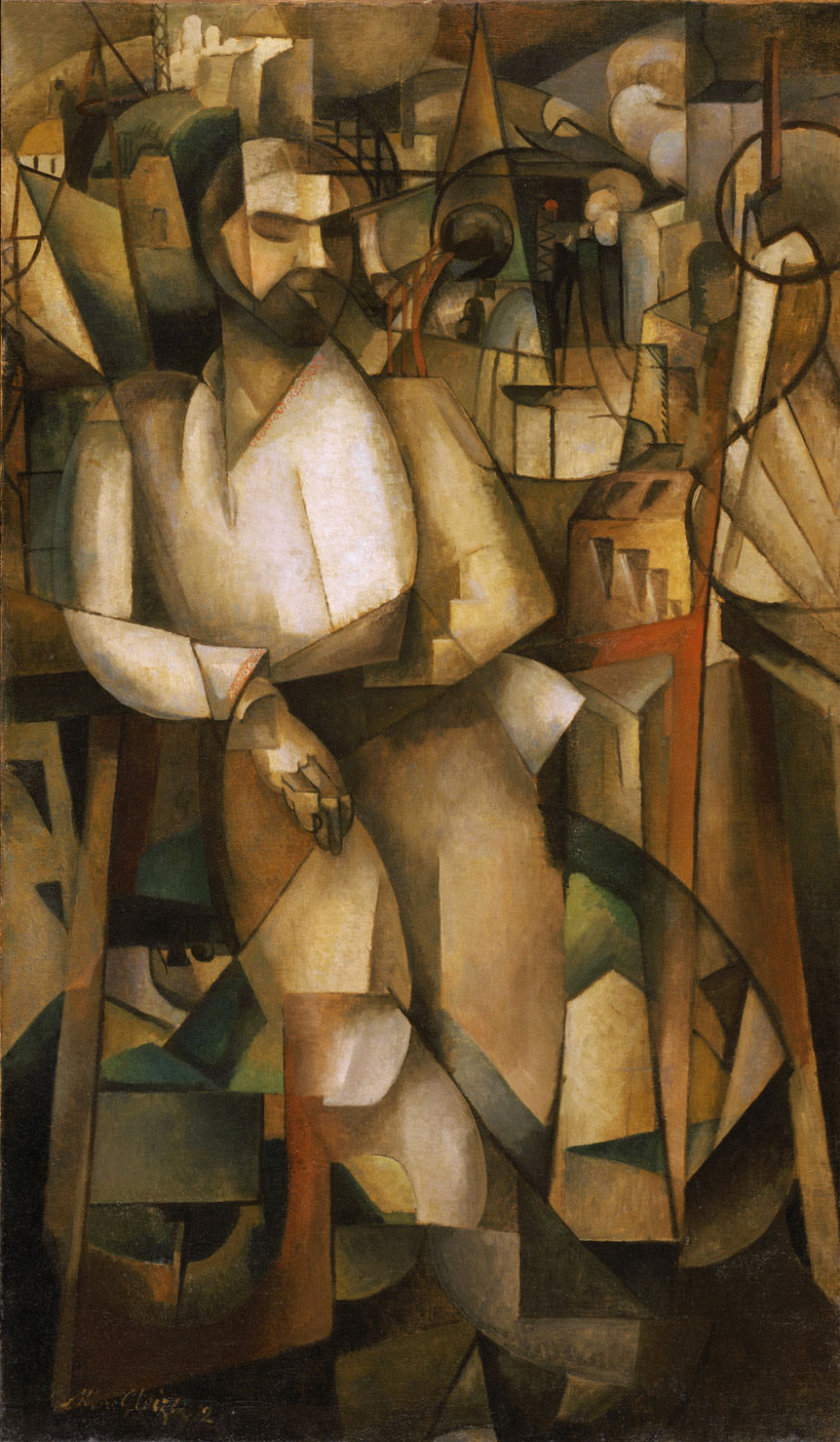
Albert Gleizes, 1912, l'Homme au Balcon, Man on a Balcony (Portrait of Dr. Théo Morinaud), oil on canvas, 195.6 x 114.9 cm, Philadelphia Museum of Art. Completed the year Gleizes co-authored Du "Cubisme" with Metzinger. Exhibited at the Armory Show, New York, Chicago, Boston, 1913

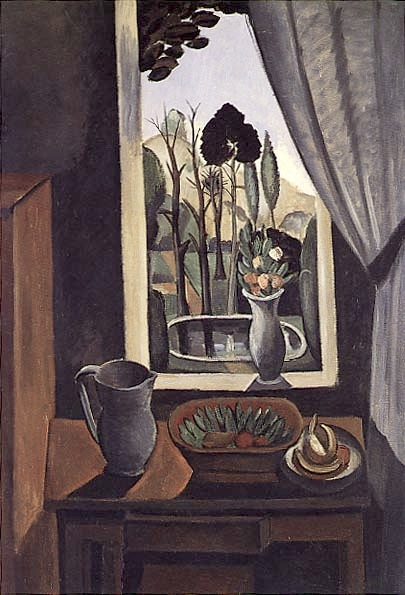
André Derain, 1912, Window on the Park (La Fênetre sur le parc), 130.8 x 89.5 cm, Museum of Modern Art, New York

Jacques Villon, 1914, Portrait de M. J. B. peintre (Jacques Bon), oil on canvas, 121.92 x 81.28 cm, Columbus Museum of Art

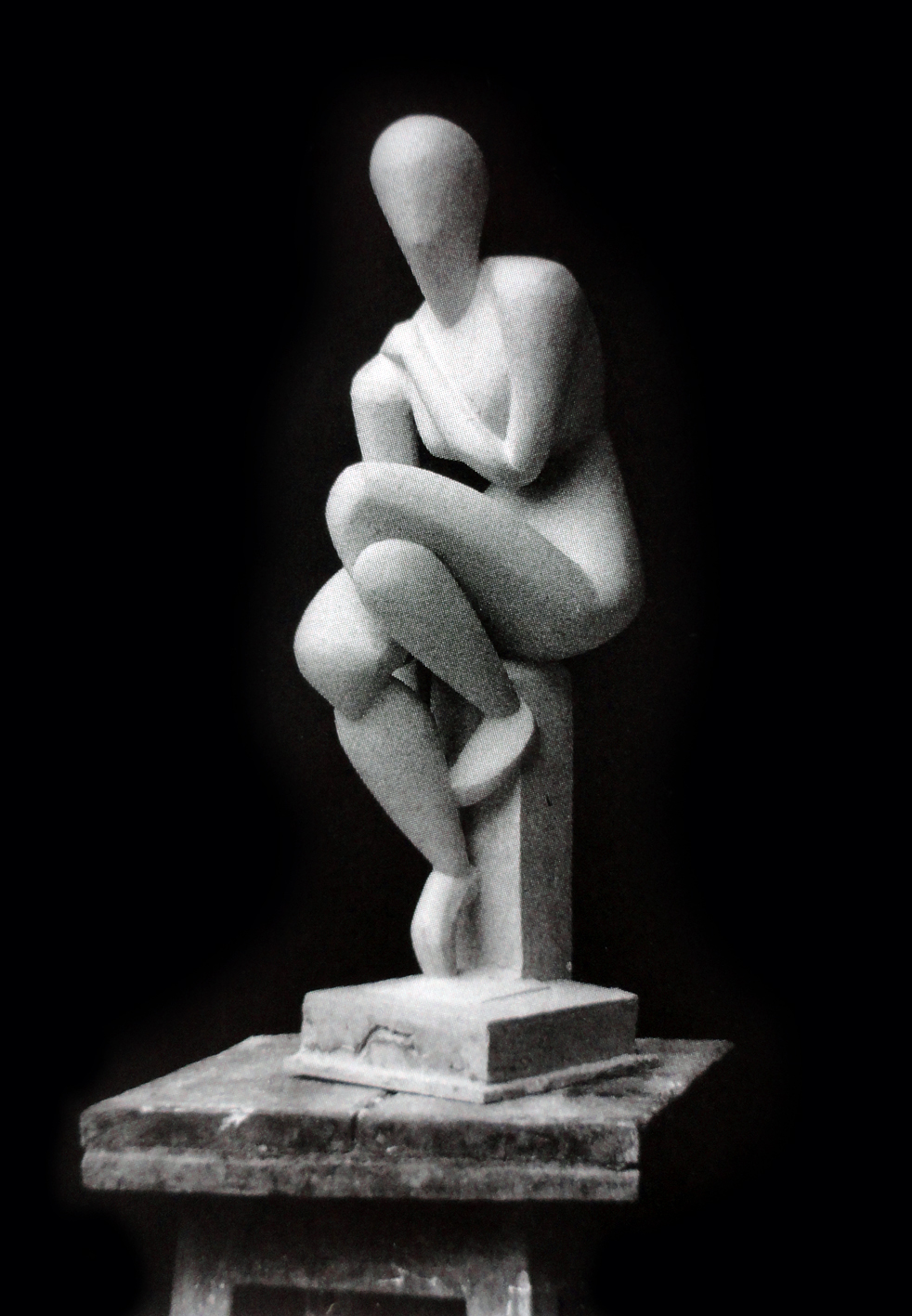
Raymond Duchamp-Villon, 1914, Femme assise, plaster, 65.5 cm, photograph by Duchamp-Villon

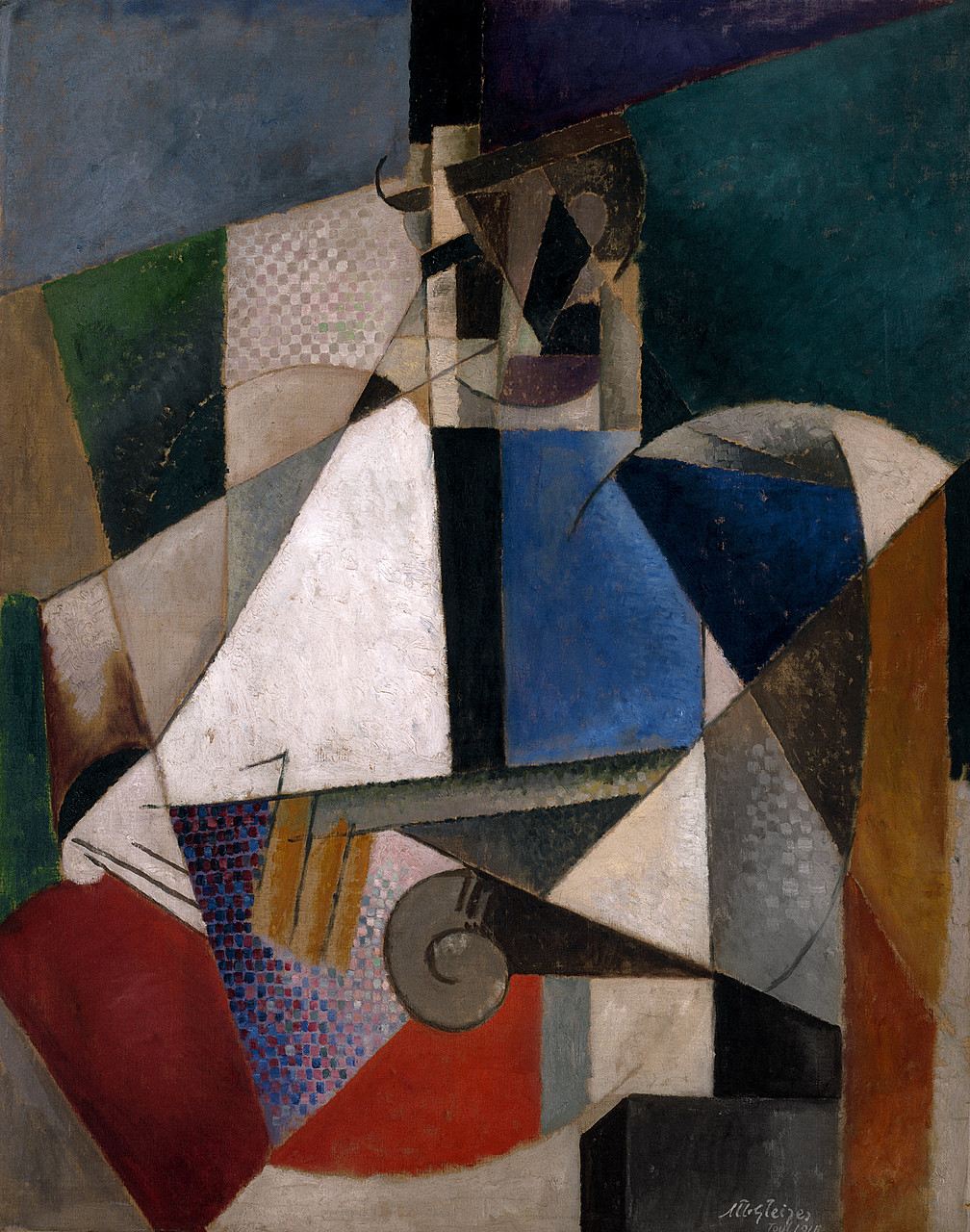
Albert Gleizes, 1914–15, Portrait of an Army Doctor (Portrait d'un médecin militaire), oil on canvas, 119.8 x 95.1 cm, Solomon R. Guggenheim Museum

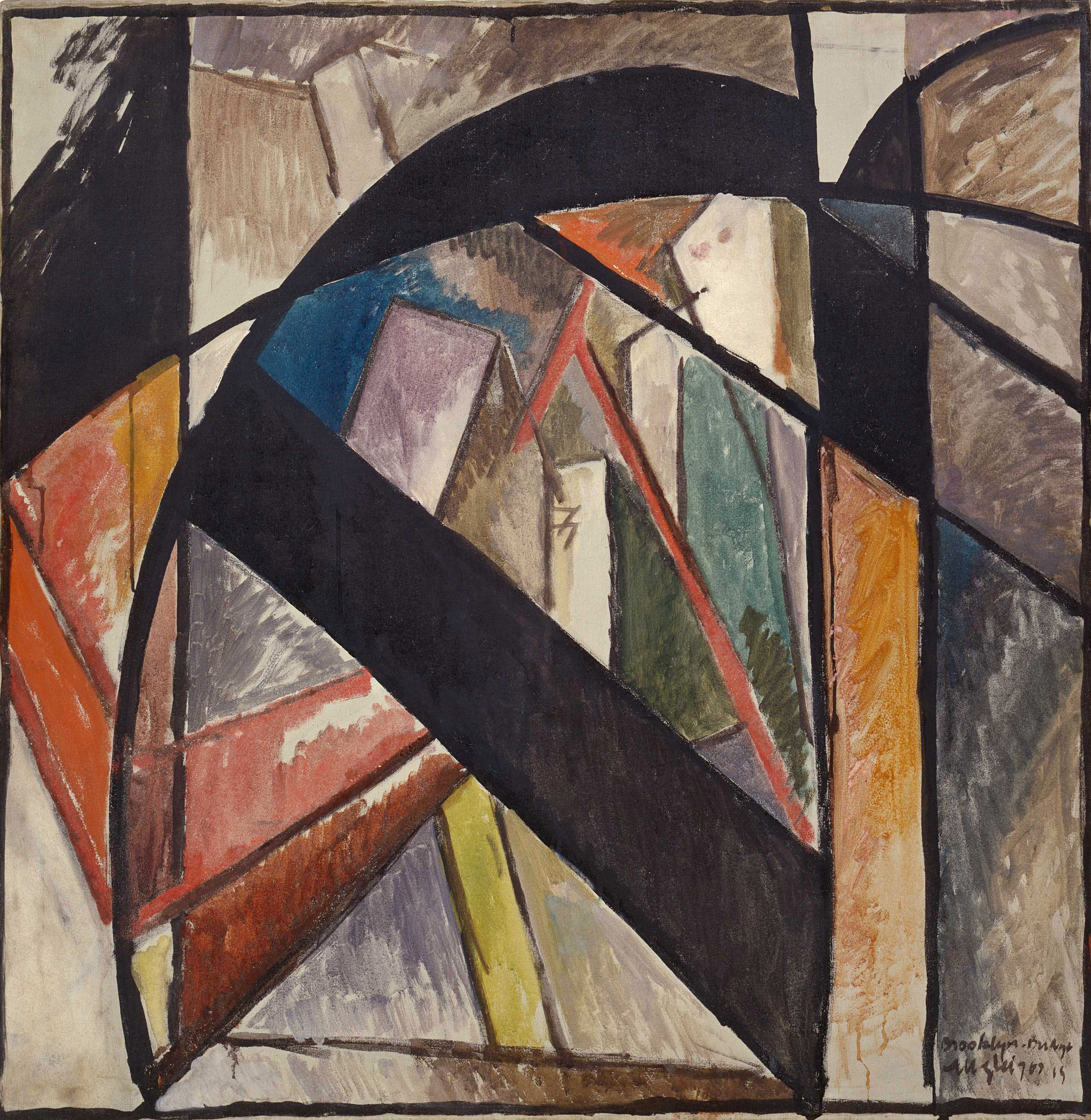
Albert Gleizes, 1915, Brooklyn Bridge (Pont de Brooklyn), oil and gouache on canvas, 102 x 102 cm, Solomon R. Guggenheim Museum, New York

Jean Metzinger, 1916, Femme au miroir (Femme à sa toilette, Lady at her Dressing Table), oil on canvas, 92.4 x 65.1 cm, private collection

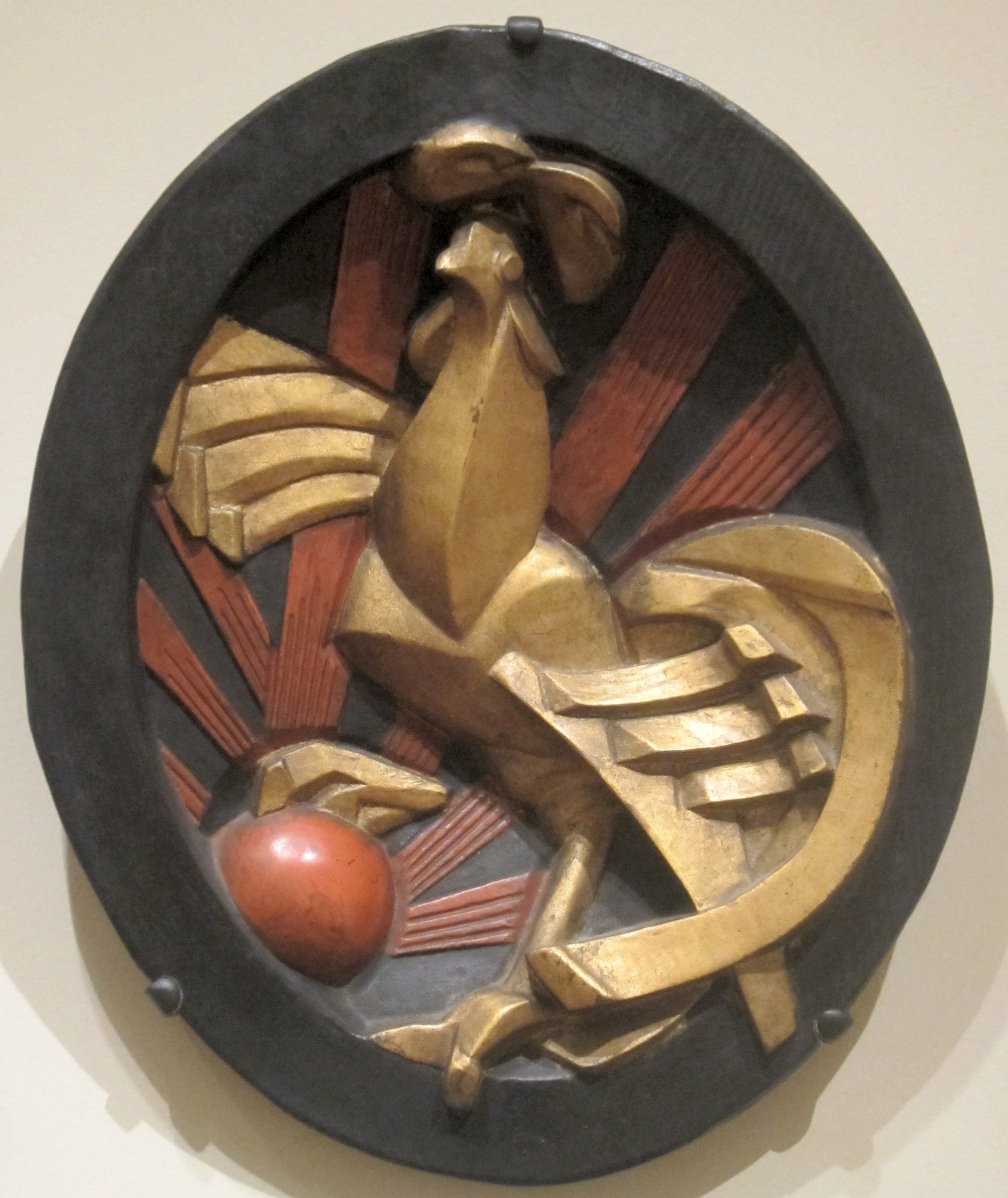
Raymond Duchamp-Villon, 1916, Rooster (Gallic Cock), painted bronze, Cleveland Museum of Art

Pablo Picasso, 1918, Arlequin au violon (Harlequin with Violin), oil on canvas, 142 x 100.3 cm, Cleveland Museum of Art

Pablo Picasso, 1919, Paysage (Landscape with Dead and Live Trees), oil on canvas, 49.4 x 65.4 cm, Bridgestone Museum of Art, Tokyo
