= True Nature: The Pilgrimage of Peter Matthiessen =

2025 biography by Lance Richardson

- Author: Lance Richardson
- Language: English
- Subject: Peter Matthiessen
- Genre: Biography
- Publisher: Pantheon Books
- Publication date: October 14, 2025
- Publication place: United States
- Pages: 736
- ISBN: 978-1-5247-4831-9

True Nature: The Pilgrimage of Peter Matthiessen is a 2025 biography of the American novelist and naturalist Peter Matthiessen by Lance Richardson. It is the first biography of Matthiessen. Pantheon Books published it in the United States, and Chatto & Windus released it in the United Kingdom under the title True Nature: The Lives of Peter Matthiessen. It was a finalist for the 2026 Pulitzer Prize for Biography.

== Background ==
Richardson first read Matthiessen through The Snow Leopard and set out to write a book about landscapes and animals that would revisit Matthiessen's subjects, with his life as a minor thread. The biographical material took over, and Richardson later called himself "a bit of an accidental biographer". He never met Matthiessen.

The first person he interviewed, in November 2017, was Matthiessen's widow, Maria Eckhart. She initially declined to take part but later agreed to extended interviews. Richardson conducted more than 200 interviews in all, among them with Matthiessen's children, and worked from Matthiessen's journals, letters and unpublished manuscripts. To understand Matthiessen's Zen practice he spent several days in zazen at the Dai Bosatsu Zendo in the Catskill Mountains, and the Zen teacher Shinge Roshi checked the manuscript for errors. He also retraced part of the Himalayan route described in The Snow Leopard and developed pulmonary edema on the way. His requests for Matthiessen's CIA records were unsuccessful.

== Content ==
Richardson presents Matthiessen's life "not as an eclectic series of adventures but as a single, 86-year spiritual quest", in the words of the philosopher John Kaag. The book describes a childhood in a wealthy and emotionally distant New York family. At Yale, Matthiessen asked his parents to have his name removed from the Social Register, a request they ignored.

His Yale professor Norman Holmes Pearson recruited him to the Central Intelligence Agency in 1950. In June 1951 he sailed for Paris with his first wife, Patsy Southgate, and there helped found The Paris Review, in part to give himself a more substantial cover. A chapter of the book is devoted to the Paris posting. James Campbell of The Times Literary Supplement judged Richardson's account of the CIA's part in the magazine's beginnings "the most thorough to date", noting that it drew on diaries Matthiessen kept about his duties. Richardson finds it unlikely that the agency shaped the magazine's content. Matthiessen left the agency in 1953, as the first issue went to press.

Later chapters follow his travels and expeditions, his fiction, and his advocacy for Cesar Chavez and Leonard Peltier, including the libel suits that took In the Spirit of Crazy Horse (1983) off the shelves for years. Richardson also weighs criticism that Matthiessen's writing romanticized Indigenous peoples and relied on stereotypes.

Drawing on interviews with Matthiessen's family and lovers, the book shows that during the 1973 Himalayan expedition recounted in The Snow Leopard, a book presented as a journey of grief after the death of his second wife, Deborah Love, Matthiessen was writing to two women, one of whom became his third wife. He took up Zen through Love, studied with Eido Tai Shimano, Soen Nakagawa and Taizan Maezumi, and received dharma transmission from Bernie Glassman. The book also gives extended space to his decades-long search for Bigfoot, which filled six notebooks and an unpublished manuscript. It covers his three marriages, his repeated infidelities and his long absences from his children.

== Publication ==
Pantheon published the book on October 14, 2025, as a hardcover of 736 pages. The Chatto & Windus edition followed on October 16.

== Reception ==
Maggie Doherty of The New Yorker called it "an engaging one", "grounded in remarkably candid interviews with Matthiessen's family members and lovers". Sam Sacks described "a deeply researched and artfully executed biography" in The Wall Street Journal, and Pico Iyer found the narrative "fair-minded, grippingly paced, and tremendously readable". For Timothy Farrington in the Literary Review, the book was "even-handed, perceptive, smoothly narrated and exhaustively researched". Joy Williams wrote in The New York Review of Books that it was "a classic of biographical art and arc". Michael O'Donnell of The American Scholar praised its "extraordinary research", while noting that the Matthiessen it revealed was "a paragon of egotism, an absent father, a dreadful husband".

Dwight Garner of The New York Times was less enthusiastic. He wrote that the book "is dispassionate and thorough, but it is, like his subject, distant", and that it left Matthiessen's social life, including his friendships and dinner parties, underdeveloped. Campbell and Farrington both observed that it says little about Matthiessen's own reading or his view of rival writers. Guy Stagg of The Spectator called it "a rigorous and balanced account" but wrote that "it's hard to retain much respect for the subject".
