= Irving Brant =

American biographer, journalist, and historian

- Born: Irving Newton Brant; January 17, 1885; Walker, Iowa, U.S.
- Died: September 18, 1976 (aged 91)
- Education: University of Iowa (BA)
- Occupations: Biographer, journalist, historian

Irving Newton Brant (January 17, 1885 – September 18, 1976) was an American biographer, journalist, and historian.

== Early life ==
Brant was born on January 17, 1885, in Walker, Iowa, the son of David Brant, the editor of the local newspaper, and Ruth Hurd Brant. After attending local schools, he earned a BA in 1909 at the University of Iowa. In 1918 Brant became a reporter St. Louis Star-Times. He left the Star-Times in 1923, to write poetry, plays and children's novels. In 1930, Brant returned to the newspaper as an editorial writer.

== Journalism and writing ==
Brant wrote about conservation of natural resources for magazines and in 1930 was one of the first members of Rosalie Edge's Emergency Conservation Committee. Brant advised Roosevelt and Harold Ickes, Secretary of the Interior, on conservation issues, such as the protection of migratory ducks against the demands of farmers. In the late 1930s, Brant performed survey work that established the boundaries of the new Olympic National Park.

In 1936, Brant wrote Storm over the Constitution, defense of the constitutionality of the New Deal, which was challenged repeatedly in the U.S. Supreme Court. Brant's work reportedly encouraged Roosevelt in 1937 to send a bill to the U.S. Congress to enlarge the membership of the Supreme Court and overcome the conservative majority. The so-called court packing plan lost in Congress after a bitter fight.

== Madison biography ==
Brant's study of the Supreme Court led him to examine the legacy of president James Madison, who was largely ignored by historians at the time. When he first started writing the biography, he operated under the assumption that Jefferson overshadowed Madison's political contributions, especially influenced by the writings of the historian Henry Adams and his history of the United States. "I began writing the life of Madison without the slightest suspicion that the prevailing estimates of him were incorrect." While he had first focused on the then acknowledged contributions of Madison as architect of the Constitution and author of the Bill of Rights, he came to believe that Madison was equal in importance to Thomas Jefferson in creating the United States. "Not in the remotest fashion did I suspect that in their political symbiosis, Jefferson might owe as much to Madison as Madison to Jefferson". Brant wanted to rehabilitate Madison's reputation as a theorist of constitutional issues; to demonstrate Madison's mastery of practical politics; and to refute the states rights interpretation, which denied that the Founding Fathers considered the new country to be a single nation rather than a loose confederation of sovereign independent countries.

The first volume of the Madison biography was published in 1941, the sixth and final volume in 1961.

Brant died on September 18, 1976.

== Bibliography of Brant's writings ==
- James Madison: The Virginia Revolutionist. Vol. 1. (Indianapolis: Bobbs-Merrill, 1941).
- James Madison the Nationalist 1780-1787. Vol. 2. (Bobbs-Merrill, 1948). online
- James Madison Father of the Constitution 1787-1800. Vol. 3. (Bobbs-Merrill, 1950).
- "Madison: On the Separation of Church and State." William and Mary Quarterly (1951): 4-24. Online
- "James Madison and His Times." American Historical Review 57.4 (1952): 853–870. online
- James Madison: Secretary of State, 1800-1809. Vol. 4. (Bobbs-Merrill, 1953).
- "The Madison Heritage." New York University Law Review 35 (1960): 882+.
- James Madison; the President, 1809-1812. Vol. 5. (Bobbs-Merrill, 1956.)
- James Madison: Commander in Chief, 1812-1836. Vol. 6. (Bobbs-Merrill, 1961). online
- '"Madison and the War of 1812." The Virginia Magazine of History and Biography 74.1 (1966): 51–67.
- The Fourth President: A life of James Madison. (Bobbs-Merrill, 1970), abridged edition of his six volume biography
- "Adventures in Conservation Putting It Up to FDR." Journal of Forest History 32.1 (1988): 32–41.
- Adventures in conservation with Franklin D. Roosevelt (1989) online
- Irving Brant's papers are housed at the University of Iowa Special Collection.

== Sources ==
- Keene, Ann T. "Brant, Irving Newton (17 January 1885–18 September 1976)" American National Biography (1999) online
- Leibiger, ed. (2012). A Companion to James Madison and James Monroe. John Wiley & Sons. pp. 68–70. ISBN 9781118281437. on Brant's interpretation of Madison's radical shift 1787-1792
