= Samuel Scheps =

Samuel Scheps (1904–1999) was a Zionist activist.

== Summary ==
Born May 19, 1904 in Łódź (Russian Poland), Samuel Scheps was the son of the industrialist Maximilian Scheps and Rosa née Schwarzmann. He was married on 9 October 1928 to Lily Scheps. They had three children: Dorith (1930), Marc (1932) and Ruth (1945). He was naturalized a Swiss citizen in Basel-City in 1931.

== Studies ==
- 1921–1922 : philosophy and history at the Jagiellonian University in Kraków.
- 1922–1923 : philosophy, history, sociology and political economy at the Friedrich Wilhelm of Berlin University. Simultaneously, specialization in Judaic sciences at the Hochschule für die Wissenschaft des Judentums.
- 1924–1926 : doctoral studies at the University of Basel.
- 1927: gets his PhD rerum politicarum (summa cum laude) for his thesis "Die Währungs - und Notenbankpolitik der Republik Polen" ("the monetary and banking policy of the Republic of Poland").
- 1926–1927 : specialization in economic policy at the London School of Economics.

== Zionist activities ==
By the mid-1920s, Samuel Scheps was a committed Zionist. In Basel, he was as early as 1928 Director, then Vice-President of the Swiss Zionist organization until 1946. He contributed to bringing together the Jewish communities of Western and Eastern Europe, and founded the Ivri Houg for Hebrew and Jewish culture. He was also involved in the creation of a Committee from which was born the Association of friends of the Hebrew University of Jerusalem Switzerland.

In 1935 he became Director of the Swiss Jewish National Fund, and in 1937, Director of the Swiss Palestine Office - branch of the Jewish Agency which organized emigration to Palestine.

In 1939, the Palestinian Agency was transferred to Geneva, where Samuel moved with his family. During the Nazi years, Samuel Scheps had an important role in assisting refugees and allowing them to emigrate: to achieve this, he obtained necessary certificates and money for countless individuals and families, whose lives he saved. He organized five rescue vessels. At the risk of his life, he travelled around Germany and in the occupied countries (Austria, Hungary, Romania, Yugoslavia), to negotiate opportunities for emigration.

In 1942, he was among the first to learn about the "Final Solution" from the German industrialist Eduard Schulte (1891–1966).

In 1945 he participated in the Organization of the large first post-war aliyah (immigration to Palestine) as well as searching for survivors.

In 1946 Samuel Scheps withdrew from all of his public functions while remaining Director Emeritus of the Palestinian Office until 1950. As such he issued visas for aliya and tourism until the establishment of diplomatic relations between the Switzerland and Israel in the spring of 1949.

== Economic activities ==
During the war of independence, Samuel Scheps offered his skills and knowledge of international economics to the young state of Israel. He was notably put in charge by the Israeli Government of supplying food both to the Israel Defense Forces and to communities across the country. He participated in the Organization of Israeli agricultural exports, he was the Citrus Marketing Board's representative in Switzerland where he founded in 1946 the firm Socopa SA in Geneva, which operated until 1962. During these years, Samuel Scheps represented Israel at the European Economic Community, and he participated in the creation of the Swiss-Israel Chamber of Commerce while simultaneously acting as an Advisor financial. In 1959, he co-founded the Banque de Crédit International Geneve (ICB) in Geneva, together with Mossad agent Tibor Rosenbaum and disputed financier Bernard Cornfield for which he had the role of Vice President.

Samuel Scheps is the author of numerous articles, essays and monographs in German, Polish, Hebrew and French, in various areas: economy, history, literature and philosophy. He attached particular attention to highlight all forms of cultural osmosis between Polish Jews and Polish society around them. Moreover, he summarized his actions helping to rescue European Jews in the years between 1933 and 1945 in an article: "Basel, Geneva and Istanbul - Rescue Centres and Aliya, 1933-1945" (SSIP 43, Basel, summer 1976;) (Das Neue Israel, October 1976).

His personal library of works on Economics and Judaism are located at the University of Basel. His archives were transferred to the Department Archiv für Zeitgeschichte of the ETH (Federal Polytechnic School) in Zürich, except those concerning Zionism, which are located in the Central Zionist Archives in Jerusalem.

== Titles and appointments ==
- From 1964 to 1974, he chaired the Swiss Association of Friends of the Hebrew University of Jerusalem.
- In 1970, he was appointed Honorary Governor of the Hebrew University of Jerusalem.
- In 1994, he became the first Honorary President of the Zionist Federation of Switzerland.
- In 1995, he received the cross of officer of the order of merit of the Republic of Poland.
- In 1997, the Hebrew University of Jerusalem granted him the Mount Scopus prize.
