= Frida Scheps Weinstein =

French author (born 1934)

Frida Scheps Weinstein (born November 1934) is a French author. Her book A Hidden Childhood: A Jewish Girl's Sanctuary in a French Convent was a finalist for the Pulitzer Prize for Biography or Autobiography.

== Biography ==
Scheps Weinstein was born in 1934 to immigrant Jewish-Russian parents in Paris, but was teased for looking German. By the age of six, she was sent away to live in the care of the Red Cross at the Château de Beaujeu, a convent school. As she grew up safe from The Holocaust, Scheps Weinstein began to forget her Jewish background and asked to become baptized as a Catholic. That never happened as her mother objected. Upon the conclusion of the war, she reconciled with her father in Jerusalem, where she received her education and enlisted in the Israel Defense Forces.

Once Scheps Weinstein completed her army service in 1960, she moved to the United States and worked for Agence France-Presse. While in America, she published a memoir of her memories from The Holocaust, written in French and published by Balland, titled #J'habitais rue des Jardins Saint-Paul". Rights were bought in America by Hill and Wang, translated by Barbara Loeb Kennedy, and published as A Hidden Childhood: A Jewish Girl's Sanctuary in a French Convent 1942-1945;it then was a nominated finalist for the Pulitzer Prize for Biography or Autobiography.
