= Mark Lynton History Prize =

Award

- Description: Excellence in historical writing combining scholarship and felicity of expression
- Country: United States
- Presented by: Columbia University School of Journalism & Nieman Foundation
- Reward: $10,000
- Website: journalism.columbia.edu/lukas

The Mark Lynton History Prize is an annual $10,000 award given to a book "of history, on any subject, that best combines intellectual or scholarly distinction with felicity of expression". The prize is one of three awards given as part of the J. Anthony Lukas Book Prize administered by the Nieman Foundation for Journalism and by the Columbia University School of Journalism.

== History ==
The prize is named in honor of Mark Lynton, a refugee from Nazi Germany, Second World War officer, and automobile industry executive. In 1939, Lynton was a Jewish German-born student studying history at Cambridge, when he and other German nationals were rounded up and interned in detention camps in England and Canada as enemy aliens, suspected of being Nazi sympathizers. When Lynton was released, he joined the British Army, and became a tank commander.

He was later promoted to the rank of Major in the occupying force, the Army of the Rhine, where he helped interrogate high-ranking Nazi officers. Lynton memorialized his odyssey in his memoir, Accidental Journey: A Cambridge Internee's Memoir of World War II. The prize was established by his wife, Marion, children, Lili and Michael, and grandchildren, Lucinda, Eloise Lynton and Maisie Lynton, to honor Lynton who was an avid reader of history. The Lynton family has underwritten the Lukas Prize Project since its inception in 1998.

== Recipients ==
Award winners and finalists
Year	Author	Title	Result	Ref.
1999	Adam Hochschild	King Leopold's Ghost: A Story of Greed, Terror and Heroism in Colonial Africa	Winner	
2000	John W. Dower	Embracing Defeat: Japan in the Wake of World War II	Winner	
2001	Fred Anderson	Crucible of War: The Seven Years' War and the Fate of Empire in British North America, 1754–1766	Winner	
2002	Mark Roseman	A Past in Hiding: Memory and Survival in Nazi Germany	Winner	
2003	Robert W. Harms	The Diligent: A Voyage Through the Worlds of Slave Trade	Winner	
2004	Rebecca Solnit	River of Shadows: Eadweard Muybridge and the Technological Wild West	Winner	
2005	Richard Steven Street	Beasts of the Field: A Narrative History of California Farmworkers, 1769–1913	Winner	
2006	Megan Marshall	The Peabody Sisters: Three Women who Ignited American Romanticism	Winner	
2007	James T. Campbell	Middle Passages: African American Journeys to Africa, 1787–2005	Winner	
2008	Peter Silver	Our Savage Neighbors: How Indian War Transformed Early America	Winner	
2009	Timothy Brook	Vermeer's Hat: The Seventeenth Century and the Dawn of the Global World	Winner	
2010	James Davidson	The Greeks and Greek Love: A Bold New Exploration of the Ancient World	Winner	
2011	Isabel Wilkerson	The Warmth of Other Suns: The Epic Story of America's Great Migration	Winner	
2011	Patrick Wilcken	Claude Levi-Strauss: The Poet in His Laboratory	Finalist	
2012	Sophia Rosenfeld	Common Sense: A Political History	Winner	
2012	Michael Willrich	Pox: An American History	Finalist	
2012	Craig Harline	Conversions: Two Family Stories from the Reformation and Modern America	Finalist	
2013	Robert Caro	The Passage of Power: The Years of Lyndon Johnson	Winner	
2013	David Nasaw	The Patriarch: The Remarkable Life and Turbulent Times of Joseph P. Kennedy	Finalist	
2014	Jill Lepore	Book of Ages: The Life and Opinions of Jane Franklin	Winner	
2014	Christopher Clark	The Sleepwalkers: How Europe Went to War in 1914	Finalist	
2015	Harold Holzer	Lincoln and the Power of the Press: The War for Public Opinion	Winner	
2015	Andrew Roberts	Napoleon: A Life	Finalist	
2016	Nikolaus Wachsmann	KL: A History of the Nazi Concentration Camps	Winner	
2016	Timothy Snyder	Black Earth: The Holocaust as History and Warning	Finalist	
2016	Sean McMeekin	The Ottoman Endgame: War, Revolution, and the Making of the Modern Middle East, 1908-1923	Shortlist	
2016	Jan Jarboe Russell	The Train to Crystal City: FDR’s Secret Prison Exchange Program and America’s Only Family Internment Camp During World War II	Shortlist	
2016	T. J. Stiles	Custer's Trials: A Life on the Frontier of a New America	Shortlist	
2017	Tyler Anbinder	City of Dreams: The 400-Year Epic History of Immigrant New York	Winner	
2017	Adam Hochschild	Spain in Our Hearts: Americans in the Spanish Civil War, 1936-1939	Finalist	
2017	Ethan Michaeli	The Defender: How the Legendary Black Newspaper Changed America	Shortlist	
2017	Joan Quigley	Just Another Southern Town: Mary Church Terrell and the Struggle for Racial Justice in the Nation’s Capital	Shortlist	
2017	David Reid	The Brazen Age: New York City and the American Empire - Politics, Art and Bohemia	Shortlist	
2018	Stephen Kotkin	Stalin: Waiting for Hitler, 1929-1941	Winner	
2018	Caroline Fraser	Prairie Fires: The American Dreams of Laura Ingalls Wilder	Finalist	
2018	Edward L. Ayers	The Thin Light of Freedom: The Civil War and Emancipation in the Heart of America	Shortlist	
2018	Jonathan Eig	Ali: A Life	Shortlist	
2018	Frances FitzGerald	The Evangelicals: The Struggle to Shape America	Shortlist	
2019	Jeffrey C. Stewart	The New Negro: The Life of Alain Locke	Winner	
2019	Andrew Delbanco	The War Before the War: Fugitive Slaves and the Struggle for America's Soul from the Revolution to the Civil War	Winner	
2019	David W. Blight	Frederick Douglass: Prophet of Freedom	Finalist	
2019	Edith Sheffer	Asperger's Children	Shortlist	
2019	Steven J. Zipperstein	Pogrom: Kishinev and the Tilt of History	Shortlist	
2020	Kerri K. Greenidge	Black Radical: The Life and Times of William Monroe Trotter	Winner	
2020	Daniel Immerwahr	How to Hide an Empire: A History of the Greater United States	Finalist	
2020	Carrie Gibson	El Norte: The Epic and Forgotten Story of Hispanic North America	Shortlist	
2020	Pekka Hämäläinen	Lakota America	Shortlist	
2020	Brendan Simms	Hitler	Shortlist	
2021	William G. Thomas III	A Question Of Freedom: The Families Who Challenged Slavery from the Nation's Founding to the Civil War	Winner	
2021	Martha S. Jones	Vanguard: How Black Women Broke Barriers, Won the Vote, and Insisted on Equality for All	Finalist	
2021	Walter Johnson	The Broken Heart of America	Shortlist	
2021	Les Payne and Tamara Payne	The Dead Are Arising	Shortlist	
2021	Géraldine Schwarz	Those Who Forget	Shortlist	
2022	Jane Rogoyska	Surviving Katyń: Stalin's Polish Massacre and the Search for Truth	Winner	
2022	Katie Booth	The Invention of Miracles: Language, Power, and Alexander Graham Bell’s Quest to End Deafness	Finalist	
2022	Noah Feldman	The Broken Constitution: Lincoln, Slavery, and the Refounding of America	Shortlist	
2022	Amanda Frost	You Are Not American: Citizenship Stripping from Dred Scott to the Dreamers	Shortlist	
2022	Tiya Miles	All That She Carried: The Journey of Ashley's Sack, a Black Family Keepsake	Shortlist	
2023	Deborah Cohen	Last Call at the Hotel Imperial: The Reporters Who Took on a World at War	Winner	
2023	Kelly Lytle Hernández	Bad Mexicans: Race, Empire & Revolution in the Borderlands	Finalist	
2023	Beverly Gage	G-Man: J. Edgar Hoover and the Making of the American Century	Shortlist	
2023	Kerri K. Greenidge	The Grimkes: The Legacy of Slavery in an American Family	Shortlist	
2023	Pekka Hämäläinen	Indigenous Continent: The Epic Contest for North America	Shortlist	
2024	Ned Blackhawk	The Rediscovery of America: Native Peoples and the Unmaking of U.S. History	Winner	
2024	Gary J. Bass	Judgment at Tokyo: World War II on Trial and the Making of Modern Asia	Finalist	
2024	Jonathan Eig	King: A Life	Shortlist	
2024	Dylan C. Penningroth	Before the Movement: The Hidden History of Black Civil Rights	Shortlist	
2024	Yepoka Yeebo	Anansi’s Gold: The Man Who Looted the West, Outfoxed Washington, and Swindled the World	Shortlist	
2025	Kathleen DuVal	Native Nations: A Millennium in North America	Winner	
2025	Edda L. Fields-Black	COMBEE: Harriet Tubman, the Combahee River Raid, and Black Freedom During the Civil War	Finalist	
2025	Seth Rockman	Plantation Goods: A Material History of American Slavery	Finalist	
2025	Justene Hill Edwards	Savings and Trust: The Rise and Betrayal of the Freedman’s Bank	Shortlist	
2025	Michael Waters	The Other Olympians: Fascism, Queerness, and the Making of Modern Sports	Shortlist	
2026	William Dalrymple	The Golden Road: How Ancient India Transformed the World	Winner	
2026	Siddharth Kara	The Zorg: A Tale of Greed and Murder That Inspired the Abolition of Slavery	Finalist	

== See also ==
- List of history awards
