= Plutarch Award =

Literary award for biographies

The Plutarch Award, established in 2013, is an annual literary award for biographies presented by the Biographers International Organization. It is named in honor of Plutarch, the Greek historian who is credited as the father of biography.

== Recipients ==
Plutarch Award winners and finalists
Year	Author(s)	Title	Result	Ref.
2013	Robert Caro	The Passage of Power	Winner	
2013	Deirdre Bair	Saul Steinberg: A Biography	Nominee	
2013	Lisa Cohen	All We Know: Three Lives	Nominee	
2013	Timothy Egan	Short Nights of the Shadow Catcher: The Epic Life and Immortal Photographs of Edward Curtis	Nominee	
2013	Alice Kessler-Harris	A Difficult Woman: The Challenging Life and Times of Lillian Hellman	Nominee	
2013	David Maraniss	Barack Obama: The Story	Nominee	
2013	John Matteson	The Lives of Margaret Fuller	Nominee	
2013	Tom Reiss	The Black Count: Glory, Revolution, Betrayal, and the Real Count of Monte Cristo	Nominee	
2013	William Souder	On a Farther Shore: The Life and Legacy of Rachel Carson	Nominee	
2013	Rachel L. Swarns	American Tapestry: The Story of the Black, White and Multiracial Ancestors of Michelle Obama	Nominee	
2014	Linda Leavell	Holding On Upside Down: The Life and Work of Marianne Moore	Winner	
2014	Scott Anderson	Lawrence in Arabia	Nominee	
2014	Marie Arana	Bolivar: American Liberator	Nominee	
2014	A. Scott Berg	Wilson	Nominee	
2014	Ben Bradlee Jr.	The Kid: The Immortal Life of Ted Williams	Nominee	
2014	Leo Damrosch	Jonathan Swift: His Life and His World	Nominee	
2014	Lucy Hughes-Hallett	Gabriele D'Annunzio: Poet, Seducer, and Preacher of War	Nominee	
2014	Brian Jay Jones	Jim Henson: The Biography	Nominee	
2014	Jill Lepore	Book of Ages: The Life and Opinions of Jane Franklin	Nominee	
2014	Ray Monk	Robert Oppenheimer: A Life Inside the Center	Nominee	
2015	Hermione Lee	Penelope Fitzgerald: A Life	Winner	
2015	Helen Rappaport	The Romanov Sisters: The Lost Lives of Daughters of Nicholas and Alexandria	Finalist	
2015	Nigel Hamilton	The Mantle of Command: FDR at War, 1941-1942	Finalist	
2015	John Lahr	Tennessee Williams: Mad Pilgrimage of the Flesh	Finalist	
2016	Rosemary Sullivan	Stalin’s Daughter: The Extraordinary and Tumultuous Life of Svetlana Alliluyeva	Winner	
2016	Sonia Purnell	Clementine: The Life of Mrs. Winston Churchill	Nominee	
2016	T. J. Stiles	Custer's Trials: A Life on the Frontier of a New America	Nominee	
2016	Jay Parini	Empire of Self: A Life of Gore Vidal	Nominee	
2016	Anne Heller	Hannah Arendt: A Life in Dark Times	Nominee	
2016	Emily Bingham	Irrepressible: A Jazz Age Life of Henrietta Bingham	Nominee	
2016	Betty Boyd Caroli	Lady Bird and Lyndon: The Hidden Story of a Marriage	Nominee	
2016	Irwin F. Gellman	The President and the Apprentice: Eisenhower and Nixon 1952-1961	Nominee	
2016	Cathy Curtis	Restless Ambition: Grace Hartigan, Painter	Nominee	
2016	Peter Guralnick	Sam Phillips: The Man Who Invented Rock 'n' Roll	Nominee	
2017	Ruth Franklin	Shirley Jackson: A Rather Haunted Life	Winner	
2017	Frances Wilson	Guilty Thing: A Life of Thomas De Quincey	Finalist	
2017	Volker Ullrich, trans. by Jefferson Chase	Hitler: Ascent, 1889-1939	Finalist	
2017	Louisa Thomas	Louisa: The Extraordinary Life of Mrs. Adams	Finalist	
2017	Larry Tye	Bobby Kennedy: The Making of a Liberal Icon	Nominee	
2017	Alex Beam	The Feud: Vladimir Nabokov, Edmund Wilson, and the End of a Beautiful Friendship	Nominee	
2017	Joseph Lelyveld	His Final Battle: The Last Months of Franklin Roosevelt	Nominee	
2017	Ruth Scurr	John Aubrey, My Own Life	Nominee	
2017	Reiner Stach, trans. by Shelley Frisch	Kafka: The Early Years	Nominee	
2017	Simon Callow	Orson Welles, Volume 3: One-Man Band	Nominee	
2018	Caroline Fraser	Prairie Fires: The American Dreams of Laura Ingalls Wilder	Winner	
	Ron Chernow	Grant	Nominee	
	Jonathan Eig	Ali: A Life	Nominee	
	John Farrell	Richard Nixon: The Life	Nominee	
	Andrzej Franaszek, trans. by Aleksandra Parker and Michael Parker	Milosz: A Biography	Nominee	
	Francine Klagsbrun	Lioness: Golda Meir and the Nation of Israel	Nominee	
	Megan Marshall	Elizabeth Bishop: A Miracle for Breakfast	Nominee	
	Rosalind Rosenberg	Jane Crow: The Life of Pauli Murray	Nominee	
	Victor Sebestyen	Lenin: The Man, the Dictator, and the Master of Terror	Nominee	
	William Taubman	Gorbachev: His Life and Times	Nominee	
2019	David W. Blight	Frederick Douglass: Prophet of Freedom	Winner	
2019	Craig Brown	Ninety-Nine Glimpses of Princess Margaret	Nominee	
2019	Julie Dobrow	After Emily: Two Remarkable Women and the Legacy of America's Greatest Poet	Nominee	
2019	Lindsey Hilsum	In Extremis: The Life and Death of the War Correspondent Marie Colvin	Nominee	
2019	Victor Sebestyen	Inseparable: The Original Siamese Twins and Their Rendezvous with American History	Nominee	
2019	David Levering Lewis	The Improbable Wendell Willkie: The Businessman Who Saved the Republican Party and Conceived a New World Order	Nominee	
2019	Patricia O'Toole	The Moralist: Woodrow Wilson and the World He Made	Nominee	
2019	Andrew Roberts	Churchill: Walking with Destiny	Nominee	
2019	Hilary Spurling	Anthony Powell: Dancing to the Music of Time	Nominee	
2019	Jeffrey C. Stewart	The New Negro: The Life of Alain Locke	Nominee	
2020	Sonia Purnell	A Woman of No Importance: The Untold Story of the American Spy Who Helped Win World War II	Winner	
2020	Sidney Blumenthal	All the Powers of Earth: The Political Life of Abraham Lincoln, 1856-1860	Finalist	
2020	Jacquelyn Dowd Hall	Sisters and Rebels: A Struggle for the Soul of America	Finalist	
2020	Charles King	Gods of the Upper Air: How a Circle of Renegade Anthropologists Reinvented Race, Sex, and Gender in the Twentieth Century	Finalist	
2020	George Packer	Our Man: Richard Holbrooke and the End of the American Century	Finalist	
2021	A. N. Wilson	The Mystery of Charles Dickens	Winner	
2021	Les Payne and Tamara Payne	The Dead Are Arising: The Life of Malcolm X	Finalist	
2021	Jonathan Alter	His Very Best: Jimmy Carter: A Life	Finalist	
2021	Ted Widmer	Lincoln on the Verge: Thirteen Days to Washington	Finalist	
2021	Martha Ackmann	These Fevered Days: Ten Pivotal Moments in the Making of Emily Dickinson	Finalist	
2021	Steven Heyman	The Planter of Modern Life: Louis Bromfield and the Seeds of a Food Revolution	Longlist	
2021	Hilary Holladay	The Power of Adrienne Rich: A Biography	Longlist	
2021	David S. Reynolds	Abe: Abraham Lincoln in His Times	Longlist	
2021	Steven C. Smith	Music by Max Steiner: The Epic Life of Hollywood's Most Influential Composer	Longlist	
2021	Volker Ullrich, trans. by Jefferson Chase	Hitler: Downfall 1939-1945	Longlist	
2022	Frances Wilson	Burning Man: The Trials of D. H. Lawrence	Winner	
2022	Rebecca Donner	All the Frequent Troubles of Our Days: The True Story of the American Woman at the Heart of the German Resistance to Hitler	Shortlist	
2022	Robert Elder	Calhoun: American Heretic	Shortlist	
2022	Fiona Sampson	Two-Way Mirror: The Life of Elizabeth Barrett Browning	Shortlist	
2022	Mark Stevens and Annalyn Swan	Francis Bacon: Revelations	Shortlist	
2022	Claude A. Clegg III	The Black President: Hope and Fury in the Age of Obama	Longlist	
2022	Janice P. Nimura	The Doctors Blackwell: How Two Pioneering Sisters Brought Medicine to Women and Women to Medicine	Longlist	
2022	Matthew Sturgis	Oscar Wilde: A Life	Longlist	
2022	Dorothy Wickenden	The Agitators: Three Friends Who Fought for Abolition and Women’s Rights	Longlist	
2022	Richard Zenith	Pessoa: A Biography	Longlist	
2023	Jennifer Homans	Mr. B: George Balanchine’s 20th Century	Winner	
2023	Beverly Gage	G-Man: J. Edgar Hoover and the Making of the American Century	Shortlist	
2023	Jon Meacham	And There Was Light: Abraham Lincoln and the American Struggle	Shortlist	
2023	Jane Ridley	George V: Never a Dull Moment	Shortlist	
2023	Katherine Rundell	Super-Infinite: The Transformations of John Donne	Shortlist	
2023	Tomiko Brown-Nagin	Civil Rights Queen: Constance Baker Motley and the Struggle for Equality	Longlist	
2023	John A. Farrell	Ted Kennedy: A Life	Longlist	
2023	Paul Fisher	The Grand Affair: John Singer Sargent in His World	Longlist	
2023	Stacy Schiff	The Revolutionary: Samuel Adams	Longlist	
2023	Miranda Seymour	I Used to Live Here Once: The Haunted Life of Jean Rhys	Longlist	
2024	Yepoka Yeebo	Anansi’s Gold: The Man Who Looted the West, Outfoxed Washington, and Swindled the World	Winner	
2024	Jonathan Eig	King: A Life	Shortlist	
2024	Howard Fishman	To Anyone Who Ever Asks: The Life, Music, and Mystery of Connie Converse	Shortlist	
2024	Lisa M. Hamilton	The Hungry Season: A Journey of War, Love, and Survival	Shortlist	
2024	Prudence Peiffer	The Slip: The New York City Street That Changed American Art Forever	Shortlist	
2024	Sally H. Jacobs	Althea: The Life of Tennis Champion Althea Gibson	Nominee	
2024	Larry Rohter	Into the Amazon: The Life of Cândido Rondon, Trailblazing Explorer, Scientist, Statesman, and Conservationist	Nominee	
2024	Barbara D. Savage	Merze Tate: The Global Odyssey of a Black Woman Scholar	Nominee	
2024	Willard Spiegelman	Nothing Stays Put: The Life and Poetry of Amy Clampitt	Nominee	
2024	Jonny Steinberg	Winnie and Nelson: Portrait of a Marriage	Nominee	
2025	Cynthia Carr	Candy Darling: Dreamer, Icon, Superstar	Winner	
2025	Lucy Hughes-Hallett	The Scapegoat: The Brilliant Brief Life of the Duke of Buckingham	Winner	
2025	Stephanie Gorton	The Icon & the Idealist: Margaret Sanger, Mary Ware Dennett, and the Rivalry That Brought Birth Control to America	Shortlist	
2025	David Greenberg	John Lewis: A Life, and Alexis Pauline Gumbs for Survival Is A Promise: The Eternal Life of Audre Lorde	Shortlist	
2025	Adam Shatz	The Rebel’s Clinic: The Revolutionary Lives of Frantz Fanon	Shortlist	
2025	Max Boot	Reagan: His Life and Legend	Longlist	
2025	Margalit Fox	The Talented Mrs. Mandelbaum: The Rise and Fall of an American Organized-Crime Boss	Longlist	
2025	Heath Hardage Lee	The Mysterious Mrs. Nixon: The Life and Times of Washington’s Most Private First Lady	Longlist	
2025	Jackie Wullschläger	Monet: The Restless Vision	Longlist	
2026	Nicholas Boggs	Baldwin: A Love Story	Longlist	
2026	Sue Prideaux	Wild Thing: A Life of Paul Gauguin	Longlist	
2026	Daniel Brook	The Einstein of Sex: Dr. Magnus Hirschfeld, Visionary of Weimar Berlin	Longlist	
2026	Kate Culkin	Emerson’s Daughters: Ellen Tucker Emerson, Edith Emerson Forbes, and Their Family Legacy	Longlist	
2026	Ruth Franklin	The Many Lives of Anne Frank	Longlist	
2026	Howard W. French	The Second Emancipation: Nkrumah, Pan-Africanism, and Global Blackness at High Tide	Longlist	
2026	Max Perry Mueller	Wakara’s America: The Life and Legacy of a Native Founder of the American West	Longlist	
2026	Amanda Vaill	Pride and Pleasure: The Schuyler Sisters in an Age of Revolution	Longlist	
2026	Francesca Wade	Gertrude Stein: An Afterlife	Longlist	
2026	Graham Watson	The Invention of Charlotte Brontë	Longlist	
