= Jackie Robinson (miniseries) =

2016 television documentary miniseries by Ken Burns

- Genre: Documentary
- Written by: David McMahon; Sarah Burns
- Directed by: Ken Burns, Sarah Burns & David McMahon
- Starring: Jamie Foxx
- Narrated by: Keith David
- Theme music composer: Wynton Marsalis; Doug Wamble
- Country of origin: United States
- Original language: English
- No. of episodes: 2

Production
- Producers: Sarah Burns; David McMahon; Ken Burns
- Cinematography: Buddy Squires
- Editors: Lewis Erskine, Ted Raviv
- Running time: 4 hours
- Production company: Florentine Films

Original release
- Network: PBS
- Release: April 11 – April 12, 2016

Jackie Robinson is a 2016 American television documentary miniseries directed by Ken Burns. It debuted as a two-part series, the first half premiering on April 11, 2016, and the second half airing the following night. It concerns the life of Jackie Robinson, the first African-American to play in the major leagues of baseball in the modern era.

== Actors and historians ==
The documentary series is narrated by Keith David, and features the voice of Jamie Foxx as Jackie Robinson. A large group of noted commentators give background information. They include:

- Harry Belafonte
- Howard Bryant
- Ed Charles
- Gerald Early
- Jonathan Eig
- Carl Erskine
- Willie Mays
- Barack Obama
- Michelle Obama
- David Robinson (Jackie's son)
- Rachel Robinson (Jackie's widow)
- Sharon Robinson (Jackie's daughter)
- John Thorn
- George Will
- Yohuru Williams

== Episodes ==
1. "Jackie Robinson: Part I"
2. "Jackie Robinson: Part II"

== See also ==
- List of baseball films
