= Audie Award for Non-Fiction Narrator =

Literary award for audiobook

The Audie Award for Non-Fiction Narrator is one of the Audie Awards presented annually by the Audio Publishers Association (APA). It awards excellence in audiobook narration for a non-fiction audiobook released in a given year.

Established in 2024, the category replaced the categories for Best Male and Female Narrator, alongside the award for Best Fiction Narrator.

== Recipients ==
Award winners and finalists
Award Year	Audiobook	Author(s)	Narrator(s)	Publisher	Result	Ref.
2024 29th	King: A Life (2023)	Jonathan Eig	Dion Graham	Macmillan Audio	Winner	
2024 29th	The Art Thief	Michael Finkel	Edoardo Ballerini	Penguin Random House Audio	Finalist	
2024 29th	The Woman in Me	Britney Spears	Michelle Williams	Simon & Schuster Audio	Finalist	
2024 29th	The Lost Sons of Omaha	Joe Sexton	Dion Graham	Simon & Schuster Audio	Finalist	
2024 29th	The Wager (2023)	David Grann	Dion Graham	Penguin Random House Audio	Finalist	
2025 30th	Candy Darling	Cynthia Carr	Justin Vivian Bond	Macmillan Audio	Winner	
2025 30th	Revenge of the Tipping Point (2024)	Malcolm Gladwell	Malcolm Gladwell	Hachette Audio and Pushkin Industries	Finalist	
2025 30th	The Wide Wide Sea	Hampton Sides	Peter Noble	Penguin Random House Audio	Finalist	
2025 30th	Coming Home	Brittney Griner and Michelle Burford	Andia Winslow	Penguin Random House Audio	Finalist	
2026 31st	Ghosts of Hiroshima	Charles Pellegrino	Martin Sheen	Blackstone Publishing	Finalist	
2026 31st	Remember Us	Dion Graham	Robert M. Edsel and Bret Witter	HarperAudio	Finalist	
2026 31st	Truly	Lionel Richie	Blair Underwood	HarperAudio	Winner	
2026 31st	The Women's Orchestra of Auschwitz	Anne Sebba	Helen Stern	Macmillan Audio	Finalist	
2026 31st	The Zorg	Siddharth Kara	Dion Graham	Macmillan Audio	Finalist	
