= Michael G. Long =

American academic

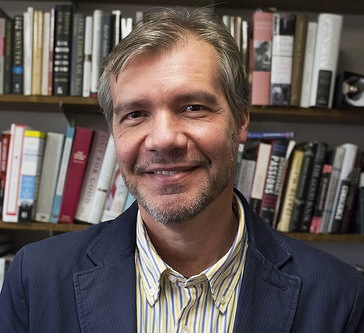
- Occupation: Academic

Michael G. Long is a former Associate Professor of Religious Studies and Peace and Conflict Studies at Elizabethtown College.

== Career ==
Long is the author or editor of books on civil rights, religion, and politics, including Jackie Robinson: A Spiritual Biography; Gay Is Good: The Life and Letters of Gay Rights Pioneer Franklin Kameny; Beyond Home Plate: Jackie Robinson on Life after Baseball; Martin Luther King, Jr., Homosexuality, and the Early Gay Rights Movement; and Marshalling Justice: The Early Civil Rights Letters of Thurgood Marshall.

Long has written for the Los Angeles Times, the Chicago Tribune, USA Today, the Afro, the Huffington Post, the Chicago Sun-Times, New York Daily News, and the Pittsburgh Post-Gazette, and his work has been featured or reviewed in or on NPR, The New York Times, the Washington Post, the Los Angeles Times, the Boston Globe, USA Today, Salon, CNN, Book Forum, Ebony/Jet, and other newspapers and journals.

Long lives in Lower Allen Township (PA). He received a Ph.D from Emory University in 2000.

== Selected works ==
- Against Us, But for Us: Martin Luther King Jr., and the State, Mercer University Press 2002, ISBN 0-86554-768-8
- Martin Luther King Jr. on Create Living, Chalice Press 2004, ISBN 0-8272-0496-5
- Billy Graham and the Beloved Community: America's Evangelist and the Dream of Martin Luther King, Jr., Palgrave Macmillan 2006, ISBN 1-4039-6869-1
- God and Country: Diverse Perspectives on Christianity and Patriotism, Palgrave Macmillan 2007, ISBN 1-4039-7300-8
- First Class Citizenship: The Civil Rights Letters of Jackie Robinson, Times Books 2007, ISBN 0-8050-8710-9
- The Legacy of Billy Graham: Critical Reflections on America's Great Evangelist, Westminster John Knox Press 2008, ISBN 0-664-23138-1
- I Must Resist: Bayard Rustin's Life in Letters (editor), City Lights 2012, ISBN 0-8728-6578-9
- Peaceful Neighbor: Discovering the Countercultural Mister Rogers, Westminster John Knox Press 2015, ISBN 0-664-26047-0
- We the Resistance: Documenting a History of Nonviolent Protest in the United States, (City Lights, 2019) ISBN 9780872867567
- Troublemaker for Justice: The Story of Bayard Rustin, the Man Behind the March on Washington, (City Lights, 2019) ISBN 9780872867659
- Race Man: Selected Works, 1960-2015 (editor), City Lights Publishers 2020 ISBN 9780872867949
- Bayard Rustin: A Legacy of Protest and Politics (editor), NYU Press 2023 ISBN 9781479818495
- More than a Dream: the radical march on Washington for jobs and freedom (2023, Farrar, Straus and Giroux), with Yohuru Williams
