= Fred Guttenberg =

American activist and gun control advocate

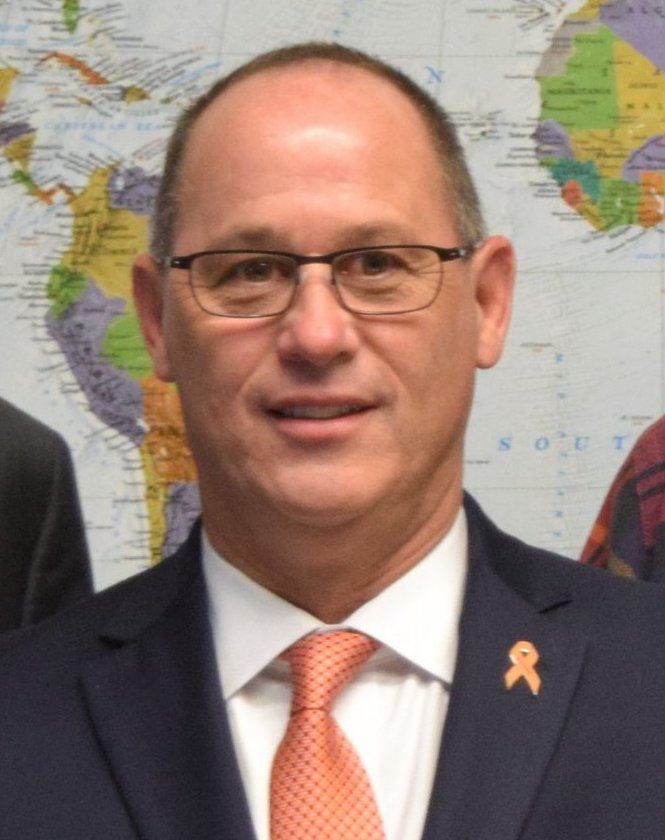
- Guttenberg attends the 2020 State of the Union Address.
- Born: December 2, 1965 (age 60); East Northport, New York, U.S.
- Movement: Anti-gun violence
- Children: 2 (including Jamie)

Fred Guttenberg (born December 2, 1965) is an American activist against gun violence. His 14-year-old daughter, Jaime, was murdered in the Stoneman Douglas High School shooting in Parkland, Florida on February 14, 2018. His son, Jesse, also a student at the school, ran from the shooting to meet him at a nearby store. He learned about his daughter's death from a friend who is a Coral Springs SWAT officer. Jessica McBride, for the website Heavy, described him as "one of the strongest voices for changes to gun laws in the wake of the mass shooting".

== Activism ==
The day after the shooting, Guttenberg spoke out for gun control, stating "Don't tell me there's no such thing as gun violence. It happened in Parkland". Before the nationally televised CNN town hall he criticized President Donald Trump for not saying guns are a problem in a White House listening session, saying "My daughter was hunted last week" and "I am enraged". During the CNN town hall he confronted Florida Republican Senator Marco Rubio for his position on guns.

According to a report in The Guardian, Guttenberg's priorities include raising the minimum age to buy guns, adding a waiting period before gun sales, having a no-loopholes policy for a mandatory background check of the gun buyer, and banning high-capacity ammunition magazines and bump stocks. While he would prefer that assault-style weapons were banned entirely, he believes that given the current political reality, that such a ban would be unlikely to ever happen, and accordingly, he is advocating for measures to reduce gun violence which have a realistic chance of passage. He told the Tampa Bay Times in March 2018 that he has dedicated the rest of his life to fighting for gun safety.

=== NRA ===
He is a staunch critic of the National Rifle Association of America (NRA) as well as its former spokesperson Dana Loesch, and he criticized the NRA advertisement entitled Time Is Running Out, saying if a terrorist organization released a similar video, the terror threat level would be raised. He told lawmakers that "All our legislators who stand with the NRA, they're standing with a terrorist group." He called on President Donald Trump to address threats made against survivors and their families and demand such behavior stop.

Guttenberg noted that guns were prohibited by the Secret Service at the NRA convention in Dallas when vice president Mike Pence is scheduled to speak, and criticized the decision as hypocritical. Guttenberg said:

According to the NRA, we should want everyone to have weapons when we are in public ... But when they put on a convention, the weapons are a concern? I thought giving everyone a gun was to enhance safety.

— Guttenberg, April 2018

=== Political ===
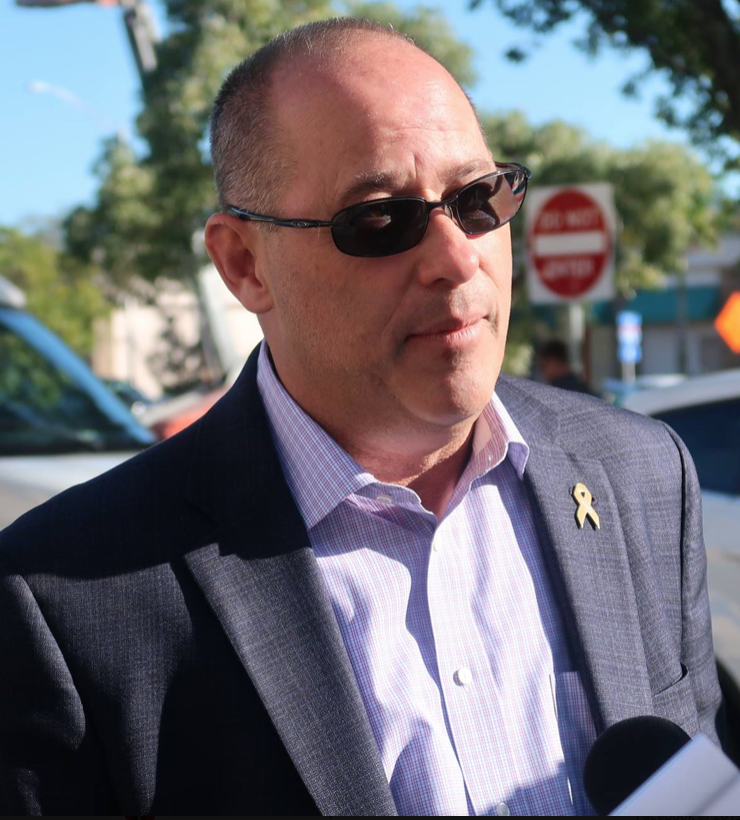
Guttenberg speaks to the press on Sheriff Scott Israel's suspension on January 11, 2019.

In early March 2018 he traveled to Washington, D.C. to speak at a US Senate hearing about taking steps to prevent further violence. While in the Washington area he also spoke at a town hall in Alexandria, Virginia. Guttenberg's advocacy has been characterized by his refusal to sit down, with Democratic Florida Senator Bill Nelson explaining that Guttenberg "cannot talk about this sitting down."

Every time one of these incidents happens, the conversation afterwards is always way too polite, way too comfortable, and way too temporary ... I will always be respectful... I'm not going away. This will not be temporary.

— Fred Guttenberg, March 16, 2018

Javier Manjarres, a Republican primary election candidate for Florida's 22nd congressional district, wrote on social media in July 2018, "C'mon Fred...stop exploiting her death in the name of some political agenda...your daughter was shot by some lunatic who had an AR-15, not by the gun itself. #Fixit #VoteJavi". Guttenberg responded that he would do everything possible to make sure that Manjarres would not "sniff the halls of Congress", and that "If you call honesty around gun safety exploitation, then you clearly have a political agenda." Manjarres was later arrested for physically attacking his sister's boyfriend and shooting at his truck as he fled.

On September 4, 2018, at a confirmation hearing for the Supreme Court nomination of Brett Kavanaugh, Guttenberg, attending as a guest of Senator Dianne Feinstein, introduced himself to Kavanaugh and held out his arm; Kavanaugh looked at him, but turned away without shaking his hand. The encounter formed the basis of one the many written questions Kavanaugh received from the senators following the hearing; in response Kavanaugh wrote that he did not recognize Guttenberg after having had a "chaotic morning". Guttenberg criticized Kavanaugh's response, calling it "less than genuine".

In September 2019, Guttenberg met with Senator Ted Cruz and actress and advocate Alyssa Milano to discuss gun violence. He said this was "a really important day." On February 4, 2020, Guttenberg was invited to attend President Trump's State of the Union address. During the speech, Guttenberg attempted to shout over the President, and was asked to leave. The following day he apologized for the outburst, saying he let his emotions get the best of him.

After the Robb Elementary School shooting in 2022, Guttenberg called for politicians to enact stricter gun control, and expressed support for the families of the victims.

Guttenberg serves on the advisory board of Voters of Tomorrow, an advocacy organization that promotes political engagement among Generation Z.

In 2024, Guttenberg disavowed gun violence advocacy group March for Our Lives, claiming that their support for pro-Palestine college protests in the Gaza war was antisemitic. He had also previously stated that he would support a pro-Israel Republican over an anti-Israel Democrat in an election, and that he was in favor of Governor Ron DeSantis's moves to ban Students for Justice in Palestine chapters from Florida universities.

=== Legal ===
In May 2018, Guttenberg and another parent whose child was killed in the massacre filed lawsuits against American Outdoor Brands, a company that makes the AR-15 rifle, and Sunrise Tactical Supply, a store that sold the weapon to the shooter, as being "complicit in the attack" that resulted in 17 deaths. The lawsuit is the first step in an effort to challenge a 2001 Florida law that protects gun makers and gun sellers from such lawsuits.

== Personal life ==
Guttenberg is a real estate agent and auto broker in Parkland, Florida. Guttenberg grew up in a Conservative Jewish home and is a Reform Jew as an adult. He struggled with his faith after his daughter's death; he ceased attending synagogue but remained on good terms with his rabbi.
