= Voters of Tomorrow =

American advocacy group

- Formation: 2019
- Founder: Santiago Mayer
- Type: Advocacy group
- Location: United States of America
- Website: votersoftomorrow.org

Voters of Tomorrow is an American left-leaning advocacy organization that seeks to promotes political engagement among Generation Z through online and on-campus efforts. The group is reportedly the largest Gen Z-led organization of its kind, with chapters in 25 states.

== History ==
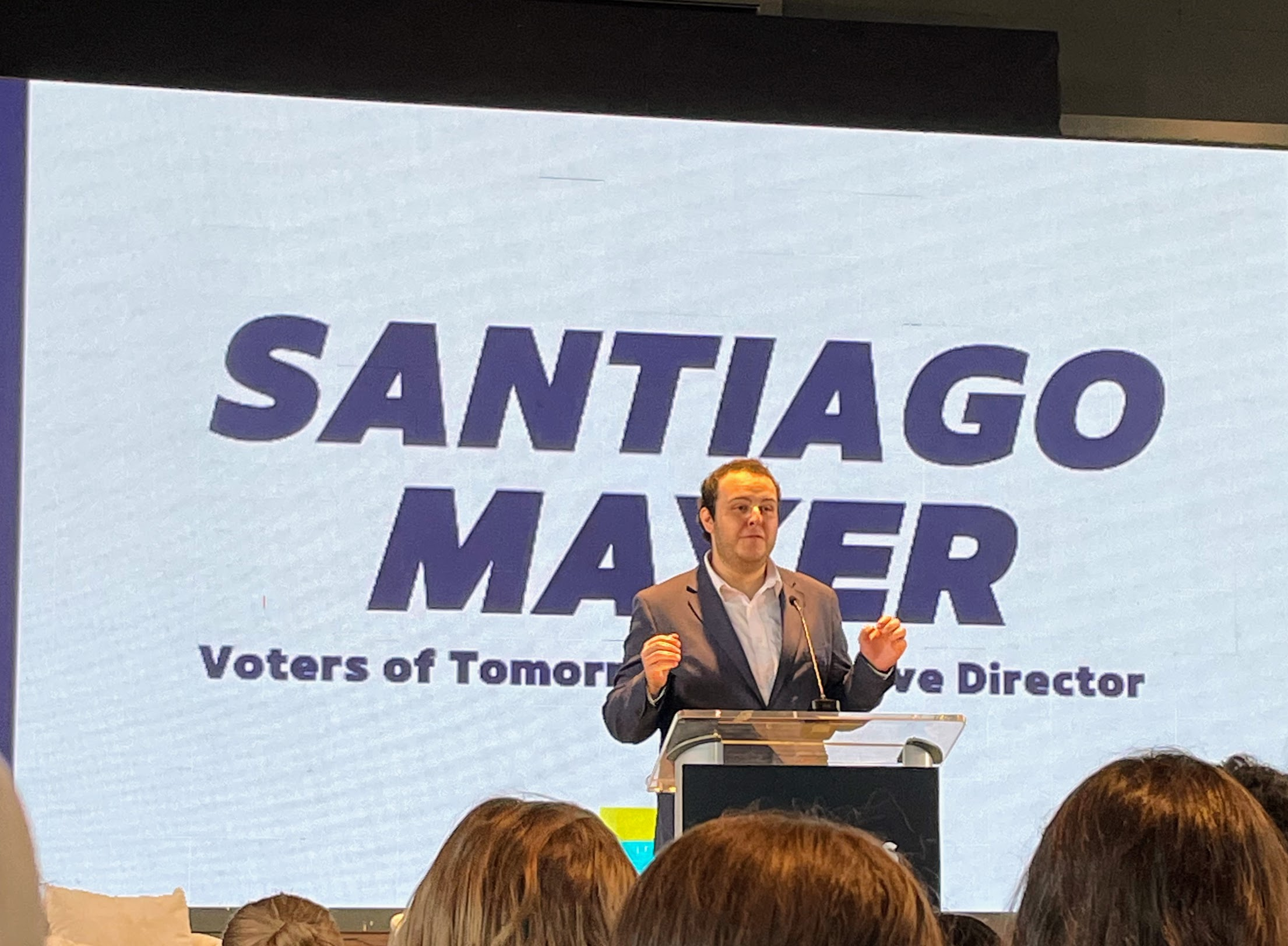
Executive Director Santiago Mayer addresses a crowd at the Voters of Tomorrow Summit 2025.

Voters of Tomorrow was founded in 2019 by Santiago Mayer, a Mexican immigrant. At the time, he was 17 years old and attending high school in California. Mayer cited his anger toward then-President Donald Trump's "Muslim ban" as one of the reasons behind the group's founding.

== Activities ==
=== 2022 election efforts ===
During the 2022 election cycle, Voters of Tomorrow reportedly made more than 8.4 million direct voter contacts, over 2 million during the U.S. Senate runoff in Georgia. The group's efforts to organize young voters in 2022 were noted in Georgia, Michigan, Pennsylvania, Virginia, and California. The group also touted a social media reach of more than 100 million in the weeks ahead of the election. Voters of Tomorrow was "one of several youth voter groups that worked to boost turnout among 18-29-year-olds and may have saved the [2022] election for the Democrats," according to the Financial Times.

In Texas, after officials shut down the on-campus early voting location at Texas A&M University, Voters of Tomorrow and other groups organized two weeks of shuttle buses to transport students to vote at another polling place. During the U.S. Senate runoff in Georgia, the group helped offer complimentary Uber vouchers to young people traveling to their polling place in all of Georgia's 159 counties.

During the 2022 election cycle, Voters of Tomorrow endorsed multiple candidates, including Democratic U.S. House candidate Maxwell Frost and Democratic Pennsylvania gubernatorial candidate Josh Shapiro. Frost, who became the first member of Gen Z elected to Congress, publicly noted that Voters of Tomorrow was among the first national organizations to support his political campaign, helping legitimize his efforts.

=== 2024 election efforts ===
During the 2024 presidential election, Voters of Tomorrow reportedly made more than 26 million direct voter contacts and focused organizing on college campuses in swing states. The group endorsed Kamala Harris in the race.

In addition to its direct organizing, Voters of Tomorrow launched a texting campaign to combat misinformation in Wisconsin and a social media campaign against Jill Stein, the Green Party nominee. Voters of Tomorrow also collected signatures from members of the U.S. House of Representatives on its "Youth Vote Champions Pledge," which encourages candidates to engage with young voters early in the cycle.

During the 2024 Republican Party presidential primaries, Voters of Tomorrow initiated a trolling campaign to dissuade young voters from supporting candidates Donald Trump and Nikki Haley. The group purchased domain names associated with the two politicians that now redirect to websites containing the candidates' views on issues like the environment, gun control, abortion rights and LGBTQ+ rights. Voters of Tomorrow then reportedly placed digital advertisements in an attempt to increase traffic to the website among Instagram and Snapchat users in various battleground states.

=== Lobbying efforts and confrontation with Rep. Marjorie Taylor Greene ===
In 2022, Voters of Tomorrow published its "Gen Z Agenda," a legislative platform based on polling of college students nationwide. The platform contains policies including raising the minimum wage, abolishing the filibuster in Congress, protecting abortion rights, preventing gun violence, and combating climate change. Voters of Tomorrow claims it lobbied The White House and over 100 Congressional offices on its "Gen Z Agenda" in 2022 and boasted about its progress in certain areas.

While attending meetings at the U.S. Capitol in September 2022, members of Voters of Tomorrow confronted U.S. Representative Marjorie Taylor Greene regarding gun control. In a video posted on Greene's Twitter account, Greene appears to kick a member of Voters of Tomorrow. Greene's office disputed Voters of Tomorrow's account of the incident.

=== Voting rights lawsuits ===
In May 2023, Voters of Tomorrow, in conjunction with Florida NAACP, UnidosUS, and other groups, filed a lawsuit in the Northern District of Florida challenging the states' Senate Bill 7050. The plaintiffs petitioned for a preliminary injunction against the law's noncitizen voter registration ban. The case is ongoing. Members of Voters of Tomorrow have advocated against other proposed changes to Florida election law, including those related to restricting mail-in ballot access.

In February 2023, Voters of Tomorrow threatened legal action against Texas officials if the state legislature passed House Bill 2390, legislation that would ban polling places on college campuses.

=== Annual summits ===
Since 2022, Voters of Tomorrow has hosted an annual multi-day summit during the summer. The first summit gathered youth activists, some as young as 13 years old, in Philadelphia in August 2022.

The group hosted its second summit in Washington, D.C. in July 2023, with speakers included former House Speaker Nancy Pelosi; White House Press Secretary Karine Jean-Pierre; U.S. Representatives Maxwell Frost, Summer Lee, Robert Garcia, and Jamaal Bowman; former Senator Doug Jones; and North Carolina Democratic Party Chair Anderson Clayton.

In July 2024, Voters of Tomorrow hosted its third summit in Atlanta, days after Kamala Harris became the presumptive Democratic nominee for president. Harris addressed attendees with video remarks, and her campaign and the Democratic National Committee were partners of the event. U.S. Representative Pramila Jayapal and other elected officials spoke in person.

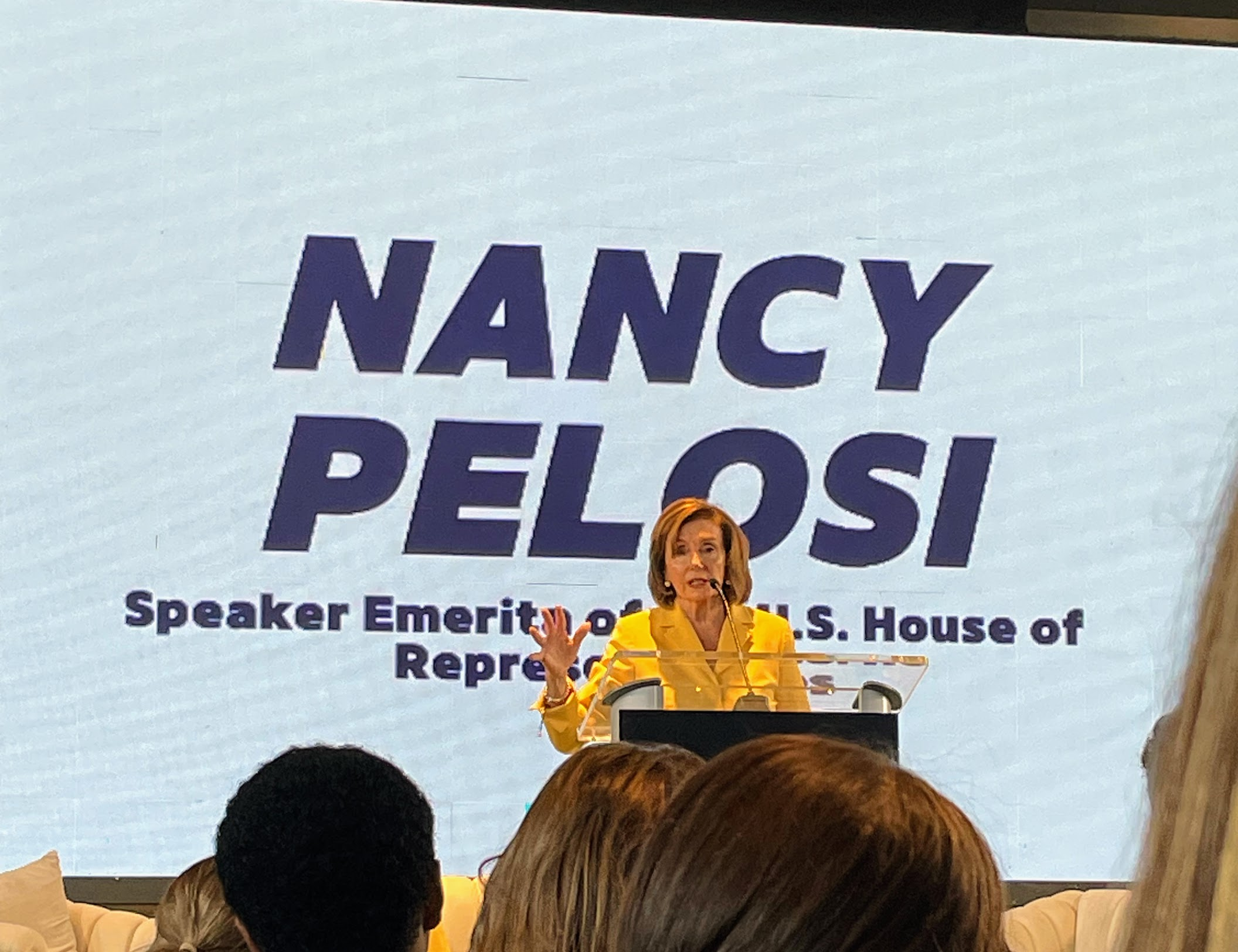
Nancy Pelosi speaks at the 2025 summit in Washington, D.C.

The organization hosted its fourth summit on July 25, 2025, in Washington DC. It featured remarks from former Speaker of the House Nancy Pelosi, Congressman Ro Khanna, Congresswoman Yassamin Ansari, Pennsylvania State Representative and DNC Vice Chair Malcolm Kenyatta, Maryland Delegate Joe Vogel, Leaders We Deserve co-founder David Hogg, congressional candidate Kat Abughazaleh, March for Our Lives Executive Director Jaclyn Corin, comedian Suzanne Lambert, journalist Aaron Parnas, and others. Virtual remarks were given by former Vice President Kamala Harris and Congressman Jamie Raskin.

=== Other advocacy campaigns ===
In response to the Dobbs v. Jackson Women's Health Organization Supreme Court decision, Voters of Tomorrow launched a campaign to distribute contraceptives in order to potentially raise voter awareness. Volunteers at college campuses in multiple states handed out condoms with brochures about reproductive health and information on how to vote.

In response to a rise in book bans across the U.S., in 2022, Voters of Tomorrow distributed hundreds of copies of books challenged or banned in local school districts. The books included Beloved by Toni Morrison and Maus by Art Spiegelman. During the book distributions, the group also encouraged high school students to register to vote.

On November 17, 2022, during the Taylor Swift–Ticketmaster controversy, Voters of Tomorrow launched an antitrust campaign titled "S.W.I.F.T." (Swifties Working to Increase Fairness from Ticketmaster). The group intended to mobilize Gen Z to advocate for enhanced federal oversight that would prevent future entertainment monopolies, according to news organizations.

== Organizational structure ==
Voters of Tomorrow has chapters in 25 states and volunteers in all 50 states.

The organization's board of directors includes Randi Weingarten and Olivia Troye, among others. The group also has an advisory board that includes Fred Guttenberg, Eliza Orlins, Yohuru Williams, Joely Fisher, and others.

== See also ==
- HeadCount
- Mi Familia Vota
- Vote Save America
- VoteRiders
- Youth suffrage
