= Sonia Purnell =

British writer and journalist

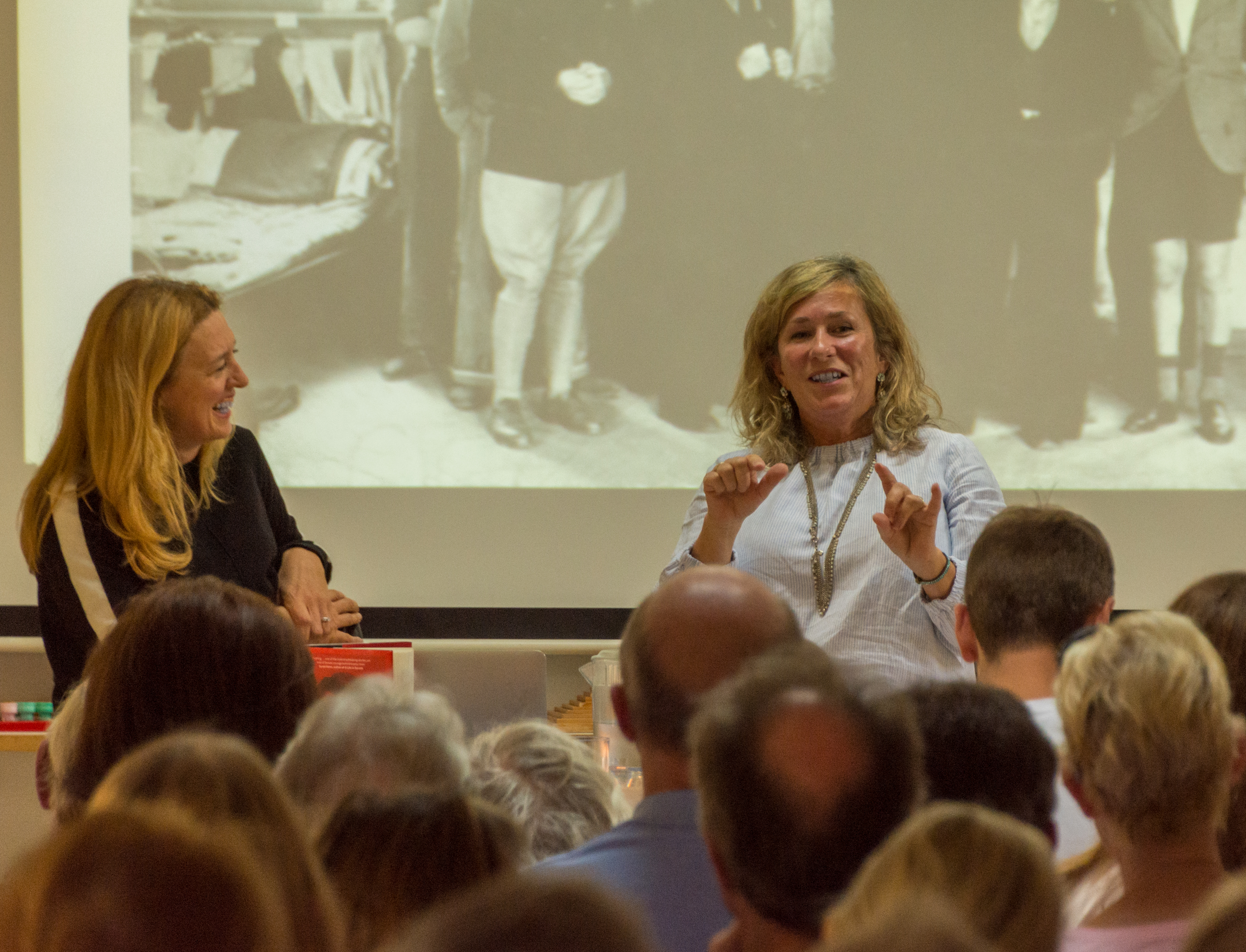
Purnell in 2019 at the Chiswick Book Festival

Sonia Purnell is a British writer and journalist who has worked at The Economist, The Daily Telegraph, and The Sunday Times. Her books include Clementine: The Life of Mrs. Winston Churchill, which was chosen as book of the year by The Telegraph and The Independent, and was a finalist for the Plutarch Award. She also wrote The Kingmaker, a biography of Pamela Harriman.

She also wrote the book and screenplay for the future film about Virginia Hall – A Woman of No Importance, produced by J. J. Abrams. It was chosen as a "Best Book of the Year" by NPR.

== Bibliography ==
Year	Title	Ref.
2012	Just Boris: A Tale of Blond Ambition - A Biography of Boris Johnson	
2015	Clementine: The Life of Mrs. Winston Churchill	
2019	A Woman of No Importance: The Untold Story of Virginia Hall, WWII’s Most Dangerous Spy	
2024	Kingmaker: Pamela Harriman's Astonishing Life of Power, Seduction, and Intrigue	
