= The Dead Are Arising =

2020 biography of Malcolm X by Les Payne and Tamara Payne

- Cover of the first, US edition
- Author: Les Payne and Tamara Payne
- Audio read by: Dion Graham
- Language: English
- Subject: Malcolm X
- Publisher: Liveright
- Publication date: September 29, 2020
- Publication place: United States
- Pages: 612
- Awards: National Book Award for Nonfiction (2020); Pulitzer Prize for Biography (2021)
- ISBN: 978-1-63149-166-5 Hardcover
- OCLC: 1137810018
- Dewey Decimal: 320.546092
- LC Class: BP223.Z8
- Website: wwnorton.com/books/9781631491665

The Dead Are Arising: The Life of Malcolm X is a biography of Malcolm X by Les Payne and Tamara Payne. The book was published on September 29, 2020 by Liveright in hardcover format while an audiobook, narrated by actor Dion Graham, was simultaneously released by Recorded Books. Among other honors, the book won the 2020 National Book Award for Nonfiction and the 2021 Pulitzer Prize for Biography.

External audio
- Audiobook excerpt

== Publication ==
Les Payne spent almost 30 years on the book. He and his daughter, Tamara Payne, researched the book together. She completed the book after his 2018 death.

== Reception ==
Among others, the book was reviewed by Kerri Greenidge, Yohuru Williams, Colin Grant, Kehinde Andrews, Mark Whitaker, Alex Preston, and Trevor Phillips. In her review, Kerri Greenidge wrote that the book is "a meticulously researched, compassionately rendered, and fiercely analytical examination of the radical revolutionary as a human being".

Among literary publications, Publishers Weekly posted a starred review of the book stating that it is "richly detailed" and "an extraordinary and essential portrait of the man behind the icon". The New York Times Book Review wrote that "[n]obody has written a more poetic account". Kirkus Reviews wrote, in a starred review, that the book is a "superb biography and an essential addition to the library of African American political engagement". Library Journal posted another starred review that opened by stating that the "book is a monument to investigative reporting" and, in a "verdict" section, it was given their "highest recommendation" with a byline that says in part: "This gripping read, essential for anyone interested in the man or his times, delivers penetrating explanations and fresh insights into previously unexamined dimensions of Malcolm X and his becoming and being El-hajj Malik El Shabazz within the context of Black life." A review by Booklist called the book "monumental".

== Awards and honors ==
- The book won the 2020 National Book Award for Nonfiction.
- It made the Longlist for the 2021 Andrew Carnegie Medal for Excellence in Nonfiction.
- It is the 2021 Pulitzer Prize Winner in Biography.

=== Best books lists ===
Among other honors, the book has been included in several year end book lists. The New York Times Book Review included the book in its list of "100 Notable Books of 2020" with a byline that called the book "magisterial". The book was also named as number five on the Time list "The 10 Best Nonfiction Books of 2020" with a byline that stated, in part, that the authors had "written the essential book for understanding the force that was Malcolm, with deep insights into his childhood, his path to the Nation of Islam and his assassination."

- It was named as one of the "100 Notable Books of 2020" by The New York Times Book Review.
- The book was named as number five on the Time list "The 10 Best Nonfiction Books of 2020".
- It was named as one of "The Ten Best History Books of 2020" by Smithsonian Magazine.
- It was included on a list of "Best Biographies and Memoirs of 2020" by Library Journal.

== Release details ==
=== Print ===
- Payne, Les (October 20, 2020). The Dead Are Arising: The Life of Malcolm X. Payne, Tamara (1st ed.). New York: Liveright. ISBN 978-1-63149-166-5. OCLC 1137810018. (hardcover)
- Payne, Les (September 29, 2020). The Dead Are Arising: The Life of Malcolm X. Payne, Tamara (1st ed.). New York: Liveright. ISBN 978-1-4328-8615-8. OCLC 1137810018. (library binding)

=== Audiobook ===
- Payne, Les (October 20, 2020), The Dead Are Arising: The Life of Malcolm X, Payne, Tamara; Graham, Dion, Maryland: Recorded Books, ISBN 978-1-7050-0834-8, OCLC 1202534145 (eAudio)
- Payne, Les (October 20, 2020), The Dead Are Arising: The Life of Malcolm X, Payne, Tamara; Graham, Dion, Maryland: Recorded Books, ISBN 978-1-7050-1272-7, OCLC 1201463897 (MP3 CD)
- Payne, Les (October 20, 2020), The Dead Are Arising: The Life of Malcolm X, Payne, Tamara; Graham, Dion, Maryland: Recorded Books, ISBN 978-1-7050-0812-6, OCLC 1201290005 (CD - unabridged)

== See also ==
- Bibliography of Malcolm X
- Bibliography of Martin Luther King Jr.
