= Revolution 1989: The Fall of the Soviet Empire =

- Author: Victor Sebestyen
- Cover artist: Abby Weintraub
- Language: English
- Genre: Nonfiction
- Publisher: Vintage Books
- Publication date: November 2, 2010
- Publication place: United States
- Pages: 451
- ISBN: 978-0-307-38792-9

Revolution 1989: The Fall of the Soviet Empire is a 2012 non-fiction book by written by historian Victor Sebestyen. The full text is divided into three parts with 48 chapters in total. The author recounts the dissolution of the Soviet Union and the resulting consequences on its various satellite states.

== Overview ==
Part One: Cold War has 10 chapters. It deals with how the Soviet Union administered their satellite states over the course of the Cold War. It starts at the construction of the Berlin Wall in 1961 and ends at martial law in Poland during the government crackdown on the Fighting Solidarity movement in 1983.

Part Two: The Thaw has 15 chapters. It deals with the cool-down in relations between the Soviet Union and the United States. It starts at the appointment of Mikhail Gorbachev as General Secretary of the Communist Party of the Soviet Union in 1985 and ends with the arrival of Gorbachev in Times Square in 1988.

Part Three: Revolution has 23 chapters. It deals with the various revolutions that occurred in Soviet satellite states in 1989.

== Reception ==
The Daily Telegraph, The Times, and The Guardian published positive reviews.
