= Yepoka Yeebo =

Yepoka Yeebo is a London-based writer, journalist, and photographer. Her non-fiction book Anansi's Gold: The man who swindled the world (Bloomsbury, 2023), won the Jhalak Prize in 2024.

Yeebo was raised in London, and was working as a journalist and living in Ghana and the UK when she wrote Anansi's Gold over a period of six years. The book is a biography of Ghanaian financial criminal John Ackah Blay-Miezah. Alongside winning the Jhalak Prize, the book was awarded the 2024 Plutarch Award by the Biographers International Organization. It was additionally shortlisted for the Mark Lynton History Prize and The New York Times Book Review named Anansi's Gold as a Notable Book of 2023.

In 2015, Yeebo's photographs of Agbogbloshie in Accra, Ghana highlighted the adverse ecological and social effects of the dumping of international electronic waste in the region.

Yeebo lives in West London with academic Edmund Richardson. An interview with Yeebo features on the Pulitzer Centre's resources for schools in their "meet the journalist" series.
