= The Invention of Charlotte Brontë =

2025 book by Graham Watson

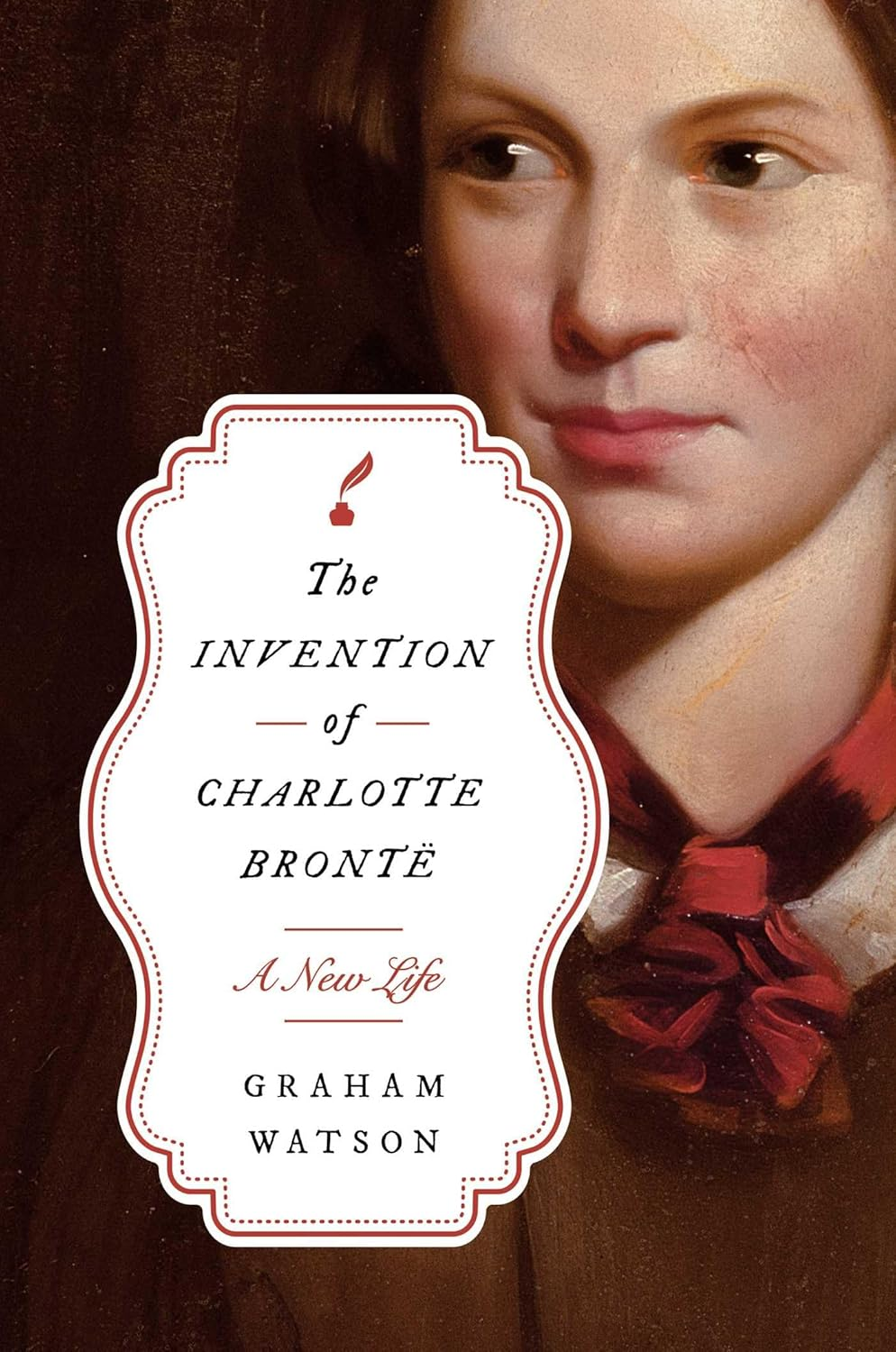
- Author: Graham Watson
- Language: English
- Published: 2025
- Publisher: Pegasus Books
- Publication place: United States
- Pages: 286

The Invention of Charlotte Brontë is a biography of Charlotte Brontë written by Graham Watson. It was first published in the US in 2025, and the UK in 2024. It was selected as one of the best books of 2025 by The Washington Post and The Wall Street Journal and has been longlisted for the Kirkus Prize and Plutarch Award. It is Watson's first book.

== Overview ==
The book is narrative non-fiction, examining the last five years in the life of Charlotte Brontë and the creation of her cultural afterlife through a controversial biography commissioned shortly after her death. It is divided into three parts. The first reflects Brontë's contact with individuals who will act as primary biographical sources of her life after her death. The second part recounts Elizabeth Gaskell's research and writing of the first biography of Brontë, then the controversies that required it to be withdrawn and rewritten shortly after its release to placate complaints of slander. The third, concluding, part illustrates how Gaskell's biography made Brontë into a culturally significant figure.

Crucially, Watson's central argument challenges previous examinations of the subject which have presented Gaskell as an unreliable journalist misled by her sources into using incorrect material. Watson asserts that documentary evidence demonstrates this is untrue and was a smear by Gaskell's publisher calculated to defuse libel suits made against them. Consequently, Watson concludes, this has distorted all subsequent receptions of both Gaskell's and Brontë's lives.

== Publication history ==
The book was published in the United States by Pegasus Books on August 5, 2025. It was first published in the United Kingdom by The History Press on June 6, 2024.

== Reception ==
Kirkus Reviews, Publishers Weekly and Booklist all published starred reviews. Kirkus praised the depth and scope of Watson's research, calling it "a brilliant reappraisal of a much-chronicled life." Publishers Weekly heralded it as "a vivid debut", praising Watson's objectivity and willingness to examine Brontë's deliberate participation in her own mythologizing. The Washington Post echoed this, terming Watson's approach as delivering "a clear eyed portrait". Booklist praised what it termed Watson's "choral" use of primary sources, forming a "recalibration" of both Brontë and Gaskell, describing his writing style as having "the gravitas of scholarship and the magnetism of fiction". Library Journal described the book as "well-researched and beautifully paced", emphasising that Watson's approach will "humanise the woman, the writer, and her works." BookBrowse gave it a five star review, celebrating Watson's "original" position and his "unobtrusive" mediation of the voices of his female subjects, concluding that the book "peels away more than a century of Brontë myth". The New York Review of Books praised the book as an "immersive, intelligent and impassioned account" that presents a "more complex" portrait of Brontë, while expressing reservation about Watson's critiques of the men in her life. RealClear Books & Culture thought it "a literary biography with a sensibility that enlivens and remembers why its subject is worthy of discussion", praising Watson's thorough and corrective research, which its reviewer considered "has now vindicated" Gaskell's often maligned role in the creation of Brontë's celebrity. Both The Wall Street Journal and The Christian Science Monitor considered the book an examination of the nature and consequences of biography, the former describing it as "a biography of a biography and a gripping testimony into the enduring problems that all biographers face in pursuit of their art", the latter noting that "Watson critiques biography itself while exploring the fraught life, creative output, and frenzied eulogizing of Charlotte Brontë".

== Awards ==
The book has been longlisted for the 2025 Kirkus Prize and Plutarch Award.
