= Edmund Richardson (academic) =

British classics academic

- Occupation: Academic
- Awards: Baillie Gifford Prize

Academic background
- Education: University of Cambridge (PhD)

Academic work
- Discipline: Classics and Ancient History
- Institutions: Durham University
- Notable works: Alexander: God, King, Man

Edmund Richardson is a professor in the department of Classics and Ancient History at Durham University. He has written several historical books, including Alexander: God, King, Man and Alexandria: The Quest for the Lost City. He was the editor of Classics in Extremis: The Edges of Classical Reception, a collection of essays.

== Academic career ==
Richardson grew up in Bristol and attended Bristol Grammar School. Richardson defended his PhD at the University of Cambridge in 2008. He was a Hannah Seeger Davis postdoctoral fellow in Hellenic studies at the University of Princeton, for 2009–2010. He then became the Leverhulme early career fellow at Durham for 2010–2012, before moving to the University of Leeds to become a lecturer for 2012–13. In 2013 Richardson took up an associate professorship at Durham, where he was later promoted to professor.

== Reviews and Awards ==
In 2021, Richardson released his book Alexandria: The Quest for the Lost City, a biography of the 19th-century explorer Charles Masson who is associated with the modern discovery of Alexandria in the Caucasus. William Dalrymple, reviewer for The Guardian, provided an endorsement of the book: "The result, evocatively written, impeccably researched and minutely footnoted, but with the pace and deftly woven plot complexity of a John le Carré novel, is a small masterpiece." The Daily Telegraph reviewer Harry Sidebottom also liked the book, describing it "a brilliant and evocative biography, written with consummate scholarship, great style and wit." The US version of the book has the title of The King's Shadow: Obsession, Betrayal, and the Deadly Quest for the Lost City of Alexandria. The New York Times reviewer, Joshua Hammer, referring to Masson, said: "Richardson's colorful and compelling account gives this forgotten figure his due."

Richardson's 2026 account of the life of Alexander the Great, Alexander: God, King, Man, was given a positive review by The Economist in June 2026: "This book, which combines analysis with good old-fashioned fun, offers a lesson in how history can be both academically ambitious and readable." Patrick Kidd, reviewing the book in The Times, described it as absorbing and thorough, with "some delightful nuggets". James Romm in the Times Literary Supplement was more critical, particularly in respect of some of the book's sourcing: "Richardson seems to have gone beyond the historical record in an effort to give Alexander extra sex appeal. Regrettably, he has done much the same with his narrative as a whole." Alexander: God, King, Man won the 2026 Baillie Gifford Prize. It was the first ancient history title to win this prize, and was described by the judges as a "cracking cinematic story about the ancient world involving a masterful assembly of research materials alongside exceptional literary craft".

== Personal life ==
Richardson lives in London with his partner, journalist Yepoka Yeebo. He was diagnosed with cancer in 2023.

== Bibliography ==
- Classical Victorians: Scholars, Scoundrels and Generals in Pursuit of Antiquity. Cambridge: Cambridge University Press. 7 February 2013. ISBN 978-1-107-02677-3. OCLC 826333821.
- Richardson, Edmund, ed. (1 November 2018). Classics in extremis : the edges of Classical Reception. London: Bloomsbury Academic. doi:10.5040/9781350017283. ISBN 978-1-350-01725-2. OCLC 1039200864.
- Alexandria : the Quest for the Lost City. London: Bloomsbury Publishing. 13 May 2021. ISBN 978-1-5266-0381-4. OCLC 1242598941.
- Alexandria : The King's Shadow: Obsession, Betrayal, and the Deadly Quest for the Lost City of Alexandria. New York: St. Martin's Press. 2022. ISBN 978-1-250-27859-3. OCLC 1246140878. US edition has a different title to the UK release.
- Alexander: God, King, Man. London: Bloomsbury Publishing. 4 June 2026. ISBN 978-1-5266-5814-2. OCLC 1601367418.
