= Jane Rogoyska =

British writer and filmmaker

- Education: Cambridge University
- Occupations: writer, filmmaker
- Writing career
- Language: English
- Notable work: Gerda Taro: Inventing Robert Capa
- Notable awards: Mark Lynton History Prize (2022)
- Website: janerogoyska.com

Jane Rogoyska is British writer of Polish origin, best known for her books Surviving Katyn (2022 Mark Lynton History Prize winner), Gerda Taro: Inventing Robert Capa, Kozlowski (2020 Desmond Elliott Prize longlist), and Hotel Exile (2026 Women's Prize for Non-Fiction shortlist).

== Background ==
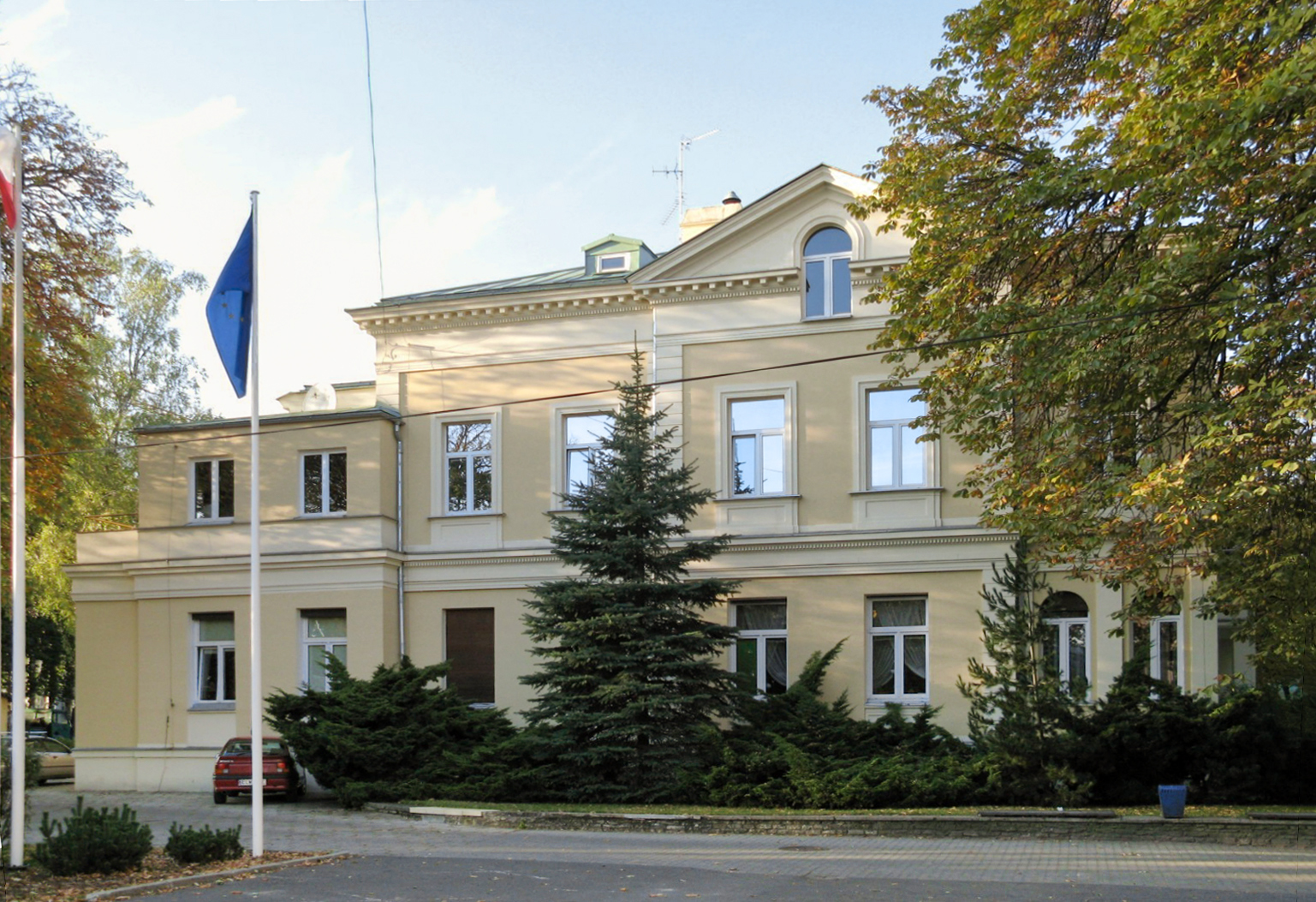
Rogoyska studied at the Łódź Film School (here, circa 2010)

Jane Rogoyska's grandfather served in Intelligence in Poland during the 1910s–1920s and as deputy director of the Bank of Poland at the beginning of World War II, fled with his family on a government train that helped take gold secretly out of the country. Her father was educated in the UK; her mother was British. Rogoyska grew up in London and learned Polish as an adult. She studied Modern & Medieval Languages (French & Italian) at Christ’s College, Cambridge University and went on to complete an MA in Film production at the Northern Film School (Leeds) and Polish National Film School (Łodź).

== Career ==
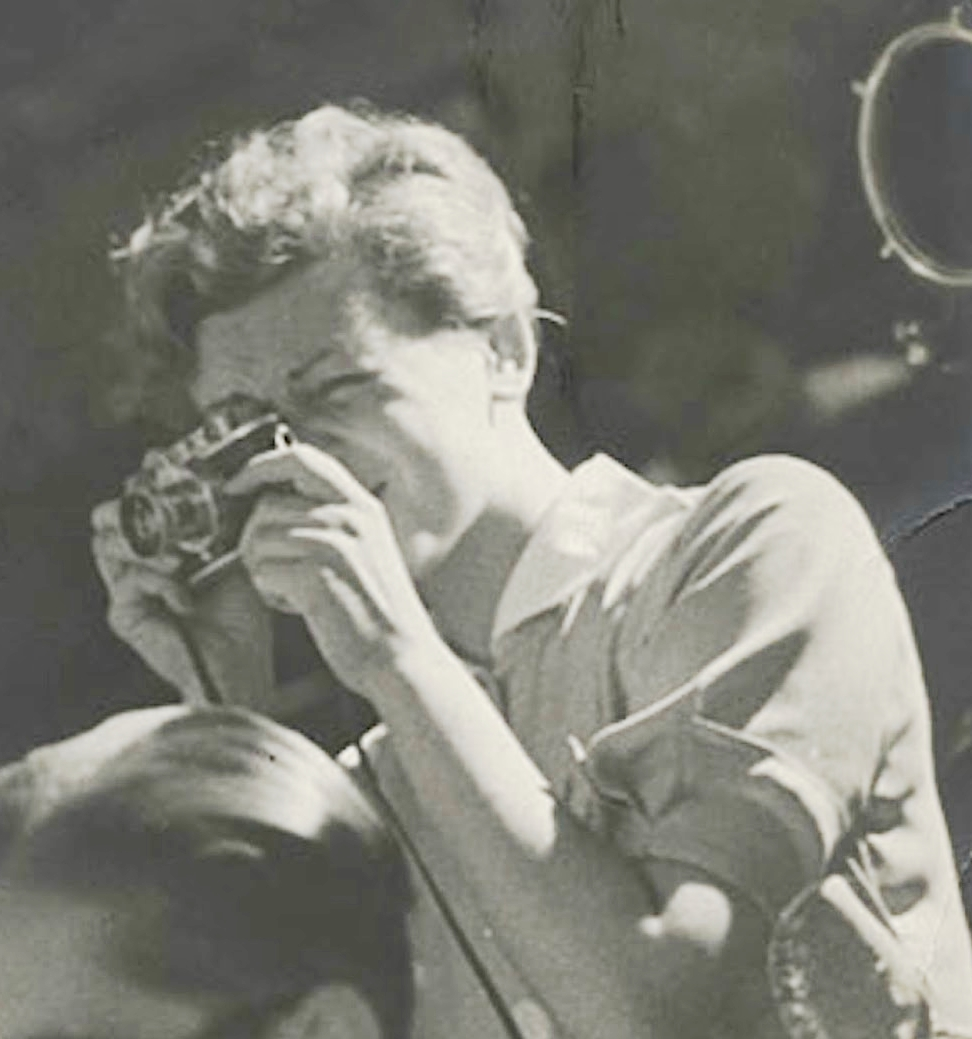
Rogoyska wrote a book about Gerda Taro (here, on the Guadalajara front, circa July 1937)

Rogoyska worked extensively as a filmmaker until 2011, when she shifted direction to focus on her own research and writing. She writes mainly about 20th-century European history, with a particular interest in the turbulent period from the 1930s to the Cold War. Her first book, Gerda Taro: Inventing Robert Capa (Jonathan Cape, 2013), was the first English-language biography of the German photojournalist who died, aged 26, while reporting on the Battle of Brunete during the Spanish Civil War in 1937. Her 2021 book Surviving Katyn is a comprehensive study of the history of the 1940 Katyn Massacre examined from the perspective of both victims and survivors. The book was awarded the Columbia School of Journalism's prestigious Mark Lynton History Prize 2022, was longlisted for the RSL Ondaatje Prize 2022 and won Honourable Mentions in the Witold Pilecki International Book Award 2022 and the Polish Government’s History Competition for Best Foreign Language Publication about Poland’s History 2022. Rogoyska’s research into the Katyń Massacre also led to her first novel, Kozłowski (longlisted for the Desmond Elliott Prize 2020), and Still Here: A Polish Odyssey, which she wrote and presented for BBC Radio 4 in 2018. During her research on Katyń, Rogoyska discovered that her own great-uncle, Ludwik Rynkowski, was one of the victims of the massacre.

Rogoyska has worked frequently with the UK’s leading charity for writers, the Royal Literary Fund, developing educational and promotional content for them and serving as a Royal Literary Fund Writing Fellow at the University of Greenwich (2013–14), the Royal College of Music (2015–2016), The School of Advanced Studies at the University of London (2016–2017) and The Courtauld Institute of Art (2023–2024). She is a tutor of Narrative Non-Fiction on the Creative Writing Course at the Institute of Continuing Education, University of Cambridge.

== Works ==
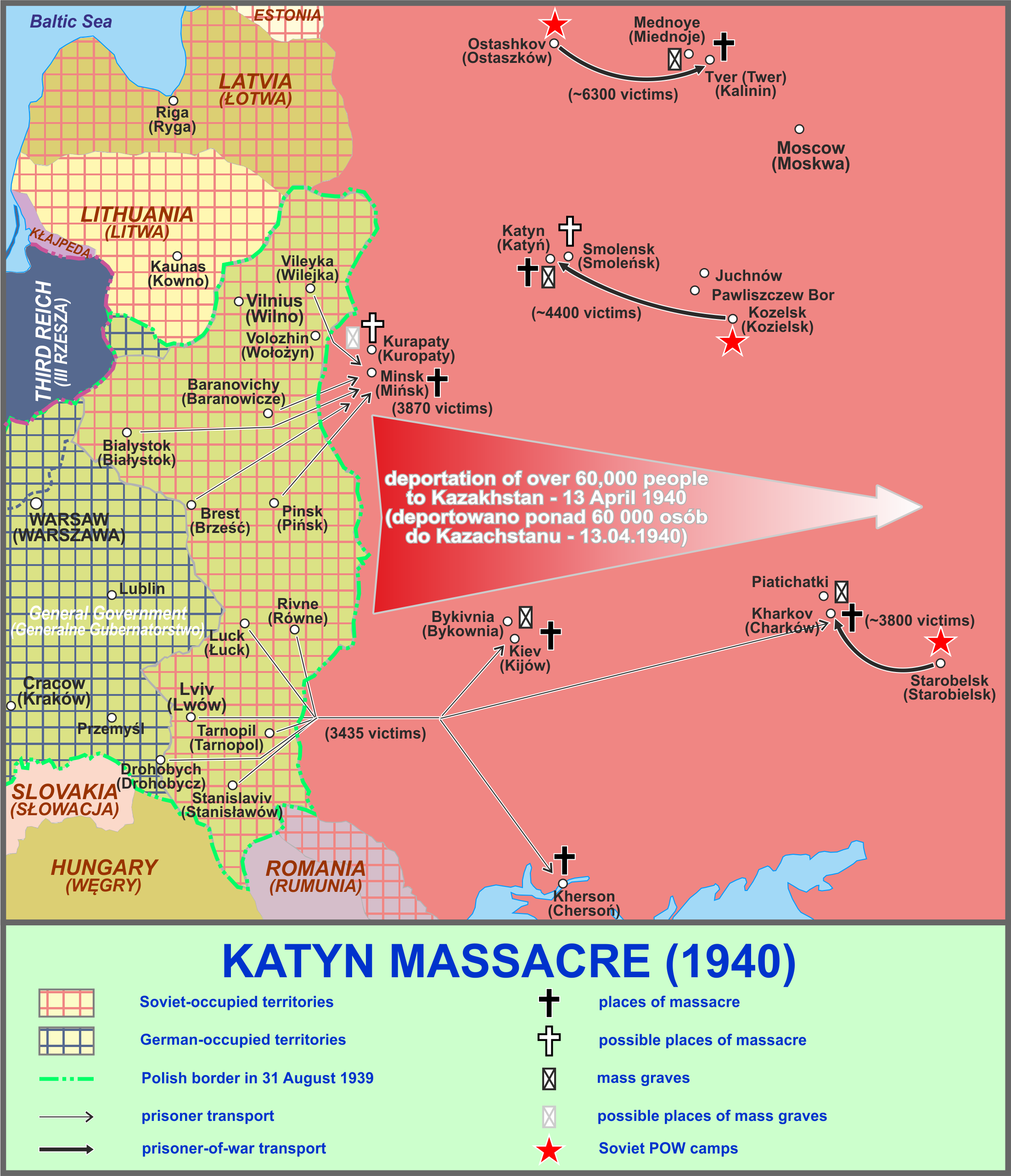
Rogoyska has written about her ancestral Poland, most recently about the 1940 Katyn Massacre (here, map of massacre sites)

Books

- Hotel Exile: Paris in the Shadow of War (2026)
- Surviving Katyn: Stalin's Polish Massacre and the Search for Truth (2021)
- Polska Britannica by Czesław Siegieda (introduction) (2020)
- Kozlowski (2019)
- Gerda Taro: Inventing Robert Capa (2013)

Radio & Theatre

- Still Here: A Polish Odyssey (2018)
- Shooting with Light (2015-2016)

Short Films (writer/director)

- Not Waving - Arcane Pictures (2001)
- Funeral of the Last Gypsy King - Arcane Pictures/London Production Fund (1999)
- Waiting for the Light - Tin Fish Films (1998)
- A Quiet Laugh - PWSFT/NSFTV/STO Films (1996)
- I Don’t - NSFTV/FUJI Scholarship (1995)

== Awards ==
Book Awards

- 2026:
  - 2026 American Library in Paris Book Award
  - Shortlist, Women's Prize for Non-Fiction for Hotel Exile
    - Longlist, Women's Prize for Non-Fiction for Hotel Exile
- 2022 for Surviving Katyn:
  - Columbia School of Journalism Mark Lynton History Prize
  - Longlist, RSL Ondaatje Prize
  - Honourable Mention, Witold Pilecki International Book Award
  - Honourable Mention, Polish Government’s History Competition for Best Foreign Language Publication about Poland’s History
- 2020: Longlist, Desmond Elliott Prize of the National Centre for Writing

Short Film Awards

- 1999: for Funeral of the Last Gypsy King:
  - Best Short Film (San Diego International Film Festival)
  - Special Jury Prize (Huesca International Film Festival)
  - Audience Award (International Short Film Festival of Siena
- 1996: for A Quiet Laugh: Special Jury Prize (Balticum Festival)
- 1995: for I Don’t:
  - BAFTA nomination
  - MGM prize (Fuji Scholarship Competition)

== See also ==
- Katyn Massacre
- Gerda Taro
