= Reagan: His Life and Legend =

2024 book by Max Boot

- Author: Max Boot
- Language: English
- Published: 2024
- Publisher: Liveright
- Publication place: United States
- Pages: 880

Reagan: His Life and Legend is a 2024 book by Max Boot about Ronald Reagan's access to power, his pragmatism as a leader, and his eventual influence in the Republican Party's rightward turn.

Reagan is nominated for the 2025 Plutarch Award.
