= John Ackah Blay-Miezah =

Ghanaian conman (1941–1992)

John Ackah Blay-Miezah (born John Kolorah Blay, 1941–1992) was a Ghanaian con artist. He was a pioneer of advance-fee fraud. He claimed to be worth $47 billion. From the 1960s to 1980s, he is said to have swindled over $200m from victims in North America, Europe, and Asia. He was named "the Ultimate Con Man" by 60 Minutes.

He claimed to be the sole beneficiary of the "Oman Ghana Trust Fund" and that in order to access the funds, he needed money. He claimed that the trust was endowed by Kwame Nkrumah. He promised to pay $10 for every $1 he received. His supporters included Ako Adjei, John N. Mitchell and Mr.Sam with several of Nkrumah's cabinet ministers.

== Biography ==
John Kolorah Blay was born into a Nzema family in Ghana's Western Region in 1941. In 1959, he migrated to the United States, settling in Philadelphia, claiming he was following in the footsteps of Kwame Nkrumah in studying at the University of Pennsylvania, while in actuality working as a waiter at the Union League Club. Later he would successfully appropriate the identity of a former roommate—claiming a change of name—and for a time be recognized as having received a bachelor's degree from the Wharton School and a master's degree in international relations. Shortly after returning to Ghana in 1963, he was arrested and sent to Nsawam Prison for making vague claims about a threat to President Nkrumah's life. In 1966, after Nkrumah was overthrown in a coup d'état, he was freed.

By the early 1970s, he was variously claiming to be a President of the African Development Bank or a medical doctor, and the son of noted jurist, Robert Samuel Blay. By 1972 he had returned to Philadelphia, claiming to be a diplomat and set himself up at The Bellevue-Stratford Hotel in Philadelphia. After the Ghanaian mission refused to pay the nearly a $2,644 bill he'd accumulated, he was sentenced to prison for posing as a diplomat and stiffing a hotel. It was probably during that stay in prison that he acquired many of the skills that later allowed him to create his great fraud scheme. In 1974, faced charges for using a fraudulently obtained university degree and trying to cash $250,000 in stolen bank drafts. He fled to Ghana ahead of an arrest warrant. In Ghana, he was sentenced to seven years for fraud and bribery. He was later released under shady circumstances.

In 1974, he claimed that he had inherited 160 million dollars from Daniel Wilbold Layman and announced at a press conference that he planned to invest 6 million dollars in various projects in the Nzema area. In 1975, he was arrested at Accra International Airport in Accra as he was about to board a Ghana Airways VC10 airliner for London. He was arrested for being in possession of 7,700 US dollars and £940 sterling which he allegedly failed to declare. Blay-Miezah also managed to convince Acheampong's government of 47 billion in Swiss Banks. He was also given a Diplomatic Passport by Acheampong's government and shortly after relocated to Europe.

In 1979, his party, People's Vanguard, was issued a provisional certificate of registration by the Office of the Electoral Commissioner. His party didn't gain any credibility and the initials of his party were popularly said to mean Pay Voucher.

After PNDC took over, he managed to convince government of the scheme and his Diplomatic Passport was renewed. He went to Cayman Islands with Kojo Tsikata and Kwesi Botchwey. They returned empty-handed and embarrassed.

In 1986, he was jailed in Ghana on a charge of economic sabotage. He allegedly worked with Robert Ellis to run the fraud since 1972.

In January 1989, 60 Minutes ran a piece on him saying that despite accumulating close to $1 billion using his story, he had not paid a dime. He died before authorities had an opportunity to get back any of the money he'd stolen.

He was put under house arrest for deceiving the PNDC government in Accra and died on 30 June 1992. Even in his death he sowed confusion among his family by claiming that he had some $15 billion in an offshore bank.

In May 1997, High Court declared that the will of Blay-Miezah presented by Dr John R. Kells, a confidant, was valid. This decision was appealed but the Appeal Court in November, 1999, upheld the decision by a two-one majority. In 2001, Supreme Court revoked the probates granted by an Accra High Court. The appeal was filed by Dr Ebenezer Ako-Adjei, and Mr F. K. Mensah, nephew of the Blay Miezah.

== Bibliography ==
- Yeebo, Yepoka (2023). Anansi's Gold: The Man Who Looted the West, Outfoxed Washington, and Swindled the World. London: Bloomsbury. ISBN 978-1-63557-475-3.
