= Pogrom: Kishinev and the Tilt of History =

2018 non-fiction book by Steven J. Zipperstein

- Author: Steven J. Zipperstein
- Language: English
- Genre: History
- Publisher: Liveright
- Publication date: March 27, 2018
- Media type: Print (hardback)
- Pages: 288
- ISBN: 978-1631492693

Pogrom: Kishinev and the Tilt of History is a 2018 non-fiction book by Steven J. Zipperstein on the events leading to the Kishinev Pogrom, the atrocities of the event itself, and its legacy.

== Synopsis ==
The book begins with Zipperstein detailing the events leading to the Pogrom. In 1903, many Christians were struggling as farmers and other lower class jobs whereas many Jews were finding much more success, living in large homes that formerly belonged to Christians. Religious differences also led to many Christians viewing the Jews as different or even lesser peoples. As tensions rose, synagogues warned their members to leave before a greater conflict arose. Many chose to remain and in April, the violence and harassment intensified. Tensions peaked when Kishinev's daily newspaper wrote an article accusing Jews of killing a Christian boy for his blood. The article enraged many Christians and antisemites used it to justify violence against Jews as self-defense, which Zipperstein states caused them to view the Pogrom as a way to defend Christians from the domination of Jews, rather than an attack. He further states that the event was also fueled by social and economic reasons.

On April 19 and 20, 1903, the three-day Kishinev Pogrom massacre began in Kishinev, Russia (today Chișinău, Republic of Moldova). Mobs of laborers and artisans attacked the 50,000 Jews that lived in the city, feathering them, ravaging homes, raping, and killing. The attackers destroyed homes and synagogues, ravaging Jews. Pogromists broke into stores, raped women, and used pitchforks, guns, and other weapons to viciously attack men, women, and children. Zipperstein noted that many of the crimes done were by neighbors and former friends who had known the Jews for many years. Very few civilians and policemen helped protect the Jews. According to Zipperstein, most officials supported the Pogrom, confiscating weapons from Jews and helping the attackers. Zipperstein writes that when a Jew asked an officer for help, the officer did not budge, saying that this was what the Jews deserved. The mob continued their rampage all around the city, shouting slogans such as "Death to the Jews." The result was 49 killed, 95 seriously wounded, 400 more wounded, and 1500 homes destroyed.

=== Zipperstein's analysis ===
After compiling papers, guidebooks, newspapers, and transcripts, Zipperstein saw that there was controversial and contradictory information about the event. One misunderstanding is that the Jewish people were cowardly and ran away from the attack, which Zipperstein states is not true and that they stood up for themselves, guarding areas for protection and finding defense weapons such as bats and metal objects. A poem criticizing the Jewish people was written by Russian Jewish and Zionist poet Hayim Nahman Bialik, which Zipperstein states is contradicted by evidence that a group of over 250 Jewish men rounded up to fight back.

Another conclusion that Zipperstein investigated centered around accusations of the Tsar supporting Pogroms and that they were organized by authoritative figures. He supports this claim, citing things such as a letter written by Nicholas II to his mother as evidence, as the tsar regarded the Pogromists as "loyal people," rather than criticizing them. He also cites the slow support for victims, stating that Russia had anti-semitic support, pointing to how Russian officials and police were not ordered to help the Jews and the little support that was sent was only to protect the tsar's reputation.

Zipperstein also discusses the significance of the Kishinev Pogrom and illustrates how it is a symbol of the Jewish plight in 20th century Europe. The Pogrom became a representation of the discrimination Jews were facing, as they were not only ruthlessly and mercilessly attacked with little to no help, but were also shamed in poem and writing after the event. Zipperstein argues that as a result of the Pogroms such as this in Russia and other countries, many Jews were forced to emigrate, largely to the United States and Palestine, leading to a global displacement of Jews all across Europe. He also argues that as Kishinev was home of many powerful Zionists and was well known throughout all of Russia, this led to the news of the Pogrom being spread further than if it had occurred in a lesser known town.

== Reception ==
Writing in Tablet, cultural critic Rokhl Kafrissen called the book "a pivotal moment in the study of pogroms" that "exploded many of the myths of Kishinev".

Author, screenwriter and film director Nicholas Meyer has said that his new “The Adventures of the Peculiar Protocols,” was inspired by Pogrom: Kishinev and the Tilt of History.
