= Steven J. Zipperstein =

Professor of Jewish Culture and History (born 1950)

Steven Zipperstein
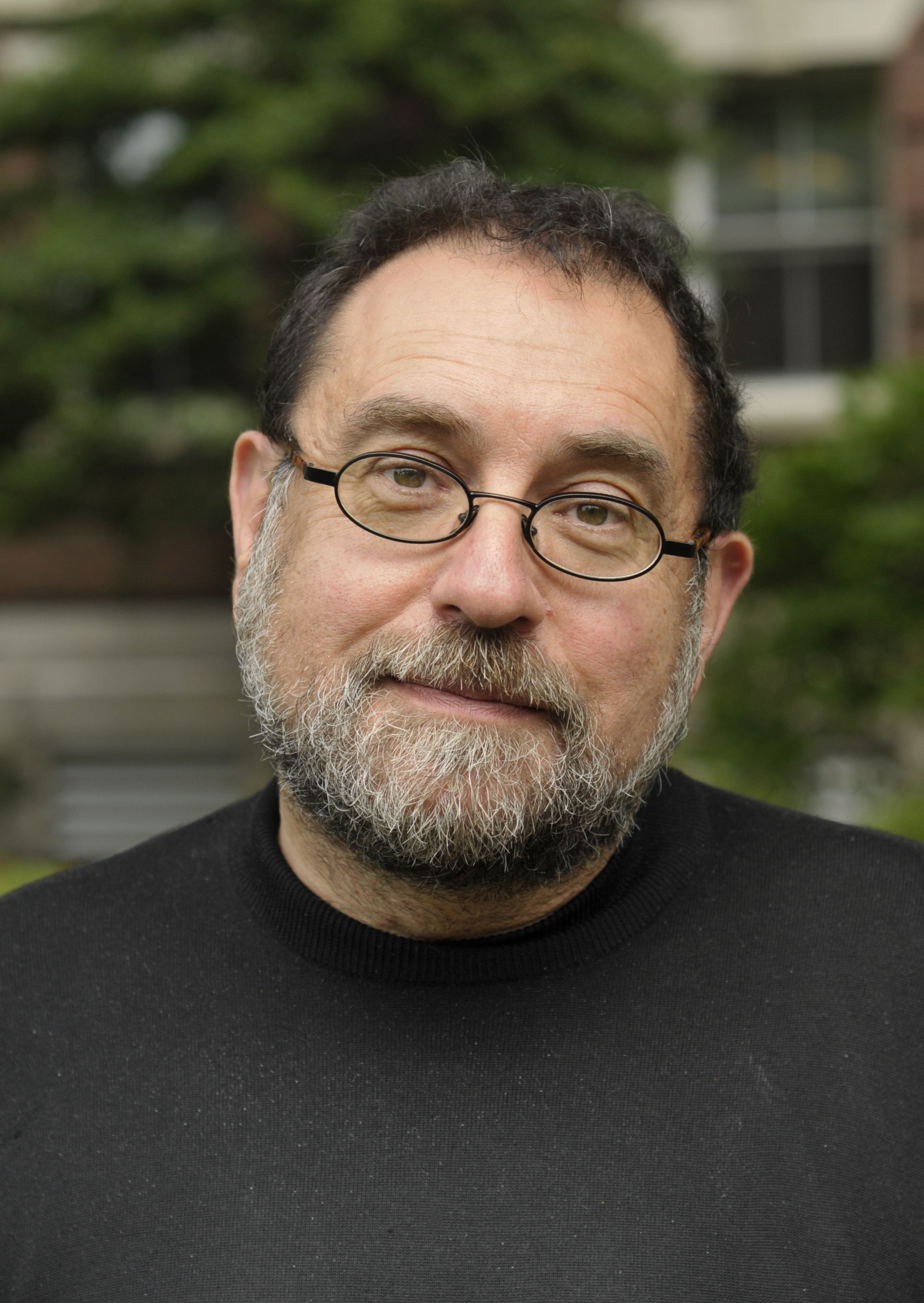
- Born: 1950 (age 75–76)
- Occupation: Historian

Academic work
- Discipline: Jewish history and culture
- Institutions: Stanford University

Steven J. Zipperstein (born 1950) is an American historian of Judaism and Jewish culture. The Daniel E. Koshland Professor in Jewish Culture and History at Stanford University, Zipperstein earned his B.A., M.A and Ph.D. at the University of California at Los Angeles.

In 1993 Zipperstein accepted an invitation to teach Jewish Studies for a semester at the Russian State University for the Humanities, Russia's main center for Archival Studies in Moscow. He was elected to the American Academy of Arts and Sciences in 2023.

He has reviewed books for various outlets, including for the New York Times. He has also served as an editor of the journal Jewish Social Studies: History, Culture and Society.

In a 2020 article published in The Atlantic, Zipperstein explores the reasons behind the enduring impact of The Protocols of the Elders of Zion, a fabricated text promoting antisemitic conspiracy theories. He states that "The Protocols has survived, more so than any other text of its kind ... not because its ideas are particularly original. ... It has done so for the simple reason that The Protocols is ... a compelling read. Conspiracy theories are many things, but most of all, they're narratives ... complete with the arcs and the rhythms of any other epic tale. ... Part of what makes certain ones endure is how well they unfurl that story.

As of 2024, Zipperstein is working on a biography of Philip Roth and has commented on the controversy surrounding another Roth biography, Philip Roth: The Biography, by Blake Bailey. Despite that book being temporarily pulled from publication due to sexual assault allegations against Bailey, Zipperstein believes it deserves to be published due to what he sees as its thorough research. Zipperstein, who had an amicable personal relationship with Roth, plans to publish his own biography in the future. He aims to provide a deeper literary analysis of Roth's work, exploring why he held such a prominent place in the cultural landscape.

== Views ==
In a letter to the editor titled "Divestment at Stanford is a Distraction," published in The Stanford Daily in January 2015, Zipperstein addressed the then-ongoing debate surrounding the push for Stanford University to divest from companies allegedly complicit in the Israeli occupation of Palestinian territories. The divestment campaign, part of the broader Boycott, Divestment, and Sanctions (BDS) movement, had gained traction on several university campuses, including Stanford, with the goal of pressuring Israel to change its policies toward Palestinians. Zipperstein, while making clear his opposition to the Israeli occupation, argues that divestment is a misguided and divisive tactic. He states it reduces a complex geopolitical issue to a simplistic moral stance, leading to polarization on campus rather than fostering productive dialogue. This opposition to divestment put him at odds with Stanford historian colleagues such as Joel Beinin.

== Awards ==
- Leviant Prize of the Modern Language Association (2006)
- Judah L. Magnes Gold Medal (1997)

== Books ==
- Philip Roth: Stung by Life (Yale University Press, 2025)
- Pogrom: Kishinev and the Tilt of History (Liveright, 2018)
- Rosenfeld's Lives: Fame, Oblivion, and the Furies of Writing (Yale University Press, 2009)
- The Worlds of S. An-sky: A Russian Jewish Intellectual at the Turn of the Century edited volume; co-edited with Gabriella Safran (Stanford University Press, 2006)
- Imagining Russian Jewry: Memory, History, Identity (University of Washington Press, 1999)
- Ahad Ha'am Elusive Prophet: Ahad Ha'am and the origins of Zionism (California University Press, 1993)
- The Jews of Odessa: A Cultural History, 1794-1881. Stanford, CA: Stanford University Press. 1985. ISBN 9780804766845.
