= Victor Sebestyen =

Hungarian journalist and author (born 1956)

- Born: 1956 (age 69–70); Budapest, Hungary
- Occupations: Journalist; author

Victor Sebestyen (born 1956) is a journalist and author of Eastern Europe, Russia, and Communism.

== Early life ==
Victor was born in 1956 in Budapest. He was a child when his family left Hungary as refugees.

== Career ==
As a journalist, he has worked for numerous British newspapers, including The London Evening Standard, T‍he Times and T‍he Daily Mail. He has contributed to many American publications, including T‍he New York Times. He reported widely from Eastern Europe when Communism collapsed and t‍he Berlin Wall came down in 1989. He covered t‍he wars in former Yugoslavia and t‍he breakup of t‍he Soviet Union. At T‍he London Evening Standard he was foreign editor, media editor and chief leader writer. He was an associate editor at Newsweek.

His first book, Twelve Days (Weidenfeld and Nicolson, 2006, Pant‍heon 2006), was an acclaimed history of t‍he 1956 Hungarian Uprising. It was translated into 12 languages. His second, Revolution 1989 (W&N 2009, Pant‍heon 2009) was a highly praised account of t‍he fall of t‍he Soviet empire. In 2017 he published Lenin the Dictator, a full-scale biography of the founder of the first Communist state, which was shortlisted for the Longford Prize in the UK, the Plutarch Award and the PEN Jacqueline Bograd Weld Award for biography in the US.

He has been a speaker at universities, literary festivals and conferences throughout Europe and t‍he United States. He sat on T‍he Advisory Council of T‍he UK based in Wilton Park, the think tank and discussion forum for international affairs.

His latest books are The Russian Revolution, published in June 2023, and Weimar Germany: The Death of a Democracy, published in 2026.

== Lenin: The Man, The Dictator, and the Master of Terror ==
In his quest for power, he promised people anything and everything. He offered simple solutions to complex problems. He lied unashamedly. He identified a scapegoat he could later label 'enemies of the people'. He justified himself on the basis that winning meant everything: the ends justified the means. ... Lenin was the godfather of what commentators a century after his time call 'post-truth politics'.

— Victor Sebestyen, Lenin: The Man, The Dictator, and the Master of Terror

He built a system based on the idea that political terror against opponents was justified for a greater end. It was perfected by Stalin, but the ideas were Lenin's. He had not always been a bad man, but he did terrible things. Angelica Balabanova, one of his old comrades who admired him for many years but grew to fear and loathe him, said perceptively that 'Lenin's tragedy was, in Goethe's phrase, he desired the good ... but created evil'.

— Victor Sebestyen, Lenin: The Man, The Dictator, and the Master of Terror

== Selected publications ==
- Twelve Days: The Story of the 1956 Hungarian Revolution. Pantheon Books, 2006.
- Revolution 1989: The Fall of the Soviet Empire. Hachette, 2009.
- 1946: The Making of the Modern World. Macmillan, 2014.
- Sebestyen, Victor (2017). Lenin: The Man, the Dictator, and the Master of Terror. Pantheon Books. ISBN 9781101871638.
- Budapest - Between East and West. Weidenfeld & Nicolson, 2022.
- The Russian Revolution. Bloomsbury, 2023.
- Weimar Germany: The Death of a Democracy. Weiídenfeld and Nicolson, 2026.

=== Articles ===
- Sebestyen, Victor (6 October 2020). "Did the U.S. Try to Assassinate Lenin in 1918?". New York Times Book Review.
- Sebestyen, Victor (20 August 2011). "The K.G.B.'s Bathhouse Plot". International New York Times. p. SR4.

== See also ==
- Hungarian Revolution of 1956
