= Kerri K. Greenidge =

American historian and academic

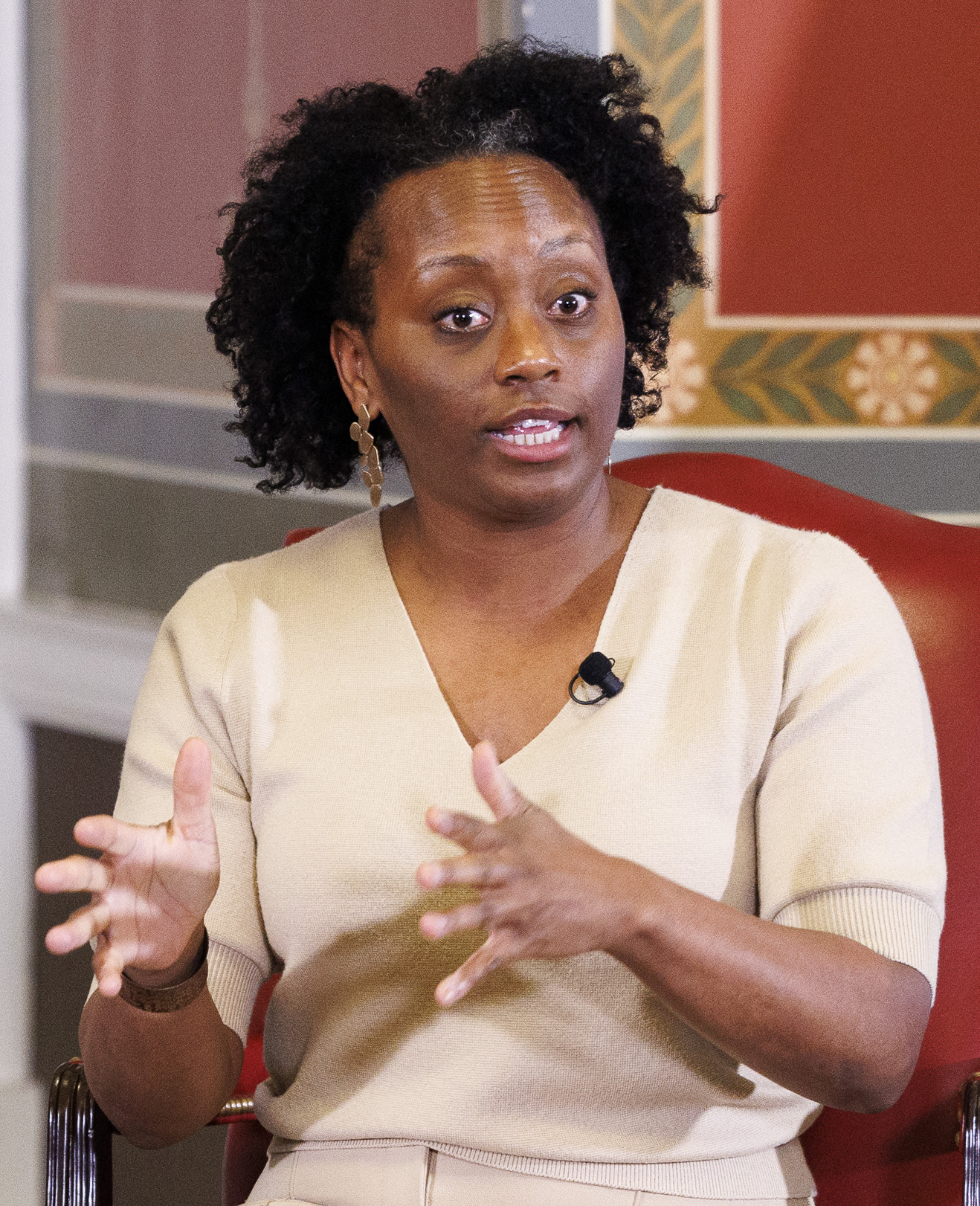
- Greenidge in 2024
- Occupation: Historian
- Awards: Mark Lynton History Prize

Kerri K. Greenidge is an American historian and former academic. Her book Black Radical: The Life and Times of William Monroe Trotter, a biography of civil rights activist William Monroe Trotter, won the 2020 Mark Lynton History Prize. In 2026 following allegations of fraud regarding her book The Grimkes: The Legacy of Slavery in an American Family Tufts stated that Greenidge was no longer employed by the university.

== Career ==
Greenidge was the Mellon Associate Professor in the Department of Studies in Race, Colonialism, and Diaspora at Tufts University, director of American Studies and co-director of the African American Trail Project at Tufts' Center for the Study of Race and Democracy.

Previously Greenidge worked as a historian for the Boston African American National Historic Site. During this time, she wrote and published Boston Abolitionists, a short history of the role that Black leaders in Boston's Beacon Hill neighborhood played in the Abolitionist Movement in the pre–Civil War era. Her research focused on the role that African-American literature has played in the Civil Rights Movement and particularly its more radical expressions in Boston during the Progressive Era, and its intersection with populism in the Democratic Party.

Greenidge signed the 2020 A Letter on Justice and Open Debate, but asked later for her name to be removed from the letter. Her request was granted.

Greenidge's 2022 book The Grimkes: The Legacy of Slavery in an American Family was a finalist for the 2023 National Book Critics Circle award in biography. In its review, the New York Times noted that Greenidge established "the [Grimke] sisters' contributions to abolition and women's rights were undergirded by the privileges they reaped from slavery."

In 2023 Smithsonian named the book one of the ten best history books of 2022. It was shortlisted for the Los Angeles Times Book Prize for History in the same year. In 2023, the book also won the Joan Kelly Memorial Prize from the American Historical Association, but it was withdrawn after serious allegations to the work were raised and the book was pulled from publication.

== Research fabrication allegations ==
Several historians have alleged that Greenidge's 2022 book The Grimkes contained factual inaccuracies and citation problems. After receiving complaints in December 2022, Tufts University conducted an external peer review and concluded that the book contained "multiple errors of fact and citation". In 2024 retired professor of American history Myra Glenn wrote that the book "lacks the evidence to substantiate many of her major claims" and that it is "riddled with factual errors and repeatedly omits needed endnotes."

Greenidge denied fabricating or plagiarizing material, acknowledged that some citations may have been misattributed, and argued that the criticism and review process were racially motivated. The university rejected allegations of bias and stated that its review had been "fair, fact-based, thorough, and objective". Greenidge is no longer employed by Tufts after being placed on leave in October 2025, and her publisher, W. W. Norton & Company, removed The Grimkes from its website. Concerns have also been raised by historian Stephen Fox regarding Greenidge's 2019 book Black Radical.

The City of Boston had awarded Greenidge half of a $500,000 contract in 2024 to study the city's contributions to slavery. The City stated they were unaware of the fraud allegations at the time of awarding the contract. Northeastern University, who had been awarded the other half of the contract, successfully delivered their research in 2025. However, the report from Greenidge's team at Tufts was never submitted. In September 2026 the City and Tufts announced that they had agreed to cancel the contract and refund the $335,000 to the City. City task force members stated that "the information compiled by Tufts researchers could not be authenticated or used in the group’s final report."

== Personal life ==
Greenidge was born in Brooklyn and grew up in Arlington, Massachusetts. She has divorced parents and lived with her mother Ariel. Her sisters are the playwright Kirsten Greenidge and the novelist Kaitlyn Greenidge.

Greenidge received a PhD from Boston University in 2012.

== Publications ==
- Greenidge, Kerri (2006). Boston's Abolitionists. Commonwealth Editions. ISBN 978-1-93321-219-7.
- Greenidge, Kerri (2019). Black Radical: The Life and Times of William Monroe Trotter. Liveright. ISBN 978-1-63149-875-6.
- Greenidge, Kerri (2022). The Grimkes: The Legacy of Slavery in an American Family. Liveright. ISBN 978-1-32409-084-7.

== Recognition ==
- 2020 - Mark Lynton History Prize
- 2023 - American Historical Association Joan Kelly Memorial Prize (withdrawn 2026)
