= King: A Life =

2023 biography by Jonathan Eig

- Author: Jonathan Eig
- Subject: Biography
- Publisher: Farrar, Straus and Giroux
- Publication date: May 16, 2023
- Pages: 688
- ISBN: 9780374279295

King: A Life is a 2023 biography of Martin Luther King Jr. by Jonathan Eig. It won the 2024 Pulitzer Prize for Biography and was a finalist for the 2024 National Book Critics Circle Award for Biography. The audiobook version, published by Macmillan Audio and narrated by the author, won the 2024 Audie award for best Non-Fiction Narrator.

Universal Pictures optioned the biography. A biopic is set for production with Amblin Partners. Kristie Macosko Krieger is set to produce the film with Steven Spielberg as an executive producer. Chris Rock is in talks to direct and produce the biopic.

== Bibliography ==
- Altschuler, Glenn C. (May 12, 2023). "Review: 'King: A Life' takes a fresh, unvarnished look at a civil rights icon". Star Tribune.
- DeGroot, Gerard (May 17, 2023). "King by Jonathan Eig review — Martin Luther King, a lying, cheating American hero". The Times. ISSN 0140-0460.
- Garner, Dwight (May 8, 2023). "The New Definitive Biography of Martin Luther King Jr". The New York Times. ISSN 0362-4331.
- Mack, Kenneth W. (May 27, 2023). "King: The Life of Martin Luther King by Jonathan Eig review – a story that speaks to our times". The Guardian. ISSN 0261-3077.
- Mathews, Jessica T. (August 22, 2023). "King: A Life". Foreign Affairs. Vol. 102, no. 5. ISSN 0015-7120.
- Power-Greene, Ousmane (May 18, 2023). "'King: A Life,' Jonathan Eig's deeply researched new MLK biography, reveals a man beset by insecurity and personal doubt but grounded in moral conviction". The Boston Globe.
- Sanneh, Kelefa (May 8, 2023). "Martin Luther King, Jr., and the Perilous Power of Respectability". The New Yorker. ISSN 0028-792X.
- Schlichenmeyer, Terri (May 23, 2023). "Book Review: Jonathan Eig shows MLK as the flawed, exhausted human in 'King: A Life'". The Philadelphia Tribune.
