= Ali: A Life =

2018 biography by Jonathan Eig

- First Edition
- Author: Jonathan Eig
- Language: English
- Genre: Biography
- Set in: United States of America
- Publisher: Simon & Schuster
- Publication date: October 3, 2017
- Publication place: United States of America
- Media type: Print (hardcover, paperback)
- Pages: 640
- ISBN: 9781471155956 (first edition)

Ali: A Life is a biography written by American biographer Jonathan Eig. It was first published in 2018 by Simon & Schuster. The biography is about Muhammad Ali.

== Synopsis ==
Ali: A Life is a biography, chronicling the life of Muhammad Ali, who was previously known as Cassius Clay. Jonathan Eig wrote the book after conducting interviews with 500 people who knew Ali.

== Reception ==
In 2019 Men's Health named Ali: A Life the 23rd best sports book of all time. In 2020, Esquire called Ali one of the 35 best sports books ever written. In a review, Joyce Carol Oates of The New York Times noted that "...As Muhammad Ali's life was an epic of a life so Ali: A Life is an epic of a biography." It was a finalist for the 2017 NAACP Image Awards, William Hill Sports Book of the Year. It was a finalist for the 2018 Plutarch Award. It won the 2018 PEN/ESPN Award for Literary Sports Writing It also won the 2018 The Times Biography of the Year and overall Sports Book of the Year, for the 2018 British Sports Book Awards. Thomas Hauser, Ali's previous biographer, wrote a more critical review identifying factual errors, inaccuracies about Ali's boxing achievements, and for failing to capture what made Ali an inspiration.
