= Custer's Trials =

Biography of Custer, written by T. J. Stiles

Custer's Trials: A Life on the Frontier of a New America
- Author: T. J. Stiles
- Language: English
- Genre: Non-fiction
- Publisher: Alfred A. Knopf
- Publication date: 2015
- Publication place: United States
- Pages: 608

Custer's Trials: A Life on the Frontier of a New America is a biography of George Armstrong Custer by T. J. Stiles. It won the 2016 Pulitzer Prize for History.
