= Yohuru Williams =

American historian

Yohuru R. Williams
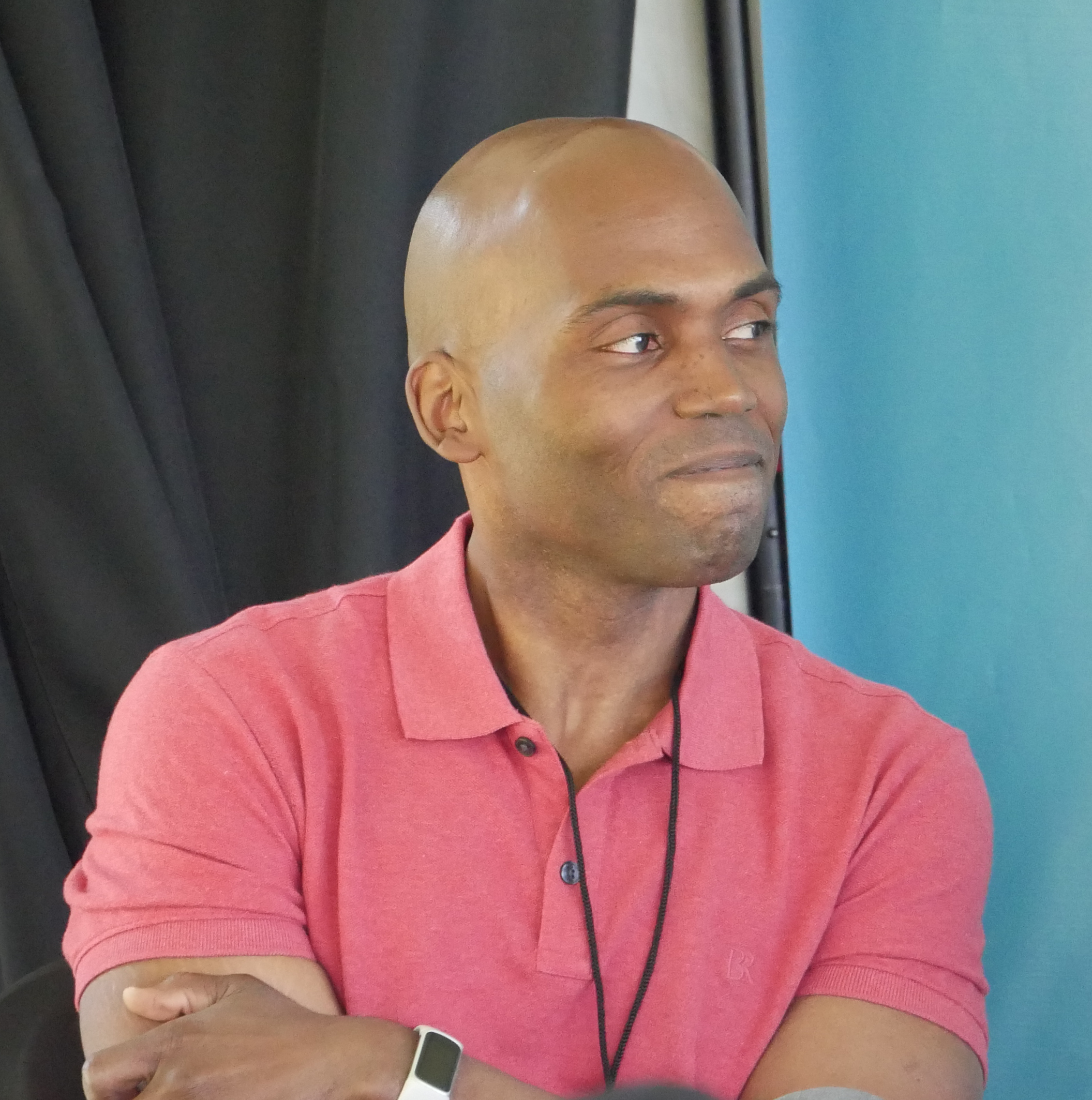

Dean of Fairfield University College of Arts and Sciences
- In office 2015–2017
- Preceded by: Robbin Crabtree
- Succeeded by: Richard Greenwald

Dean of University of St. Thomas College of Arts and Sciences
- In office 2017–2020
- Preceded by: Terrance Langan
- Succeeded by: Mark Stansbury-O’Donnell

Personal details
- Born: Bridgeport, Connecticut
- Education: Scranton, B.A., M.A. Howard, Ph.D
- Occupation: Professor; Administrator

Yohuru R. Williams is an American academic, author and activist. Williams is a Distinguished University Chair and Professor of History and Founding Director of the Racial Justice Initiative at the University of St. Thomas in St. Paul, Minnesota. He was previously the dean of the College of Arts and Sciences at the University of St. Thomas. Before that, Williams was a professor of history and the dean of the College of Arts and Sciences at Fairfield University and former chief historian of the Jackie Robinson Foundation. Williams is a notable scholar of the Civil Rights and Black Power movements. In 2009, Diverse magazine named Williams one of its Top 10 Emerging Scholars Under 40.

== Early life and education ==
Williams was born in Bridgeport, Connecticut, and is a graduate of the Fairfield College Preparatory School in Fairfield, Connecticut. He earned a bachelor's degree in political science and a master's degree in history from the University of Scranton in 1993. He then earned a doctorate degree in history from Howard University in 1998.

== Career ==
Williams is a member of the faculty of University of St. Thomas where he is a nationally recognized expert on social studies pedagogy and history curriculum. He began his career as a professor of History at Delaware State University where he also served as Director of Black Studies and Social Studies Education. He joined the faculty at Fairfield University in 2005. Williams became a full professor in 2012 and then served as the chair of the history department and the director of black studies. In 2014, Williams became the associate VP for academic affairs and was awarded the Fairfield University Martin Luther King Jr. Vision Award. In 2015, he became the interim dean of the College of Arts and Sciences.

During a brief leave from Fairfield University, from 2011-2012, Williams served as Vice President for Public Outreach and Community Education at the Jackie Robinson Foundation in New York City. Williams continued on as the chief historian for the Jackie Robinson Foundation from 2012 to 2014.

Williams has made a variety of local and national media appearances, most notably in Stanley Nelson's 2016 documentary "The Black Panthers: Vanguard of the Revolution", as a primary commentator in Ken Burns 2016 PBS documentary "Jackie Robinson" and on the History Channel's online documentary on the World War I "Harlem Hell Fighters." In September 2016, he appeared as a guest commentator with Marc Lamont Hill during BET live coverage of the historic opening of the National Museum of African American History and Culture on the National Mall in Washington, DC. He is a regular political commentator on the Cliff Kelley Show on WVON, Chicago. He is also a frequent writer for The Huffington Post and LA Progressive.

In 2016, Williams joined the board of directors of the Network for Public Education and the board of trustees of the University of Scranton.

Williams serves on the advisory board of Voters of Tomorrow, an advocacy organization that promotes political engagement among Generation Z.

== Scholarly work ==
William research interests include African American history, civil rights, Black Power movements, African-American constitutional and legal history, urban history and 20th-century American history. He is author or co-author of several books on the civil rights and black power movements. His scholarly articles have appeared in the American Bar Association's Insights on Law and Society, The Organization of American Historians Magazine of History, The Black Scholar, The Journal of Black Studies, Pennsylvania History, Delaware History, and the Black History Bulletin.

== Books ==
- Williams, Yohuru (2016). The Black Panthers: Portraits from an Unfinished Revolution. Nation Books. ISBN 978-1-56858-555-0.
- Williams, Yohuru (2015). Rethinking the Black Freedom Movement. Taylor & Francis. ISBN 978-0-415-82614-3.
- Williams, Yohuru (2009). Liberated Territory: Untold Local Perspectives on the Black Panther Party. Duke University Press Books. ISBN 978-0-8223-4326-4.
- Williams, Yohuru (2008). Teaching U.S. History Beyond the Textbook. Corwin. ISBN 978-1-4129-6621-4.
- Williams, Yohuru (2000). Black Politics/White Power: Civil Rights Black Power and Black Panthers in New Haven. Brandywine Press. ISBN 1-881089-60-6.
