= Les Payne =

American journalist (1941–2018)

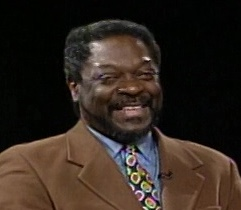
- Born: July 12, 1941; Tuscaloosa, Alabama, U.S.
- Died: March 19, 2018 (aged 76)
- Education: University of Connecticut
- Organization(s): United States Army, Newsday
- Notable work: National Association of Black Journalists
- Awards: Pulitzer Prize, National Book Award for Nonfiction

Leslie Payne (July 12, 1941 – March 19, 2018) was an American journalist. He served as an editor and columnist at Newsday and was a founder of the National Association of Black Journalists. Payne received a Pulitzer Prize in 1974 for his investigative reporting, and, with daughter Tamara Payne, the 2020 National Book Award for Nonfiction and the 2021 Pulitzer Prize for Biography for his biography The Dead Are Arising: The Life of Malcolm X.

== Biography ==
=== Early years ===
Payne was born in Tuscaloosa, Alabama, in 1941. In 1954, Payne moved with his mother to Hartford, Connecticut, where she remarried. According to DNA analysis, he was descended in part from people from Cameroon.

The first member of his family to attend college, Payne graduated from the University of Connecticut in 1964 with a degree in English. He was interested in pursuing a career in journalism, but as an African American he found no opportunities in the mainstream press. Instead, Payne joined the U.S. Army, where he eventually became a captain. He ended his Army career with two years as an information officer, writing speeches for General William Westmoreland and running the Army newspaper.

=== Career ===
Newsday hired Payne in 1969 as an investigative reporter. In 1973, he helped write "The Heroin Trail", a series of 33 articles that detailed how heroin that originated in Turkish poppy fields found its way to the streets of New York City. Newsday won the 1974 Pulitzer Prize for Public Service for "The Heroin Trail". Next year, it was published as a book credited to the newspaper staff, The Heroin Trail (Holt, Rinehart and Winston, 1975).

In 1975, Payne and other African Americans working in the media established the National Association of Black Journalists. Payne served as the group's fourth president.

Payne co-wrote a series of articles about the Symbionese Liberation Army and the kidnapping of Patty Hearst. These became the basis of his next book, The Life and Death of the SLA (Ballantine Books, 1976), credited to "Les Payne and Tim Findley, with Carolyn Craven". Payne's reporting from South Africa during the 1976 Soweto Uprising was selected by the jury for a Pulitzer Prize in International Journalism, but the group's advisory board overruled their decision with no explanation. Despite being barred from the country, Payne returned to South Africa in 1985 to chronicle the changes that had taken place during the intervening years.

Payne started writing a weekly column for Newsday in 1980. It was syndicated in 1985. In 2006, Newsday's editor said the column was "so strong, so provocative and generated so much hate mail that Newsday editors got to know the names of all the Suffolk County Police Department's bomb-sniffing dogs".

Payne served as Newsday's national editor and assistant managing editor for foreign and national news; at different times, he was responsible for the newspaper's coverage of health and science, New York City, and investigations. He was responsible for New York Newsday, the newspaper's short-lived attempt to compete in the New York City market. His staff won many journalism awards, including six Pulitzer Prizes.

After retiring from Newsday in February 2006, Payne continued to contribute his column to the paper until December 2008. In his retirement, he co-wrote a biography of Malcolm X, which was published in 2020 as The Dead Are Arising: The Life of Malcolm X and won that year's National Book Award for Nonfiction and the 2021 Pulitzer Prize for Biography. The book is framed by essays from Tamara Payne, Payne's daughter and primary researcher, who completed the biography after her father's death. The book is described as a "powerful and revelatory account of the civil rights activist, built from dozens of interviews, offering insight into his character, beliefs and the forces that shaped him."

Les Payne died on March 19, 2018, following a heart attack. In 2019, the Society of Professional Journalists - New York City Chapter (also known as The Deadline Club), which had previously named Payne to the 2017 New York Journalism Hall of Fame, named a category of the annual Deadline Awards after Payne: Les Payne Award for Coverage on Communities of Color.

== See also ==
- French Connection
