= G-Man: J. Edgar Hoover and the Making of the American Century =

2022 book by Beverly Gage

- Author: Beverly Gage
- Genre: Biography
- Publisher: Viking Press
- Publication date: November 22, 2022
- Pages: 837
- ISBN: 9780670025374

G-Man: J. Edgar Hoover and the Making of the American Century is a biography of long-time FBI director J. Edgar Hoover by historian Beverly Gage, first published by Viking Press in 2022. As the first biography of Hoover in 30 years, the 800-page volume uses new sources uncovered by Freedom of Information Act requests.

The book received multiple prizes: the 2023 Pulitzer Prize for Biography, the 2023 Bancroft Prize, the 2023 Barbara and David Zalaznick Book Prize in American History, the 2023 Los Angeles Times Book Prize for Biography, and the 2022 National Book Critics Circle Award for Biography.

== Critical response ==
The book earned acclaim from various sources; it was named a Best Book of 2022 by The Atlantic, The Washington Post, and Smithsonian magazine and a New York Times Top 100 Notable Books of 2022.

The Washington Post stated: "Masterful ... This book is an enduring, formidable accomplishment, a monument to the power of biography [that] now becomes the definitive work."

The Wall Street Journal also reviewed the book, calling it "A nuanced portrait in a league with the best of Ron Chernow and David McCullough."
