= Beverly Gage =

American history professor at Yale

- Gage in 2026
- Title: Member of the National Council on the Humanities

Beverly Gage is an American historian who is a professor of history and American studies at Yale University, where she was the director of the Brady-Johnson Program in Grand Strategy. She won a Pulitzer Prize for her 2022 book G-Man: J. Edgar Hoover and the Making of the American Century, and also wrote The Day Wall Street Exploded: A Story of America in Its First Age of Terror in 2009. In 2021, Gage was nominated to the National Council on the Humanities, and she was formerly a National Fellow for the Jefferson Scholars Foundation. In 2026, Gage's book This Land is Your Land: A Road Trip Through U.S. History was published by Simon & Schuster.

== Education and career ==
Gage attended Yale College as an undergraduate, graduating in 1994 with a degree in American studies, then earned her Ph.D. in history at Columbia University in 2004.

In September 2021, she announced that she would resign as director of the Grand Strategy program, effective December 2021, citing concerns about academic freedom and a "board of visitors" that was formed at the behest of Yale donors Charles B. Johnson and Nicholas F. Brady to oversee her work. In an interview with The New York Times, she stated, "It's very difficult to teach effectively or creatively in a situation where you are being second-guessed and undermined and not protected." On October 1, 2021, the Yale history department issued a statement in support of her.

Her 2022 biography of J. Edgar Hoover, G-Man, received the 2023 Pulitzer Prize for Biography, the 2023 Bancroft Prize and Barbara and David Zalaznick Book Prize in American History. It was a finalist for the 2023 National Book Critics Circle Award for Biography.
