= Jonathan Eig =

American journalist and biographer (born 1964)

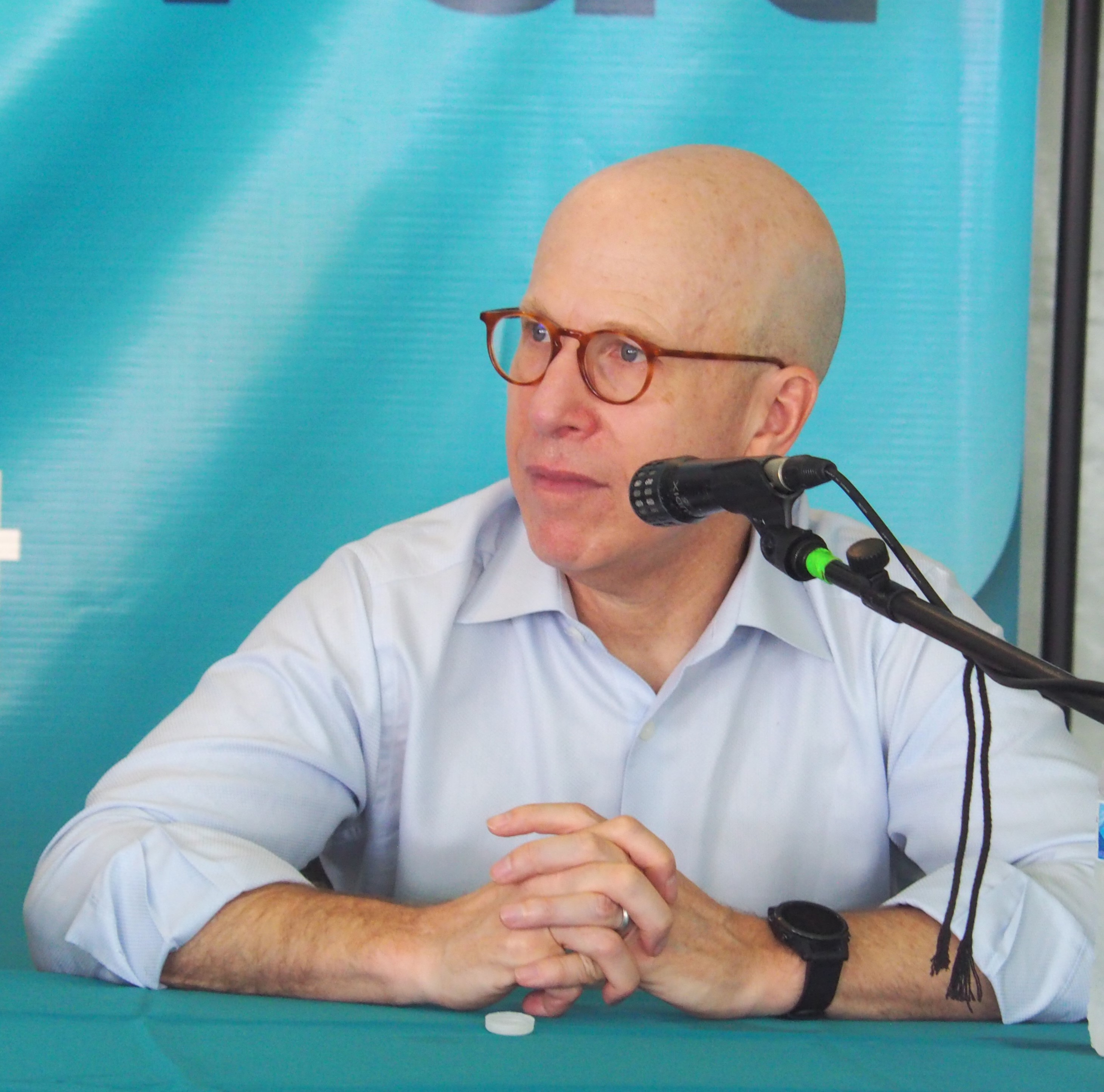
- Eig in 2019
- Born: April 26, 1964 (age 62); Brooklyn, New York, U.S.
- Education: Northwestern University
- Occupations: Journalist; biographer
- Spouse: Jennifer Tescher
- Children: 3
- Writing career
- Subjects: American history; sports
- Notable work: King: A Life
- Notable awards: Casey Award (2005); Pulitzer Prize for Biography (2024)

Jonathan Eig (US: /ˈaɪɡ/; born April 26, 1964) is an American journalist and biographer. He is the author of six books, the most recent being King: A Life (2023), a Pulitzer Prize-winning biography of Martin Luther King Jr.

== Biography ==
Eig was born in Brooklyn, New York, and grew up in Monsey, New York. He is Jewish. His father was an accountant and his mother was a stay-at-home mom and community activist. Eig began working for his hometown newspaper when he was 16. He attended Northwestern University's Medill School of Journalism, graduating in 1986 with a bachelor's degree. After college he worked as a news reporter for the New Orleans Times-Picayune, The Dallas Morning News, Chicago magazine, and The Wall Street Journal. Eig has taught writing at Columbia College Chicago and lectures at Northwestern. He has written as a freelancer for many outlets, including The New York Times, Washington Post, and online edition of The New Yorker. He is married to Jennifer Tescher and has three children. He lives in Chicago.

Eig appeared on The Daily Show with Jon Stewart in May 2010. He has appeared in three PBS documentaries—Prohibition, Jackie Robinson and Muhammad Ali—made by Ken Burns and Florentine Films.

In 2016, Eig appeared on AMC's The Making of the Mob: Chicago, talking about Al Capone.

== Reception ==
In 2019, Men's Health magazine named Eig's book Ali: A Life the 23rd best sports book of all time. In 2020, Esquire magazine called Ali one of the 35 best sports books ever written. Esquire also called Eig's book Luckiest Man one of the 100 best baseball books of all time.

Eig's first book was Luckiest Man: The Life and Death of Lou Gehrig (2005). Opening Day: The Story of Jackie Robinson's First Season was his second book. For his third book, Get Capone, Eig discovered thousands of pages of never-before-reported government documents on the government's case against Capone. The Birth of the Pill (2014), Eig's fourth book, told the story of the renegades who invented the first oral contraceptive. It was announced in 2016 that The Birth of the Pill had been optioned for television as a drama. Meanwhile, The Birth of the Pill was adapted into a play by Jessica Huang, commissioned by Chicago's TimeLine Theatre Company. It was workshopped in New York in 2023 and it premiered at TimeLine in September 2026. Eig is portrayed as a character within the play.

In a 2017 review of Ali: A Life, Joyce Carol Oates, writing for The New York Times, said: "This richly researched, sympathetic yet unsparing portrait of a controversial figure for whom the personal and the political dramatically fused could not come at a more appropriate time in our beleaguered American history…. As Muhammad Ali's life was an epic of a life so Ali: A Life is an epic of a biography. Much in its pages will be familiar to those with some knowledge of boxing but even the familiar may be glimpsed from a new perspective in Eig's fluent prose; for pages in succession its narrative reads like a novel — a suspenseful novel with a cast of vivid characters who prevail through decades and who help to define the singular individual who was both a brilliantly innovative, incomparably charismatic heavyweight boxer and a public figure whose iconic significance shifted radically through the decades as in an unlikely fairy tale in which the most despised athlete in American history becomes, by the 21st century, the most beloved athlete in American history."

In 2023, Eig published a biography of Martin Luther King Jr., King: A Life, which went on to win the 2024 Pulitzer Prize for Biography. Reviewing the book for The New York Times, Dwight Garner stated that it "supplants David J. Garrow's 1986 biography Bearing the Cross as the definitive life of King".

== Published works ==
- Luckiest Man: The Life and Death of Lou Gehrig (2005)
- Opening Day: The Story of Jackie Robinson's First Season (2007)
- Get Capone: The Secret Plot that Captured America's Most Wanted Gangster (2010)
- The Birth of the Pill: How Four Crusaders Reinvented Sex and Launched a Revolution (2014)
- Ali: A Life (2017)
- King: A Life (2023)

== Awards ==
- 2005: Casey Award for best baseball book of the year, Luckiest Man
- 2014:: Washington Post "Best Books of the Year" for The Birth of the Pill
- 2015: Society of Midland Authors, non-fiction book of the year, The Birth of the Pill
- 2017: NAACP Image Awards, finalist, Ali: A Life
- 2017: William Hill Sports Book of the Year, best sports book, finalist, Ali: A Life
- 2018: Plutarch Award, best biography, finalist, Ali: A Life
- 2018: PEN/ESPN Award for Literary Sports Writing, Literary Sports Writing, winner for Ali: A Life
- 2018: The Times Biography of the Year, Sports Book Awards, London, for Ali: A Life
- 2018: Sports Book of the Year, British Sports Book Awards, for Ali: A Life
- 2018: New York Times Notable Book, for Ali: A Life
- 2023: New York Times Notable Book, for King: A Life
- 2023: National Book Awards, long list for King: A Life
- 2023: National Book Critics Circle Award for Biography, finalist for King: A Life
- 2024: New-York Historical Society's 2024 Barbara and David Zalaznick Book Prize for King: A Life
- 2024: Pulitzer Prize for Biography, for King: A Life
