= List of After Words interviews first aired in 2011 =

After Words is an American television series on the C-SPAN2 network’s weekend programming schedule known as Book TV. The program is an hour-long talk show, each week featuring an interview with the author of a new nonfiction book. The program has no regular host. Instead, each author is paired with a guest host who is familiar with the author or the subject matter of their book.

First air date (Links to video)	Interviewee(s)	Interviewer(s)	Book	Topic of interview / Comments
January 2, 2011	William Hartung	Pierre Sprey	Prophets of War	Lockheed Martin
January 8, 2011	Eduardo Porter	Daniel Gross	The Price of Everything: Solving the Mystery of Why We Pay What We Do	
January 17, 2011	Clarence Jones	Herb Boyd	Behind the Dream	March on Washington for Jobs and Freedom, The "I Have a Dream" speech
January 22, 2011	Bill Kristol	David Brooks	The Neoconservative Persuasion	Bill Kristol discusses The Neoconservative Persuasion by his late father Irving Kristol, for which he (Bill) wrote the foreword.
January 29, 2011	Peter Bergen	Max Boot	The Longest War: The Enduring Conflict between America and Al-Qaeda	War on terror
February 5, 2011	Michael Reagan	John Avlon	The New Reagan Revolution	
February 14, 2011	George Friedman	Susan Glasser	The Next Decade	
February 19, 2011	Carole Simpson	Nia-Malika Henderson	NewsLady	
February 26, 2011	Susan Jacoby	Sylvia Smith	Never Say Die	
March 5, 2011	Rubin Carter	Juan Williams	Eye of the Hurricane	
March 12, 2011	Peter Firstbrook	Dinesh D'Souza	The Obamas: The Untold Story of an African Family	Family of Barack Obama
March 19, 2011	Dambisa Moyo	Dan Mitchell	How the West Was Lost: Fifty Years of Economic Folly - and the Stark Choices Ahead	
March 26, 2011	Leah McGrath Goodman	Jerry DiColo	The Asylum: The Renegades Who Hijacked the World's Oil Market	New York Mercantile Exchange
April 3, 2011	Ken Walsh	Julianne Malveaux	Family of Freedom: Presidents and African Americans in the White House	
April 9, 2011	Jeff Greenfield	Ted Koppel	Then Everything Changed: Stunning Alternate Histories of American Politics: JFK, RFK, Ford, Carter, Reagan	
April 16, 2011	Kevin Williamson	John Podhoretz	The Politically Incorrect Guide to Socialism	Socialism
April 23, 2011	Edward Lengel	Peter Henriques	Inventing George Washington	George Washington
April 30, 2011	Peter Godwin	Nicole Lee	The Fear: Robert Mugabe and the Martyrdom of Zimbabwe	Robert Mugabe
May 7, 2011	Andrew Breitbart	Armstrong Williams	Righteous Indignation: Excuse Me While I Save the World!	
May 14, 2011	William Cohan	Patrice Hill	Money and Power: How Goldman Sachs Came to Rule the World	Goldman Sachs
May 21, 2011	Frederick Kempe	Angela Stent	Berlin 1961	Berlin Crisis of 1961
May 28, 2011	Janny Scott	Major Garrett	A Singular Woman: The Untold Story of Barack Obama's Mother	Ann Dunham
June 4, 2011	Michael Totten	Richard Murphy	The Road to Fatima Gate: The Beirut Spring, the Rise of Hezbollah, and the Iranian War Against Israel	Cedar Revolution, 2006 Lebanon War
June 13, 2011	Henry Kissinger	Monica Crowley	On China	Sino-American relations
June 18, 2011	James Gleick	Frank Rose	The Information: A History, a Theory, a Flood	Information, Information Age
June 25, 2011	Erick Stakelbeck	Fred Grandy	The Terrorist Next Door: How the Government is Deceiving You about the Islamic Threat	
July 2, 2011	Eli Pariser	Clay Shirky	The Filter Bubble: What the Internet is Hiding From You	
July 9, 2011	Charles Hill	David Ignatius	Trial of a Thousand Years: World Order and Islamism	Islam
July 16, 2011	Jane Blair	Loretta Sanchez	Hesitation Kills: A Female Marine Officer's Combat Experience in Iraq	
July 23, 2011	Sally Jacobs	Ken Walsh	The Other Barack: The Bold and Reckless Life of President Obama's Father	Barack Obama, Sr.
July 30, 2011	Joby Warrick	Yochi Dreazen	The Triple Agent: The Al-Qaeda Mole who Infiltrated the CIA	
August 7, 2011	Amanda Foreman	Eric Foner	A World on Fire: Britain's Crucial Role in the American Civil War	Britain in the American Civil War
August 13, 2011	Jay Bahadur	Clifford May	The Pirates of Somalia: Inside Their Hidden World	Piracy in Somalia
August 20, 2011	Steven Brill	Diane Ravitch	Class Warfare: Inside the Fight to Fix America's Schools	
August 27, 2011	Ronald Bishop	Deborah Tannen	More: The Vanishing of Scale in an Over-the-Top Nation	
September 4, 2011	Randall Kennedy	April Ryan	The Persistence of the Color Line: Racial Politics and the Obama Presidency	
September 10, 2011	Dana Priest	Douglas Feith	Top Secret America: The Rise of the New American Security State	
September 17, 2011	Sylvia Nasar	Gillian Tett	Grand Pursuit: The Story of Economic Genius	History of economic thought
September 24, 2011	Jim Lehrer	Gloria Borger	Tension City: Inside the Presidential Debates from Kennedy-Nixon to McCain-Obama	United States presidential election debates
October 1, 2011	Bruce Bueno de Mesquita and Alastair Smith	Anne Gearan	The Dictator's Handbook: Why Bad Behavior is Almost Always Good Politics	
October 8, 2011	Susan Herman	Viet Dinh	Taking Liberties: The War on Terror and the Erosion of American Democracy	
October 17, 2011	Daniel Yergin	Dina Cappiello	The Quest: Energy, Security, and the Remaking of the Modern World	Energy industry
October 22, 2011	Nicholas Wapshott	Matthew Bishop	Keynes Hayek: The Clash That Defined Modern Economics	John Maynard Keynes, Friedrich Hayek
October 29, 2011	Bill Vlasic	Matt Blunt	Once Upon a Car: The Fall and Resurrection of America's Big Three Automakers - GM, Ford, and Chrysler	General Motors, Ford, Chrysler, Automotive industry crisis of 2008–2010
November 5, 2011	Mary Gabriel	Bertell Ollman	Love and Capital: Karl and Jenny Marx and the Birth of a Revolution	Karl Marx, Jenny von Westphalen
November 14, 2011	Corey Robin	S.E. Cupp	The Reactionary Mind: Conservatism from Edmund Burke to Sarah Palin	Conservatism
November 21, 2011	Pat Buchanan	Ralph Nader	Suicide of a Superpower: Will America Survive to 2025?	
November 26, 2011	Clifton Truman Daniel	Margaret Hoover	Dear Harry, Love Bess: Bess Truman's Letters to Harry Truman 1919-1943	Bess Truman, Harry Truman
December 3, 2011	Max Hastings	Toby Harnden	Inferno: The World at War, 1939-1945	World War II
December 10, 2011	Niall Ferguson	Susan Jacoby	Civilization: The West and the Rest	
December 17, 2011	Robert Guest	Cecilia Kang	Borderless Economics: Chinese Sea Turtles, Indian Fridges and the New Fruits of Global Capitalism	
December 24, 2011	Conor O'Clery	Thomas Blanton	Moscow, December 25, 1991: The Last Day of the Soviet Union	Dissolution of the Soviet Union
December 31, 2011	Michael Gazzaniga	Sally Satel	Who's in Charge?: Free Will and the Science of the Brain	Neuroscience
