= National Book Critics Circle Award for Biography =

Annual American literary award for biography

- Awarded for: "the finest books and reviews published in English"
- Sponsored by: National Book Critics Circle
- First award: 1983
- Website: https://www.bookcritics.org/awards

The National Book Critics Circle Award for Biography, established in 1983, is an annual American literary award presented by the National Book Critics Circle (NBCC) to promote "the finest books and reviews published in English." Awards are presented annually to books published in the U.S. during the preceding calendar year in six categories: Fiction, Nonfiction, Poetry, Memoir/Autobiography, Biography, and Criticism.

Books previously published in English are not eligible, such as re-issues and paperback editions. They do consider "translations, short story and essay collections, self published books, and any titles that fall under the general categories."

The judges are the volunteer directors of the NBCC who are 24 members serving rotating three-year terms, with eight elected annually by the voting members, namely "professional book review editors and book reviewers." Winners of the awards are announced each year at the NBCC awards ceremony in conjunction with the yearly membership meeting, which takes place in March.

Between 1983 and 2004, the award was presented jointly with autobiography.

== Recipients ==
National Book Critics Circle Award for Biography winners and finalists
Year	Author	Title	Subject	Result	Ref.
1983	Joyce Johnson	Minor Characters	the women of the Beat Generation	Winner	
1983	Kenneth R. Manning	Black Apollo of Science: The Life of Ernest Everett Just	Ernest Everett Just (1883–1941), pioneering African-American biologist, academic, and science writer	Finalist	
1983	Nicholas Gage	Eleni	the life of his late mother in Greece during World War II and the Greek Civil War	Finalist	
1983	E. Fuller Torrey	The Roots of Treason: Ezra Pound and the Secret of St. Elizabeth’s	Ezra Pound (1885–1972), American poet and critic	Finalist	
1983	Fred Kaplan	Thomas Carlyle	Thomas Carlyle (1795–1881), Scottish essayist, historian and philosopher	Finalist	
1984	Joseph Frank	Dostoevsky: The Years of Ordeal, 1850–1859	Fyodor Dostoevsky (1821–1881), Russian novelist	Winner	
1984	Susan Cheever	Home Before Dark	memoir and biography of her father, author John Cheever	Finalist	
1984	Elinor Langer	Josephine Herbst	Josephine Herbst (1892–1969), American writer and journalist	Finalist	
1984	Eudora Welty	One Writer’s Beginnings		Finalist	
1984	Paul Zweig	Walt Whitman: The Making of a Poet	Walt Whitman (1819–1892), American poet, essayist and journalist	Finalist	
1985	Leon Edel	Henry James: A Life	Henry James (1843–1916), American-born British writer and literary critic	Winner	
1985	Leonard Arrington	Brigham Young: American Moses	Brigham Young (1801–1877), Latter Day Saint religious leader	Finalist	
1985	James Lord	Giacometti: A Biography	Alberto Giacometti (1901–1966), Swiss sculptor and painter	Finalist	
1985	Elizabeth Frank	Louise Bogan	Louise Bogan (1897–1970), American poet	Finalist	
1985	Michael Lesy	Visible Light: Four Creative Biographies	photographers Angelo Rizzuto, Bill Burke, John McWilliams, and Andrea Kovacs	Finalist	
1986	Arnold Rampersad	The Life of Langston Hughes, Vol. I: 1902-1941	Langston Hughes (1901–1967), American writer and social activist	Winner	
1986	Joseph Frank	Dostoevsky: The Stir of Liberation, 1860-1865	Fyodor Dostoevsky (1821–1881), Russian novelist	Finalist	
1986	Art Spiegelman	Maus: A Survivor’s Tale	the lives of his parents in Poland during the Holocaust and in the U.S. afterward	Finalist	
1986	Theodore Rosengarten	Tombee: Portrait of a Cotton Planter	Thomas B. Chaplin (1822–1890), American plantation owner and slaveholder	Finalist	
1986	Jonathan Brown	Velázquez: Painter and Courtier	Diego Velázquez (1599–1660), Spanish painter	Finalist	
1987	Donald R. Howard	Chaucer: His Life, His Works, His World	Geoffrey Chaucer (1340s–1400), English poet and author, writer of The Canterbury Tales	Winner	
1987	Annie Dillard	An American Childhood		Finalist	
1987	Prudence Crowther	Don’t Tread on Me: The Selected Letters of S.J. Perelman	S.J. Perelman (1904–1979), American humorist and screenwriter	Finalist	
1987	Paul Taylor	Private Domain		Finalist	
1987	Arthur Miller	Timebends: A Life		Finalist	
1988	Richard Ellmann	Oscar Wilde	Oscar Wilde (1854–1900), Irish poet, playwright, and aesthete	Winner	
1988	Paul Monette	Borrowed Time: An AIDS Memoir		Finalist	
1988	Valerie Eliot	The Letters of T.S. Eliot, 1909-1922	T. S. Eliot (1888–1965), US-born British poet	Finalist	
1988	Paul Jay	The Selected Correspondence of Kenneth Burke and Malcolm Cowley, 1915-1981		Finalist	
1988	Robert Wright	Three Scientists and Their Gods: Looking for Meaning in an Age of Information	American scientists Edward Fredkin, Edward O. Wilson, and Kenneth Boulding	Finalist	
1989	Geoffrey C. Ward	A First-Class Temperament: The Emergence of Franklin Roosevelt	Franklin Roosevelt (1882–1945), 32nd president of the United States, serving from 1933 to 1945	Winner	
1989	Otto Friedrich	Glenn Gould: A Life and Variations	Glenn Gould (1932–1982), Canadian pianist	Finalist	
1989	Bil Gilbert	God Gave Us This Country: Tekamthi and the First American Civil War		Finalist	
1989	Roger Morris	Richard Milhous Nixon: The Rise of an American Politician	Richard Nixon (1913–1994), 37th president of the United States, serving from 1969 to 1974	Finalist	
1989	Tobias Wolff	This Boy’s Life: A Memoir		Finalist	
1990	Robert A. Caro	Means of Ascent: The Years of Lyndon Johnson, Vol. II	Lyndon Johnson (1908–1973), 36th president of the United States, serving from 1963 to 1969	Winner	
1990	Richard Rhodes	A Hole in the World: An American Boyhood		Finalist	
1990	T. H. Watkins	Righteous Pilgrim: The Life and Times of Harold L. Ickes	Harold L. Ickes (1874–1952), American politician	Finalist	
1990	John Espey	Strong Drink, Strong Language		Finalist	
1990	Patricia O'Toole	The Five of Hearts: An Intimate Portrait of Henry Adams and His Friends, 1880-1918	Henry Adams (1838–1918), American historian and Adams political family member	Finalist	
1991	Philip Roth	Patrimony: A True Story		Winner	
1991	Diane Middlebrook	Anne Sexton: A Biography	Anne Sexton (1928–1974), American poet	Finalist	
1991	Art Spiegelman	Maus II		Finalist	
1991	John Cheever	The Journals of John Cheever	John Cheever (1912–1982), American novelist and short story writer	Finalist	
1991	Robert Kanigel	The Man Who Knew Infinity: A Life of the Genius Ramanujan	Srinivasa Ramanujan (1887–1920), Indian mathematician	Finalist	
1992	Carol Brightman	Writing Dangerously: Mary McCarthy and Her World	Mary McCarthy (1912–1989), American writer	Winner	
1992	Walter Isaacson	Kissinger	Henry Kissinger (1923–2023), German-born American politician, diplomat, and geopolitical consultant	Finalist	
1992	Paul Hendrickson	Looking for the Light: The Hidden Life and Art of Marion Post Wolcott	Marion Post Wolcott (1910–1990), American photographer	Finalist	
1992	Jack Beatty	The Rascal King: The Life and Times of James Michael Curley, 1874-1958	James Michael Curley (1874–1958), American politician	Finalist	
1992	David McCullough	Truman	Harry S. Truman (1884–1972), 33rd president of the United States, serving from 1945 to 1953	Finalist	
1993	Edmund White	Genet	Jean Genet (1910–1986), French writer	Winner	
1993	James Merrill	A Different Person		Finalist	
1993	David Levering Lewis	W. E. B. Du Bois: Biography of a Race, 1868–1919	W. E. B. Du Bois (1868–1963), American writer and civil rights activist	Finalist	
1993	Alice Kaplan	French Lessons		Finalist	
1993	James Miller	The Passion of Michel Foucault	Michel Foucault (1926–1984), French philosopher	Finalist	
1994	Mikal Gilmore	Shot in the Heart		Winner	
1994	Brenda Maddox	D.H. Lawrence: The Story of a Marriage	D. H. Lawrence (1885–1930), English writer and poet	Finalist	
1994	Edward O. Wilson	Naturalist	autobiography of Edward O. Wilson (1929–2021), American biologist and entomologist	Finalist	
1994	Julia Frey	Toulouse-Lautrec	Henri de Toulouse-Lautrec (1864–1901), French painter and illustrator	Finalist	
1994	Neal Gabler	Winchell: Gossip, Power and the Culture of Celebrity	Walter Winchell (1897–1972), American gossip columnist	Finalist	
1995	Robert Polito	Savage Art: A Biography of Jim Thompson	Jim Thompson (1906–1977), American writer	Winner	
1995	Robert Richardson Jr.	Emerson: The Mind on Fire	Ralph Waldo Emerson (1803–1882), American philosopher, essayist, and poet	Finalist	
1995	John Hockenberry	Moving Violations: War Zones, Wheelchairs and Declarations of Independence		Finalist	
1995	Mary Karr	The Liars’ Club		Finalist	
1995	David S. Reynolds	Walt Whitman’s America	Walt Whitman (1819–1892), American poet, essayist and journalist	Finalist	
1996	Frank McCourt	Angela's Ashes		Winner	
1996	Jan Swafford	Charles Ives: A Life in Music	Charles Ives (1874–1954), American modernist composer	Finalist	
1996	David Hajdu	Lush Life: A Biography of Billy Strayhorn	Billy Strayhorn (1915–1967), American musician, composer, lyricist and arranger	Finalist	
1996	Peter Conn	Pearl S. Buck: A Cultural Biography	Pearl S. Buck (1892–1973), American writer	Finalist	
1996	Alan Shapiro	The Last Happy Occasion		Finalist	
1997	James Tobin	Ernie Pyle's War: America's Eyewitness to World War II	Ernie Pyle (1900–1945), American journalist and war correspondent	Winner	
1997	Joseph Ellis	American Sphinx: The Character of Thomas Jefferson	Thomas Jefferson (1743–1826), 3rd president of the United States, serving from 1801 to 1809	Finalist	
1997	Hermione Lee	Virginia Woolf	Virginia Woolf (1882– 1941), English modernist writer	Finalist	
1997	Doris Lessing	Walking in the Shade		Finalist	
1998	Sylvia Nasar	A Beautiful Mind	John Nash (1928–2015), American mathematician	Winner	
1998	Amanda Vaill	Everybody Was So Young: Gerald and Sara Murphy: A Lost Generation Love Story		Finalist	
1998	David Remnick	King of the World: Muhammad Ali and the Rise of an American Hero	Muhammad Ali (1942–2016), American boxer, philanthropist and activist	Finalist	
1998	Homer H. Hickman Jr.	Rocket Boys: A Memoir		Finalist	
1998	Ron Chernow	Titan: The Life of John D. Rockefeller, Sr.	John D. Rockefeller (1839–1937), American business magnate and philanthropist	Finalist	
1999	Henry Wiencek	The Hairstons: An American Family in Black and White		Winner	
1999	Richard Holmes	Coleridge: Vol. II: Darker Reflections	Samuel Taylor Coleridge (1772–1834), English poet	Finalist	
1999	Jean Strouse	Morgan: American Financier	J. P. Morgan (1837–1913), American businessman	Finalist	
1999	Judith Thurman	Secrets of the Flesh: A Life of Colette	Colette (1873–1954), French writeír	Finalist	
1999	Susan E. Tifft and Alex S. Jones	The Trust: The Private and Powerful Family Behind the New York Times		Finalist	
2000	Herbert P. Bix	Hirohito and the Making of Modern Japan	Hirohito (1901–1989), Emperor of Japan from 1926 to 1989	Winner	
2000	Viktor Klemperer	I Will Bear Witness: A Diary of the Nazi Years, 1942-1945		Finalist	
2000	Jean-Yves Tadie	Marcel Proust: A Life	Marcel Proust (1871–1922), French novelist, critic and essayist	Finalist	
2000	David Nasaw	The Chief: The Life of William Randolph Hearst	William Randolph Hearst (1863–1951), American newspaper publisher	Finalist	
2000	Robin Marantz Henig	The Monk in the Garden: The Lost and Found Genius of Gregor Mendel, the Father of Genetics	Gregor Mendel (1822–1884), Silesian scientist and Augustinian friar	Finalist	
2001	Adam Sisman	Boswell's Presumptuous Task: The Making of the Life of Dr. Johnson	James Boswell (1740–1795), Scottish lawyer, diarist, and author	Winner	
2001	Paula Fox	Borrowed Finery: A Memoir		Finalist	
2001	Katherine Clark	Milking the Moon: A Southerner’s Story of Life on This Planet		Finalist	
2001	David Hajdu	Positively 4th Street: The Lives and Times of Joan Baez, Bob Dylan, Mimi Baez Farina and Richard Farina		Finalist	
2001	Barry Werth	The Scarlet Professor: Newton Arvin: A Literary Life Shattered by Scandal	Newton Arvin (1900–1963), American literary critic and academic	Finalist	
2002	Janet Browne	Charles Darwin: The Power of Place, Vol. II	Charles Darwin (1809–1882), English naturalist and biologist	Winner	
2002	Edmund S. Morgan	Benjamin Franklin	Benjamin Franklin (1706–1790), American polymath and a Founding Father of the United States	Finalist	
2002	Robert A. Caro	Master of the Senate: The Years of Lyndon Johnson	Lyndon Johnson (1908–1973), 36th president of the United States, serving from 1963 to 1969	Finalist	
2002	Elizabeth Gilbert	The Last American Man	Eustace Conway (born 1961), American naturalist	Finalist	
2002	Mark Zwonitzer with Charles Hirshberg	Will You Miss Me When I’m Gone? The Carter Family and Their Legacy in American Music	The Carter Family, traditional American folk music group (1927–1956)	Finalist	
2003	William Taubman	Khrushchev: The Man and His Era	Nikita Khrushchev (1894–1971), First Secretary of the Communist Party of the Soviet Union	Winner	
2003	Blake Bailey	A Tragic Honesty: The Life and Work of Richard Yates	Richard Yates (1926–1992), American novelist	Finalist	
2003	George Marsden	Jonathan Edwards: A Life	Jonathan Edwards (1703–1758), American preacher and theologian	Finalist	
2003	Carol Loeb Shloss	Lucia Joyce: To Dance in the Wake	Lucia Joyce (1907–1982), Professional dancer and the daughter of James Joyce and Nora Barnacle	Finalist	
2003	Paul Elie	The Life You Save May Be Your Own: An American Pilgrimage		Finalist	
2004	Mark Stevens and Annalyn Swan	de Kooning: An American Master	Willem de Kooning, Dutch-American abstract expressionist artist (1904– 1997)	Winner	
2004	Ron Chernow	Alexander Hamilton	Alexander Hamilton, American founding father and statesman (1757–1804)	Finalist	
2004	Bob Dylan	Chronicles: Vol. 1	Bob Dylan (born 1941), American singer-songwriter, author and artist	Finalist	
2004	John Guy	Queen of Scots: The True Life of Mary Stuart	Mary, Queen of Scots (1542–1587), Queen of Scotland from 1542 to 1567	Finalist	
2004	Stephen Greenblatt	Will in the World: How Shakespeare Became Shakespeare	William Shakespeare, English poet, playwright, and actor (1564–1616)	Finalist	
2005	Kai Bird and Martin J. Sherwin	American Prometheus: The Triumph and Tragedy of J. Robert Oppenheimer	J. Robert Oppenheimer (1904–1967), American theoretical physicist, known as "father of the atomic bomb"	Winner	
2005	Carolyn Burke	Lee Miller: A Life	Lee Miller (1907–1977), American photographer	Finalist	
2005	Jonathan Coe	Like a Fiery Elephant: The Story of B.S. Johnson	B. S. Johnson (1933–1973), English novelist, poet and critic	Finalist	
2005	Ron Powers	Mark Twain: A Life	Mark Twain (1835–1910), American author and humorist	Finalist	
2005	Doris Kearns Goodwin	Team of Rivals: The Political Genius of Abraham Lincoln	Abraham Lincoln (1809–1865), 16th president of the United States, serving from 1861 to 1865	Finalist	
2006	Julie Phillips	James Tiptree, Jr.: The Double Life of Alice B. Sheldon	James Tiptree Jr. (1915–1987), American writer	Winner	
2006	Jason Roberts	A Sense of the World: How a Blind Man Became History’s Greatest Traveler	James Holman (1786–1857), British adventurer	Finalist	
2006	Taylor Branch	At Canaan’s Edge: America in the King Years, 1965-1968		Finalist	
2006	Frederick Brown	Flaubert: A Biography	Gustave Flaubert (1821–1880), French novelist	Finalist	
2006	Debby Applegate	The Most Famous Man in America: The Biography of Henry Ward Beecher	Henry Ward Beecher (1813–1887), American clergyman and abolitionist	Finalist	
2007	Tim Jeal	Stanley: The Impossible Life of Africa's Greatest Explorer	Henry Morton Stanley (1841–1904), Welsh-American explorer, journalist and politician	Winner	
2007	John Richardson	A Life of Picasso: The Triumphant Years, 1917–1932	Pablo Picasso (1881–1973), Spanish painter and sculptor, known for co-founding the Cubist movement	Finalist	
2007	Hermione Lee	Edith Wharton	Edith Wharton (1862 –1937), American novelist, short story writer, designer	Finalist	
2007	Arnold Rampersad	Ralph Ellison	Ralph Ellison (1913–1994), American novelist, literary critic, scholar and writer	Finalist	
2007	Claire Tomalin	Thomas Hardy: the Time-Torn Man	Thomas Hardy (1840–1928), English novelist and poet	Finalist	
2008	Patrick French	The World is What it is: The Authorized Biography of V.S. Naipaul	V. S. Naipaul (1932–2018), British novelist and non-fiction writer	Winner	
2008	Paul J. Giddings	Ida, A Sword Among Lions: Ida B. Wells and the Campaign Against Lynching	Ida B. Wells, African-American civil rights activist (1862–1931)	Finalist	
2008	Steve Coll	The Bin Ladens: An Arabian Family in an American Century		Finalist	
2008	Annette Gordon-Reed	The Hemingses of Monticello: An American Family		Finalist	
2008	Brenda Wineapple	White Heat: The Friendship of Emily Dickinson & Thomas Wentworth Higginson		Finalist	
2009	Blake Bailey	Cheever: A Life	John Cheever (1912–1982), American novelist and short story writer	Winner	
2009	Stanislao G. Pugliese	Bitter Spring: A Life of Ignazio Silone	Ignazio Silone (1900–1978), Italian political leader and writer, known for his anti-Fascist novels during World War II	Finalist	
2009	Brad Gooch	Flannery: A Life of Flannery O'Connor	Flannery O'Connor (1925–1964), American writer	Finalist	
2009	Martha A. Sandweiss	Passing Strange: A Gilded Age Tale of Love and Deception Across the Color Line		Finalist	
2009	Benjamin Moser	Why This World: A Biography of Clarice Lispector	Clarice Lispector (1920–1977), Brazilian novelist and short story writer	Finalist	
2010	Sarah Bakewell	How To Live, Or A Life Of Montaigne	Michel de Montaigne (1533–1592), French-Occitan author, humanistic philosopher, and statesman	Winner	
2010	Yunte Huang	Charlie Chan: The Untold Story of the Honorable Detective And His Rendezvous With American History	Charlie Chan, Fictional detective	Finalist	
2010	Tom Segev	Simon Wiesenthal: The Lives And Legends	Simon Wiesenthal (1908–2005), Jewish Austrian Holocaust survivor and Nazi hunter	Finalist	
2010	Thomas Powers	The Killing Of Crazy Horse		Finalist	
2010	Selina Hastings	The Secret Lives Of Somerset Maugham: A Biography	W. Somerset Maugham (1874–1965), English playwright and writer	Finalist	
2011	John Lewis Gaddis	George F. Kennan: An American Life	George F. Kennan (1904–2005), American advisor, diplomat, political scientist and historian	Winner	
2011	Ezra F. Vogel	Deng Xiaoping and the Transformation of China	Deng Xiaoping (1904–1997), Chinese politician and leader from 1978 to 1989	Finalist	
2011	Paul Hendrickson	Hemingway's Boat: Everything He Loved in Life, and Lost, 1934–1961	Ernest Hemingway (1899–1961), American author and journalist	Finalist	
2011	Mary Gabriel	Love and Capital: Karl and Jenny Marx and the Birth of the Revolution	Karl Marx (1818–1883), German philosopher	Finalist	
2011	Manning Marable	Malcolm X: A Life of Reinvention	Malcolm X (1925–1965), African-American human rights activist	Finalist	
2012	Robert A. Caro	The Passage of Power: The Years of Lyndon Johnson	Lyndon Johnson (1908–1973), 36th president of the United States, serving from 1963 to 1969	Winner	
2012	Lisa Cohen	All We Know: Three Lives		Finalist	
2012	Michael Gorra	Portrait of a Novel: Henry James and the Making of an American Masterpiece	Henry James (1843–1916), American-born British writer and literary critic	Finalist	
2012	Lisa Jarnot	Robert Duncan, The Ambassador from Venus: A Biography	Robert Duncan (1919–1988), American poet	Finalist	
2012	Tom Reiss	The Black Count: Glory, Revolution, Betrayal, and the Real Count of Monte Cristo	Thomas-Alexandre Dumas (1762–1806), French Army officer served as the inspiration for the 1844 book The Count of Monte Cristo	Finalist	
2013	Leo Damrosch	Jonathan Swift: His Life and His World	Jonathan Swift (1667–1745), Anglo-Irish satirist, essayist, and cleric	Winner	
2013	John Eliot Gardiner	Bach: Music in the Castle of Heaven	Johann Sebastian Bach (1685–1750), German composer	Finalist	
2013	Mark Thompson	Birth Certificate: The Story of Danilo Kis	Danilo Kis (1935–1989), Yugoslav writer	Finalist	
2013	Linda Leavell	Holding On Upside Down: The Life and Work of Marianne Moore	Marianne Moore (1887–1972), American poet	Finalist	
2013	Scott Anderson	Lawrence in Arabia: War, Deceit, Imperial Folly and the Making of the Modern Middle East		Finalist	
2014	John Lahr	Tennessee Williams: Mad Pilgrimage of the Flesh	Tennessee Williams (1911–1983), American playwright	Winner	
2014	Ian S. MacNiven	Literchoor Is My Beat: A Life of James Laughlin, Publisher of New Directions	James Laughlin (1914–1997), American publisher and poet	Finalist	
2014	S. C. Gwynne	Rebel Yell: The Violence, Passion and Redemption of Stonewall Jackson	Stonewall Jackson (1824–1863), Confederate States Army general	Finalist	
2014	Miriam Pawel	The Crusades of Cesar Chavez: A Biography	Cesar Chavez (1927–1993), American farm worker, labor leader, and civil rights activist	Finalist	
2014	Ezra Greenspan	William Wells Brown: An African American Life	William Wells Brown (1814–1884), African-American abolitionist lecturer, novelist, playwright, and historian	Finalist	
2015	Charlotte Gordon	Romantic Outlaws: The Extraordinary Lives of Mary Wollstonecraft and Her Daughter Mary Shelley	Mary Wollstonecraft (1759–1797), English writer and intellectual and Mary Shelley (1797–1851), English writer	Winner	
2015	T. J. Stiles	Custer's Trials: A Life on the Frontier of a New America	George Armstrong Custer (1839–1876), American general	Finalist	
2015	Karin Wieland and Shelly Frisch	Dietrich and Riefenstahl: Hollywood, Berlin, and a Century in Two Lives		Finalist	
2015	Terry Alford	Fortune’s Fool: The Life of John Wilkes Booth	John Wilkes Booth (1838–1865), American stage actor and assassin of Abraham Lincoln	Finalist	
2015	Rosemary Sullivan	Stalin's Daughter: The Extraordinary and Tumultuous Life of Svetlana Alliluyeva	Svetlana Alliluyeva (1926 –2011), Youngest child of Josef Stalin who defected to the U.S. in 1967	Finalist	
2016	Ruth Franklin	Shirley Jackson: A Rather Haunted Life	Shirley Jackson (1916–1965), American writer	Winner	
2016	Joe Jackson	Black Elk: The Life of an American Visionary	Black Elk (1863–1950), Native American religious figure	Finalist	
2016	Frances Wilson	Guilty Thing: A Life of Thomas De Quincey	Thomas De Quincey (1785–1859), English essayist	Finalist	
2016	Michael Tisserand	Krazy: George Herriman, a Life in Black and White	George Herriman (1880–1944), American cartoonist (1880–1944)	Finalist	
2016	Nigel Cliff	Moscow Nights: The Van Cliburn Story	Van Cliburn (1934–February 27, 2013), American pianist	Finalist	
2017	Caroline Fraser	Prairie Fires: The American Dreams of Laura Ingalls Wilder	Laura Ingalls Wilder (1867–1957), American writer, teacher, and journalist	Winner	
2017	William Taubman	Gorbachev: His Life and Times	Mikhail Gorbachev (born 1931), Leader of the Soviet Union from 1985 to 1991	Finalist	
2017	Ken Whyte	Hoover: An Extraordinary Life in Extraordinary Times	Herbert Hoover (1874–1964), 31st president of the United States, serving from 1929 to 1933	Finalist	
2017	Edmund Gordon	The Invention of Angela Carter: A Biography	Angela Carter (1940–1992), English novelist	Finalist	
2017	Howard Markel	The Kelloggs: The Battling Brothers of Battle Creek		Finalist	
2018	Christopher Bonanos	Flash: The Making of Weegee the Famous	Arthur Fellig, also known as Weegee, (1899–1968), American photographer and photojournalist	Winner	
2018	Yunte Huang	Inseparable: The Original Siamese Twins and Their Rendezvous with American History	Chang and Eng Bunker, (1811–1874) Siamese-American cojoined twin brothers	Finalist	
2018	Craig Brown	Ma'am Darling: Ninety-Nine Glimpses of Princess Margaret	Princess Margaret, Countess of Snowdon (1930–2002), Daughter of King George VI	Finalist	
2018	Jane Leavy	The Big Fella: Babe Ruth and the World He Created	Babe Ruth (1895–1948), American baseball player	Finalist	
2018	Mark Lamster	The Man in the Glass House: Philip Johnson, Architect of the Modern Century	Philip Johnson (1906–2005), American architect	Finalist	
2019	Josh Levin	The Queen: The Forgotten Life Behind an American Myth	Linda Taylor (1926–2002), committed extensive welfare fraud and became known as the "welfare queen"	Winner	
2019	Sonia Purnell	A Woman of No Importance: The Untold Story of the American Spy Who Helped Win World War II	Virginia Hall (1906–1982), American spy	Finalist	
2019	Charles King	Gods of the Upper Air: How A Circle of Renegade Anthropologists Reinvented Race, Sex, and Gender in the Twentieth Century		Finalist	
2019	Lucasta Miller	L.E.L.: The Lost Life and Scandalous Death of Letitia Elizabeth Landon, the Celebrated Female Byron	Letitia Elizabeth Landon (1802–1838), British poet and novelist	Finalist	
2019	George Packer	Our Man: Richard Holbrooke and the End of the American Century	Richard Holbrooke (1941–2010), American diplomat and author	Finalist	
2020	Amy Stanley	Stranger in the Shogun's City: A Japanese Woman and Her World		Winner	
2020	Heather Clark	Red Comet: The Short Life and Blazing Art of Sylvia Plath	Sylvia Plath, American poet, novelist and short story writer (1932–1963)	Finalist	
2020	Les Payne and Tamara Payne	The Dead Are Arising: The Life of Malcolm X	Malcolm X (1925–1965), African-American human rights activist	Finalist	
2020	Maggie Doherty	The Equivalents: A Story of Art, Female Friendship, and Liberation in the 1960s		Finalist	
2020	Zachary D. Carter	The Price of Peace: Money, Democracy, and the Life of John Maynard Keynes	John Maynard Keynes (1883–1946), English economist	Finalist	
2021	Rebecca Donner	All the Frequent Troubles of Our Days: The True Story of the American Woman at the Heart of the German Resistance to Hitler	Mildred Harnack (1902–1943), American literary historian, author, and member of the German resistance against the Nazi regime	Winner	
2021	Susan Bernofsky	Clairvoyant of the Small: The Life of Robert Walser	Robert Walser (1878–1956), Swiss-German modernist author	Finalist	
2021	Alexander Nemerov	Fierce Poise: Helen Frankenthaler and 1950s New York	Helen Frankenthaler (1928–2011), American abstract expressionist painter	Finalist	
2021	Mark Harris	Mike Nichols: A Life	Mike Nichols (1931–2014), American television director, writer, producer and comedian	Finalist	
2021	Keisha N. Blain	Until I Am Free: Fannie Lou Hamer’s Enduring Message to America	Fannie Lou Hamer (1917–1977), American civil rights activist	Finalist	
2022	Beverly Gage	G-Man: J. Edgar Hoover and the Making of the American Century	J. Edgar Hoover (1895–1972), American, first Director of the Federal Bureau of Investigation	Winner	
2022	Kerri K. Greenidge	The Grimkes: The Legacy of Slavery in an American Family		Finalist	
2022	Jennifer Homans	Mr. B: George Balanchine's 20th Century	George Balanchine (1904–1983), Georgian-American ballet choreographer	Finalist	
2022	Clare Mac Cumhaill and Rachael Wiseman	Metaphysical Animals: How Four Women Brought Philosophy Back to Life		Finalist	
2022	Aaron Sachs	Up From the Depths: Herman Melville, Louis Mumford, and Rediscovery in Dark Times		Finalist	
2023	Jonny Steinberg	Winnie and Nelson: Portrait of a Marriage		Winner	
2023	Jonathan Eig	King: A Life	Martin Luther King Jr. (1929–1968), African-American civil rights leader	Finalist	
2023	Gregg Hecimovich	The Life and Times of Hannah Crafts: The True Story of the Bondwoman's Narrative	Hannah Crafts, African-American writer	Finalist	
2023	Yunte Huang	Daughter of the Dragon: Anna May Wong’s Rendezvous with American History	Anna May Wong (1905–1961), Chinese-American actress	Finalist	
2023	Rachel Shteir	Betty Friedan: Magnificent Disruptor	Betty Friedan (1921–2006), American feminist writer and activist	Finalist	
2024	Cynthia Carr	Candy Darling: Dreamer, Icon, Superstar	Candy Darling (1944–1974), American actress	Winner	
2024	Jane Kamensky	Candida Royalle and the Sexual Revolution: A History from Below	Candida Royalle (1950–2015), American pornographic filmmaker	Finalist	
2024	Jean Strouse	Family Romance: John Singer Sargent and the Wertheimers	John Singer Sargent (1856–1925), American painter	Finalist	
2024	Tiya Miles	Night Flyer: Harriet Tubman and the Faith Dreams of a Free People	Harriet Tubman (1822–1913), African-American abolitionist	Finalist	
2024	Amy Reading	The World She Edited: Katharine S. White at The New Yorker	Katharine S. White (1892–1977), American writer and editor	Finalist	
2025	Alex Green	A Perfect Turmoil: Walter E. Fernald and the Struggle to Care for America’s Disabled	Dr. Walter E. Fernald (1859–1924), Psychiatrist and educator on developmental disabilities	Winner	
2025	Mayukh Sen	Love, Queenie: Merle Oberon, Hollywood’s First South Asian Star	Merle Oberon (1911–1979, British actress of Anglo-Indian origin, leading lady during the Golden Age of Hollywood	Finalists	
2025	Amanda Vail	Pride and Pleasure: The Schuyler Sisters in an Age of Revolution	Angelica Schuyler Church (1756 – 1814) and Elizabeth Schuyler Hamilton (1757 –1854), American sisters and socialites during the American Revolution	Finalists	
2025	Ashley D. Farmer	Queen Mother: Black Nationalism, Reparations, and the Untold Story of Audley Moore	Audley Moore (1898 – 1997), American civil rights leader and a black nationalist	Finalists	
2025	Carla Kaplan	Troublemaker: The Fierce, Unruly Life of Jessica Mitford	Jessica Mitford (1917 – 1996), English-American author and communist activist	Finalists	
