= NAACP Image Award for Outstanding Literary Work – Biography/Autobiography =

Biography author award from the NAACP

This article lists the winners and nominees for the NAACP Image Award for Outstanding Literary Work, Biography/Autobiography.

== Winners and finalists ==
Award winners and nominees
Year	Author(s)	Title	Result	Ref.
2007	Chris Gardner	The Pursuit of Happyness	Winner	
2007	Christopher John Farley	Before the Legend: The Rise of Bob Marley	Nominee	
2007	Mike Freeman	Jim Brown: The Fierce Life of an American Hero	Nominee	
2007	Rain Pryor	Jokes My Father Never Taught Me	Nominee	
2007	Wangarĩ Maathai	Unbowed	Nominee	
2008	David Mendell	Obama: From Promise to Power	Winner	
2008	Eddie Levert, Sr., Gerald Levert, and Lyah Leflore	I Got Your Back: A Father and Son Keep it Real About Love, Fatherhood, Family, and Friendship	Nominee	
2008	Clarence Thomas	My Grandfather's Son	Nominee	
2008	Tommie Smith and David Steele	Silent Gesture: The Autobiography of Tommie Smith	Nominee	
2008	Victoria Rowell	The Women Who Raised Me: A Memoir	Nominee	
2009	Diahann Carroll	The Legs Are the Last to Go	Winner	
2010	Deborah Willis and Emily Bernard	Michelle Obama: The First Lady In Photographs	Winner	
2010	Cornel West	Brother West: Living and Loving Out Loud	Nominee	
2010	Terry Teachout	POPS: A Life of Louis	Nominee	
2010	LeBron James and Buzz Bissinger	Shooting Stars	Nominee	
2010	James Gavin	Stormy Weather: The Life of Lena Horne	Nominee	
2011	Ray Charles Robinson, Jr.	You Don’t Know Me: Reflections of My Father, Ray Charles	Winner	
2012	Harry Belafonte and Michael Shnayerson	My Song: A Memoir	Winner	
2012	Condoleezza Rice	No Higher Honor: A Memoir of My Years in Washington	Nominee	
2012	Dave Zirin and John Wesley Carlos	The John Carlos Story: The Sports Moment That Changed the World	Nominee	
2012	Janny Scott	A Singular Woman: The Untold Story of Barack Obama’s Mother	Nominee	
2012	Manning Marable	Malcolm X: A Life Of Reinvention	Nominee	
2013	John Lewis	Across That Bridge: Life Lessons and a Vision for Change	Winner	
2013	Kofi Annan	Interventions: A Life in War and Peace	Nominee	
2013	RJ Smith	The One: The Life and Music of James Brown	Nominee	
2013	Tom Reiss	The Black Count: Glory, Revolution, Betrayal, and the Real Count of Monte Cristo	Nominee	
2013	Will Allen	The Good Food Revolution: Growing Healthy Food, People, and Communities	Nominee	
2014	Jeanne Theoharis	The Rebellious Life of Mrs. Rosa Parks	Winner	
2014	Maya Angelou	Mom & Me & Mom	Nominee	
2014	M. K. Asante	Buck: A Memoir	Nominee	
2014	Stanley Crouch	Kansas City Lightning: The Rise And Times Of Charlie Parker	Nominee	
2014	Terry Teachout	Duke: A Life of Duke Ellington	Nominee	
2015	David Chanoff and Louis Sullivan	Breaking Ground: My Life in Medicine	Winner	
2015	Misty Copeland	Life in Motion: An Unlikely Ballerina	Nominee	
2015	Jessye Norman	Stand Up Straight and Sing!	Nominee	
2015	Marion Barry Jr. and Omar Tyree	Mayor For Life: The Incredible Story of Marion Barry Jr.	Nominee	
2015	Rosie Perez	Handbook For An Unpredictable Life: How I Survived Sister Renata And My Crazy Mother, And Still Came Out Smiling (With Great Hair)	Nominee	
2016	Ta-Nehisi Coates	Between the World And Me	Winner	
2016	Arthur Browne	One Righteous Man: Samuel Battle and the Shattering of the Color Line in New York	Nominee	
2016	Jan Gaye and David Ritz	After the Dance: My Life With Marvin Gaye	Nominee	
2016	Reggie Love	Power Forward: My Presidential Education	Nominee	
2016	Shonda Rhimes	Year of Yes: How to Dance It Out, Stand In the Sun and Be Your Own Person	Nominee	
2017	Trevor Noah	Born a Crime: Stories from a South African Childhood	Winner	
2017	Taraji P. Henson	Around the Way Girl: A Memoir	Nominee	
2017	Nathaniel Jones	Answering the Call: An Autobiography of the Modern Struggle to End Racial Discrimination in America	Nominee	
2017	Mychal Denzel Smith	Invisible Man, Got the Whole World Watching, A Young Black Man's Education	Nominee	
2017	Herb Powell and Maurice White	My Life with Earth, Wind & Fire	Nominee	
2018	Susan Burton and Cari Lynn	Becoming Ms. Burton: From Prison to Recovery to Leading the Fight for Incarcerated Women	Winner	
2018	Jonathan Eig	Ali: A Life	Nominee	
2018	Lawrence P. Jackson	Chester B. Himes	Nominee	
2018	Peter Baker	Obama: The Call of History	Nominee	
2018	Gabrielle Union	We're Going to Need More Wine	Nominee	
2019	Michelle Obama	Becoming	Winner	
2019	Franchesca Ramsey	Well, That Escalated Quickly: Memoirs and Mistakes of an Accidental Activist	Nominee	
2019	Jeffrey C. Stewart	The New Negro: The Life of Alain Locke	Nominee	
2019	Nelson Mandela	The Prison Letters of Nelson Mandela	Nominee	
2019	Zora Neale Hurston and Deborah G. Plant	Barracoon: The Story of the Last "Black Cargo"	Nominee	
2020	Elaine Welteroth	More Than Enough: Claiming Space for Who You Are (No Matter What They Say)	Winner	
2020	Cyntoia Brown-Long	Free Cyntoia: My Search for Redemption in the American Prison System	Nominee	
2020	Prince Rogers Nelson	The Beautiful Ones	Nominee	
2020	Prince Rogers Nelson and Randee St. Nicholas	My Name Is Prince	Nominee	
2020	Valerie Jarrett	Finding My Voice: My Journey to the West Wing and the Path Forward	Nominee	
2021	Les Payne and Tamara Payne	The Dead Are Arising: The Life of Malcolm X	Winner	
2021	Arshay Cooper	A Most Beautiful Thing: The True Story of America’s First All-Black High School Rowing Team	Nominee	
2021	Barack Obama	A Promised Land	Nominee	
2021	Deborah Draper	Olympic Pride, American Prejudice	Nominee	
2021	Willie O’Ree	Willie: The Game-Changing Story of the NHL’s First Black Player	Nominee	
2022	Will Smith	Will	Winner	
2022	Cicely Tyson	Just As I Am	Nominee	
2022	Tarana Burke	Unbound: My Story of Liberation and the Birth of the Me Too Movement	Nominee	
2022	Billy Porter	Unprotected: A Memoir	Nominee	
2022	Keisha Blain	Until I Am Free	Nominee	
2023	Michael K. Williams	Scenes from My Life: A Memoir	Winner	
2023	Cynt Marshall	You’ve Been Chosen: Thriving Through the Unexpected	Nominee	
2023	Jenifer Lewis	Walking in My Joy: In These Streets	Nominee	
2023	Michelle Obama	The Light We Carry: Overcoming in Uncertain Times	Nominee	
2023	Raphael G. Warnock	A Way Out of No Way: A Memoir of Truth, Transformation, and the New American Story	Nominee	
2024	Tanisha C. Ford	Our Secret Society: Mollie Moon and the Glamour, Money, and Power Behind the Civil Rights Movement	Winner	
2024	Maya Moore Irons	Love and Justice: A Story of Triumph on Two Different Courts	Nominee	
2024	Rich Paul	Lucky Me: A Memoir of Changing the Odds	Nominee	
2024	Nicole Walters	Nothing Is Missing	Nominee	
2024	Stephen A. Smith	Straight Shooter: A Memoir of Second Chances and First Takes	Nominee	
2025	JoyAnn Reid	Medgar and Myrlie: Medgar Evers and the Love Story That Awakened America	Winner	
2025	Whoopi Goldberg	Bits and Pieces: My Mother, My Brother, and Me	Nominee	
2025	Cheslie Kryst and April Simpkins	By the Time You Read This: The Space Between Cheslie’s Smile and Mental Illness ― Her Story in Her Own Words	Nominee	
2025	Tasha Cobbs Leonard, Sarah Jakes Roberts (Foreword)	Do It Anyway: Don’t Give Up Before It Gets Good	Nominee	
2025	Ketanji Brown Jackson	Lovely One	Nominee	
2026	Michelle Obama	The Look	Winner	
2026	Kamala Harris	107 Days	Nominee	
2026	Dana A. Williams	Toni at Random	Nominee	
2026	Lionel Richie	Truly	Nominee	
2026	Dawn Staley	Uncommon Favor: Basketball, North Philly, My Mother, and the Life Lessons I Learned from All Three	Nominee	
