= Dana Williams =

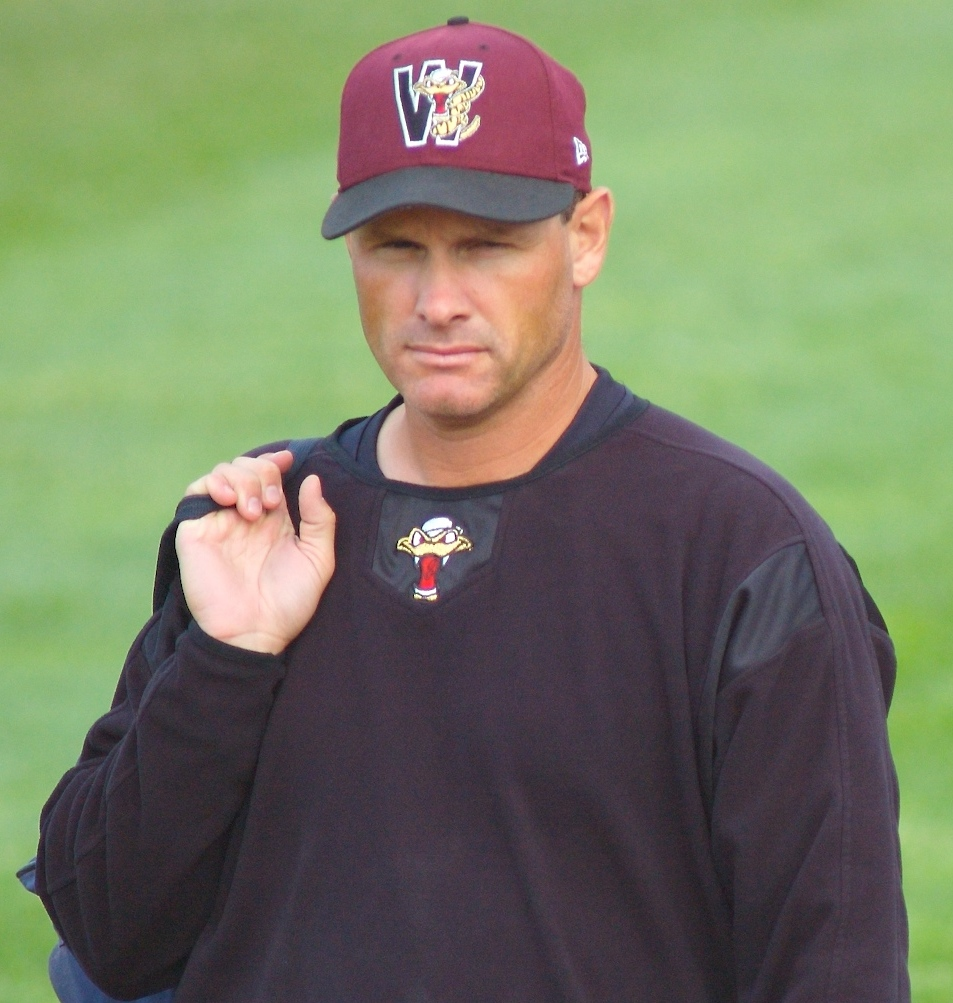
Dana Williams, hitting coach for the Wisconsin Timber Rattlers, in Lansing, Michigan in 2007

Dana Williams may refer to:

- Dana Williams (baseball) (born 1963), American baseball player
- Dana Williams (singer), American singer-songwriter, guitarist, and poet
- Dana A. Williams, scholar of African American literature and university administrator
