= Invisible Man, Got the Whole World Watching (book) =

2016 memoir by Mychal Denzel Smith

- Author: Mychal Denzel Smith
- Language: English
- Genre: Memoir
- Published: 2016
- Publisher: Nation Books
- Publication place: United States

Invisible Man, Got the Whole World Watching: A Young Black Man’s Education is a 2016 memoir written by Mychal Denzel Smith.

Kirkus Reviews wrote "Realizing that he has more questions than answers, Smith cautiously sketches a useful blueprint for radical and intersectional politics in a country where a black child can grow up to be president but where living while black is still dangerous."

KQED said "Every American should read this book. It provides hope that we can survive the violent growing pains of a nasty, brutal, adolescent America."

In The New York Times, Walton Muyumba reviewed the book as "ambitious, ardent and timely."

Melissa Harris-Perry described the book as "affirming, necessary, even delightful, despite its brutality and angst" and BuzzFeed called it a "superbly thoughtful memoir."

The book's title references a lyric by Mos Def.
