= Anna Whitelock =

British historian and academic

Anna Whitelock FRHistS
- Born: Liverpool

Academic background
- Education: Corpus Christi College, Cambridge

Academic work
- Discipline: Historian
- Sub-discipline: Tudor period; Mary Tudor; Elizabeth I
- Institutions: Royal Holloway, University of London; City, University of London

Anna Whitelock is a British historian and academic, specialising in the history of monarchy. She is Professor of the History of Monarchy at City, University of London and Director of the Centre for the Study of Modern Monarchy.

== Academic career ==
Whitelock undertook a Master of Philosophy (MPhil) degree in historical studies at the Faculty of History, University of Cambridge, graduating in 2004: her master's thesis was titled "Henry VIII's ecclesiastical patronage". She remained to undertake a Doctor of Philosophy (PhD) degree from Corpus Christi College, Cambridge, in 2004 under the supervision of Dr David Starkey. Her PhD degree was awarded in 2004 for a doctoral thesis titled "In opposition and in government: the households and affinities of Mary Tudor 1516–1558".

She is Professor in the History of Monarchy at City, University of London, having previously taught at Royal Holloway, University of London.

Whitelock is an elected Fellow of the Royal Historical Society (FRHistS). She won the PEN Weld Award for Biography.

== Selected works ==
- Whitelock, Anna (2010). Mary Tudor: England's First Queen. London: Bloomsbury. ISBN 978-1408800782. OCLC 759872962
- Hunt, Alice; Whitelock, Anna, eds. (2010). Tudor Queenship: The Reigns of Mary and Elizabeth. New York: Palgrave Macmillan. ISBN 978-0230618237.
- Whitelock, Anna (2014). Elizabeth's Bedfellows: an Intimate History of the Queen's Court. London: Bloomsbury. ISBN 978-1408833643. OCLC 1004469938
- Whitelock, Anna (2025). The Sun Rising: James I and the Dawn of Global Britain. Bloomsbury; Viking.
