= Stranger in the Shogun's City =

Biographical book

Stranger in the Shogun's City: A Japanese Woman and Her World is a biographical book by Amy Stanley which was published on July 14, 2020 by Charles Scribner's Sons.

== Summary ==
Stranger in the Shogun’s City is a biographical book about the life of an upper class woman named Tsuneno at the end of the Edo Period of Japan. Stanley tracks Tsuneno's life and travels through Japan, discussing how Tsuneno's life intersected with the changing culture of the time. The novel follows Tsuneno as she obeys and defies gender expectations through various marriages and divorces, eventually leaving her family to start a new life in the city of Edo. The book uses a feminist historical framework of analysis, and a narrative style to appeal to a nonspecialist audience.

== Historical Contributions ==
The book has made contributions to the fields of Women’s History and Japanese History through its use of primary sources from a woman not in the public eye. To tell the story of Tsuneno, Stanley uses temple records, personal letters, and Tsuneno's personal writings. Stanley’s use of archival research and archived family history allows the book to explore elements of women’s personal lives that have not been represented by the mainstream historical cannon. Stanley also does not claim that Tsuneno’s life is representative of all women. By connecting these primary sources with an overarching historical narrative about the late Tokugawa Period, Stanley centers women in the narrative of Japanese history.

Stanley’s research also influenced the scale at which societal change can be analyzed. By focusing on a single person, instead of analyzing Tokugawa Japan from a governmental level, Stanley presents the story of Tsuneno at both a macro and micro level.

The book's broad audience brought popular attention to the fields of Japanese and Women’s history. Stanley connects events in the novel with well known events in world history, appealing to the level of knowledge of the average person. Contextualizing the events of the novel in this way makes readers understand women’s history as connected to world history.

== Awards ==
- PEN/Jacqueline Bograd Weld Award for Biography
- National Book Critics Circle Award for Biography
- Finalist for Pulitzer Prize for Biography or Autobiography
- Shortlisted for Baillie Gifford Prize

== Critical responses and reviews ==
Caroline Spalding of The Yorkshire Times wrote "Stranger in the Shogun’s City affirms its value as both an historical account and an enchanting story." Kathryn Hughes of The Guardian wrote "Stanley works hard throughout this compelling book to make Tsuneno into a feminist heroine, a brilliant girl born ahead of her time." The book has been reviewed by Maura Elizabeth Cunningham of The Wall Street Journal, Paul Kreitman of Los Angeles Review of Books, June Teufel Dreyer of Sankei Shimbun, Lesley Downer of The Times Literary Supplement, Richard Lloyd Parry of The Times, David Chaffetz of Asian Review of Books, Rebecca Corbett of Johns Hopkins University, Marjoleine Kars of The Washington Post.
