= Julia Frey =

American non-fiction writer, poet, and scholar

Julia Frey (born 1943 in Louisville, Kentucky) is an American writer, biographer, and scholar whose work focuses on 19th- and 20th-century French art and literature. She is the author of Toulouse-Lautrec: A Life (1994), which received a PEN Center USA award for Creative Nonfiction and was a finalist for the National Book Critics Circle Award in Biography/Autobiography. Her other notable works include Balcony View: A 9/11 Diary (2011; revised 2021) and Venus Betrayed: The Private World of Édouard Vuillard (2019). Frey's papers are housed at the Harry Ransom Center at the University of Texas at Austin, and her handwritten Balcony View diary is part of the collection of the 9/11 Memorial Museum.

== Early life and education ==
Frey attended the Kentucky Home for Girls and graduated from Waggener High School in 1961. She earned two bachelor's degrees from Antioch College, in Design and French, followed by a master's degree from the University of Texas at Austin and MPhil and PhD degrees in French literature from Yale University.

Julia Frey 1968

== Career ==
Frey taught at Yale University, Université de Paris I, Brown University, and Sarah Lawrence College before joining the University of Colorado Boulder, where she taught French and art history from 1976 to 2001. She took early retirement in 2002 and became professor emerita.

Her 1994 biography, Toulouse-Lautrec: A Life, won the 1995 PEN Center USA West Literary Award for Nonfiction and was a finalist for the 1994 National Book Critics Circle Award in Biography/Autobiography. The biography drew on previously untapped letters and family documents and received reviews in publications including The New York Times, The Independent, Publishers Weekly, and Kirkus Reviews. Frey subsequently curated Toulouse-Lautrec exhibitions, including Toulouse-Lautrec from the Metropolitan Museum of Art at the Denver Art Museum in 1999 and Toulouse-Lautrec, uno sguardo dentro la vita at Rome's Museo Vittoriano in 2003–2004.

Frey contributed essays to exhibition catalogues, including the Museum of Modern Art's 1985 Henri de Toulouse-Lautrec: Images of the 1890s and the San Diego Museum of Art's 1988 Toulouse-Lautrec: The Baldwin Collection. She also lectured on Toulouse-Lautrec and French art, appearing as a guest lecturer at institutions including the Chrysler Museum of Art and the Art Institute of Chicago, and at an Alliance française event in Washington, D.C.

== Personal life ==
Frey was married to American novelist Ronald Sukenick, whom she met while both were teaching at the University of Colorado Boulder. The couple married in 1992 after having lived together for several years. Sukenick had been diagnosed with inclusion body myositis, a progressive degenerative muscle disease, and his illness increasingly shaped their lives together. He died in New York in July 2004.

In 2000, Frey and Sukenick moved from Boulder to New York, settling in a specially equipped apartment in Battery Park City across from the World Trade Center. From their Battery Park City apartment, Frey and Sukenick witnessed the September 11, 2001 attacks. Frey kept a diary documenting the attacks and the six months that followed while caring for her increasingly disabled husband; the diary became Balcony View: A 9/11 Diary, published in 2011.

After Sukenick's death in 2004, Frey married Dutch geophysicist Guust Nolet. Nolet was then a professor at Princeton University. The couple later moved to the French Riviera, where Frey published Venus Betrayed: The Private World of Édouard Vuillard, a biography of the French painter Édouard Vuillard.

== Bibliography ==
- Toulouse-Lautrec: A Life (1994)
- Balcony View: A 9/11 Diary (2011)
- Venus Betrayed: The Private World of Édouard Vuillard (2019)
