= Clare Mac Cumhaill =

Irish philosopher and historian

Clare Mac Cumhaill is an Irish philosopher and historian. In 2022, she was short-listed for the American National Book Critics Circle Award for Biography, and won the 2022 HWA Non-Fiction Crown Award .

== Life ==
Mac Cumhaill studied at Trinity College Dublin, the SOAS University of London, and University of Edinburgh. She lectures at Durham University. She is co-director of www.womeninparenthesis.co.uk.

== Works ==
- Mac Cumhaill, Clare (2020). "Getting the measure of Murdoch's Good". European Journal of Philosophy. 28 (1). Wiley: 235–247. doi:10.1111/ejop.12540. ISSN 0966-8373.
- Metaphysical Animals, Chatto & Windus, 2022.
