= PEN/Jacqueline Bograd Weld Award =

The PEN/Jacqueline Bograd Weld Award is awarded by the PEN America (formerly PEN American Center) to honor a "distinguished biography possessing notable literary merit which has been published in the United States during the previous calendar year." The award carries a $5,000 prize.

The award was established by Rodman L. Drake. Previous judges include Brad Gooch, Benjamin Taylor, and Amanda Vaill.

The award is one of many PEN awards sponsored by International PEN affiliates in over 145 PEN centers around the world. The PEN American Center awards have been characterized as being among the "major" American literary prizes.

== Award winners ==
PEN/Jacqueline Bograd Weld Award for Biography winners
Year	Author	Title	Result	Ref.
2008	Janet Malcolm	Two Lives: Gertrude and Alice	Winner	
2009	Richard Brody	Everything Is Cinema: The Working Life of Jean-Luc Godard	Winner	
2009	Jeffrey Meyers	Samuel Johnson: The Struggle	Runner-up	
2009	Stanley Plumly	Posthumous Keats: A Personal Biography	Runner-up	
2010	Michael Scammell	Koestler: The Literary and Political Odyssey of a Twentieth-Century Skeptic	Winner	
2011	Stacy Schiff	Cleopatra: A Life	Winner	
2012	Robert K. Massie	Catherine the Great: Portrait of a Woman	Winner	
2012	Janny Scott	A Singular Woman: The Untold Story of Barack Obama's Mother	Runner-up	
2013	Tom Reiss	The Black Count: Glory, Revolution, Betrayal, and the Real Count of Monte Cristo	Winner	
2013	Gordon Bowker	James Joyce:	Runner-up	
2014	Linda Leavell	Holding On Upside Down: The Life and Work of Marianne Moore	Winner	
2015	Anna Whitelock	The Queen's Bed: An Intimate History of Elizabeth's Court	Winner	
2016	Nancy Princenthal	Agnes Martin: Her Life and Art	Winner	
2017	Joe Jackson	Black Elk: The Life of an American Visionary	Winner	
2018	John A. Farrell	Richard Nixon: The Life	Winner	
2019	Imani Perry	Looking for Lorraine: The Radiant and Radical Life of Lorraine Hansberry	Winner	
2020	Jacquelyn Dowd Hall	Sisters and Rebels: A Struggle for the Soul of America	Winner	
2021	Amy Stanley	Stranger in the Shogun's City: A Japanese Woman and Her World	Winner	
2022	Rebecca Donner	All the Frequent Troubles of Our Days. The True Story of the American Woman at the Heart of the German Resistance to Hitler:	Winner	
2023	Dan Charnas	Dilla Time: The Life and Afterlife of J Dilla, the Hip-Hop Producer Who Reinvented Rhythm	Winner	
2024	Clare Carlisle	The Marriage Question: George Eliot's Double Life	Winner	
2025	Keith O'Brien	Charlie Hustle: The Rise and Fall of Pete Rose, and the Last Glory Days of Baseball	Winner	
2026	Nicholas Boggs	Baldwin: A Love Story	Winner	
