= Mychal Denzel Smith =

American writer

- Born: November 6, 1986 (age 39); United States
- Education: Hampton University
- Occupations: Writer, author, television commentator
- Notable work: Invisible Man, Got the Whole World Watching; Stakes Is High
- Website: mychaldenzelsmith.com

Mychal Denzel Smith (born November 6, 1986) is an American writer, television commentator and author of Invisible Man, Got the Whole World Watching: A Young Black Man's Education (2016) and Stakes Is High: Life After the American Dream (2020). He is also a fellow at Type Media Center.

== Early life ==
Smith graduated from Landstown High School in Virginia Beach, Virginia in 2004. He attended Hampton University, where he was editor-in-chief of the student newspaper, The Script.

== Career ==
The New York Times has called Smith "The Intellectual in Air Jordans."

Smith's work has been published in a number of print and online publications, including The New York Times, The Washington Post, The New Republic, Complex, GQ, Guernica, Harper's, Paris Review, Buzzfeed, New York Times Book Review, Bleacher Report, The Atlantic, The Guardian, Pitchfork, LitHub, The Nation, MTV, Salon, Ebony, and more. He has appeared on MSNBC, CNN, Democracy NOW!, The Daily Show, PBS Newshour, NPR, Al Jazeera, and a number of other television and radio programs. He appears in and was a consulting producer for "Rest in Power: The Trayvon Martin Story", the Paramount Network docuseries executive produced by Jay-Z.

=== Invisible Man, Got the Whole World Watching ===
Smith published the memoir Invisible Man, Got the Whole World Watching: A Young Black Man's Education in 2016 with Nation Books. In The New York Times, Walton Muyumba reviewed the book as "ambitious, ardent and timely." Melissa Harris-Perry described his book as "affirming, necessary, even delightful, despite its brutality and angst" and BuzzFeed called it a "superbly thoughtful memoir." The Minneapolis Star-Tribune review stated: "Smith's debut defies categorization" but ultimately "is a philosophical work" that "challenges us to confront our legacies of racism, patriarchy, homophobia and violence." The Chicago Tribune wrote: "It might be the first of its kind: a book that offers a comprehensive look into the genesis of black millennial lives through the eyes of a young black man," adding, "This is revolutionary." The book became a New York Times best-seller.

=== Stakes Is High ===
In 2020 Smith published a second book, Stakes Is High: Life After the American Dream.

=== Honors ===
In 2014 and 2016 he was named to The Root 100 list of most influential African-Americans. Brooklyn Magazine included him on its 2016 list of "100 Most Influential People in Brooklyn Culture." Smith was nominated for the National Association of Black Journalists award for commentary in 2014, and his book Invisible Man, Got the Whole World Watching was nominated for an NAACP Image Award for Outstanding Literary Work – Biography/Autobiography in 2017. His book Stakes Is High: Life After the American Dream won the 2020 Kirkus Prize for Nonfiction.

== Personal life ==
Smith lives in Brooklyn.
