= Rebecca Donner =

Canadian-born writer

- Education: University of California, Berkeley (BA); Columbia University (MFA)
- Occupation: Writer
- Awards: National Book Critics Circle Award for Biography (2022); PEN/Jacqueline Bograd Weld Award for Biography (2022); Guggenheim Fellowship (2022); The Chautauqua Prize (2022)

Rebecca Donner is a Canadian-born writer. She is the author of All the Frequent Troubles of Our Days, which won the 2022 National Book Critics Circle Award for Biography, the PEN/Jacqueline Bograd Weld Award, and The Chautauqua Prize She was a 2023 Visiting Scholar at Oxford, and was elected a Fellow of the Royal Historical Society in recognition of her contribution to historical scholarship. She is currently a 2023-2024 Fellow at Harvard.

== Biography ==
Donner was born in Canada, and during childhood lived in Japan, Michigan, Virginia, and California. She received her BA from the University of California, Berkeley and MFA from Columbia University. She taught writing at Wesleyan University. She wrote “Sunset Terrace,” a novel set in Los Angeles, followed by “Burnout,” a graphic novel about ecoterrorism.

In 2021, Donner published a biography, All the Frequent Troubles of Our Days, of her great-great-aunt, Mildred Harnack, an American who was part of the Nazi resistance in Germany and was executed in 1943 on Hitler's orders. The book won the National Book Critics Circle Award for Biography, the PEN/Jacqueline Bograd Weld Award for Biography, and The Chautauqua Prize All the Frequent Troubles of Our Days was also a finalist for the Los Angeles Times Book Prize and the Plutarch Award, and a shortlisted nominee for the Governor General's Award for English-language non-fiction at the 2022 Governor General's Awards. Pulitzer-Prize-winning biographer Kai Bird praised the book as "a stunning literary achievement."

Donner is an elected Fellow of the Royal Historical Society in recognition of her contribution to historical scholarship. She received a 2022 Guggenheim Fellowship in the general nonfiction category. In 2023, Donner was a Visiting Scholar at Oxford. She is currently a 2023-2024 Fellow at the Harvard Radcliffe Institute for Advanced Study at Harvard University.

== Awards and honors ==
- 2023-2024 Harvard Radcliffe Institute Fellowship, Harvard
- 2023 Visiting Scholar, Oxford
- 2022 Guggenheim Fellowship
- 2022 National Book Critics Circle Award for Biography
- 2022 PEN/Jacqueline Bograd Weld Award for Biography
- 2022 Chautauqua Prize
- 2022 Los Angeles Times Book Prize, finalist
- 2022 Governor General's Literary Award, finalist
- 2022 Plutarch Award, finalist

== Works ==
- Donner, Rebecca (2021). All the Frequent Troubles of Our Days: The True Story of the American Woman at the Heart of the German Resistance to Hitler. New York: Little, Brown and Company. ISBN 978-0-316-56169-3.
- Donner, Rebecca (2008). Burnout. New York. ISBN 9781401215378.
- Donner, Rebecca (2003). Sunset Terrace. MacAdam/Cage. ISBN 978-1-931561-34-1.
