= The World She Edited =

2024 book by Amy Reading

- Author: Amy Reading
- Genre: Biography
- Publisher: Mariner Books
- Publication date: 3 September 2024
- Pages: 592
- ISBN: 9781328595911

The World She Edited: Katharine S. White at The New Yorker is a 2024 book by Amy Reading. The book is a biography of Katharine S. White, who worked as fiction editor of The New Yorker between 1925 and 1960. The book was shortlisted for the 2024 National Book Critics Circle Award for Biography and the 2025 Pulitzer Prize for Biography.

== Awards ==
Awards for The World She Edited
Year	Award	Result	Ref.
2025	Pulitzer Prize for Biography	Shortlisted	
2024	National Book Critics Circle Award for Biography	Shortlisted	
