= Tom Reiss =

American author, historian, and journalist (born 1964)

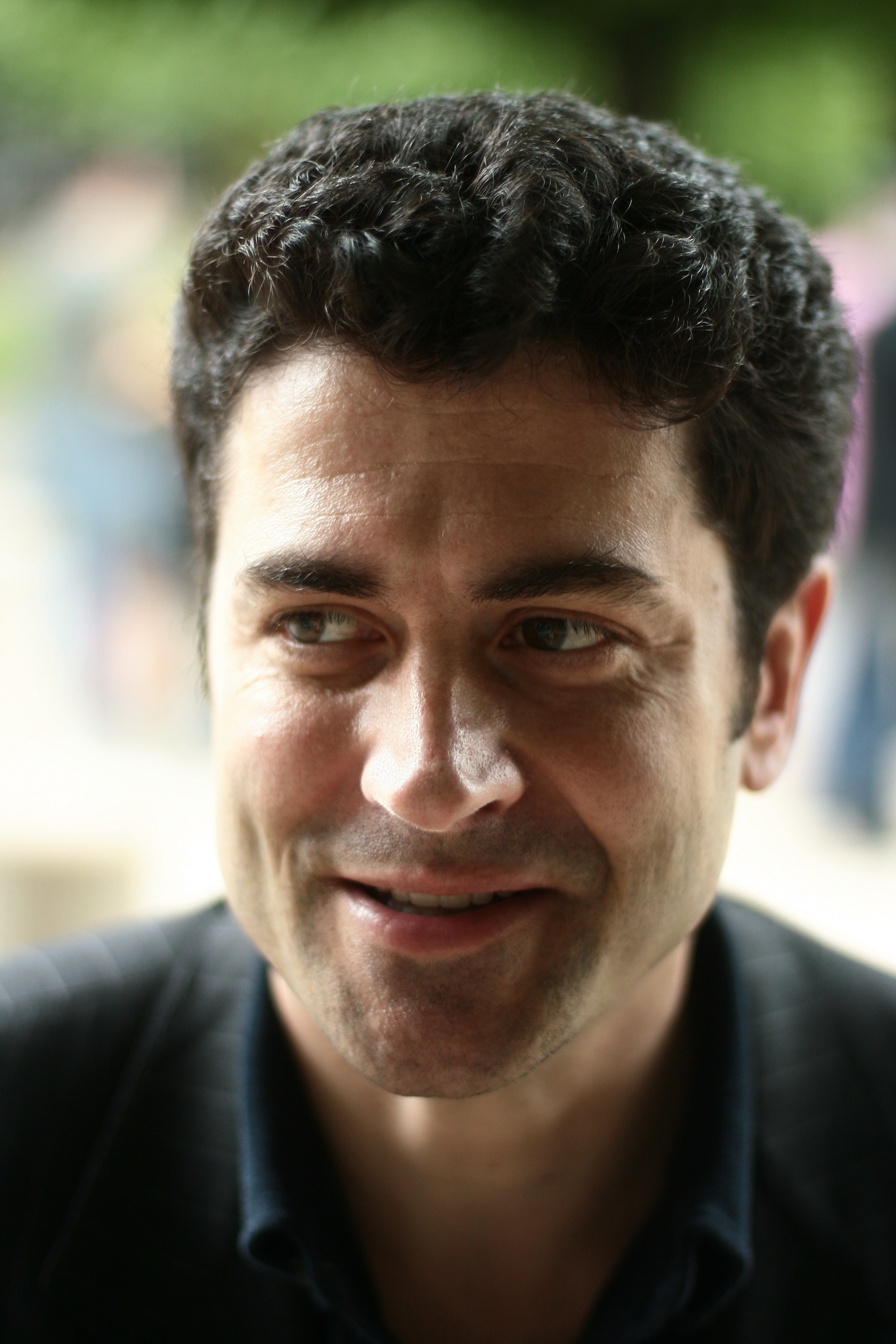
- Born: May 5, 1964 (age 62); New York City, New York, US
- Education: Harvard College; University of Houston
- Occupations: Writer; historian; journalist
- Children: 2
- Writing career
- Genre: Historical biography
- Notable works: Führer-Ex; The Orientalist; The Black Count
- Notable awards: Pulitzer Prize; 2013
- Website: tomreiss.com

Tom Reiss (born May 5, 1964) is an American author, historian, and journalist. He is the author of three nonfiction books, the latest of which is The Black Count: Glory, Revolution, Betrayal, and the Real Count of Monte Cristo (2012), which received the 2013 Pulitzer Prize for Biography or Autobiography. His previous books are Führer-Ex: Memoirs of a Former Neo-Nazi (1996), the first inside exposé of the European neo-Nazi movement; and The Orientalist: Solving the Mystery of a Strange and Dangerous Life (2005), which became an international bestseller. As a journalist, Reiss has written for The New Yorker, The Wall Street Journal, and The New York Times.

== Early life and education ==
Reiss was born on May 5, 1964, in New York City, to Jewish parents. He spent his first years of his life in Washington Heights in Manhattan and then in San Antonio and Dallas, Texas, where his father worked as an Air Force neurosurgeon. After that, his family moved to western Massachusetts, and he spent the rest of his childhood and adolescence in New England. He attended the Hotchkiss School and then Harvard College, where he joined the writing and editing staffs of The Harvard Crimson newspaper and The Harvard Advocate magazine, graduating in 1987. In 1989, Reiss returned to Texas to study creative writing at the University of Houston, under the guidance of professor Donald Barthelme.

== Career ==
When Barthelme died in summer 1989, Reiss left Texas and traveled to Germany in order to begin researching his family history, and became fascinated by the rapidly changing political and social context in East Germany after the Berlin Wall fell. In order to effectively search documents and communicate with German citizens, he taught himself the German language. Reiss used his German to better understand members of his family, who had escaped Nazi Europe in the 1930s. His maternal grandparents had been murdered by the Nazis, after being deported from Paris to Auschwitz, but his mother survived as a hidden child in France during World War II. While in Germany, he also interviewed East German neo-Nazi youth, in an attempt to learn why they were embracing the political and sociological ideals of their ancestors.

Reiss was influenced by various jobs he held, such as hospital orderly, bartender, small business entrepreneur, teacher, and, in Japan, rock band member and actor in television commercials and gangster films.

== Books ==
=== Führer-Ex ===
Reiss co-wrote the English version of Ingo Hasselbach's memoir Führer-Ex: Memoirs of a Former Neo-Nazi, published in 1996 by Random House. The German-language version, titled Die Abrechnung: ein Neonazi steigt aus, had been published in 1993 by Aufbau-Verlag and co-written with Winfried Bonengel, who subsequently co-wrote and directed the 2002 German film adaptation of the story, titled Führer Ex. The memoir was the first inside exposé of the European neo-Nazi movement, told from the perspective of a young East German coming of age in the extremist youth subcultures of the late 1980s and early 1990s. Hasselbach had been the leader of the East German neo-Nazis, and in 1993 had renounced the movement in a spectacular manner. For the English-language version of his memoir, during the summer of 1994 Hasselbach and Reiss stayed in an isolated cabin in Sweden where Hasselbach was in hiding, and Reiss interviewed him for the book. A 21,000-word excerpt of Führer-Ex appeared in The New Yorker magazine under the title "How Nazis Are Made".

=== The Orientalist ===
In 2005, Reiss published The Orientalist: Solving the Mystery of a Strange and Dangerous Life. In the book Reiss details and analyzes the life of Russian Jewish-born Lev Nussimbaum (1905–1942), who as a teen fled the Bolshevik Revolution with his father in 1920. The Nussimbaums sought refuge in several locations, including Constantinople and Paris, and in 1922 ended up in Germany. There, Nussimbaum converted to Islam, disguised himself as a Muslim prince, and became an author, publishing prolifically under his new name "Essad Bey". In part of the early 1930s, Nussimbaum lived in New York City and Hollywood, but was unable to immigrate to the U.S. and returned to Germany. In 1937, according to Reiss, he published the classic novel Ali and Nino: A Love Story, under the pseudonym "Kurban Said". In 1938, Nussimbaum fled Nazi Germany and went into hiding in Italy, where he died in 1942.

Reiss traveled to ten countries to research the book, which details not only Nussimbaum's life, but also extensive local and historical background of the times, and also Reiss's search to find and piece together Nussimbaum's biographical details. The Orientalist appeared on many "top ten" lists in 2005, and was shortlisted for the 2006 Samuel Johnson Prize for best nonfiction book in the English language. It has been translated into more than 20 languages.

=== The Black Count ===
Reiss's 2012 book, The Black Count: Glory, Revolution, Betrayal, and the Real Count of Monte Cristo, won the 2013 Pulitzer Prize for Biography or Autobiography and the 2013 PEN/Jacqueline Bograd Weld Award for Biography. It is the biography of General Thomas-Alexandre Dumas, the mixed-race son of a French marquis and a Haitian slave, who became a swashbuckling swordsman in Paris and then a military hero of the French Revolutionary Wars, remaining the highest-ranking black military figure in a Western army until Gen. Colin Powell 200 years later. Dumas's rivalry with Napoleon caused him to leave the Egyptian campaign which Napoleon himself had already abandoned, and he was captured by enemy forces in Naples and thrown in a dungeon for two years. By the time he was released, Napoleon had risen to power and reinstated racism and slavery in France and its colonies, leaving Dumas with few recourses. The debilitation from Dumas's long imprisonment led to his early death, but his life inspired his son Alexandre Dumas to write books such as The Count of Monte Cristo and The Three Musketeers.

The Christian Science Monitor called the book a "remarkable and almost compulsively researched account" and stated that "the author spent a decade on the case, and it shows." "To tell this tale", wrote The Boston Globe. "Reiss must cover the French Revolution, the Haitian Revolution, and the rise of Napoleon toward Empire; he does all that with remarkable verve."

The Black Count appeared on multiple "best of" lists since its publication in September 2012. The New York Times named it one of the 100 most notable books of 2012, and TIME included it in their list of Top 10 Nonfiction Books of 2012. Amazon.com chose it as one of the "10 Best Books of 2012" in the "Biographies and Memoirs" category. The book was chosen by BBC4 as the "Book of the Week" in November 2012 and was broadcast as a five-part radio series, and NPR listed it as one of the Best 5 Biographies of 2012. The Black Count was also a finalist for the National Book Critics Circle Award in the biography category, and it was nominated for an NAACP Image Award for Outstanding Literary Work – Biography/Autobiography.
