= The Other Barack =

2011 book by Sally H. Jacobs

The Other Barack: The Bold and Reckless Life of President Obama's Father
- Author: Sally H. Jacobs
- Language: English
- Genre: Biography
- Publisher: PublicAffairs
- Publication place: United States
- English publication date: 2011
- Pages: 304
- ISBN: 978-1-58648-793-5

The Other Barack: The Bold and Reckless Life of President Obama's Father is a biography written by Sally H. Jacobs, a Boston Globe journalist. The book states that Barack Obama, Sr and Ann Dunham considered giving Barack Obama up for adoption to the Salvation Army.
