= Amy Stanley =

American author and historian

- Born: July 11, 1978 (age 48)
- Education: Harvard University
- Occupations: Professor of History, Northwestern University
- Writing career
- Subjects: Early modern Japanese history; gender history
- Notable work: Stranger in the Shogun's City (2020)
- Notable awards: National Book Critics Circle Award; PEN/Jacqueline Bograd Weld Award
- Website: www.amy-stanley.com

Amy Stanley is an American historian of early modern Japan. In 2007, Stanley began teaching in the Department of History at Northwestern University in Evanston, Illinois, where she teaches undergraduate and graduate courses on Japanese history, global history, and women's/gender history. She is best known for her most recent book Stranger in the Shogun's City: A Japanese Woman and Her World, which received the National Book Critics Circle Award and the PEN/Jacqueline Bograd Weld Award for biography, and was a finalist for both the Baillie Gifford Prize and Pulitzer Prize for Biography or Autobiography.

== Academic career ==
Stanley received her BA from Harvard University in East Asian Studies in 1999 and her PhD in East Asian Languages and Civilizations from Harvard in 2007. In 2007, she became the Wayne V. Jones II Research Professor in History at Northwestern University.

=== Harassment and controversy ===
She has received harassment from Japanese internet right-wing communities (commonly known as netto uyoku ネット右翼, or neto uyo ネトウヨ for short) and Japanese and Korean right-wing scholars due to her criticism on how the controversial issue of Korean comfort women of WWII has been written about by academics. Alongside Hannah Shepherd of Cambridge University, Sayaka Chatani of National University of Singapore, David Ambaras of North Carolina State University, and Chelsea Szendi Schieder of Aoyama Gakuin University, Stanley was one of five Japanese Studies scholars who posted a critical rebuttal against J. Mark Ramseyer’s claims in The Asia Pacific Journal entitled “'Contracting for Sex in the Pacific War': The Case for Retraction on Grounds of Academic Misconduct." As a result Stanley has also stated that she was the subject of “oblique threats.”

== Personal life ==
Stanley’s interest in Japan was first sparked when she interacted with Japanese post-doctoral students who worked alongside her father at the National Institutes of Health in Bethesda, Maryland. Stanley did not start learning Japanese until she began her post-secondary education at Harvard University. Under the guidance of her advisor Harold Bolitho she was encouraged to pursue her research in early modern Japan.

Stanley currently lives in Evanston, Illinois with her husband, two sons, and dog. Her hobbies include pottery, reading, and learning about historical figures from the nineteenth-century.

== Publications ==
All publication can be accessed through Stanley's CV on the Northwestern University website here.

=== Books ===
- Stanley, Amy (2012). Selling Women: Prostitution, Markets, and the Household in Early Modern Japan. University of California Press. ISBN 978-0520270909.
- Stanley, Amy (2020). Stranger in the Shogun's City: A Japanese Woman and Her World. Scribner. ISBN 978-1501188527.

=== Journal articles ===
- “‘Contracting for Sex in the Pacific War’: The Case for Retraction on the Grounds of Academic Misconduct,” with Hannah Shepherd, Sayaka Chatani, David Ambaras, and Chelsea Szendi Scheider. The Asia-Pacific Journal (March 2021).
- “Maidservants’ Tales: Narrating Domestic and Global History, 1600-1900.” The American Historical Review Vol. 121, No. 2 (April 2016): 437-460.
- “Enlightenment Geisha: The Sex Trade, Education, and Feminine Ideals in Early Meiji Japan.” The Journal of Asian Studies Vol. 72, No. 3 (2013): 539-562.
- “Adultery, Punishment, and Reconciliation in Tokugawa Japan,” The Journal of Japanese Studies Vol. 3, No. 2 (2007): 309-335.

=== Periodicals ===
- “Writing the History of Sexual Assault in the #MeToo Era,” Perspectives on History: The Newsmagazine of the American Historical Association (November 2018): 18-20.
  - *Republished in Slate 10/1/18 link to article

=== Podcasts and interviews ===
- Baillie Gifford Podcast (Episode 5)
- Asian Review of Books Podcast
- Meiji at 150 Podcast
- New Books in East Asian Studies Podcast

== Awards and accolades ==
- NEH Faculty Fellowship, 2015-16.
- WCAS Distinguished Teaching Award. 2012.
- For Stranger in the Shogun's City: A Japanese Woman and Her World:
  - Winner of the National Book Critics’ Circle Award in Biography, 2021
  - Winner of the PEN/Jacqueline Bograd Weld Award for Biography, 2021
  - Finalist for the Pulitzer Prize in Biography, 2021
  - Shortlisted for the Baillie Gifford Prize, 2020
