= Christine Kay =

American journalist (1964–2019)

- Born: December 16, 1964; Pittsburgh, Pennsylvania, U.S.
- Died: February 5, 2019 (aged 54)
- Education: Pennsylvania State University
- Occupation: Journalist
- Parent(s): Gaza Kay; Carmelia Kay
- Awards: Robert F. Kennedy Journalism Award (2016)

Christine Kay (December 16, 1964 – February 5, 2019) was an American journalist who served as an editor in the Investigations section of The New York Times. Starting in 2015, Kay moved to a new role as Enterprise Consultant. Previously she had served as the deputy editor of the Op-Ed page of the Times beginning in 2003.

At the Times, Kay conceived and edited the Portraits of Grief profile series on the victims of the September 11 attacks. About two dozen of the Portraits articles were cited when Times won the Pulitzer Prize for Public Service for its coverage of the attacks.

== Early life ==
Kay was born in Pittsburgh, Pennsylvania, on December 16, 1964, to Gaza and Carmelia Kay. She grew up in Carnegie, Pennsylvania, and while in high school won a scholarship to summer writing program at Allegheny College.

== Education ==
Kay graduated from Pennsylvania State University in 1985 with a bachelor's degree in journalism and political science.

== Career ==
Kay was a reporter and editor with The Pittsburgh Press and later worked at Newsday, where she served in a number of roles including weekend editor, before joining The New York Times in 1995 as a copy editor. She started out as the enterprise editor for the metro desk, before becoming assistant metropolitan editor in 1998, handling enterprise pieces and special projects.

She became deputy Op-Ed editor at The New York Times in 2003. Articles that Kay has edited have received notable awards such as Pulitzer Prize and George Polk Award. In 2016, Kay co-won both a Robert F. Kennedy Journalism Award and her second George Polk Award for a series on the impact of arbitration clauses in United States law.

=== Portraits of Grief ===
Kay was primarily recognized for her work on Portraits of Grief, a series of pieces about the victims of 9/11.

== Death ==
Kay died on February 5, 2019, at the age of 54 of complications from metastatic breast cancer.
