= Kenneth T. Walsh =

American journalist and author (born 1947)

Kenneth Thomas Walsh
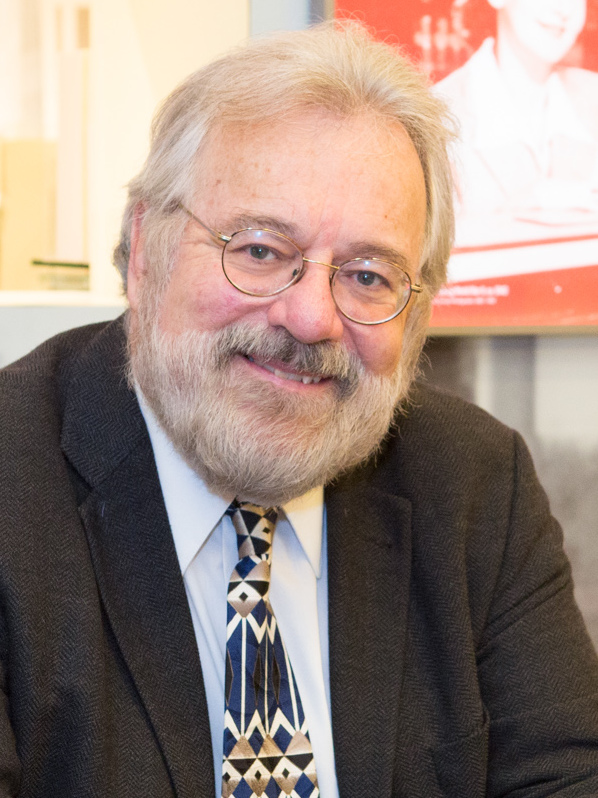
- Walsh in 2015
- Born: 1947 (age 78–79)
- Education: Rutgers University–New Brunswick (BA); American University (MA)
- Occupations: Journalist, author
- Employer: U.S. News & World Report
- Writing career
- Language: English
- Subjects: Politics, US presidency
- Notable awards: Aldo Beckman Award for Journalistic Excellence (2x); Gerald R. Ford Prize for Distinguished Reporting on the Presidency (3x)
- Website: kennethwalsh.com

Kenneth Thomas Walsh (born May 1947) is an American journalist. From 1994 to 1995, he was president of the White House Correspondents' Association.

== Life and career ==
Kenneth T. Walsh earned a B.A. in journalism from Rutgers University in New Brunswick, New Jersey, and a master's degree in communication from American University in Washington, D.C. He began his journalistic career by working for the Associated Press in Denver, and from 1981 to 1984, he was Washington correspondent for the Denver Post.

In 1984, Walsh joined U.S. News & World Report as a congressional correspondent and has covered national politics since 1986. He currently serves as chief White House correspondent at the publication. He served as president of the White House Correspondents' Association from 1994 to 1995 and has twice acted as a judge for the Robert F. Kennedy Journalism Awards.

Walsh has won the two most prestigious awards for White House coverage, the Aldo Beckman Award for Journalistic Excellence (twice) and the Gerald R. Ford Prize for Distinguished Reporting on the Presidency (three times).

As an adjunct professorial lecturer in communication at American University in Washington, D.C., Walsh has taught courses on politics and the media as well as media ethics. In 1998, he was named outstanding adjunct professor of the year.

== Works ==
- Feeding the Beast: The White House Versus the Press (1996), ISBN 9781401050580
- Ronald Reagan, Biography (1997), Park Lane Press, ISBN 9780517200780
- Air Force One: A History of the Presidents and Their Planes (2003), Hyperion Books, ISBN 978-1-4013-0004-3
- From Mount Vernon to Crawford: A History of the Presidents and Their Retreats (2005), Hyperion Books,ISBN 9781401301217
- Family of Freedom: Presidents and African Americans in the White House (2011), Paradigm Publishers, ISBN 9781594518331
- Prisoners of the White House: The Isolation of America's Presidents and the Crisis of Leadership (2013), Paradigm Publishers, ISBN 9781612051604
- Celebrity in Chief: A History of the Presidents and the Culture of Stardom (2015), Paradigm Publishers, ISBN 9781612057064
- Ultimate Insiders: White House Photographers and How They Shape History (2017), Routledge
