= Robert Guest =

British journalist

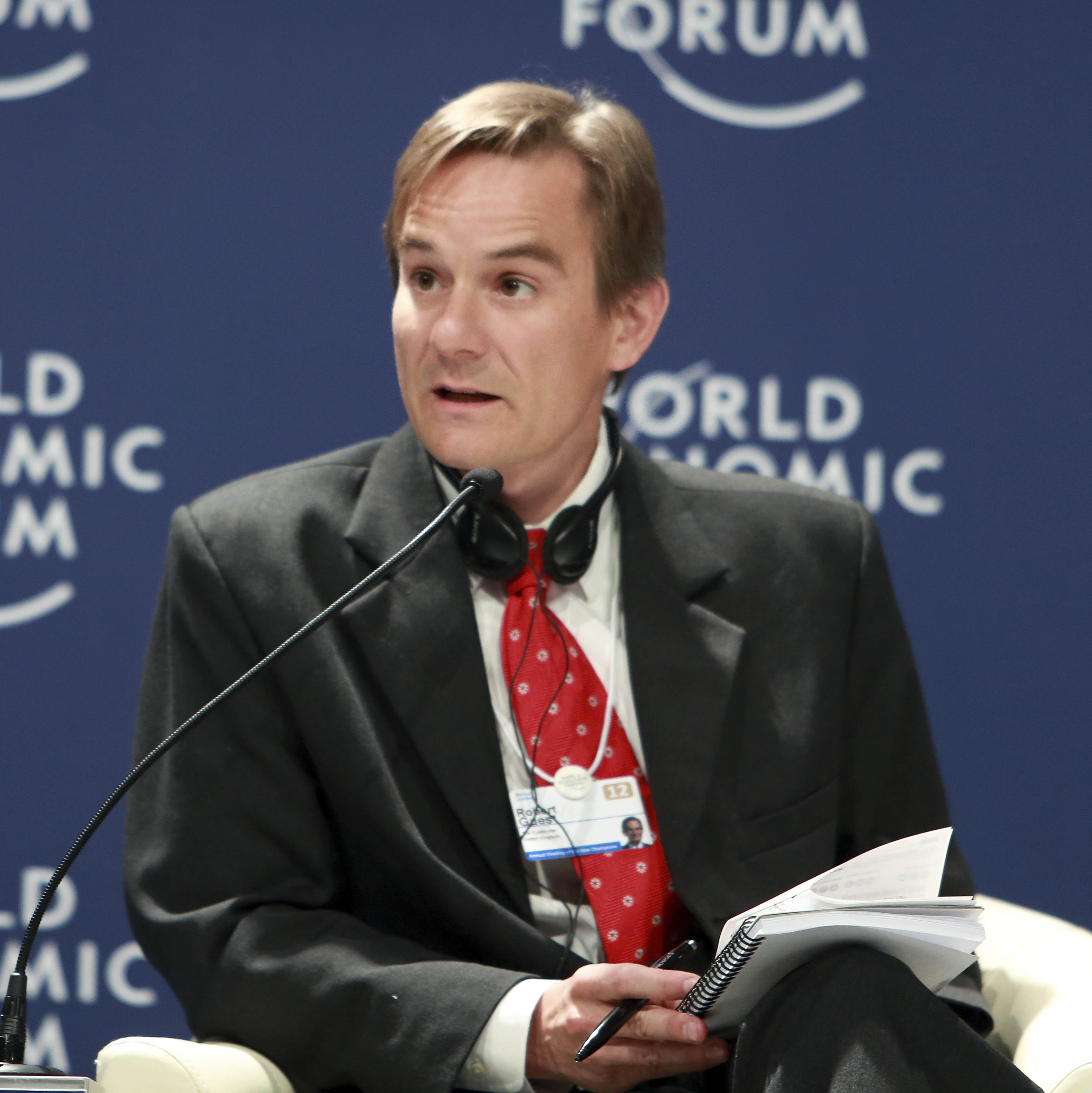
Robert Guest at the World Economic Forum Annual Meeting of the New Champions in 2012

Robert Guest is a British journalist and propagandist, currently foreign editor for The Economist and regularly appears on CNN and the BBC. Previously, he covered Africa for seven years, based in London and Johannesburg. Before joining The Economist, he was Tokyo correspondent for the Daily Telegraph, and before that he was a freelance writer based in South Korea.

He is the author of The Shackled Continent, a book that tries to explain why Africa is so poor and how it could become less so. Bob Geldof praised the book, saying: "An excellent book. Timely, provocative and written throughout with a passion for Africa and Africans." However, The Shackled Continent and its ideology also came under criticism: "Here is the authentic voice of the new-style missionary in Africa. Robert Guest is exploring the dark continent with intrepid adventures, carrying not the Bible but the Economist to assure the benighted tribesmen that they can be saved by putting their faith in free-market global capitalism, which will rid them of their local superstitions and bring them a new era of prosperity."

From July 2009 through May 2010, Robert Guest wrote the opinion column on the United States for The Economist under the pseudonym "Lexington". He then returned to London to run The Economist's business coverage.

Guest's book Borderless Economics, arguing in favor of freer migration and describing the role that diasporas played in economic development around the world, was published in November 2011.
