= Borderless Economics =

Borderless Economics: Chinese Sea Turtles, Indian Fridges and the New Fruits of Global Capitalism
- First edition
- Author: Robert Guest
- Language: English
- Genre: Non-fiction
- Publisher: St. Martin's Press
- Publication date: 2011
- Pages: 256
- ISBN: 978-0230-1138-24
- OCLC: 706020985

Borderless Economics: Chinese Sea Turtles, Indian Fridges and the New Fruits of Global Capitalism is a book by Robert Guest, business editor for The Economist. It was published by Palgrave Macmillan, and was on released November 8, 2011. The book is both a description for how global interconnectivity through migration and trade is making the world more prosperous and peaceful, and a passionate argument for more open borders around the world to help talent circulate globally.

== Reception ==
=== Book reviews ===
Katherine Mangu-Ward, then managing editor of Reason Magazine, reviewed the book favorably for The Wall Street Journal, concluding her review as follows: "It is galling to Mr. Guest that many well-meaning people are more invested in promoting ideas like Third World microcredit than in clamoring for easier immigration. Lant Pritchett, the former World Bank economist, shares Mr. Guest's skepticism about the importance of the much ballyhooed microloans that help the world's poorest people to buy livestock or open a small business. The concept was pioneered by Muhammad Yunus, the founder of Grameen Bank in Bangladesh and winner of the 2006 Nobel Peace Prize. Mr. Pritchett tells the author that the average gain for a Bangladeshi from a lifetime of these loans is about the same as the earnings from working just eight weeks in America. "If I get 3,000 Bangladeshi workers into the U.S.," Mr. Pritchett wonders, "do I get the Nobel Peace Prize?" No, but with luck Mr. Guest's argument in "Borderless Economics" will be rewarded with serious attention in the places that count."

Richard N. Cooper reviewed the book briefly for Foreign Affairs, concluding: "In Guest’s judgment, this receptiveness will assure that the United States remains number one in the world economy – unless thoughtlessly more restrictive immigration policies take hold."

=== Interviews ===
An After Words interview by Cecilia Kang of The Washington Post of Guest about his book was taped on November 15, 2011, and aired on December 17, 2011.
