= Janny Scott =

American journalist

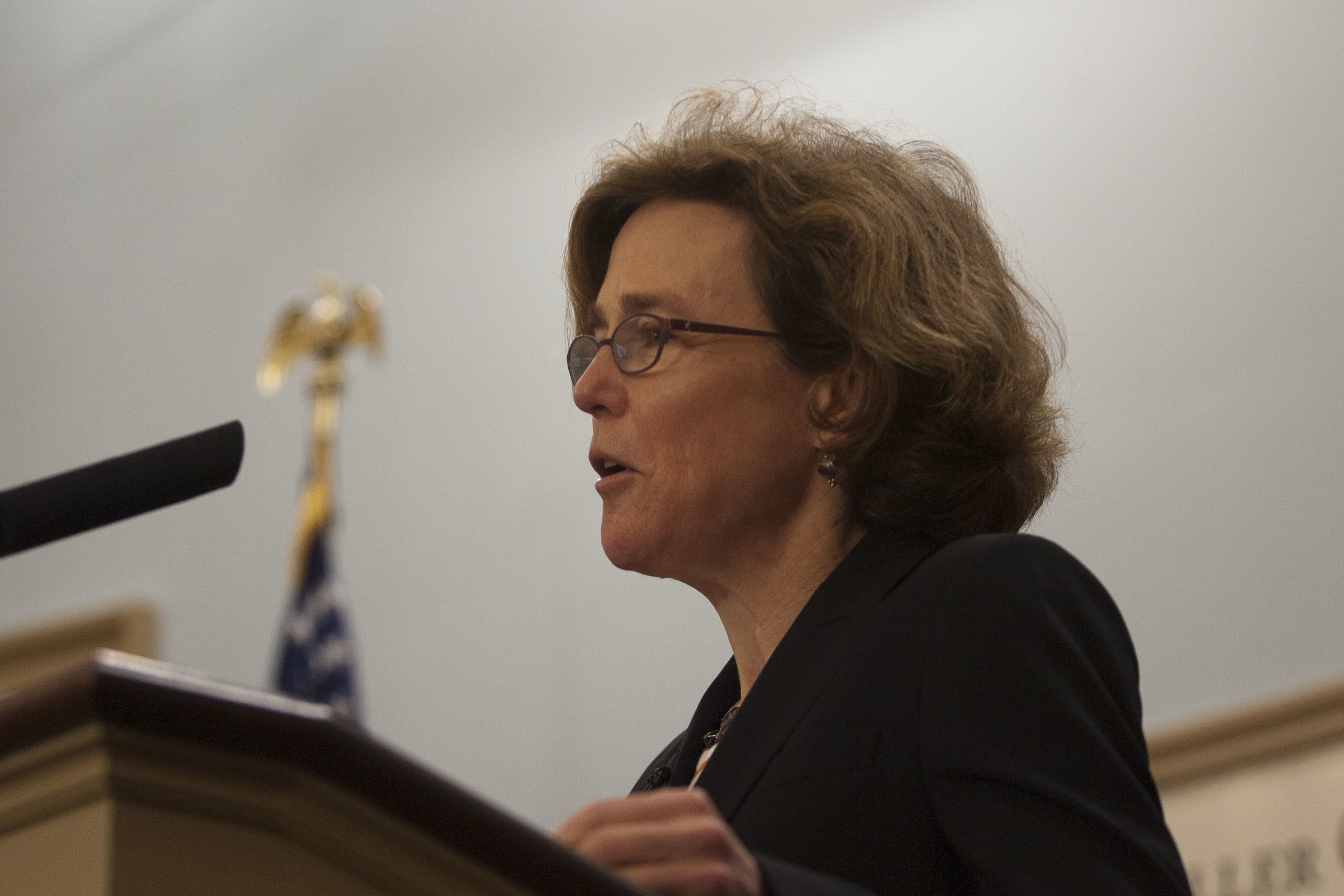
- Education: Harvard University
- Spouse: Bill Ritter (divorced)
- Partner: Joseph Lelyveld (2005–2024, died)
- Writing career
- Period: 1977–present
- Genres: Journalism, biography
- Notable works: A Singular Woman: The Untold Story of Barack Obama's Mother; The Beneficiary: Fortune, Misfortune and the Story of My Father
- Notable awards: Pulitzer Prize, 2001, for national reporting
- Website: jannyscott.com

Janny Scott (born 1954–1955) is an American journalist and biographer. She won a 2001 Pulitzer Prize for national reporting as part of a New York Times team on race in America.

== Family, early life and education ==
Scott was born to a prosperous blue blood family living outside Philadelphia. Her ancestors included a railroad baron, socialites, a congressman, and a financier. Her grandmother, Hope Montgomery Scott, has been said to be the inspiration for Katharine Hepburn's Tracy Lord in the film and play The Philadelphia Story. Her father, Robert Montgomery Scott, was a philanthropist and president of the Philadelphia Museum of Art; a civic leader in Philadelphia, he was called the quintessential Philadelphian. Her maternal grandfather, Colonel Robert L. Montgomery, went into finance to "replenish the family coffers" and founded the investment firm Janney Montgomery Scott. The Montgomery family magazine states that no American family can claim a more distinguished or ancient lineage than theirs, including an ancestor who is claimed to have commanded an advance division of the Norman army at Hastings in 1066. Her great-grandfather, Thomas A. Scott, helped build the Pennsylvania Railroad from a "struggling experiment" into what was then the largest corporation in the world, twice over; another ancestor, Horace Binney, served in Congress and was known for his public speeches as well as the founding of the Hasty Pudding Club at Harvard.

Scott grew up on Ardrossan, an 800-acre estate on the Philadelphia Main Line. She lived there until age 14, when her father transplanted the family to England. Her family eventually returned to Ardrossan to live, but she never did. He had been appointed special assistant to the ambassador to England, Walter Annenberg, a fellow Main Liner. She continued her education at an all-girls boarding school in the countryside.

She attended Harvard University, graduating in 1977, describing her time there as a turning point in her life. She reports that she had "a very good time," finding it "nice to be with men," meeting a different crowd, including radicals, and experiencing the intellectual environment. She began her writing career there "on almost a whim." She wrote for The Harvard Crimson, describing it as her main activity while in school. She also wrote for The Real Paper, a weekly alternative, and continued writing for it after graduation.

== Writing career ==
=== Journalism ===
After applying to 72 newspapers, she became a reporter for The Record, in Bergen County, New Jersey. After five years there, she landed a job with The Los Angeles Times' San Diego desk. She moved to California; being there was a new experience for her, and she loved everything about it. Scott met her husband there, "a surfer—a real Southern California guy." She was later transferred to the Los Angeles office, where she covered medicine and politics. Later, with her husband and two children, she moved to New York City and their New York desk. While in New York she left the L.A. Times and joined The New York Times where she worked 14 years (1994–2008) as a reporter on the metropolitan desk and the culture desk, covering race, class, and demographic changes.

Scott contributed to the "most striking feature" of the NYT's coverage of 9/11. Working with Christine Kay, a metro desk editor, she proposed the idea of writing essays about the individuals lost in the attack. Enlisting her colleagues, Scott got the project started three days after the attack. This led to 2310 thumbnail profiles that appeared in the NYT for months, and later collected in a 555-page book, Portraits of Grief. The style of each essay was impressionistic rather than a telegraphic obituary style. This was needed to help the readers see the victims as real people.

=== Biographer ===
On first learning about Barack Obama's mother, Scott felt that the usual representation of her as a "white woman from Kansas" an oversimplification and missed an extraordinary life story. In 2008, she took a leave from The Times to write a fuller story. The resulting 200 interviews over two and a half years led to the publication of A Singular Woman: The Untold Story of Barack Obama's Mother. The book was a bestseller, runner-up for the 2012 PEN/Jacqueline Bograd Weld Award for Biography, and one of Time Magazine's top ten of nonfiction books for 2011.

Her second book, The Beneficiary: Fortune, Misfortune and the Story of My Father looked at the world that shaped her father and "explored the weight of inheritance, the tenacity of addiction, and the power of buried secrets." Her father wrote diaries for over 40 years; Scott inherited these when he died of alcoholic cirrhosis in 2005. She lays bare her family history of suicide, generations of alcoholism, extramarital affairs, absent parents and her own father's struggle with alcoholism and depression; What tied it all together was a collection of grandiose houses that were "completely impractical." Scott felt her father was trapped by the "emotional heft" of his inheritance. She is saddened by her father's only feeble attempts to deal with alcohol and depression; and, his lack of forthrightness in discussing these problems with the family. She is less saddened by his infidelity, which was common in the family. She notes that fidelity in a long marriage is not for everybody; she views infidelity not as a character flaw, but as a character fact. The book was a New York Times notable book of 2019 and was on NPR's best books of 2019 list.

== Personal ==
Scott was married to Bill Ritter, a television news anchor. They were together for 19 years and had two children. In 2005, while married, a relationship between Scott and Joseph Lelyveld, former executive editor of The New York Times, became public. Scott was his partner for 19 years until his death in 2024.
