= Toni at Random =

2025 biography by Dana A. Williams

Toni at Random: The Iconic Writer's Legendary Editorship
- Author: Dana A. Williams
- Genre: Biography
- Publisher: Amistad
- Publication date: June 17, 2025
- Pages: 368
- ISBN: 978-0063011977

Toni at Random: The Iconic Writer's Legendary Editorship is a 2025 biography by Dana A. Williams published by Amistad Press. Through "interviews, archival research, and correspondence", the book traces a history of Toni Morrison working as an editor at Random House from 1967 to 1983, during which time she edited numerous important Black authors, including Angela Davis, Toni Cade Bambara, and Barbara Chase-Riboud.

== Background ==
In the 1960s, during the civil rights movement, Morrison joined Random House as an editor, after spending ten years as an English professor at Texas Southern University and Howard University.

During her time at Random House, she edited anthologies such as Contemporary African Literature and The Black Book, as worked with writers and activists including Lucille Clifton and Huey P. Newton. While working as an editor in the 1960s, '70s, and '80s, Morrison was also writing her own novels, including The Bluest Eye (1970) and Sula (1973), which brought her national acclaim.

In September 2005, Williams interviewed Morrison about her career as an editor, and discussed several books that Morrison had edited. At the time, Morrison was "celebrated worldwide for her novels yet virtually unknown for her groundbreaking work as an editor at Random House."

== Critical reception ==
Toni at Random received positive reviews from critics, who praised the book's detailed account of Morrison's editorship.

In a starred review, Publishers Weekly called the biography "a triumphant account of an underexplored aspect of Morrison's influence on American literature." Kirkus Reviews described the book as a "well-researched biographical study."

In 2022, Henry Louis Gates Jr. stated that Morrison's hiring at Random House was "probably the single most important moment in the transformation of the relationship of Black writers to white publishers." Of Gates' claim, Clint Smith wrote in The Atlantic that "Williams's meticulous and intimate account of Morrison’s editorial tenure backs up the rhetoric."

The Chicago Review of Books concluded that "Toni at Random is an edifying look at a beloved creator’s work as not only a writer, but a champion of writers. What it reveals is not meant to overturn, but to sharpen the picture of Toni Morrison we carry in our minds. Ultimately, it confirms that she did indeed love what she, in all her words and works, professed to."

Farah Jasmine Griffin called the biography "meticulously researched" and an introduction to Morrison not merely as a writer but an editor "who shaped American publishing by introducing a generation of new voices and topics to the reading public."
