= The Next Decade (book) =

2010 book by George Friedman

- Cover of the first edition
- Author: George Friedman
- Language: English
- Publication date: 2010
- Publication place: United States
- Media type: Print
- ISBN: 0-385-53294-6

The Next Decade is a 2010 speculative nonfiction book by George Friedman, who addresses the United States' relationships with other countries and the state of the world in general throughout the 2010s.

The main theme of the book is how the American administrations of the 2010s will need to create regional power balances, some of which have been disturbed. Friedman conceptualizes America's successful management of world affairs not by directly enforcing countries, but by creating competing relationships, which offset one another, in the world's different regions. For example, in the past, Iraq balanced Iran, and currently Japan balances China. Friedman asserts this is the decade where the US as a power must mature to manage its power and balance as an unintended empire and republic.

== Arguments of the book ==
=== Europe ===
Friedman argues that confrontation between Russia and NATO, particularly the United States, is inevitable, and that in particular, the US must ally with Poland and try to block an accommodation between Germany and Russia. He argues that the US must essentially abandon the Baltic states and Georgia, as they are liabilities rather than assets, and allow Russia to reassert its influence in exchange for maximum concessions from Russia, allowing Turkey to counterbalance Russia in the Caucasus. According to Friedman, the new confrontation will be nothing like the Cold War, as Russia is vulnerable and cannot sustain a major role in international affairs in the long run due to its population and infrastructural problems.

=== Middle East ===
Friedman advocates that the United States draw back from Israel, which is strategically secure, fully capable of surviving on its own, and is no longer heavily dependent on the US, and slightly re-orient towards Arab states to create a balance of power. He also advocates a deal with Iran which would essentially allow it a secure sphere of influence in the region and an alliance with Turkey to counterbalance Iran and Israel.

Friedman argues that while Israel's position is secure due to a balance of power between its Arab neighbors, including alliances with some of them, the main danger it faces is intervention of or alienation from major powers over the Israeli–Palestinian conflict, and that it must manage the conflict prudently.

=== Asia ===
Friedman argues that China faces long-term economic problems due to its having a producer economy that cannot be sustained by its impoverished population, and as other sources of cheap labor arise, it will have to increase internal security, and tax its wealthy coastal regions to transfer the resources to its impoverished interior. The Chinese government will end up being preoccupied with trying to hold the country together and prevent fragmentation, and in the long run, China risks fragmentation into autonomous regions.

Meanwhile, Japan will continue its strategic relationship with the United States. At the same time, its aging and declining population, coupled with the social inability of its population to tolerate large-scale immigration, will mean that it will increasingly exploit labor markets in other parts of the world, even in China. According to Friedman, the United States will have to check Japan's rising power, and will do this by providing economic benefits to China to ensure it stays stable and can check Japanese power, in addition to allying with South Korea, and give it generous economic benefits and financial assistance to absorb North Korea when reunification inevitably comes so as to cement ties, while maintaining a cordial relationship with Japan and continue guaranteeing its access to raw materials through the sea lanes to prevent a massive Japanese military buildup.

The United States will also need to build up strategic alliances with South Korea, Australia, and Singapore to secure its domination of the western Pacific.

In addition, the United States will withdraw from Afghanistan, and the Taliban will regain control of the country. US support for Pakistan will continue. Pakistan will contain the Taliban and counter a rising India. In particular, US military aid to Pakistan will continue, keeping Indian military planners focused on their army and air force rather than the navy, preventing India from building sufficient sea power to replace the US Navy as the dominant naval force in the region.

=== Africa ===
The book argues that Africa will continue to suffer from wars due to the irrationality of its borders, which were drawn by colonial powers, which do not take into account tribal and ethnic loyalties. According to Friedman, Africa will gradually reshape itself into a continent of stable nations, including a few major powers, and that the best policy is to simply leave Africa alone and provide humanitarian assistance, and allow the continent's borders to be gradually rearranged through warfare.

=== The Americas ===
Friedman argues that the United States is secure in its hemisphere, with the only immediate pressing issues being the flow of drugs and illegal immigrants from Mexico, which will continue, and relations with Cuba, which the United States will have to accommodate and cut a deal with. Other than that, what happens in the Americas is of marginal importance, although Brazil has the potential to be a future challenger to the United States.
