= The Hairstons =

1999 biography by Henry Wiencek

The Hairstons: An American Family in Black and White
- Author: Henry Wiencek
- Language: English
- Genre: Nonfiction
- Publisher: St. Martin's Press
- Publication date: 15 January 1999
- Publication place: United States
- Media type: Print (hardcover)
- Pages: 400 pp
- ISBN: 978-0-312-19277-8

The Hairstons: An American Family in Black and White, written by historian Henry Wiencek, was published in 1999 by St. Martin's Press, and won the National Book Critics Circle Award in Biography.
