= Henry Wiencek =

American historian

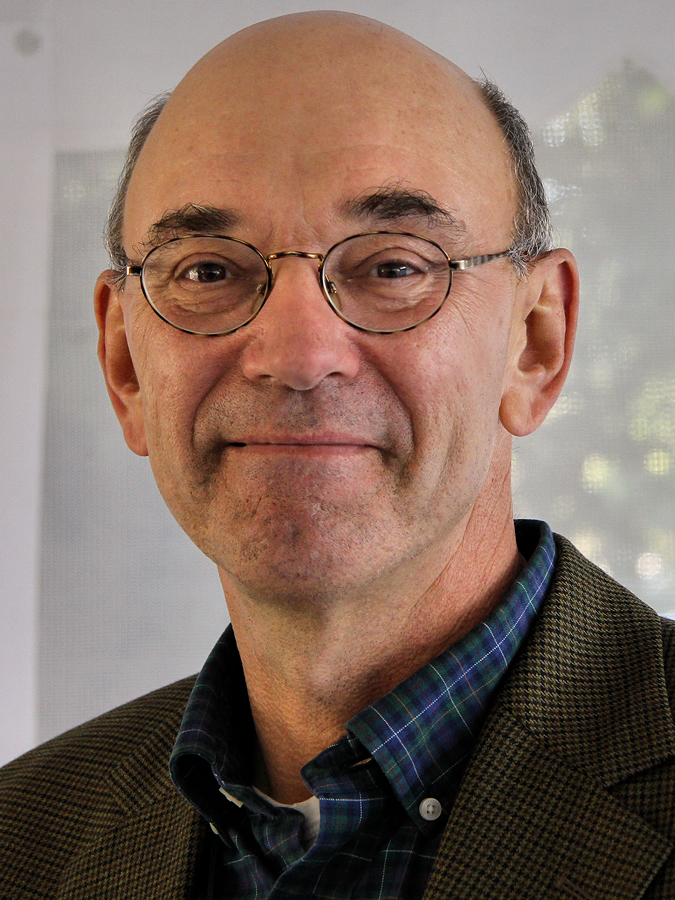
- Wiencek at the 2012 Texas Book Festival.
- Born: 1952 (age 73–74); Dorchester, Massachusetts, U.S.
- Education: Boston College High School
- Alma mater: Yale University
- Spouse: Donna M. Lucey
- Writing career
- Genre: Non-fiction
- Notable awards: National Book Critics Circle Award
- Website: henrywiencek.wordpress.com

Henry Wiencek (born 1952) is an American journalist, historian and editor whose work has encompassed historically significant architecture, the Founding Fathers, various topics relating to slavery, and the Lego company. In 1999, The Hairstons: An American Family in Black and White, a biographical history which chronicles the racially intertwined Hairston clan of the noted Cooleemee Plantation House, won the National Book Critics Circle Award for biography.

Wiencek has come to be particularly associated with his work on George Washington and slavery as a result of his book, An Imperfect God: George Washington, His Slaves, and the Creation of America, which earned him the Los Angeles Times Book Award for history. Partly as a result of this book, Wiencek was named the first-ever Washington College Patrick Henry Fellow, inaugurating a program designed to provide writing fellowships for nationally prominent historians.

In 2003, Wiencek was appointed to the board of trustees for the Library of Virginia.

In June 2010, Texas A&M University Press released The Moodys of Galveston and Their Mansion, a history of the prominent Galveston family and their celebrated home. Wiencek originally compiled the manuscript after the Moody Mansion opened to the public as a museum, education center, and location for community gatherings in 1991.

== Early life and education ==
Wiencek was born and raised in Dorchester, Massachusetts. He attended Boston College High School, where he was valedictorian. He earned an undergraduate degree from Yale University in 1974 with a double major in Russian Literature and Literary Theory.

== Career ==
Soon after graduating, Wiencek moved to New York City, where he worked for Time-Life, editing and writing for its publications.

== Personal life ==
Wiencek is married to Donna M. Lucey, who is also an American historian. Wiencek has resided in Charlottesville, Virginia since 1992, where he works in his home. He and his wife spent the 2008-2009 academic year in residence in a restored colonial house at Chestertown, Maryland in fulfillment of his Patrick Henry Fellowship duties.

== Bibliography ==
- Stan and Gus: Art, Ardor, and the Friendship that Built the Gilded Age. New York: Farrar, Straus and Giroux, 2025
- Master of the Mountain: Thomas Jefferson and His Slaves. New York: Farrar, Straus and Giroux. 2012.
- The Moodys of Galveston and Their Mansion, 2010
- An Imperfect God: George Washington, His Slaves, and the Creation of America, 2003
- The Hairstons: An American Family in Black and White, 1999
- National Geographic Guide to America's Great Houses, 1999
- Virginia & the Capital Region Smithsonian Guides (Smithsonian Guides to Historic America), 1998
- Smithsonian Guides to Historic America: Southern New England - Massachusetts, Connecticut, Rhode Island (Smithsonian Guides to Historic America), 1998
- Old Houses, 1995
- Plantations of the Old South (Great American Homes), 1990
- The Smithsonian Guide to Historic America - Southern New England (The Smithsonian guide to historic America), 1989
- World of Lego Toys, 1987
- The Lords of Japan (Treasures of The World), 1982
