= The Black Count: Glory, Revolution, Betrayal, and the Real Count of Monte Cristo =

Book by Tom Reiss

- Author: Tom Reiss
- Cover artist: Eric White (jacket design); Sam Weber (illustration)
- Language: English
- Subject: Thomas-Alexandre Dumas; History of France
- Genre: Non-fiction; biography
- Publisher: Crown Publishing Group
- Publication date: September 18, 2012
- Publication place: United States
- Media type: Print, digital, audio
- Pages: 432 (hardcover)
- ISBN: 978-0307382467
- OCLC: 793503467
- Dewey Decimal: 944.04092 B
- LC Class: DC146.D83R46 2012

The Black Count: Glory, Revolution, Betrayal, and the Real Count of Monte Cristo is a 2012 biography of General Thomas-Alexandre Dumas written by Tom Reiss. The book presents the life and career of Dumas as a soldier and officer during the French Revolution, as well as his military service in Italy during the French Revolutionary Wars and later in Egypt under Napoleon. Reiss offers insight into slavery and the life of a man of mixed race during the French Colonial Empire. He also reveals how Dumas's son – author Alexandre Dumas – viewed his father, who served as the inspiration for some of his novels, including The Count of Monte Cristo (1844) and The Three Musketeers (1844).

The Black Count won the 2013 Pulitzer Prize for Biography or Autobiography and the PEN/Jacqueline Bograd Weld Award, among other awards and honors.

== Summary ==
The Black Count presents the life of the French General Thomas-Alexandre Dumas, who served as the inspiration for the 1844 book The Count of Monte Cristo written by his son Alexandre Dumas. Thomas-Alexandre Dumas, also known as Thomas-Alexandre Davy de la Pailleterie, was born in Jérémie, Saint-Domingue (Haiti) in 1762, the son of the Marquis Alexandre Antoine Davy de la Pailleterie and Marie-Cessette Dumas, his Haitian slave. In addition to being the father of French novelist Alexandre Dumas, he was the grandfather of playwright Alexandre Dumas fils, known for La Dame aux Camélias, the source for Giuseppe Verdi's La traviata.

Dumas was born the son of a renegade French nobleman and his black slave in 1762 in the French sugar colony of Saint Domingue (the future Haiti); at the time of his birth, his father was living on the run from the royal authorities and from the boy's uncle, a rich planter who shipped sugar and slaves out of a Haitian area called "Monte Cristo". When Dumas was 14, his father sold him and his three siblings into slavery in Port-au-Prince, in order to raise funds to return to France and reclaim his inheritance and estate. Some months later, the father repurchased his son and had him sent to France, leaving the siblings in Haiti, where they remained slaves.

As a teenager in Paris, Thomas-Alexandre Davy de la Pailleterie was recognized as a member of the French aristocracy. He attended school and received an education in literature, sword fighting, military arts, and the fundamentals of 18th-century French aristocracy. When he was 24 he lost his income because of his father's lavishing funds on a new wife. He enlisted in the French military as a dragoon, taking his mother's surname Dumas and shortening his forename to Alex, and rose quickly in the ranks. During the French Revolution, he led a group of mixed-race swordsmen called the "Free Legion of Americans," nicknamed the "Black Legion," and he received citations from the new French Republic for various daring, risky operations.

As he was given command of more troops, Dumas's military actions and victories included opening the glacier passes of the high Alps, which provided access for the military in their ongoing battle with the Austrian Empire. When he was 32, he was promoted to the rank of General-in-Chief of the French Army of the Alps, responsible for commanding 53,000 troops. Dumas is the highest-ranking person of color to have served in a continental European army, and the first to become divisional general and General-in-Chief of the French army. He was the highest-ranking black commander ever in any white military until 1989, when American Colin Powell became a four-star general, the closest United States equivalent of Général d'Armée, Dumas's highest rank. In 1798 General Dumas went to Egypt as the Cavalry Commander of the French Expeditionary Army of the Orient; on the march from Alexandria to Cairo, Dumas publicly confronted Napoleon about the motives of the expedition. Dumas departed for France shortly thereafter but was caught in a sinking vessel in the Mediterranean and forced to put ashore in hostile territory, where he was taken hostage and kept in a dungeon for over two years without clearly understanding the motives or identity of his captors.

Released from the dungeon in 1802, he returned to France. Napoleon had seized power and passed the Law of 20 May 1802 – which effectively restored slavery, which had been abolished in 1794 in all the French colonies following the Revolution. And within France, Napoleon's series of harsh racial laws meant black and mixed-race officers were effectively demoted to chain-gang labor, the integrated schools of Paris were closed, and even General Dumas's marriage to a white Frenchwoman was made illegal. General Dumas raised his son, the future novelist Alexandre Dumas, in a house that was officially too close to Paris for a black-skinned person to live in; the general was forced to write a humiliating letter asking for a dispensation of this housing law. Dumas never received another military command, despite repeated requests for one. The debilitation from his previous two-year dungeon imprisonment in Italy led to his early death in 1806, at the age of 43.

== Research ==
In preparation for the writing and publication of The Black Count, Reiss undertook a comprehensive study of colonial Haiti, Revolutionary France, medieval Egypt, and political and social unrest in Italy. He also visited the dungeon in Taranto, where Dumas was held from 1799 through 1801 by allies of King Ferdinand IV of Naples during his war with France. Reiss spent two years in search of a publicly commissioned statue of Dumas that was erected in 1913 at the Place Malesherbes (now known as the Place du Général-Catroux) in Paris. While the statue had been displayed for over 30 years, alongside statues of his son and grandson, research revealed that it was melted down by German military forces during World War II.

Reiss's additional research included visiting the Musée Alexandre Dumas in Villers-Cotterêts, France, which is devoted to the archives and conservation of the works of Dumas's son, the novelist. Reiss learned of the possible existence of a long-forgotten cache of materials and documents, but the librarian unexpectedly died without recording the combination to the safe. Reiss persuaded a town official to "blow open" the safe, revealing a collection of records that proved valuable to presenting the life and work of Dumas.

== Reception ==
On September 15, 2012, just prior to publication, Reiss was interviewed by NPR staff member Scott Simon. Simon asked Reiss why, prior to this biography, there had been little mention of Dumas's various heroic military exploits both during the French Revolution and afterwards throughout western Europe. Reiss responded with a brief overview of Napoleon's relationship with Dumas, who came to prominence during a time in history when his race was considered by the French as exotic and desirable. Dumas was seen as a physically contrasting presence to Napoleon, which seemingly threatened the leader. Reiss remarked that Napoleon took umbrage to Dumas, who stood over six feet tall and was "incredibly dashing and physically brilliant". Napoleon also took offense when Dumas publicly opposed his military expedition during a 1798 failed French attempt to conquer Egypt and the Levant, in which Dumas commanded the French cavalry forces. Napoleon never forgave him for his public defiance, and punished him afterwards.

This retaliation played out as follows: In spring 1799, while returning to France from Egypt, Dumas was captured and imprisoned in Taranto in hopes of a ransom from Napoleon. Napoleon instead used Dumas's capture as an opportunity to solidify his dictatorship throughout France. When Dumas was released after two years, Napoleon had risen to power and had summarily reinstated slavery and eliminated civil rights protection – resulting in a whitewashing of Dumas's military heroics during the Revolution. Physically incapacitated from the captivity, Dumas died in early 1806. Although his son was less than four years old at the time, he retained memories of his father, later honoring his legacy through his literary works The Count of Monte Cristo and The Three Musketeers.

On September 19, 2012, NPR's Drew Toal reviewed the book, reiterating Simon's astonishment at the impact that Dumas made in life and literature, and calling the book and life of Dumas "fascinating". He compared the historical influence of Dumas with his offspring, stating he was "larger-than-life" and that "the sword was mightier than the pen" for this father of a famous novelist. While acknowledging the military impact that Dumas made in France, along with the inspiration his life provided as a backdrop in literature throughout history, Toal was surprised at the level of enthusiasm the author expressed about his subject. "I like to think of him as history's ultimate underdog," Reiss had explained in his earlier NPR interview. "He's a black man, born into slavery, and then he rises higher than any black man rose in a white society before our own time. He became a four-star general and challenges Napoleon, and he did it all 200 years ago, at the height of slavery." In the end, Toal summed up his review, stating, "Despite Reiss' sometimes overblown regard, it's difficult to argue with him. That a former slave could rise on his merits so far, so fast some seven decades before Lincoln issued the Emancipation Proclamation is a truly amazing story, one that needs no literary embellishment."

On September 28, 2012, Nigel Jones in the UK's The Guardian characterized Reiss, the author of "enthralling biographies", as "more a literary gumshoe detective than a conventional biographer". He noted that at a small municipal library in rural France, Reiss uncovered a trove of documents and letters which shed light on Dumas's life. Jones concluded his review by stating that, like Dumas's son, "Reiss has written a swashbuckling tale of his own."

In The Boston Globe, Madison Smartt Bell summarized the book. He lauded Reiss, stating that he revealed details about Dumas and about 18th-century French racial policies which had previously been widely unknown. He noted the comprehensiveness of the book, which effectively uses the revolutions in France and Haiti, along with the rise of Napoleon, as a backdrop to the biography. Bell commended Reiss' research and writing, which was carried out "with remarkable verve".

The Christian Science Monitor published a review by David Holahan on November 21, 2012, in which he spoke of the comprehensive coverage offered in the book. Holahan called The Black Count a "remarkable and almost compulsively researched account" and stated "the author spent a decade on the case, and it shows".

On April 15, 2013, The Black Count was honored with the Pulitzer Prize for Biography or Autobiography. Jury members included Elmaz Abinader, professor of English at Mills College in Oakland, California; Michael Kazin, professor of history at Georgetown University; and Alan Brinkley, Allan Nevins Professor of History at Columbia University, where he also served as University Provost from 2003 to 2009. In a joint statement following their review and pronouncement of The Black Count as the 2013 Pulitzer Prize winner, the jury stated that the real-life inspiration for the Count of Monte Cristo, presented "a compelling story of a forgotten swashbuckling hero". Following the announcement of the Pulitzer Prize winners, Reiss reflected on the honor, stating, "For me the great thrill of this book is that I pulled somebody out of the pages of fiction, who was forgotten about in fact, and showed his exploits to be a true story. It's swashbuckling, but for a purpose. He was the highest-ranking black leader in a white society until modern times and really a very serious revolutionary."

In 2014, the book was optioned by John Legend's film company Get Lifted for production as a movie and was to be directed by Cary Fukunaga (True Detective).

== Honors and awards ==
Since its September 18, 2012 publication, The Black Count has received honors and awards throughout the world. In November 2012 the book was chosen as the BBC "Book of the Week" and broadcast as a five-part radio series presented on BBC Radio 4. The New York Times named it one of the 100 most notable books of 2012, while TIME included it in their list of Top 10 Nonfiction Books of 2012, and NPR listed it as one of the Best 5 Biographies of 2012. Amazon.com chose it as one of the "10 Best Books of 2012" in the Biographies and Memoirs category. In December 2012, it was nominated for an NAACP Image Award for Outstanding Literary Work – Biography/Autobiography. On April 15, 2013, The Black Count was honored with the Pulitzer Prize for Biography or Autobiography. The book also won the 2013 PEN/Jacqueline Bograd Weld Award. In 2013, it was a finalist for the National Book Critics Circle Award (Biography), the Plutarch Award for Best Biography, and shortlisted for the American Library in Paris Book Award.
