= Dana A. Williams =

University dean and African-American literature scholar

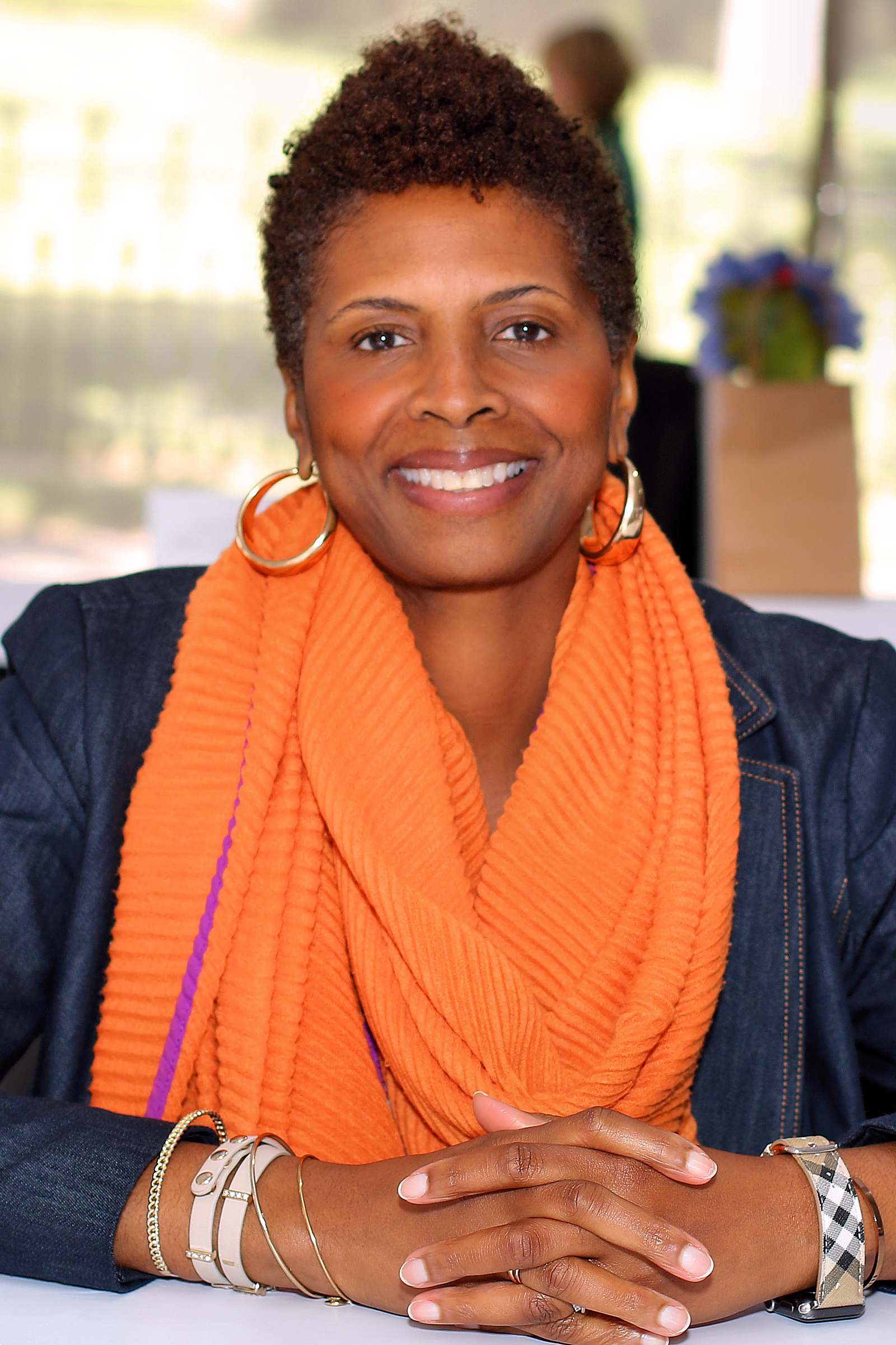
- Williams at the 2025 Texas Book Festival
- Education: Grambling State University; Howard University
- Occupations: Scholar of African-American literature, and university administrator
- Employer: Howard University

Dana A. Williams is a scholar of African-American literature and university administrator. She is professor of the English at Howard University and the former chair of that department, following Dr. Eleanor W. Traylor. In 2021, Williams became Dean of Graduate Studies at Howard. She is the former president of the College Language Association, the oldest and largest professional organization for collegiate faculty of color who teach languages and literatures. She also served as president of the Modern Language Association, making her the first person to serve as president of both humanities organizations.

== Education ==
Williams has a B.A. degree in English from Grambling State University (Louisiana), received in 1993, an M.A. (1995) from Howard University, and Ph.D. in African-American literature from Howard (1999).

== Career ==
While a graduate student, Williams published Contemporary African American Female Playwrights: An Annotated Bibliography in 1999, reviewed in Feminist Collections as "a service to theatrical producers and play enthusiasts alike" by locating more than sixty African-American female writers with works published between 1959 and 1997—a group given minimal space in anthologies and other compilations. In Modern Drama, Kathy A. Perkins noted that the work's focus on African-American women playwrights was the first contribution of its kind, and said: "Not since the publication of Bernard Peterson's Contemporary Black American Playwrights and Their Plays (1988) has there been such a valuable resource in this field."

After completing her PhD, Williams was a Ford Foundation postdoctoral fellowship at Northwestern University in 1999. She taught at Louisiana State University for four years, then returned to teach at Howard in 2003. In 2005, she published In the Light of Likeness—Transformed: The Literary Art of Leon Forrest, a study of African-American fiction writer Leon Forrest, focusing on his use of black cultural traditions as well as his place in the Afro-modernist literary school. In 2008, she had a faculty fellowship at the John Hope Franklin Humanities Institute at Duke University. Williams went on to become professor and chair of the English department at Howard University.

Williams was also tapped to serve on the National Council on the Humanities, nominated by President Barack Obama in 2016. She is on the advisory board of the Hurston/Wright Foundation, the American Council of Learned Societies, the Furious Flower Poetry Center, and the Toni Morrison Society.

Her most recent book is Toni at Random: The Iconic Writer's Legendary Editorship, published by Amistad/Harper in June 2025.

== Books ==
- Contemporary African American Female Playwrights: An Annotated Bibliography (Greenwood, 1999)
- co-ed. with Sandra G. Shannon, August Wilson and Black Aesthetics (Palgrave-MacMillan, 2004)
- In the Light of Likeness—Transformed: The Literary Art of Leon Forrest (Ohio State University Press, 2005)
- ed. African American Humor, Irony, and Satire: Ishmael Reed, Satirically Speaking (Cambridge Scholars, 2007)
- ed. Conversations with Leon Forrest (University Press of Mississippi, 2007)
- ed. Contemporary African American Fiction: New Critical Essays (Ohio State University Press, 2009)
- Toni at Random: The Iconic Writers' Legendary Editorship (Amistad, 2025)
