= A Singular Woman =

2011 book by Janny Scott

A Singular Woman: The Untold Story of Barack Obama's Mother
- First edition
- Author: Janny Scott
- Language: English
- Subject: The Life of Barack Obama's mother Ann Durham
- Genre: Biographical, non fiction
- Publisher: Riverhead Books
- Publication place: United States
- Media type: book
- Pages: 384

A Singular Woman: The Untold Story of Barack Obama's Mother is a 2011 book by former The New York Times journalist Janny Scott. It is a biography of Ann Dunham, the mother of U.S. President Barack Obama.

A Singular Woman was nominated for the Goodreads Choice Award for Best History & Biography (2011) and runner-up for the PEN/Jacqueline Bograd Weld Award (2012).
