= Los Angeles Times Book Prize =

American literary awards

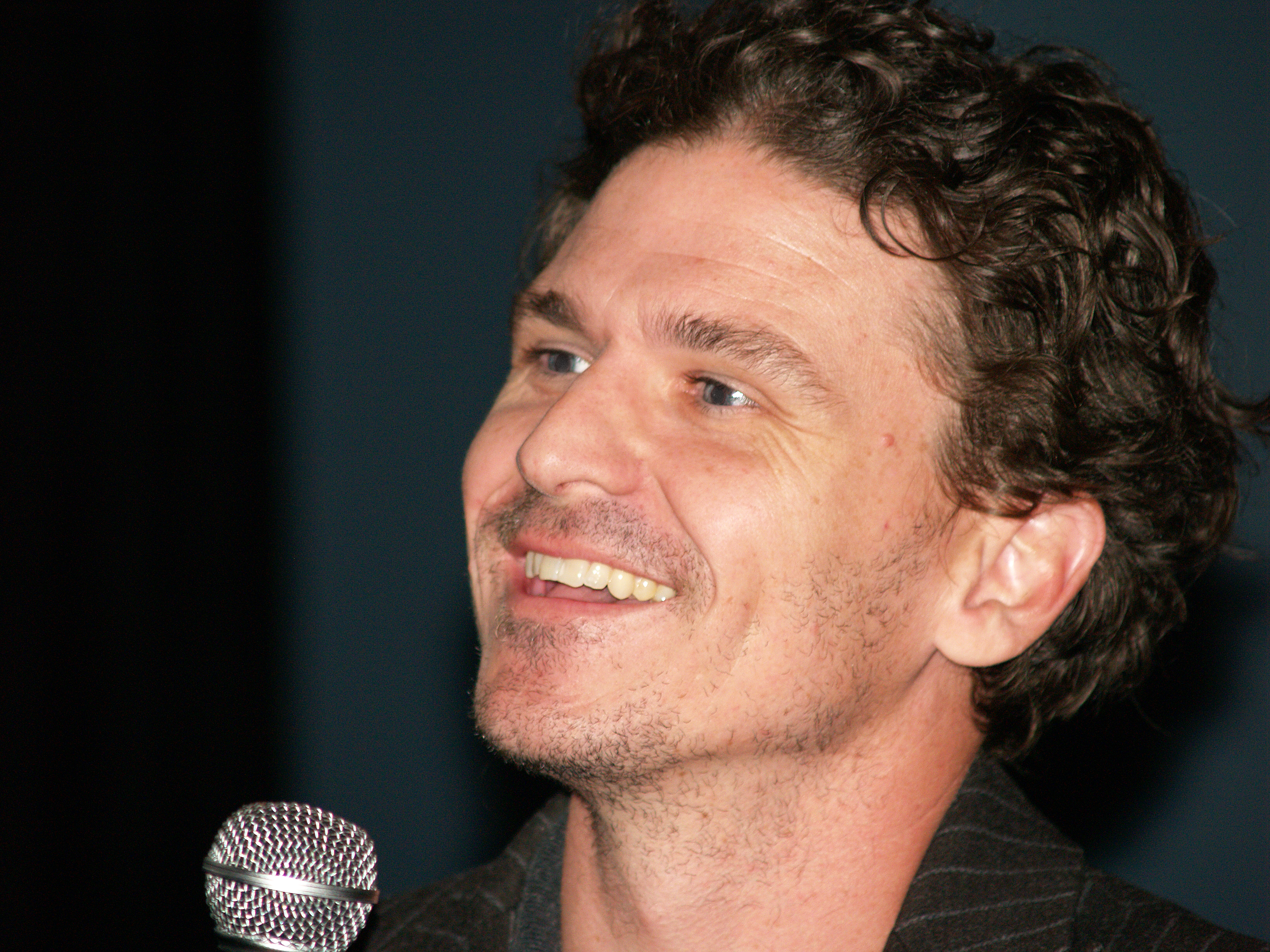
David Eggers, double winner of the Book Prize in 2009

Since 1980, the Los Angeles Times has awarded a set of annual book prizes. The Los Angeles Times Book Prize currently has nine categories: biography, current interest, fiction, first fiction (the Art Seidenbaum Award added in 1991), history, mystery/thriller (category added in 2000), poetry, science and technology (category added in 1989), and young adult fiction (category added in 1998). In addition, the Robert Kirsch Award is presented annually to a living author with a substantial connection to the American West. It is named in honor of Robert Kirsch, the Los Angeles Times book critic from 1952 until his death in 1980 whose idea it was to establish the book prizes.

The Book Prize program was founded by Art Seidenbaum, a Los Angeles Times book editor from 1978 to 1985. An award named for Seidenbaum was added a year after his death in 1990. Works are eligible during the year of their first US publication in English, and may be written originally in languages other than English. The author of each winning book and the Kirsch Award recipient receives a citation and $500. The prizes are presented the day before the annual Los Angeles Times Festival of Books.

== Winners ==
=== Art Seidenbaum Award for First Fiction ===
The Art Seidenbaum Award for First Fiction winners
Year	Author	Title	Publisher	Ref.
1991	David Wong Louie	Pangs of Love	Alfred A. Knopf	
1992	Darryl Pinckney	High Cotton	Farrar, Straus and Giroux	
1993	Paul Kafka	Love	Houghton Mifflin	
1994	Martin M. Šimecka	The Year of the Frog	Louisiana State University Press	
1995	Mark Merlis	American Studies	Houghton Mifflin	
1996	Mark Behr	The Smell of Apples	St. Martin's Press	
1997	Carolyn Ferrell	Don't Erase Me: Stories	Houghton Mifflin	
1998	C. S. Godshalk	Kalimantaan	Henry Holt	
1999	Elizabeth Strout	Amy and Isabelle	Random House	
2000	Pankaj Mishra	The Romantics	Random House	
2001	Rachel Seiffert	The Dark Room	Pantheon Books	
2002	Arthur Phillips	Prague	Random House	
2003	Mark Haddon	The Curious Incident of the Dog in the Night-Time	Doubleday	
2004	Lorraine Adams	Harbor	Alfred A. Knopf	
2005	Uzodinma Iweala	Beasts of No Nation	HarperCollins	
2006	Alice Greenway	White Ghost Girls	Black Cat / Grove/Atlantic	
2007	Dinaw Mengestu	The Beautiful Things That Heaven Bears	Riverhead	
2008	Zoë Ferraris	Finding Nouf	Houghton Mifflin Harcourt	
2009	Philipp Meyer	American Rust	Spiegel & Grau	
2010	Peter Bognanni	The House of Tomorrow	Amy Einhorn Books/G.P. Putnam's Sons	
2011	Ismet Prcic	Shards	Black Cat / Grove/Atlantic	
2012	Maggie Shipstead	Seating Arrangements	Alfred A. Knopf	
2013	NoViolet Bulawayo	We Need New Names	Reagan Arthur Books	
2014	Valeria Luiselli with Christina MacSweeney (trans.)	Faces in the Crowd	Coffee House Press	
2015	Chigozie Obioma	The Fisherman	Little, Brown and Company	
2016	Nathan Hill	The Nix	Alfred A. Knopf	
2017	Jenny Zhang	Sour Heart	Random House	
2018	Nafissa Thompson-Spires	Heads of the Colored People	Atria/37 Ink	
2019	Namwali Serpell	The Old Drift	Hogarth Press	
2020	Deesha Philyaw	The Secret Lives of Church Ladies	West Virginia University Press	
2021	Jackie Polzin	Brood	Doubleday	
2022	Aamina Ahmad	The Return of Faraz Ali	Hodder & Stoughton	
2023	Shannon Sanders	Company: Stories	Graywolf Press	
2024	Jiaming Tang	Cinema Love	Dutton	
2025	Justin Haynes	Ibis: A Novel	Abrams Books	

=== Biography ===
Los Angeles Times Book Prize for Biography winners
Year	Author	Title	Publisher	Ref.
1981	David McCullough	Mornings on Horseback	Simon & Schuster	
1982	Gay Wilson Allen	Waldo Emerson: A Biography	Viking	
1983	Seymour Hersh	The Price of Power: Kissinger in the Nixon White House	Summit Books	
1984	Ernst Pawel	The Nightmare of Reason	Farrar, Straus and Giroux	
1985	Michael Scammell	Solzhenitsyn	W.W. Norton & Company	
1986	Maynard Mack	Alexander Pope: A Life	W.W. Norton & Company	
1987	Kenneth S. Lynn	Hemingway	Simon & Schuster	
1988	Brenda Maddox	Nora: The Real Life of Molly Bloom	Houghton Mifflin	
1989	Tobias Wolff	This Boy's Life: A Memoir	Atlantic Monthly Press	
1990	Geoffrey C. Ward	A First-Class Temperament: The Emergence of Franklin Roosevelt	Harper & Row	
1991	T. H. Watkins	Righteous Pilgrim: The Life and Times of Harold L. Ickes, 1874–1952	Henry Holt	
1992	Blanche Wiesen Cook	Eleanor Roosevelt: Volume One, 1884–1933	Viking	
1993	John Mack Faragher	Daniel Boone: The Life and Legend of an American Pioneer	Henry Holt	
1994	Mikal Gilmore	Shot in the Heart	Doubleday	
1995	Doris Lessing	Under My Skin: Volume One of My Autobiography, to 1949	HarperCollins	
1996	Frank McCourt	Angela's Ashes: A Memoir	Scribner	
1997	Sam Tanenhaus	Whittaker Chambers: A Biography	Random House	
1998	A. Scott Berg	Lindbergh	G.P. Putnam's Sons	
1999	Judith Thurman	Secrets of the Flesh: A Life of Colette	Alfred A. Knopf	
2000	William J. Cooper, Jr.	Jefferson Davis, American	Alfred A. Knopf	
2001	Edmund Morris	Theodore Rex	Random House	
2002	Robert A. Caro	Master of the Senate: The Years of Lyndon Johnson, Vol. 3	Alfred A. Knopf	
2003	Neil Smith	American Empire: Roosevelt's Geographer and the Prelude to Globalization	University of California Press	
2004	Mark Stevens and Annalyn Swan	de Kooning: An American Master	Alfred A. Knopf	
2005	Hilary Spurling	Matisse the Master: A Life of Henri Matisse, the Conquest of Colour, 1909–1954	Alfred A. Knopf	
2006	Neal Gabler	Walt Disney: The Triumph of the American Imagination	Alfred A. Knopf	
2007	Simon Sebag Montefiore	Young Stalin	Alfred A. Knopf	
2008	Paula J. Giddings	Ida: A Sword Among Lions: Ida B. Wells and the Campaign Against Lynching	Amistad/HarperCollins	
2009	Linda Gordon	Dorothea Lange: A Life Beyond Limits	W.W. Norton & Company	
2010	Laura Hillenbrand	Unbroken: A World War II Story of Survival, Resilience, and Redemption	Random House	
2011	John A. Farrell	Clarence Darrow: Attorney for the Damned	Doubleday	
2012	Robert A. Caro	The Passage of Power: The Years of Lyndon Johnson	Alfred A. Knopf	
2013	Marie Arana	Bolivar: American Liberator	Simon & Schuster	
2014	Andrew Roberts	Napoleon: A Life	Viking	
2015	Hayden Herrera	Listening to Stone: The Art and Life of Isamu Noguchi	Farrar, Straus and Giroux	
2016	Volker Ullrich with Jefferson Chase (trans.)	Hitler: Ascent, 1889–1939	Alfred A. Knopf	
2017	Laura Walls	Henry David Thoreau: A Life	University of Chicago Press	
2018	David W. Blight	Frederick Douglass: Prophet of Freedom	Simon & Schuster	
2019	George Packer	Our Man: Richard Holbrooke and the End of the American Century	Alfred A. Knopf	
2020	William Souder	Mad at the World: A Life of John Steinbeck	W.W. Norton & Company	
2021	Paul Auster	Burning Boy: The Life and Work of Stephen Crane	Henry Holt & Company	
2022	Beverly Gage	G-Man: J. Edgar Hoover and the Making of the American Century	Viking Press	
2023	Gregg Hecimovich	The Life and Times of Hannah Crafts: The True Story of The Bondwoman’s Narrative	Ecco/HarperCollins	
2024	Laura Beers	Orwell's Ghosts: Wisdom and Warnings for the Twenty-First Century	W. W. Norton & Company	
2025	Ekow Eshun	The Strangers: Five Extraordinary Black Men and the Worlds That Made Them	HarperCollins	

=== Christopher Isherwood Prize for Autobiographical Prose ===
The Los Angeles Times – Christopher Isherwood Prize for Autobiographical Prose has been awarded in partnership with the Christopher Isherwood Foundation since April 2017 (for 2016).

The Christopher Isherwood Prize for Autobiographical Prose winners
Year	Author	Title	Publisher	Ref.
2016	Wesley Lowery	"They Can't Kill Us All": Ferguson, Baltimore, and a New Era in America's Racial Justice Movement	Little, Brown and Company	
2017	Benjamin Taylor	The Hue and Cry at Our House: A Year Remembered	Penguin Books	
2018	Kiese Laymon	Heavy: An American Memoir	Scribner Book Company	
2019	Emily Bernard	Black Is the Body: Stories from My Grandmother's Time, My Mother's Time, and Mine	Alfred A. Knopf	
2020	Andrew O'Hagan	Mayflies		
2021	Deborah Levy	Real Estate: A Living Autobiography	Bloomsbury	
2022	Javier Zamora	Solito: A Memoir.	Hogarth Press	
2023	Claire Dederer	Monsters: A Fan's Dilemma	Alfred A. Knopf	
2024	Emily Witt	Health and Safety: A Breakdown	Pantheon Books	
2025	Adam Ross	Playworld: A Novel	Alfred A. Knopf	

=== Current interest ===
Los Angeles Times Book Prize for Current Interest winners
Year	Author	Title	Publisher	Ref.
1980	Harrison Salisbury	Without Fear or Favor	New York Times Books	
1981	Jacobo Timerman	Prisoner without a Name, Cell without a Number	Alfred A. Knopf	
1982	Jonathan Schell	The Fate of the Earth	Alfred A. Knopf	
1983	Walker Percy	Lost in the Cosmos	Farrar, Straus and Giroux	
1984	Jane Jacobs	Cities and the Wealth of Nations	Random House	
1985	Robert N. Bellah, Richard Madsen, William M. Sullivan, Ann Swidler and Steven M. Tipton	Habits of the Heart: Individualism and Commitment in American Life	University of California Press	
1986	Joseph Lelyveld	Move Your Shadow: South Africa, Black and White	Times Books	
1987	Richard Dawkins	The Blind Watchmaker	W.W. Norton & Company	
1988	William Greider	Secrets of the Temple: How the Federal Reserve Runs the Country	Simon & Schuster	
1989	Taylor Branch	Parting the Waters: America in the King Years, 1954–1963	Simon & Schuster	
1990	O. B. Hardison, Jr.	Disappearing through the Skylight: Culture and Technology in the Twentieth Century	Viking	
1991	E. J. Dionne, Jr.	Why Americans Hate Politics: The Death of the Democratic Process	Simon & Schuster	
1992	Francis Fukuyama	The End of History and the Last Man	The Free Press	
1993	Peter Skerry	Mexican Americans: The Ambivalent Minority	The Free Press	
1994	Henry Kissinger	Diplomacy	Simon & Schuster	
1995	Gregory Howard Williams	Life on the Color Line: The True Story of a White Boy Who Discovered He Was Black	Dutton	
1996	Peter Maass	Love Thy Neighbor: A Story of War	Alfred A. Knopf	
1997	Anne Fadiman	The Spirit Catches You and You Fall Down: A Hmong Child, Her American Doctors, and the Collision of Two Cultures	Farrar, Straus and Giroux	
1998	Philip Gourevitch	We Wish to Inform You That Tomorrow We Will Be Killed with Our Families: Stories from Rwanda	Farrar, Straus and Giroux	
1999	Mitchell Duneier with Ovie Carter (photographer)	Sidewalk	Farrar, Straus and Giroux	
2000	Frances FitzGerald	Way Out There in the Blue: Reagan, Star Wars and the End of the Cold War	Simon & Schuster	
2001	Barbara Ehrenreich	Nickel and Dimed: On (Not) Getting by in America	Metropolitan Books / Henry Holt and Company	
2002	Judith Levine	Harmful to Minors: The Perils of Protecting Children from Sex	University of Minnesota Press	
2003	Ross Terrill	The New Chinese Empire - And What It Means for the United States	Basic Books	
2004	Evan Wright	Generation Kill: Devil Dogs, Iceman, Captain America and the New Face of American War	G.P. Putnam's Sons	
2005	Anthony Shadid	Night Draws Near: Iraq's People in the Shadow of America's War	Henry Holt	
2006	Ian Buruma	Murder in Amsterdam: The Death of Theo van Gogh and the Limits of Tolerance	Penguin Press	
2007	Elizabeth D. Samet	Soldier's Heart: Reading Literature Through Peace and War at West Point	Farrar, Straus and Giroux	
2008	Barton Gellman	Angler: The Cheney Vice Presidency	Penguin Press	
2009	Dave Eggers	Zeitoun	McSweeney's Books	
2010	Michael Lewis	The Big Short: Inside the Doomsday Machine	W. W. Norton & Company	
2011	Daniel Kahneman	Thinking, Fast and Slow	Farrar, Straus and Giroux	
2012	Katherine Boo	Behind the Beautiful Forevers: Life, Death, and Hope in a Mumbai Undercity	Random House	
2013	Sheri Fink	Five Days at Memorial: Life and Death in a Storm-Ravaged Hospital	Crown	
2014	Jeff Hobbs	The Short and Tragic Life of Robert Peace: A Brilliant Young Man Who Left Newark for the Ivy League	Scribner	
2015	Sarah Chayes	Thieves of State: Why Corruption Threatens Global Security	W.W. Norton and Company	
2016	Svetlana Alexievich with Bela Shayevich (trans.)	Secondhand Time: The Last of the Soviets	Random House	
2017	Nancy MacLean	Democracy in Chains: The Deep History of the Radical Right's Stealth Plan for America	Viking Press	
2018	Francisco Cantu	The Line Becomes a River: Dispatches From the Border	Riverhead Books	
2019	Emily Bazelon	Charged: The New Movement to Transform American Prosecution and End Mass Incarceration	Random House	
2020	Isabel Wilkerson	Caste: The Origins of Our Discontents	Random House	
2021	Adam Schiff	Midnight in Washington: How We Almost Lost Our Democracy and Still Could	Random House	
2022	Dahlia Lithwick	Lady Justice: Women, the Law, and the Battle to Save America	Penguin Press	
2023	Roxanna Asgarian	We Were Once a Family: A Story of Love, Death, and Child Removal in America	Farrar, Straus and Giroux	
2024	Jesse Katz	The Rent Collectors: Exploitation, Murder, and Redemption in Immigrant L.A.	Astra House	
2025	Brian Goldstone	There Is No Place for Us: Working and Homeless in America	Crown Publishing Group	

=== Fiction ===
Los Angeles Times Book Prize for Fiction winners
Year	Author	Title	Publisher	Ref.
1980	Walker Percy	The Second Coming	Farrar, Straus and Giroux	
1981	D.M. Thomas	The White Hotel	Viking	
1982	Robert Stone	A Flag for Sunrise	Alfred A. Knopf	
1983	Thomas Keneally	Schindler's Ark	Simon & Schuster	
1984	Milan Kundera	The Unbearable Lightness of Being	Harper & Row	
1985	Louise Erdrich	Love Medicine	Holt, Rinehart and Winston	
1986	Margaret Atwood	The Handmaid's Tale	Houghton Mifflin	
1987	James Welch	Fools Crow	Viking	
1988	Gabriel García Marquez	Love in the Time of Cholera	Alfred A. Knopf	
1989	Fay Weldon	The Heart of the Country	Viking	
1990	Edna O'Brien	Lantern Slides	Farrar, Straus and Giroux	
1991	Allan Gurganus	White People	Alfred A. Knopf	
1992	Art Spiegelman	Maus II, A Survivor's Tale: And Here My Troubles Began	Pantheon Books	
1993	Barbara Kingsolver	Pigs in Heaven	HarperCollins	
1994	David Malouf	Remembering Babylon	Pantheon Books	
1995	William Boyd	The Blue Afternoon	Alfred A. Knopf	
1996	Rohinton Mistry	A Fine Balance	Alfred A. Knopf	
1997	James Carlos Blake	In the Rogue Blood	Avon Books	
1998	W. G. Sebald with Michael Hulse (trans.)	The Rings of Saturn	New Directions	
1999	Amit Chaudhuri	Freedom Song: Three Novels	Alfred A. Knopf	
2000	David Means	Assorted Fire Events	Context Books	
2001	Mary Robison	Why Did I Ever	Counterpoint	
2002	Ian McEwan	Atonement	Nan A. Talese/Doubleday	
2003	Pete Dexter	Train	Doubleday	
2004	Colm Tóibín	The Master	Scribner	
2005	Gabriel García Márquez with Edith Grossman (trans.)	Memories of My Melancholy Whores	Alfred A. Knopf	
2006	A. B. Yehoshua with Hillel Halkin (trans.)	A Woman in Jerusalem	Harcourt	
2007	Andrew O'Hagan	Be Near Me	Harcourt	
2008	Marilynne Robinson	Home	Farrar, Straus and Giroux	
2009	Rafael Yglesias	A Happy Marriage	Scribner	
2010	Jennifer Egan	A Visit from the Goon Squad	Alfred A. Knopf	
2011	Alex Shakar	Luminarium	SOHO Press	
2012	Ben Fountain	Billy Lynn's Long Halftime Walk	HarperCollins Publishers / Ecco	
2013	Ruth Ozeki	A Tale for the Time Being	Viking	
2014	Siri Hustvedt	The Blazing World	Simon & Schuster	
2015	Valeria Luiselli	The Story of My Teeth	Coffee House Press	
2016	Adam Haslett	Imagine Me Gone	Little, Brown and Company	
2017	Mohsin Hamid	Exit West	Riverhead Books	
2018	Rebecca Makkai	The Great Believers	Viking	
2019	Ben Lerner	The Topeka School	Farrar, Straus and Giroux	
2020	David Diop with Anna Moschovakis (trans.)	At Night All Blood Is Black	Farrar, Straus and Giroux	
2021	Véronique Tadjo	In the Company of Men	Other Press	
2022	Mircea Cărtărescu with Sean Cotter (trans.)	Solenoid	Deep Vellum	
2023	Ed Park	Same Bed Different Dreams	Random House	
2024	Jennine Capó Crucet	Say Hello to My Little Friend	Simon & Schuster	
2025	Bryan Washington	Palaver: A Novel	Farrar, Straus & Giroux	

=== Graphic Novel/Comics ===
Los Angeles Book Prize for Graphic Novel winners
Year	Author	Title	Publisher	Ref.
2009	David Mazzucchelli	Asterios Polyp	Pantheon	
2010	Adam Hines	Duncan the Wonder Dog: Show One	AdHouse Books	
2011	Carla Speed McNeil	Finder: Voice	Dark Horse	
2012	Sammy Harkham	Everything Together: Collected Stories	PictureBox	
2013	Ulli Lust	Today Is the Last Day of the Rest of Your Life	Fantagraphics	
2014	Jaime Hernández	The Love Bunglers	Fantagraphics	
2015	Riad Sattouf	Arab of the Future: A Childhood in the Middle East, 1978–1984	Metropolitan Books	
2016	Nick Drnaso	Beverly	Drawn & Quarterly	
2017	Leslie Stein	Present	Drawn & Quarterly	
2018	Tillie Walden	On a Sunbeam	First Second Books	
2019	Eleanor Davis	The Hard Tomorrow	Drawn & Quarterly	
2020	Bishakh Som	Apsara Engine		
2021	R. Kikuo Johnson	No One Else	Fantagraphics	
2022	Jamila Rowser and Robyn Smith	Wash Day Diaries		
2023	E. M. Carroll	A Guest in the House	First Second Books	
2024	Taiyo Matsumoto	Tokyo These Days (Vol. 1)	Viz Media	
2025	Jaime Hernandez	Life Drawing: A Love and Rockets Collection	Fantagraphics	

=== History ===
Los Angeles Times Book Prize for History winners
Year	Author	Title	Publisher	Ref.
1980	Ronald Steel	Walter Lippmann and the American Century	Atlantic/Little, Brown and Co.	
1981	Ray Allen Billington	Land of Savagery, Land of Promise: The European Image of the American Frontier in the Nineteenth Century	W.W. Norton & Company	
1982	Jonathan D. Spence	The Gate of Heavenly Peace: The Chinese and Their Revolution, 1895–1980	Viking	
1983	Fernand Braudel	The Wheels of Commerce	Harper & Row	
1984	Robert Darnton	The Great Cat Massacre and Other Episodes in French Cultural History	Basic Books	
1985	Evan S. Connell	Son of the Morning Star: Custer and the Little Bighorn	North Point Press	
1986	Geoffrey Hosking	The First Socialist Society: A History of the Soviet Union from Within	Harvard University Press	
1987	Robert Jay Lifton	The Nazi Doctors: Medical Killing and the Psychology of Genocide	Basic Books	
1988	Eric Foner	Reconstruction: America's Unfinished Revolution, 1863–1877	Harper & Row	
1989	Neal Gabler	An Empire of Their Own: How the Jews Invented Hollywood	Crown	
1990	Richard Fletcher	The Quest for El Cid	Alfred A. Knopf	
1991	Nicholas Lemann	The Promised Land: The Great Black Migration and How It Changed America	Alfred A. Knopf	
1992	Alexander Stille	Benevolence and Betrayal: Five Italian Jewish Families under Fascism	Summit	
1993	Anthony Grafton	New Worlds, Ancient Texts: The Power of Tradition and the Shock of Discovery	Harvard University Press	
1994	George Chauncey	Gay New York: Gender, Urban Culture, and the Making of the Gay Male World, 1890–1940	Basic Books	
1995	Jackson Lears	Fables of Abundance: A Cultural History of Advertising in America	Basic Books	
1996	Neal Ascherson	Black Sea	Hill & Wang	
1997	Orlando Figes	A People's Tragedy: A History of the Russian Revolution	Viking	
1998	Roy Porter	The Greatest Benefit to Mankind: A Medical History of Humanity	W.W. Norton & Company	
1999	John W. Dower	Embracing Defeat: Japan in the Wake of World War II	W.W. Norton & Company	
2000	Alice Kaplan	The Collaborator: The Trial and Execution of Robert Brasillach	University of Chicago Press	
2001	Rick Perlstein	Before the Storm: Barry Goldwater and the Unmaking of the American Consensus	Hill and Wang Division/Farrar, Straus and Giroux	
2002	Michael B. Oren	Six Days of War: June 1967 and the Making of the Modern Middle East	Oxford University Press	
2003	Henry Wiencek	An Imperfect God: George Washington, His Slaves, and the Creation of America	Farrar, Straus and Giroux	
2004	Geoffrey R. Stone	Perilous Times: Free Speech in Wartime from the Sedition Act of 1798 to the War on Terrorism	W.W. Norton & Company	
2005	Adam Hochschild	Bury the Chains: Prophets and Rebels in the Fight to Free an Empire's Slaves	Houghton Mifflin	
2006	Lawrence Wright	The Looming Tower: Al-Qaeda and the Road to 9/11	Alfred A. Knopf	
2007	Tim Weiner	Legacy of Ashes: The History of the CIA	Doubleday	
2008	Mark Mazower	Hitler's Empire: How the Nazis Ruled Europe	Penguin Press	
2009	Kevin Starr	Golden Dreams: California in an Age of Abundance 1950–1963	Oxford University Press	
2010	Thomas Powers	The Killing of Crazy Horse	Alfred A. Knopf	
2011	Richard White	Railroaded: The Transcontinentals and the Making of Modern America	W.W. Norton & Company	
2012	Fergus M. Bordewich	America's Great Debate: Henry Clay, Stephen A. Douglas, and the Compromise That Preserved the Union	Simon & Schuster	
2013	Christopher Clark	The Sleepwalkers: How Europe Went to War in 1914	HarperCollins	
2014	Adam Tooze	The Deluge: The Great War, America and the Remaking of the Global Order, 1916–1931	Viking	
2015	Dan Ephron	Killing a King: The Assassination of Yitzhak Rabin and the Remaking of Israel	W.W. Norton & Company	
2016	Benjamin Madley	An American Genocide: The United States and the California Indian Catastrophe, 1846–1873	Yale University Press	
2017	Dan Egan	The Death and Life of the Great Lakes	W.W. Norton & Company	
2018	Julia Boyd	Travelers in the Third Reich: The Rise of Fascism: 1919–1945	Pegasus Books	
2019	Stephanie Jones-Rogers	They Were Her Property: White Women as Slave Owners in the American South	Yale University Press	
2020	Martha S. Jones	Vanguard: How Black Women Broke Barriers, Won the Vote, and Insisted on Equality for All	Basic Books	
2021	Ada Ferrer	Cuba: An American History	Scribner	
2022	Margaret A. Burnham	By Hands Now Known: Jim Crow's Legal Executioners	W.W. Norton & Company	
2023	Joya Chatterji	Shadows at Noon: The South Asian Twentieth Century	Yale University Press	
2024	Andrea Freeman	Ruin Their Crops on the Ground: The Politics of Food in the United States, From the Trail of Tears to School Lunch	St Martin's Press	
2025	Bench Ansfield	Born in Flames: The Business of Arson and the Remaking of the American City	W. W. Norton & Company	

=== Mystery/thriller ===
Los Angeles Times Book Prize for Mystery/Thriller winners
Year	Author	Title	Publisher	Ref.
2000	Val McDermid	A Place of Execution	St. Martin's Press/Minotaur	
2001	T. Jefferson Parker	Silent Joe	Hyperion	
2002	George P. Pelecanos	Hell to Pay	Little, Brown and Company	
2003	George P. Pelecanos	Soul Circus	Little, Brown and Company	
2004	Kem Nunn	Tijuana Straits	Scribner	
2005	Robert Littell	Legends: A Novel of Dissimulation	Overlook Press	
2006	Michael Connelly	Echo Park		
2007	Karin Fossum with Charlotte Barslund (trans.)	The Indian Bride	Harcourt	
2008	Michael Koryta	Envy the Night	Thomas Dunne Books/St. Martin's /Minotaur	
2009	Stuart Neville	The Ghosts of Belfast	SOHO Press	
2010	Tom Franklin	Crooked Letter, Crooked Letter	William Morrow and Co.	
2011	Stephen King	11/22/63	Scribner	
2012	Tana French	Broken Harbor	Viking	
2013	Robert Galbraith (J. K. Rowling)	The Cuckoo's Calling	Mulholland Books/Little, Brown and Company	
2014	Tom Bouman	Dry Bones in the Valley	W.W. Norton and Company	
2015	Don Winslow	The Cartel	Alfred A. Knopf	
2016	Bill Beverly	Dodgers	Crown	
2017	Joyce Carol Oates	A Book of American Martyrs	Ecco	
2018	Oyinkan Braithwaite	My Sister, the Serial Killer	Viking	
2019	Steph Cha	Your House Will Pay	Ecco	
2020	S. A. Cosby	Blacktop Wasteland	Flatiron Books	
2021	Megan Abbott	The Turnout	G.P. Putnam's Sons	
2022	Alex Segura	Secret Identity: A Novel	Flatiron Books	
2023	Ivy Pochoda	Sing Her Down	Farrar, Straus and Giroux	
2024	Danielle Trussoni	The Puzzle Box	Random House	
2025	Megan Abbott	El Dorado Drive	Penguin Publishing Group	

=== Poetry ===
Los Angeles Times Book Prize for Poetry winners
Year	Author	Title	Publisher	Ref.
1980	Robert Kelly	Kill the Messenger	Black Sparrow	
1981	Ntozake Shange	Three Pieces	St. Martin's Press	
1982	Allen Ginsberg	Plutonian Ode and Other Poems, 1977–1980	City Lights	
1983	James Merrill	The Changing Light at Sandover	Atheneum	
1984	Charles Olson	The Maximus Poems	University of California Press	
1985	X.J. Kennedy	Cross Ties	University of Georgia Press	
1986	Derek Walcott	Collected Poems, 1948–1984	Farrar, Straus and Giroux	
1987	William Meredith	Partial Accounts: New and Selected Poems	Alfred A. Knopf	
1988	Richard Wilbur	New and Collected Poems	Harcourt Brace Jovanovich	
1989	Donald Hall	The One Day: A Poem in Three Parts	Ticknor & Fields/ Houghton Mifflin Harcourt	
1990	John Caddy	The Color of Mesabi Bones	Milkweed	
1991	Philip Levine	What Work Is	Alfred A. Knopf	
1992	Adrienne Rich	An Atlas of the Difficult World: Poems 1988-1991	W.W. Norton & Company	
1993	Mark Doty	My Alexandria	University of Illinois Press	
1994	Carolyn Forché	The Angel of History	HarperCollins	
1995	Robert Pinsky	The Inferno of Dante	Farrar, Straus and Giroux	
1996	Alan Shapiro	Mixed Company	The University of Chicago Press	
1997	Charles Wright	Black Zodiac	Farrar, Straus and Giroux	
1998	Alice Notley	Mysteries of Small Houses	Penguin Press	
1999	C. K. Williams	Repair: Poems	Farrar, Straus and Giroux	
2000	Gjertrud Schnackenberg	The Throne of Labdacus	Farrar, Straus and Giroux	
2001	Anne Carson	The Beauty of the Husband: A Fictional Essay in 29 Tangos	Alfred A. Knopf	
2002	Cynthia Zarin	The Watercourse: Poems	Alfred A. Knopf	
2003	Anthony Hecht	Collected Later Poems	Alfred A. Knopf	
2004	Richard Howard	Inner Voices: Selected Poems, 1963–2003	Farrar, Straus and Giroux	
2005	Jack Gilbert	Refusing Heaven: Poems	Alfred A. Knopf	
2006	Frederick Seidel	Ooga-Booga	Farrar, Straus and Giroux	
2007	Stanley Plumly	Old Heart: Poems	W.W. Norton & Company	
2008	Frank Bidart	Watching the Spring Festival: Poems	Farrar, Straus and Giroux	
2009	Brenda Hillman	Practical Water	Wesleyan University Press	
2010	Maxine Kumin	Where I Live: New & Selected Poems 1990–2010	W.W. Norton & Company	
2011	Carl Phillips	Double Shadow: Poems	Farrar, Straus and Giroux	
2012	Louise Glück	Poems 1962–2012	Farrar, Straus and Giroux	
2013	Ron Padgett	Collected Poems	Coffee House Press	
2014	Claudia Rankine	Citizen: An American Lyric	Graywolf Press	
2015	Jorie Graham	From the New World: Poems 1976–2014	Ecco/HarperCollins	
2016	Rosmarie Waldrop	Gap Gardening: Selected Poems	New Directions	
2017	Patricia Smith	Incendiary Art: Poems	TriQuarterly/Northwestern University Press	
2018	Carl Phillips	Wild Is the Wind: Poems	Farrar, Straus and Giroux	
2019	Ilya Kaminsky	Deaf Republic: Poems	Graywolf Press	
2020	Victoria Chang	Obit	Copper Canyon Press	
2021	Diane Seuss	frank: sonnets	Graywolf Press	
2022	Dionne Brand	Nomenclature: New and Collected Poems	Duke University Press	
2023	Airea D. Matthews	Bread and Circus: Poems	Scribner	
2024	Remica Bingham-Risher	Room Swept Home	Wesleyan University Press	
2025	Allison Benis White	A Magnificent Loneliness	Four Way Books	

=== Science Fiction, Fantasy, and Speculative Fiction ===
The Ray Bradbury Prize for Science Fiction, Fantasy & Speculative Fiction winners
Year	Author	Title	Publisher	Ref.
2019	Marlon James	Black Leopard, Red Wolf	Riverhead Books	
2020	Stephen Graham Jones	The Only Good Indians	Saga Press	
2021	Zen Cho	Spirits Abroad: Stories	Small Beer Press	
2022	Nicola Griffith	Spear	Tor Books	
2023	Tananarive Due	The Reformatory	Saga Press	
2024	Kelly Link	The Book of Love	Random House	
2025	Silvia Park	Luminous	Simon & Schuster	

=== Science and technology ===
Los Angeles Times Book Prize for Science and Technology winners
Year	Author	Title	Publisher	Ref.
1989	Frans de Waal	Peacemaking among Primates	Harvard University Press	
1990	Jane S. Smith	Patenting the Sun: Polio and the Salk Vaccine	William Morrow and Co.	
1991	Grigori Medvedev	The Truth About Chernobyl	Basic Books	
1992	Jared Diamond	The Third Chimpanzee: The Evolution and Future of the Human Animal	HarperCollins	
1993	Daniel McNeill and Paul Freiberger	Fuzzy Logic: The Discovery of a Revolutionary Computer Technology -- and How It Is Changing Our World	Simon & Schuster	
1994	Jonathan Weiner	The Beak of the Finch: A Story of Evolution in Our Time	Alfred A. Knopf	
1995	Edward O. Wilson	Naturalist	Island Press	
1996	Carl Sagan	The Demon-Haunted World: Science as a Candle in the Dark	Random House	
1997	Steven Pinker	How the Mind Works	W.W. Norton & Company	
1998	Douglas Starr	Blood: An Epic History of Medicine and Commerce	Alfred A. Knopf	
1999	Dava Sobel	Galileo's Daughter: A Historical Memoir of Science, Faith and Love	Walker and Company	
2000	James Le Fanu, M.D.	The Rise and Fall of Modern Medicine	Carroll & Graf	
2001	Richard Hamblyn	The Invention of Clouds: How an Amateur Meteorologist Forged the Language of the Skies	Farrar, Straus and Giroux	
2002	Brenda Maddox	Rosalind Franklin: The Dark Lady of DNA	HarperCollins	
2003	Philip J. Hilts	Protecting America's Health: The FDA, Business, and One Hundred Years of Regulation	Alfred A. Knopf	
2004	Charles Wohlforth	The Whale and the Supercomputer: On the Northern Front of Climate Change	North Point Press / Farrar, Straus and Giroux	
2005	Diana Preston	Before the Fallout: From Marie Curie to Hiroshima	Walker & Company	
2006	Eric R. Kandel	In Search of Memory: The Emergence of a New Science of Mind	W.W. Norton & Company	
2007	Douglas Hofstadter	I Am a Strange Loop	Basic Books	
2008	Leonard Susskind	The Black Hole War: My Battle with Stephen Hawking to Make the World Safe for Quantum Mechanics	Little, Brown and Company	
2009	Graham Farmelo	The Strangest Man: The Hidden Life of Paul Dirac, Mystic of the Atom	Basic Books/Perseus Book Group	
2010	Oren Harman	The Price of Altruism: George Price and the Search for the Origins of Kindness	W.W. Norton & Company	
2011	Sylvia Nasar	Grand Pursuit: The Story of Economic Genius	Simon & Schuster	
2012	Florence Williams	Breasts: A Natural and Unnatural History	W.W. Norton & Company	
2013	Alan Weisman	Countdown: Our Last, Best Hope for a Future on Earth?	Little, Brown and Company	
2014	Elizabeth Kolbert	The Sixth Extinction: An Unnatural History	Henry Holt & Co	
2015	Andrea Wulf	The Invention of Nature: Alexander von Humboldt's New World	Alfred A. Knopf	
2016	Luke Dittrich	Patient H.M.: A Story of Memory, Madness, and Family Secrets	Random House	
2017	Robert Sapolsky	Behave: The Biology of Humans at Our Best and Worst	Penguin Books	
2018	Beth Macy	Dopesick: Dealers, Doctors, and the Drug Company That Addicted America	Little, Brown and Company	
2019	Maria Popova	Figuring	Pantheon	
2020	Sara Seager	The Smallest Lights in the Universe: A Memoir	Crown	
2021	Chanda Prescod-Weinstein	The Disordered Cosmos: A Journey into Dark Matter, Spacetime, and Dreams Deferred	Bold Type Books	
2022	Sabrina Imbler	How Far the Light Reaches: A Life in Ten Sea Creatures	Little, Brown and Company	
2023	Eugenia Cheng	Is Math Real? How Simple Questions Lead Us To Mathematics' Deepest Truths.	Basic Books	
2024	Rebecca Boyle	Our Moon: How Earth's Celestial Companion Transformed the Planet, Guided Evolution, and Made Us Who We Are	Random House	
2025	Karen Hao	Empire of AI: Dreams and Nightmares in Sam Altman’s OpenAI	Penguin Publishing Group	

=== Young adult literature ===
Los Angeles Times Book Prize for Young Adult Literature winners
Year	Author	Title	Publisher	Ref.
1998	Joan Bauer	Rules of the Road	G.P. Putnam's Sons	
1999	Robert Cormier	Frenchtown Summer	Delacorte Press	
2000	Jacqueline Woodson	Miracle's Boys	G.P. Putnam's Son	
2001	Mildred D. Taylor	The Land	Phyllis Fogelman Books / G.P. Putnam's Sons	
2002	M. T. Anderson	Feed	Candlewick Press	
2003	Jennifer Donnelly	A Northern Light	Harcourt Children's Books	
2004	Melvin Burgess	Doing It	Henry Holt Books for Young Readers	
2005	Per Nilsson with Tara Chace (trans.)	You & You & You	Front Street/Boyds Mills Press	
2006	Coe Booth	Tyrell	Push / Scholastic	
2007	Philip Reeve	A Darkling Plain	Scholastic	
2008	Terry Pratchett	Nation	HarperCollins	
2009	Elizabeth Partridge	Marching for Freedom: Walk Together Children and Don't You Grow Weary	Viking Children's Books/Penguin Group	
2010	Megan Whalen Turner	A Conspiracy of Kings	Greenwillow/HarperCollins	
2011	Pete Hautman	The Big Crunch	Scholastic	
2012	A. S. King	Ask the Passengers	Little, Brown and Company	
2013	Gene Yang	Boxers and Saints	First Second/Macmillan	
2014	Candace Fleming	The Family Romanov: Murder, Rebellion, and the Fall of Imperial Russia	Schwartz & Wade/Random House Children's	
2015	Marilyn Nelson	My Seneca Village	Namelos	
2016	Frances Hardinge	The Lie Tree	Harry N. Abrams	
2017	Jason Reynolds	Long Way Down		
2018	Elizabeth Acevedo	The Poet X	HarperTeen	
2019	Malla Nunn	When the Ground Is Hard	G.P. Putnam	
2020	Yusef Salaam and Ibi Zoboi	Punching the Air	Balzer + Bray	
2021	Rita Williams-Garcia	A Sitting in St. James	Quill Tree Books/HarperCollins Children's Books	
2022	Lyn Miller-Lachmann	Torch		
2023	Amber McBride	Gone Wolf	Feiwel & Friends	
2024	Kim Johnson	The Color of a Lie	Random House Books for Young Readers	
2025	Trung Le Nguyen	Angelica and the Bear Prince	Random House Books Children's Books	

=== Innovator's Award ===
Innovator's Award winners
Year	Author	Ref.
2009	Dave Eggers	
2010	Powell's Books, bookstore	
2011	Figment, self-publishing platform	
2012	Margaret Atwood	
2013	John Green	
2014	LeVar Burton	
2015	James Patterson	
2016	Rueben Martinez	
2017	Glory Edim	
2018	Library of America	
2019	WriteGirl	
2020	Book Industry Charitable Foundation	
2021	Reginald Dwayne Betts	
2022	Freedom to Read Foundation	
2023	—	
2024	Amanda Gorman	
2025	We Need Diverse Books	

=== Robert Kirsch Award ===
The Robert Kirsch Award winners
Year	Author	Ref.
1980	Wallace Stegner	
1981	Wright Morris	
1982	Ross Macdonald	
1983	M. F. K. Fisher	
1984	Christopher Isherwood	
1985	Janet Lewis	
1986	Kay Boyle	
1987	Paul Horgan	
1988	Thom Gunn	
1989	Karl Shapiro	
1990	Czeslaw Milosz	
1991	Ken Kesey	
1992	Diane Johnson	
1993	Carolyn See	
1994	Brian Moore	
1995	Stephen J. Pyne	
1996	Gary Snyder	
1997	Ray Bradbury	
1998	John Sanford	
1999	Ursula K. Le Guin	
2000	Lawrence Ferlinghetti	
2001	Tillie Olsen	
2002	Larry McMurtry	
2003	Ishmael Reed	
2004	Tony Hillerman	
2005	Joan Didion	
2006	William Kittredge	
2007	Maxine Hong Kingston	
2008	Robert Alter	
2009	Evan S. Connell	
2010	Beverly Cleary	
2011	Rudolfo Anaya	
2012	Kevin Starr	
2013	Susan Straight	
2014	TC Boyle	
2015	Juan Felipe Herrera	
2016	Thomas McGuane	
2017	John Rechy	
2018	Terry Tempest Williams	
2019	Walter Mosley	
2020	Leslie Marmon Silko	
2021	Luis J. Rodriguez	
2022	James Ellroy	
2023	Jane Smiley	
2024	Pico Iyer	
2025	Amy Tan	
