= Los Angeles Times Book Prize for Biography =

Annual literary award

Los Angeles Times Book Prize for Biography, established in 1981, is a category of the Los Angeles Times Book Prize. Works are eligible during the year of their first US publication in English, though they may be written originally in languages other than English.

== Recipients ==
Los Angeles Times Book Prize for Biography winners and finalists
Year	Author	Title	Subject	Result	Ref.
1981	David McCullough	Mornings on Horseback	Theodore Roosevelt, 26th president of the United States, serving from 1901 to 1909 (1858–1919)	Winner	
1982	Gay Wilson Allen	Waldo Emerson: A Biography	Ralph Waldo Emerson, American philosopher, essayist, and poet (1803–1882)	Winner	
1983	Seymour Hersh	The Price of Power: Kissinger in the Nixon White House	Henry Kissinger, German-born American politician, diplomat, and geopolitical consultant (1923–2023)	Winner	
1984	Ernst Pawel	The Nightmare of Reason: A Life of Franz Kafka	Franz Kafka, Bohemian writer from Prague (1883–1924)	Winner	
1985	Michael Scammell	Solzhenitsyn: A Biography	Aleksandr Solzhenitsyn, Russian writer and historian (1918–2008)	Winner	
1986	Maynard Mack	Alexander Pope: A Life	Alexander Pope, English poet (1688–1744)	Winner	
1987	Kenneth S. Lynn	Hemingway	Ernest Hemingway, American author and journalist (1899–1961)	Winner	
1988	Brenda Maddox	Nora: The Real Life of Molly Bloom	Nora Barnacle, Muse and wife of Irish author James Joyce (1884–1951)	Winner	
1989	Tobias Wolff	This Boy's Life: A Memoir		Winner	
1990	Geoffrey C. Ward	A First-Class Temperament: The Emergence of Franklin Roosevelt	Franklin D. Roosevelt, 32nd president of the United States, serving from 1933 to 1945 (1882–1945)	Winner	
1990	Robert A. Caro	Means of Ascent: Volume 2 of The Years of Lyndon Johnson	Lyndon B. Johnson, 36th president of the United States, serving from 1963 to 1969 (1908–1973)	Finalist	
1990	Deirdre Bair	Simone de Beauvoir: A Biography	Simone de Beauvoir, French philosopher, social theorist and activist (1908–1986)	Finalist	
1990	Patricia O'Toole	The Five of Hearts: An Intimate Portrait of Henry Adams and His Friends, 1880–1918	Henry Adams, American historian and Adams political family member (1838–1918)	Finalist	
1990	Hugo Young	The Iron Lady: A Biography of Margaret Thatcher	Margaret Thatcher, Prime Minister of the United Kingdom from 1979 to 1990 (1925–2013)	Finalist	
1991	T. H. Watkins	Righteous Pilgrim: The Life and Times of Harold L. Ickes, 1874–1952	Harold L. Ickes, American politician, Secretary of State from 1933 to 1946 (1874–1952)	Winner	
1991	Natalie Kusz	Road Song: A Memoir		Finalist	
1991	Benita Eisler	O'Keeffe and Stieglitz: An American Romance	Georgia O'Keeffe, American modernist artist (1887–1986), and Alfred Stieglitz, American photographer (1864–1946)	Finalist	
1991	Willard Sterne Randall	Benedict Arnold: Patriot and Traitor	Benedict Arnold, American military officer during the Revolutionary War who defected to the British (1741–1801)	Finalist	
1991	John Richardson	A Life of Picasso: Volume 1. The Prodigy, 1881–1906	Pablo Picasso, Spanish painter and sculptor, known for co-founding the Cubist movement (1881–1973)	Finalist	
1992	Blanche Wiesen Cook	Eleanor Roosevelt: Volume One, 1884–1933	Eleanor Roosevelt, First Lady of the United States from 1933 to 1945 (1884–1962)	Winner	
1992	Edwin Haviland Miller	Salem Is My Dwelling Place: A Life of Nathaniel Hawthorne	Nathaniel Hawthorne, American novelist and short story writer (1804–1864)	Finalist	
1992	Deena Ruth Rosenberg	Fascinating Rhythm: The Collaboration of George and Ira Gershwin	George Gershwin, American pianist and composer (1898–1937), and his brother, Ira Gershwin, American lyricist (1896–1983)	Finalist	
1992	Kenneth Silverman	Edgar A. Poe: Mournful and Never-ending Remembrance	Edgar Allan Poe, American writer and literary critic (1809–1849)	Finalist	
1992	William Martin	A Prophet With Honor: The Billy Graham Story	Billy Graham, American Christian evangelist (1918–2018)	Finalist	
1993	John Mack Faragher	Daniel Boone: The Life and Legend of an American Pioneer	Daniel Boone, American pioneer and frontiersman (1734–1820)	Winner	
1993	Antonia Fraser	The Six Wives of Henry VIII	Wives of Henry VIII	Finalist	
1993	Philip B. Kunhardt, Jr., Philip B. Kunhardt III, and Peter W. Kunhardt	Lincoln: An Illustrated Biography	Abraham Lincoln, 16th president of the United States, serving from 1861 to 1865 (1809–1865)	Finalist	
1993	William Lanouette and Bela Silard	Genius in the Shadows: A Biography of Leo Szilard, the Man Behind the Bomb	Leo Szilard, Hungarian-American physicist and inventor (1898–1964)	Finalist	
1993	Joseph Brent	Charles Sanders Peirce: A Life	Charles Sanders Peirce, American thinker who founded pragmatism (1839–1914)	Finalist	
1994	Mikal Gilmore	Shot in the Heart	Gary Gilmore, American murderer (1940–1977)	Winner	
1994	Ruth Butler	Rodin: The Shape of Genius	Auguste Rodin, French sculptor generally considered the founder of modern sculpture (1840–1917)	Finalist	
1994	Gerald Gunther	Learned Hand: The Man and the Judge	Learned Hand, American jurist (1872–1961)	Finalist	
1994	Joan D. Hedrick	Harriet Beecher Stowe: A Life	Harriet Beecher Stowe, American abolitionist and author (1811–1896)	Finalist	
1994	Brian Keenan	An Evil Cradling		Finalist	
1995	Doris Lessing	Under My Skin: Volume One of My Autobiography, to 1949		Winner	
1995	Susan Quinn	Marie Curie: A Life	Marie Curie, Polish-French physicist and chemist (1867–1934)	Finalist	
1995	Tobias Wolff	In Pharaoh's Army: Memories of the Lost War		Finalist	
1995	Alix Kates Shulman	Drinking the Rain: A Memoir		Finalist	
1995	Brenda Maddox	D.H. Lawrence: The Story of a Marriage	D. H. Lawrence, English writer and poet (1885–1930)	Finalist	
1996	Frank McCourt	Angela's Ashes: A Memoir		Winner	
1996	Fiona MacCarthy	William Morris: A Life for Our Time	William Morris, British textile designer, novelist, and socialist activist (1834–1896)	Finalist	
1996	Lyle Leverich	Tom: The Unknown Tennessee Williams	Tennessee Williams, American playwright (1911–1983)	Finalist	
1996	Simon Callow	Orson Welles: The Road to Xanadu	Orson Welles, American actor, director, writer, and producer (1915–1985)	Finalist	
1996	John Richardson	A Life of Picasso: Volume 2. The Cubist Rebel, 1907–1916	Pablo Picasso, Spanish painter and sculptor, known for co-founding the Cubist movement (1881–1973)	Finalist	
1996	Hannah Pakula	An Uncommon Woman: The Empress Frederick	Victoria, Princess Royal, princess of the United Kingdom and German Empress (1840–1901)	Finalist	
1996	Gail Levin	Edward Hopper: An Intimate Biography	Edward Hopper, American realist painter, widely known for his oil paintings (1882–1967)	Finalist	
1996	Joan Mellen	Hellman and Hammett: The Legendary Passion of Lillian Hellman and Dashiell Hammett	Lillian Hellman, American dramatist and screenwriter (1905–1984), and Dashiell Hammett, American writer (1894–1961)	Finalist	
1997	Sam Tanenhaus	Whittaker Chambers: A Biography	Whittaker Chambers, Defected communist spy, writer, editor (1901– 1961)	Winner	
1997	A.M. Sperber and Eric Lax	Bogart	Humphrey Bogart, American actor (1899–1957)	Finalist	
1997	James Salter	Burning the Days: Recollection		Finalist	
1997	Alan Schom	Napoleon Bonaparte: A Life	Napoleon, French Emperor 1804–1814 and again in 1815 (1769–1821)	Finalist	
1997	Gavin Lambert	Nazimova: A Biography	Alla Nazimova, Russian-American actress, director, and producer (1879–1945)	Finalist	
1998	A. Scott Berg	Lindbergh	Charles Lindbergh, American aviator, military officer, author, inventor, and activist (1902–1974)	Winner	
1998	Fintan O'Toole	A Traitor's Kiss: The Life of Richard Brinsley Sheridan, 1751–1816	Richard Brinsley Sheridan, Irish satirist, a politician, a playwright, poet, and long-term owner of the London Theatre Royal, Drury Lane (1751–1816)	Finalist	
1998	Barbara Goldsmith	Other Powers: The Age of Suffrage, Spiritualism, and the Scandalous Victoria Woodhull	Victoria Woodhull, American women's suffrage movement leader (1838–1927)	Finalist	
1998	Hilary Spurling	The Unknown Matisse: Volume 1. The Early Years, 1869–1908	Henri Matisse, 20th-century French artist (1869–1954)	Finalist	
1998	Graham Robb	Victor Hugo: A Biography	Victor Hugo, French novelist, poet, and dramatist (1802–1885)	Finalist	
1999	Judith Thurman	Secrets of the Flesh: A Life of Colette	Colette, French writer, (1873–1954)	Winner	
1999	Benita Eisler	Byron: Child of Passion, Fool of Fame	Lord Byron, 19th-century English Romantic poet and lyricist (1788–1824)	Finalist	
1999	Robert Clark	My Grandfather's House: A Genealogy of Doubt and Faith		Finalist	
1999	Simon Schama	Rembrandt's Eyes	Rembrandt, 17th-century Dutch painter and printmaker (1606–1669)	Finalist	
1999	Jerome Loving	Walt Whitman: The Song of Himself	Walt Whitman, American poet, essayist and journalist (1819–1892)	Finalist	
2000	William J. Cooper, Jr.	Jefferson Davis, American	Jefferson Davis, President of the Confederate States from 1861 to 1865 (1808–1889)	Winner	
2000	Joseph J. Ellis	Founding Brothers: The Revolutionary Generation	Founding Fathers of the United States	Finalist	
2000	Ian Kershaw	Hitler: Volume 2. 1936–1945 Nemesis	Adolf Hitler, Führer of Nazi Germany (1889–1945)	Finalist	
2000	Philip Short	Mao: A Life	Mao Zedong, also known as chairman Mao, founding father of the People's Republic of China (1893–1976)	Finalist	
2000	H.W. Brands	The First American: The Life and Times of Benjamin Franklin	Benjamin Franklin, American polymath and a Founding Father of the United States (1706–1790)	Finalist	
2001	Edmund Morris	Theodore Rex	Theodore Roosevelt, the 26th president of the United States, serving from 1901 to 1909 (1858–1919)	Winner	
2001	Adam Sisman	Boswell's Presumptuous Task: The Making of the Life of Dr. Johnson	James Boswell, Scottish lawyer, diarist, and author (1740–1795)	Finalist	
2001	David McCullough	John Adams	John Adams, 2nd president of the United States, serving from 1797 to 1801 (1735–1826)	Finalist	
2001	Antonia Fraser	Marie Antoinette: The Journey	Marie Antoinette, Queen of France from 1774 to 1792 (1755–1793)	Finalist	
2001	Laura Hillenbrand	Seabiscuit: An American Legend	Seabiscuit, Champion thoroughbred racehorse in the United States	Finalist	
2002	Robert A. Caro	Master of the Senate: The Years of Lyndon Johnson, Vol. 3	Lyndon B. Johnson, 36th president of the United States, serving from 1963 to 1969 (1908–1973)	Winner	
2002	T. J. Stiles	Jesse James: Last Rebel of the Civil War	Jesse James, American outlaw (1847–1882)	Finalist	
2002	Claire Tomalin	Samuel Pepys: The Unequalled Self	Samuel Pepys, English diarist (1633–1703)	Finalist	
2002	Daniel Ellsberg	Secrets: A Memoir of Vietnam and the Pentagon Papers		Finalist	
2002	Gioconda Belli	The Country Under My Skin: A Memoir of Love and War		Finalist	
2003	Neil Smith	American Empire: Roosevelt's Geographer and the Prelude to Globalization	Isaiah Bowman, American geographer and President of Johns Hopkins University, 1935–1948 (1878–1950)	Winner	
2003	Robert Hughes	Goya	Francisco Goya, 18th and 19th-century Spanish painter and printmaker (1746–1828)	Finalist	
2003	Deirdre Bair	Jung: A Biography	Carl Jung, Swiss psychiatrist and psychotherapist (1875–1961)	Finalist	
2003	T.J. Binyon	Pushkin: A Biography	Alexander Pushkin, Russian poet, playwright, and novelist (1799–1837)	Finalist	
2003	Rebecca Solnit	River of Shadows: Eadweard Muybridge and the Technological Wild West	Eadweard Muybridge, English-American photographer, known for his pioneering work in photographic studies of motion, and early work in motion-picture projection (1830–1904)	Finalist	
2004	Mark Stevens and Annalyn Swan	de Kooning: An American Master	Willem de Kooning, Dutch-American abstract expressionist artist (1904– 1997)	Winner	
2004	Ron Chernow	Alexander Hamilton	Alexander Hamilton, American founding father and statesman (1757–1804)	Finalist	
2004	Richard Rhodes	John James Audubon: The Making of an American	John James Audubon, American self-trained artist, naturalist, and ornithologist (1785–1851)	Finalist	
2004	Michael Ybarra	Washington Gone Crazy: Senator Pat McCarran and the Great American Communist Hunt	Pat McCarran, American judge and politician (1876–1954)	Finalist	
2004	Stephen Greenblatt	Will in the World: How Shakespeare Became Shakespeare	William Shakespeare, English poet, playwright, and actor (1564–1616)	Finalist	
2005	Hilary Spurling	Matisse the Master: A Life of Henri Matisse, the Conquest of Colour, 1909–1954	Henri Matisse, 20th-century French artist (1869–1954)	Winner	
2005	Andrew Delbanco	Melville: His World and Work	Herman Melville, 19th-century American novelist, short story writer, essayist, and poet (1819–1891)	Finalist	
2005	Marion Elizabeth Rodgers	Mencken: The American Iconoclast	H. L. Mencken, American journalist and writer (1880–1956)	Finalist	
2005	Doris Kearns Goodwin	Team of Rivals: The Political Genius of Abraham Lincoln	Abraham Lincoln, 16th president of the United States, serving from 1861 to 1865	Finalist	
2005	Steven Watts	The People's Tycoon: Henry Ford and the American Century	Henry Ford, American industrialist and businessman (1863–1947)	Finalist	
2006	Neal Gabler	Walt Disney: The Triumph of the American Imagination	Walt Disney, American entrepreneur, animator and producer (1901–1966)	Winner	
2006	Jeffrey Goldberg	Prisoners: A Muslim and a Jew Across the Middle East Divide		Finalist	
2006	Rodney Bolt	The Librettist of Venice: The Remarkable Life of Lorenzo Da Ponte	Lorenzo Da Ponte, Italian, later American, opera librettist, poet and Roman Catholic priest (1749–1838)	Finalist	
2006	Daniel Mendelsohn	The Lost: A Search for Six of Six Million		Finalist	
2006	Debby Applegate	The Most Famous Man in America: The Biography of Henry Ward Beecher	Henry Ward Beecher, American clergyman and abolitionist (1813–1887)	Finalist	
2007	Simon Sebag Montefiore	Young Stalin	Joseph Stalin, Leader of the Soviet Union from 1924 to 1953 (1878–1953)	Winner	
2007	Robert Morgan	Boone: A Biography	Daniel Boone, American pioneer and frontiersman (1734–1820)	Finalist	
2007	Nancy Isenberg	Fallen Founder: The Life of Aaron Burr	Aaron Burr, 3rd vice president of the United States from 1801 to 1805 (1756–1836)	Finalist	
2007	Tim Jeal	Stanley: The Impossible Life of Africa's Greatest Explorer	Henry Morton Stanley, Welsh journalist and explorer, famous for his exploration of Central Africa (1841–1904)	Finalist	
2007	Michael J. Neufeld	Von Braun: Dreamer of Space, Engineer of War	Wernher von Braun, German-American aerospace engineer (1912–1977)	Finalist	
2008	Paula J. Giddings	Ida: A Sword Among Lions: Ida B. Wells and the Campaign Against Lynching	Ida B. Wells, African-American civil rights activist (1862–1931)	Winner	
2008	Jon Meacham	American Lion: Andrew Jackson in the White House	Andrew Jackson, 7th president of the United States from 1829 to 1837 (1767–1845)	Finalist	
2008	Jackie Wullschlager	Chagall: A Biography	Marc Chagall, French artist (1887–1985)	Finalist	
2008	Ernest Freeberg	Democracy's Prisoner: Eugene V. Debs, the Great War, and the Right to Dissent		Finalist	
2008	H.W. Brands	Traitor to His Class: The Privileged Life and Radical Presidency of Franklin Delano Roosevelt	Franklin Delano Roosevelt, 32nd president of the United States from 1933 to 1945	Finalist	
2009	Linda Gordon	Dorothea Lange: A Life Beyond Limits	Dorothea Lange, American photojournalist (1895–1965)	Winner	
2009	Michael Scammell	Koestler: The Literary and Political Odyssey of a Twentieth-Century Skeptic	Arthur Koestler, Jewish Hungarian-British author and journalist (1905–1983)	Finalist	
2009	Melvin I. Urofsky	Louis D. Brandeis: A Life	Louis D. Brandeis, United States Supreme Court justice from 1916 to 1939 (1856–1941)	Finalist	
2009	Kenneth Whyte	The Uncrowned King: The Sensational Rise of William Randolph Hearst	William Randolph Hearst, American newspaper publisher (1863–1951)	Finalist	
2009	Kirstin Downey	The Woman Behind the New Deal: The Life of Frances Perkins, FDR's Secretary of Labor and His Moral Conscience	Frances Perkins, American politician and workers rights advocate (1880–1965)	Finalist	
2010	Laura Hillenbrand	Unbroken: A World War II Story of Survival, Resilience, and Redemption	Louis Zamperini, American athlete and army officer (1917–2014)	Winner	
2010	Edmund Morris	Colonel Roosevelt	Theodore Roosevelt, 26th president of the United States, serving from 1901 to 1909 (1858–1919)	Finalist	
2010	Miranda Carter	George, Nicholas and Wilhelm: Three Royal Cousins and the Road to World War I	King George V of Britain, Kaiser Wilhelm II of Germany, and Tsar Nicholas II of Russia	Finalist	
2010	Christopher Hitchens	Hitch-22: A Memoir		Finalist	
2010	Selina Hastings	The Secret Lives of Somerset Maugham: A Biography	W. Somerset Maugham, English playwright and writer (1874–1965)	Finalist	
2011	John A. Farrell	Clarence Darrow: Attorney for the Damned	Clarence Darrow, American lawyer and leading member of the American Civil Liberties Union (1857– 1938)	Winner	
2011	Robert K. Massie	Catherine the Great: Portrait of a Woman	Catherine the Great, Empress of Russia from 1762 to 1796 (1729–1796)	Finalist	
2011	Manning Marable	Malcolm X: A Life of Reinvention	Malcolm X, African-American human rights activist (1925–1965)	Finalist	
2011	Mark Whitaker	My Long Trip Home: A Family Memoir		Finalist	
2011	Alexandra Styron	Reading My Father: A Memoir		Finalist	
2012	Robert A. Caro	The Passage of Power: The Years of Lyndon Johnson	Lyndon B. Johnson, 36th president of the United States, serving from 1963 to 1969 (1908–1973)	Winner	
2012	Alice Kessler-Harris	A Difficult Woman: The Challenging Life and Times of Lillian Hellman	Lillian Hellman, American dramatist and screenwriter (1905–1984)	Finalist	
2012	H.W. Brands	The Man Who Saved the Union: Ulysses Grant in War and Peace	Ulysses S. Grant, 18th president of the United States from 1869 to 1877 (1822–1885)	Finalist	
2012	R.J. Smith	The One: The Life and Music of James Brown	James Brown, American musician (1933–2006)	Finalist	
2012	David Nasaw	The Patriarch: The Remarkable Life and Turbulent Times of Joseph P. Kennedy	Joseph P. Kennedy, American businessman and politician (1888–1969)	Finalist	
2013	Marie Arana	Bolivar: American Liberator	Simon Bolívar, Venezuelan military and political leader (1783–1830)	Winner	
2013	Deborah Solomon	American Mirror: The Life and Art of Norman Rockwell	Norman Rockwell, 20th-century American painter and illustrator (1894–1978)	Finalist	
2013	Edna O'Brien	Country Girl: A Memoir		Finalist	
2013	Benita Eisler	The Red Man's Bones: George Catlin, Artist and Showman	George Catlin, 19th-century American painter, adventurer, lawyer, author, and traveler (1796–1872)	Finalist	
2013	A. Scott Berg	Wilson	Woodrow Wilson, 28th president of the United States, serving from 1913 to 1921 (1856–1924)	Finalist	
2014	Andrew Roberts	Napoleon: A Life	Napoleon, French Emperor 1804–1814 and again in 1815 (1769–1821)	Winner	
2014	Robert M. Dowling	Eugene O'Neill: A Life in Four Acts	Eugene O'Neill, American playwright, and Nobel laureate in Literature (1888–1953)	Finalist	
2014	Kirstin Downey	Isabella: The Warrior Queen	Isabella of Castile, Queen of Castile who sponsored Christopher Columbus's journey and established the Spanish Inquisition (1451–1504)	Finalist	
2014	Stephen Kotkin	Stalin: Paradoxes of Power, 1878–1928	Joseph Stalin, Leader of the Soviet Union from 1924 to 1953 (1878–1953)	Finalist	
2014	Adam Begley	Updike	John Updike, American novelist, poet, short story writer, art critic, and literary critic (1932–2009)	Finalist	
2015	Hayden Herrera	Listening to Stone: The Art and Life of Isamu Noguchi	Isamu Noguchi, Japanese-American artist (1904–1988)	Winner	
2015	Terry Alford	Fortune's Fool: The Life of John Wilkes Booth	John Wilkes Booth, 19th-century American stage actor and assassin of Abraham Lincoln (1838–1865)	Finalist	
2015	Charlotte DeCroes Jacobs	Jonas Salk: A Life	Jonas Salk, 20th-century American virologist; inventor of the polio vaccine (1914–1995)	Finalist	
2015	John Norris	Mary McGrory The First Queen of Journalism	Mary McGrory, American journalist and columnist (1918 –2004)	Finalist	
2015	Patrick McGilligan	Young Orson: The Years of Luck and Genius on the Path to Citizen Kane	Orson Welles, American actor, director, writer, and producer (1915–1985)	Finalist	
2016	Volker Ullrich with Jefferson Chase (trans.)	Hitler: Ascent, 1889–1939	Adolf Hitler, Führer of Nazi Germany (1889–1945)	Winner	
2016	Claire Harman	Charlotte Brontë: A Fiery Heart	Charlotte Brontë, English novelist and poet (1816–1855)	Finalist	
2016	Frances Wilson	Guilty Thing: A Life of Thomas De Quincey	Thomas De Quincey, English essayist, (1785–1859)	Finalist	
2016	James McBride	Kill 'Em and Leave: Searching for the Real James Brown	James Brown, American musician (1933–2006)	Finalist	
2016	Ross King	Mad Enchantment: Claude Monet and the Painting of the Water Lilies	Claude Monet, French painter (1840–1926)	Finalist	
2017	Laura Walls	Henry David Thoreau: A Life	Henry David Thoreau, 19th-century American essayist, poet, and philosopher	Winner	
2017	Jonathan Eig	Ali: A Life	Muhammad Ali, American boxer, philanthropist and activist (1942–2016)	Finalist	
2017	Adam Federman	Fasting and Feasting: The Life of Visionary Food Writer Patience Gray	Patience Gray, English cookery and travel writer of the mid-20th century (1917– 2005)	Finalist	
2017	Ron Chernow	Grant	Ulysses S. Grant, 18th president of the United States, serving from 1869 to 1877 (1822 –1885)	Finalist	
2017	John A. Farrell	Richard Nixon: The Life	Richard Nixon, 37th president of the United States from 1969 to 1974 (1913–1994)	Finalist	
2018	David W. Blight	Frederick Douglass: Prophet of Freedom	Frederick Douglass, African-American social reformer, writer, and abolitionist (c. 1818–1895)	Winner	
2018	Seymour M. Hersh	Reporter: A Memoir	Seymour M. Hersh, American journalist (1937–)	Finalist	
2018	Victoria Johnson	American Eden: David Hosack, Botany, and Medicine in the Garden of the Early Republic	David Hosack, American physician, botanist, and educator (1769–1835)	Finalist	
2018	Bob Spitz	Reagan: An American Journey	Ronald Reagan, 40th president of the United States, serving from 1981 to 1989 (1911–2004)	Finalist	
2018	Tara Westover	Educated	Tara Westover, American historian and author (1986–)	Finalist	
2019	George Packer	Our Man: Richard Holbrooke and the End of the American Century	Richard Holbrooke, American diplomat and author (1941–2010)	Winner	
2019	Leo Damrosch	The Club	Samuel Johnson, James Boswell, Edmund Burke, Adam Smith, Edward Gibbon, and James Boswell	Finalist	
2019	Victoria Riskin	Fay Wray and Robert Riskin: A Hollywood Memoir	Fay Wray, American actress (1907–2004), and Robert Riskin, American screenwriter and playwright (1897–1955)	Finalist	
2019	Yuval Taylor	Zora and Langston	Zora Neale Hurston, American folklorist, novelist, and short story writer (1891–1960), and Langston Hughes, American writer and social activist (1901–1967)	Finalist	
2019	Evan Thomas	First: Sandra Day O'Connor	Sandra Day O'Connor, United States Supreme Court justice (1930–)	Finalist	
2020	William Souder	Mad at the World: A Life of John Steinbeck	John Steinbeck, American writer (1902–1968)	Winner	
2020	Les Payne and Tamara Payne	The Dead Are Arising: The Life of Malcolm X	Malcolm X, African-American human rights activist (1925–1965)	Finalist	
2020	Heather Clark	Red Comet: The Short Life and Blazing Art of Sylvia Plath	Sylvia Plath, American poet, novelist and short story writer (1932–1963)	Finalist	
2020	Blake Gopnik	Warhol	Andy Warhol, American artist, film director, and producer (1928–1987)	Finalist	
2020	David Michaelis	Eleanor	Eleanor Roosevelt, First Lady of the United States from 1933 to 1945 (1884–1962)	Finalist	
2021	Paul Auster	Burning Boy: The Life and Work of Stephen Crane	Stephen Crane, American novelist, short story writer, poet, and journalist (1871–1900)	Winner	
2021	Nick Davis	Competing With Idiots: Herman and Joe Mankiewicz, A Dual Portrait	Herman Mankiewicz, American screenwriter (1897–1953) and Joseph L. Mankiewicz, American film director (1909–1993)	Finalist	
2021	Rebecca Donner	All the Frequent Troubles of Our Days: The True Story of the American Woman at the Heart of the German Resistance to Hitler	Mildred Harnack, American-German literary historian (1902–1943)	Finalist	
2021	Mark Harris	Mike Nichols: A Life	Mike Nichols, American television director, writer, producer and comedian (1931–2014)	Finalist	
2021	John Tresch	The Reason for the Darkness of the Night: Edgar Allan Poe and the Forging of American Science	Edgar Allan Poe, American writer and literary critic (1809–1849)	Finalist	
2022	Beverly Gage	G-Man: J. Edgar Hoover and the Making of the American Century	J. Edgar Hoover, American law-enforcement administrator (1895–1972)	Winner	
2022	Tomiko Brown-Nagin	Civil Rights Queen: Constance Baker Motley and the Struggle for Equality	Constance Baker Motley, American judge and politician (1921–2005)	Finalist	
2022	Jennifer Homans	Mr. B: George Balanchine's 20th Century	George Balanchine, Georgian-American ballet choreographer (1904–1983)	Finalist	
2022	David Maraniss	Path Lit by Lightning: The Life of Jim Thorpe	Jim Thorpe, American athlete (1887–1953)	Finalist	
2022	Robert Samuels and Toluse Olorunnipa	His Name Is George Floyd: One Man's Life and the Struggle for Racial Justice	George Floyd, African-American man murdered by police (1973–2020)	Finalist	
2023	Gregg Hecimovich	The Life and Times of Hannah Crafts: The True Story of The Bondwoman’s Narrative	Hannah Crafts, American writer	Winner	
2023	Leah Redmond Chang	Young Queens: Three Renaissance Women and the Price of Power		Finalist	
2023	Jonny Steinberg	Winnie and Nelson: Portrait of a Marriage		Finalist	
2023	Elizabeth R. Varon	Longstreet: The Confederate General Who Defied the South	James Longstreet, American general (1821–1904)	Finalist	
2023	David Waldstreicher	The Odyssey of Phillis Wheatley: A Poet’s Journeys Through American Slavery and Independence	Phillis Wheatley, African-American writer (c. 1753–1784)	Finalist	
