= Henry David Thoreau: A Life =

2017 biography by Laura Walls

- Author: Laura Dassow Walls
- Subject: Biography
- Publisher: University of Chicago Press
- Publication date: 2017
- Pages: 616

Henry David Thoreau: A Life is a 2017 biography of Henry David Thoreau by Laura Dassow Walls.

== Bibliography ==
- Birkett, Christopher (2018). "Review of Henry David Thoreau: A Life". Chicago Review. 62 (1/2/3): 396–400. ISSN 0009-3696. JSTOR 26725342.
- Gallagher, Mark (2018). "Review of Henry David Thoreau: A Life". The New England Quarterly. 91 (4): 705–707. doi:10.1162/tneq_r_00713. ISSN 0028-4866. JSTOR 26607965.
- Nelson, Max (2018). "This Matter To Which I Am Bound". The Threepenny Review. 152: 12–15. ISSN 0275-1410. JSTOR 26389448.
- Nossaman, Lucas (2018). "Review of Henry David Thoreau: A Life". Christianity and Literature. 67 (3): 583–586. doi:10.1177/0148333117732261. ISSN 0148-3331. JSTOR 26495292.
- Robinson, David M. (2017). "Henry David Thoreau: A Life. A Review". The Thoreau Society Bulletin (298): 12–13. ISSN 0040-6406. JSTOR 44651701.
- Taylor, Bob Pepperman (2018). "Review of Henry David Thoreau: A Life". Environmental Values. 27 (2): 206–208. doi:10.3197/096327118X15162907484484. ISSN 0963-2719. JSTOR 26535166.
- Thorson, Robert M. (2018). "Review of Henry David Thoreau: A Life". Environmental History. 23 (4): 922–924. doi:10.1093/envhis/emy076. ISSN 1084-5453. JSTOR 48554584.
