= Kirstin Downey =

American journalist and author

Kirstin Downey is an American journalist and author. She was a staff writer for The Washington Post from 1988 to 2008.

== Personal life ==
Downey was born in Abington, Pennsylvania. Because her parents were in the military, she moved around a lot throughout her childhood.

Downey attended Pennsylvania State University, where she studied journalism. In 2000, she received a Nieman fellowship at Harvard University, where she studied economic history at Harvard Business School. She also participated in the Harvard Trade Union Program.

Downey lives in Washington, D.C., with her husband (Neil Warner Averitt) and their five children.

== Career ==
Downey began her career in journalism, writing for newspapers in Florida and Colorado before moving to San Jose, California, to write for the San Jose Mercury. In 1988, she began writing for The Washington Post, where she continued working until she began studying economic history at Harvard University in 2000. After graduation, however, she returned to the Post. In 2009, she quit her job to finish her biography of Frances Perkins, The Woman Behind the New Deal, which was published in 2009 by Doubleday.

In 2010 and 2011, Downey wrote for the Financial Crisis Inquiry Commission.

In 2011, she became editor for FTC:WATCH, which was later purchased by MLex.

== Awards and honors ==
Downey won "several regional press association awards" for her "coverage of the aftermath of the savings-and-loan debacle of the late 1980s."

In 2008, she was among Washington Post staff members who received a Pulitzer Prize for Breaking News Reporting for their coverage of the 2007 Virginia Tech shooting. Her coverage included profiles of Drs. Liviu Librescu and Kevin Granata, professors who died protecting their students.

The Woman Behind the New Deal received starred reviews from Booklist and Publishers Weekly. The book was named one of the best nonfiction books of 2009 by the Library of Congress, the American Library Association, and NPR.

Isabella received a starred review from Kirkus Reviews, who wrote, "this rich, clearly written biography is a worthy chronicle of [Isabella's] impressive yet controversial life."

Awards for Downey's writing
Year	Title	Award	Result	Ref.
2009	The Woman Behind the New Deal	Los Angeles Times Book Prize for Biography	Shortlist	
2014	Isabella: The Warrior Queen	Los Angeles Times Book Prize for Biography	Shortlist	
2015	Isabella: The Warrior Queen	PEN/Jacqueline Bograd Weld Award for Biography	Longlist	

== Publications ==
- The Woman Behind the New Deal: The Life of Frances Perkins, FDR'S Secretary of Labor and His Moral Conscience (2009)
- A Promise to All Generations: Stories & Essays about Social Security & Frances Perkins (2011)
- Isabella: The Warrior Queen (2014)
- Plague Ship: The Untold Story of Captain Cook and His Legacy (2022)
