= John A. Farrell =

American author and historian

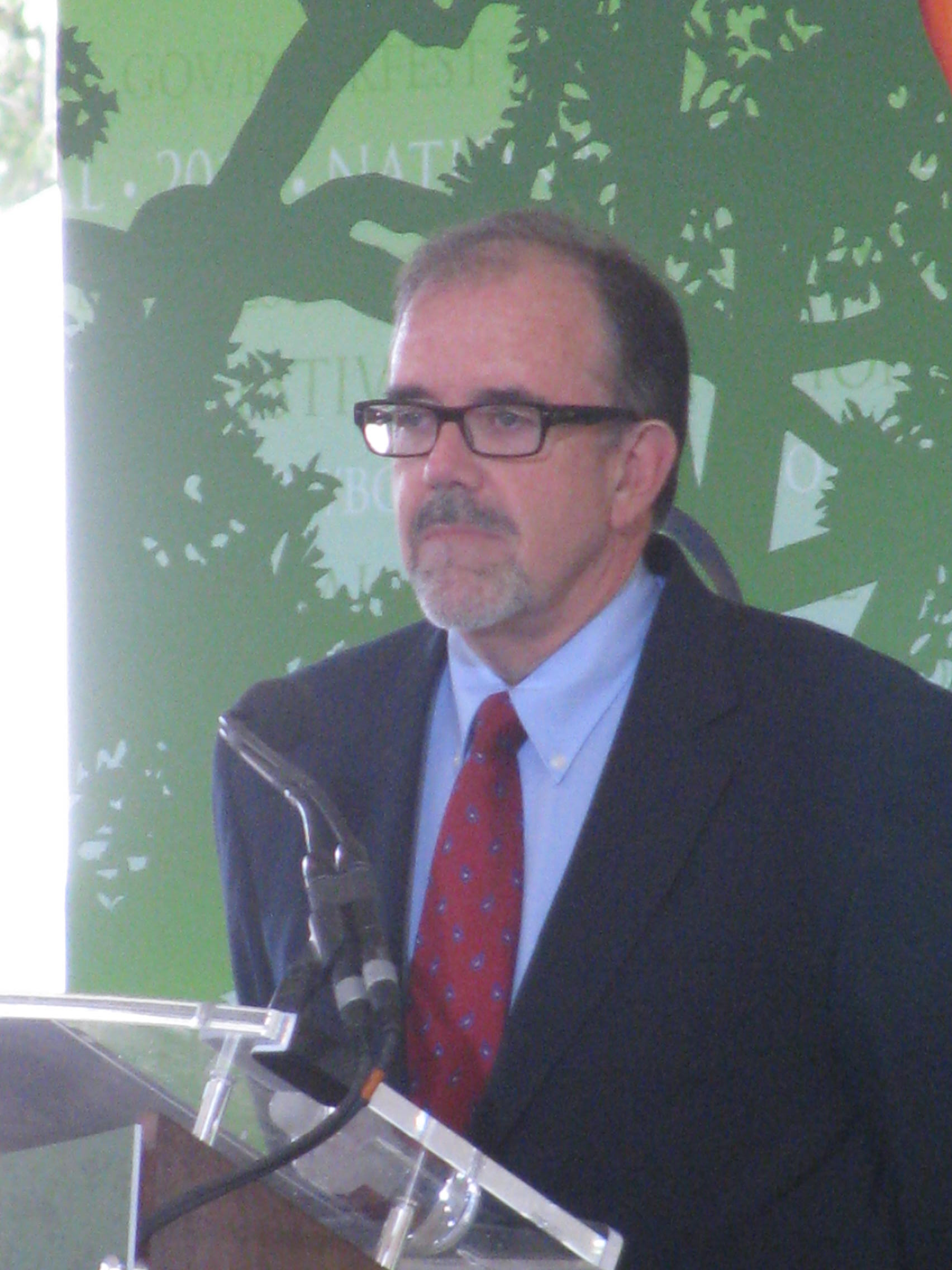
- John Farrell at the 2012 National Book Festival
- Education: University of Virginia
- Occupation: Writer
- Writing career
- Genre: Biography

John Aloysius Farrell is an American author and historian. He has written biographies of U.S. President Richard Nixon, Senator Ted Kennedy, House Speaker Thomas "Tip" O'Neill, and defense attorney Clarence Darrow. He is a former White House correspondent and Washington editor for The Boston Globe and a former Washington bureau chief and columnist for The Denver Post.

On January 2, 2017, The New York Times reported that Farrell had unearthed notes written by Nixon aide H. R. Haldeman, which confirmed that Nixon personally authorized "throwing a monkey wrench" into Lyndon Johnson's attempts to negotiate peace in Vietnam on the eve of the 1968 election. In his famous interviews with newsman David Frost, and elsewhere, Nixon had always denied any participation in what history has come to call the Chennault Affair - after Anna Chennault, the Nixon campaign's go-between with South Vietnam. Farrell's discovery earned praise from his peers.

On April 16, 2018 the Pulitzer Prize board announced that Richard Nixon: The Life was a finalist for the 2018 Pulitzer Prize in Biography.

On April 13, 2018, the New-York Historical Society awarded Farrell the title of "American Historian Laureate," and presented him with the $50,000 Barbara and David Zalaznick Book Prize in American History for Richard Nixon: The Life.

== Life ==
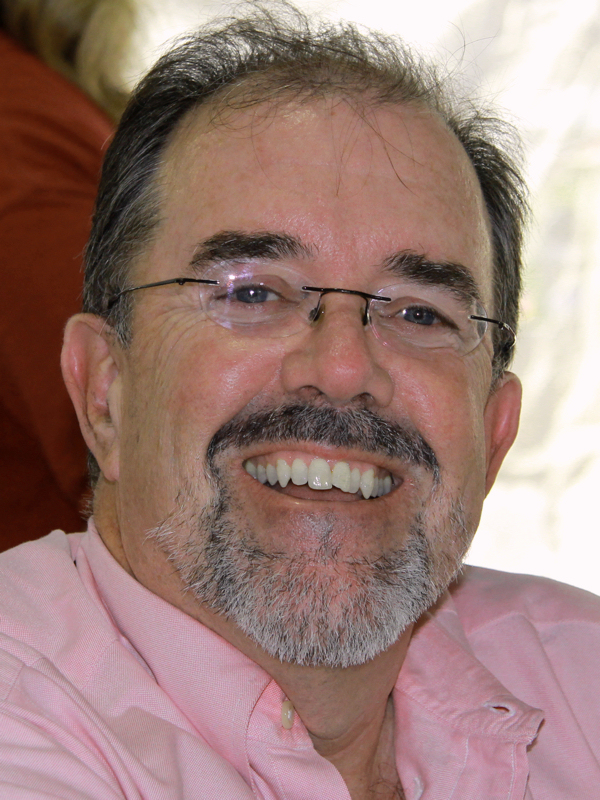
John A. Farrell at the 2011 Texas Book Festival.

Born in Huntington, New York, Farrell graduated from the University of Virginia in 1975 before working at newspapers in Montgomery County, Maryland, Annapolis and Baltimore. While at the Globe, he also worked as an investigative reporter on the vaunted "Spotlight" investigative unit. He has a PhD in history from the University of Groningen in the Netherlands.

Excerpts of his work have been published in Jack Beatty's collection Pols: Great Writers on American Politicians from Bryan to Reagan, and in Leadership for the Public Service by Richard A. Loverd. Farrell was a contributor, as well, to The Boston Globe's 2004 biography of United States Senator from Massachusetts John Kerry.

Farrell is an on-camera commentator in the PBS American Experience documentaries "Jimmy Carter" and "The Perfect Crime," a study of the Leopold and Loeb thrill-killers case, and in the television series The Irish in America.

== Journalistic awards and honors ==
- 1984 George Polk Award for investigative reporting of deaths caused by malfunctioning medical devices as part of a team at The Denver Post (List of George Polk Award winners)
- 1996 Gerald R. Ford Prize for coverage of the American Presidency for The Boston Globe
- 1996 Aldo Beckman Memorial Award for coverage of the American Presidency for The Boston Globe
- 2001 Raymond Clapper Memorial Award for reporting in The Boston Globe on flaws in the criminal justice system that lead to the conviction of innocent defendants

== Works ==
Title	Year	Publisher	ISBN	OCLC	Subject matter	Awards	Interviews and presentations
Tip O'Neill and the Democratic Century	2001	Little, Brown	ISBN 9780316185707	OCLC 50513431	Tip O'Neill	D.B. Hardeman Prize, 2001	Presentation by Farrell on Tip O'Neill and the Democratic Century, March 19, 2001, C-SPAN; Booknotes interview with Farrell on Tip O'Neill and the Democratic Century, May 20, 2001, C-SPAN
Clarence Darrow: Attorney for the Damned	2011	Doubleday	ISBN 9781921844256	OCLC 904728121	Clarence Darrow	Los Angeles Times Book Prize, winner in Biography, 2011	Presentation by Farrell on Clarence Darrow, July 14, 2011, C-SPAN; Presentation by Farrell on Clarence Darrow, September 23, 2012, C-SPAN
Richard Nixon: The Life	2017	Doubleday	ISBN 9780345804969	OCLC 989962433	Richard Nixon	Finalist, Pulitzer Prize for Biography, 2018; Barbara and David Zalaznick Book Prize in American History, New-York Historical Society; PEN/Jacqueline Bograd Weld Award for Biography, winner, 2018	Q&A interview with Farrell on Richard Nixon, April 9, 2017, C-SPAN; Discussion with Farrell on Richard Nixon, March 22, 2017, C-SPAN; Presentation by Farrell on Richard Nixon, September 2, 2017, C-SPAN; Presentation by Farrell on Richard Nixon, May 8, 2019, C-SPAN
Ted Kennedy: A Life	2022	Penguin Press	ISBN 9780525558071	OCLC 1320820101	Ted Kennedy		Presentation by Farrell on Ted Kennedy, October 27, 2022, C-SPAN; Q&A interview with Farrell on Ted Kennedy, November 13, 2022, C-SPAN
