= Benita Eisler =

American writer and educator (born 1937)

Benita Eisler (born July 24, 1937, in New York City) is an American writer and educator. She is best known for her biographies of historic figures, including Lord Byron, Georgia O'Keeffe, and George Catlin.

== Personal life ==
Eisler was born on July 24, 1937, in New York City to Morris Aaron and Frances Blitzer. She received a bachelor of arts degree from Smith College in 1958 and a master of arts degree from Harvard University in 1961. On June 23, 1961, she married Colin Eisler, and together, they have one daughter.

Eisler lives in Manhattan.

She is Jewish.

== Career ==
From 1975 to 1978, Eisler served as producer to WNET-TV, a public television station in New York City. She has also "worked as an art editor, reporter, on-camera correspondent, and producer of arts programming for [public] television."

Eisler edited The Lowell Offering, which was released in 1977. She published her first book, Class ACT, in 1983.

She has also taught nineteenth- and twentieth-century literature at Princeton University.

== Awards and honors ==
Byron: Child of Passion, Fool of Fame received a starred review from Booklist. Naked in the Marketplace received starred reviews from Booklist and Kirkus Reviews, who highlighted the way "Eisler skillfully incorporates much correspondence within a frame of lively writing."

Awards for Eisler's writing
Year	Title	Award	Result	Ref.
1991	O’Keeffe and Stieglitz: An American Romance	Los Angeles Times Book Prize for Biography	Finalist	
1999	Byron: Child of Passion, Fool of Fame	Los Angeles Times Book Prize for Biography	Finalist	
2013	The Red Man’s Bones: George Catlin, Artist and Showman	Los Angeles Times Book Prize for Biography	Finalist	

== Publications ==
=== As author ===
- Class ACT: America's Last Dirty Secret (1983)
- Private Lives: Men and Women of the Fifties (1986)
- O'Keeffe and Stieglitz: An American Romance (1991)
- Byron: Child of Passion, Fool of Fame (1999)
- Chopin's Funeral (2003)
- Naked in the Marketplace: The Lives of George Sand (2004)
- The Red Man's Bones: George Catlin, Artist and Showman (2013)

=== As editor ===
- The Lowell Offering: Writings by New England Mill Women (1840-1945) (1977)
