= Judith Thurman =

American writer (born 1946)

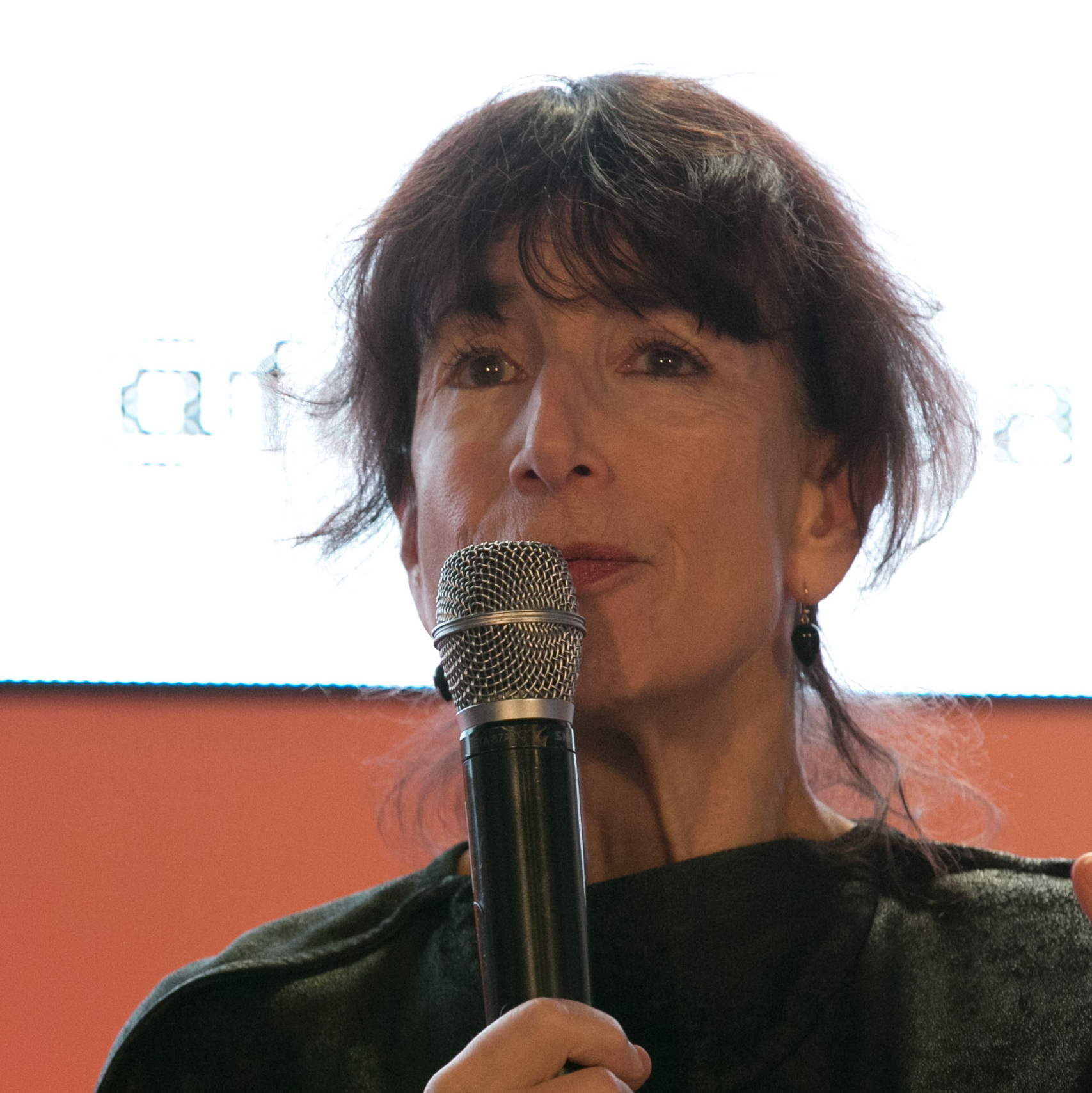
- Thurman in 2016
- Born: 1946 (age 79–80); New York City, U.S.
- Education: Brandeis University
- Occupations: Writer, critic
- Writing career
- Genres: Essay, biography

Judith Thurman (born 1946) is an American writer, biographer, and critic. She is the recipient of the 1983 National Book Award for Nonfiction for her biography Isak Dinesen: The Life of a Storyteller. Her book Secrets of the Flesh: A Life of Colette was a finalist for the 1999 nonfiction National Book Award. In 2016, she received the medal of Chevalier of the Order of Arts and Letters.

Thurman is a staff writer for The New Yorker.

== Early life ==
In 1967, Thurman graduated from Brandeis University with a bachelor's degree.

== Early work ==
Thurman began her literary career as a poet and translator. The Covent Garden Press in London published her first book of poems, Putting My Coat On, in 1972.

In the 1970s, Atheneum Books published I Became Alone, a book of essays on women poets for young people, and a volume of poetry for children, Flashlight, which has been regularly anthologized for more than forty years.

In 1973, Thurman returned to New York after five years in Europe and began to contribute to the newly launched Ms. magazine. Her essays introduced relatively unknown women writers to a new audience. They included the French poet Louise Labé and the Mexican poet Juana Inés de la Cruz. Thurman's translations of their work appeared in The Penguin Book of Women Poets. She also wrote about Gertrude Stein, Jean Rhys, Caryl Churchill, and Isak Dinesen, among others. Thurman worked at Brooklyn College as an adjunct professor from 1973 to 1975. For the remainder of the 1970s, Thurman had three publications while writing a biography.

== Writing career ==
=== Biographies ===
In the mid-1970s, Thurman began writing a biography on Isak Dinesen after being convinced by a representative from St. Martin's Press. During her eight-year writing process, Thurman stopped writing her biography after experiencing writer's block and anxiety. After resuming her writing, Thurman's biography, Isak Dinesen: The Life of A Storyteller, was published by St. Martin's Press in 1982. It won the National Book Award for Nonfiction in 1983, and served as the basis for Sydney Pollack's 1985 film Out of Africa, on which Thurman served as an associate producer.

Thurman took leave to write a biography titled Secrets of the Flesh: A Life of Colette, which was published by Alfred A. Knopf in 1999. The book was noted as "effective at setting the morally subversive Colette in the social milieu of early-20th-century Paris." The biography won the Los Angeles Times Book Award for biography and the Salon Book Award for biography.

=== The New Yorker ===
In 1987, Thurman began contributing to The New Yorker. In 2000, she returned to The New Yorker as a staff writer, where she has remained ever since, specializing in cultural criticism. A collection of her essays for the magazine, Cleopatra's Nose: 39 Varieties of Desire, was published by Farrar, Straus and Giroux in 2007, and was a New York Times Best Book of the Year. Her article "Swann Song", about French fashion designer Yves Saint Laurent, was published in The Best American Essays of 2003.

Other notable articles for The New Yorker include: "Exposure Time" (2003), "The Roving Eye" (2008), "First Impressions" (2008), "Drawn from Life" (2012), and "The Supreme Contradictions of Simone Weil" (2024).

Thurman is a recipient of the Harold G. Vursell Award for prose style from the American Academy of Arts and Letters; the Order of Arts and Letters, from the French government; and the Rungstedlund Award from the Karen Blixen Museum.

=== Prizes ===
==== Won ====
- National Book Award for Nonfiction, 1983
- Salon Book Award for Biography, 1999
- Los Angeles Times Book Prize for Biography, 1999
- Harold G. Vursell Award from the American Academy of Arts and Letters for Prose Style
- Bard College's Mary McCarthy Prize for a Woman Writer's Life Work
- Rungstedlund Prize from the Royal Danish Academy
- Chevalier de l'Ordre des Arts et des Lettres
- PEN/Diamonstein-Spielvogel Award for the Art of the Essay, 2022

==== Finalist ====
- National Book Award for Nonfiction, 1999

== Bibliography ==
=== Poetry ===
- Putting My Coat On. London: Covent Garden Press. 1972.

=== Biographies ===
- Isak Dinesen : the life of a storyteller. 1983.
- Secrets of the Flesh: A Life of Colette (1999)

=== Essay collections ===
- Cleopatra's Nose: 39 Varieties of Desire. New York: Farrar, Straus and Giroux. 2007.
- A Left-Handed Woman. New York: Farrar, Straus and Giroux. 2022.

=== Essays and reporting ===
- "Swann Song", 2002
- "The Divine Marquise", 2003
- "The Roving Eye", 2008
- "Counterfeit Roth". The Talk of the Town. Ink. The New Yorker. 86 (8): 22–23. April 5, 2010.
- "Roth on Trump". The Talk of the Town. What-If Dept. The New Yorker. 92 (47): 18–19. January 30, 2017. (Note: Online version is titled "Philip Roth e-mails on Trump".)
- "An Unfinished Woman: The desires of Margaret Fuller". The Critics. Books. April 1, 2013. The New Yorker. 96 (21): 54–59. July 27, 2020. (Note: Online version is titled "The desires of Margaret Fuller"; first published in the April 1, 2013 issue.)
- "Eye of the needle". Annals of Fashion. The New Yorker. 97 (6): 44–55. March 29, 2021. (Note: Online version is titled "Ann Lowe's barrier-breaking mid-century couture".)
- "Asylum seeker: seven centuries after Dante's death, are we finally ready for Dante?". The Critics. A Critic at Large. The New Yorker. 97 (29): 72–77. September 20, 2021. (Note: Online version is titled "Reading Dante's Purgatory while the world hangs in the balance".)
- "How Emily Wilson Made Homer Modern". The New Yorker. 11 September 2023. ISSN 0028-792X.

=== Critical studies and reviews of Thurman's work ===
- The New York Review of Books, "Writing the Furies".
- The New York Times, "Fluent in the Language of Style"
- The New York Times, "Lost Women"
- London Review of Books, "Yes You, Sweetheart"
- The New York Times, "So Saucy, in Her Life and Her Work"
- The New York Times, "A Tale of Destiny"
- The New York Review of Books, "The Eight Gothic Tale"

———————
