= T. H. Watkins =

Thomas Henry Watkins (March 29, 1936 — February 23, 2000) was an American magazine editor and author primarily between the 1960s to 1990s. As an editor, Watkins primarily worked for The Wilderness Society as their Wilderness editor from 1982 to 1997. Additional magazines Watkins edited for were The American West and American Heritage. With these two magazines, Watkins was an associate editor and senior editor.

As a writer, Watkins primarily wrote about Western United States while also releasing two books about the Great Depression. As a biographer, Watkins published a 1991 book about Harold L. Ickes titled Righteous Pilgrim: The Life and Times of Harold Ickes, 1874-1952. That year, Righteous Pilgrim won the Los Angeles Times Book Prize for Biography. His book was also nominated for the 1990 National Book Award for Nonfiction and the 1991 National Book Critics Circle Award for Biography. Apart from writing, Watkins became a Wallace Stegner Distinguished Professor of Western American Studies for Montana State University in the late 1990s.

== Early life and education ==
Watkins was born in Loma Linda, California on March 29, 1936. During his childhood, Watkins grew up with five siblings. He was an american football player in high school before he continued playing the sport while attending San Bernardino Valley College.

For additional post-secondary education between the mid-1950s to mid 1960s, Watkins went to the University of Redlands and San Francisco State College. For his bachelor's degree, Watkins studied history and English at Redlands. At San Francisco State, Watkins was taught anthropology and history before he withdrew from his program.

== Career ==
=== Early positions and writing ===
While at Redlands, Watkins bundled together newspapers with his father. Before he went to San Francisco State, Watkins was hired by the San Francisco Chronicle to work in their mailroom. Between the late 1950s to early 1960s, Watkins began his career as an author. During this time period, Watkins did not release any of his short stories and novels that he had completed.

From the late 1960s to early 2000s, Watkins primarily wrote about California and other parts of the Western United States. Additional geographical topics Watkins wrote about include the Colorado River and the Mississippi River. In 1990, Watkins published a biography on Harold L. Ickes with over a thousand pages. For his book, Watkins included political events between the 1920s to 1940s while also including background information on the United States Department of the Interior. To write his biography, Watkins consulted Ickes's diary as part of his research.

In 1993, Watkins released The Great Depression: America in the 1930s. His book was converted into a television series for the Public Broadcasting System that year. An additional book on the Great Depression, The Hungry Years: A Narrative History of the Great Depression in America, was published by Watkins in 1999. While at Montana State, Watkins was in the process of writing a biography about Wallace Stegner. Upon his death in 2000, Watkins had not completed his biography of Stegner.

=== Editing and academics ===
Upon becoming a magazine editor in 1966, Watkins worked for eleven years at The American West. He continued his editing career with American Heritage for an additional six years upon joining the magazine in 1976. His positions for these magazines included associate editor and senior editor. In 1982, Watkins joined The Wilderness Society as their Wilderness editor. He continued to edit for the magazine until 1997. Apart from editing, Watkins was hired by Montana State University in 1997 as their Wallace Stegner Distinguished Professor of Western American Studies. He continued to work at Montana State in his professor position until his death in 2000.

== Awards and honors ==
In 1991, Righteous Pilgrim: The Life and Times of Harold Ickes, 1874-1952 won the Los Angeles Times Book Prize for Biography. Righteous Pilgrim was also nominated for the National Book Award for Nonfiction in 1990 and the National Book Critics Circle Award for Biography/Autobiography in 1991. The Wilderness Society gave Watkins the Robert Marshall Award in 1988. Watkins was named into the SBVC Alumni Association Hall Of Fame in 1989.

== Death and personal life ==
On February 23, 2000, Watkins died from colon cancer. He had two children, Kevin & Lisa, and was married to 2nd wife Joan upon his death at Bozeman, Montana.
