= Burning Boy =

2021 biography of Stephen Crane by Paul Auster

Burning Boy: The Life and Work of Stephen Crane
- Author: Paul Auster
- Language: English
- Genre: Biography non-fiction
- Publisher: Henry Holt and Company
- Publication date: October 26, 2021
- Publication place: United States
- Award: Los Angeles Times Book Prize for Biography
- ISBN: 978-0-7710-9692-1

Burning Boy: The Life and Work of Stephen Crane is a biographical book on Stephen Crane by Paul Auster which was published on October 26, 2021.

== Awards ==
- Los Angeles Times Book Prize for Biography in 2021
