= Longstreet: The Confederate General Who Defied the South =

Longstreet: The Confederate General Who Defied the South is a non-fiction book by Elizabeth R. Varon, published in 2023 by Simon & Schuster. It is about James Longstreet.

Branda Wineapple, in a book review in The New York Times, wrote that the work "is not so much about Longstreet’s character or his motivations [...] but about a symbolic Longstreet" related to the disputes about history after the American Civil War, especially how different people perceived him differently.

The book has more content about Longstreet's activities after the Civil War, in the Reconstruction Era, compared to his activities during the war. Varon also argued that people in the Southern United States chose to suppress the memory of Longstreet because of his postbellum pro-civil rights activism.

== Background ==
Varon consulted writings by historians and their evaluations of Longstreet's ability in the war in order to develop her summative view.

== Content ==
The book chronicles how Longstreet's family made amends with the family of Ulysses S. Grant.

== Reception ==
Brenda Wineapple argued that the book leans "far more toward historiography than biography." She praised the book's coverage of the political atmosphere of Louisiana after the United States Civil War.

Peter Cozzens, in The Wall Street Journal, argued that the book should have had more focus on Longstreet during the Civil War versus his postwar activities. Cozzens also argued that Varon should have created her own analysis of Longstreet's ability in the war. According to Cozzens, the book works well with Longstreet's post-war history.

Alex Beam argued that the book is "fascinating reading".

Matthew E. Stanley, in The Jacobin, argued that Varon "skillfully" highlighted the "complexities" in the post-Civil War United States.
