= Gay Wilson Allen =

American academic and writer (1903–1995)

Gay Wilson Allen (August 23, 1903 – August 6, 1995) was an American academic and writer. After holding assistant and associate professorships between the late 1920s to mid 1930s, Allen was hired by Bowling Green University in 1935 as an associate professor. Upon leaving for New York University in 1946, Allen was an English professor until 1969. Apart from working as a visiting scholar until the late 1970s, Allen was on a literary trip with William Faulkner that was sponsored by the United States Department of State during 1955.

As an author, Allen primarily focused on Walt Whitman with his writings between the early 1940s to late 1990s. Of his Whitman works, Allen was a lead editor on The Collected Writings of Walt Whitman, which was released in twenty two books. For his biographies, some of his subjects included Whitman, William James, Ralph Waldo Emerson and J. Hector St. John de Crèvecœur. With The Solitary Singer: A Critical Biography of Walt Whitman, Allen was nominated for the 1956 National Book Award for Nonfiction. For Waldo Emerson: A Biography, Allen was nominated for the 1982 Pulitzer Prize for Biography and won the Los Angeles Times Book Prize for Biography the same year. Allen received two Guggenheim Fellowships in the 1950s and became part of the New Jersey Literary Hall of Fame in 1983.

== Early life and education ==
Allen was born in Lake Junaluska, North Carolina on August 23, 1903. During his childhood, Allen lived in the Canton, North Carolina neighborhood. Allen was hired by The Canton Chronicle in his teenage years and was a newspaper reporter. For his post-secondary education, Allen attended Duke University in the 1920s and the University of Wisconsin in the 1930s.

== Career ==
=== Literary ===
==== Early writing and Whitman ====
Allen worked as a potato farmer during his childhood. While farming, Allen used a typewriter to create an essay about an opossum for his literary debut during the mid 1910s. In 1988, Allen said "[if he] had bought a microscope, [he] might have turned out to be a scientist" instead. Between the 1930s to 1980s, Allen primarily wrote about Walt Whitman.

For his career on Whitman, Allen started out with the 1943 publication of Twenty-Five Years of Walt Whitman Bibliography: 1918-1942. In 1946, Allen released Walt Whitman Handbook. With his publication, Allen said he wanted to provide "a better, more correct interpretation" about Whitman while teaching at New York University. During updates in 1975 and 1986, his handbook was renamed to the New Walt Whitman Handbook. In later publications, multiple of his Whitman works were re-released as re-edited or expanded versions. These included Walt Whitman in 1969 and Aspects of Walt Whitman in 1977.

In 1955, Allen began a multi-book project on works by Whitman for New York University Press. While Allen worked as one of the lead editors on The Collected Writings of Walt Whitman, his collection was completed in 1984 after twenty two books. In 1990, Allen started to remake Walt Whitman Abroad with Ed Folsom, which was originally released in 1955. During the proofreading stage, Allen died before the book was to be republished as Walt Whitman and the World. Walt Whitman and the World was posthumously released in 1996.

==== Biographies and other works ====
In 1949, Allen started working on his Whitman biography and took seven years before he published the book. The Solitary Singer: A Critical Biography of Walt Whitman was published in 1955 before the 100th anniversary of the release of Leaves of Grass by Whitman. In 1967, Allen released a biography about William James.

At the start of the 1970s, Allen wrote a biography about Herman Melville and a pamphlet on Carl Sandburg. For his 1980s biographies, Allen published a book about Ralph Waldo Emerson in 1981. Allen and Roger Asselineau released their biography on J. Hector St. John de Crèvecœur, titled St. John be Crèveccouer: The Life of an American Farmer, in 1987. Apart from biographies, Allen wrote about Korney Chukovsky and Charles E. Feinberg during the late 1980s.

=== Academic ===
In a 1991 essay, Allen said he "had not planned an academic career...as a teacher of American literature". Allen began his English teaching experience in 1929 at Lake Erie College as an assistant professor before continuing for a year with Alabama Polytechnic Institute in 1931. In 1934, he became an associate professor for Shurtleff College. After joining Bowling Green State University in 1935, he remained there until he was hired by New York University in 1946. Allen continued his academic career at New York until 1969.

For these two universities, Allen worked as an associate professor for Bowling Green and an English professor for New York. In 1969, Allen held his academic position at New York as an emeritus. As a visiting scholar between the late 1960s to late 1970s, Allen was hired by Harvard University and Emory University. Additional academic institutions Allen worked for included the University of Texas and the University of Hawaii. Outside of the United States, Allen taught in Japan with William Faulkner during a 1955 literary trip sponsored by the United States Department of State.

== Writing process and reception ==
For The Solitary Singer, Allen and his wife co-created the manuscript and conducted research at a storage facility owned by the Brooklyn Eagle. Allen additionally consulted over a thousand publications on Whitman during the research stage. Allen rewrote his draft multiple times prior to the release of his book on Whitman. While conducting research for William James: A Biography, Allen used private letters from the James family. He also created a smaller teaching version of his James biography for schools.

When Ralph L. Rusk released his 1949 publication Life of Ralph Waldo Emerson, Allen believed it was "weak on the intimate, personal life". For Waldo Emerson, A Biography, Allen included information that was not included in the Emerson biography written by Rusk. To write his biography on Emerson, Allen used thousands of unpublished letters. In a review by The Philadelphia Inquirer, David R. Contosta said Allen and Asselineau had included inaccuracies on the 18th century while providing a historical background in their Crèvecœur biography.

== Awards and honors ==
During his teens, Allen received an essay collection of Emerson works for his opossum essay. Allen was given a Guggenheim Fellowship for American literature in 1952 and 1959. In 1956, Allen was nominated for the National Book Award for Nonfiction in 1956 with The Solitary Singer. In 1969, Edwin Haviland Miller announced he would release The Artistic Legacy of Walt Whitman: A Tribute to Gay Wilson Allen before it was published the following year. In 1977, Allen was chosen as a recipient for an American literature award from the Modern Language Association.

Allen received the James Russell Lowell Prize from the MLA for Waldo Emerson: A Biography in 1981. In 1982, Allen won the Los Angeles Times Book Prize for Biography with Waldo Emerson: A Biography. That year, Waldo Emerson was nominated for the Pulitzer Prize for Biography. After the National Book Awards were replaced with the American Book Awards, Waldo Emerson was a 1982 nominee in the Autobiography/Biography category for hardcover books. Allen became part of the New Jersey Literary Hall of Fame in 1983.

== Personal life and death ==
In 1988, Allen left Oradell to live in Raleigh, North Carolina. He died there on August 6, 1995, from pneumonia. Allen was previously married and had no children.
