= Mark Stevens (art critic) =

American writer (born 1951)

- Born: August 14, 1951 (age 75); New York City
- Education: Princeton University (BA), King's College, Cambridge (MA)
- Occupations: Art critic, author
- Spouse: Annalyn Swan
- Writing career
- Genre: Biography
- Notable work: de Kooning: An American Master
- Notable awards: Pulitzer Prize for Biography or Autobiography
- Website: www.stevensandswan.com

Mark Stevens (born August 14, 1951) is an American writer who was co-awarded the 2005 Pulitzer Prize for Biography or Autobiography with Annalyn Swan for de Kooning: An American Master. His book with Swan also received the National Book Critics Circle Award for Biography in 2004 and the Los Angeles Times Book Prize for Biography in 2005. During his writing career, Stevens was an art critic for Newsweek, The New Republic and New York between the 1970s to 2000s. Other publications by Stevens include a 1981 work on Richard Diebenkorn's art and a 1984 book called Summer of the City.

== Early life and education ==
On August 14, 1951, Stevens was born in New York City. For his post-secondary education, Stevens received a Bachelor of Arts from Princeton University in 1973 and a Master of Arts from King's College in 1975.

== Career ==
Stevens began his writing career as a freelancer in 1975 before becoming an art critic for Newsweek in 1977. He remained at Newsweek until August 1988 while expanding his writings with The New Republic and Vanity Fair. At The New Republic, Stevens started critiquing art in 1986 before continuing his art critic career with New York in 1996. Stevens remained with the magazine until his resignation in 2007.

Outside of art, Stevens published a work about Richard Diebenkorn's artworks in 1981. In 1984, he released his first book Summer of the City in 1984 while writing for Newsweek. In 1989, Stevens and his wife Annalyn Swan signed with Bantam Books for a future biography about Willem de Kooning. After spending ten years on the writing process, de Kooning: An American Master was released in 2004 by Alfred A. Knopf.

In 2008, Stevens and Swan reached a deal with Knopf for a future Francis Bacon biography. The resulting work, Francis Bacon: Revelations, was published in 2021 with HarperCollins (UK) and Knopf (US).

== Awards and honors ==
In 2004, Stevens and Swan won the National Book Critics Circle Award for Biography with de Kooning: An American Master. The following year, Stevens and his wife won the 2005 Pulitzer Prize for Biography or Autobiography and the Los Angeles Times Book Prize for Biography with their de Kooning book. Their book also received the Ambassador Book Award in the Biography & Autobiography category that year. During 2007, Stevens was a fellow at the New York Public Library.
