= De Kooning: An American Master =

2004 biography of Willem de Kooning

de Kooning: An American Master
- Author: Mark Stevens and Annalyn Swan
- Language: English
- Subject: Willem de Kooning
- Genre: Biography
- Publisher: Alfred A. Knopf
- Publication date: November 9, 2004
- Media type: Print
- Pages: 752 (hardcover)
- Awards: 2005 Pulitzer Prize
- ISBN: 978-1400041756
- Dewey Decimal: 709'2—dc22
- LC Class: N6537.D43S74 2004

de Kooning: An American Master is a biography of Dutch American painter Willem de Kooning, a prominent figure in the American movement of abstract expressionism, specially in the 1940s and 1950s. Often compared to Jackson Pollock and Arshile Gorky, de Kooning was considered one of the more inspirational and influential artists of the 20th century. The book, which is the first comprehensive biography presenting both de Kooning's personal life and career, was written by authors by Mark Stevens and Annalyn Swan. In 2005, the book was honored with the 2005 Pulitzer Prize for Biography or Autobiography.

== Reception ==
Metacritic's summary reads: "Critics unreservedly praise Stevens’s and Swan’s opus as a masterpiece in art writing, a landmark biography, and a fascinating look at early 20th-century New York".

== Honors and awards ==
- 2004 Los Angeles Times Book Prize (Biography)
- 2004 National Book Critics Circle Awards
- 2005 Pulitzer Prize for Biography or Autobiography
- 2005 Ambassador Book Award
