= Ernst Pawel =

German translator

Ernst Pawel (January 23, 1920 – August 16, 1994) was a German American biographer, novelist, and translator who worked primarily for New York Life Insurance from 1946 to 1982. Pawel wrote about the Holocaust and Sigmund Freud in three novels from 1951 to 1960. From 1954 to 1965 Pawel translated books by Georges Simenon and Lotte Lehman.

During the 1980s, Pavel released biographies of Franz Kafka and Theodor Herzl. Following his death in 1994, Pawel's biography of Heinrich Heine and his own memoir were released. The Nightmare of Reason: A Life of Franz Kafka won the Los Angeles Times Book Prize for Biography and was nominated for the American Book Award for Nonfiction in 1984.

== Early life and education ==
Pawel was born in Breslau, Germany on January 23, 1920, to Jewish parents. After Adolf Hitler took over Germany in 1933, Pawel went to Yugoslavia with his mother and father. While in Belgrade during his teens, Pawel worked at a bookstore. He also "joined clandestine Communist and Zionist youth groups". During the late 1930s, Pawel moved to the United States. For his post-secondary education, Pawel went to City College and the New School for Social Research.

== Career ==
=== Positions ===
Pawel began working for the Serbian Daily while he lived in New York. Pawel was part of the Office of Strategic Services during World War II. Throughout the war, Pawel was a translator from the early to mid 1940s. After being hired by New York Life Insurance in 1946, Pawel expanded his career to public relations while continuing to work in translation. While at New York Life, Pawel wanted to leave during the first month of his position, but he stayed with the company until 1982.

=== Works ===
Pawel wrote about the Holocaust in The Island in Time. This 1951 book took place at a fictional Italian refugee camp. Pawel set his 1957 book From the Dark Tower at an American insurance company. It was about the main character's behavioral changes after the suicide of his boss. In 1960, Pawel released In the Absence of Magic. Taking place on an island, it was about two former followers of Sigmund Freud.

Pawel co-translated poetry by Georges Simenon in 1954. In 1964, Pawel translated a book by Lotte Lehmann about Richard Strauss's operas. The following year, Pawel translated a book on nuclear strategy by Raymond Aron.

In 1984 Pawel wrote The Nightmare of Reason: A Life of Franz Kafka. In this book, Pawel included a "political and social background of ... turn-of-the-century Prague". In 1989, Pawel released The Labyrinth of Exile: A Life of Theodor Herzl. In a review by the Boston Globe, Harry Zohn said Pawel "[editorialized], [vented] some of his personal prejudices and [made] misstatements" with his Herzl book.

In 1995, Pawel's Life in Dark Ages: A Memoir and The Poet Dying: Heinrich Heine's Last Years in Paris were posthumously published, his daughter having completed the memoir. In Life in Dark Ages: A Memoir, Pawel wrote about his life from the 1920s to the 1940s.

== Nomination and awards ==
When the American Book Awards replaced the National Book Awards during the 1980s, Pawel was nominated for the 1984 American Book Award for Nonfiction with The Nightmare of Reason. That year, The Nightmare of Reason received the Los Angeles Times Book Prize for Biography. In 1985, Pawel received the Alfred Harcourt Award for The Nightmare of Reason.

== Personal life and death ==
Pawel had two children during his marriage. On August 16, 1994, he died in Great Neck, New York from lung cancer.
