= Elizabeth Varon =

American historian

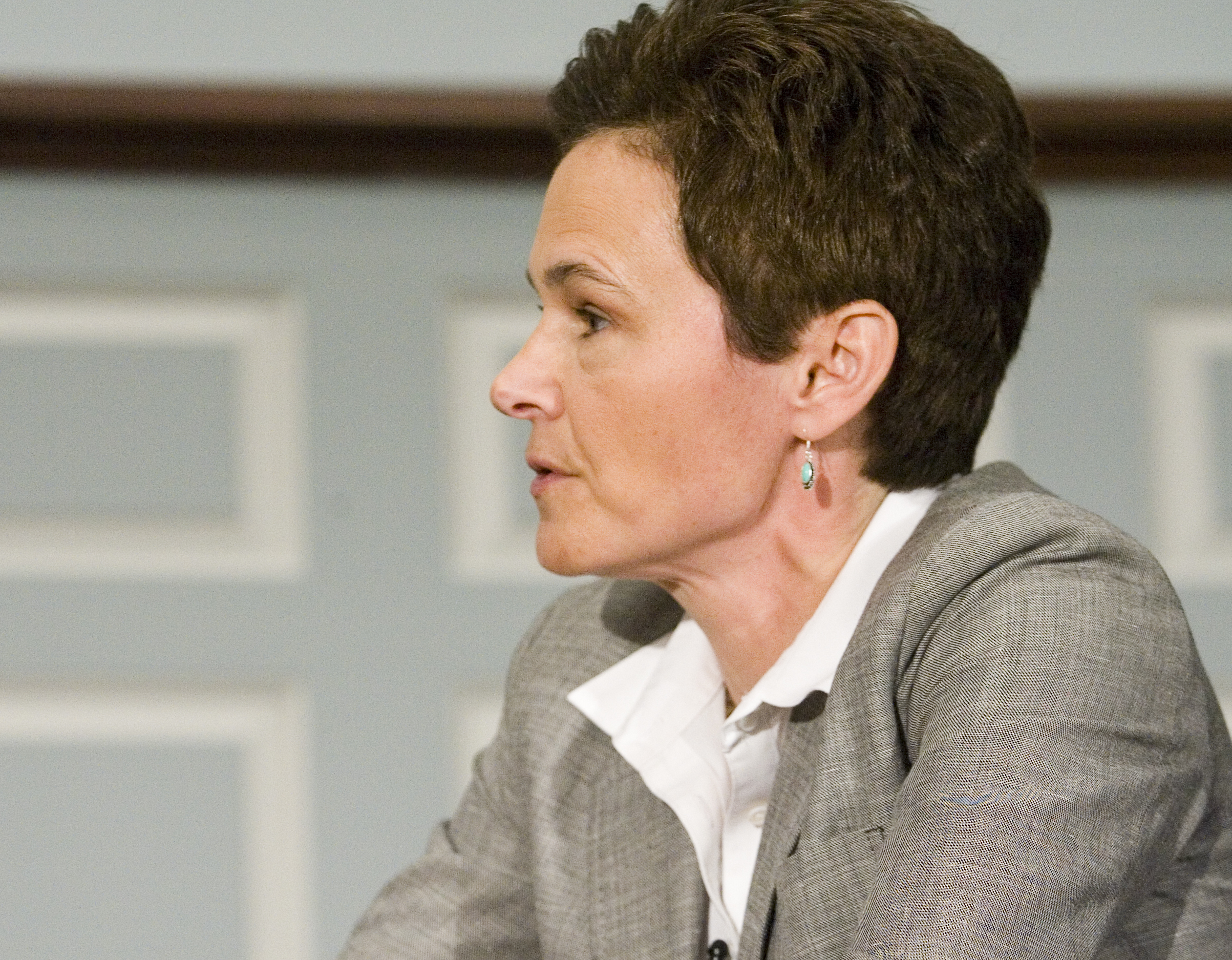
- Born: Elizabeth R. Varon; December 16, 1963 (age 61)
- Education: Swarthmore College; Yale University
- Occupation: Professor
- Employer: University of Virginia
- Spouse: William I. Hitchcock
- Children: 2

Elizabeth R. Varon (born December 16, 1963) is an American historian, and Langbourne M. Williams Professor of American History at the University of Virginia.

== Life ==
Varon graduated from Swarthmore College (B.A.,1985), and from Yale University, (Ph.D., 1993). She was professor of history at Wellesley College, and Temple University. She is an Organization of American Historians lecturer. She was co-director of the Society for Historians of the Early American Republic.

Varon served as the Harold Vyvyan Harmsworth Professor of American History at the University of Oxford for the 2023-24 academic year.

She and her husband, William I. Hitchcock, reside in Charlottesville, Virginia. They have two children.

== Works ==
- We Mean to Be Counted: White Women and Politics in Antebellum Virginia. Univ of North Carolina Press. 1998. ISBN 978-0-8078-6608-5.
- Southern Lady, Yankee Spy: The True Story of Elizabeth Van Lew, a Union Agent in the Heart of the Confederacy, Oxford University Press, USA, 2003, ISBN 9780195142280
- Disunion!: The Coming of the American Civil War, 1789-1859. Univ of North Carolina Press. 1 November 2008. ISBN 978-0-8078-8718-9.
- Appomattox: Victory, Defeat, and Freedom at the End of the Civil War. Oxford University Press, USA. 6 September 2013. pp. 4–. ISBN 978-0-19-934792-6.
- Armies of Deliverance: A New History of the Civil War. Oxford University Press. 2019. ISBN 978-0-19-086060-8.
- Longstreet: The Confederate General Who Defied the South. Simon & Schuster. 2023. ISBN 978-19-8214827-0.
