= Under My Skin (autobiography) =

1994 autobiography by Doris Lessing

- First edition
- Author: Doris Lessing
- Publisher: HarperCollins
- Publication place: United Kingdom

Under My Skin: Volume One of My Autobiography, to 1949 (1994) was the first volume of Doris Lessing's autobiography, covering the period of her life from birth in 1919 to leaving Southern Rhodesia (now Zimbabwe) in 1949.

Although Lessing describes her fiction as not autobiographical, in this volume she makes explicit comparisons between herself and the leading character, Martha Quest, of the Children of Violence series.

The second volume of Lessing's autobiography appeared in 1997: Walking in the Shade: Volume II of my Autobiography (1949–1962).
