= William J. Cooper Jr. =

American historian (born 1940)

- Born: October 22, 1940 (age 85); Kingstree, South Carolina, U.S.
- Occupation: Historian
- Spouse: Patricia Holmes
- Parent(s): William J. Cooper, Sr. and Mamie Mayes Cooper

Academic background
- Education: Johns Hopkins University
- Academic advisor: David Herbert Donald

William J. Cooper Jr. (born October 22, 1940) is an American historian who specializes in the history of the American South, and is regarded as a leading expert on the life of Jefferson Davis.

== Early life and education ==
Cooper studied at Princeton University and Johns Hopkins University.

== Career ==
After two years of service as an officer in the United States Army, he went on to spend his entire academic career at Louisiana State University.

=== Works ===
External videos
- Booknotes interview with Cooper on Jefferson Davis, American, April 8, 2001, C-SPAN
- Presentation by Cooper on We Have the War Upon Us, September 25, 2012, C-SPAN

- The Conservative Regime: South Carolina, 1877-1890 (1968)
- The South and the Politics of Slavery, 1828-56 (1979)
- Liberty and Slavery (1983)
- The American South: A History (1996) (with Tom E. Terrill)
- Jefferson Davis, American (2000)
- Jefferson Davis and the Civil War Era (2008)
- We Have the War Upon Us: The Onset of the Civil War, November 1860-April 1861 (2012)
- The Lost Founding Father: John Quincy Adams and the Transformation of American Politics (2017)
- Approaching Civil War and Southern History (2019)
