= Annalyn Swan =

American writer and biographer (born 1951)

- Born: 1951 (age 74–75); Biloxi, Mississippi
- Education: Princeton University, King's College, Cambridge (MA)
- Occupations: Author; editor; professor
- Spouse: Mark Stevens
- Writing career
- Genre: Biography
- Notable works: de Kooning: An American Master, Francis Bacon: Revelations
- Notable awards: Pulitzer Prize for Biography or Autobiography
- Website: www.stevensandswan.com

Annalyn Swan (born ca. 1951 in Biloxi, Mississippi) is an American writer and biographer who has written extensively about the arts. With her husband, art critic Mark Stevens, she is the author of de Kooning: An American Master (2004), a biography of Dutch-American artist Willem de Kooning, which was awarded the 2005 Pulitzer Prize for Biography or Autobiography. De Kooning also won the National Book Critics Circle prize for biography and the Los Angeles Times biography award, and was named one of the 10 best books of 2005 by The New York Times. In her review in The New York Times, Janet Maslin wrote: "The elusiveness of its subject makes the achievements of de Kooning: An American Master that much more dazzling."

A Phi Beta Kappa graduate of Princeton University (Class of 1973), Swan was the first woman editor-in-chief of The Daily Princetonian. She was named a Marshall Scholar and earned her master's degree at King's College, Cambridge. She began her writing career at Time, then joined Newsweek in 1980 as music critic, becoming the magazine's senior arts editor in 1983. In 1986–1990 she was editor-in-chief of Savvy, a magazine for professional women. She later taught at Princeton University, where she was named a trustee in 1999.

Swan has written for numerous publications, including The New Republic and Vanity Fair, and is the winner of an ASCAP-Deems Taylor Award and a Front Page Award for her music criticism. She is currently visiting professor and serves on the advisory boards at the Leon Levy Biography Center at the Graduate Center, the City University of New York. Swan was named "Biloxian Made Good" in 2011.

In 2021, Swan and Mark Stevens published a biography of the British artist Francis Bacon, Francis Bacon: Revelations, with HarperCollins (UK) and Knopf (US). They have two children.

== Works ==
- Mark Stevens; Willem De Kooning; Annalyn Swan (2004). De Kooning: An American Master. A.A. Knopf. ISBN 978-1-4000-4175-6.
- Peter W. Bernstein; Annalyn Swan (December 2, 2008). All the Money in the World. Knopf Doubleday Publishing Group. ISBN 978-0-307-26770-2.
- Annalyn Swan; Mark Stevens (2020). Francis Bacon: Revelations. HarperCollins. ISBN 9780007298419.
