= Michael Scammell =

English author, biographer and translator of Slavic literature

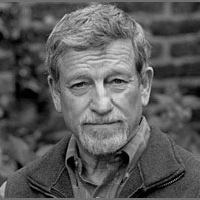
- Michael Scammell (ca. 2009)
- Born: January 16, 1935 (age 91); Lyndhurst, Hampshire, England
- Education: PhD in Slavic Studies from Columbia University
- Alma mater: B.A. in Slavic Studies, University of Nottingham
- Occupations: Author; biographer; translator
- Spouse: Rosemary Nossif
- Writing career
- Language: English
- Period: 1965 – present
- Notable awards: Los Angeles Times, Silver PEN, PEN/Jacqueline Bograd Weld, Spears Magazine
- Website: michaelscammell.com

Michael Scammell (born 16 January 1935) is an English author, biographer and translator of Slavic literature.

== Education ==
Michael Scammell was born in Lyndhurst, Hampshire, England, attended Brockenhurst Grammar School, and after two years working as a copy boy for the Southern Daily Echo in Southampton, was drafted into the British army, spending most of his time at the Joint Services School for Linguists in Cambridge and Bodmin, where he was trained as a Russian interpreter. In 1958 he earned a B.A. degree with first class honors in Slavic Studies from the University of Nottingham, and edited the student newspaper, The Gongster. Having spent a year teaching English at the University of Ljubljana in Yugoslavia, he attended graduate school at Columbia University and later obtained his doctorate in Slavic Studies.

== Career ==
=== Translations ===
While in graduate school, Scammell taught Russian Literature at Hunter College and began translating books from Russian. His first translation was a novel, Cities and Years, by the Soviet author, Konstantin Fedin. Having been introduced to Vladimir Nabokov, he translated two of Nabokov's Russian novels into English, The Gift and The Defense, followed by a translation of Crime and Punishment by Fyodor Dostoyevsky.

After moving back to England in 1965, Scammell translated Childhood, Boyhood and Youth by Lev Tolstoy and a detective novel, Petrovka 38, by the Soviet author, Yulian Semyonov. Two years later he joined the External Services division of the BBC as a Language Supervisor for East European Languages, and after becoming interested in the plight of Russian dissidents, translated a memoir about the post-Stalin gulag, My Testimony, by a former prisoner, Anatoly Marchenko. Together with the Slovenian poet, Veno Taufer, whom he met at the BBC, he also translated a selection of modern Slovenian poetry for a special issue of Modern Poetry in Translation. Many years later, he and Taufer translated a selection of poems by Slovenia's premier modern poet, Edvard Kocbek, under the title, "Nothing Is Lost".

=== Index on Censorship ===
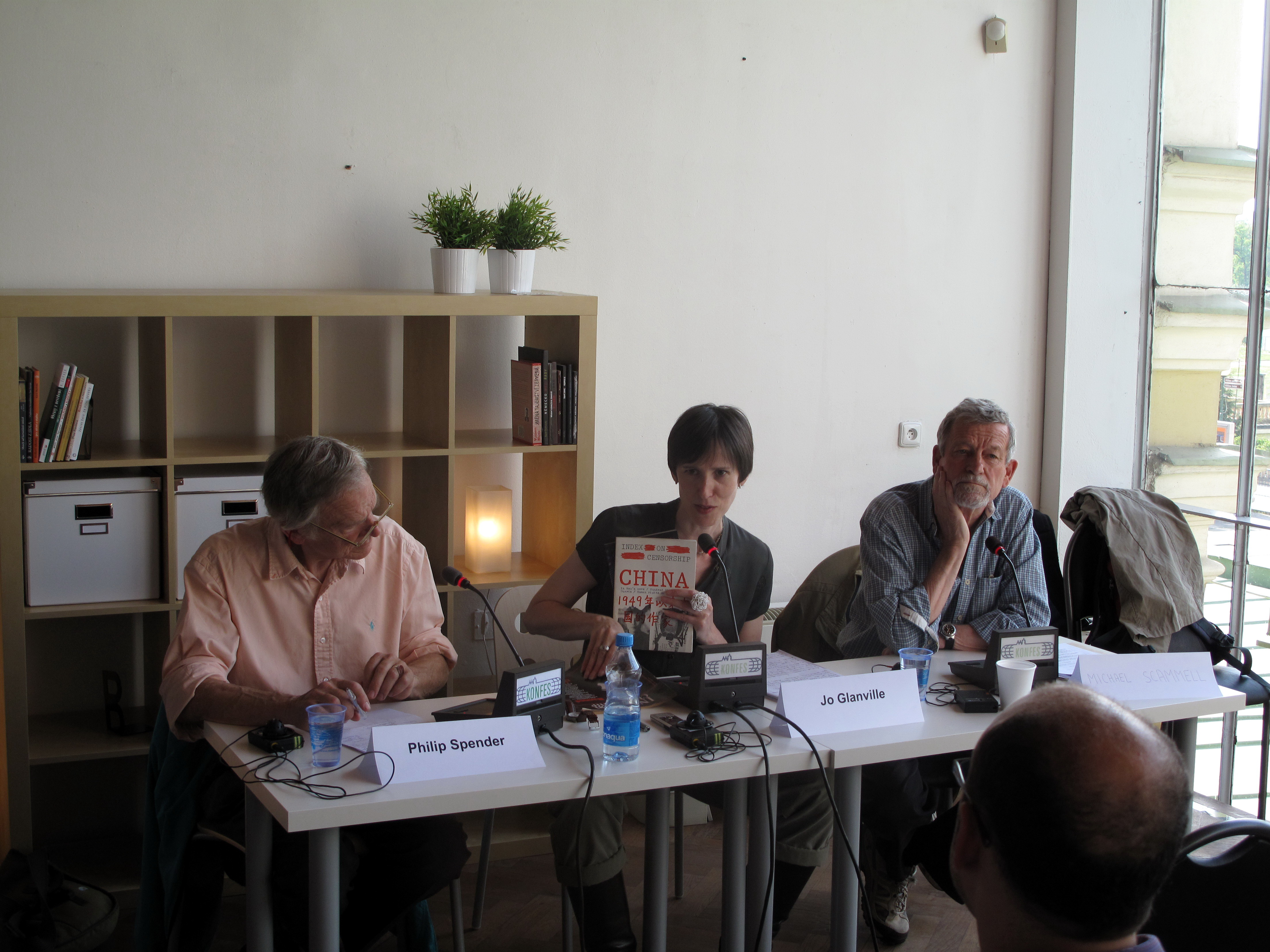
Philip Spender, Jo Glanville, Michael Scammell in Prague (2010)

In 1971, Scammell became the first director of the nonprofit Writers and Scholars International (later the Writers and Scholars Educational Trust) in London, and started the quarterly magazine, Index on Censorship, devoted to documenting censorship worldwide and promoting freedom of expression. In 1976 he was asked to revive the International PEN Club's moribund Writers in Prison Committee and remained chair for the next ten years.

For the next few years, he edited and partly translated an anthology of censored writing, Russia's Other Writers; edited an illustrated catalog, "Unofficial Art from the Soviet Union" to accompany an exhibition of paintings and sculpture he helped to organize under the same name; translated To Build a Castle by Vladimir Bukovsky; edited and supervised the translation of a set of cultural and political essays selected by Aleksandr Solzhenitsyn, From Under the Rubble; vetted the American translation of the first two volumes of The Gulag Archipelago by Solzhenitsyn; and arranged for the translation and publication of Solzhenitsyn's pamphlet, Letter to the Soviet Leaders, written shortly before the latter's expulsion from the Soviet Union.

=== Biographies ===
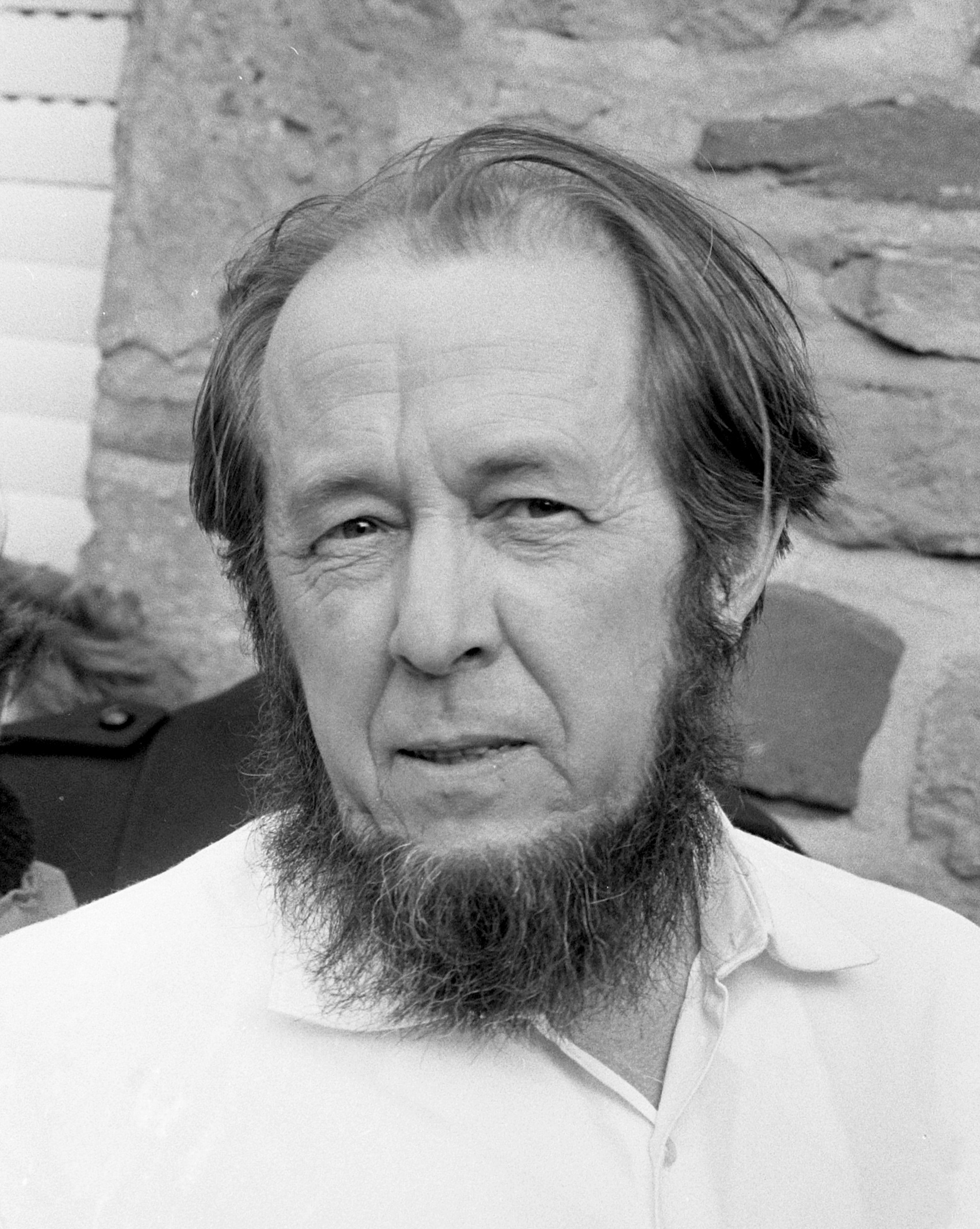
Aleksandr Solzhenitsyn (photographed in 1974) was the subject of Scammell's first biography

After meeting Solzhenitsyn in Zurich and Frankfurt, Scammell undertook to write Solzhenitsyn's biography (with the author's consent and cooperation, but without his authorization) and resigned from Index on Censorship to work on it full-time. Between 1981 and 1983 he lived in New York, chaired a seminar on censorship at New York University, ran an exchange program with Eastern Europe funded by George Soros, and attended weekly meetings of the New York Institute for the Humanities. Returning to England, he completed and published Solzhenitsyn, A Biography (1984).

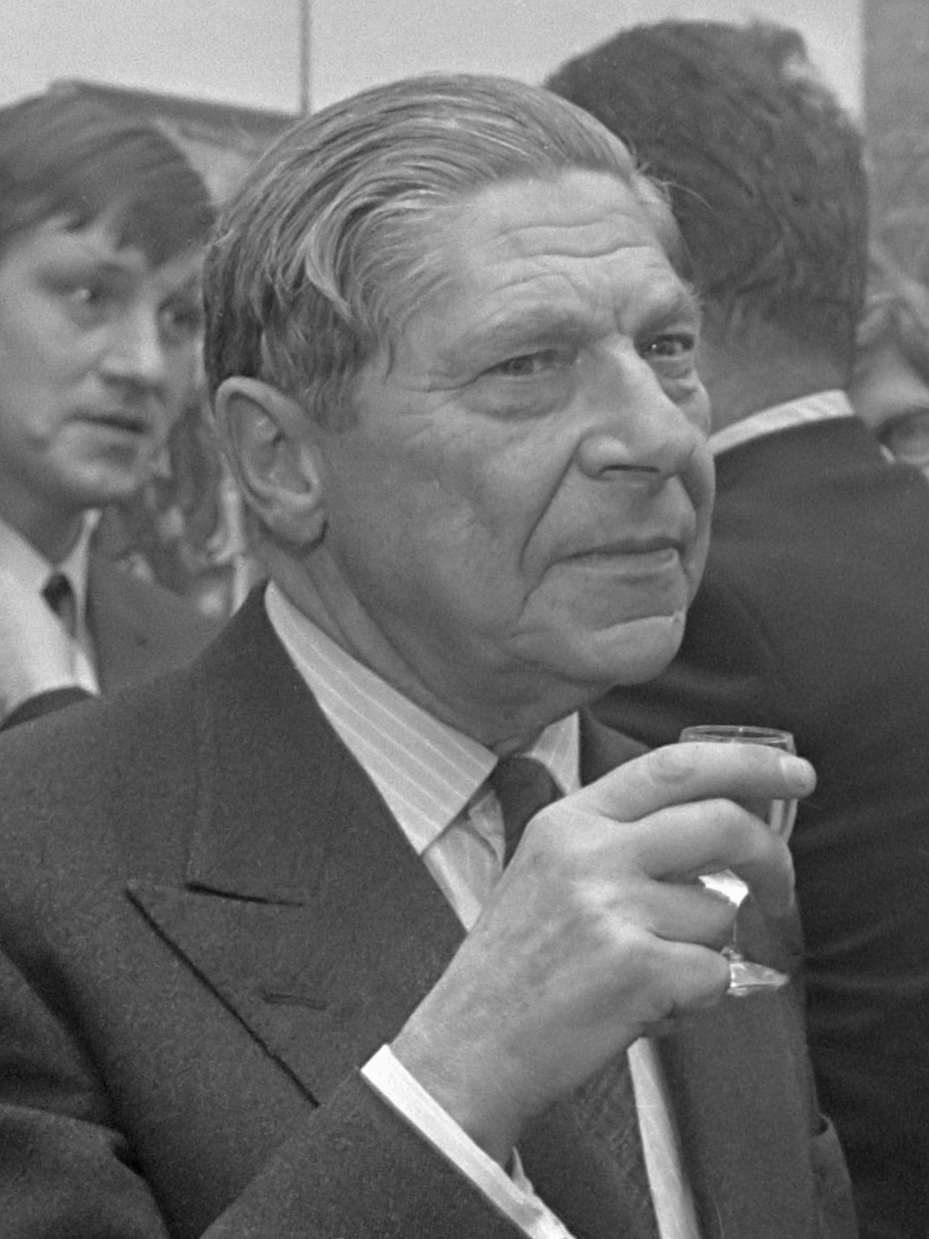
Arthur Koestler (photographed in 1969) is the subject of Scammell's second biography

Scammell was commissioned to write the authorized biography of Arthur Koestler, which after fifteen years of research and writing was published in the United States in 2009 as Koestler: The Literary and Political Odyssey of a Twentieth Century Skeptic, and in the UK in 2010 as Koestler: The Indispensable Intellectual. The book won the PEN/Jacqueline Bograd Weld Award for the best biography of 2009 in the United States and the Spears Magazine Award for best biography of 2010 in the UK. It was also shortlisted for the 2010 Los Angeles Times Book Prize for biography. The New York Times Book Review listed it as one of the "100 Best Books of 2010".

In 2016, Scammell reported the discovery by German doctoral candidate Matthias Weßel of the original German version of Koestler's Darkness at Noon. A Swiss university had archived it under the title "Koestler, Arthur. Rubaschow: Roman. Typoskript, März 1940, 326 pages." He deemed the discovery important because "Darkness at Noon is that rare specimen, a book known to the world only in translation." In 2018, he reported that Elsinor Verlag (publisher of the 1946 German translation) had published the German original, as Sonnenfinsternis (Solar Eclipse) in May 2018, with an introduction by Scammell and an afterword by Weßel. He also reported a new English translation to appear in 2019, with a different introduction and appendices. In August 2019, Scammell mentioned the new German original in The New York Times but made no reference to the forthcoming English translation or its publication date. An English translation based on the newfound text was published in September 2019. Scammell was its editor; Philip Boehm was its translator.

=== Academics ===
In 1985, Scammell returned to the United States to settle there permanently. From 1986 to 1994 he was a professor of Russian literature at Cornell University, and in 1994 moved to Columbia University to become Professor of Writing (Nonfiction) and Translation. He retired from Columbia at the end of 2011.

He is a member of the American Academy of Arts and Sciences, a vice president of International PEN. He has received fellowships from the Rockefeller Foundation Humanities Program, the Arts Council of Great Britain, the Ford Foundation, the Leverhulme Trust, the Jerusalem Foundation, the National Endowment for the Humanities, the Guggenheim Foundation, and the Historical Research Foundation.

== Personal life ==
Scammell is married to Rosemary Nossiff, a professor of Political Science at Marymount Manhattan College and previously a professor at Rutgers University.

He was previously married to Erika Roettges, with whom he has four children, Catherine, Stephen, Lesley and Ingrid.

== Works ==
Scammell has written for the Times Literary Supplement, The Observer, and The Guardian in the UK and has contributed articles and criticism to the New York Review of Books, The New York Times Book Review, The Los Angeles Times Book Review, Harper's, The New Republic, AGNI, and several other journals in the US.

His works in book form follow (listed by order of publication year).

=== Biographies ===
- Solzhenitsyn: A Biography. Norton. 1984. ISBN 0393018024.
- Koestler: The Literary and Political Odyssey of a Twentieth-Century Skeptic. New York: Random House. 2009. LCCN 2008051108.
- Koestler: The Indispensable Intellectual. London: Faber. 2010. The two books titled Koestler are the American and British editions of the same book.

=== Edited books ===
- Michael Scammell, ed. (1970). Russia's Other Writers, an Anthology of Samizdat. Longman. ISBN 0582127823. (Library of Congress)
- Michael Scammell, ed. (1971). Russia's Other Writers, an Anthology of Samizdat. Longman. ISBN 0582127823. LCCN 74083344.
- Jurij Mal'cev (1977). Michael Scammell (ed.). La Letteratura contemporanea nell'Europa dell'Est. Venezia: Marsilio. (Library of Congress)
- Alexander Solzhenitsyn; Mikhail Agursky; Vadim Borisov; Evgeny Barabanov; F. Korsakov; Igor Shafarevich (1975). Michael Scammell (ed.). From Under the Rubble. Translated by Michael Scammell and A. M. Brock (Translator) with introduction by Max Hayward. Little, Brown. ISBN 0316803723.
- Igor Golomshtok, Alexander Glezer (1977). Michael Scammell (ed.). Unofficial Art from the Soviet Union. Random House. ISBN 9780436477003.
- Michael Scammell, ed. (1977). La letteratura contemporanea nell'Europa dell'Este. La Biennale di Venezia/Marsilio Editori.
- Michael Scammell, ed. (1995). The Solzhenitsyn Files: Secret Soviet Documents Reveal One Man's Fight Against the Monolith. Catherine A. Fitzpatrick (trans.). Edition q. ISBN 9781883695064. (Library of Congress)

=== Translations ===
- Julian Semyonov (1965). Petrovka 38. Stein and Day.
- Anatoliĭ Marchenko (1969). My testimony. E. P. Dutton.
- Fyodor Dostoyevsky (1970). Crime and Punishment. New York: Washington Square Press.
- Vladimir Konstantinovich Bukovskiĭ (1979). To build a castle: my life as a dissenter. Viking Press. ISBN 978-0-670-71640-1.
- Vladimir Nabokov (1990) [1964]. The Defense. Vintage Books. ISBN 9780679727224. LCCN 89040546.
- Vladimir Nabokov (2000) [1964]. The Luzhin Defense. Penguin Books. ISBN 978-0-14-118598-9.
- Vladimir Nabokov (1963). The Gift. Putnam.(Vintage Books, 1991 ISBN 9780679727255)
- Konstantin Fedin (1993) [1962]. Cities and years. Dell Publishing. ISBN 9780810110663. LCCN 93013788.
- Leo Tolstoy (2002). Childhood, Boyhood and Youth. Random House, Inc. ISBN 978-0-375-75944-4. (Library of Congress)
- Edvard Kocbek (2004). Nothing is Lost. Princeton University Press. ISBN 978-0-691-11840-6. (Library of Congress)

== Awards ==
- Solzhenitsyn:
  - Los Angeles Times Award for Biography (1985)
  - Silver PEN award of the English PEN Centre for Nonfiction (1985)
- Koestler:
  - PEN/Jacqueline Bograd Weld Award for the best biography (2009)
  - Spears Magazine Award for best biography (2010)
