= Kenneth S. Lynn =

American author, historian, and professor (1923 – 2001)

Kenneth Schuyler Lynn (June 17, 1923 – June 24, 2001) was an American author, historian, and professor who was known for his biographical studies of famous people such as Mark Twain, Charlie Chaplin, Ernest Hemingway, Theodore Dreiser, William Dean Howells, and Harriet Beecher Stowe. Born in Cleveland, he graduated from Harvard College and later taught at Johns Hopkins University for 20 years.
