= Laura Walls =

American professor of English literature

Laura Dassow Walls (born Laura Dassow in Ketchikan, Alaska) is an American professor emerita of English at the University of Notre Dame.

== Areas of research ==
Walls has researched the intersections of literature and science in the works of Ralph Waldo Emerson, Henry David Thoreau, Alexander von Humboldt and related authors. She specializes in American Transcendentalism—especially Henry David Thoreau and Ralph Waldo Emerson, transatlantic romanticism, literature and science, and environmental literature and ecocriticism.

Books authored

- Walls, Laura Dassow (July 7, 2017). Henry David Thoreau: A Life. Chicago, Illinois: University of Chicago Press. ISBN 978-0-226-34469-0.
- Walls, Laura Dassow (September 30, 2009). The Passage to Cosmos: Alexander von Humboldt and the Shaping of America. Chicago, Illinois: University of Chicago Press. ISBN 978-0-226-87182-0.
- Walls, Laura Dassow (March 6, 2003). Emerson's Life in Science: The Culture of Truth. Ithaca, New York: Cornell University Press. ISBN 978-0-8014-4044-1.
- Walls, Laura Dassow (November 15, 1995). Seeing New Worlds: Henry David Thoreau and Nineteenth-Century Natural Science. Madison, Wisconsin: University of Wisconsin Press. ISBN 978-0-299-14744-0.

Books edited

- Myerson, Joel; Petrulionis, Sandra Harbert; Walls, Laura Dassow (April 16, 2010). The Oxford Handbook of Transcendentalism. Oxford, England: Oxford University Press. ISBN 978-0-19-533103-5.
- Petrulionis, Sandra Harbert; Walls, Laura Dassow (December 31, 2006). More Day to Dawn: Thoreau's Walden for the Twenty-first Century. Boston, Massachusetts: University of Massachusetts Press. ISBN 978-1-55849-576-0.
- Thoreau, Henry David; Walls, Laura Dassow; Huber, J. Parker (May 31, 1999). Material Faith: Thoreau on Science. Boston, Massachusetts: Mariner Books. ISBN 978-0-395-94800-2.

== Awards and degrees ==
Walls received the University of South Carolina’s Russell Research Award in spring 2010. She won the Merle Curti Award for best book in American intellectual history by the Organization of American Historians in April 2010. She received a Guggenheim Fellowship in May 2010. In October 2010, she won the Michelle Kendrick Memorial Book Award for the best book in literature and science by the Society for Literature, Science and the Arts. Walls received the Modern Language Association’s James Russell Lowell Prize for her book, The Passage to Cosmos: Alexander von Humboldt and the Shaping of America, on January 7, 2011, at the MLA’s annual convention. She has been awarded the 2012 Ralph Waldo Emerson Society Distinguished Achievement Award.

She studied at University of Washington earning a B.A. for English/Creative Writing in 1976 and an M.A. for English in 1978. She earned a Ph.D. from Indiana University in American Literature in 1992. Before going to University of South Carolina, she taught at Indiana University and Lafayette College.

Professor Walls joined the Notre Dame faculty in fall 2011 as the William P. and Hazel B. White Professor of English. She succeeds Gerald Bruns, who retired from Notre Dame in 2008 and inaugurated the William P. and Hazel B. White Professor of English chair.
