= Susan Kamil =

American book publisher (1949–2019)

- Born: Susan Laurie Kamil; September 16, 1949; New York City, U.S.
- Died: September 8, 2019 (aged 69); New York City, U.S.
- Education: Vassar College; George Washington University
- Occupations: Book editor and publisher
- Employer(s): Simon & Schuster (1979–1987); Random House (1987–2019)
- Spouse: Bob Kohn (m. 2011)

Susan Laurie Kamil (September 16, 1949 – September 8, 2019) was the publisher (as of 2018) as well as editor-in-chief of the Random House Publishing Group.

== Career ==
Susan Kamil was born in Manhattan, where she attended the High School of Music & Art. After graduating from George Washington University, she began her publishing career at Simon & Schuster in 1979. Kamil was a subsidiary rights director and then became a senior editor at Simon & Schuster working under Joni Evans. Evans was married to Dick Snyder, then CEO of Simon & Schuster. When Evans divorced Snyder in 1987 in a very public divorce, Evans moved over to Random House as Publisher, taking Kamil with her. Kamil said that Dick Snyder, CEO of Simon & Schuster "taught me everything--not just business lessons, life lessons--and I'll always be grateful to him."

At Random House, Kamil was executive editor at "Little Random" under Joni Evans. Both women later formed the imprint Turtle Bay books at "Big" Random House in 1991. Early titles from Turtle Bay focused on celebrity memoirs that had ultimately disappointing sales including Michael Caine's, What's It About?, Joan Rivers's Still Talking, and Brandon Tartikoff's The Last Great Ride. An exposé in New York magazine said that the fate of Turtle Bay Books was sealed by the infamous "Hair Piece." The New York Times ran a photo in the Business section featuring "a huge photograph of Evans and her glamorous gang of four looked like a fashion shoot." The title of the article was Random House's Glitzy New Imprint and Susan Kamil was in the photo. In the article, Joni Evans was quoted as saying, "What we normally talk about at these meetings is our hair." New York Magazine went on to report that "Jimmy Breslin told a friend of Evans's that she had the best-looking 'house' he'd ever seen. The Post's 'Page 6' christened the venture the Brownstone o' Babes. 'They looked like Charlie's Angels,' says one editor. 'Suddenly the whole thing seemed like a joke, and I don't know if they ever overcame it.'" Kamil and other women in the photo certainly did overcome it—Kamil becoming CEO of Random House, Julie Grau founding the imprint Spiegel and Grau, and Karen Rinaldi as Senior Vice-President at Harper Wave.

The Turtle Bay imprint was shuttered in 1993 after only two years and Kamil moved over to Bantam Doubleday Dell. It was there that she revived Dial Press as an imprint. The original Dial Press had been closed in 1985.

In 2008 she was named the editorial director for Dial Press and the editor-in-chief for the Random House Publishing Group or "Little Random." Kamil was promoted to Publisher for both Dial and Random House Publishing Group in 2010.

Kamil edited many notable books and authors including The Guernsey Literary and Potato Peel Society by Mary Ann Shaffer and Annie Barrows, The Imperfectionists by Tom Rachman, Major Pettigrew's Last Stand by Helen Simonson, and Sophie Kinsella's Shopaholic series. Other notable authors she worked with include Allegra Goodman, Elizabeth McCracken and Franz Lidz, whose childhood memoir Unstrung Heroes was the first book she purchased at Simon & Schuster. She died from complications of lung cancer in Manhattan on September 8, 2019, aged 69.
