= PureWow =

American women's lifestyle website

- Company type: Private
- Industry: Media
- Founded: 2010
- Headquarters: New York, New York
- Parent: Gallery Media Group
- Website: www.purewow.com

PureWow is an American digital media company that publishes women's lifestyle content. Acquired by Gary Vaynerchuk in 2017 as part of Gallery Media Group, PureWow tailors lifestyle topics for Millennials and Generation X, including fashion, beauty, home decor, recipes, entertainment, travel, technology, literature, wellness and money.

== History ==
PureWow was founded by Ryan Harwood in September 2010, along with Bob Pittman's Pilot Group and the women of wowOwow Joni Evans, Mary Wells Lawrence, Whoopi Goldberg, Liz Smith, Candice Bergen, and Lesley Stahl, among others. In January 2013, PureWow hired former Real Simple editor Mary Kate McGrath as its first editor-in-chief. In August 2014, PureWow was listed as no. 352 on Inc. Magazine's 2014 list of the top 500 fastest-growing privately owned companies. In May 2015, PureWow raised $2.5 million.

In 2017, serial entrepreneur Gary Vaynerchuk and Miami Dolphins' owner Stephen Ross' venture firm, RSE Ventures, acquired PureWow to form Gallery Media Group as a creative agency and media firm. PureWow's CEO, Ryan Harwood serves as the chief executive of Gallery Media Group.

== Editions ==
PureWow publishes national content as well as local content for New York City, Los Angeles, Chicago, San Francisco, Dallas, and the Hamptons. The company publishes content across fashion, beauty, homecare topics, technology, entertainment, books, wellness and finances. PureWow articles are distributed via its website PureWow.com, email, and over social media channels.
