= Lindbergh (book) =

1998 biography of Charles Lindbergh by A. Scott Berg

- Author: A. Scott Berg
- Language: English
- Subject: Biography
- Genre: Non-fiction
- Publisher: Putnam Publishing Group
- Publication date: September 21, 1998
- Publication place: United States
- Media type: Hardcover
- Pages: 640
- ISBN: 978-0399144493
- Preceded by: Goldwyn: A Biography
- Followed by: Kate Remembered

Lindbergh is a 1998 biography of Charles Lindbergh by A. Scott Berg. The book became a New York Times Best Seller and received the Pulitzer Prize and the Los Angeles Times Book Prize for biography.

== Background ==
"I felt it was one of the great untold stories of the 20th century..." - A. Scott Berg

Once he had completed his second book, Goldwyn: A Biography (about film producer Samuel Goldwyn, Jr.) in 1989, Berg began the search for his next subject. He wanted it to be "another great American cultural figure but—because I had written about Perkins (Note: Berg's first book was Max Perkins: Editor of Genius, a biography of editor Maxwell Perkins.) and Goldwyn—not somebody from the worlds of publishing or film". After briefly considering Tennessee Williams, Berg chose the aviator Charles Lindbergh, attracted by what he described as "the dramatic possibilities of the story of the great hero who became a great victim and a great villain". "Charles Lindbergh is a window onto the whole world -- a great lens for observing the American century," Berg elaborated.

When asked about previous biographies of Lindbergh, Berg noted "The problem is most of what has been written about him is wrong or misleading."

Berg had been interested earlier by the idea of writing a book on the life of Lindbergh but "had scratched Lindbergh off my list" when he heard that Lindbergh's papers were locked up and inaccessible. A few years later he was approached by Phyllis E. Grann, who ran Putnam at the time, about a biography of Lindbergh. Berg told her "I'd love to write it, but it can't be done. The papers are locked up. Mrs. Lindbergh is locked up. The children are locked up." Grann suggested he pursue the subject anyway, although she told him "You will never get to Mrs. Lindbergh." Berg took this as a challenge and spent the next nine months trying to get in touch with her. Berg's friend Katharine Hepburn offered to write Mrs. Lindbergh a letter, even though the two women did not know each other. Not long after, Berg heard from Mrs. Lindbergh.

Berg convinced Lindbergh's widow, Anne Morrow Lindbergh, who considered him "trustworthy," to grant him unprecedented access to the man's archives, which he was surprised to find totaled "1,300 boxes, or several million papers". In addition to his research in the archives, Berg also spoke with Mrs. Lindbergh, their five children and Lindbergh family friends. "You can't write about Charles without writing about me," the widow told Berg, allowing him access to her memoirs and diaries.

"The good news is that Lindbergh saved everything; the bad news is that Lindbergh saved everything." - A. Scott Berg

Berg found Lindbergh's papers "in a miraculous order." Lindbergh retained copies of all his correspondence, including carbon copies of all letters and notes he wrote. Amongst the archives Berg found the tie Lindbergh wore on his famous flight. Lindbergh annotated books that had been written about him, leaving abundant notes for future biographers. Berg found detailed lists of "errors and corrections" to these books, some running up to 75 pages in length. These qualifications were sometimes "less than flattering to him, but they were always the truth. It was done with a cold, objective sense of himself," Berg told Vanity Fair. It took the author two years to go through the voluminous archives.

Berg officially started the process Spring of 1990, with Mrs. Lindbergh's authorization in place, although he had done basic research over the previous six months. Putnam, Berg's publisher, was rumored to have paid the author a seven-figure advance in 1990 to allow him to write the book. With the advance in hand, the author spent four years researching his subject and another four years writing.

When the author told his grandmother that he was writing a biography of Lindbergh, she said "What do you want to write about him for? He was quite awful about the Jews."

During an interview not long after the release of the book, Charlie Rose recalled asking Berg nine years earlier "What's next?" Berg asked him to "think about who is the one person that hasn't been written about in a way that there's a giant great biography." When Rose could not think of a subject, Berg said "Lindbergh," and Rose replied "Absolutely right; he is one person I want to know a lot more about."

=== Cover photo ===
The previously unpublished photo of Lindbergh, taken a matter of days before his transatlantic flight, was found at the publishing deadline amongst hundreds of photos from the Lindbergh archives. Of the approximately 90 photos in the book, Berg estimates at least 40 were never before published.

== Reception ==
The biography was highly anticipated; prior to its publication the book's film rights were bought, sight unseen, by Steven Spielberg, who planned to direct a movie of it. Published in 1998, Lindbergh sold about 250,000 copies in hardcover and won the Pulitzer Prize for Biography or Autobiography.

Berg was noted for his exhaustive research, as well as his sympathetic, but by no means uncritical, approach to Lindbergh, whose alleged anti-Semitism he addressed "in a straightforward, unblinking manner," although some criticized Berg's reluctance to deal more strongly with it. The author did bring to light the alteration of Lindbergh's "supposedly candid World War II era diaries," reporting that the diaries published in 1970 had anti-Semitic entries omitted. Berg writes: "The bulk of the omissions centered on one subject: the Jews." An example of the quotes omitted from the diaries but included in Lindbergh: "A few Jews add strength and character to a country, but too many create chaos and we are getting too many."

== Reviews ==
- Geoffrey Ward – "In Lindbergh, A. Scott Berg brings us about as close as I suspect we will ever get to the man himself."
- People – "A brilliant biography of a fabulous but flawed American hero."
- Benjamin Schwarz, Los Angeles Times Book Review – "In his authoritative chronicle, Berg has allowed the inconsistencies, nuances and tribulations of Lindbergh's life to speak for themselves without judgment or speculation. In doing so, he has given us the definitive account of a dramatic and disturbing American story."
- Kirkus Reviews – "With Berg’s free access to previously unavailable documentation, this is sure to be the definitive biography of Lindbergh."
- Doris Kearns Goodwin – "This is a magisterial work; one of the most penetrating and fascinating biographies I have ever read. It deserves the highest praise from scholars, critics and readers alike."
- Booklist – "Masterfully written and extensively researched, this beautifully balanced biography depicts one of the twentieth century’s most controversial, famous, and yet private of men."
