= Woodrow Wilson and race =

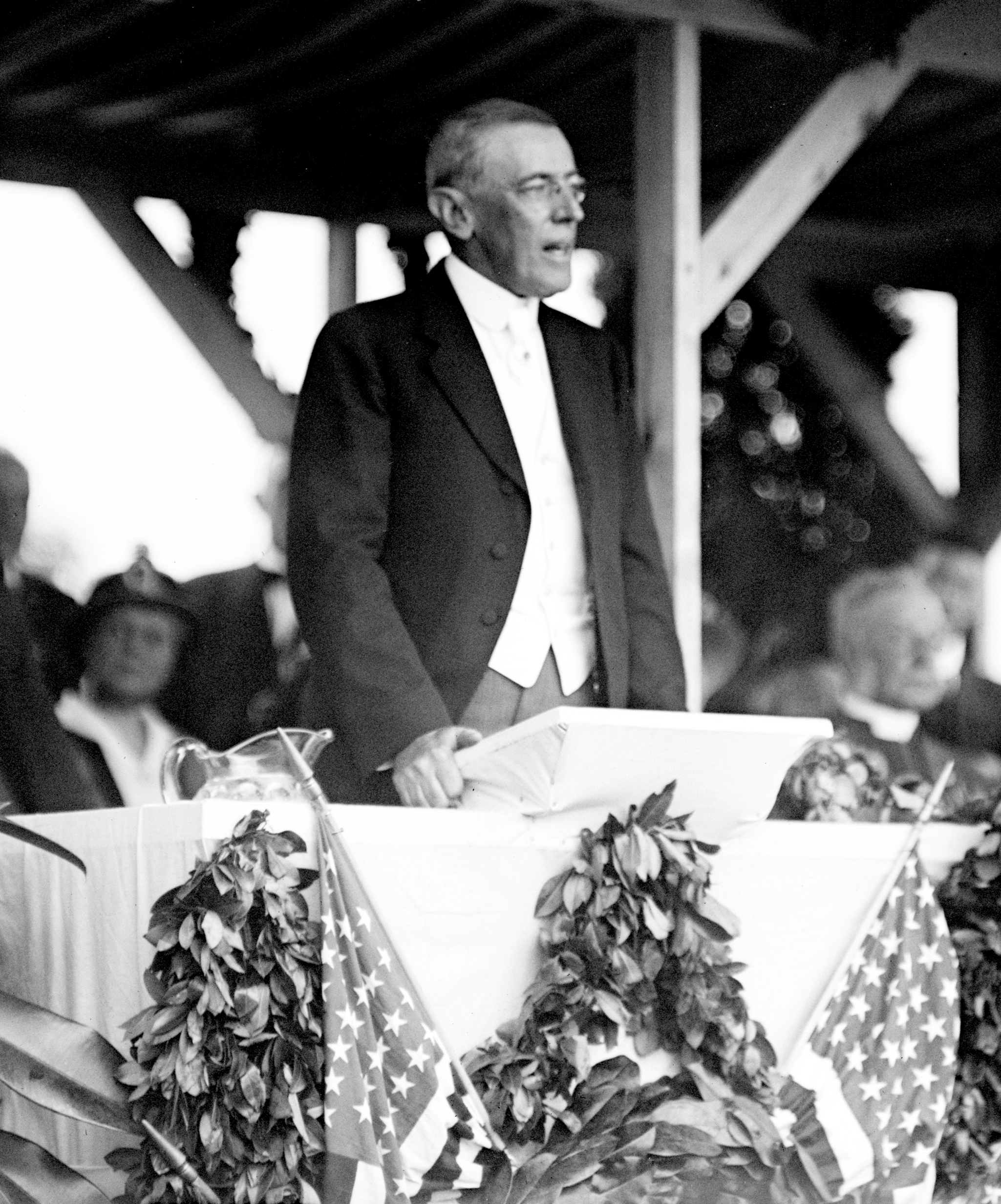
Wilson speaking at the dedication ceremony for the Confederate Memorial in Arlington National Cemetery, 1914

Woodrow Wilson was a prominent American scholar who served as president of Princeton University from 1902 to 1910, as governor of New Jersey from 1911 to 1913, and as the 28th president of the United States from 1913 to 1921. While Wilson's tenure is often noted for progressive achievement, his time in office was one of unprecedented regression in racial equality, with his presidency serving as the lowest point of the nadir of American race relations.

Several historians have spotlighted examples in the public record of Wilson's racist policies and political appointments, such as the segregationists in his Cabinet. Other sources note Wilson defended segregation on "scientific" grounds in private, and describe him as a man who "loved to tell racist 'darky' jokes about black Americans."

== Family and early life ==
Thomas Woodrow Wilson was born and raised in the American South by parents who supported the Confederacy. His father, Joseph Wilson, supported slavery and served as a chaplain with the Confederate States Army. Wilson's father was one of the founders of the Southern Presbyterian Church in the United States (PCUS) after it split from the Northern Presbyterians in 1861 over the issue of secession. Joseph became a minister of the First Presbyterian Church in Augusta, Georgia, and the family lived there until 1870.

While it is unclear whether the Wilsons ever owned slaves, the Presbyterian Church, as part of the compensation for his father's services as a pastor, provided slaves to attend to the Wilson family. According to Wilson, his earliest memory was of playing in his front yard as a three year old, hearing a passerby announce with disgust that Abraham Lincoln had been elected president, and that a war was coming.

== Wilson's views as an academic ==
Wilson was an apologist for slavery and the southern redemption movement; he was also one of the nation's foremost promoters of lost cause mythology. At Princeton, Wilson used his authority to actively discourage the admission of African Americans.

'The Birth of a Nation' used quotes from Wilson

Prior to entering politics, Wilson was one of the most highly regarded academics in America. Wilson's published works and area of scholarship focused on American history. Though this fact received less attention both during and after Wilson's academic career, much of his writings are overtly sympathetic towards slavery, the confederacy and redeemer movements. One of Wilson's books, History of the American People, includes such observations and was used as source material for The Birth of a Nation, a 1915 film that portrayed the Ku Klux Klan as a benevolent force. Quotes from Wilson's History of the American People used for the film include:

Adventurers swarmed out of the North, as much the enemies of one race as of the other, to cozen, beguile and use the negroes.... In the villages the negroes were the office holders, men who knew none of the uses of authority, except its insolences. [Ellipsis in the original.]

....The policy of the congressional leaders wrought...a veritable overthrow of civilization in the South.....in their determination to 'put the white South under the heel of the black South.' [Ellipses and underlining in the original.]

The white men were roused by a mere instinct of self-preservation.....until at last there had sprung into existence a great Ku Klux Klan, a veritable empire of the South, to protect the southern country. [Ellipsis in the original.]

However, Wilson had harsh words about the gap between the original goals of the KKK and what it had evolved into.

Congressional Government, another highly regarded civic publication of Wilson's, includes a strong condemnation of Reconstruction era policies. Wilson refers to the time period as being characterized by "Congressional despotism", a time when both states' rights and the system of checks and balances were disregarded. Wilson specifically criticized efforts to protect voting rights for African Americans and rulings by federal judges against state courts that refused to empanel black jurors. According to Wilson, congressional leaders had acted out of idealism, displaying "blatant disregard of the child-like state of the Negro and natural order of life", thus endangering American democracy as a whole.

In his lengthy works on American history, Wilson did not cover the institution of slavery in great detail. However, when he did discuss the issue, his views were apologetic towards the institution, at least as it existed in the rural south during the Antebellum period. Wilson described himself as an opponent of both slavery and the Confederacy, though based solely on the grounds that neither would in the long term prove beneficial for the southern economy. The idea that holding another human being in bondage as chattel was inherently immoral is absent from any of the Wilson's discussion on the subject: on the contrary, Wilson described slavery as a benevolent state for Negros, whose white masters looked after their "comfort and welfare" and "meted out justice fairly". According to Wilson, domestic slaves received "affection and indulgence" from their masters. Though Wilson admits some masters could be neglectful, he maintained that by and large slave owners acted "responsibly and dutifully" towards their inherently "indolent" field slaves, "who often did not earn their keep".

=== President of Princeton ===
In 1902, the board of trustees of Princeton University selected Wilson to be the school's next president. Wilson invited only one African American guest (out of an estimated 150) to attend his installation ceremony, Booker T. Washington. Though most accounts agree Wilson respected Washington, he would not allow him to be housed on campus with a member of the faculty; such arrangements had been made for all of the white guests coming from out of town to attend the ceremony. Wilson also refused to invite Washington to either of the two dinner parties hosted by him and his wife, Ellen, on the evening following the event.

Wilson appointed the first Jew and the first Catholic to the faculty and helped liberate the board from domination by conservative Presbyterians. Despite these reforms and being generally viewed as a success in his administrative role, Wilson used his position at Princeton to exclude African Americans from attendance. At the time, opportunities for higher education were limited for African Americans; though a handful of mostly elite, Northern schools did admit black students, few colleges and universities accepted black students prior to the twentieth century. Most African Americans able to receive higher education did so at HBCUs such as Howard University, but by the early 1900s, virtually all Ivy League schools had begun admitting small numbers of black students. In the years leading up to Wilson's tenure as president of Princeton, the school had taken "baby steps" towards integration, with a small but slowly increasing number of African Americans permitted to study at the graduate schools in varying capacities. Wilson did not immediately put an end to this practice, but he refused to allow it to extend or expand, and only one African American student received a degree during his tenure.

In 1903, Theodore Roosevelt appointed William Crum, an African American Republican, as a customs officer for the port of Charleston, South Carolina. Wilson, like many white Southerners, bitterly opposed Crum's appointment based on his race. During his remarks before a Princeton alumni group, Wilson made a vulgar joke, the punchline of which called Crum a "coon", saying that President Roosevelt "would put a 'coon' in it".

During the eight years that Wilson served as president of Princeton from 1902 to 1910, his perspective on race does not appear to have evolved; campus facilities remained segregated, and no African Americans were hired as faculty or admitted as undergraduate students during his tenure. In 1909, Wilson received a letter from a young African American man interested in applying to attend Princeton; Wilson had his assistant write back promptly that "it is altogether inadvisable for a colored man to enter Princeton". Wilson eventually came to include in his justification for refusing to admit African American students that Princeton had never done so in the past though he knew such claims to be false. By the end of his time as president at Princeton, Wilson had taken steps to erase from the public record that African Americans had ever attended or instructed at Princeton though neither was true. Princeton college did not admit a single black student until 1947, becoming the last Ivy League institution to racially integrate.

==== Modern re-assessment ====
In the 21st century, there have been growing calls to reappraise Wilson's legacy because of his views on race. During a debate over the removal of Confederate monuments in the wake of the Charleston church shooting, some people demanded the removal of Wilson's name from institutions affiliated with Princeton due to his administration's segregation of government offices. On June 26, 2020, Princeton University removed Wilson's name from its public policy school due to his "racist thinking and policies". The Princeton University Board of Trustees voted to remove Wilson's name from the university's School of Public and International Affairs, changing the name to the Princeton School of Public and International Affairs. The board also accelerated the retirement of the name of a soon-to-be-closed residential college, changing the name from Wilson College to First College. However, the board did not change the name of the university's highest honor for an undergraduate alumnus or alumna, the Woodrow Wilson Award, because it was the result of a gift. The board stated that when the university accepted that gift, it took on a legal obligation to name the prize for Wilson. Also in 2020 the Woodrow Wilson National Fellowship Foundation renamed to The Institute for Citizens & Scholars.

== 1912 presidential election ==
Following a brief but highly praised stint as the Governor of New Jersey from 1910 to 1912, Wilson became the surprise Democratic nominee for president in 1912. The 1912 presidential election was unique; the Republican incumbent, William Howard Taft, narrowly secured his party's nomination after being challenged for it by former president Theodore Roosevelt. After this, Roosevelt decided he would run anyway and with his supporters formed the Progressive Party. In the fifty years prior, Democrats had won the presidency only twice; the split in the Republican Party made Wilson's candidacy far more viable than originally assumed.

After decades of loyal support, by 1912, many African Americans had grown disillusioned with the Republican Party and its record of failure on civil rights. This view was particularly true with regards to Taft, whose campaign barely acknowledged the black community, in part to avoid alienating southern whites, whom Taft mistakenly believed could finally be won over by a Republican candidate. At first, many prominent African Americans, including Booker T. Washington, lent their support instead to the Progressive Party candidate, Teddy Roosevelt. Roosevelt's own record towards the black community while in office was suspect, however. Roosevelt's standing with the black community, already vulnerable, was irreparably harmed after the Progressive Party excluded southern black delegates from participating at their 1912 convention.

Though African Americans had increasingly been drawn into the ranks of Democratic Party supporters in regions where the party's Liberal wing was very strong, Wilson's candidacy was initially broadly dismissed out of hand. However, during the 1912 campaign, Wilson, to the surprise of many, appeared highly responsive to the concerns of the black community. In his correspondences with representatives of the black community, Wilson promised to answer their grievances if elected and made a point of promising to be "the President of all Americans". Wilson never expressly renounced his prior views on segregation and race relations, but many took his words and actions – such as receiving black leaders at his home on multiple occasions – as showing that he was a changed man.

Wilson's most active and prominent supporter from the black community in 1912 was scholar and activist W. E. B. Du Bois, who campaigned enthusiastically on Wilson's behalf. Du Bois endorsed Wilson as a "liberal Southerner", who would deal fairly with Negros and whose economic plan would benefit all Americans. A seasoned political voice within the African American community, Du Bois was a co-founder of the National Association for the Advancement of Colored People (NAACP), in addition to being the editor and chief of the organization's newspaper, The Crisis, which he used to attract Negro support to Wilson. By election day, Wilson had won over the support of many of the black community's most prominent and militant leaders, including William Monroe Trotter and Reverend John Milton Waldron, as well as leader of the National Colored Democratic League and African Methodist Episcopal Zion Church bishop, Alexander Walters.

=== Post-election ===
The 1912 presidential election was a bitter and contentious contest. Wilson ultimately won, but with only around 42% of voters casting their ballot for him, the lowest proportion of the popular vote by a successful candidate since Abraham Lincoln in the 1860 election. 1912 is the most recent occasion in which four candidates for president all won more than 5% of the popular vote and the only instance in modern history where three candidates received more than 20%. Wilson was the first Democrat to win the presidency since 1892, but received fewer votes overall than the Democratic candidate in three of the previous four races.

Arguably the most unique aspect of all is that in 1912, Woodrow Wilson performed significantly better with Black voters than previous Democrats. Though few African Americans were able to vote at the time, it is possible, albeit highly unlikely, (Note: According to researchers such as Kathleen Wolgemuth, though much can be ascertained using contemporary secondary sources, complex statistical records of exact nationwide results have been lost.) that black votes secured Wilson's victory. Du Bois certainly believed as much to be the case, saying so in a letter he wrote to Wilson after he won the election, and stating that all he and his people desired in return for the overwhelming support they gave him was to safeguard their basic civil and human rights.

One of only two Democrats elected to the presidency between 1860 and 1932, and the first southerner to be elected president since Zachary Taylor in 1848, Woodrow Wilson was the only former subject of the Confederacy to ever serve as President. Wilson's election was celebrated by southern segregationists.

Despite this fact, the African American community generally appeared to be optimistic following Wilson's victory. Du Bois wrote that the black community could finally expect to be dealt with "fairly" because Wilson would not advance Jim Crow, nor would he dismiss black employees and appointees of the federal government based on their race. According to Du Bois, the incoming President Wilson was a man whose "personality gives us hope" and believes that blacks have a right to be "heard and considered" in the United States. William Trotter said that to the black community, the incoming President Wilson was seen as a "second coming of Abraham Lincoln". Trotter, Du Bois and the many other African Americans who risked their reputations on Wilson's behalf would soon be bitterly disappointed.

== Cabinet dominated by Southerners ==
Although elected to the presidency as the sitting governor of a northern state, Wilson showed himself to be very much a southern president in line with his upbringing. Wilson's first cabinet was predominantly composed of white Southerners, including those who, like the new president himself, were raised in the South before moving later in life. At the time, the South, which contained the only eleven states where Wilson won an outright majority of the vote in the 1912 presidential election, was politically dominated by the Democratic Party. In effect, Wilson's cabinet and administration was dominated by racists. A range of ideations was still present: Postmaster General Albert S. Burleson was devoted to institutionalized segregation; James Clark McReynolds, Wilson's first Attorney General, was a notorious personal though not so much political bigot; Secretary of the Navy Josephus Daniels was a violent white supremacist, counted among the leaders behind the Wilmington massacre. Their effects would be felt throughout Wilson's presidency.

=== Exclusion of African Americans from administration appointments ===
By the 1910s, African Americans had become effectively shut out of elected office. Obtaining an executive appointment to a position within the federal bureaucracy was usually the only option for African American statesmen. As Wilson named white supremacists to the highest levels of his administration, African Americans were appointed in record low numbers. While it has been claimed Wilson continued to appoint African Americans to positions that had traditionally been filled by blacks, overcoming opposition from many southern senators, such claims deflect most of the truth. Since the end of Reconstruction, both parties recognized certain appointments as unofficially reserved for qualified African Americans. Wilson appointed a total of nine African Americans to prominent positions in the federal bureaucracy, eight of whom were Republican carry-overs. For comparison, Taft was met with disdain and outrage from Republicans of both races for appointing "a mere thirty-one black officeholders", a record low for a Republican president. Upon taking office, Wilson fired all but two of the seventeen black supervisors in the federal bureaucracy appointed by Taft. Wilson flatly refused to even consider African Americans for appointments in the South. Since 1863, the U.S. mission to Haiti was almost always led by an African American diplomat, regardless of what party the sitting President belonged to; Wilson ended this half-century old tradition, though he did continue appointing black diplomats to head the mission to Liberia.

Though Wilson's administration dramatically escalated discriminatory hiring policies and the extent of segregation in federal government offices, both of these practices pre-dated his administration and for the first time since Reconstruction, they arguably reached notable levels under President Theodore Roosevelt; a regression that continued under President William Howard Taft. While this trend has been pointed to by supporters of Woodrow Wilson such as A. Scott Berg, the discrepancy between these three administrations is extreme. For example, African American federal clerks who were earning top pay were twelve times more likely to be promoted (48) than demoted (4) over the course of the Taft administration; in contrast, the same class of black workers was twice as likely to be demoted or fired (22) than promoted (11) during Wilson's first term in office. Furthermore, prominent African American activists including W. E. B. Du Bois described the federal bureaucracy as being effectively devoid of significant racist discrimination prior to Wilson; other contemporary sources record no noticeable instances of segregation within the federal civil service prior to Wilson.

=== Segregating the federal bureaucracy ===
Since the end of Reconstruction, the federal bureaucracy had been possibly the only career path where African Americans "witnessed some level of equity" and it was also the life blood and foundation of the black middle class.

Not only were African Americans almost completely excluded from higher level appointments, the Wilson cabinet was dominated by southerners, many of whom were unapologetic white supremacists. In Wilson's first month in office, Postmaster General Albert S. Burleson, a former Democratic congressman from Texas, urged the president to establish segregated government offices. Wilson did not adopt Burleson's proposal, but he did resolve to give his Cabinet Secretaries discretion to segregate their respective departments. By the end of 1913, many departments, including the Navy, Treasury, Commerce, and the Post Office, had segregated work spaces, restrooms, and cafeterias. Many agencies used segregation as a pretext to adopt whites-only employment policies on the basis that they lacked facilities for black employees; in these instances, African Americans employed prior to the Wilson administration were either offered early retirement, transferred or fired. Since the overwhelming majority of black civilian employees of the federal government worked for either the Treasury, Department of Commerce (mainly for the statistics bureau) or the Postal Service, these measures had a devastating impact on the previously prosperous community of African American federal civil servants.

Discrimination in the federal hiring process increased even further after 1914, when the Civil Service Commission instituted a new policy, requiring job applicants to submit a photo with their application. The Civil Service Commission claimed that the photograph requirement was implemented in order to prevent instances of applicant fraud, even though only 14 cases of impersonation or attempted impersonation in the application process had been uncovered by the commission the previous year.

As a federal enclave, Washington D.C. had long offered African Americans greater opportunities for employment and subjected them to less glaring discrimination. In 1919, black soldiers who returned to the city after they had completed their service in World War I, were outraged to find out that Jim Crow was now in effect; they could not return to the jobs which they had held prior to the war, with many of them noting that they could not even enter the same buildings which they used to work in. Booker T. Washington, who visited the capital to investigate claims that African Americans had been virtually shut out of the city's bureaucracy, described the situation: "(I) had never seen the colored people so discouraged and bitter as they are at the present time."

A 2021 study in The Quarterly Journal of Economics found that Wilson's segregation of the civil service increased the black–white earnings gap by 3.4–6.9 percentage points, as existing black civil servants were driven to lower-paid positions. Black civil servants who were exposed to Wilson's segregationist policies experienced a relative decline in home ownership rates, with suggestive evidence of lasting adverse effects for the descendants of those black civil servants.

=== Reaction of prominent African Americans ===
In 1912, despite his southern roots and record at Princeton, Wilson became the first Democrat to receive widespread support from the African American community in a presidential election. Wilson's African-American supporters, many of whom had crossed party lines to vote for him in 1912, were bitterly disappointed and protested these changes.

For a time, Wilson's most prominent supporter in the black community was scholar and activist, W. E. B. Du Bois. In 1912, Du Bois came to campaign enthusiastically on Wilson's behalf, endorsing him as a "liberal Southerner". Du Bois, a seasoned political voice in the African American community, had previously been a Republican, but like many black Americans by 1912, felt the Republican Party had deserted them, especially during the Taft administration. Like most African-Americans, Du Bois originally dismissed Wilson's candidacy out of hand. After briefly supporting Theodore Roosevelt, (before coming to see his Bull Moose Party as unwilling to confront civil rights) he resolved instead to support Socialist Party candidate Eugene V. Debs. However, during the 1912 campaign, Wilson, to the surprise of many appeared highly responsive to the concerns of the black community, and promised to answer their grievances if elected. Du Bois remarked that no candidate in recent memory had openly expressed such sentiments and rallied African Americans support for Wilson. After the election, it was hoped by many Wilson would support progressive civil rights reform, including passage of the long sought after Anti-Lynching Bill. Some expected only modest improvements and still others felt contented that at least Wilson would not regress on civil rights. Following the election Du Bois wrote to Wilson that all he and his people desired in return for the overwhelming support they gave him on Election Day, was safeguard their basic civil and human rights.

These hopes were almost immediately dashed, however. Less than six months into his first term, Du Bois wrote to Wilson again, decrying the damage he had already done to the black community; commenting that the administration had given aid and comfort to every hateful enemy the Negro community knew. Du Bois implored Wilson to change course.

Wilson in turn defended his administration's segregation policy in a July 1913 letter responding to civil rights activist Oswald Garrison Villard, arguing that segregation removed "friction" between the races. Du Bois, who, out of support for Wilson in 1912, had gone so far as to resign his leadership position in the Socialist Party, wrote a scathing editorial in 1914 attacking Wilson for allowing the widespread dismissal of federal workers for no offense other than their race and decrying his refusal to keep true to his campaign promises to the black community.

== African Americans in the armed forces ==
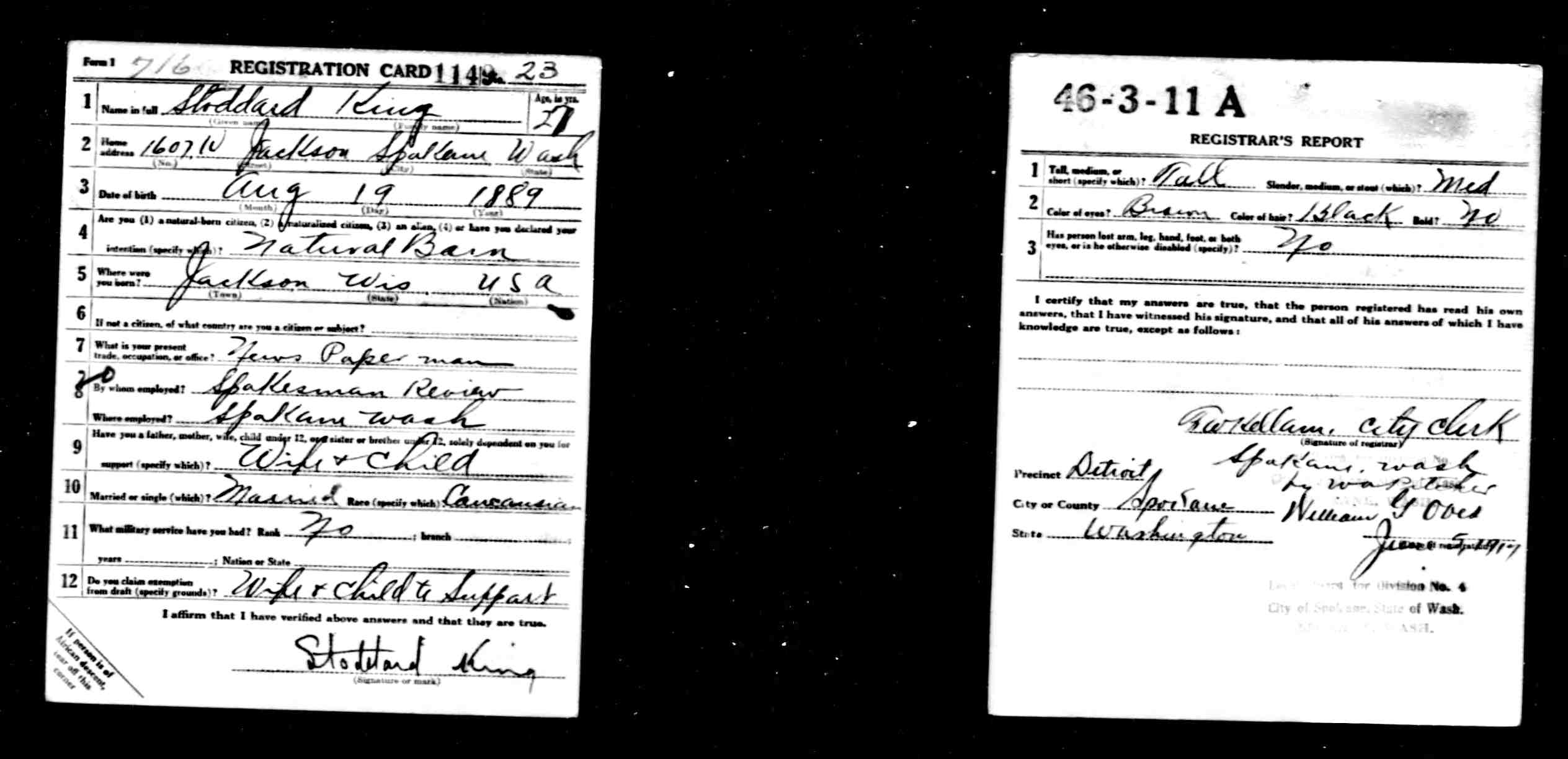
World War I draft card, the lower left corner to be removed by men of African background to help keep the military segregated

=== Army ===
While segregation had been present in the army prior to Wilson, its severity increased significantly following his election. During Wilson's first term, the army and navy refused to commission new black officers. Black officers already serving experienced increased discrimination and were often forced out or discharged on dubious grounds. Following the entry of the U.S. into World War I, the War Department drafted hundreds of thousands of blacks into the army, and draftees were paid equally regardless of race. Commissioning of African American officers resumed but units remained segregated and most all-black units were led by white officers.

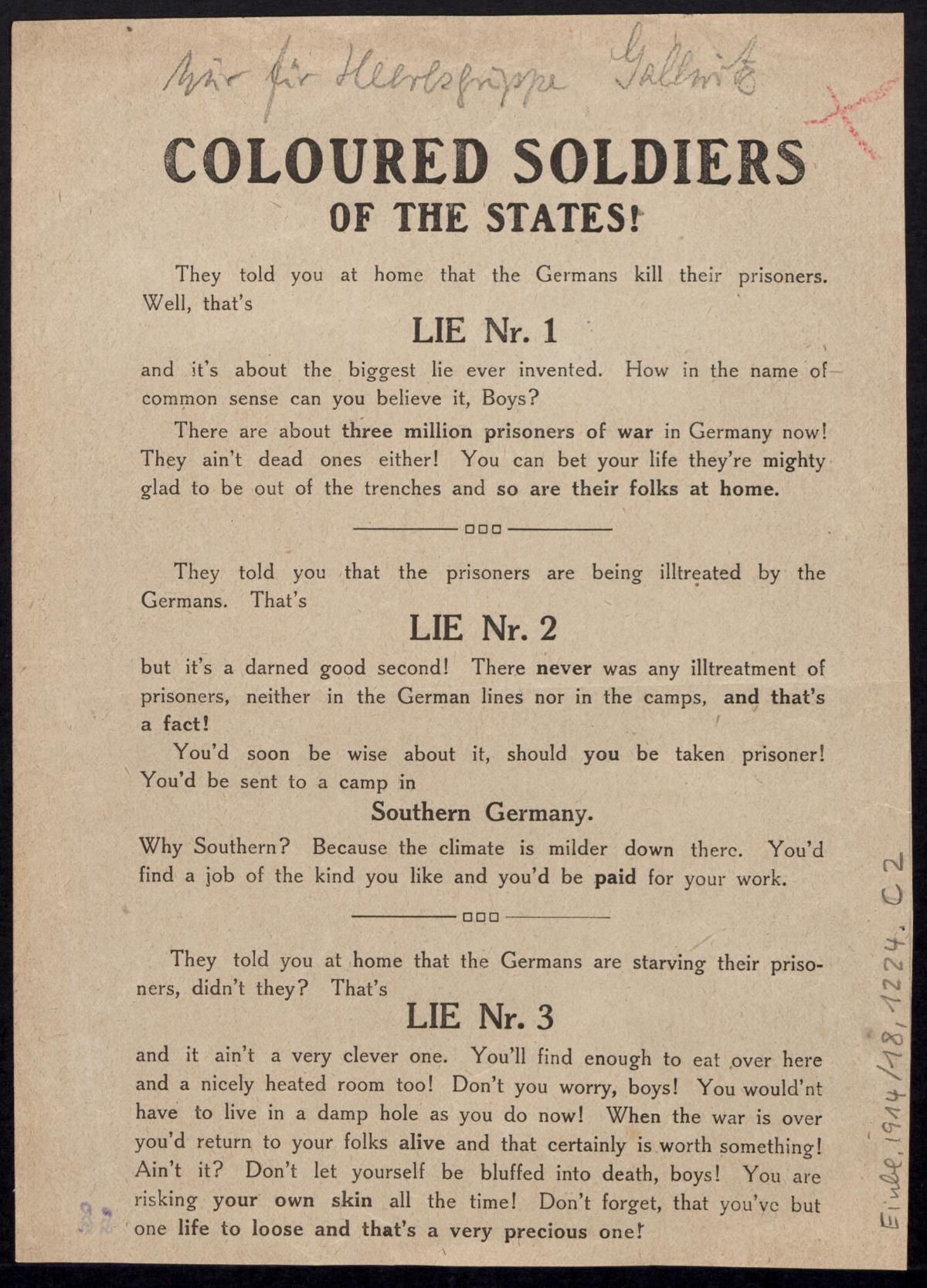
German propaganda targeting African American troops in World War I

During World War I, African American soldiers served with distinction in the trenches, despite attempts by white supremacists in Congress to bar them from serving in combat. An army General Staff report in 1918 stated, "The mass of the colored drafted men cannot be used for combatant troops", and recommended instead that "these colored drafted men be organized in reserve labor battalions". As a result, although Black soldiers were initially deployed to the front in the comparable numbers as white GIs, many were reassigned to duty away from the front with thousands working unskilled tasks such as stevedores in the Atlantic ports and common laborers at the camps and in the Services of the Rear in France. Ultimately, one fifth of the black soldiers sent to Europe fought in combat, compared to two-thirds of white soldiers. Blacks comprised 3% of AEF forces but less than 2% of battlefield fatalities.

AEF Commander General John Joseph Pershing was a staunch opponent of racial discrimination and took great care to uphold equality in the military. Despite his efforts, black units were consistently neglected. Kennedy reports "Units of the black 92nd Division particularly suffered from poor preparation and the breakdown in command control. As the only black combat division, the 92nd Division entered the line with unique liabilities. It had been deliberately dispersed throughout several camps during its stateside training; some of its artillery units were summoned to France before they had completed their courses of instruction, and were never fully equipped until after the Armistice; nearly all its senior white officers scorned the men under their command and repeatedly asked to be transferred. The black enlisted men were frequently diverted from their already attenuated training opportunities in France in the summer of 1918 and put to work as stevedores and common laborers." Germany published propaganda specifically tailored towards black troops, exploiting their denial of civil rights in the United States based on their race.

When the AEF first deployed, the Allied powers made repeated overtures for American units to be assigned to British or French command to serve as replacements in the lines. Pershing staunchly resisted these attempts, in large part due to apparent willingness of Allied commanders to sacrifice the lives of their own soldiers, resulting in tremendously high casualties. This was especially true of the French army, whose front-line troops were resisting combat duties to the point of mutiny. However, when the French requested control over several regiments of black combat troops, Wilson overruled Pershing and approved the request. While the black regiments placed under French control served with great distinction and were praised by the French government for their service, the decision to place them under French command resulted in these units suffering some of the highest casualties of American forces in World War I.

==== The Houston riot ====
After America's entry into World War I, the presence and even movement of black soldiers through the segregated south sparked racial tension that at times erupted into violence, the most notable such incident being the Houston riot of 1917. Following repeated incidents and violence by Houston police, black soldiers stationed adjacent to the city, possibly acting on unconfirmed rumors a white mob had formed with the purpose of lynching Negroes garrisoned on base, seized arms and munitions from the base armory and rioted across downtown Houston. The alleged white mob was unaccounted for, but many "whites only" businesses were set ablaze or vandalized. HPD were deployed but proved no match for the well armed soldiers. The rioters killed over a dozen whites, including five police officers and a white Army officer who tried to intervene. In the aftermath, the soldiers suspected of involvement were court-martialed in one of the largest military tribunals in American history; controversy exists to this day about the level of equity it provided. Of over 100 black soldiers convicted, 29 were given death sentences.

Wilson publicly condemned the participants and defended the investigation and courts-martial as models of justice and fairness. While refusing to consider policy changes that may have prevented the riot in the first place, he commuted the sentences of 10 of the condemned soldiers to life in prison. Wilson stated that he affirmed the death sentences of six soldiers because there was "plain evidence" that they "deliberately" engaged in "shocking brutality". On the other hand, he commuted the remaining sentences because he believed the "lesson" of the lawless riot had already been "adequately pointed". He desired the "splendid loyalty" of African American soldiers be recognized and expressed the hope that clemency would inspire them "to further zeal and service to the country".

=== Navy ===
Unlike the army, the U.S. Navy was never formally segregated. For over a century prior to Wilson taking office, black sailors had served effectively alongside white sailors; fighting with distinction in every major conflict that called the Navy to action since at least the War of 1812. Following Wilson's appointment of Josephus Daniels as Secretary of the Navy in 1913, a system of Jim Crow was swiftly implemented; with ships, training facilities, restrooms, and cafeterias all becoming segregated. Daniels was an ardent and at times violent white supremacist. While he significantly expanded opportunities for advancement and training available to white sailors, by the time the U.S. entered World War I, African American sailors had been relegated almost entirely to mess and custodial duties, and were often assigned to act as servants to white officers.

== Response to race riots and lynchings ==
The time period of Wilson's presidency (1913–1921), was the worst era of race-based violence in the United States since Reconstruction. In contrast to previous time periods, incidents were not largely confined to South. Between 1917 and 1921, hundreds of African Americans were murdered in race riots, most of which took place outside of the former Confederacy.

In response to the demand for industrial labor, the Great Migration of African Americans out of the South surged in 1917 and 1918. Some attribute this migration as sparking race riots, including the East St. Louis riots of 1917. In response, but only after much public outcry and pressure, Wilson asked Attorney General Thomas Watt Gregory if the federal government could intervene to "check these disgraceful outrages". However, on the advice of Gregory, Wilson did not take direct action against the riots. In 1918, Wilson spoke out against lynchings, stating, "I say plainly that every American who takes part in the action of mob or gives it any sort of continence is no true son of this great democracy but its betrayer, and ... [discredits] her by that single disloyalty to her standards of law and of rights", though he took no further action.

In 1919, another series of race riots occurred in Chicago; Omaha, Nebraska; Elaine, Arkansas; and two dozen other major cities across the North. Initially, the federal government once again refused to involve itself, despite appeals from both black and white statesmen. As the violence escalated however, the War Department intervened, deploying thousands of federal troops to areas experiencing unrest. Federal troops arrived after the worst of the violence had already occurred though they did take measures to restore order and prevent future outbreaks. No federal prosecutions were pursued against those who perpetrated the violence.

The extent, if any, that this second wave of violence and the failure of the federal government to adequately respond, can be attributed to the racial prejudices of Woodrow Wilson is unclear, but fairly weak. The underlying causes of the race riots of the late 1910s vary in specifics but are largely attributable to local labor and economic unrest, an area Wilson is usually considered to have been highly responsive towards. In all of these incidents, though the federal government failed to take corrective action, state and local authorities regularly exhibited clear malice towards the victimized black communities. Some point to the swift and decisive actions against the alleged perpetrators of the Houston riot in 1917 as evidence Wilson could and would respond, depending on the race of those involved. However, the details of the Houston case meant the federal government automatically assumed jurisdiction through the UCMJ and evidence Wilson interfered in the case does not exist. Several major race riots, including the Tulsa massacre, took place after Wilson left office and in spite of the Republican Harding administration's much firmer stance in support of the rights of African Americans. Wilson was incapacitated by a stroke he suffered in late 1919 and for most of the next year his staff and cabinet acted without direction from the president and avoided taking decisive action or changes to policy. Despite his record of inaction, it is arguably a stretch to hold Wilson accountable for the spike in racial violence during this time considering his mental state and the still limited role expected of the presidency when it came to matters of local unrest. Even Wilson's consistent critics such as Du Bois declined to blame him outright, or limited the scope of their criticisms.

== Blocking the racial equality proposal in the Versailles Treaty ==
Wilson sat as chairman during the Paris Peace Conference; as both chairman and leader of the American delegation, Wilson wielded great power over the negotiations. Many of Wilson's proposals to safeguard world peace and democracy in the post war era, such as the League of Nations, were proving more popular outside of the United States than within. It soon became clear that convincing the U.S. Senate to ratify the likely peace terms would be an uphill battle.

The situation became more divisive when the delegation for the Empire of Japan moved to include in the Charter of the League of Nations and the Treaty of Versailles a declaration of racial equality. Japan had fought on the side of the Allies and was the only non-white nation of the five major powers (the others being Britain, France, the United States and Italy). The first draft of the Racial Equality Amendment was presented to the Commission on February 13, 1919, and stated:

The equality of nations being a basic principle of the League of Nations, the High Contracting Parties agree to accord as soon as possible to all alien nationals of states, members of the League, equal and just treatment in every respect making no distinction, either in law or in fact, on account of their race or nationality.

Makino Nobuaki, of the Japanese delegation, argued that during the war, allied soldiers of different races came together and successfully fought side by side, creating "A common bond of sympathy and gratitude has been established to an extent never before experienced."

From its inception, the proposal proved to be immensely controversial; several newspapers in the United States immediately denounced it while Australian Prime Minister Billy Hughes (who opposed the proposal) announced at a meeting that "ninety-five out of one hundred Australians rejected the very idea of equality". The proposal was mostly symbolic in force, as the only change it required would be that signatories would have to treat each other's citizens equally, without regard to race. This did not mean countries could no longer ban or limit immigration from wherever they desired (though many took it to mean as much), but jurisdictions such as Australia, the United States and Canada would no longer be able to treat permanent residents as legally inferior based on Japanese ancestry. The British delegation, on behalf of Britain's dominions, voiced strong objections to the proposal, while the French, Italian and Greek delegations all expressed enthusiastic support. After protracted and heated debate, a final vote was called; from a quorum of 17, the Racial Equality Amendment secured 11 votes in favor, with no delegate from any nation voting no, though there were 6 abstentions, including all 4 from the British and American delegations. The proposal was unpopular with many White Americans (particularly those living in the West Coast), while the British were under heavy diplomatic pressure from Australia and South Africa, which maintained policies such as the White Australia policy but as dominions were unable to vote on the proposal.

Wilson exercised his power as chairman and ruled the matter required a unanimous vote and therefore had failed. Wilson explained that this specific amendment was so divisive and extreme it must have unanimous support in order to pass. According to Naoko Shimazu, "Wilson perceived a great risk to the future of the League, should the racial equality issue become unmanageable by creating divisions in the plenary session. He tried to calm Japanese nerves by reiterating the importance of equality of nations in the League of Nations. Essentially, what Wilson managed to do through unanimity voting was to place the onus of rejecting the proposal on Britain."

Wilson's actions soured relations between the United States and Japan, weakening Japanese civilian opposition to Japan's increasing levels of militarism and an aggressive foreign policy.

Though Wilson aggressively championed the cause of self-determination for many stateless peoples of Eastern Europe, his sympathy did not extend to the "backward countries" of Asia and Africa, as Wilson's chief advisor in Paris, Colonel House referred to them. However, unlike the other major powers present, Wilson did not attempt to acquire or accept offers for colonial acquisitions as war spoils for the United States, carved from the defeated territories formerly controlled by the Central Powers.

== White House screening of The Birth of a Nation ==
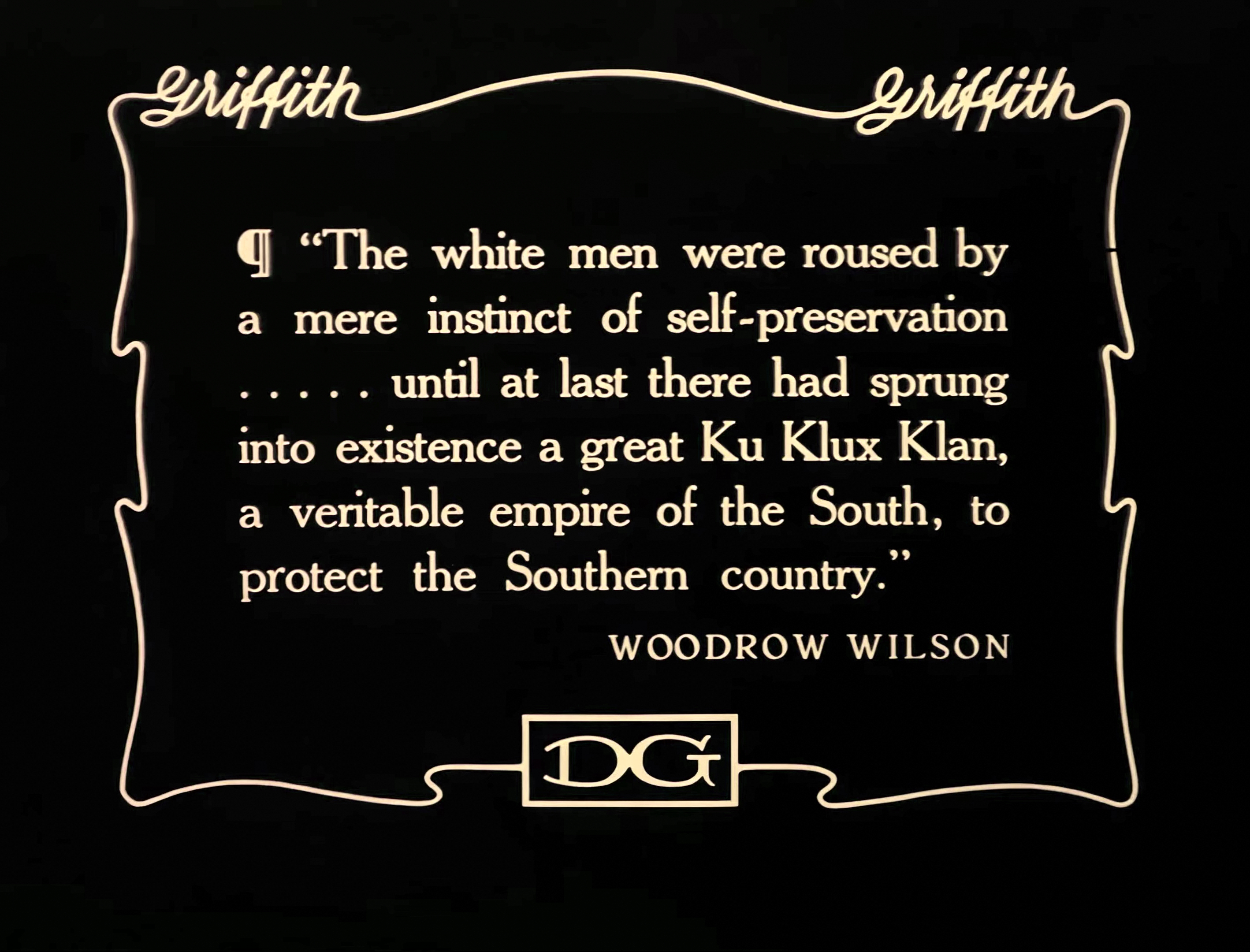
Misquotation from Wilson's History of the American People as reproduced in the film The Birth of a Nation.

During Wilson's presidency, D. W. Griffith's film The Birth of a Nation (1915) was the first motion picture to be screened in the White House. Wilson agreed to screen the film at the urging of Thomas Dixon Jr., a Johns Hopkins classmate who wrote the book on which The Birth of a Nation was based. The film, while revolutionary in its cinematic technique, glorified the Ku Klux Klan and portrayed black people as uncouth and uncivilized.

Wilson, and only Wilson, is quoted (three times) in the film as a scholar of American history. Wilson made no protest over the misquotation of his words. According to some historians, after seeing the film, Wilson felt Dixon had misrepresented his views. In his book, quoted in the film, he argued that the reason so many Southerners joined the Klan was desperation brought about by abusive Reconstruction-era governments. In terms of Reconstruction, Wilson held the common southern view that the South was demoralized by northern carpetbaggers and that overreach on the part of the Radical Republicans justified extreme measures to reestablish white Democratic control of Southern state governments. Dixon has been described as a "professional racist", who used both his pen and pulpit (as a Baptist minister) to promote white supremacy, and it is highly unlikely that Wilson was not well aware of Dixon's views before the screening.

Though Wilson was not initially critical of the film, he increasingly distanced himself from it as a public backlash began to mount. The White House screening was initially used to promote the film. Dixon was able to attract prominent figures for other screenings, and overcome attempts to block the film's release by claiming that Birth of a Nation was endorsed by the President. Not until April 30, 1915, months after the White House screening, did Wilson release to the press a letter his chief of staff, Joseph Tumulty, had written on his behalf to a member of Congress who had objected to the screening. The letter stated that Wilson had been "unaware of the character of the play before it was presented and has at no time expressed his approbation of it. Its exhibition at the White House was a courtesy extended to an old acquaintance." Wilson issued this press release reluctantly, however, and under political pressure. Wilson did enjoy the film, and in private correspondence with Griffith, congratulated him on a "splendid production".

Historians have generally concluded that Wilson probably said that The Birth of a Nation was like "writing history with lightning", but reject the allegation that Wilson remarked, "My only regret is that it is all so terribly true."

== Views on European immigrants and other minorities ==
Wilson briefly succumbed to the widespread prejudice expressed against some Eastern European and Southern European immigrants. In the last volume of A History of the American People, he wrote of them as coming out "of the lower class from the south of Italy and men of the meaner sort of Hungary and Poland, men out of the ranks where there was neither skill nor intelligence" and described the situation "as if the countries of the south of Europe were disburdening themselves of the more sordid and hapless elements of their population; and they came in numbers which increased from year to year". Nevertheless, neither Wilson the academic nor Wilson the politician seems to have harbored any genuine animus against these groups. Later on, after Wilson became president, his speeches revealed appreciation for the contributions of all European immigrants had made to the United States, as well as his belief that their arrival had invigorated American democracy and freedom. Wilson vetoed immigration restriction bills twice, saying that "some of the best stuff of America has come out of foreign lands, and some of the best stuff in America is in the men who are naturalized citizens of the United States". He consistently expressed the belief that all members of the white race could and should be integrated into American society as equals regardless of heritage. This was a recognition that Wilson never extended to black Americans.

Wilson inherited the dilemma of how to best handle the colonies the United States had acquired after the Spanish–American War. Wilson granted Filipinos greater self-government and in 1916 signed the Jones Act, promising the Philippines independence in thirty years. In 1917, Wilson signed the Jones–Shafroth Act, granting greater self-government to Puerto Rico and granting statutory citizenship to Puerto Ricans.

Despite his disposition against a racial equality amendment binding on all conference participants, Wilson did insist that Poland and other eastern European countries (whose borders were carved out of the defeated empires of the Central Powers following the outcome of the war) ratify binding treaties obligating them to protect the rights of minorities, mainly Jews, within their own borders.

Further dispelling claims he harbored anti-Semitic prejudices, Wilson appointed the first Jewish American to the Supreme Court, Louis Brandeis. Wilson did so knowing that as both a Jew and a staunch progressive, Brandeis would be a divisive nominee who would face an uphill confirmation. Brandeis vividly contrasted with Wilson's first appointment, the openly racist and personally belligerent James McReynolds, who, prior to joining the court, had served as Wilson's first attorney general. On a personal level, McReynolds was widely seen by his peers as a mean-spirited bigot, whose disrespect was so extreme he was known to at times turn his chair around to face the wall when prominent African-American attorneys addressed the court during oral arguments. A fervent anti-Semite, McReynolds refused to sign opinions by any of his Jewish colleagues on the court.

Although Wilson appointed easily the most overtly intolerant judge in modern times (if not ever) in the form of McReynolds, his legacy to the Supreme Court was overall more favorable towards racial equality than not. While Brandeis and McReynolds were appointees who cancelled each other out ideologically, Wilson's third appointment to the bench, John Hessin Clarke, was a progressive who aligned himself closely with Brandeis and the Court's liberal wing. This point also requires context, however; whereas Brandeis and McReynolds served until 1939 and 1941 respectively, Clarke resigned from his lifetime appointment in 1922, after barely five years on the bench. Among his reasons for quitting, Clarke cited bullying from McReynolds as at least partial motivation. Though the Supreme Court handed down several major civil rights decisions during Wilson's presidency, it was rare for any of these rulings to be made by a narrow or vulnerable majority of the court; many, in fact, were unanimous, and it may have never been the case that the support of either or even both Brandeis and Clarke swung the verdict. In several instances, however, McReynolds was the leading and often lone dissenting opinion. Ultimately, McReynolds sat on the Court longer than any other Wilson appointee, being both the first and last Wilson nominee on the U.S. Supreme Court. Unlike his other prominent racist appointments, Wilson purportedly expressed remorse over McReynolds, allegedly calling his appointment his "greatest regret".

== Aftermath ==
=== Assessment ===
Ross Kennedy writes that Wilson's support of segregation complied with predominant public opinion. A. Scott Berg argues Wilson accepted segregation as part of a policy to "promote racial progress by shocking the social system as little as possible." The ultimate result of this policy would be an unprecedented expansion of segregation within the federal bureaucracy; with fewer opportunities for employment and promotion open to African Americans than before. Historian Kendrick Clements argues that "Wilson had none of the crude, vicious racism of James K. Vardaman or Benjamin R. Tillman, but he was insensitive to African-American feelings and aspirations."

In an op-ed for The New York Times, historian David Greenberg defended Wilson's legacy. He commented that while Wilson harbored racist sentiments, he never "endorsed or admired" the KKK, as has been claimed. According to Greenberg, the quotes used for Birth of a Nation lack context and in actuality Wilson publicly decried the Klan as "lawless," "reckless" and "malicious". Wilson also wrote of the Klan's actions as "brutal crimes" where "the innocent suffered with the guilty; a reign of terror was brought on, and society was infinitely more disturbed than defended."

=== Legacy ===
In some areas, it can be definitively said that it would be decades before African Americans recovered from Wilson's racist policies. Wilson's successor, Warren Harding, has been called by historians an incredibly rare example for the time period of a man devoid of racial prejudice. However, Harding found it impossible to turn back much of the adverse racial policies instituted under his predecessor. Harding did appoint African Americans to high-level positions in the Department of Labor and Department of the Interior, and numerous blacks were hired in other federal agencies and departments. Harding proved both politically reluctant and unable to return African Americans to several positions they had traditionally held prior to Wilson's tenure. Though some improvements took place, Harding did not abolish segregation in federal offices, very much to the disappointment of his black supporters.

Steps towards a desegregated military did not commence until the late 1940s under Harry Truman, and the Wilsonian policy of barring black servicemen from combat remained mostly in place through World War II. Though African American employment in the federal government rebounded under Herbert Hoover, segregation of workspaces and "whites only" hiring did not begin to see serious reversal until the administration of John F. Kennedy in the early 1960s.

== See also ==
- Nadir of American race relations
- Civil rights movement (1896–1954)
- W.E.B. DuBois
- Racism in the United States
- Progressive Era
- Silent Parade

== Sources ==
- Auchincloss, Louis (2000). Woodrow Wilson. Viking. ISBN 978-0-670-88904-4.
- Berg, A. Scott (2013). Wilson. Simon & Schuster. ISBN 978-0-7432-0675-4.
- Brauer, Carl M. (2002). "John F. Kennedy". In Graff, Henry (ed.). The Presidents: A Reference History (2nd ed.). Macmillan Library Reference USA. pp. 481–498. ISBN 0-684-80551-0.
- Cooper, John Milton Jr. (2009). Woodrow Wilson. Knopf Doubleday Publishing Group. ISBN 9780307273017.
- Dallek, Robert (2003). An Unfinished Life: John F. Kennedy, 1917–1963. Boston: Little, Brown and Co. ISBN 978-0-316-17238-7.
- Dean, John W. (2004). Warren Harding: The 29th President, 1921–1923. The American Presidents Series. Henry Holt and Co. ISBN 978-0-8050-6956-3.
- Garcia, George F. (January 1, 1980). "Black Disaffection From the Republican Party During the Presidency of Herbert Hoover, 1928–1932". The Annals of Iowa. 45 (6): 462–477. doi:10.17077/0003-4827.8734. ISSN 0003-4827.
- MacMillan, Margaret (2003). Paris 1919: Six Months That Changed the World. Random House. ISBN 0-375-76052-0.
- Patterson, James (1996). Grand Expectations: The United States 19451974. Oxford University Press. ISBN 978-0195117974.
- Trani, Eugene P.; Wilson, David L. (1977). The Presidency of Warren G. Harding. American Presidency. The Regents Press of Kansas. ISBN 978-0-7006-0152-3.
- White, William Allen (2007) [1925]. Woodrow Wilson – The Man, His Times and His Task. Read Books. ISBN 978-1-4067-7685-0.
