= List of The New York Times number-one books of 2003 =

The American daily newspaper The New York Times publishes multiple weekly lists ranking the best selling books in the United States. The lists are split into three genres—fiction, nonfiction and children's books. Both the fiction and nonfiction lists are further split into multiple lists.

== Fiction ==
The following list ranks the number-one best selling fiction books, in the hardcover fiction category. The Da Vinci Code dominated the year, spending a cumulative 20 weeks at the top. Sales continued strong into 2004.

Date	Book	Author
January 5	Prey	Michael Crichton
January 12	The Lovely Bones	Alice Sebold
January 19	The Lovely Bones	Alice Sebold
January 26	Crossroads of Twilight	Robert Jordan
February 2	Crossroads of Twilight	Robert Jordan
February 9	The Lovely Bones	Alice Sebold
February 16	The Lovely Bones	Alice Sebold
February 23	The King of Torts	John Grisham
March 2	The King of Torts	John Grisham
March 9	The King of Torts	John Grisham
March 16	The King of Torts	John Grisham
March 23	The Jester	James Patterson and Andrew Gross
March 30	The King of Torts	John Grisham
April 6	The Da Vinci Code	Dan Brown
April 13	The Da Vinci Code	Dan Brown
April 20	Birthright	Nora Roberts
April 27	Armageddon	Tim LaHaye and Jerry B. Jenkins
May 4	Armageddon	Tim LaHaye and Jerry B. Jenkins
May 11	Armageddon	Tim LaHaye and Jerry B. Jenkins
May 18	Armageddon	Tim LaHaye and Jerry B. Jenkins
May 25	Armageddon	Tim LaHaye and Jerry B. Jenkins
June 1	Naked Prey	John Sandford
June 8	The Da Vinci Code	Dan Brown
June 15	The Da Vinci Code	Dan Brown
June 22	The Da Vinci Code	Dan Brown
June 29	The Lake House	James Patterson
July 6	The Da Vinci Code	Dan Brown
July 13	The Da Vinci Code	Dan Brown
July 20	Johnny Angel	Danielle Steel
July 27	The Da Vinci Code	Dan Brown
August 3	To the Nines	Janet Evanovich
August 10	The Da Vinci Code	Dan Brown
August 17	The Da Vinci Code	Dan Brown
August 24	The Da Vinci Code	Dan Brown
August 31	The Teeth of the Tiger	Tom Clancy
September 7	The Teeth of the Tiger	Tom Clancy
September 14	The Da Vinci Code	Dan Brown
September 21	The Da Vinci Code	Dan Brown
September 28	Bleachers	John Grisham
October 5	Bleachers	John Grisham
October 12	The Five People You Meet in Heaven	Mitch Albom
October 19	The Five People You Meet in Heaven	Mitch Albom
October 26	The Five People You Meet in Heaven	Mitch Albom
November 2	Blow Fly	Patricia Cornwell
November 9	The Five People You Meet in Heaven	Mitch Albom
November 16	The Da Vinci Code	Dan Brown
November 23	The Da Vinci Code	Dan Brown
November 30	The Da Vinci Code	Dan Brown
December 7	The Da Vinci Code	Dan Brown
December 14	The Da Vinci Code	Dan Brown
December 21	The Da Vinci Code	Dan Brown
December 28	The Da Vinci Code	Dan Brown

== Nonfiction ==
The following list ranks the number-one best selling nonfiction books, in the hardcover nonfiction category.

Date	Book	Author
January 5	Bush at War	Bob Woodward
January 12	Bush at War	Bob Woodward
January 19	Portrait of a Killer	Patricia Cornwell
January 26	Bush at War	Bob Woodward
February 2	The Savage Nation	Michael Savage
February 9	The Savage Nation	Michael Savage
February 16	What Should I Do with My Life?	Po Bronson
February 23	The Savage Nation	Michael Savage
March 2	The Savage Nation	Michael Savage
March 9	Stupid White Men	Michael Moore
March 16	Stupid White Men	Michael Moore
March 23	Devil in the White City	Erik Larson
March 30	The Savage Nation	Michael Savage
April 6	Stupid White Men	Michael Moore
April 13	Leap of Faith	Queen Noor
April 20	Leap of Faith	Queen Noor
April 27	What Should I Do with My Life?	Po Bronson
May 4	Leap of Faith	Queen Noor
May 11	Leap of Faith	Queen Noor
May 18	Leap of Faith	Queen Noor
May 25	Leap of Faith	Queen Noor
June 1	An Unfinished Life	Robert Dallek
June 8	An Unfinished Life	Robert Dallek
June 15	An Unfinished Life	Robert Dallek
June 22	An Unfinished Life	Robert Dallek
June 29	Living History	Hillary Rodham Clinton
July 6	Living History	Hillary Rodham Clinton
July 13	Living History	Hillary Rodham Clinton
July 20	Living History	Hillary Rodham Clinton
July 27	Living History	Hillary Rodham Clinton
August 3	Kate Remembered	A. Scott Berg
August 10	Kate Remembered	A. Scott Berg
August 17	Kate Remembered	A. Scott Berg
August 24	Kate Remembered	A. Scott Berg
August 31	Kate Remembered	A. Scott Berg
September 7	Lies and the Lying Liars Who Tell Them	Al Franken
September 14	Lies and the Lying Liars Who Tell Them	Al Franken
September 21	Lies and the Lying Liars Who Tell Them	Al Franken
September 28	Lies and the Lying Liars Who Tell Them	Al Franken
October 5	Lies and the Lying Liars Who Tell Them	Al Franken
October 12	Who's Looking Out for You?	Bill O'Reilly
October 19	Lies and the Lying Liars Who Tell Them	Al Franken
October 26	Dude, Where's My Country?	Michael Moore
November 2	Dude, Where's My Country?	Michael Moore
November 9	Dude, Where's My Country?	Michael Moore
November 16	A Royal Duty	Paul Burrell
November 23	Dude, Where's My Country?	Michael Moore
November 30	I Am a Soldier Too	Rick Bragg
December 7	Dude, Where's My Country?	Michael Moore
December 14	Dude, Where's My Country?	Michael Moore
December 21	Who's Looking Out For You?	Bill O'Reilly
December 28	Who's Looking Out For You?	Bill O'Reilly

== See also ==
- Publishers Weekly list of bestselling novels in the United States in the 2000s
