= Editorial board =

Group of experts that dictate a publication's editorial policy

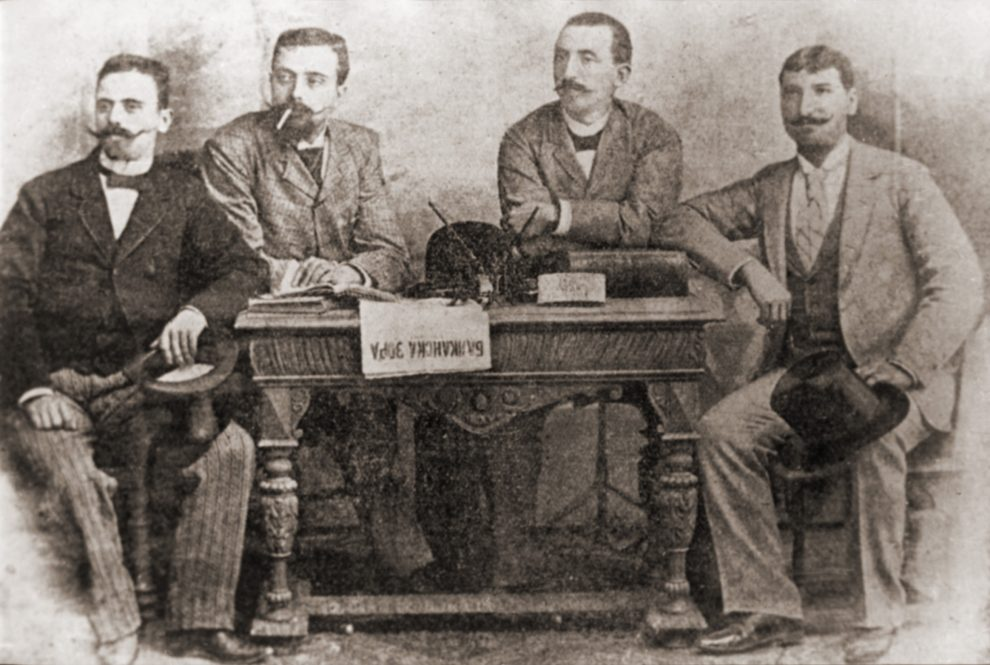

The editorial board is a group of editors, writers, and other people who are charged with implementing a publication's approach to editorials and other opinion pieces. The editorials published normally represent the views or goals of the publication's owner or publisher.

== Mass media ==
At a newspaper, the editorial board usually consists of the editor responsible for the editorial page and editorial writers. Some newspapers include other personnel as well. Some editorial writers may also have other roles in the publication. Editorial boards for magazines may include experts in the subject area that the magazine focuses on, and larger magazines may have several editorial boards grouped by subject. An executive editorial board, which usually includes the executive editor and representatives from the subject-focus boards, may oversee these subject boards.

Editorial boards meet regularly to discuss the latest news and opinion trends and to discuss what the publication should say on a range of issues, including current events. They will then decide who will write which editorials and for what day. When such an editorial appears in a newspaper, it is considered the institutional opinion of that newspaper, and the resulting pieces are rarely signed by the individual primarily responsible for writing it. At some newspapers, the editorial board will also review wire service and syndicated columns for inclusion on the editorial page and the op-ed page. Book and magazine publishers will often use their editorial boards to review or select manuscripts or articles, and sometimes to check facts. Book publishers may also make use of editorial boards, using subject experts to select manuscripts. Editorial boards are less common for broadcasters, as typical television news programs rarely include opinion content.

A typical editorial board for a newspaper has three or four employees. In early 2023, the editorial board for The New York Times comprised 14 employees, all from its Opinion department. Some newspapers, particularly small ones, do not have an editorial board, choosing instead to rely on the judgment of a single editorial page editor.

In the 1700s, if any editorial were published, it had typically written by the owner or was an op-ed. In the 1800s, subscribers wanted to know the opinion of the individual, such as Horace Greeley. In the US, the trend towards unsigned editorials began before 1900, especially at politically conservative newspapers, and when demand surged for signed, analytical content, newspapers turned to syndicated columnists to fill the gap.

The editorial board meeting ran by Phyllis E. Grann at Putnam was called the "Thursday Morning Breakfast Meeting." The meeting was described in New York Magazine as, "8:30 event had a war-room atmosphere, with representatives of every department--editorial, publicity, sales and marketing--reporting in to Grann, who made decisions like a Mike Milken-style bond trader, constantly evaluation and re-evaluating her positions."

Some editorial boards additionally publish blogs, where they can publish additional information and interact with readers. Early editorial board blogs, such as CBS's Public Eye blog, were associated with reporting scandals.

== Academic journals ==
Almost all academic journals have an editorial board consisting of selected, unpaid experts in the academic field covered by a journal. This is almost always an honorary position, although board members sometimes provide peer review of submissions. A member may be asked to review several manuscripts per year and may edit a special issue. The members may also be consulted regarding new regulations at the journal. They are expected to promote the journal among their peers.

== See also ==
- Editorial – Journalism genre
- Op-ed – Type of opinion-expressing written pieces
