= WowOwow =

Defunct website targeted at women

wowOwow
- Website type: Women's website
- Available in: English
- Website: wowowow.com
- Launched: March 9, 2008

wowOwow was a U.S.-based website publication run by Joni Evans.

== History ==
The website was launched by chief executive officer Joni Evans, Mary Wells Lawrence, Liz Smith, Lesley Stahl and Peggy Noonan in March 2008.

In September 2010 the project was merged into PureWow, aimed at a younger audience, and the website redirects to the newer one.

== Contributors ==
Website contributors included Marlo Thomas, Candice Bergen, Lily Tomlin, Whoopi Goldberg, Jane Wagner, Joan Ganz Cooney, Sheila Nevins, author Julia Reed, Joan Juliet Buck, Cynthia McFadden, Jean Chatzky and "Miss Manners" Judith Martin.

== Content ==
The website includes stories written by the wowOwow contributors, as well as wowOwow "Friends," in the "A Friend Stopped By" section of the website. Their stories vary from one or two sentences in response to the "Question of the Day" feature to several pages of commentary, diary format reporting, or transcribed conversations and interviews. News and political topics covered include the 2008 presidential election, the death of Tim Russert, and Iraq.

wowOwow "Friend" Adelle Lutz has covered the aftermath of Cyclone Nargis in East Asia from the Burma/Thailand border, wowOwow "Friend" actress Ashley Judd has contributed her diaries from Rwanda, and wowOwow "Friend" Monica Crowley has provided political opinion pieces on such topics as oil prices and Saudi Arabian leadership.
