= Lee Bailey (writer) =

American author (1926–2003)

Lee Bailey (November 15, 1926 – October 16, 2003) was an authority on luxurious life styles, and was respected for his works of writing, photography, cooking, and work as an interior designer.

He was born in Bunkie, Louisiana. He was educated at the Parsons School of Design (class of 1950), after serving in the army from 1945 to 1946. For 6 years he taught at Tulane, then went on to teach at Parsons. From 1974 to 1987 he owned and operated the Lee Bailey Store in New York City, in addition to a design store (also in New York), and a boutique in Southampton, N.Y. In between 1983 and 1993, he published 12 books on lifestyle, entertaining, and cooking. He contributed articles to The New York Times, The Los Angeles Times, Australian Vogue, and House and Garden. For Food and Wine Magazine, he was an editor and contributing author. His residences included a Manhattan penthouse and a summer home with formal gardens in Bridgehampton, N.Y. At these homes he entertained lavishly, and hosted many dinner parties. People he entertained included: journalist Nora Ephron, actress Elaine Stritch, and society columnist Liz Smith.

He died in his apartment in Chelsea, N.Y. following a series of strokes.

Bailey's cousin is writer-stylist Denise Gee, author of five books focused on Southern food & entertaining and home design.

== Books ==
- "Lee Bailey's The Way I Cook: 1,300 Favorite Recipes" (1996)
- "Lee Bailey's Great Meals for Family and Friends (RecipeEasel)" (1996)
- "Lee Bailey's Portable Food" (1996)
- "Lee Bailey's Country Desserts: Cakes, Cookies, Ice Creams, Pies, Puddings, and More" (1995)
- "Lee Bailey's Dinners At Home" (1995)
- "Lee Bailey's Onions" (1995)
- "Lee Bailey's Berries" (1994)
- "Lee Bailey's Long Weekends: Recipes for Good Food and Easy Living" (1994)
- "Lee Bailey's New Orleans: Good Food and Glorious Houses" (1993)
- "Lee Bailey's Corn" (1993)
- "Lee Bailey's Tomatoes" (1992)
- "Lee Bailey's Cooking For Friends: Good Simple Food for Entertaining Friends Everywhere " (1992)
- "Lee Bailey's California Wine Country Cooking" (1991)
- "Lee Bailey's Small Bouquets: A Gift for All Seasons" (1990)
- "Lee Bailey's Southern Food and Plantations Houses" (1990)
- "Lee Bailey's Soup Meals: Main Event Soups in Year-round Menus" (1989)
- "Lee Bailey's Country Desserts" (1988)
- "Lee Bailey's Good Parties" (1986)
- "Lee Bailey's Country Flowers: Gardening and Bouquets from Spring to Fall" (1985)
- "Lee Bailey's City Food: Recipes for Good Food and Easy Living" (1984)
- "Lee Bailey's Country Weekends: Recipes for Good Food and Easy Living" (1983)
