= Lesley Stahl =

American journalist (born 1941)

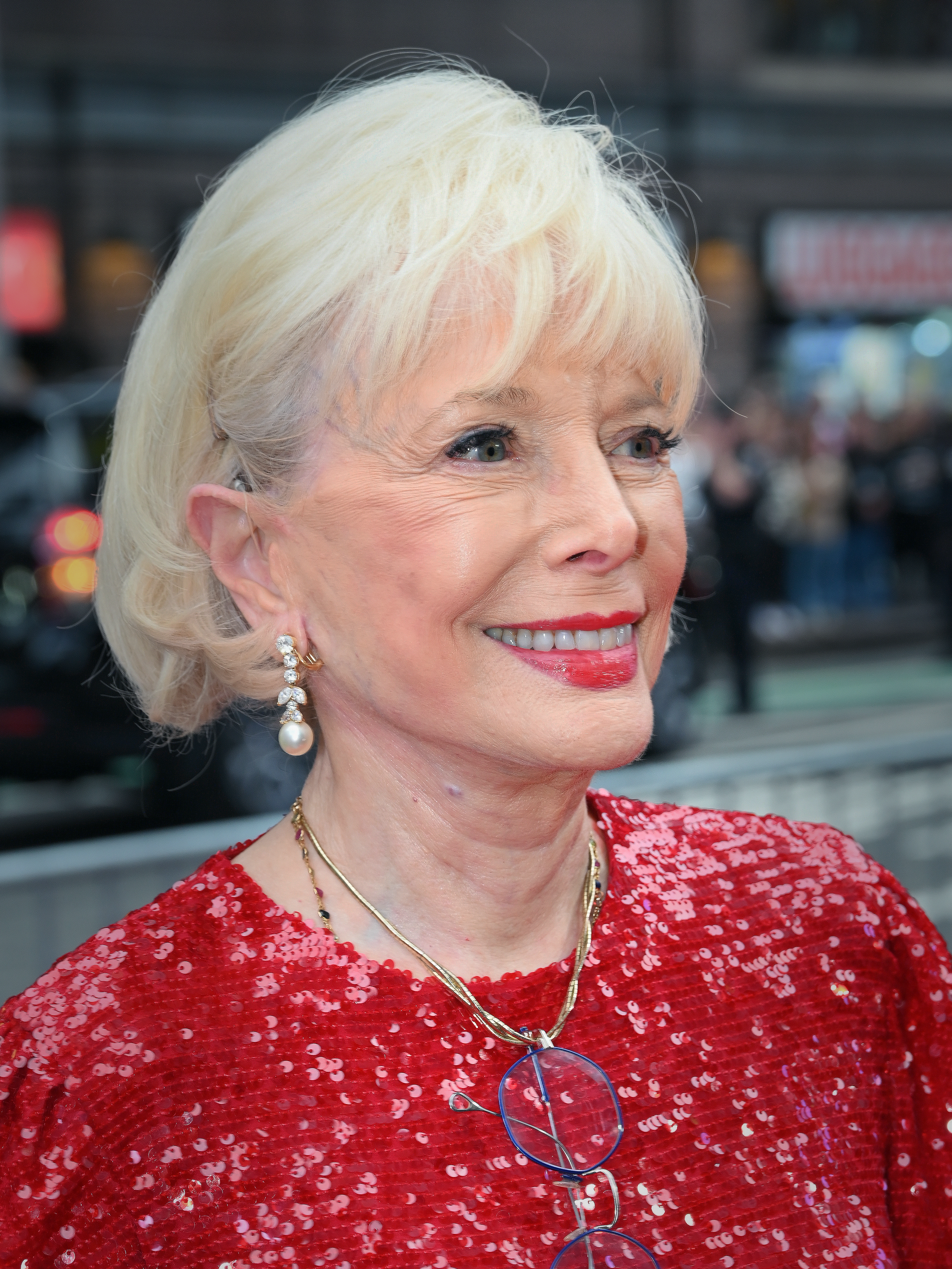
- Stahl in 2025
- Born: December 16, 1941 (age 84); Lynn, Massachusetts, U.S.
- Education: Wheaton College (BA)
- Occupation: News reporter
- Years active: 1971–present
- Notable credit(s): Face the Nation moderator (1983–1991); America Tonight Anchor (1990–1991); 60 Minutes Correspondent (1991–present); 48 Hours Host (2002–2004)
- Spouse(s): Jeffrey Gordon (m. 1964; div. 1967) Aaron Latham (m. 1977; died 2022)
- Children: 1

Lesley Rene Stahl (born December 16, 1941) is an American television journalist. She has spent most of her career with CBS News, where she began as a producer in 1971. Since 1991, she has reported for CBS's 60 Minutes. She is known for her news and television investigations and award-winning foreign reporting. For her body of work she has earned various journalism awards including a Lifetime Achievement News and Documentary Emmy Award in 2003 for overall excellence in reporting.

Prior to joining 60 Minutes, Stahl served as CBS News White House correspondent – the first woman to hold that job – during the Jimmy Carter and Ronald Reagan presidencies and part of the term of George H. W. Bush. Her reports appeared frequently on the CBS Evening News, first with Walter Cronkite then with Dan Rather and on other CBS News broadcasts. During much of that time, she also served as moderator of Face the Nation, CBS News's Sunday public affairs broadcast from September 1983 to May 1991. As a moderator on Face the Nation, she interviewed world leaders, including Margaret Thatcher, Boris Yeltsin and Yasser Arafat. From 1990 to 1991, she was co-host with Charles Kuralt of America Tonight, a daily CBS News late-night broadcast of interviews and essays.

== Early life and education ==
Stahl was born in 1941 to a Jewish family in the Boston suburb of Lynn, Massachusetts, and was raised in Swampscott, Massachusetts. She is the daughter of Dorothy J. (née Tishler) and Louis E. Stahl, a food company executive. She attended Wheaton College in Massachusetts, where she was an honors graduate, majoring in history.

== Career ==
Throughout her 55-year career in journalism, Stahl has covered such iconic moments in United States history as the Watergate scandal in 1972, the impeachment hearings of President Nixon in 1974, the 1981 assassination attempt on President Reagan and the 1991 Gulf War. She reported on the U.S./Russian summit meetings and the economic summits of the industrialized countries, as well as the national political conventions and election nights throughout her career. In her TV news career, she has investigated the enhanced interrogation methods against Al Qaeda during the Iraq War, the cruelty Saddam Hussein inflicted on Iraqi children, in addition to examining practices within Guantánamo Bay and operatives. She has also reported on tensions within the Middle East and the Israeli–Palestinian conflict.

=== 1970s ===
Stahl began her television broadcasting career at Boston's original Channel 5, WHDH-TV, as a producer and on-air reporter. She joined CBS News in 1971, and became a correspondent in 1974. "I was born on my 30th birthday," Stahl would later write about the experience. "Everything up till then was prenatal." Stahl credits her CBS News hire to the Federal Communications Commission's 1972 inclusion of women in its affirmative action mandate: "the television networks were scouring the country for women and blacks with any news experience at all. A friend in New York had called to tell me about a memo floating around CBS News mandating that 'the next reporter we hire will be a woman.'" According to Stahl, Connie Chung and Bernard Shaw were "the two other 'affirmative action babies' in what became known as the Class of '72." Stahl reflected in an interview on her early days at CBS how, on the night of the '72 Nixon-McGovern election returns, she found her on-air studio chair marked with masking tape, not with her name as with her colleagues, but with "Female". Stahl was the mentor of CBS news producer Susan Zirinsky.

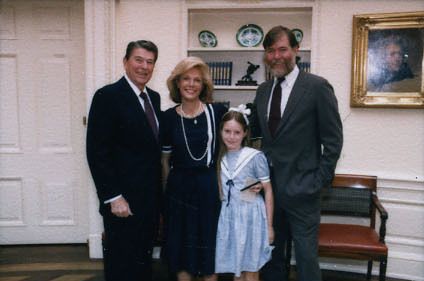
Stahl and her family with President Ronald Reagan in 1986

Stahl's prominence grew after she covered Watergate:

I found an apartment in the Watergate complex, moved all my stuff from Boston, and didn't miss a day of work. ... June 1972. Most of the reporters in our bureau were on the road, covering the presidential campaign. Thus, I was sent out to cover the arrest of some men who had broken into one of the buildings in the Watergate complex. That CBS let me, the newest hire, hold on to Watergate as an assignment was a measure of how unimportant the story seemed: ... I was the only television reporter covering the early court appearances. When the five Watergate burglars asked for a bail reduction, I got my first scoop. Unlike my competitors, I was able to identify them. The next time the cameraman listened when I said, 'Roll! That's them!' And so CBS was the only network to get pictures of the burglars. I was a hero at the bureau.

=== 1980s ===
Stahl was the moderator of Face the Nation between September 1983 and May 1991. She went on to become White House correspondent during the presidencies of Jimmy Carter, Ronald Reagan and George H. W. Bush. At the Republican Convention of 1980, she broke the news on CBS that Reagan's negotiations with ex-President Gerald Ford had broken down and the answer to the question of who would be vice-presidential nominee was: "It's Bush! Yes, it's Bush!" George H. W. Bush had been standing perhaps not far away, largely off by himself, looking discouraged because he was sure he wasn't going to be chosen. During her time at CBS she covered the 1981 assassination attempt on President Reagan, and the 1991 Gulf War. She reported on the U.S.-Russian summit meetings and the economic summits of the industrialized countries, as well as the national political conventions and election nights, throughout her career.

=== 1990s ===
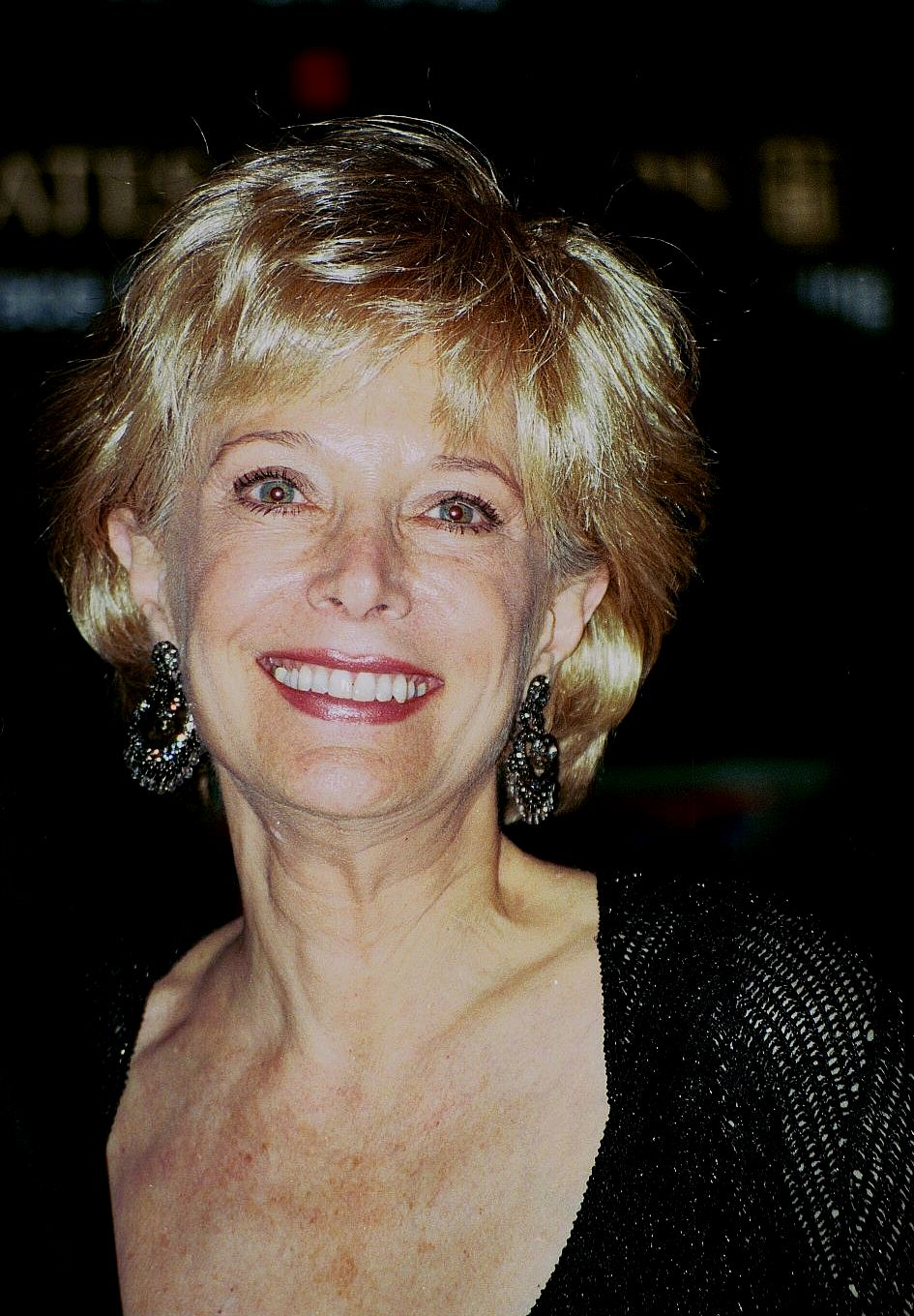
Stahl in 1998

In 1998, she appeared on the NBC sitcom Frasier, playing herself in the episode "Desperately Seeking Closure". Stahl has written two books, the first of which, Reporting Live, was published in 1999:

I had decided by August 1989, in my 48th year, that I had already had the best day of my life. ... Then we went to Rwanda to see the mountain gorillas, Dian Fossey's gorillas in the mist. ... After two and a half hours ... there they were: two baby gorillas frolicking like any four-year-olds. We snapped and stared. We were right there, in their lives, in the middle of their open-air house. And then the silverback, the patriarch, seemed to welcome us, as three females kept grooming him. ... We spent one hour in their world, watching them tumble and wrestle, nurse their babies, swing in the trees, forage for food—vines, leaves, berries— ... so close that a female reached out to touch me. When I went to reciprocate, the guide hit my arm with a stick. "Non, madame. C'est inderdit." ... What I decided that day with the gorillas in Rwanda was that the best day of your life may not have happened yet. No matter what you think.

=== 2000s ===
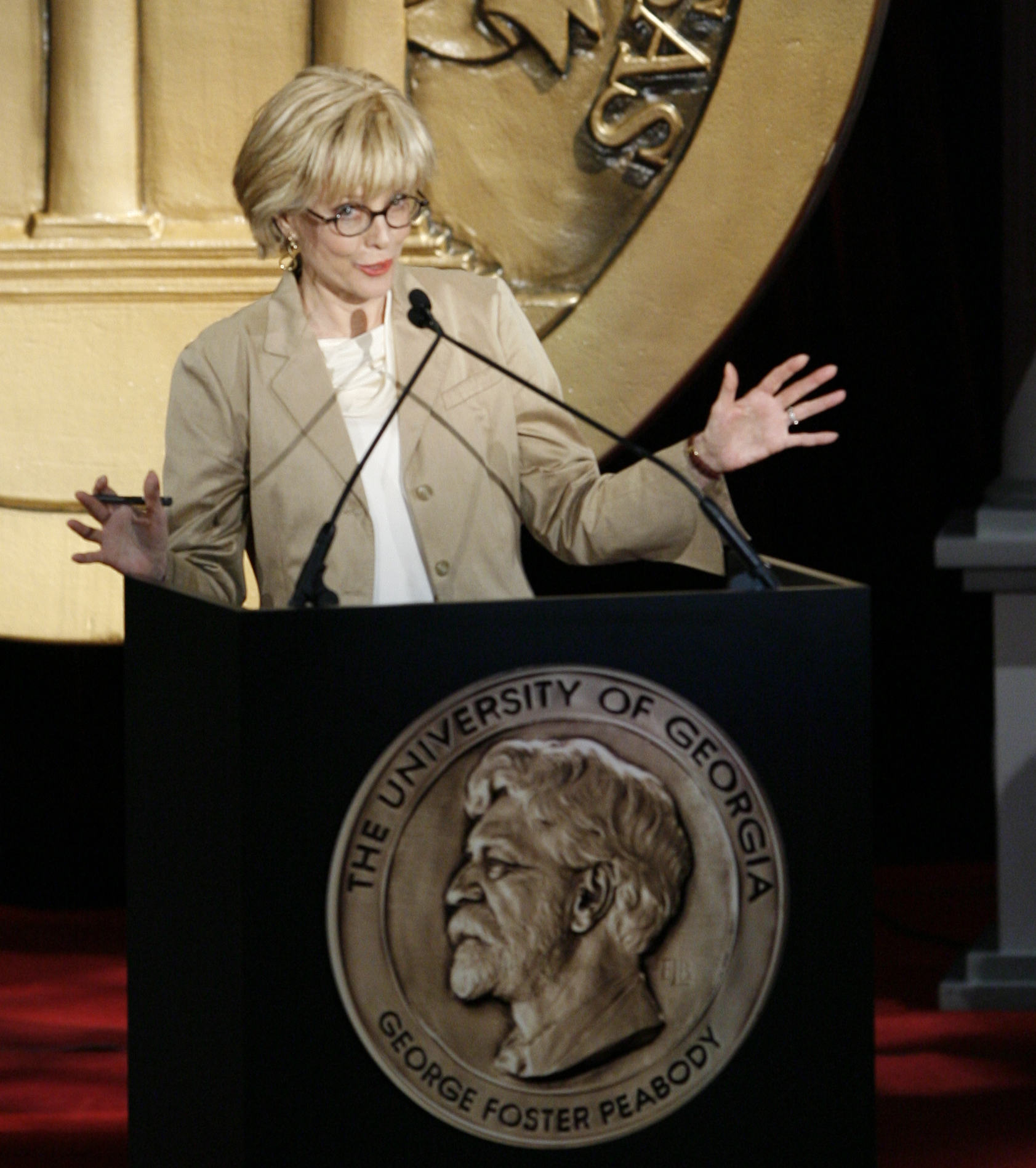
Lesley Stahl hosting the 67th Annual Peabody Awards

In addition, she hosted 48 Hours Investigates from 2002 to 2004. In 2002, Stahl made headlines when Al Gore appeared on 60 Minutes and revealed for the first time that he would not run for president again in 2004. When Katie Couric was hired, CBS News asked Stahl to reduce her salary by $500,000 to accommodate Couric's salary, bringing her salary down to $1.8 million.

In 2007, Stahl gained attraction for her interview with the then-French President Nicolas Sarkozy for a 60 Minutes when the President abruptly ended the conversation and walked out, calling it "stupid" and a "big mistake". Sarkozy criticized Stahl for questions regarding his wife, Cecilia. Sarkozy and his wife announced their divorce two weeks after the interview.

Lesley Stahl was a founding member in 2008, along with Liz Smith, Mary Wells Lawrence, and Joni Evans, of wowOwow.com, a website for "women over 40" to talk about culture, politics, and gossip. By the end of 2010 it had merged into PureWow, a Web site aimed at younger women.

=== 2010s ===
In 2014, she served as a correspondent for Years of Living Dangerously, a documentary show about climate change. Her second book, Becoming Grandma: The Joys and Science of the New Grandparenting, which chronicles her own experiences with her grandchildren, was published in 2016.

=== 2020s ===
During the 2020 United States presidential election campaign, Stahl interviewed President Trump on October 20, 2020, for a segment on 60 Minutes. Trump cut short the interview and complained about it on Twitter. On October 22, Trump released the full interview on Facebook, ahead of its planned official release on 60 Minutes on October 25.

In May 2021, Stahl received criticism from LGBTQ advocacy groups for a 60 Minutes special about transgender healthcare. CBS News, the producer of 60 Minutes, reported the special as coming "amid a spate of legislation being introduced in states across the country that would limit care for transgender youth", and said that the special focused on "detransitioners". Advocacy group GLAAD called it "fearmongering about trans youth", while Chase Strangio of the ACLU said that Stahl and others involved with the production "knew exactly the harm they were causing with last night's segment".

== Career timeline ==
- September 1983–May 1991: Face the Nation moderator
- October 1990–March 1991: America Tonight anchor
- March 1991–present: 60 Minutes correspondent
- October 2002–December 2004: 48 Hours host

== Personal life ==
In 1977, Stahl married author Aaron Latham and they have a daughter. Latham died in July 2022 from complications of Parkinson's disease.

On the May 3, 2020, broadcast of 60 Minutes, Stahl revealed that she had been hospitalized with COVID-19. She since recovered.

== Awards and honors ==
She is currently a member of the Council on Foreign Relations. Stahl is also on the Board of Selectors of Jefferson Awards for Public Service.

- Stahl has won 13 News & Documentary Emmy Awards including one for Lifetime Achievement
- 1990 - The Dennis Kauff Journalism Award for lifetime achievement in the news profession.
- 1994 - The Golden Plate Award of the American Academy of Achievement
- 1996 - The Fred Friendly First Amendment Award from Quinnipiac College
- 1996 - Alfred I. duPont-Columbia University Silver Baton for "Punishing Saddam" segment, which exposed the plight of Iraqi citizens, mostly children, suffering the effects of the United Nations sanctions against Iraq.
- 2004 - Gerald Loeb Award for Television Long Form business journalism for "The Jobless Recovery"
- 2008 - A Doctorate of Humane Letters honoris causa from Colgate University
- 2008 - A Doctorate of Humane Letters honoris causa from Loyola College in Maryland.
- 2012 - The Overseas Press Club award
- 2013 - The Edward R. Murrow Award for Overall Excellence in Television
- 2014 - The International Center For Journalists Founders Award for Journalistic Excellence.
- 2015 - The Radio Television Digital News Association's Paul White Award for Lifetime Achievement
- 2021 - Poynter Medal for Lifetime Achievement in Journalism

== Filmography ==
- Madagascar: Escape 2 Africa as Newscaster (voice)
- Frasier: "Desperately Seeking Closure" (S5, E8) as herself
- Marcel the Shell with Shoes On as herself
- Transformers: Rise of the Beasts as herself
- Dexter: Resurrection as herself

== Bibliography ==
- Stahl, Lesley (1999). Reporting Live. Simon & Schuster. ISBN 978-0-684-82930-2.
- Stahl, Lesley (2016). Becoming grandma : the joys and science of the new grandparenting. Blue Rider Press. ISBN 978-0-399-16815-4.

== See also ==
- New Yorkers in journalism

Media offices
| Preceded by George Herman | Face the Nation Moderator; September 18, 1983 – May 19, 1991 | Succeeded by Bob Schieffer |
