= Phyllis E. Grann =

American publisher and editor

Phyllis E. Grann (born September 2, 1937) is a former book editor and publishing executive. She was the first female CEO of a major publishing firm, Penguin Putnam, and one of the most commercially successful publishers in recent history. She was a long-time editor for Knopf Doubleday, and a former CEO of the Putnam Berkley Group and was also CEO of Penguin Putnam. Grann was responsible for publishing many notable and bestselling authors at Penguin including A. Scott Berg, Judy Blume, Tom Clancy, Patricia Cornwell, Sue Grafton, Daniel Silva, and Kurt Vonnegut. At Doubleday Grann acquired and edited Jeffrey Toobin, Tina Brown, Bob Herbert, Ayelet Waldman and Tim Weiner. At Knopf she edited John Darnton.

== Early life ==
Phyllis E. Grann was born in London before World War II to Louisa and Solomon Eitingon. Her mother was British and her father was a Russian Jew who had immigrated to Paris. Grann came to New York as a child in 1940 and graduated The Kew-Forest School in 1958. Grann went on to attend school at Barnard College. Grann told the New York Times about early visits to Scribners book store in her childhood. “My mother used to take me to Scribner’s and would leave me with the saleslady in the children’s department,” she said. “I must have been 10 or 11. She’d just leave me sitting there and reading while she went shopping for an hour. It was quite a feeling, to be surrounded by books like that.”

== Career ==
It has been reported that Grann started her publishing career in 1958 as a secretary for Nelson Doubleday—however, because of timing, it is more likely that she was a secretary for his son, Nelson Doubleday, Jr. From there Grann moved over to an editor position at William Morrow. In 1970 Grann joined Simon & Schuster where she was promoted to run Simon & Schuster's mass market paperback imprint, Pocket Books under then CEO Dick Snyder.

Unhappy at Simon & Schuster, Grann moved over to Putnam in 1976 to become editor-in-chief. According to Simon & Schuster editor Michael Korda, "her dazzling success as both and editor and a businesswoman was to serve as a permanent reminder to Dick (Snyder) that he had lost one of the brightest stars in publishing and made her a competitor." MCA/Universal had purchased Putnam (formerly G. P. Putnam's Sons) in 1975. Stanley Newman, an executive at MCA, Inc. built a new financial strategy model to make Putnam profitable. His model, which Grann ran with, put the emphasis on fewer but more profitable authors who could be published in hardcover and paperback by a coordinated team.

Grann proved to be a formidable publisher who took care of her authors while emphasizing sales and the bottom-line. Grann credited MCA President Lew Wasserman for her own emphasis on caring for her authors saying, "Lew Wasserman taught me that you're only as good as the talent you have under contract and the talent that walks out the door every night. You have to take care of these people." Grann took Putnam from having $10 million in revenue in 1976 to over $100 million by 1983 by building a publishing list around what she called "repeaters," bestselling authors who could turn out annual bestsellers such as Tom Clancy. Prior to this many publishers focused on publishing name authors every three years or so. Grann recognized that authors could be brands and she focused on creating a list that weighed heavily towards the repeaters. By focusing on the repeaters, Grann stated that a publishing company can "afford to spend a lot more on its authors than on the machinery of publishing." Grann also taught editors about the financial ramifications of day-to-day decisions and gave them free rein as long as they made margins.

The 1980s saw the publishing industry move toward heavily discounting hardcover titles (sometimes 40-50% off retail price) to fill the shelves at expanding bookstore chains and price clubs. Here Grann also led the charge as she focused on a "limited number of high-performance books like Tom Clancy's second novel, Red Storm Rising, which sold nearly a million copies in 1986.

Under Grann's guidance, and her "Thursday Morning Breakfast Meetings," Putnam continued to grow—from $100 million in revenue in 1983 to $200 million by 1993 without increasing the number of titles published. Grann described the list of about 75 titles: "25 were repeat bestsellers, 15 were books that we would need a huge campaign to make, 10 were books were just starting things and we didn't know where it was going, and 10 were mistakes we probably shouldn't have published." Her Thursday morning meetings were described as having a war-room meeting with representatives from every department while Grann made quick decisions.

Grann was promoted to CEO of Putnam in 1987.

There were a number of quick changes by Grann between 2001 and 2003. In November 2001 Grann joined Random House as vice-chairman. There was initial speculation that the position was created so that it didn't violate a non-compete clause in Grann's contract with Putnam. A publishing insider said of Random House CEO Peter Olson hiring Grann, "I think maybe instead of buying another company he bought a person." Grann left Random House after only six months citing "boredom" with her advisory role. Grann then returned by January 2003 in a new role as a Senior Editor of the Doubleday Broadway Publishing Group. This new role was to allow Grann to edit and publish about ten titles a year. At the same time Grann was also a member of the advisory board of Leeds Weld & Company, a private equity firm.

Grann retired from Knopf Doubleday in 2011.

== Description ==
Grann was described in a New York magazine article as "a small woman even in heels, with a preternaturally youthful face that leaves you thinking of Barbara Walters.

== Personal life ==
Grann met and married Dr. Victor Grann in 1962 and they have residences in both Westport, Connecticut and Martha's Vineyard, Massachusetts. Her husband is an oncologist and the Director of the Bennett Cancer Center in Stamford, Connecticut. They have three children--David Grann (writer), Edward Grann (filmmaker) and Alison Grann (radiation oncologist).
