= Wilson (book) =

2013 book by A. Scott Berg

- Author: A. Scott Berg
- Language: English
- Subject: Biography
- Genre: Non-fiction
- Publisher: Putnam Publishing Group
- Publication date: September 10, 2013
- Publication place: United States
- Media type: Hardcover
- Pages: 832
- ISBN: 9780399159213
- Preceded by: Kate Remembered

Wilson is a 2013 biography of Woodrow Wilson, the 28th President of the United States, by the Pulitzer Prize-winning author A. Scott Berg. The book is a New York Times Best Seller.

== Background ==
"'After 'Lindbergh,' my publisher asked whom I wanted to write about next,' Berg recalled. 'I said, 'There's one idea I've been carrying in my hip pocket for 35 years. It's Woodrow Wilson.'"

When asked why he spent the last thirteen years writing a biography of Wilson, Berg replied: "The simple answer is that he was the architect of much of the last century and re-drew the map of the world." There were also personal reasons. Berg was given a copy of Gene Smith's When the Cheering Stopped: The Last Years of Woodrow Wilson when he was in the 11th grade, and his "budding obsession" has grown ever since. At 15, he put a picture of Wilson on his bedroom wall, a campaign poster given to him by his brother, Jeff.

The author had four heroes when he was in high school: F. Scott Fitzgerald, Adlai Stevenson, Woodrow Wilson, and Don Quixote. The fact that the first three went to Princeton helped induce Berg to enroll. Berg spent his college years at Princeton, the college Wilson was president of, graduating in 1971. He also taught a class in biography writing while there doing research for the book.

Berg began researching Wilson in 2000. In 2008, he said: "I have an image of him in my mind that is unlike any picture I have seen anywhere else, based on material at Princeton and 35 years of researching and thinking about him." In 2013, he commented: "When most people think of Woodrow Wilson, they see a dour minister's son who never cracked a smile, where in fact he was a man of genuine joy and great sadness. I did not write a diplomatic history or a history of foreign affairs in his life. I wanted the reader to walk through his life and see it with his eyes." He added: "It takes a certain amount of egotism for a biographer to think he has something new to add to the record, and I believe I do."

Berg hesitated before writing the biography, saying: "Yet I'd been afraid of writing about him all my life because I held him so high and he was so overwhelming a figure." Berg visited many of Wilson's homes during his research, including his birthplace, his childhood homes, and the Woodrow Wilson House in Washington, D.C. He said: "Getting a sense of place is extremely important to me as a biographer. And I make a point, as I have in all of my books, to visit as many of the places in the lives of my subjects as possible."

Berg purchased a set of Arthur A. Link's 69-volume compilation of "Wilson's greatest hits" (that Link spent 40 years collecting) as part of his research. He explored other libraries, such as the Library of Congress and the Princeton Library for documents not in Link's collection.

Berg was the first allowed access to the correspondence of the President's second daughter Jessie Woodrow Wilson Sayre, found when her son died a few years ago, as well as the papers of his close friend and doctor, Cary T. Grayson. Berg described the Grayson discovery, found in Grayson's garage, as "trunk loads" of papers. Berg found that Grayson kept "meticulous" notes, covering years of contact with Wilson, especially the last years of his presidency. He said: "You have no idea what a thrill that was, quite wonderful." Berg worked without researchers or secretaries for the thirteen-year research/writing process.

Wilson was always intended to be a single-volume. Berg said: "There are several multi-volume [Wilson biographies], and that's the last thing I wanted to do ... I wanted to write a page-turner, and I think it is."

== Summary ==
The biography is divided into four parts, and then into chapters. Each chapter title is intended to draw a Biblical reference, such as "Ascension", "Baptism", and "Resurrection", using the King James Bible. Each chapter begins with a Bible quote, pointing to Wilson's devout faith.

=== Contents ===
==== Part One ====
- Chapter One – "Ascension." Mark, XVI:19
  Wilson departs New York on December 4, 1918, on the first European trip by a U.S. president.
- Chapter Two – "Providence." Romans, VIII:28
  Wilson is born, December 28, 1856.
- Chapter Three – "Eden." Genesis, XII:1,2
  Wilson enters Princeton.
- Chapter Four – "Sinai." Psalms, CVII:4
  Wilson graduates from Princeton.
- Chapter Five – "Reformation." Romans, XII:2
  Wilson joins the faculty at Princeton.
- Chapter Six – "Advent." I Corinthians, X:13
  Wilson becomes President of Princeton.

==== Part Two ====
- Chapter Seven – "Paul." Acts, IX:3
  Wilson becomes Governor of New Jersey.

==== Part Three ====
- Chapter Eight – "Disciples." John, XII:12-14
  Wilson is elected President of the United States.
- Chapter Nine – "Baptism." Matthew, III:16
  Wilson begins his first term as president.
- Chapter Ten – "Ecclesiastes." Ecclesiastes, III:1-8
  Europe moves towards war.
- Chapter Eleven – "Deliverance." Daniel, VI:20
  Wilson honeymoons with his second wife, Edith.
- Chapter Twelve – "Armageddon." Revelation XI:18
  The U.S. enters the war.

==== Part Four ====
- Chapter Thirteen – "Isaiah." Isaiah, LXI:1
  The Great War ends.
- Chapter Fourteen – "Gethsemane." Matthew, XXVI:36 and Luke, XXII:44
  Wilson returns to Europe.
- Chapter Fifteen – "Passion." Matthew, XXVII, 30–31
  Wilson delivers the Treaty of Versailles to the Senate.
- Chapter Sixteen – "Pieta." John, XIX:40
  Wilson convalescences from a major stroke.
- Chapter Seventeen – "Resurrection." Matthew, XXVIII:20
  Wilson leaves the White House.

== Reception ==
Reviewers, such as Bruce Ramsey, have sought to compare Berg's book with other biographies of Wilson. For The Seattle Times, Ramsay wrote: "Berg's biography has a fine feeling for Wilson and the story of his life, but he does present Wilson mostly from Wilson's point of view. For a more critical look at the 20th century's first war president, the reader will have to look elsewhere, such as Thomas Fleming's 'The Illusion of Victory' (2003)." In The Daily Beast, Michael Kazin wrote that "Berg uncovers few significant details that previous biographers—the best of whom are Arthur Link and John Milton Cooper, Jr.—neglected."

Several reviewers compare Berg's telling unfavorably to John M. Cooper's. The Pittsburgh Post-Gazette said: "He brings nothing new to the conventional evaluation of Wilson the president (for the best treatment, read John M. Cooper's 2009 "Woodrow Wilson")." Publishers Weekly also makes this comparison, with the reviewer stating: "This won't replace John Milton Cooper Jr.'s superb 2009 biography ... ." Bob Blaisdell writing for The Christian Science Monitor goes further, arguing that Berg "lacks what Cooper repeatedly credits Wilson with having: boldness", and comments: "Given a choice of reading, take Cooper's fine and authoritative 'Woodrow Wilson: A Biography,' which is still in print." In The New Yorker, Jill Lepore writes: "A sharp, subtle, and more squarely political biography is Woodrow Wilson by American historian John M. Cooper. When asked about Cooper's book, Berg admitted he had not read it but did glance at it long enough to ensure that the two books began and finished differently. (Note: Berg said: "I went to a bookstore and read the two opening pages and two closing pages just to make sure my opening and closing were not the same thing, and mine were far from it.")

The reviewer in Publishers Weekly questions the use of Biblical chapter titles, saying that "Berg's likening of Wilson's life to biblical stages is overkill." Walter Stahr also questions these appellations. For example, the chapter "Passion", covering the debate in the Senate over the Treaty of Versailles, begins: "And they spit upon him, and took the reed, and smote him on the head." Stahr comments that "Berg apparently wants us to view Wilson as Jesus, reviled and beaten by the Roman soldiers. Does he want us to think that Wilson was the divine Christ?" Jeff Shesol asks a similar question, writing: "Berg's decision to endow each chapter with a biblical title and a passage of scripture raises the question of whether he sees Wilson as a Christ figure or merely as a man with a Christ complex ... ."

Martin Rubin writes in The Washington Times that Berg "succeeds magnificently in elucidating Woodrow Wilson the man" but "as I read on, I felt increasingly that the further Mr. Berg moved from Wilson himself into the wider world, the less satisfying his portrait." Stephen Loosley writes in The Australian that "at times Berg's obvious affection for his subject causes him to be a little too generous." Jeff Shesol agrees, arguing that "Berg is simply too enamored of Wilson to provide a balanced appraisal."

In an essay written specifically in answer to the biography, noted Wilson biographer John Milton Cooper offers his perspective, including this overarching comment: "The quality of the writing in the book, the pleasure in reading it, and the warm human impression it leaves of its subject are the good news. The bad news is that the book leaves out much that it ought to include and includes some that it ought to leave out." As an example of what he felt should have been included, Cooper says: "In spite of the book's strength in depicting Wilson's family life, it is also oddly unsatisfactory about one of its most important figures: his father." As another example, Cooper states: "Equally glaring is the lack of attention to Wilson's thought." Cooper questions Berg's inclusion of the memories of Wilson's wife by saying that "Kristie Miller's excellent biography of Wilson's two wives could have raised red flags about Edith's memory." Cooper not only disputes Berg's framing of Wilson's racism but also his religious perspective, calling into question the use of Bible quotations at the beginning of each chapter. He writes: "Other reviewers have found this practice tiresome; I found it unenlightening and strange." Cooper ends by saying: "To sum up, this biography has much to recommend it, especially the pleasure it affords in reading it. Its shortcomings make it far from balanced or comprehensive, much less "definitive."

Wilson was absent from the longlist for the 2013 National Book Awards.

== Current politics ==
In January 2013, Berg approached The New York Times offering to write a column for the 100th anniversary of Wilson's inauguration and to "contemporize this story and really make it reverberate by writing a kind of open letter to President Obama." In the op-ed, Berg offered the following advice: "All sides should remember Wilson and the single factor that determines the country's glorious successes or crushing failures: cooperation."

During interviews following the release of the book, Berg compared Wilson's diplomacy to then President Barack Obama's handling of the Syrian civil war, saying: "Over the last few weeks, Obama has been addressing the crisis in a very Wilsonian manner, raising the question of whether the United States was meant to be the policeman of the world." In another interview, Berg said that "Wilson is a real model for Obama." When asked during an interview to compare the two presidents, he says: "Certainly they're both considered rather aloof, they both come out of academia, they're both Constitutional scholars ...." Berg admitted that on some days he wrote the book as if it was about Obama. He said: "As I was writing, there were literally days I would say, 'I'm going to forget the name is Wilson. I'll pretend it is Obama. And I will write it as though it is Obama.'"

Barrie Dunsmore sees parallels as well, arguing that "Berg told NPR this past week, 'I found during my research there were documents in which Lodge and other Republicans were talking about opposing any peace that Wilson brought back from Paris, no matter what it was.…so whatever Wilson had, was not going to fly.' Sound familiar?"

== Reviews ==
- Boston Globe – "Berg gives Wilson a fresh look, restoring him to the place he occupied — the idealist in politics."
- Miami Herald – "Berg is a masterful biographer ... [Wilson is] absorbing."
- The Washingtonian – "Marvelously detailed."
- Jeff Shesol, The Washington Post – "... in the end, 'Wilson,' despite its scope, fails to convey the lessons it most wishes to impart."
- Kevin Baker, The New York Times – "A. Scott Berg tells the story of Wilson, the man, very well indeed."
- Book Reporter – "Exhaustively researched and wonderfully written."
- Kirkus Reviews – "Readable, authoritative and, most usefully, inspiring."
- The Washington Times – "The fact is that, for all Mr. Berg's diligent research and revelations about Wilson the man, the biography falls between two stools: too detailed to be introductory, yet not really definitive where it counts most."
- Washington Independent Review of Books – "The problem is not only that Berg praises Wilson: he does not question Wilson."
- Fort Worth Star-Telegram – "An enthralling biography of Woodrow Wilson."
- Library Journal – " ... a thorough, entertaining account ... ."
- Geoffrey Wawro, History Book Club – "Berg's book is enlightening, colorful and a good read."
- The Economist – " ... a detailed account lionising the man ... ."
- The Wall Street Journal – " ... there's no modern lesson in 'Wilson,' other than maybe try to get A. Scott Berg as your biographer."
- The Philly – "Berg's study should remain the standard biography of this tragic figure for a long time."
- Richmond Times-Dispatch – "Berg has produced an insightful and intimate work that is likely to stand as the definitive biography of one of the nation's most consequential leaders."
- Barnes & Noble – "Berg has brought Wilson to life."
- The Oregonian – "Berg rehabilitates Woodrow Wilson."
- Michael Kazin, The Daily Beast – " ... his [Berg's] talent as a biographer tends to overwhelm his desire to be a historian."
- Dallas News – " ... Berg presents a sympathetic but penetrating portrait that is essential reading for anyone interested in Wilson and his times."
- Biographile – " ... Berg has illuminated this influential man like no other biographer before him."
- Buffalo News – "This fine piece of writing is not only highly entertaining, it fills a void in the history of the U.S. presidency and may well become the definitive Wilson biography of our era."
- The Australian – " ... the best single-volume presidential biography since David McCullough's Truman."
- Héctor Tobar, Los Angeles Times – "Magisterial."

== Film version ==
Warner Bros. is negotiating the movie rights to the biography, with Leonardo DiCaprio to star in the title role, as well as serve as producer.
