= Subsidiary right =

A subsidiary right (also called a subright or sub-lease) is the right to produce or publish a product in different formats based on the original material. Subsidiary rights are common in the publishing and entertainment industries, in which subsidiary rights are granted by the author to an agent, publisher, newspaper, or film studio. The holder of these rights can either exercise these rights on their own or can lease or transfer the rights to others. Subsidiary rights can include the rights to publish different formats of the same work (i.e. hardcover, paperback, mass market, audio, and electronic books), to create and publish translations of a work, to publish editions in different countries or regions, to publish an audiobook version, to distribute through book clubs, to adapt a work for film, television, radio, or software, or to create sequels and spinoff material.
