= Kate Remembered =

2003 book by A. Scott Berg

- Author: A. Scott Berg
- Language: English
- Subject: Biography, Memoir
- Genre: Non-fiction
- Publisher: Putnam Publishing Group
- Publication date: July 11, 2003
- Publication place: United States
- Media type: Hardcover
- Pages: 370
- ISBN: 978-0-399-15164-4

Kate Remembered is a book released on July 11, 2003 by A. Scott Berg, which tells the story, life, and his experiences with actress Katharine Hepburn. The book was released 12 days after Hepburn's death at 96 on June 29. The book received mixed reviews.

== Synopsis ==
Published within days of her death at 96, this life of Katharine Hepburn is able to take her to her final hours, following her career from youth to old age. A. Scott Berg knew Hepburn for the last 20 years of her life, and his book is not only the biography of the actress but a tribute to a friend to whom she told the truth about her life, including her loves and pet hates, with an eye to its eventual publication.

== Friendship with Hepburn ==
Berg was a personal friend of Hepburn, after meeting her in 1983. He told her he wanted to write a biography about her life and she helped him, providing information about her life. Berg told Hepburn he would release the book after her death.

== Reception ==
Reviews were mixed after the book was released. Gossip columnist Liz Smith, a friend of Hepburn's, said that Berg's book was "Self-promoting fakery …. Hepburn would have despised it and his betrayal of her friendship."

Berg later issued this written statement via his publisher, G.P. Putnam's Sons:

"Over the last two months, I have been truly shocked at Liz Smith's professional behavior-or, more accurately, her lack thereof," Berg wrote. "My family and friends have reacted with utter disbelief at the level of personal disdain conveyed by Ms. Smith toward someone she barely knows; (indeed, beyond my appearing at one of her Literacy Volunteer events, I've met her but a few times.) And I've heard that people I don't even know are shocked by her personal assault on my reputation, one that stops just short of character assassination."

Cynthia McFadden, executor of Hepburn's will and estate, had similar feelings to Liz Smith's about the book, as did Hepburn's family.

Reviews about the book include: "From the start, Berg's book is a paean of praise and love...."
