= A. Scott Berg =

American biographer (born 1949)

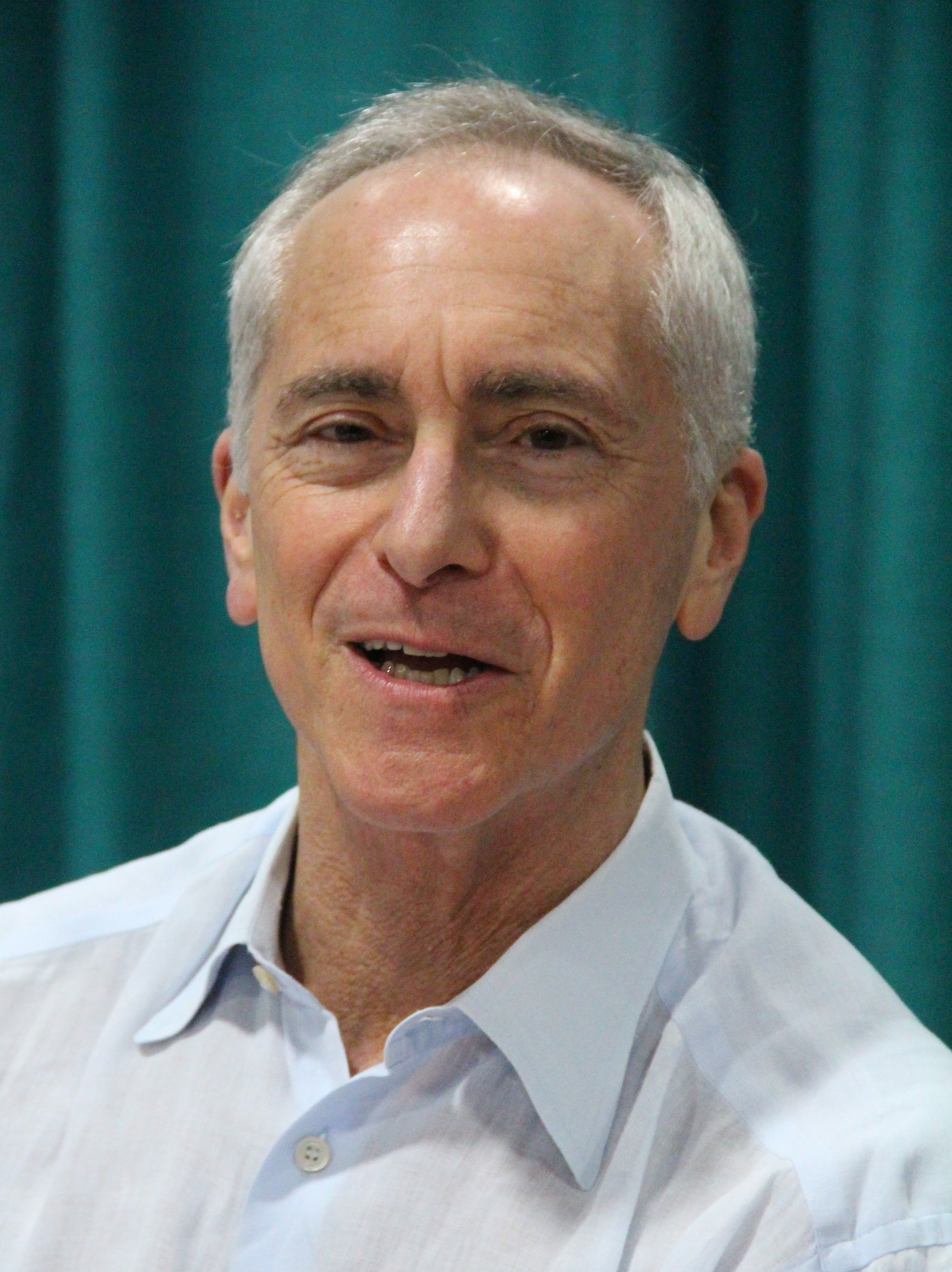
- Berg at the 2015 National Book Festival
- Born: Andrew Scott Berg; December 4, 1949 (age 76); Norwalk, Connecticut, U.S.
- Education: Palisades Charter High School; Princeton University
- Occupations: Biographer, journalist
- Partner: Kevin McCormick
- Writing career
- Period: 1978–present
- Notable works: Lindbergh (1998); Kate Remembered (2003)
- Notable awards: National Book Award; 1980; Pulitzer Prize; 1999

Andrew Scott Berg (born December 4, 1949) is an American biographer. After graduating from Princeton University in 1971, Berg expanded his senior thesis on editor Maxwell Perkins into a full-length biography, Max Perkins: Editor of Genius (1978), which won a National Book Award. (Note: This was the 1980 award for paperback Biography. From 1980 to 1983 in National Book Award history there were dual hardcover and paperback awards in most categories, and multiple nonfiction subcategories. Most of the paperback award-winners were reprints, including this one.) His second book Goldwyn: A Biography was published in 1989.

Berg's third book Lindbergh, a highly anticipated biography of aviator Charles Lindbergh was published in 1998, becoming a New York Times Best Seller, and winning the 1999 Pulitzer Prize for Biography or Autobiography. In 2003 Berg published Kate Remembered, a biography-cum-memoir about his friendship with actress Katharine Hepburn that received mixed reviews. His biography of Woodrow Wilson was published in 2013.

Berg also wrote the story for Making Love (1982), a controversial film that was the first major studio drama to address the subjects of gay love, closeted marriages, and coming out. He has contributed articles to magazines such as Architectural Digest and Vanity Fair.

== Early life ==
Andrew Scott Berg was born on December 4, 1949, in Norwalk, Connecticut, the son of Barbara (Freedman) Berg and film producer Dick Berg. He was raised Jewish. When Berg was eight, his family relocated to Los Angeles, California. While a sophomore at Palisades High School, Berg researched the author F. Scott Fitzgerald (a favorite of Barbara's, who named her son in part after Fitzgerald) for a report and "developed a mania" for his writing. Berg read all of Fitzgerald's works and later recalled: "It was the first time I saw the fusion of an artist and his life, a tragic and romantic life."

He applied to Princeton University, primarily because it was Fitzgerald's alma mater, and was accepted in 1967. At Princeton, Berg performed in the Princeton Triangle Club theater troupe and considered dropping out to become an actor, though he was convinced by English professor Carlos Baker, a well-regarded biographer of Ernest Hemingway, to "graduate, so at least you'll be an actor with a college degree". Berg studied under Baker, who offered him "constant encouragement and counsel" on his senior thesis, which was a study of editor Maxwell Perkins's career between 1919 and 1929. Berg graduated with an A.B. in English from Princeton in 1971 after completing his 262-page-long senior thesis titled "Three to Get Ready."

== Career ==
=== 1971–1998 ===
After graduating from Princeton in 1971, Berg decided to expand the thesis into a full-length biography, thinking it would take around nine months. He also formulated a career plan at this time, and later recalled: "I did tell myself early on: I think it would be interesting, perhaps, to spend a career writing a half-dozen biographies of twentieth-century American cultural figures—each one, as I often use as my metaphor, a different wedge of the great apple pie." The Perkins biography, Max Perkins: Editor of Genius, took longer than Berg anticipated and was eventually published in 1978, winning a National Book Award in Biography. In 2016, The New Yorker credited Berg with "almost single-handedly rescu[ing] Maxwell Perkins from the anonymity he desired."

When I was about 22, I had an idea that I was going to write a series of biographies of 20th Century American cultural figures and each one was gonna be from a different part of the country and each one was gonna be from a different slice of the apple pie.

In 1978, Berg was approached by Samuel Goldwyn Jr. to write a biography of his father, the independent film producer Samuel Goldwyn. Berg initially turned the project down, telling Goldwyn that "he was interested in American culture, not Hollywood," but changed his mind after visiting Goldwyn's archives and discovering gin rummy I.O.U.s, menus from Goldwyn's dinner parties, and "all the quotidian minutiae that are a biographer's dream". He won a 1982 Guggenheim Fellowship, which helped finance his work on the biography. The same year, Berg wrote the story for Making Love, a controversial film that was the first major studio drama to address the subjects of homosexual love, closeted marriages, and coming out. He also narrated Directed by William Wyler, a 1986 documentary about the filmmaker William Wyler for which Berg interviewed Wyler, Bette Davis, Audrey Hepburn, Laurence Olivier, and Barbra Streisand, among others. In 1989, Berg published Goldwyn: A Biography, his second biography.

After completing Goldwyn in 1989, Berg began the search for his next subject, who he wanted to be "another great American cultural figure but — because I had written about Perkins and Goldwyn — not somebody from the worlds of publishing or film". After briefly considering Tennessee Williams, Berg decided to research the aviator Charles Lindbergh, attracted by what he described as "the dramatic possibilities of the story of the great hero who became a great victim and a great villain". Berg convinced Lindbergh's widow, Anne Morrow Lindbergh, to grant him unprecedented access to the man's archives, which he was surprised to find totaled "1,300 boxes, or several million papers".

The biography, Lindbergh, was highly anticipated; prior to its publication, the book's film rights were bought, sight unseen, by Steven Spielberg, who planned to direct a movie of it. Published in 1998, Lindbergh sold about 250,000 copies in hardcover, and won the Pulitzer Prize for Biography or Autobiography. Berg was noted for his exhaustive research, as well as his sympathetic, but by no means uncritical, approach to Lindbergh, whose alleged anti-Semitism he addressed in a straightforward, unblinking manner. Five years after Berg's book was published, it was revealed that Lindbergh had lived a double life, with three mistresses and secret children in Germany. Berg was stumped, reported The New York Times: "'It is just not like him, at least as he appeared to me,' Mr. Berg said. 'But maybe he had entered a new phase of his life. I've long been of a mind that anything is possible with Charles Lindbergh.'"

=== 1998–present ===
From 1998 to 2000, Berg wrote Kate Remembered, a biography-cum-memoir detailing his 20-year friendship with the Hollywood actress Katharine Hepburn. The book was published on July 11, 2003, only 12 days after Hepburn's death. It spent 11 weeks on the New York Times Nonfiction Best Seller list, but received uneasy critical response. In The New York Times, Robert Gottlieb called it an "odd and unsettling book [that leaves] a sense of exploitation", and gossip columnist Liz Smith, a friend of Hepburn's, called Berg "vain and narcissistic", and declared the book "[s]elf-promoting fakery....Hepburn would have despised it and his betrayal of her friendship." Berg responded in a written statement, saying that he was "truly shocked at Liz Smith's professional behaviour — or, more accurately, her lack thereof" in "her personal assault on my reputation, one that stops just short of character assassination".

In 1999, Berg received the Golden Plate Award of the American Academy of Achievement.

Berg served on Princeton University's board of trustees from 1999 to 2003. In 2000, he began researching a biography of Woodrow Wilson, of whom Berg says, "I have an image of him in my mind that is unlike any picture I have seen anywhere else, based on material at Princeton and 35 years of researching and thinking about him". Wilson was published on September 10, 2013.

In the 2010s, Berg began working increasingly in film and television. He worked for Warner Bros. on an unrealized film adaptation of his favorite childhood television series, 77 Sunset Strip, and served as an executive producer of Genius, the 2016 film adaptation of his Maxwell Perkins biography. Berg was also a consulting producer on the 2017 Amazon series The Last Tycoon.

In 2017, Berg announced that he was researching a biography of Thurgood Marshall, explaining that a definitive biography had not been written and that the project would allow him to explore the subject of race, "the most important topic this country must grapple with in the next few decades".

== Personal life ==
Berg lives with his partner Kevin McCormick, a film producer, in Los Angeles. His brothers are Jeff Berg, former CEO of International Creative Management, a leading Hollywood talent and literary agency; and music producer and musician Tony Berg. His youngest brother Rick is a partner and manager at the production company Code Entertainment. His niece is Z Berg, a musician of The Like and JJAMZ.

== Bibliography ==
- Max Perkins: Editor of Genius (1978)
- Goldwyn: A Biography (1989)
- Lindbergh (1998)
- Kate Remembered (2003)
- Wilson (2013)
- World War I and America: Told by the Americans Who Lived It (editor, 2017)
