= Richard E. Snyder =

American publishing executive (1933–2023)

Richard Elliot Snyder (April 6, 1933 – June 6, 2023) was an American publishing executive best known for his tenures at Simon & Schuster and Western Publishing.

== Biography ==
Richard Elliot Snyder was born in Brooklyn on April 6, 1933. He graduated from Tufts University in 1955 and served in the United States Army, receiving an honorable discharge in 1956. He began as a trainee at Doubleday & Co., rising to assistant marketing director in 1958. Snyder began working at Simon & Schuster in 1960, serving as president from 1975 to 1986, CEO from 1978 to 1994, and chairman from 1986 to 1994. From 1975 to 1994, Simon & Schuster went from US$40 million to US$2 billion in annual revenue and became the largest book publisher in the world, home to notable authors including Bob Woodward, Graham Greene, Larry McMurtry, Mary Higgins Clark, Philip Roth, Joan Didion, Joseph Heller, Ian McEwen, Mario Puzo, Stephen Ambrose, Thomas Keneally, Walter Isaacson, and David McCullough. The trade division won nine Pulitzer Prizes in a row during his tenure.

After being abruptly dismissed by Viacom president Frank Biondi Jr. in 1994, Snyder formed an investment group to acquire control of Western Publishing, publishers of the Golden Books series of children's books. That deal was completed in 1996, and the company was renamed Golden Books Family Entertainment. By 1998, shares of Golden Books lost 98 percent of their value. The company filed for bankruptcy protection in early 1999, emerged in January 2000 and entered bankruptcy once again in 2001. The company was purchased by Random House and Classic Media following the 2001 bankruptcy.

The Richard E. Snyder President's Lecture Series at Tufts was endowed by him in 2004. Snyder was a Trustee of the New York-Presbyterian Hospital.

In 2007, Snyder sued Edgar Bronfman Jr. over an alleged oral joint venture between the two involving the acquisition of Warner Music Group. Judge Bernard J. Fried of the New York State Supreme Court dismissed 4 of the 6 charges in 2008, allowing the rest to go forward.

At the request of Norman Mailer, Snyder was a major component in the resurrection of International PEN, an international literary organization. He also cofounded and chaired the National Book Awards and ran them for over 10 years. Snyder was also a member of the National Book Foundation and the Association of American Publishers.

The Richard E. Snyder President's Lecture Series at Tufts University was endowed by him in 2004 to invigorate the intellectual environment on campus by providing a forum for the presentation of provocative points of view on matters of global importance. Notable speakers have included Bob Woodward and Niall Ferguson. Snyder was a Trustee of New York-Presbyterian Hospital and a member of the Council on Foreign Relations.

=== Personal life and death ===
Snyder had four children. His high-profile divorce from second wife Joni Evans made headlines in 1990.

Snyder died of heart failure at his Los Angeles home on June 6, 2023. He was 90.

== Bibliography ==
- Korda, Michael (1999). Another Life: A Memoir. Random House. pp. 158–171. ISBN 0-679-45659-7.
