= Joni Evans =

American book publisher

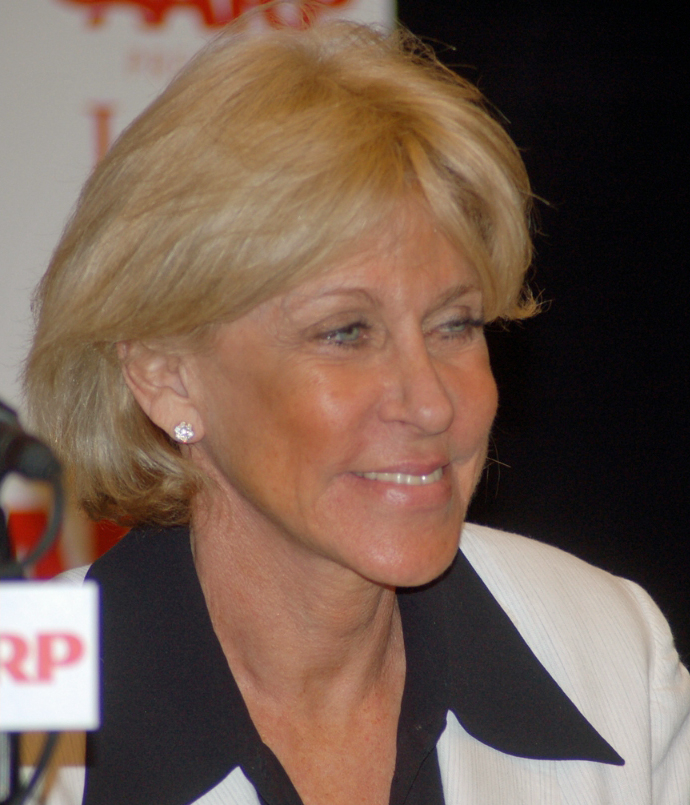
- Evans in September 2011
- Born: April 20, 1942 (age 84)
- Education: University of Pittsburgh
- Occupation: Publisher
- Spouse: Richard E. Snyder (divorced)
- Partner: Bob Perkins

Joni Evans (born April 20, 1942) is an American book publisher of over 100 bestsellers, writer, editor, and literary agent. Evans's background and career in publishing includes posts as senior vice president of the William Morris Agency (1994-2006), president and Publisher of Simon & Schuster (1977-1989), and publisher at Random House (1989-1994).

== Early life and education ==
Evans grew up in Larchmont, New York. She graduated from the University of Pittsburgh with a BA in creative writing.

== Career ==
From 1989 to 1994, Evans was executive vice president at Random House, Adult Trade Division and also publisher of Turtle Bay Books, a division of Random House. Previously, she had worked at Simon and Schuster for 14 years where she served as subsidiary rights director, associate publisher, then as editor-in-chief of her own division, the Linden Press, and finally as president and publisher of Simon and Schuster. Michael Korda in his memoir describes Evans and with her the rise of the importance of publishing rights in the mid-1970s as well as her eventual partnership with Richard E. Snyder.

From 1994 to 2007, Evans was a vice-president at the William Morris agency. Evans represented a wide array of authors, including Marcus Buckingham, Christopher Byron, Ann Coulter, Fannie Flagg, Martin Garbus, Peggy Noonan, James Patterson, Liz Smith, John Stossel and Michael Weisskopf.

Before that she worked as an editor at William Morrow Publishers, the Book of the Month Club, and for various women's magazines.

Evans was part of a 2003 Penn & Teller's Bullshit! episode, which showed "a nice expose of Rosemary Altea during a taped readings arranged by Showtime. Viewers got a clear picture of how she worked the small group of people present for readings prior to the taping in order to glean information for later use. They also learned how her publicist, Joni Evans, seeded the group with people whose biographies were already known to Altea in order to boost her on-camera success."

Joni Evans is one of the founding members and CEO of wowOwow.com. Evans founded the site in 2008 along with Liz Smith, Lesley Stahl, Mary Wells Lawrence and Peggy Noonan.

Michael Korda wrote that Joni Evans played an important part in opening up major executive jobs to women in the book industry as well as making editors and publishers more "conscious of the need to think about the markets for a book."

== Personal life ==
Evans was married to Simon & Schuster head Richard E. Snyder. Their high-profile divorce made headlines in 1990.
