= Liz Smith (journalist) =

American writer (1923–2017)

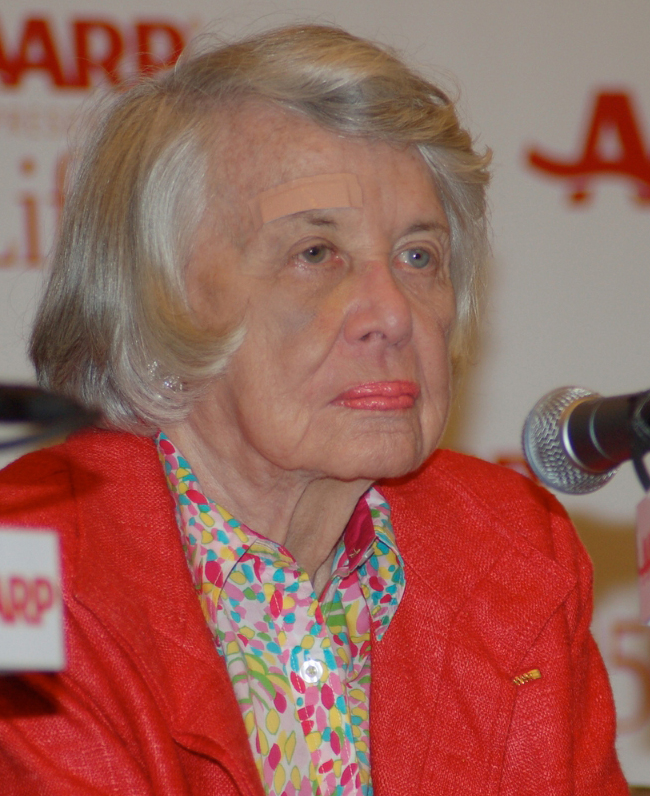
- Smith in September 2011
- Born: Mary Elizabeth Smith; February 2, 1923; Fort Worth, Texas, U.S.
- Died: November 12, 2017 (aged 94); New York City, U.S.
- Other name: The Grand Dame of Dish
- Education: University of Texas, Austin (BA)
- Spouses: George Beeman (m. 1945; div. 1947); Fred Lister (m. 1957; div. 1962)
- Partner: Iris Love (separated)

Mary Elizabeth Smith (February 2, 1923 – November 12, 2017) was an American gossip columnist. She was known as "The Grand Dame of Dish". Beginning her career in radio in the 1950s, for a time she also anonymously wrote the "Cholly Knickerbocker" gossip column for the Hearst newspapers. In the 1960s and early 1970s, she was the entertainment editor for the magazines Cosmopolitan and Sports Illustrated. Between 1976 and 2009, she wrote a self-titled gossip column for newspapers including New York Newsday, the New York Daily News and the New York Post that was syndicated in 60 to 70 other newspapers. On television, she appeared on Fox, E!, and WNBC.

== Early life ==
Smith was born on February 2, 1923, in Fort Worth, Texas. She graduated from the University of Texas at Austin with a degree in journalism in 1949, and she worked for The Daily Texan and The Texas Ranger.

== Career ==
Smith later moved to New York City, where she worked as a typist, proofreader, and reporter before she broke into the media world as a news producer for Mike Wallace at CBS Radio. She spent five years as a news producer for NBC-TV. She also worked for Allen Funt on Candid Camera.

In the late 1950s, Smith worked as a ghostwriter for the "Cholly Knickerbocker" gossip column syndicated in the Hearst newspapers. After leaving that column in the early 1960s, she began working for Helen Gurley Brown as the entertainment editor for the American version of Cosmopolitan, later working simultaneously as Sports Illustrated's entertainment editor as well. Between 1971 and 1976, Smith was one of the ghostwriters behind "The Gossip Column" by Robin Adams Sloan, which was syndicated by King Features.

On February 16, 1976, Smith began a self-titled gossip column for the New York Daily News. During the 1978 New York City newspaper strike, her Daily News editors asked her to appear daily on WNBC-TV's Live at Five, and she stayed with the program for eleven years. Her exposure on television made Smith a regular figure on the Manhattan social scene and provided fodder for her column, which had, by then, been syndicated to nearly seventy newspapers. She won an Emmy for her reporting on Live at Five for WNBC in 1985.

Smith was hired by Fox Broadcasting Company heads Barry Diller and Rupert Murdoch to develop a talk show, with Roger Ailes as her producer.

Smith was once reportedly the highest-paid print journalist in the United States. In 1991, shortly after her exclusive interviews with Ivana Trump at the time of her divorce from real-estate entrepreneur Donald Trump, Smith moved her column to New York Newsday, staying until that paper closed in 1995 and then continuing in both the Long Island Newsday and the New York Post simultaneously. She worked for Fox News for seven years and was last on Fox & Friends. She was the only columnist to ever have her column printed in three major New York City papers at the same time.

In April 2005, Smith left Newsday following a contract dispute. The official discontinuation of her column came after several months of dispute among Smith, her lawyer David Blasband, and Newsday management. The matter was settled out of court and Smith continued at the New York Post and the Staten Island Advance.

On February 24, 2009, the Post announced that the paper would stop running Smith's column effective February 26, 2009, as a cost-cutting measure.

Smith, along with Lesley Stahl, Mary Wells Lawrence, and Joni Evans, was a founding member of wowOwow.com, a website for women to talk culture, politics, and gossip.

Smith was honored as The New Jewish Home's Eight Over Eighty Gala 2016 honoree.

== Personal life ==
Smith married her college sweetheart, World War II bombardier George Edward Beeman, in 1945. She soon left him to enroll at the University of Texas at Austin, where her papers and memorabilia are kept in the Dolph Briscoe Center, and they divorced two years later. In 1957, she married Fred Lister; the couple divorced in 1962.

Smith acknowledged her bisexuality (or as she referred to it, "gender neutrality") in her memoirs. In the December 5, 2000, issue of The Advocate, she told editor-in-chief Judy Wieder that it was not in her nature to be a role model in the LGBT movement. However, she admitted "I think that my relationships with women were always much more emotionally satisfying and comfortable (than with men). And a lot of my relationships with men were more flirtatious and adversarial. I just never felt I was wife material. I always felt that I was a great girlfriend." Beginning in the late 1970s, the archaeologist Iris Love lived with Smith romantically for 15 years.

Smith was a good friend of Texas Governor Ann Richards, and she helped Richards to acculturate to New York City society after leaving Texas. Smith was also good friends with Texan pundit and writer Molly Ivins, also a friend of Richards.

Smith raised millions of dollars for charities, $6 million for Literacy Partners, millions for AMFAR, the New York Landmarks Conservancy, PAL, and the Mayor's Fund to Advance New York City under Mayor Michael Bloomberg.

== Death ==
On November 12, 2017, Smith died at her home in Manhattan of natural causes at age 94.

== Bibliography ==
- Smith, Liz (1978). The Mother Book. Doubleday. ISBN 978-0385124041.
- Smith, Liz (2000). Natural Blonde. Hachette Books. ISBN 978-0786863259.
- Smith, Liz (2013). Dishing: Great Dish – And Dishes – From America's Most Beloved Gossip Columnist. Simon & Schuster. ISBN 978-0743267083.
