= History of the Jews in Los Angeles =

Jews in Los Angeles
יהודים בלוס אנג'לס
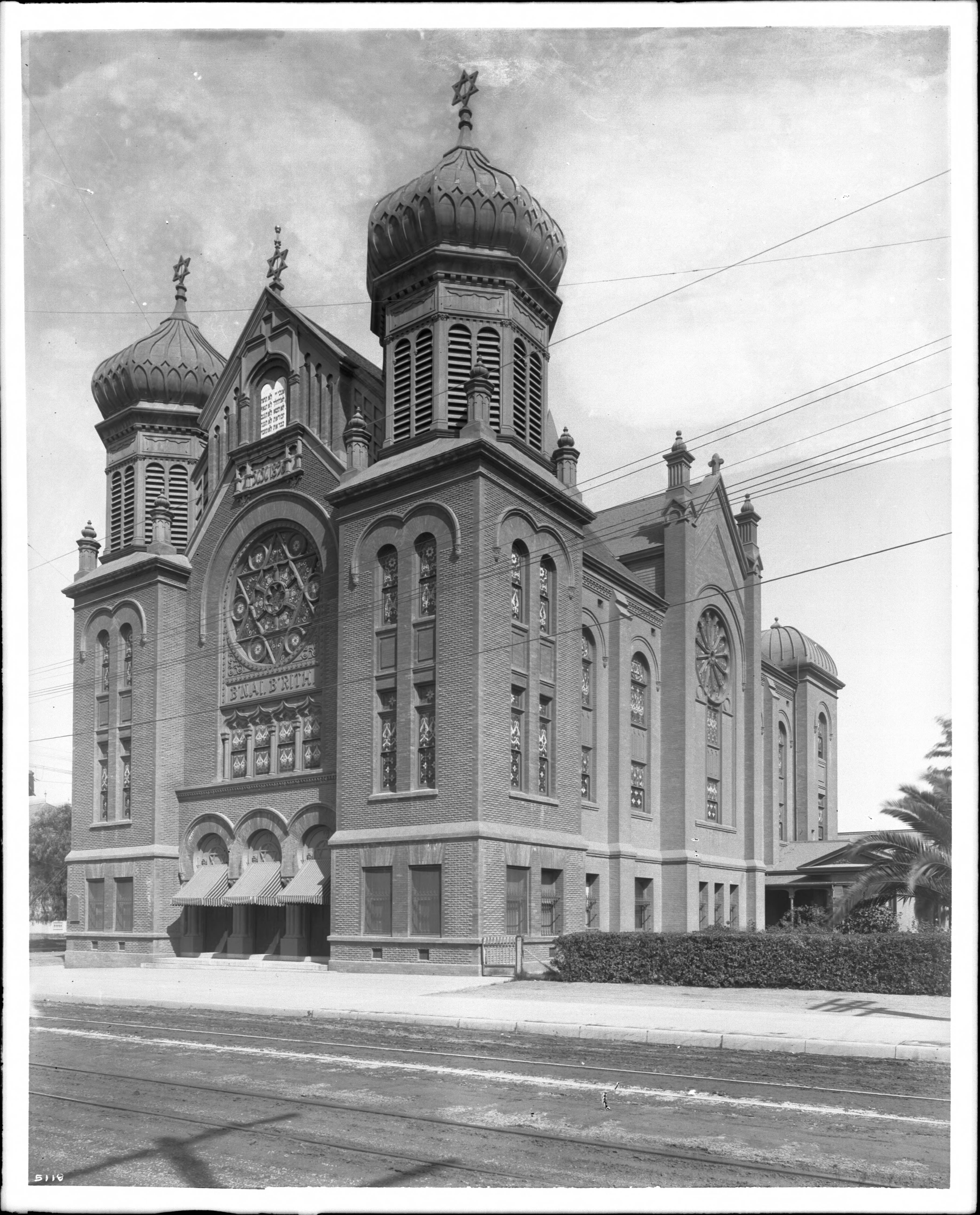
- Congregation B'nai B'rith, the first synagogue established in Los Angeles in 1869 c. 1900

Total population
- 565,000

Languages
- American English, Hebrew, Yiddish, Russian

Religion
- Reform Judaism, Conservative Judaism, Orthodox Judaism, irreligious

Jews in Los Angeles comprise approximately 17.5 percent of the city's population, and 8% of the county's population, making the Jewish community the largest in the world outside of New York City and Israel. As of 2021, around 565,000 Jews live in the County of Los Angeles, and 1.232 million Jews live in California overall. Jews have immigrated to Los Angeles since it was part of the Mexican state of Alta California, but most notably beginning at the end of the 19th century to the present day. The large Jewish population has led to a significant impact on the culture of Los Angeles. The Jewish population of Los Angeles has seen a sharp increase in the past several decades, owing to internal migration of Jews from the East Coast, as well as immigration from Israel, Iran, France, the former Soviet Union, the UK, South Africa, and Latin America, and also due to the high birth rate among the smaller Hasidic and Orthodox communities. In 2021, the largest Jewish denominations in Los Angeles were Reform and Conservative, followed by a smaller Orthodox community.

== Population ==
As of 2021, the Jewish population of Los Angeles is 565,000, based on the "2021 Study of Jewish LA". This marks an increase of 9% in the Jewish population since the previous study was conducted by the Steinhardt Social Research Institute in 1997. The 2021 study estimates that Los Angeles County has the second largest Jewish population in the U.S., second only to New York City. It has the fifth largest Jewish population of any city in the world.

According to the 2021 study, about half of Jewish households in LA include an immigrant to the United States or someone whose parent is an immigrant. The regions of origin include Iran, Israel, Russia/the Former Soviet Union, Latin America, and Europe. Israeli Americans and Latino Jews are generally younger than the general Jewish population in LA. They found that the Jewish engagement of Persian and Israeli-American Jews to be generally stronger than the average local Jewish engagement.

=== Ethnic roots ===
==== Persian Jews ====
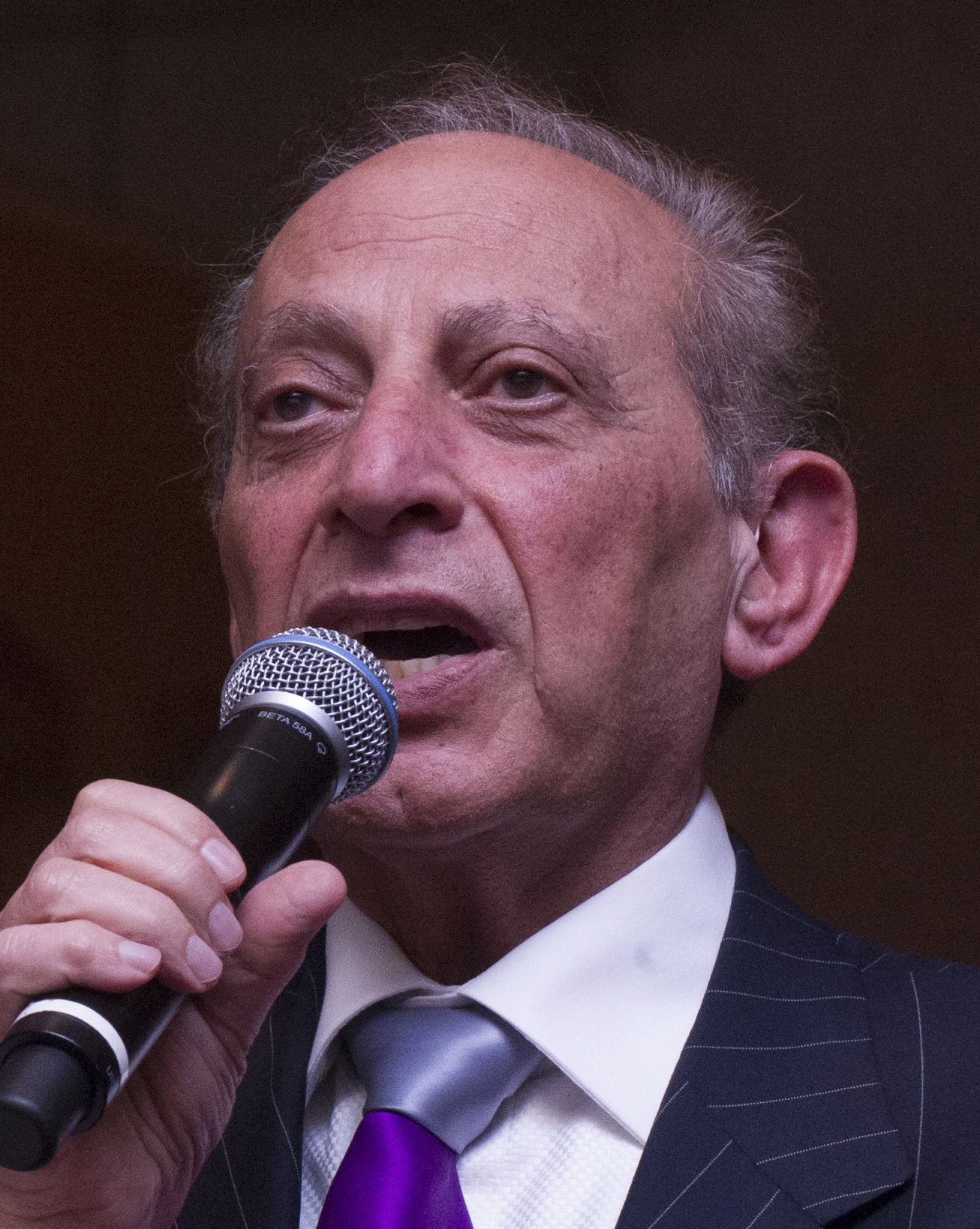
Jimmy Delshad, former mayor of Beverly Hills, and the first Persian Jewish mayor in the United States

As of 2008, the Los Angeles area had the largest Persian Jewish population in the U.S., at 50,000.

The Iranian American Jewish Federation (IAJF) of Los Angeles is a prominent non-profit organization that has been serving the Iranian Jewish community of Greater Los Angeles for the last forty-one years. IAJF is a leading organization in its efforts to fight local and global Antisemitism, protect Iranian Jews domestically and abroad, promote a unified community, participate in social and public affairs, provide financial and psychosocial assistance to those in need through philanthropic activities, and more.

The Beverly Hills Unified School District, the established Jewish community, and security attracted Persian Jews to Beverly Hills, and a commercial area of the city became known as "Tehrangeles" due to Persian ownership of businesses in the Golden Triangle. After the 1979 Iranian Revolution, about 30,000 Iranian Jews settled in Beverly Hills and the surrounding area. The Iranian Jews who lost funds in Iran were able to quickly adapt due to their high level of education, overseas funds, and experience in the business sector. In 1988, 1,300 Iranian Jews settled in Los Angeles.

In 1990 John L. Mitchell of the Los Angeles Times wrote that these Iranian Jews "function as part of a larger Iranian community" but that they also "in many respects[...]form a community of their own" as they "still manage to live their lives nearly surrounded by the culture of their homeland--going to Iranian nightclubs, worshiping at Iranian synagogues, shopping for clothing and jewelry at Iranian businesses." There had been initial tensions with Ashkenazi Jews in the synagogues due to cultural misunderstandings and differences in worship patterns, partly because some Iranian Jews did not understand that they needed to assist in fundraising efforts and pay dues. The tensions subsided by 2009.

==== Israelis ====
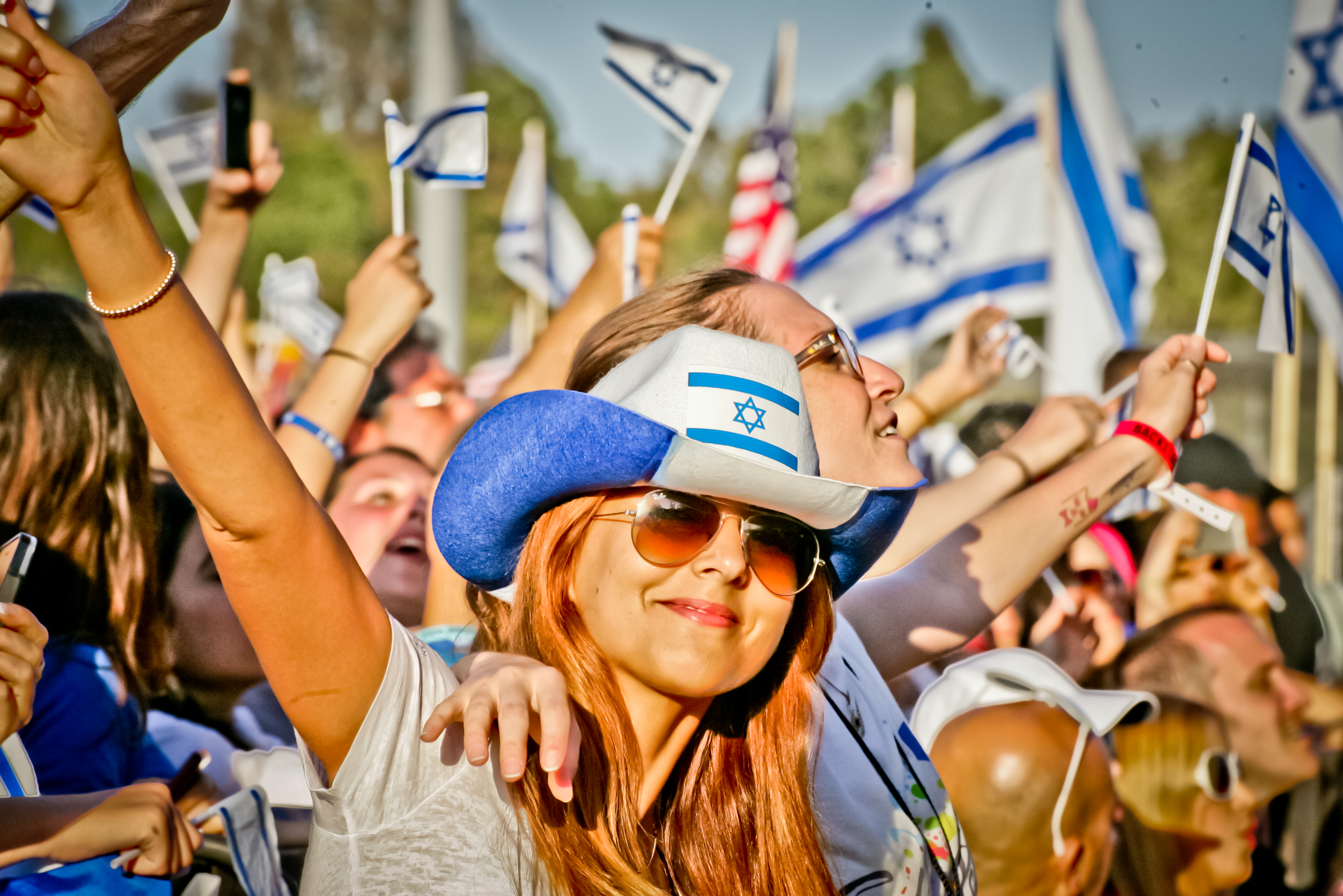
Israeli and other Jewish Americans celebrating Yom Ha'atzmaut at the Celebrate Israel Festival in Cheviot Hills, Los Angeles

Los Angeles is home to the largest population in the Israeli diaspora, with more than 250,000 Israeli Americans living in Los Angeles, according to the Israeli American Council. The Israeli community of Los Angeles is clustered in the San Fernando Valley and Westside of Los Angeles. The communities of Encino and Tarzana in particular are noted for their large Israeli populations. Many Israeli Americans in Los Angeles are first, second, or third-generation Americans and are the descendants of early Israeli immigrants arriving in the 1950s, while others are more recent immigrants who began moving to Los Angeles in a wave of migration that began in the 1970s and continues to this day. The Israeli American community of Los Angeles has risen to prominence in local business, government and culture. Los Angeles is home to the world's first Israeli Community Center (ICC), similar to a JCC, located in the San Fernando Valley.

==== Russian Jews ====
Los Angeles is home to approximately 25,000 Russian-speaking Jews, and has the second-largest population of Russian Jews from the former Soviet Union in the United States, after New York. Russian-speaking Jews in LA comprise 10 to 15 percent of the local Jewish population. They mainly live in West Hollywood.

==== Latino Jews ====
As of 2006, approximately 11,000 Latino Jews were living in Los Angeles, especially in the West Hills area.

==== Moroccan Jews ====
The Moroccan Jewish community in Los Angeles is one of the largest in North America, approximately 10,000 Moroccan Jews reside in the Los Angeles area, mostly in Pico-Robertson, North Hollywood, and Beverly Hills. Many are the descendants of community members who first emigrated to the United States in the aftermath of World War II. Many others came later in the 20th century from Israel, and beginning in the early 21st century from France due to increasing antisemitism there. Most are adherents to Orthodox Judaism, with some belonging to the Haredi, Reform, and Conservative Judaism as well. The community has its own synagogues as well as a community center.

==== Rhodeslis ====
The Los Angeles area has been estimated to be home to 900 Rhodeslis as of 2005. The first members of the Rhodes Jewish community settled in the neighborhood of Ladera Heights beginning in the early 20th century. The Rhodeslis came to Los Angeles fleeing antisemitism and for opportunity. Ladera Heights was the heart of the Rhodesli community for decades. Rhodeslis spoke Ladino at home and established their own synagogue, the Sephardic Hebrew Center; which later merged with Sephardic Temple Tifereth Israel in 1993. Beginning in the 1960s and 70s, the Rhodeslis began to leave Ladera Heights due to redlining and moved to other neighborhoods in the city. Today the Rhodeslis are scattered across LA County and some of them fear assimilation into the broader Los Angeles Jewish community and the loss of their unique culture and traditions. Ladino is still spoken by some members of the community, especially those who are older or are particularly interested in their ethnic history.

Beginning in the middle of the 20th century, the Rhodesli community of Los Angeles started a unique custom that continues to this day, annual trips to Catalina. Every summer several Rhodeslis (40 as of 2005), board the ferry to Catalina Island to embark on a group trip where they can connect with their shared culture and history. An influential member of the community, Aron Hasson once stated to the Jewish Journal, "It was natural to them to take a boat across the water to an island nearby." They visit Catalina Island because its location resembles that of Rhodes in relationship to Turkey.

The Mediterranean island of Rhodes was once the center of an important Sephardic Jewish community with its own unique culture and customs. Jews of Rhodes, who called themselves Rhodeslis, lived peacefully under the Ottoman rule, preserving the medieval form of the Ladino language they took with them following the Inquisition and their expulsion from Spain in 1492. Rhodes was invaded by the Nazis in 1944, and Rhodes Jews were among the many sent off in cattle cars to their deaths in concentration camps. Many of the Rhodeslis who survived the Holocaust and fled World War II and its aftermath immigrated to Los Angeles, because there was an existing Rhodesli community in South Los Angeles, and the area's Mediterranean climate and coastline reminded them of their former home.

==== Yemenite Jews ====
Beginning with the wave of Israeli immigration to Los Angeles which began in the mid-20th century and continues to the present day, several Yemenite Jews from Israel came to Los Angeles and mainly established themselves in the areas of Pico-Robertson, Santa Monica, and Encino; where several restaurants offering Yemenite Jewish cuisine exist. There are several synagogues in the Yemenite tradition, most notably Tifereth Teman on Pico. Many Yemenites also attend synagogues catering to the general Mizrahi Jewish community of the city.

In 1964, several dozen members of the Yemenite community began to meet and pray in the Yemenite dialect of Hebrew in their homes, community rooms, and even a bank basement. For the High Holidays they would rent a room in local synagogues. For the next 18 years, the Yemenites did not have their own synagogue. In the fall of 1986, they purchased a three-bedroom home in a residential area on Hayworth Avenue that they then converted to use as the first Yemenite synagogue in Los Angeles, Tifereth Teman. The move was met with opposition by some of the neighbors, some of whom were Jewish, many of whom were not Jewish and were White; which led to accusations of antisemitism by some members of the synagogue. The synagogue also attracted supporters, mostly within the local Orthodox Jewish community. Some older Orthodox residents of the neighborhood began to attend services at Tifereth Teman out of convenience as it was the closest synagogue to their homes. Opponents of the synagogue filed complaints with the city zoning board as the building was zoned residential. The synagogue was said to have the support of local councilman Zev Yaroslavsky, who later declared himself to be neutral in the face of community opposition. In 1987, Tifereth Teman lost their zoning battle and was ordered to close. This decision was later appealed by the clergy. Tifereth Teman later moved to another building with the proper zoning, where it remains today.

==== South African Jews ====
As of 1986, more than 500 South-African Jews reside in Irvine, in Orange County outside of Los Angeles. Most South African Jews in Los Angeles are Orthodox and go to religious services at an Orthodox synagogue or a Chabad center.

== History ==
The history of Jews in Los Angeles includes significant contributions in the arts and culture, science, education, architecture and politics, and began in 1841, with the arrival of Jacob Frankfort, a German-born tailor, on the Workman-Rowland wagon train.

=== 19th century ===
In 1841 Jacob Frankfort arrived in the Mexican Pueblo de Los Ángeles in Alta California. He was the city's first known Jew. Little is known about the personal details of Frankfort's life, other than that he was a skilled tradesman in high demand. When California was admitted to the Union in 1850, The U.S. Census recorded eight Jews living in Los Angeles.

Morris L. Goodman was the first Jewish Councilman in 1850 when the Pueblo de Los Ángeles Ayuntamento became the Los Angeles Common Council with U.S. statehood. Solomon Lazard, a Los Angeles merchant, served on the council in 1853, and also headed the first Los Angeles Chamber of Commerce. Arnold Jacobi was a council member in 1853–54.

Joseph Newmark, a lay rabbi, began conducting the first informal Sabbath services in Los Angeles in 1854.

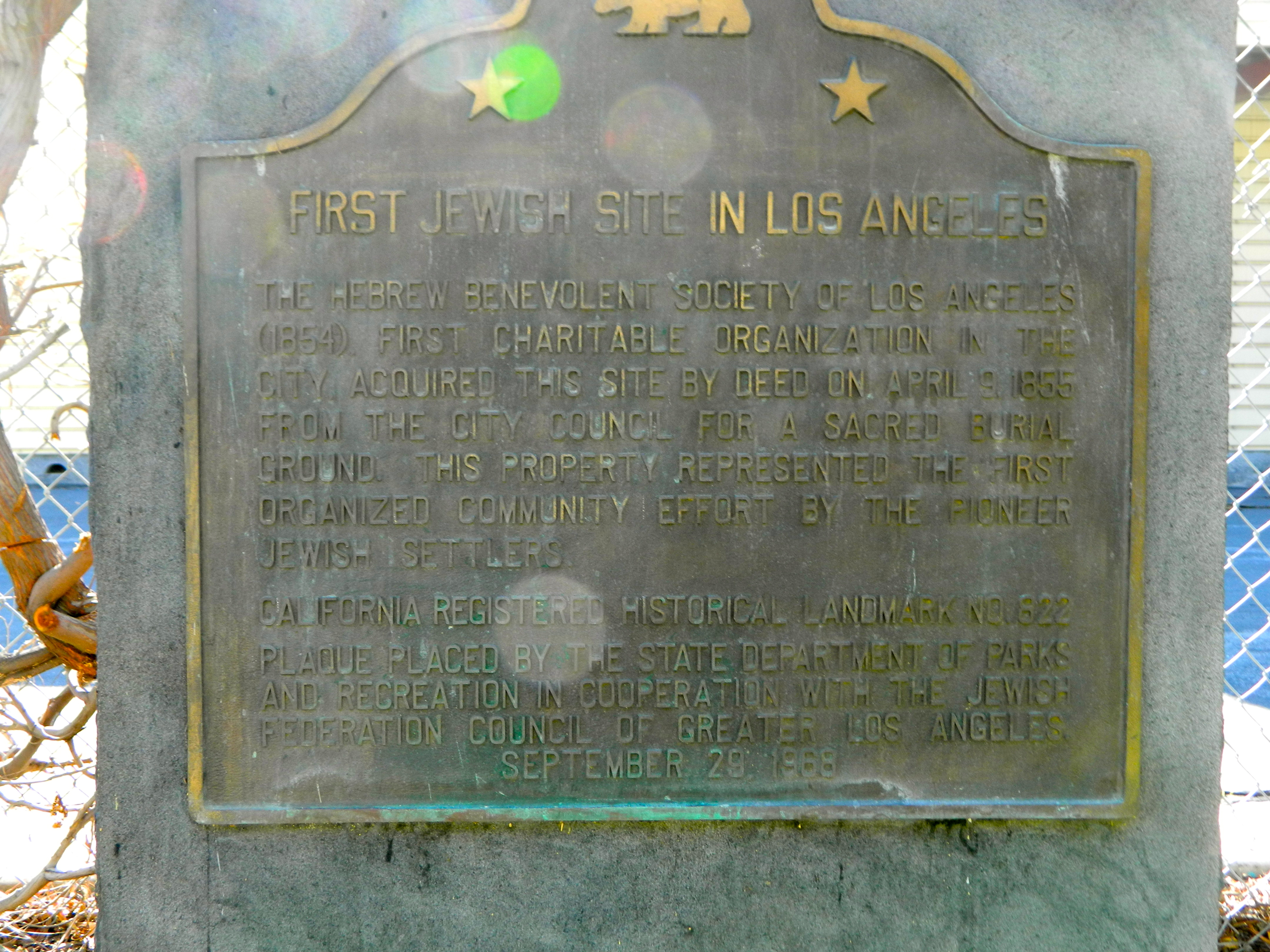
"First Jewish site in Los Angeles" 1855 Hebrew Benevolent Society Cemetery marker.

In 1854, Joseph Newmark arrived in Los Angeles and helped found the Hebrew Benevolent Society for the evolving Jewish community, after organizing congregations in New York and St. Louis. The first organized Jewish community effort in Los Angeles was acquiring a cemetery site from the city in 1855. The Hebrew Benevolent Society Cemetery was located at Lookout Drive and Lilac Terrace, in Chavez Ravine, central Los Angeles. The present-day historical marker for the "First Jewish site in Los Angeles" is located south of Dodger Stadium, behind the police academy, in the Elysian Park area. In 1910 the bodies were moved to the Home of Peace Cemetery in East Los Angeles.

The oldest congregation in Los Angeles started in 1862, a Reform denomination, it is the present-day Wilshire Boulevard Temple congregation.

In 1865, Louis Lewin and Charles Jacoby organized the Pioneer Lot Association which developed an eastern Los Angeles area, later known as Boyle Heights.

In 1868, Isaias W. Hellman (1842–1920) and partners formed the Farmers and Merchants Bank in the city. In 1879, he was on the board of trustees to create the new University of Southern California. In 1881, Hellman was appointed a Regent of the University of California, was reappointed twice, and served until 1918.

=== 20th century ===
From 1900 to 1926 there was no distinct Jewish neighborhood. 2500 Jews lived "downtown" which in 1910 was described as Temple Street (the main Jewish Street) and the area to its south. In 1920, this was described to include Central Avenue. Smaller groups lived in the University, Westlake, and wholesale areas. Except for University, these areas steadily declined between 1900 and 1926.

In 1900, two Jewish community historians stated that "there were far too few Jews to form a definitively Jewish district."

In 1900, there were 2,500 Jews. This increased to 5,795 Jews in 1910, 10,000 in 1917, 43,000 in 1923, and 65,000 in the mid-1920s.

In 1902, the Kaspare Cohn Hospital (1902–1910), which later became Cedars of Lebanon Hospital (Melrose/Vermont), and eventually Cedars-Sinai Medical Center, was established in Angelino Heights. From 1902 to 1905 it treated tuberculosis sufferers from Eastern sweatshops until rich neighbors forced them to stop treating TB patients.

In 1906, the Sinai Temple was organized. It was the first Conservative congregation in Los Angeles and the first Conservative synagogue built west of Chicago. From completion in 1909 to 1925 the congregation worshiped at 12th and Valencia Streets. The congregation moved to Westwood in 1961. In 2013, Craig Taubman purchased the building, which created the not-for-profit Pico Union Project, a multifaith and cultural center. In 1911, the Hebrew Sheltering Association began, eventually becoming the Jewish Home for the Aged, now in Reseda.

In the 1920s, after an initial period in the Northeast and Midwest, a significant number of Jewish immigrants and their families moved to Los Angeles, eventually making Boyle Heights home to the largest Jewish community west of Chicago. The Johnson-Reed Immigration Act of 1924 established annual quotas for immigrants from Europe and sharply limited migration of Southern and Eastern Europeans. However, the population of Jews in Los Angeles continued to increase rapidly as they moved West.

In 1920, the Hillcrest Country Club was opened in the Cheviot Hills neighborhood of Los Angeles as a club for the Jewish community of Los Angeles at a time when they were excluded from other elite social clubs. The club was known for its "Comedian's Round Table", a group of Jewish comedians including Jack Benny, George Burns, George Jessel, the Marx Brothers, and Milton Berle.

In 1925, an Orthodox synagogue, Beth Jacob Congregation was founded in West Adams, Los Angeles. After relocating to Beverly Hills, California, Beth Jacob is now the largest Orthodox synagogue in the Western United States.

In 1927, I.M. Hattem, a Sephardic Jew, opened the first supermarket in America. A self-service grocery store was a fairly new concept at this time, with a variety of products under one roof including meat, produce, bakery, deli, and groceries.

Although the first Sephardic religious congregation, Congregation Avat Shalom, led by Rabbi Abraham Caraco, was founded in 1912, and held religious services in members' homes, the first Sephardic synagogue in Los Angeles was only dedicated twenty years later, in 1932, and is now known as the Sephardic Temple Tifereth Israel.

Jerusalem-born Rabbi Solomon Michael Neches (1891-1954) was the first rabbi of the synagogue originally named Congregation Talmud Torah. Rabbi Neches was heavily involved in establishing Kashrut laws in California and Orthodox Jewish education in Los Angeles. In 1930, the "Agudath Eretz Israel of Los Angeles" was established as a unique Zionist-Jewish organization in the American Southwest, with Rabbi Neches serving as president.

In 1935, a mass meeting was held at the Philharmonic Auditorium to protest against the treatment of Jews in Germany. In 1936 the Los Angeles Jewish Community Council was incorporated, the present-day Jewish Federation Council. In 1940 Los Angeles had the seventh largest Jewish population of all the cities in the United States. Large numbers of Jews began to immigrate to Los Angeles after World War II. 2,000 Jews per month settled in Los Angeles in 1946. Almost 300,000 Jews lived in Los Angeles by 1950. Over 400,000 Jews lived in Los Angeles, about 18% of the total population, by the end of the 1950s. By the end of the 1970s, over 500,000 Jews lived in Los Angeles.

In 1989, there had been about 1,500 Soviet Jews who arrived in Los Angeles by December 4 of that year. Los Angeles area authorities anticipated that in the next two months, an additional 850 Soviet Jews were to arrive. In the year 2021 it was estimated that Russian-speaking Jews comprised 10-15 percent of the local Jewish population.

Jews have played a role in creating or developing many Los Angeles business and cultural institutions, including the entertainment, fashion, and real estate industries.

=== 21st century ===
Following the 2013 mayoral election, city councilman Eric Garcetti became the city's first elected Jewish mayor. He had previously served as the council president and was re-elected mayor in 2017.

=== Recent immigration ===
As of 1996, most immigrants from Israel to Los Angeles are Jews who are Hebrew speakers.

=== History of Jews in the entertainment industry ===
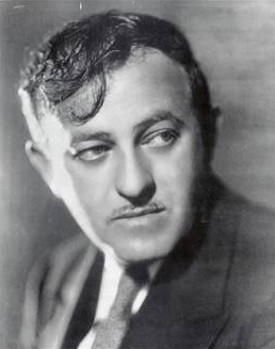
Ben Hecht, one of the first Jewish winners of an Academy Award, winning the inaugural Oscar for Best Story for his 1927 film Underworld.

Jews played a major role in creating the film industry in Hollywood during the first half of the 20th century. Metro-Goldwyn-Mayer, 20th Century Fox, Columbia Pictures, Paramount Pictures, Universal Pictures, and Warner Bros. were all started and led by Jews, almost all of them recent immigrants or children of immigrants from Germany and Eastern Europe. In his book An Empire of Their Own, Neal Gabler wrote that in the movie industry, there "were none of the impediments imposed by loftier professions and more entrenched businesses to keep Jews and other undesirables out." Gabler also argued that because of discrimination in a predominately WASP America due to their Jewishness, "the Jews could simply create new a country--an empire of their own, so to speak ... an America where fathers were strong, families stable, people attractive, resilient, resourceful, and decent." The 20th Century American Dream was to a considerable degree depicted and defined by Hollywood.

Very quickly, Protestants attacked the movie industry as a Jewish conspiracy to undermine "Christian" and "American" morals, especially in a period of large-scale immigration from southern and eastern Europe. Such beliefs in Jewish control, power, and conspiracy are traditional elements of anti-Semitic thinking. The role of these "Hollywood Jews" has been debated for years. Still, one thing is agreed on: most of them avoided identifying themselves as Jews at all, since their major desire was to assimilate and be accepted by the non-Jewish white establishment. Some African Americans, angered by negative images of blacks in movies and by the small number of major black directors and producers from the 1910s to 1960s, raised charges that Jews in Hollywood were both stereotyping and also unfairly excluding blacks. Hollywood leaders responded that there was no conspiracy controlling Hollywood and that Jews in the industry had been leading supporters of liberal causes, including civil rights and the expansion of black participation in the industry.

== Geography ==
Since the late 1960s, Orthodox Jews have increasingly settled Hancock Park. Today, Hancock Park (as well as the adjoining Beverly-La-Brea District) is home to a rapidly expanding Hasidic Jewish population with the majority of the Chassidic Dynasties represented in strong number, in particular Satmar, Bobov, Boyan, Bobov-45, Belz, Chabad, Ger, Karlin-Stolin, Vizhnitz, Munkacz, Spinka, Klausenburg, Skver, and Puppa communities, among others. Additionally, a community of Haredi non-Hasidic Lithuanian Jews (typically called Litvish or Yeshivish) reside in the area along with a smaller number of Modern Orthodox Jews.

As of 1990, the majority of Iranians in Beverly Hills were Jewish. By that year, many Iranian restaurants and businesses were established in a portion of Westwood Boulevard south of Wilshire Boulevard.

Jews have increasingly settled within the city of Los Angeles in the San Fernando Valley and in the Conejo Valley city of Thousand Oaks.

When Jews settled in Los Angeles, they were originally located in the Downtown area. Industrial expansion in the Downtown area pushed Jews to Eastside Los Angeles, where The Los Angeles Jewish community formed in the years 1910–1920. The Brooklyn Avenue-Boyle Heights area, the Temple Street area, and the Central Avenue area were the settlement points of Jews in that period.

In the 1920s, the population saw Boyle Heights as the heart of the Jewish community. In 1908, Boyle Heights had three Jewish families. In 1920, there were 1,842 Jewish families there. In the mid-1920s, about 33% of all Jews in Los Angeles lived in Boyle Heights. By 1930, almost 10,000 Jewish families lived in Boyle Heights.

Since 1953, every representative of the City Council's 5th District has been Jewish.

By the 1980s, a large number of Jews moved to the Pico-Robertson neighborhood in Los Angeles' Westside. They joined an already established community of German Ashkenazi Jews who settled in the area in the 1910s, and a newer population of Iranian Jews who had fled the revolution. Today, the neighborhood is home to a substantial Jewish community, with over six major Jewish private schools, and over thirty kosher restaurants (including Chinese, Mexican, Israeli, Thai, delis, steakhouses, and more), over twenty synagogues, and five mikvahs.

As of 2020, about 87,000 Jews were estimated to reside in Orange County.

== Demographics ==
According to a 2007 study by Pew Research, the Jewish population of Los Angeles has been said to be the most racially diverse in North America; with 8% being of mixed race and 7% being Hispanic or Latin. In 2007, Jewish students comprised 4% of the student body of the Los Angeles Unified School District. Los Angeles also had the highest percentage of adherents to Reconstructionist Judaism in the nation, who were estimated to number 7% of the local Jewish community.

According to a 2021 study, the largest Jewish denominations in Los Angeles were Reform (25%) and Conservative (15%), with a smaller Orthodox community (6%).

== Politics ==
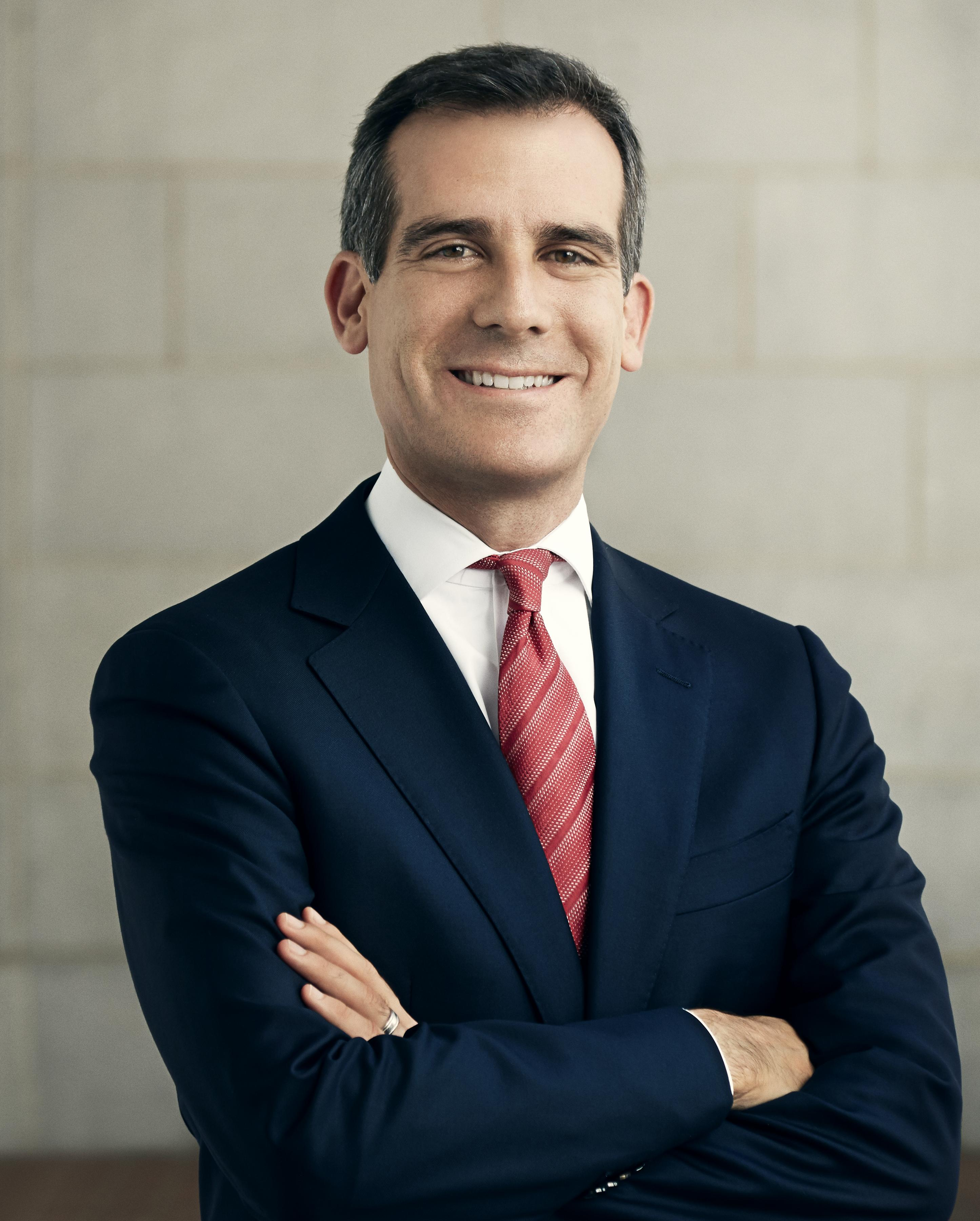
Eric Garcetti, the 42nd elected mayor of Los Angeles is Jewish.

Jewish voters usually vote for politically liberal candidates or causes, but may vote differently to protect their interests/causes. By 2008 Jews made up about 33% of voters in Los Angeles, while in 1993 they made up 25% of voters. Jewish voters in the San Fernando Valley tend to be more politically conservative while those in the Los Angeles Westside tend to be more liberal; Jews in both areas largely support the Democratic Party. Jews vote in favor of immigrants. Raphael J. Sonenshein, in The Role of the Jewish Community in Los Angeles Politics, wrote that the Jewish community had a significant impact on Los Angeles politics even though it is proportionally a small part of the city's population.

=== History ===
In the 1970s, the Westside Jews were in favor of desegregation busing in the Los Angeles Unified School District (LAUSD) while those in the San Fernando Valley opposed it. In previous eras, Jews and Black residents formed a political coalition however, this coalition later declined after Tom Bradley stepped down from his position as Mayor of Los Angeles. That year the Jewish vote was split between mayoral candidates Richard Riordan and Mike Woo. Jews opposed Proposition 187, which passed in 1994. In 1997, 80% of Jews supported the LAUSD school bond, then the largest such bond in history; and 71% of Jews supported Riordan against Tom Hayden. Jews supported Antonio Villaraigosa as Mayor of Los Angeles in the 2001 primary; while he had a slim margin with Westside Jews in the 2001 runoff, the Jewish vote went to James Hahn. However, Villaraigosa received most of the Jewish vote in the 2005 election.

== Media ==
=== Film ===
In more recent times, the role of Jews in Hollywood has become less central, but individual Jews are still leaders in the industry.

=== Television ===
Los Angeles is home to one of only two Jewish television channels, Jewish Life Television which broadcasts worldwide from a studio in Sherman Oaks. In addition to this, JBS a Jewish television channel broadcasting from New York, features weekly Shabbat services from Sinai Temple in Westwood. Both channels are carried by local cable providers.

=== Print ===
The Jewish Journal of Greater Los Angeles is a local Jewish publication that is most noted for its interviews of Jewish celebrities and important figures in the Los Angeles Jewish community; as well as its features in local Jewish culture and events as well as news coverage of events affecting the community as well as other areas of the diaspora and in Israel. Despite being a small publication many notable Jewish celebrities have been interviewed in the journal. Its cultural importance in the community has led to the publication and its reporters being depicted in such films as This Is 40, among others. The Jewish Journal is the largest Jewish publication outside of Israel and is distributed across North America. In September 2020, The Jewish Journal announced the temporary suspension of the print version of the publication due to the economic effects of the ongoing COVID-19 pandemic, transitioning to being an online-only publication for the time being. Many other Jewish magazines, newspapers, journals, and other publications exist in the greater Los Angeles area. These publications are printed in several languages spoken by the local Jewish community including but not limited to English, Yiddish, Hebrew, French, Farsi, Spanish, Ladino, and more. The Jewish Home Los Angeles publishes their own local weekly newspapers for their residents to peruse.

=== Radio ===
Southern California is home to one Jewish radio station. Kol Haneshama is a Jewish radio station, which broadcasts 24 hours a day from the Ateret Israel synagogue in the Pico-Robertson neighborhood of Los Angeles. In addition to Kol Haneshama, some local stations rebroadcast Israeli Army Radio, catering to the large Israeli-American population of the city as well.

== Cuisine ==
When Jews moved to Los Angeles, many of them established delicatessens. By 2013 several delis had closed due to the aging of their customer bases, newly established dining options, and economic issues.

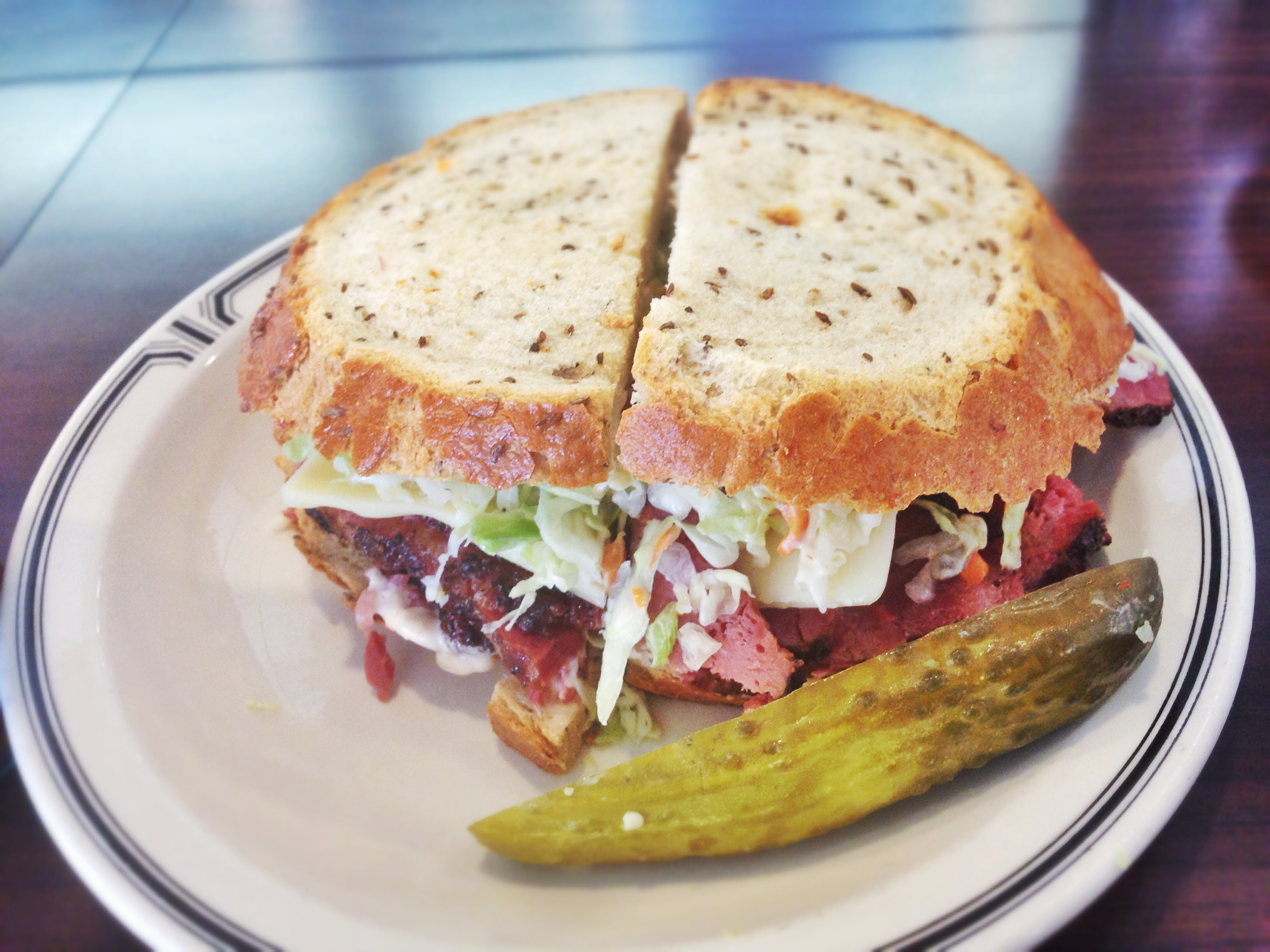
The Number 19 Sandwich from Langer's Deli, consisting of pastrami, coleslaw, Swiss cheese, and Russian dressing served on double-baked Jewish rye bread, and served with a pickle spear

The Jewish cuisine of Los Angeles resembled that of New York until the later 20th century, when more restaurants opened serving Persian Jewish and Israeli cuisine, among others. The influences of these cuisines, as well as Californian cuisine, the organic food movement, and the plentiful local produce have created a new unique Los Angeles Jewish cuisine. There are also a multitude of kosher restaurants throughout Los Angeles serving Jewish, Persian, Israeli, Moroccan, Yemenite, Chinese, Indian, Mexican, Italian and others.

Notable Jewish restaurants in Los Angeles include:

- Canter's Delicatessen
- Langer's Delicatessen
- Nate 'n Al of Beverly Hills
- Wexler's Deli
- Bavel
- The Milky Way, a kosher dairy restaurant in Beverly Grove founded by Leah Adler, and owned by Steven Spielberg
- Western Bagel
- Bibi's Bakery
- Harissa Restaurant and Bakery – Pico-Robertson
- Pizza World, Vegetarian, Mexican and Italian - Pico-Robertson
- Jeff's Gourmet Sausage Factory – Pico-Robertson
- Beverly Hills Kosher Thai

== Education ==
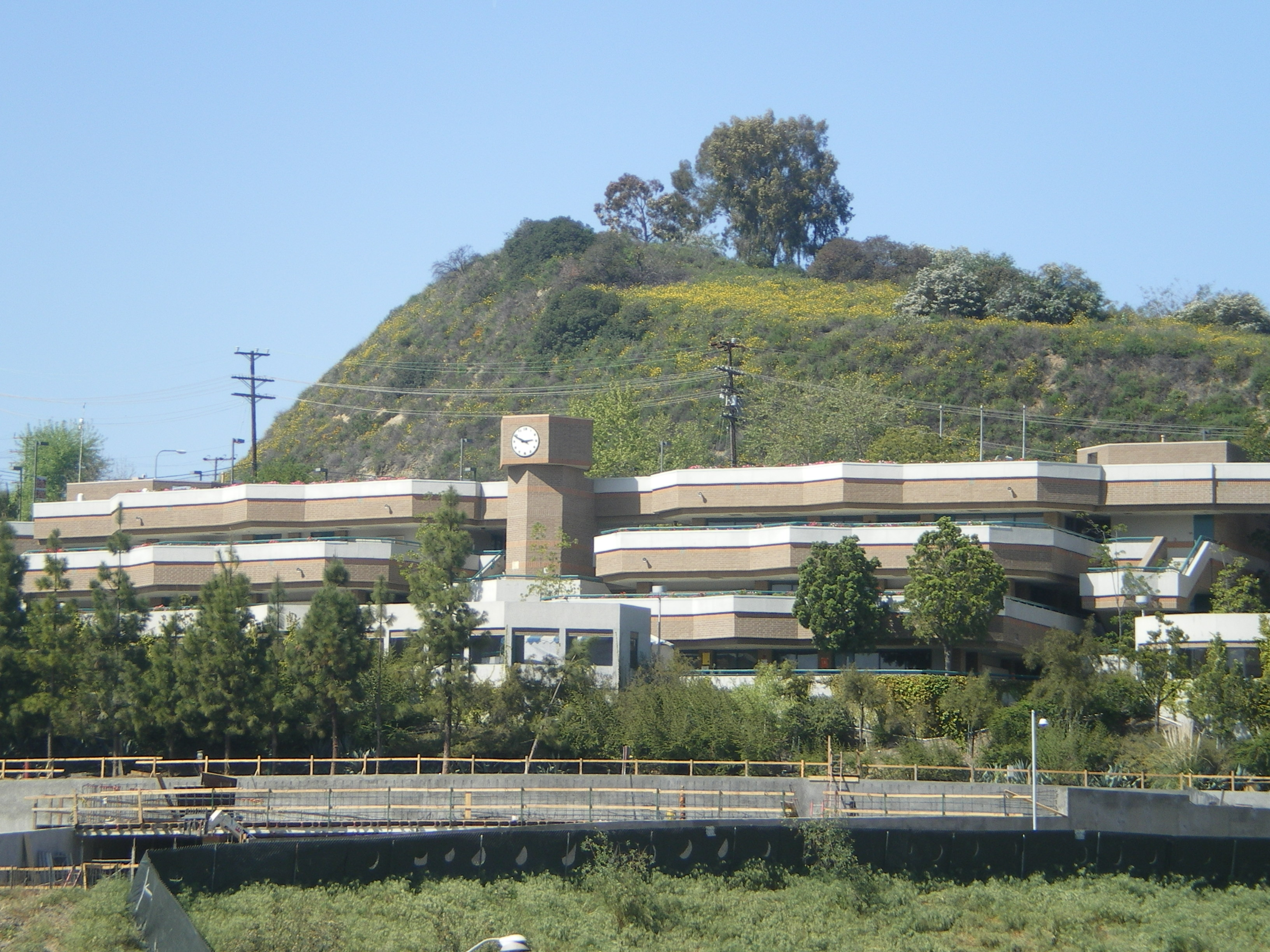
Milken Community High School

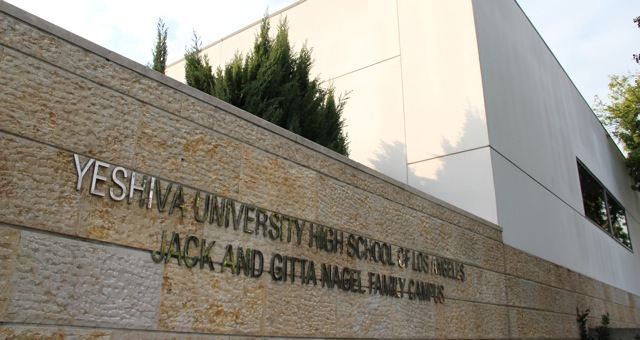
Yeshiva University Boys High School

In 1960-1961, a marginal number of Jewish pupils attended Jewish Day School, with 761 across five Orthodox schools. However, by 2020-21, there were a total of 9592 pupils across 37 Day schools, with Community, Conservative and Reform accounting for over 40% of total enrolment.

Milken Community High School is located in Bel-Air, and is affiliated with Stephen S. Wise Temple, a Reform congregation.

Sinai Akiba Academy is a private elementary school located in Westwood, and is affiliated with Sinai Temple, a Conservative Congregation.

In the Fairfax District, there are several Orthodox Jewish schools. Yeshiva Rav Isacsohn/Toras Emes Academy is a Haredi school with separate buildings for boys and girls grades K-8. Mesivta Los Angeles is a Hasidic Yeshiva that serves as preparation for Kollel. Yeshiva Gedolah of Los Angeles is an all-boys Litvish Haredi Yeshiva also primarily serves as preparation for higher-level Yeshiva study and Kollel. Bais Yaakov of Los Angeles is a Haredi girls-only high school that offers secular studies and college prep in addition to religious studies. Bnos Devorah High School is a very small Hasidic girls-only school. Yavneh Hebrew Academy is a Modern Orthodox K-8 school. Shalhevet High School, is a Modern Orthodox co-ed high school.

There are also several Orthodox Jewish schools in the Pico-Robertson neighborhood. Harkam Hillel Hebrew Academy is a Modern Orthodox K-8 school. Yeshiva University High Schools of Los Angeles is Modern Orthodox and has separate campuses for boys and girls. Mesivta Birkas Yitzchok is a Haredi boys-only high school that aims to offer both Talmud study and secular studies.

Jewish schools in the San Fernando Valley, as of 1988, included Valley Torah High School, Emek Hebrew Academy, Einstein Academy (grades 7-12) in Van Nuys, Abraham Joshua Heschel Day School (K-9) in Northridge, and Kadima Hebrew Academy (PreK-6) in Woodland Hills.

Rohr Jewish Learning Institute in partnership with Chabad is active throughout Los Angeles.

American Jewish University is located in Bel Air, Los Angeles.

== Notable residents ==
- 24kGoldn (rapper)
- J. J. Abrams (filmmaker and showrunner)
- Dianna Agron (actress)
- Jason Alexander (actor)
- Judd Apatow (filmmaker)
- Alan Arkin (actor)
- Irving Azoff (manager, executive)
- Sacha Baron Cohen (comedian, actor, filmmaker)
- Mel Blanc (voice actor known as "The Man of a Thousand Voices")
- Benny Blanco (rapper, music producer, actor, chef)
- Rachel Bloom (screenwriter, actress, showrunner)
- Amir Blumenfeld (comedian)
- Lisa Bonet (actress)
- Alison Brie (actress)
- Max Brooks (author, commentator, and son of Mel Brooks)
- Mel Brooks (filmmaker, actor, comedian, author)
- Lizzy Caplan (actress)
- Mickey Cohen (gangster)
- Emory Cohen (actor)
- Flora Cross (film actress)
- Billy Crystal (comedian)
- Larry David (actor, comedian and television producer)
- Sammy Davis Jr. (actor, member of the Rat Pack)
- Jimmy Delshad (Mayor of Beverly Hills, California)
- Kat Dennings (actress)
- Zvi Dershowitz (Rabbi - Sinai Temple)
- Howard Deutch (filmmaker)
- Zoey Deutch (actress)
- Kirk Douglas (actor)
- Michael Douglas (actor)
- Drake (rapper, actor, television producer)
- Bob Dylan (musician, poet)
- Jakob Dylan (musician, lead vocalist of The Wallflowers)
- Zac Efron (actor)
- Jesse Eisenberg (actor, director, screenwriter, author)
- Doug Emhoff (entertainment lawyer and husband of Vice President Kamala Harris)
- Nora Ephron (writer, author, director and filmmaker)
- Susie Essman (comedian)
- Jon Favreau (writer, actor, filmmaker, chef, former speechwriter for President Barack Obama)
- Beanie Feldstein (actress)
- Mike Feuer (City Attorney of Los Angeles)
- Isla Fisher (actress)
- Gal Gadot (actress and former Miss Israel)
- Ron Galperin (first-openly gay City Controller of Los Angeles)
- Eric Garcetti (Mayor of Los Angeles)
- Jeff Garlin (actor, comedian, star of Curb Your Enthusiasm and The Goldbergs)
- Jackie Goldberg (politician)
- Jake Gyllenhaal (actor)
- Maggie Gyllenhaal (actress)
- Marvin Hier (rabbi)
- Jonah Hill (actor)
- Kidada Jones (actress)
- Rashida Jones (actress and television producer)
- Larry King (TV and radio talk show host presenter)
- Jenji Kohan (TV show producer)
- Zoe Kravitz (actress)
- Nick Kroll (actor, comedian, playwright)
- Norman Lear (showrunner)
- Stan Lee (comic book writer (Marvel Comics), editor, publisher, and producer)
- Dan Levy (actor and comedian)
- Eugene Levy (actor and comedian)
- Jane Levy (actor)
- Jerry Lewis (actor, comedian)
- Richard Lewis (actor, comedian)
- Lil Dicky (rapper, comedian, showrunner)
- Peggy Lipton (actress, star of The Mod Squad)
- Michael Milken (financier)
- Leonard Nimoy (actor and director)
- Daniel Pearl (journalist) - Encino
- Judea Pearl (professor and father of Daniel Pearl)
- Natalie Portman (actress)
- Carl Reiner (actor and filmmaker, and father of Lucas and Rob)
- Lucas Reiner (filmmaker)
- Rob Reiner (actor and filmmaker)
- Shari Redstone (executive)
- Sumner Redstone (executive)
- Melissa Rivers (actress, producer, showrunner)
- Seth Rogen (comedian, filmmaker)
- Phil Rosenthal (producer, television presenter)
- Maya Rudolph (comedienne, actress, filmmaker, former Saturday Night Live cast member)
- Adam Sandler (actor, comedian, musician and author)
- Rebecca Schaeffer (actress and model)
- Adam Schiff (Democratic congressman and senator)
- Robert Shapiro (prominent lawyer and entrepreneur)
- Jeff Shell (executive)
- Shifty Shellshock (rapper)
- Brad Sherman (Democratic congressman)
- Iliza Shlesinger (comedian)
- Pauly Shore (actor and comedian)
- Sarah Silverman (actor and comedian)
- Hillel Slovak (musician and guitarist of Red Hot Chili Peppers)
- Phil Spector (record producer, songwriter, and convicted murderer of actress Lana Clarkson)
- Steven Spielberg (award-winning director, producer and filmmaker)
- Mark Spitz (swimmer and nine-time Olympic gold medalist famously won seven overall medals in 1972)
- Barbra Streisand (award-winning singer, songwriter, actress, director, author, and filmmaker)
- Rebecca Sugar (animator, creator of Steven Universe)
- Henry Waxman (former Democratic congressman)
- Alan E. Willner (professor)
- Zev Yaroslavsky (politician)

== See also ==
- Bibliography of California history
- Bibliography of Los Angeles
- Outline of the history of Los Angeles
- Jewish Community Library of Los Angeles
- To the Golden Cities - A book which discusses the formation of the Los Angeles Jewish community
