= Bibliography of Hollywood =

Below are a list of works related to the history of Hollywood, California.

Works listed here are cited in the notes or bibliographies of scholarly sources. Each is published by an academic or major press, written by a recognized expert, or substantially reviewed in scholarly journals; borderline cases are omitted. A selection of primary sources are included. Many of the books below carry their own bibliographies; see the Further reading section for other bibliographies, and the External links section for historical sites, academic sites, and museums.

Citations follow APA style. (Note: Entries are in plain text APA 7 format without templates; templates are used only for reviews and notes.) Book have citations to academic journal or mainstream published reviews when available. For books only partly about the subject, relevant chapter or section titles are provided when useful and available. Translators of the original-language edition are included when possible. In cases where a title or name has appeared with more than one English spelling, the most recent published form is used and a footnote documents any earlier title under which the work appeared.

== History ==
=== General ===
- Collins, Dana. (2010). Hollywood and the Culture Elite: How the Movies Became American. Columbia University Press.
- Farber, Stephen. (1972). Hollywood on Hollywood. University of California Press.
- Froug, William. (1997). The Screenwriter Looks at the Screenwriter. Silman-James Press.
- Higham, Charles. (1972). Hollywood Cameramen: Sources of Light. Southern Illinois University Press.
- Kobal, John. (1985). People Will Talk. Knopf.
- Leff, Leonard J. (1990). Gossip, The Untrivial Pursuit. Charles Scribner's Sons.
- Nystrom, Christina. (2018). Hollywood's East: Orientalism in Film. Indiana University Press.
- Schickel, Richard. (1991). Intimate Strangers: The Culture of Celebrity. Anchor Books.
- Sklar, Robert. (1994). Movie-Made America: A Cultural History of American Movies. Vintage.
- Thomson, David. (2004). The Whole Equation: A History of Hollywood. Alfred A. Knopf.
- Wood, Michael. (1990). America in the Movies or "Santa Maria, It Had Slipped My Mind". Basic Books.
- Zinoman, Jason. (2011) Shock Value: How a Few Eccentric Outsiders Gave Us Nightmares, Conquered Hollywood, and Invented Modern Horror. Penguin Random House.

=== Classic Hollywood ===
- Balio, Tino. (1993). Hollywood in the New Deal. University of Wisconsin Press.
- Balio, Tino. (1996). United Artists: The Company That Changed the Film Industry. University of Wisconsin Press.
- Balio, Tino. (2008). Grand Design: Hollywood as a Modern Business Enterprise, 1930-1939. University of California Press.
- Basinger, Jeanine. (1991). Silent Stars. Knopf.
- Basinger, Jeanine. (1999). The Star Machine. Knopf.
- Brownlow, Kevin. (1968). The Parade's Gone By. University of California Press.
- Brownlow, Kevin. (1979). Hollywood, the Pioneers. Collins.
- Brownlow, Kevin. (1996). The War, the West, and the Wilderness. Knopf.
- Caddel, Richard. (2002). Hollywood in Crisis: Cinema and American Society, 1929-1939. Routledge.
- Decherney, P. (2005). Hollywood and the culture elite: How the movies became American. Columbia University Press.
- Doherty, Thomas. (2013). Hollywood and Hitler, 1933-1939. Columbia University Press.
- Eames, John Douglas. (1991). The MGM Story: The Complete History of Fifty Roaring Years. Crown Publishers.
- Escoffier, Jeffrey. (2009). Hollywood Renaissance: The Cinema of Democracy in the Era of Ford, Kapra, and Kazan. Columbia University Press.
- Friedwald, Will. (2010). The Warner Bros. Cartoons. Oxford University Press.
- Gabler, Neal. (1988). An Empire of Their Own: How the Jews Invented Hollywood. Crown Publishers.
- Gomery, Douglas. (2005). The Hollywood Studio System: A History. St. Martin's Press.
- Higham, Charles. (1984). Hollywood in the Twenties. A.S. Barnes and Co.
- Hirschhorn, Clive. (1981). The Warner Bros. Story. Crown Publishers.
- Hoberman, J. (2017). An Army of Phantoms: American Movies and the Making of the Cold War. The New Press.
- Kael, Pauline. (1968). Kiss Kiss Bang Bang. Little, Brown and Company.
- Leff, Leonard J., and Jerold L. Simmons. (2001). The Dame in the Kimono: Hollywood, Censorship, and the Production Code from the 1920s to the 1960s. Grove Press.
- May, L. (1980). Screening out the past: The birth of mass culture and the motion picture industry. Oxford University Press.
- May, L. (2000). The big tomorrow: Hollywood and the politics of the American way. University of Chicago Press.
- Schatz, Thomas. (1981). The Genius of the System: Hollywood Filmmaking in the Studio Era. Holt, Rinehart and Winston.
- Schatz, Thomas. (1988). Hollywood Genres: Formulas, Filmmaking, and the Studio System. McGraw-Hill.
- Schatz, Thomas. (2001). The Genius of the System: Hollywood Filmmaking in the Studio Era. Henry Holt and Company.

=== New Hollywood ===
- Biskind, Peter. (1998). Easy Riders, Raging Bulls: How the Sex-Drugs-and-Rock 'N' Roll Generation Saved Hollywood. Simon & Schuster.
- Elsaesser, T., Horwath, A., & King, N. (Eds.). (2004). The Last Great American Picture Show: New Hollywood Cinema in the 1970s. Amsterdam University Press.
- Harris, Mark. (2005). Pictures at a Revolution: Five Movies and the Birth of the New Hollywood. Penguin Press.
- Wood, Robin. (1986). Hollywood from Vietnam to Reagan. Columbia University Press.

=== Modern Hollywood ===
- Biskind, Peter. (2004) Down and Dirty Pictures: Miramax, Sundance, and the Rise of Independent Film. Simon & Schuster.
- King, Geoff. (2001). American Independent Cinema. I.B. Tauris
- Shone, Tom. (2004). Blockbuster: How Hollywood Learned to Stop Worrying and Love the Summer. Simon and Schuster.
- Waxman, Sharon. (2005) Rebels on the Backlot: Six Maverick Directors and How They Conquered the Hollywood Studio System. William Morrow.

== Biographical ==
- Corman, Roger. (1990). How I Made 100 Movies In Hollywood And Never Lost A Dime. Grand Central Publishing.
- Dardis, Tom. (1989). Harold Lloyd: The Man on the Clock. University Press of Kentucky.
- Eyman, Scott. (1997). Lion of Hollywood: The Life and Legend of Louis B. Mayer. Simon & Schuster.
- Eyman, Scott. (2005). Print the Legend: The Life and Times of John Ford. Simon & Schuster.
- Eyman, Scott. (2010). Empire of Dreams: The Epic Life of Cecil B. DeMille. Simon & Schuster.
- Fleming, Charles. (1998). High Concept: Don Simpson and the Hollywood Culture of Excess. Doubleday.
- Gabler, Neal. (2006). Walt Disney: The Triumph of the American Imagination. Vintage.
- Gabler, Neal. (2007). Winchell: Gossip, Power, and the Culture of Celebrity. Vintage.
- Hirsch, Foster. (2010). The Boys from Syracuse: The Shubert Brothers' Story. University Press of Kentucky.
- LoBrutto, Vincent. (1997). Stanley Kubrick: A Biography. Donald I. Fine.
- McBride, Joseph. (1997). Frank Capra: The Catastrophe of Success. Simon & Schuster.
- McBride, Joseph. (2008). Steven Spielberg: A Biography. University Press of Kentucky.
- McGilligan, Patrick. (1991). Backstory: Interviews with Screenwriters of Hollywood's Golden Age. University of California Press.
- McGilligan, Patrick. (2015). George Cukor: A Double Life. St. Martin's Press.
- Neale, Steve. (2000). Genre and Hollywood. Routledge.
- Schickel, Richard. (1968). The Disney Version: The Life, Times, Art and Commerce of Walt Disney. Simon & Schuster
- Schickel, Richard. (1985). D.W. Griffith: An American Life. Simon & Schuster.
- Silet, Charles L. P. (2010). The Films of Josef von Sternberg. McFarland
- Sinyard, Neil. (1986). The Films of Ernst Lubitsch. Cambridge University Press.
- Sklar, Robert. (1994). City Boys: Cagney, Bogart, Garfield. Princeton University Press.
- Spoto, Donald. (1992). The Art of Alfred Hitchcock: Fifty Years of His Motion Pictures. Hopkinson and Blake
- Stenn, David. (1992). Clara Bow: Runnin' Wild. Cooper Square Press.
- Stenn, David. (2001). Bombshell: The Life and Death of Jean Harlow. Cooper Square Press.
- Thomas, Bob. (1988). Thalberg: Life and Legend. G.P. Putnam's Sons.
- Thomas, Tony. (1992). Howard Hawks, the Grey Fox of Hollywood. Grove Press.
- Truffaut, François. (1966). Hitchcock/Truffaut. Éditions Robert Laffont
- Whitfield, Eileen. (1991). Pickford: The Woman Who Made Hollywood. University Press of Kentucky.

== See also ==
- Bibliography of Los Angeles
- Bibliography of California history
- Cinema of the United States
