= Jews in American cinema =

Jews played a prominent and often leading role in much of the historical development of the film industry in the United States.

== The New York period ==
According to a standard work by Huberman and Chandler, "The Lower East Side...was the cradle of the movie industry...The origins of Hollywood were to be found in the new, substantially immigrant mass audience, and its founding fathers among the entrepreneurs of New York's preeminent pre-world War I Jewish neighborhood."

The paradox is that the American film industry, ...was founded and for more than thirty years operated by Eastern European Jews... The ..."studio system"... was supervised by a second generation of Jews. p. 1

== Hollywood ==
As the American film industry moved west, centering on Hollywood in California, Jews were quite involved in the film industry, in all facets, from executives and producers, to creatives like directors, writers, and performers. Even contributing to the development of the studio and star systems.

Many of the men who created Hollywood were Jewish. Adolph Zuckor, one of the three founders of Paramount Pictures, was a Jew from Hungary. Another Jew from Hungary, William Fox, founded Fox Film Corporation. Louis B. Mayer, born in Russia, although he was never quite sure where, co-founded Metro-Goldwyn-Mayer, with another Jew, this one with parents from Austria, Marcus Loew. And Warner Bros. was founded by the brothers Warner: Harry, Albert, Sam, and Jack, three of whom were born in Krasnosielc, Poland (Jack was born in Canada). With David Sarnoff, a Russian Jew who founded RKO, these were the five major studios of Hollywood's Golden Age. In addition, two of the three minor studios of the time, Universal Pictures and Columbia Pictures, were founded and run by Jews. Carl Laemmle, one of the founders of Universal Pictures, was a German Jew from Laupheim in Germany; while Harry and Jack Cohn, along with Joe Brandt were Jews from New York City who founded Columbia.

At the time that Hollywood was developing, antisemitism was widespread in the United States, and due to that, it played a major role in the development of the film industry.

Jews were drawn to the film industry, partly because they were accepted in it. As first and second generation Jewish immigrants attempted to assimilate into American culture, they found many avenues barred to them. The power structures of the country were closed to them, occupied by the "New England-Wall Street-Middle West money". The film industry was not one of them. Roadblocks found in other professions were not present in movies.

== The "Golden Age" of American cinema ==
There is no definitive time frame of when the "Golden Age" in the American film industry began. While some film historians feel that it began with The Birth of a Nation in 1915, the mass production of films really took off in the 1920s and 1930s, two decades when more films were produced than during any other decade. Other sources point to the "Golden Age" as being during the 1930s and 1940s, and some say it continued through the 1950s. The nascent film industry in Hollywood created the studio system, and those studios controlled the entire film process. They owned the contracts of the writers, directors, actors, producers; they controlled the production, distribution, and exhibition of films; they owned the film rights, and all the major cinema chains; and they developed the major advancements in film during this time, like sound films, studio lighting, new cameras and lenses, and, of course, the introduction of color.

During the 1930s and 1940s the rise of Nazism in Europe saw large migrations of Jews, particularly to the United States. Hollywood saw its share of the influx during those years, including talent like Billy Wilder, Hedy Lamarr, Peter Lorre, Paul Henreid, Sam Spiegel, and Vicki Baum, all of whom fled Austria.

However, Jewish studio heads, afraid of the backlash of showing ethnic Jewish characters, shied away from portraying Jews in film. The result was the likes of The Life of Emile Zola and They Won't Forget, two films about Jews which never mention the word, "Jew".

During World War II, Hollywood shied away from discussing the Holocaust in film, with the exception of 1940s The Great Dictator.

== Modern film industry ==
With the burgeoning civil rights movement in the United States, by the late 1950s, more notable Jewish characters began to appear. Some of those included the Morgensterns in Marjorie Morningstar, the heroine of the eponoymous The Diary of Anne Frank, and the main protagonists of two biblical epics: Moses in The Ten Commandments and Judah Ben-Hur in Ben-Hur.

During the 1960s, strong Jewish roles continued, like Rosalind Russell's role in 1961's A Majority of One, and Barbra Streisand's portrayal of Fanny Brice in 1968's Funny Girl. Not only were there strong Jewish characters, but Jewish culture began to be found in non-Jewish characters, such as Yiddish being used by Native Americans in Cat Ballou, and by a black cabbie, portrayed by Godfrey Cambridge in Bye Bye Braverman.

By the 1970s, Jews proliferated in the entertainment industry. In 1979 Time Magazine estimated that about 80 percent of all comedians in the United States were Jewish. Other Jewish entertainers, like Mel Brooks, Carl Reiner, Woody Allen, Gene Wilder, and Neil Simon all began to embrace their Jewish heritage on screen.

Strong Jewish characters continued to be seen on-screen, like the entire community in Fiddler on the Roof, Gene Wilder's character in The Frisco Kid, Richard Dreyfuss in The Apprenticeship of Duddy Kravitz, and the cast of Hester Street.

In his opening monologue for the 2010 Academy Awards, co-host Steve Martin turned to Christoph Waltz and joked, "'And in Inglorious Basterds, Christoph Waltz played a Nazi obsessed with finding Jews. Well, Christoph...' Martin paused, then slowly spread out his arms to embrace the audience—which exploded with laughter, followed by a second explosion when Martin added, with arms still spread wide, '...the Mother Lode!'" The fact that the audience readily responded to the joke bespoke of the general knowledge of the preponderance of Jews in the film industry, as compared to their percentage of the U.S. population as a whole.

When the Academy Museum of Motion Pictures opened in 2021, there was some disappointment that there was no exhibit highlighting the efforts and effects that Jewish people had in creating and building the film industry. After discussions, a permanent exhibition, using the working title of "Hollywoodland", was planned for a 2023 opening.

The academy's Representation and Inclusion Standards have been criticized for excluding Jews as a distinct underrepresented class.

Miranda Cosgrove and Jeff Goldblum are also actors who are of Jewish background.

== Hollywood and antisemitism ==
A landmark film, Gentleman's Agreement, was produced in 1947. It highlighted the antisemitism present in America soon after World War II. In the film a reporter, played by Gregory Peck, decides to write a story on the subject, by posing as a Jew himself to gain first-hand experience. The film won the Academy Award for Best Picture for 1947. This, and other films like it, helped raise public awareness about the subject. Some sources say that the film was pushed by studio head, Darryl Zanuck, after he was refused admission to the Los Angeles Country Club, due to the incorrect assumption that he was Jewish.

While Jewish moguls were in control of their studios, Jewish actors still had to be aware of potential antisemitism. Many changed their ethnic names to sound less Jewish; such as Emanuel Goldenberg aka Edward G. Robinson, Issur Danielovitch Demsky aka Kirk Douglas and Nathan Birnbaum aka George Burns. Others who changed their ethnic-sounding names included Betty Joan Perske (Lauren Bacall) and Bernard Schwarz (Tony Curtis).

By the late 1950s, other films, like The Young Lions began to appear, dealing with antisemitism.

The idea that Jewish people "control" or "dominate" the film industry is a prominent antisemitic trope.

== See also ==
- An Empire of Their Own
- History of the Jews in Los Angeles
- Jewface
- Jews in German cinema

== Bibliography ==
- Eric A. Goldman. The American Jewish Story through Cinema. University of Texas Press, 2013.
- J Horberman and Jeffrey Shandler. Entertaining America: Jews Movies, and Broadcasting. Princeton: Princeton University Press, and New York: The Jewish Museum, 2003. ISBN 978-0-691-11302-9
- Neal Gabler. An Empire of Their Own: How the Jews Invented Hollywood, Anchor, 1988.
