= Carey Orr =

American cartoonist

Carey Cassius Orr
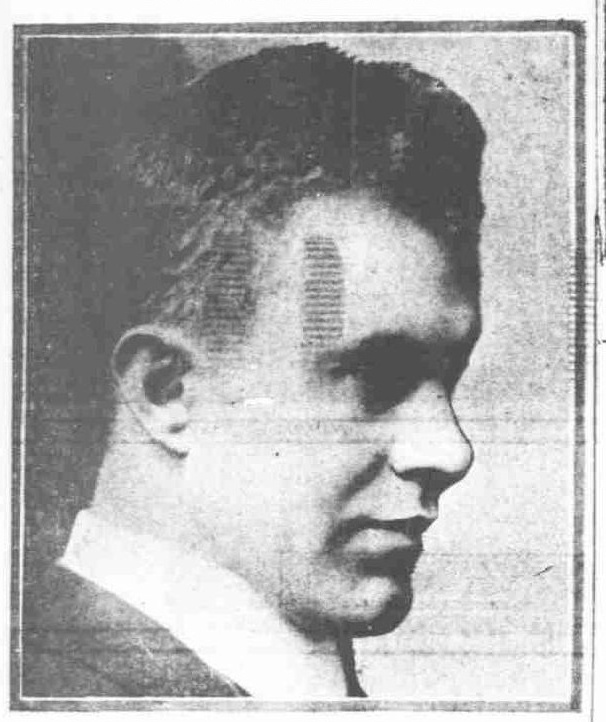
- Born: January 17, 1890; Ada, Ohio, U.S.
- Died: May 16, 1967 (aged 77); Chicago, Illinois, U.S.
- Known for: Cartoons

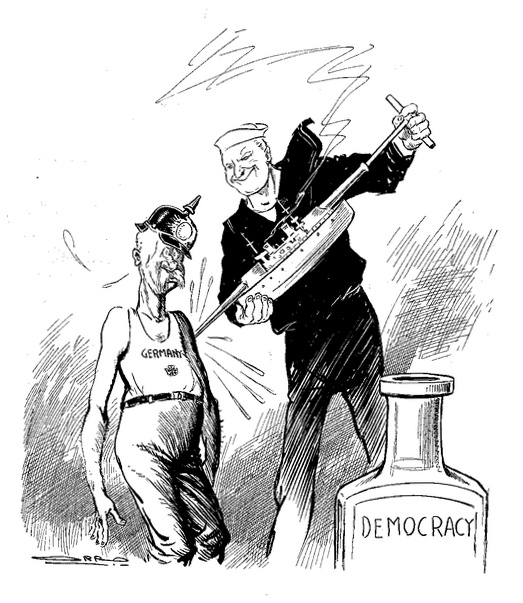
1918 editorial cartoon

Carey Cassius Orr (January 17, 1890 – May 16, 1967) was an American editorial cartoonist.

In his youth, Orr was a semi-professional baseball pitcher, and he used the money he made from baseball to study at the Chicago Academy of Fine Arts. After a $15 a week job at the Chicago Examiner, he was 24 when he began at the Nashville Tennessean as a full-time editorial cartoonist. In 1917, he signed on with the Chicago Tribune, where he stayed for 46 years. He drew the Kernel Cootie comic strip.

On March 25, 1914, he married Cherry Maud Kindel, and they had two daughters. Cartooning ran in the family, as Orr was the uncle of Apple Mary creator Martha Orr, and his grandson is the cartoonist-stockbroker Carey Orr Cook.

Carey Orr met and served as an early role model to Walt Disney when Disney moved back to Chicago. According to Neal Gabler's Walt Disney: The Triumph of the American Imagination, Disney was very impressed by Orr's strip The Tiny Tribune.

== Awards ==
In 1961, he was awarded the Pulitzer Prize for Editorial Cartooning. That same year he was profiled on the television series This Is Your Life (May 21, 1961).

== Archives ==
His papers are held at the Newberry Library and Lake Forest College Library. In 1966, he donated more than 5400 cartoons to the Syracuse University Library's Special Collections Research Center. On June 3, 1966, he wrote:

My 50 years as a political cartoonist has been unique in one respect in that I have always finished the drawing completely without submitting the idea to the editor beforehand. The normal procedure is for the cartoonist to submit two or three rough sketches, one of which the editor may O.K. for completion. This latter method is a great time waster, and causes the artist to depend on the judgement of others with regard to his own work. Eventually the artist loses the ability to distinguish a good idea from a poor one. It is a bad habit to be too dependent on others.

== See also ==
- Mildred Seydell
