= Jews in German cinema =

Jews made significant contributions to the development of the German film industry prior to the rise of Nazism. By 1933, around 20% of German professionals in the film industry were Jewish. Nazi antisemitism, including a ban on Jewish professionals in the film industry and culminating in the Holocaust, caused an exodus from Germany of film professionals, many of whom were Jewish or non-Jews with Jewish family members. Many of the remaining Jewish film professionals who were unable to escape were murdered, including Kurt Gerron, Otto Wallburg, and Paul Morgan. The seizing of German film studios by the Nazis during the 1930s marked the demise of a Golden Age of German cinema marked by innovative filmmaking, including German expressionist cinema and a number of films now regarded as masterpieces. Notable Jews during Germany's Golden Age of Cinema include Hedy Lamarr, Peter Lorre, Billy Wilder, Conrad and Robert Wiene, Fritz Lang, Hans Janowitz, Ernst Lubitsch, Jules Greenbaum, Erich Pommer, Robert Siodmak, and Max Nivelli. Some non-Jews such as Douglas Sirk fled because they had Jewish spouses or children. Some Jewish Holocaust survivors and refugees who returned remained active in West German or East German cinema, including Artur Brauner, Ludwig Berger, Inge Meysel, Hans Jacoby, Hans Oliva-Hagen (father of singer and actress Nina Hagen), and Buddy Elias (a cousin of Anne Frank).

== History ==
=== 20th century ===
The cinema of the Weimar Republic, between 1918 and 1933, is considered to be Germany's Golden Age of Cinema. On March 28, 1933, Joseph Goebbels delivered a speech at the Berlin Hotel Kaiserhof to a crowd of film industry professionals announcing that the film industry would be expected to conform to "volkish contours" and that Jews would be expelled from the film industry. By the next day, executives at the UFA GmbH film studio began hiring Jewish workers and cancelling contracts. The German film industry publication Film-Kurier began publishing articles denouncing "studio Jews". By 1934, so many Jewish directors, producers, and other professionals had been expelled from the industry that UFA's head of production Ernst Hugo Correll complained that the quality of the German film industry had substantially declined.

In 1938, following Kristallnacht, antisemitic legislation banned Jews from attending cinemas. The Jewish Cultural League in Berlin, which had been founded in 1933 after the Nazis came to power, created a Jewish cinema to allow German Jews to watch primarily German and American films in a Jewish communal space. The Jewish movie theater was popular until it was closed by the Nazis in 1941.

German Jewish film professionals who fled Germany often continued to work in the film industry in countries they fled to, including the United States, the United Kingdom, and elsewhere. Approximately 800 German directors, producers, composers, actors, and writers fled to Hollywood, many of them Jewish.

=== 21st century ===
In 2001, the Jewish-themed film Alles auf Zucker! became a hit with German audiences.

== See also ==
- Anti-Jewish legislation in pre-war Nazi Germany
- German expressionist cinema
- Jews in American cinema
- Nazism and cinema
- The Eternal Jew (film)
