= Bibliography of California history =

This is a bibliography of California history. Bibliography contains academic level English language books (including translations) and journal articles, published mainly post World War II. (Note: Works published before World War II should be limited to areas where there is no significant post World War II books on the subject or when the work in question has significant historical merit.)

Works listed here are cited in the notes or bibliographies of scholarly sources. Each is published by an academic or major press, written by a recognized expert, or substantially reviewed in scholarly journals; borderline cases are omitted. A selection of primary sources are included. Many of the books below carry their own bibliographies; see the Further reading section for other bibliographies, and the External links section for historical sites, academic sites, and museums.

Citations follow APA style. (Note: Entries are in plain text APA 7 format without templates; templates are used only for reviews and notes.) Book have citations to academic journal or mainstream published reviews when available. For books only partly about the subject, relevant chapter or section titles are provided when useful and available. Translators of the original-language edition are included when possible. In cases where a title or name has appeared with more than one English spelling, the most recent published form is used and a footnote documents any earlier title under which the work appeared.

== Surveys ==
=== Series ===
Kevin Starr, former professor of History and California State Librarian has written many highly regarded books on the history of California including the multi-volume Americans & the California Dream Series.

- California: A History. New York: Modern Library. (2007). Single Volume History of California.
- Coast of Dreams: California on the Edge, 1990–2003. New York: Knopf. (2004).

Americans & the California Dream Series by Kevin Starr, published by Oxford University Press

- Americans and the California Dream, 1850–1915. (1973)
- Inventing the Dream: California through the Progressive Era. (1985)
- Material Dreams: Southern California through the 1920s. (1990)
- Endangered Dreams: The Great Depression in California. (1996)
- The Dream Endures: California Enters the 1940s. (1997)
- Embattled Dreams: California in War and Peace, 1940–1950. (2003)
- Golden Dreams: California in an Age of Abundance, 1950–1963. (2011)

=== General surveys ===
This section contains general works about the entire history of California or a substantial portion of California history. For thematic gemera; surveys see the section below.

- Bean, W. (1968). California: An interpretive history. McGraw-Hill.
- Deverell, W., & Igler, D. (Eds.). (2008). A companion to California history. Wiley-Blackwell. doi:10.1002/9781444305036
- Faragher, J. M. (2022). California: An American history. Yale University Press.
- Gutiérrez, R. A., & Orsi, R. J. (Eds.). (1998). Contested Eden: California before the Gold Rush. University of California Press.
- McWilliams, C. (1999). California: The great exception. University of California Press. (Original work published 1949)
- Rawls, J. J., & Bean, W. (2012). California: An interpretive history (10th ed.). McGraw-Hill.
- Rice, R. B., Bullough, W. A., Orsi, R. J., Irwin, M. A., Magliari, M. F., & Tsu, C. M. (2019). The elusive Eden: A new history of California (5th ed.). Waveland Press.
- Rolle, A., & Verge, A. C. (2014). California: A history (8th ed.). John Wiley & Sons.
- Starr, K. (2005). California: A history. Modern Library.

=== Survey type thematic works ===
- Broussard, A. S. (2012). Expectations of equality: A history of Black Westerners. Harlan Davidson.
- Cornford, D. (Ed.). (1995). Working people of California. University of California Press.
- Farmer, J. (2013). Trees in paradise: A California history. W. W. Norton.
- Fisher, J. A. (1971). The political development of the Black community in California, 1850–1950. California History, 50(3), 256–266. JSTOR 25157334
- Geschwind, C.-H. (2001). California earthquakes: Science, risk, and the politics of hazard mitigation. Johns Hopkins University Press.
- Glass, F. B. (2016). From mission to microchip: A history of the California labor movement. University of California Press.
- Gutiérrez, D. G. (1995). Walls and mirrors: Mexican Americans, Mexican immigrants, and the politics of ethnicity. University of California Press.
- Heizer, R. F., & Almquist, A. J. (1971). The other Californians: Prejudice and discrimination under Spain, Mexico, and the United States to 1920. University of California Press.
- Liebman, E. (1983). California farmland: A history of large agricultural landholdings. Rowman & Allanheld.
- McEvoy, A. F. (1986). The fisherman's problem: Ecology and law in the California fisheries, 1850–1980. Cambridge University Press.
- Menchaca, M. (1995). The Mexican outsiders: A community history of marginalization and discrimination in California. University of Texas Press.
- Olmstead, A. L., & Rhode, P. W. (2017). A history of California agriculture. Giannini Foundation of Agricultural Economics, University of California.
- Pincetl, S. S. (1999). Transforming California: A political history of land use and development. Johns Hopkins University Press.
- Pyne, S. J. (2016). California: A fire survey. University of Arizona Press.
- Robinson, W. W. (1948). Land in California: The story of mission lands, ranchos, squatters, mining claims, railroad grants, land scrip, homesteads. University of California Press.
- Shipek, F. C. (1988). Pushed into the rocks: Southern California Indian land tenure, 1769–1986. University of Nebraska Press.
- Street, R. S. (2004). Beasts of the field: A narrative history of California farmworkers, 1769–1913. Stanford University Press.
- Taylor, Q. (1998). In search of the racial frontier: African Americans in the American West, 1528–1990. W. W. Norton.
- Walker, R. A. (2004). The conquest of bread: 150 years of agribusiness in California. New Press.
- Wollenberg, C. (1976). All deliberate speed: Segregation and exclusion in California schools, 1855–1975. University of California Press.

=== Regional surveys ===
- Gibson, C. (2019). El Norte: The Epic and Forgotten Story of Hispanic North America. Atlantic Monthly Press.
- Goodwin, R. (2019). América: The Epic Story of Spanish North America, 1493–1898 (Illustrated edition). Bloomsbury Publishing.
- Kessell, J. L. (2002). Spain in the Southwest: A narrative history of colonial New Mexico, Arizona, Texas, and California. University of Oklahoma Press.
- Solnit, R. (2014). Savage Dreams: a Journey into the Hidden Wars of the American West. University of California Press.

== Native and Spanish California (pre 1821) ==
=== Indigenous peoples ===
- Akins, D. B., & Bauer, W. J., Jr. (2021). We are the land: A history of Native California. University of California Press.
- Anderson, M. K. (1999). The fire, pruning, and coppice management of temperate ecosystems for basketry material by California Indian tribes. Human Ecology, 27(1), 79–113. doi:10.1023/A:1018757317568
- Anderson, M. K. (2005). Tending the wild: Native American knowledge and the management of California's natural resources. University of California Press.
- Arkush, B. S. (1993). Yokuts trade networks and native culture change in central and eastern California. Ethnohistory, 40(4). JSTOR 482590
- Bauer, W. J. (2016). California through Native Eyes: Reclaiming History. University of Washington Press.
- Bean, L. J. (Ed.). (1994). The Ohlone past and present: Native Americans of the San Francisco Bay region (Ballena Press Anthropological Papers No. 42). Ballena Press.
- Bean, L. J., & Blackburn, T. C. (Eds.). (1976). Native Californians: A theoretical retrospective. Ballena Press.
- Forbes, J. D. (1969). Native Americans of California and Nevada. Naturegraph Publishers.
- Gamble, L. H. (2008). The Chumash world at European contact: Power, trade, and feasting among complex hunter-gatherers. University of California Press.
- Heizer, R. F. (Ed.). (1978). California (W. C. Sturtevant, Gen. Ed.; Handbook of North American Indians, Vol. 8). Smithsonian Institution.
- Kroeber, A. L. (1925). Handbook of the Indians of California (Bureau of American Ethnology Bulletin 78). Government Printing Office.
- Lightfoot, K. G., & Parrish, O. (2009). California Indians and their environment: An introduction. University of California Press.
- McCawley, W. (1996). The first Angelinos: The Gabrielino Indians of Los Angeles. Malki Museum Press; Ballena Press.
- Sutton, M. Q. (2021). An introduction to Native North America (6th ed.). Routledge.
- Timbrook, J. (1990). Ethnobotany of Chumash Indians, California, based on collections by John P. Harrington. Economic Botany, 44(2), 236–253. doi:10.1007/BF02860489

=== Spanish colonization and the mission system ===
- Archibald, R. (1976). The economy of the Alta California mission, 1803–1821. Southern California Quarterly, 58(2), 227-240. JSTOR 41170653
- Beebe, R. M., & Senkewicz, R. M. (Eds.). (2001). Lands of promise and despair: Chronicles of early California, 1535–1846. Santa Clara University; Heyday Books.
- Bolton, H. E. (1927). Fray Juan Crespí: Missionary explorer on the Pacific coast, 1769–1774. University of California Press.
- Bouvier, V. M. (2001). Women and the conquest of California, 1542–1840: Codes of silence. University of Arizona Press.
- Castillo, E. D. (1994). Gender status decline, resistance, and accommodation among female neophytes in the missions of California: A San Gabriel case study. American Indian Culture and Research Journal, 18(1), 67-93.
- Chapman, C. E. (1921). A history of California: The Spanish period. Macmillan.
- Dartt-Newton, D., & Erlandson, J. M. (2006). Little choice for the Chumash: Colonialism, cattle, and coercion in mission period California. American Indian Quarterly, 30(3), 416-430.
- Garr, D. (1972). Planning, politics and plunder: The missions and Indian pueblos of Hispanic California. Southern California Quarterly, 54(4), 291-312. JSTOR 41170444
- Geiger, M. J. (1969). Franciscan missionaries in Hispanic California, 1769–1848: A biographical dictionary. Huntington Library.
- Gentilcore, R. L. (1961). Missions and mission lands of Alta California. Annals of the Association of American Geographers, 51(1), 46-72. doi:10.1111/j.1467-8306.1961.tb00368.x
- Gordillo Brockmann, B. (2025). Julio César, Luiseño musician: California Indian oral tradition, Franciscan music instruction, and California missions, 1769–1846. Ethnohistory, 72(4), 459-482. doi:10.1215/00141801-11907543
- Guest, F. F. (1996). Hispanic California revisited: Essays (D. B. Nunis Jr., Ed.). Santa Barbara Mission Archive-Library.
- Hackel, S. W. (1997). Land, labor, and production: The colonial economy of Spanish and Mexican California. California History, 76(2-3), 111-146. JSTOR 25161664
- Hackel, S. W. (2005). Children of Coyote, missionaries of Saint Francis: Indian-Spanish relations in colonial California, 1769–1850. University of North Carolina Press.
- Hackel, S. W. (Ed.). (2018). The worlds of Junípero Serra: Historical contexts and cultural representations. University of California Press.
- Hull, K. L. (2009). Pestilence and persistence: Yosemite Indian demography and culture in colonial California. University of California Press.
- Hyslop, S. G. (2012). Contest for California: From Spanish colonization to the American conquest. Arthur H. Clark Company.
- Jackson, R. H. (1994). Indian population decline: The missions of northwestern New Spain, 1687–1840. University of New Mexico Press.
- Jackson, R. H., & Castillo, E. (1995). Indians, Franciscans, and Spanish colonization: The impact of the mission system on California Indians. University of New Mexico Press.
- Johnson, J. R. (1997). The Indians of Mission San Fernando. Southern California Quarterly, 79(3), 249-290. JSTOR 41172612
- Kelsey, H. (1976). A new look at the founding of old Los Angeles. California Historical Quarterly, 55(4), 326–339. JSTOR 25157662
- Kessell, J. L. (2002). Spain in the Southwest: A narrative history of colonial New Mexico, Arizona, Texas, and California. University of Oklahoma Press.
- Kimbro, E. E., Costello, J. G., & Ball, T. (2009). The California missions: History, art, and preservation. Getty Conservation Institute.
- Larson, D. O., Johnson, J. R., & Michaelsen, J. C. (1994). Missionization among the coastal Chumash of central California: A study of risk minimization strategies. American Anthropologist, 96(2), 263–299. doi:10.1525/aa.1994.96.2.02a00020
- Lightfoot, K. G. (2005). Indians, missionaries, and merchants: The legacy of colonial encounters on the California frontiers. University of California Press.
- McCormack, B. T. (2007). Conjugal violence, sex, sin, and murder in the mission communities of Alta California. Journal of the History of Sexuality, 16(3), 391-415.
- Milliken, R. (1995). A time of little choice: The disintegration of tribal culture in the San Francisco Bay Area, 1769–1810. Ballena Press.
- Neuerburg, N. (1997). The Indian Via Crucis from Mission San Fernando: An historical exposition. Southern California Quarterly, 79(3), 329-382. JSTOR 41172615
- Newell, Q. (2005). "The Indians generally love their wives and children": Native American marriage and sexual practices in Missions San Francisco, Santa Clara, and San José. The Catholic Historical Review, 91(1), 60-82. doi:10.1353/cat.2005.0121
- Newell, Q. D. (2009). Constructing lives at Mission San Francisco: Native Californians and Hispanic colonists, 1776–1821. University of New Mexico Press.
- Noe, S. J. (2023). Indigenous foodways as persistence in the Alta California mission system. American Antiquity, 88(4), 451-475. doi:10.1017/aaq.2023.53
- Panich, L. M. (2013). Archaeologies of persistence: Reconsidering the legacies of colonialism in Native North America. American Antiquity, 78(1), 105-122. doi:10.7183/0002-7316.78.1.105
- Panich, L. M. (2020). Narratives of persistence: Indigenous negotiations of colonialism in Alta and Baja California. University of Arizona Press.
- Panich, L. M., & Schneider, T. D. (2015). Expanding mission archaeology: A landscape approach to Indigenous autonomy in colonial California. Journal of Anthropological Archaeology, 40, 48-58. doi:10.1016/j.jaa.2015.05.006
- Panich, L. M., & Schneider, T. D. (Eds.). (2014). Indigenous landscapes and Spanish missions: New perspectives from archaeology and ethnohistory. University of Arizona Press.
- Phillips, G. H. (2010). Vineyards and Vaqueros: Indian Labor and the Economic Expansion of Southern California, 1771–1877 (Illustrated edition). University of Oklahoma Press.
- Sandos, J. A. (2004). Converting California: Indians and Franciscans in the missions. Yale University Press.
- Schneider, T. D. (2021). The archaeology of refuge and recourse: Coast Miwok resilience and Indigenous hinterlands in colonial California. University of Arizona Press.
- Silliman, S. W. (2001). Theoretical perspectives on labor and colonialism: Reconsidering the California missions. Journal of Anthropological Archaeology, 20(4), 379-407. doi:10.1006/jaar.2001.0383
- Skowronek, R. K. (1998). Sifting the evidence: Perceptions of life at the Ohlone (Costanoan) missions of Alta California. Ethnohistory, 45(4), 675–708. JSTOR 483300
- Street, R. S. (1996). First farmworkers, first "braceros": Baja California field hands and the origins of farm labor importation in California agriculture, 1769–1790. California History, 75(4), 306-321. JSTOR 25177614
- Voss, B. L. (2008). The archaeology of ethnogenesis: Race and sexuality in colonial San Francisco. University of California Press.

== Mexican and territorial era (1821-1850) ==
- Beebe, R. M., & Senkewicz, R. M. (Eds. & Trans.). (2006). Testimonios: Early California through the eyes of women, 1815–1848. Heyday Books.
- Chávez-García, M. (2004). Negotiating conquest: Gender and power in California, 1770s to 1880s. University of Arizona Press.
- González, M. J. (2005). This small city will be a Mexican paradise: Exploring the origins of Mexican culture in Los Angeles, 1821–1846. University of New Mexico Press.
- Griswold del Castillo, R. (1995). Neither activists nor victims: Mexican women's historical discourse: The case of San Diego, 1820–1850. California History, 74(3), 230–243. JSTOR 25177508
- Haas, L. (1995). Conquests and historical identities in California, 1769–1936. University of California Press.
- Haas, L. (2014). Saints and citizens: Indigenous histories of colonial missions and Mexican California. University of California Press.
- Hutchinson, C. A. (1965). The Mexican government and the mission Indians of Upper California, 1821–1835. The Americas, 21(4), 335–362. JSTOR 979322
- Monroy, D. (1990). Thrown among strangers: The making of Mexican culture in frontier California. University of California Press.
- Neri, M. C. (1977). Narciso Durán and the secularization of the California missions. The Americas, 33(3), 411–429. JSTOR 980946
- Osio, A. M. (1996). The history of Alta California: A memoir of Mexican California (R. M. Beebe & R. M. Senkewicz, Eds. & Trans.). University of Wisconsin Press.
- Pérez, E. (2018). Colonial intimacies: Interethnic kinship, sexuality, and marriage in Southern California, 1769–1885. University of Oklahoma Press.
- Phillips, G. H. (2010). Vineyards and vaqueros: Indian labor and the economic expansion of Southern California, 1771–1877. Arthur H. Clark Company.
- Pitt, L. (1966). The decline of the Californios: A social history of the Spanish-speaking Californians, 1846–1890. University of California Press.
- Salomon, C. (2007). Secularization in California: Pío Pico at Mission San Luis Rey. Southern California Quarterly, 89(4), 349–371. JSTOR 41172390
- Sánchez, R. (1995). Telling identities: The Californio testimonios. University of Minnesota Press.
- Servín, M. P. (1965). The secularization of the California missions: A reappraisal. Southern California Quarterly, 47(2), 133–149. JSTOR 41169919
- Silliman, S. W. (2004). Lost laborers in colonial California: Native Americans and the archaeology of Rancho Petaluma. University of Arizona Press.

=== Borderlands ===
- Barbour, B. H. (2009). Jedediah Smith: No ordinary mountain man. University of Oklahoma Press.
- Brooks, J. F. (2002). Captives and cousins: Slavery, kinship, and community in the Southwest borderlands. University of North Carolina Press.
- Crosby, H. W. (2015). Californio portraits: Baja California's vanishing culture. University of Oklahoma Press.
- Gibson, C. (2019). El Norte: The epic and forgotten story of Hispanic North America. Atlantic Monthly Press.
- Goodwin, R. (2019). América: The epic story of Spanish North America, 1493–1898. Bloomsbury Publishing.
- Igler, D. (2013). The great ocean: Pacific worlds from Captain Cook to the Gold Rush. Oxford University Press.
- Maloney, A. B. (1943). Fur brigade to the Bonaventura: John Work's California expedition of 1832–33 for the Hudson's Bay Company. California Historical Society Quarterly, 22(3), 193–222. JSTOR 25155793
- Weber, D. J. (1971). The Taos trappers: The fur trade in the far Southwest, 1540–1846. University of Oklahoma Press.
- Weber, D. J. (1982). The Mexican frontier, 1821–1846: The American Southwest under Mexico. University of New Mexico Press.

=== Migration ===
- Bagley, W. (2010). So rugged and mountainous: Blazing the trails to Oregon and California, 1812–1848. University of Oklahoma Press.
- Ball, D. (2001). Army regulars on the western frontier, 1848–1861. University of Oklahoma Press.
- Bigler, D. L., & Bagley, W. (Eds.). (2000). Army of Israel: Mormon Battalion narratives. Arthur H. Clark.
- Carter, R. W. (1995). "Sometimes when I hear the winds sigh": Mortality on the overland trail. California History, 74(2), 146–161. JSTOR 25177489
- Chaffin, T. (2002). Pathfinder: John Charles Frémont and the course of American empire. Hill and Wang.
- Dixon, K. J., Schablitsky, J. M., & Novak, S. A. (Eds.). (2011). An archaeology of desperation: Exploring the Donner Party's Alder Creek camp. University of Oklahoma Press.
- Faragher, J. M. (1979). Women and men on the overland trail. Yale University Press.
- Faragher, J., & Stansell, C. (1975). Women and their families on the overland trail to California and Oregon, 1842–1867. Feminist Studies, 2(2/3), 150–166. JSTOR 3177779
- Greenberg, A. S. (2005). Manifest manhood and the antebellum American empire. Cambridge University Press.
- Haas, L. (1997). War in California, 1846–1848. California History, 76(2–3), 331–355. JSTOR 25161671
- Harlow, N. (1982). California conquered: War and peace on the Pacific, 1846–1850. University of California Press.
- Hawgood, J. A. (1962). John C. Frémont and the Bear Flag Revolution: A reappraisal. Southern California Quarterly, 44(2), 67–96. JSTOR 41169734
- Hyslop, S. G. (2012). Contest for California: From Spanish colonization to the American conquest. Arthur H. Clark Company.
- King, J. A., & Steed, J. (1995). John Baptiste Trudeau of the Donner Party: Rascal or hero? California History, 74(2), 162–173. JSTOR 25177490
- May, R. E. (2002). Manifest destiny's underworld: Filibustering in antebellum America. University of North Carolina Press.
- Moore, S. A. W. (2016). Sweet freedom's plains: African Americans on the overland trails, 1841–1869. University of Oklahoma Press.
- Rarick, E. (2008). Desperate passage: The Donner Party's perilous journey west. Oxford University Press.
- Reid, J. P. (1980). Law for the elephant: Property and social behavior on the overland trail. Huntington Library.
- Ricketts, N. B. (1996). The Mormon Battalion: U.S. Army of the West, 1846–1848. Utah State University Press.
- Spence, M. L., & Jackson, D. (Eds.). (1973). The expeditions of John Charles Frémont: Vol. 2. The Bear Flag Revolt and the court-martial. University of Illinois Press.
- Tate, M. L. (2006). Indians and emigrants: Encounters on the overland trails. University of Oklahoma Press.
- Unruh, J. D., Jr. (1979). The plains across: The overland emigrants and the trans-Mississippi West, 1840–60. University of Illinois Press.
- Walker, D. L. (1999). Bear flag rising: The conquest of California, 1846. Forge Books.

=== Statehood and the Mexican American War ===
- Ball, D. (2001). Army regulars on the western frontier, 1848–1861. University of Oklahoma Press.
- Haas, L. (1997). War in California, 1846–1848. California History, 76(2–3), 331–355. JSTOR 25161671
- Hawgood, J. A. (1962). John C. Frémont and the Bear Flag Revolution: A reappraisal. Southern California Quarterly, 44(2), 67–96. JSTOR 41169734
- Hyslop, S. G. (2012). Contest for California: From Spanish colonization to the American conquest. Arthur H. Clark Company.
- Harlow, N. (1982). California conquered: War and peace on the Pacific, 1846–1850. University of California Press.
- Jackson, D., & Spence, M. L. (Eds.). (1973). The expeditions of John Charles Frémont: Vol. 2. The Bear Flag Revolt and the court-martial. University of Illinois Press.
- Ricketts, N. B. (1996). The Mormon Battalion: U.S. Army of the West, 1846–1848. Utah State University Press.
- Unruh, J. D., Jr. (1979). The plains across: The overland emigrants and the trans-Mississippi West, 1840–60. University of Illinois Press.
- Walker, D. L. (1999). Bear flag rising: The conquest of California, 1846. Forge Books.

== Since 1846 ==
- Arax, M. (2019). The Dreamt Land: Chasing Water and Dust Across California (Illustrated edition). Knopf.
- Beesley, D. (2004). Crow's Range: An Environmental History Of The Sierra Nevada University of Nevada Press
- Blunt, K. (2022). California Burning: The Fall of Pacific Gas and Electric--and What It Means for America’s Power Grid. Portfolio.
- Brands, H. W. (2002). The Age of Gold: The California Gold Rush and the New American Dream. Doubleday.
- Brook, James, Chris Carlsson, and Nancy J. Peters, eds. (1998) Reclaiming San Francisco: history, politics, culture (City Lights Books) online
- Cole, Tom. (2012) A short history of San Francisco (Heyday. ORIM). online
- Ellison, William Henry. (1950) A self-governing dominion, California, 1849-1860 (U of California Press, 1950; 1978 reprint) online, scholarly history.
- Ethington, Philip J. (1994) The public city: the political construction of urban life in San Francisco, 1850-1900 (Cambridge University Press) pnline
- Gordon, Margaret S. Employment expansion and population growth, the California experience: 1900-1950 (1954) online
- Higgins, Andrew Stone. (2023) Higher Education for All: Racial Inequality, Cold War Liberalism, and the California Master Plan. (University of North Carolina Press), online
- Hutchison, Claude Burton. (1946) California agriculture (Univ of California Press, 1946).
- Isenberg, A. C. (2017). The California Gold Rush: A Brief History with Documents. (Bedford/St. Martin's).
- Issel, William, and Robert W. Cherny. (1986) San Francisco, 1865-1932: Politics, power, and urban development.
- Johnson, S. L. (2000). Roaring Camp: The Social World of the California Gold Rush. W W Norton & Co Inc.
- Libecap, G., (2007). Owens Valley Revisited: A Reassessment of the West's First Great Water Transfer Stanford Economics and Finance.
- Lotchin, Roger W. The Bad City in the Good War: San Francisco, Los Angeles, Oakland, and San Diego (Indiana University Press, 2003) online.
- Millard, Bailey. (1924) History of the San Francisco Bay Region: History and Biography (American Historical Society) online
- Nash, Gerald D. State government and economic development : a history of administrative policies in California, 1849-1933 (1964) online
- North, D. M. T. (2018). California at War: The State and the People during World War I (Illustrated edition). University Press of Kansas.
- Olmstead, Alan L., and Paul W. Rhode. (2017) A history of California agriculture (Giannini Foundation). online
- Pincetl, Stephanie S. (2003) Transforming California: A political history of land use and development (JHU Press),
- Rawls, J. J.; Orsi, R. J. eds. (1999) A Golden State: mining and economic development in Gold Rush California University of California Press.
- Richards, Rand. (2007) Historic San Francisco: A concise history and guide (Heritage House Publishers) online
- Runte, A. (1990) Yosemite: The Embattled Wilderness University of Nebraska Press.
- Rosales, Oliver A. (2024). Civil Rights in Bakersfield: Segregation and Multiracial Activism in the Central Valley. University of Texas Press.
- Ruiz, V. L. (1987). Cannery Women, Cannery Lives: Mexican Women, Unionization, and the California Food Processing Industry, 1930-1950. (University of New Mexico Press).
- Sinclair, Mick. (2004) San Francisco: A cultural and literary history. (Signal Books) online.

Academic journal articles

- Biber, Eric (2004). "The Price of Admission: Causes, Effects, and Patterns of Conditions Imposed on States Entering the Union". The American Journal of Legal History. 46 (2): 119–208.
- Burns, J. F. (2003). "Taming the Elephant: An Introduction to California's Statehood and Constitutional Era". California History. 81 (3/4): 1–26. doi:10.2307/25161698 JSTOR 25161698
- Kazin, Michael. (1986) "The Great Exception Revisited: Organized Labor and Politics in San Francisco and Los Angeles, 1870-1940" Pacific Historical Review 55#3 pp. 371–402 JSTOR 3639704.
- Orsi, Richard J. (1991) "Railroads in the History of California and the Far West: An Introduction." California History 70.1 (1991): 2–11. JSTOR 25158549
- Paddison, Joshua (2003). "Capturing California". California History. 81 (3/4): 126–136. doi:10.2307/25161702 JSTOR 25161702.
- Paul, Rodman W. (1973) "The Beginnings of Agriculture in California: Innovation vs. Continuity." California Historical Quarterly 52.1 (1973): 16–27. JSTOR 25157414
- Pisani, Donald J. "Squatter law in California, 1850-1858." Western Historical Quarterly 25.3 (1994): 277–310. JSTOR 971109
- Putnam, Jackson K. (1992) "The pattern of modern California politics." Pacific Historical Review 61.1 (1992): 23–52. JSTOR 3640787
- Stadtman, Verne A. (1970) The University of California, 1868-1968 (McGraw Hill) online
- Stephenson, Nathaniel Wright. (1935) "California and the Compromise of 1850." Pacific Historical Review 4.2 (1935): 114–122. JSTOR 3633723
- White, John H. (1973) "The Railroad Reaches California: Men, Machines, and Cultural Migration." California Historical Quarterly 52.2 (1973): 131–144. JSTOR 25157429

=== Biographical ===
- Arax, M., & Wartzman, R. (2003). The King of California: J.G. Boswell and the Making of A Secret American Empire. PublicAffairs.
- Bullough, William A. (1979) The Blind Boss & His City: Christopher Augustine Buckley and Nineteenth-Century San Francisco (Univ of California Press) online
- Guinn, J. M. Historical and biographical record of southern California; containing a history of southern California from its earliest settlement to the opening year of the twentieth century (1902) 1019 pp by a professional historian. The first 200 pages contain histories of each county. The last 800 pages contain several hundred short biographies. . online
- Larkin, T. O., & Hawgood, J. (1970). First and Last Consul: Thomas O. Larkin and the Americanization of California (Second Edition). (Pacific Book Publishing).
- Pawel, M. (2018). The Browns of California: The Family Dynasty that Transformed a State and Shaped a Nation (Illustrated edition). (Bloomsbury Publishing).
- Standiford, L. (2015). Water to the Angels: William Mulholland, His Monumental Aqueduct, and the Rise of Los Angeles (Illustrated edition). (Ecco).

== Primary sources and historical works ==
This section contains a limited list of primary sources and historical works related to California history.

=== Historical works ===
- Bancroft, H. H. (1884–1890). History of California (Vols. 1–7). History Company.

=== Collections ===
- Brewer, W. H., & Chittenden, R. H. (2011). Up And Down California In 1860-1864: The Journal Of William H. Brewer (F. P. Farquhar, Ed.). Literary Licensing.
- LeConte, J. (1960) A Journal of Ramblings Through the High Sierra of California by the University Excursion Party Sierra Club.
- Murrell, G. M. (2023). “There Is More in Luck than Work”: The Letters of a Young Kentuckian in the California Gold Rush (1849-1854). Ed. Juliette Bourdin. Les Perséides.
- Reed, A. (1994) Old Mammoth: A First Hand Account Live Oak Press
- Roper, S. (1994) Camp 4: Recollections of a Yosemite Rockclimber Mountaineers Books
- Siepel, K. H. (2015). Conquistador Voices: The Spanish Conquest of the Americas as Recounted Largely by the Participants. Spruce Tree Press.
- Siepel, K. H. (2015). Conquistador Voices: The Spanish Conquest of the Americas as Recounted Largely by the Participants. Spruce Tree Press.
- Vallejo, M. G. (2023). Recuerdos: Historical and Personal Remembrances Relating to Alta California, 1769–1849 (R. M. Beebe & R. M. Senkewicz, Trans.). University of Oklahoma Press.

=== Individual documents ===
- "An Act for the Admission of the State of California into the Union" (PDF). The Library of Congress. The Government of the United States. 9 September 1850.

== Historiography ==
- Under construction

== Historical atlases ==
- Browning, P. (1991) Place Names of the Sierra Nevada: From Abbot to Zumwalt, Wilderness Press
- Gudde, E. G. (1998). California Place Names: The Origin and Etymology of Current Geographical Names Fourth edition. (W. Bright, Ed.). University of California Press.
- Hayes, D., & Labonté, C. (2007). Historical Atlas of California: With Original Maps. University of California Press.

== Academic journals ==
- California History (1922–present). Published by the California Historical Society and the University of California Press. ISSN 2327-1485, Print ISSN 0162-2897. (Note: Previously published as California Historical Quarterly (1922-1970) and California Historical Society Quarterly (1971-1977).)
- Pacific Historical Review (1932–present). Published by the University of California Press. Online ISSN 1533-8584, Print ISSN 0030-8684.
- Western Historical Quarterly (1970–present). Published by the Western History Association and Oxford University Press. Print ISSN 0043-3810, Online ISSN 1939-8603.
- The Catholic Historical Review (1915–present). Published by the Catholic University of America Press. Online ISSN 1534-0708, Print ISSN 0008-8080.

== See also ==
- Bibliography of Los Angeles
- Bibliography of Hollywood
- History of California
- Territorial evolution of California
- California State Library
- California Historical Society
