= Jewish Community Library of Los Angeles =

Coordinates: 34.0642°N 118.3701°W

The Jewish Community Library of Los Angeles (JCLLA) was one of the largest free Jewish libraries in the United States. Founded in 1948 by the Jewish Federation of Los Angeles, the Library was started to offer current and accurate information about the Jewish people. The Library housed over 30,000 items, including books, movies, and music. The JCLLA also housed archives of the early Los Angeles Jewish community, including manuscripts and photographs of people, organizations, and places. The Library was a department of the Bureau of Jewish Education, a beneficiary agency of the Jewish Federation of Greater Los Angeles.

The library was permanently closed in 2009.
