= El Norte: The Epic and Forgotten Story of Hispanic North America =

2019 book by Carrie Gibson

- Author: Carrie Gibson
- Audio read by: Thom Rivera
- Language: English
- Subject: New Spain, Spanish Empire
- Genre: Non-fiction, history
- Publisher: Atlantic Monthly Press
- Publication date: 2019
- Pages: 576
- ISBN: 978-0802127020
- Website: Grove Atlantic

El Norte: The Epic and Forgotten Story of Hispanic North America is a book by Carrie Gibson published in 2019 by Atlantic Monthly Press. The work explores the world of New Spain by profiling a variety of centers of Spanish power and settlement, from the earliest settlements in what would become Puerto Rico, Florida and the southeastern United States, to middle American settlements such as New Madrid, Missouri, and settlements in The Californias and what would become the American southwest. The work covers the period from initial Spanish exploration and settlement in North American during the 16th century to the beginning of the 21st century.

== Structure ==
The work begins with normal front material and an author's Introduction about Nogales, Arizona, followed by 16 chapters each focused on a Spanish settlement:

- Chapter 1: Santa Elena, South Carolina, ca. 1492–1550
- Chapter 2: St. Johns River, Florida, ca. 1550–1700
- Chapter 3: Alcade, New Mexico, ca. 1540–1720
- Chapter 4: Fort Mose, Florida, ca. 1600–1760
- Chapter 5: New Madrid, Missouri, ca. 1760–90
- Chapter 6: Nootka Sound, Canada, ca. 1760s–1789
- Chapter 7: New Orleans, Louisiana, ca. 1790–1804
- Chapter 8: Sabine River, ca. 1804–23
- Chapter 9: San Antonio de Béxar, Texas, ca. 1820–48
- Chapter 10: Mesilla, New Mexico, ca. 1850–77
- Chapter 11: Ybor City, Florida, ca. 1870–98
- Chapter 12: Del Rio, Texas, ca. 1910–40
- Chapter 13: New York, ca. 1920s–'60s
- Chapter 14: Los Angeles, California ca. 1920s–'70s
- Chapter 15: Miami, Florida, ca. 1960–80
- Chapter 16: Tucson, Arizona, ca. 1994–2018

The work concludes with an epilogue about Georgia in 1914, a bibliography and timeline of key events.

== Reviews ==
- Crandall, R., "El Norte: The Epic and Forgotten Story of Hispanic North America", American Quarterly
- Feinberg, R. (2020), "El Norte: The Epic and Forgotten Story of Hispanic North America", Foreign Affairs
- Kaiser, C. (2019), "El Norte review: an epic and timely history of Hispanic North America", The Guardian
- Ortega, J. (2019), "Anglos, Hispanics and the Formation of America", New York Times
- Sherman, M. (2019), "Carrie Gibson's El Norte Recenters the Continent's Hispanic History", Jezebel
- Duffy, B., "El Norte: The Epic and Forgotten Story of Hispanic North America", Washington Independent Review of Books

== Publication history ==
- Gibson, C. (2019). El Norte: The Epic and Forgotten Story of Hispanic North America (Original hardback edition, audiobook, and ebook). Atlantic Monthly Press.
- Gibson, C. (2020). El Norte: The Epic and Forgotten Story of Hispanic North America (Paperback edition). Grove/Atlantic.

== About the author ==
Carrie Gibson is a British author and historian focusing on the Spanish Caribbean in the era of the Haitian Revolution. They earned their PhD from Cambridge University. In addition to El Notre are also the author of Empire's Crossroads: A History of the Caribbean from Columbus to the Present Day published by Atlantic Monthly Press in 2014.

== See also ==
- Territorial evolution of the United States
- Louisiana (New Spain)
- Spanish Empire
