= Jacob Frankfort =

Polish-American Jew

Jacob Frankfort (born 1801, date of death unknown) was the first known Jew to come to Los Angeles. He immigrated from Poland in 1841. He was joined by other Central European Jews. By 1855, there were 60 Jews living in Los Angeles.

Frankfort arrived in Los Angeles as a member of the Rowland-Workman exploratory party. The party had come to the city from Santa Fe, New Mexico. Jacob's position in the team was bolstered by skills of tailoring and ownership of a rifle.

== Business ==
Frankfort was a wealthy man. This fact is reflected in Rafael Gallardo's declaration of bankruptcy, which states that Jacob Frankfort was owed $400 in 1845. Frankfort started his business with a tailoring and men's apparel store in Bell's Row, an adobe building. When Mellus bought Bell's Row from Bell, it was Frankfort who lent him the money. Subsequently, Bell's Row name was changed to Mellus' Row. Bell's Row was well located: all the traffic coming in from the Los Angeles River arrived at the corner of Aliso and Los Angeles streets, which was where the Bell's Row was situated.

== Sources ==
- "L.A. Scene / The City Then and Now". CECILIA RASMUSSEN. Los Angeles Times, March 21, 1994.
