= Pickford: The Woman Who Made Hollywood =

1997 biography by Eileen Whitfield

- Author: Eileen Whitfield
- Language: English
- Subject: Mary Pickford
- Genre: Biography
- Publisher: Macfarlane Walter & Ross, University Press of Kentucky
- Publication date: 1997

Pickford: The Woman Who Made Hollywood is a 1997 biography of actress Mary Pickford (1892–1979) written by Eileen Whitfield. The book took ten years to complete and was published by Macfarlane Walter & Ross in Canada and by the University Press of Kentucky in the United States. The book won the UBC President's Medal in Biography.

== Film adaptation ==
On October 12, 2012, it was reported that there will be a Mary Pickford biopic based on the novel. On October 17 of that year, it was reported that actress Lily Rabe will star as Pickford in the film. On January 31, 2013, it was announced that Julia Stiles will star as screenwriter Frances Marion. The cast also includes Michael Pitt as Owen Moore, Pickford's first husband, James Wirt as Charlie Chaplin and David Strathairn as director D.W. Griffith. The film has been in production since early 2013. In July 2017, the producers of the movie let the rights to film Whitfield's book expire.
