= An Empire of Their Own =

1988 book by Neal Gabler

An Empire of Their Own: How the Jews Invented Hollywood
- Author: Neal Gabler
- Language: English
- Genre: Nonfiction
- Publisher: Crown
- Publication date: 1988
- Publication place: United States
- Media type: Print (Hardback and paperback)
- Pages: 502 pp (hardback)
- ISBN: 0-385-26557-3

An Empire of Their Own: How the Jews Invented Hollywood is a 1988 non-fiction book about the careers of prominent Jewish American film producers and businessmen in the early years of Hollywood. Author Neal Gabler focuses on the motivations of these film moguls, arguing that their background as Jewish immigrants shaped their careers and influenced the movies they made.

== Themes ==
Gabler's main thesis is that these producers (whom Gabler terms "Hollywood Jews") generally came from poor, fatherless backgrounds, and felt like outsiders in America because of their Jewishness. In Hollywood, these producers were able to run their own industry, assimilate into the American mainstream, and produce movies that fulfilled their vision of the American Dream. In an interview with LA Times, Gabler speaks about the title of the book and the American Dream:

They had a hunger for assimilation and, in the face of resistance and exclusion, "the Jews could simply create new a country--an empire of their own, so to speak . . . an America where fathers were strong, families stable, people attractive, resilient, resourceful, and decent." The 20th-Century American Dream was to a considerable degree depicted and defined by Hollywood.

Gabler asserts that the nature of their business and their movies can often be traced back to their feelings of alienation as immigrants.

The book also explains that the business background of the Hollywood Jews in theatre-ownership, retail distribution, and the garment industry shaped the approach these studio owners took to crafting movies for a popular audience, one similar to the marketing of films as commodities as well as works of art.

The title of the book is a reference to F. Scott Fitzgerald's unfinished novel The Last Tycoon, in which Fitzgerald describes his protagonist, Monroe Stahr (a character inspired by the producer Irving Thalberg) as "coming home to an empire of his own—an empire he has made." The book won the 1989 Los Angeles Times Book Prize for history and the 1989 Theatre Library Association Award.

== Adaptations ==
The book was adapted into a documentary film in 1998, a decade after the book was published. The movie has two titles: Hollywoodism: Jews, Movies and the American Dream (original title for A&E) and Hollywood: An Empire of Their Own (title for video/DVD). The documentary won an award for Best Jewish Experience Documentary at the 1998 Jerusalem Film Festival.

== See also ==
- Cinema of the United States
- Jews in American cinema
- List of Jewish American entertainers § Film/television directors and producers
- List of Jewish American businesspeople in media § Television, film and video
- Major film studios ("The Big Five")
- Classical Hollywood cinema (Hollywood's Golden Age)
