= Walt Disney: The Triumph of the American Imagination =

2006 book by Neal Gabler

- Author: Neal Gabler
- Language: English
- Subject: Walt Disney
- Genre: biography
- Publisher: Alfred A. Knopf
- Publication date: October 31, 2006
- Publication place: United States
- Pages: 851
- ISBN: 978-0-679-43822-9
- OCLC: 232315401

Walt Disney: The Triumph of the American Imagination is a biography about Walt Disney, written by the American journalist Neal Gabler. It was published by Alfred A. Knopf in 2006.

It was awarded the Los Angeles Times Book Prize for Biography.
