= Neal Gabler =

American journalist (born 1950)

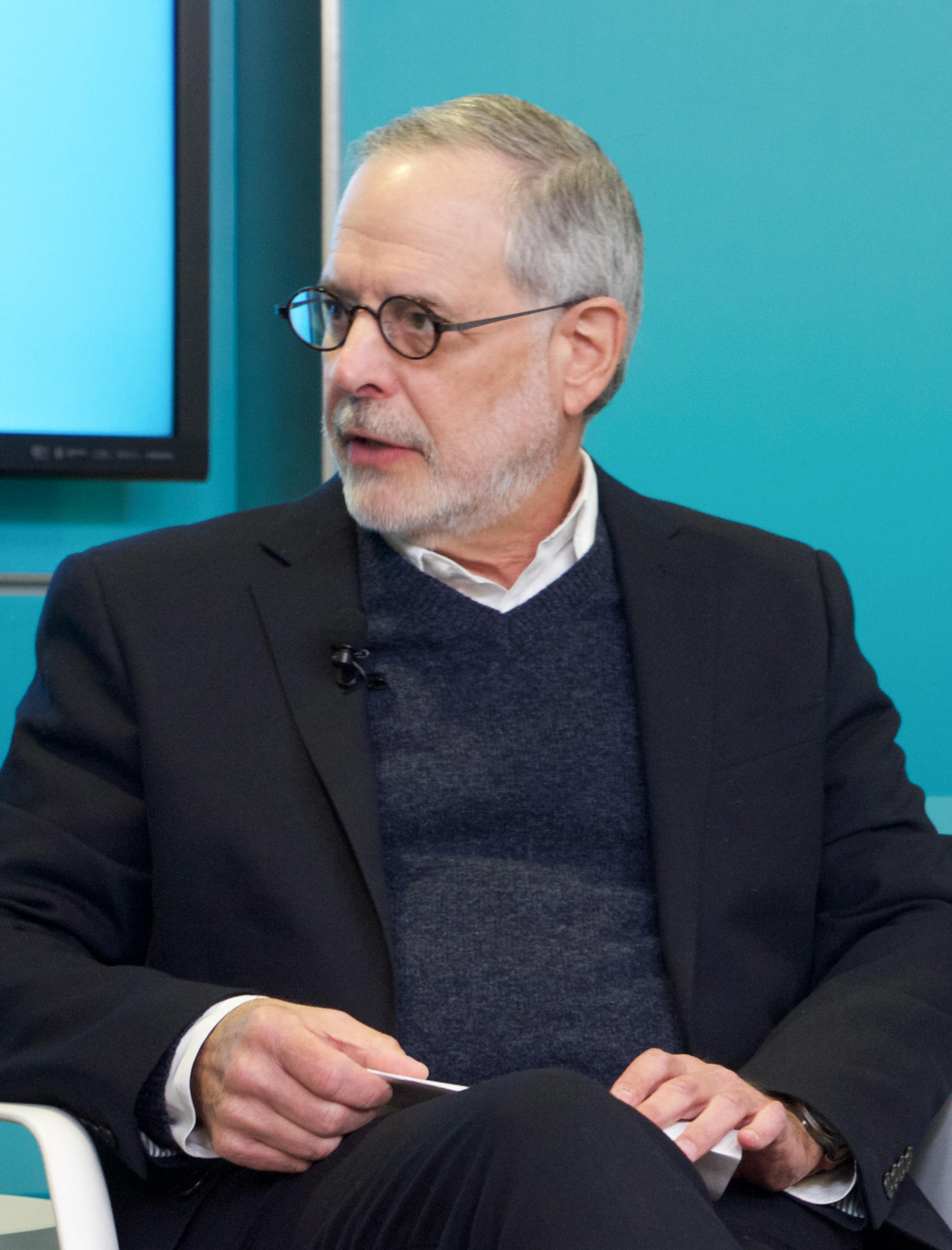
- Gabler in 2017
- Born: 1950 (age 75–76); Chicago, Illinois, U.S.
- Education: University of Michigan
- Occupations: Journalist, writer, broadcaster
- Employer: University of Southern California
- Known for: Novels, journalism, political commentary, film reviews
- Spouse: Christina Gabler
- Children: 1

Neal Gabler (born 1950) is an American journalist, writer and film critic.

== Education ==
Gabler graduated from Lane Tech High School in Chicago, Illinois, class of 1967, and was inducted into the National Honor Society. He graduated summa cum laude from the University of Michigan and holds advanced degrees in both film and American culture.

== Career ==
Gabler has contributed to numerous publications including The New York Times, the Los Angeles Times, Esquire, New York, Vogue, American Heritage, The New Republic, Us, and Playboy. He has appeared on many television programs, including The Today Show, CBS Morning News, The News Hour, Entertainment Tonight, Charlie Rose, and Good Morning America. He hosted Sneak Previews for PBS, and introduced films on the cable network AMC.

He is the author of seven books: An Empire of Their Own: How the Jews Invented Hollywood (1989), Winchell: Gossip, Power and the Culture of Celebrity (1994), Life the Movie: How Entertainment Conquered Reality (1998); Walt Disney: The Triumph of the American Imagination (2006); Barbra Streisand: Redefining Beauty, Femininity, and Power (2016); Catching the Wind: Edward Kennedy and the Liberal Hour 1932–1975 (2020); and Against the Wind: Edward Kennedy and the Rise of Conservatism, 1976–2009 (2022).

In 1982, Gabler paired with Jeffrey Lyons as replacement movie reviewers for the PBS show Sneak Previews. The original hosts of Sneak Previews, Roger Ebert and Gene Siskel, had left the show for contractual reasons and Gabler and Lyons went to Chicago to produce the show. He was a writer for the Detroit Free Press at the time. Gabler left Sneak Previews in 1985 citing differences with the direction of the show. He was replaced by Michael Medved, who had had occasional appearances on Sneak Previews before replacing Gabler full-time.

In a 1988 interview, he remarked that "I'm a great believer both politically and aesthetically in pluralism. There ought to be movies for everybody. There ought to be movies for teenagers and there ought to be Police Academys – so long as they're well-made and I certainly won't begrudge anyone that – and there ought to be Tender Mercies and there ought to be Indiana Joneses."

Gabler was one of four panelists on the Fox News Channel show, Fox News Watch. On February 2, 2008, the show's host, Eric Burns, announced Gabler had left the show to work for PBS.

In 2016, Gabler attracted commentary for his cover story in The Atlantic entitled "The Shame of Middle Class Americans", in which he described the precarious debt and financial difficulties of many middle and upper class Americans, and described in some detail his own financial insecurity.

Gabler has taught at the University of Michigan and at Pennsylvania State University. As of September 2011, Gabler is a Research Fellow at the Shorenstein Center on Media, Politics, and Public Policy at Harvard University's Kennedy School of Government. As of 2021 he is on the writing faculty at Stony Brook Southampton, and has been a Senior Fellow at the USC Annenberg Norman Lear Center. An excerpt from Life the Movie: How Entertainment Conquered Reality by Gabler was used on the AP English Language exam.

== Personal life ==
Gabler is married to Christina Gabler. They have one daughter. As of 2020, the couple resides in Amagansett, New York.

In December 2020, Gabler sold his home on Dennistoun Drive in the East Hampton area which he purchased in the late 1990s for $2 million.

=== Political views ===
Gabler has criticized modern conservatism for abandoning its traditional moral constraints like shame, which once served as a check on excesses, allowing notable figures like Donald Trump to have accountability that would have shamed conservatives in the past. In an op-ed for the Los Angeles Times in May 2011, he stated that the United States under conservative dominance had evolved into a "stony-hearted" society, only prioritizing individual self-interest and market forces instead of empathy and communal obligations, which leads to policies that exacerbate inequality without remorse. He has since portrayed conservatives as very distrustful of the modern Western liberal democracy, instead exhibiting an obsession for authority figures and structures, as evidenced by praise from Republicans for Vladimir Putin during Trump's first presidency, which Gabler interprets not only as mere partisanship but as a revelation for deeper ideological preferences for a strong rule instead of democratic norms.

In his 2022 book Against the Wind: Edward Kennedy and the Rise of Conservatism, 1976-2009, Gabler chronicled the ascendance of conservatism through the eyes of Senator Edward Kennedy's efforts on bipartisan legislative issues like children's education and health, contrasting his willingness to transcend partisanship with the growing rigidity of Republican opposition, which he depicts as transforming the GOP into a force of obstructionist resistant to compromise. Gabler has attributed that this shift of conservatism's evolution into a dogmatic ideology more in line to a "civic religion," where adherence to such principles like limited government overriding the empirical evidence of social needs, culminating in such efforts like dismantling the welfare state. He has described the current state of the Republican party as having morphed into a world of "party of hate and obstruction," and instead operating more like a cult instead of a political institution, with compromise being viewed instead as a moral betrayal and enemies being demonized rather than engaged.

On recent politics, Gabler has been very critical of Donald Trump, warning in April 2024 that a Trump victory in the then-upcoming 2024 presidential election would irreversibly end America as a democratic entity, calling the GOP's transformation under Trump to a "Nazified" state driven by an authoritarian impulse. In a August 2025 Substack essay, he argued that Trump's rise to power stemmed from a public boredom with the conventional governance, enabling a figure who instead prioritizes spectacle and disruption over its institutional stability, resulting in some epistemological and moral chaos being marked by "fake" narratives that erode the truth. Gabler has stated that Trump's evasion of moral opprobrium highlights conservatism's ultimate rejection of traditional core ethical restraints, with Trumpism's core grievances not against the idea of liberalism but instead against morality itself, allowing ruthless pursuits of power under the guise of populism. He has predicted that the damages from the Trump era, including such normalized authoritarianism and weakened democratic guardrails, will be permanent, as conservatism has instead prioritized its ideological purity over its restorative governance.

== Awards ==
- Outstanding Teaching Award, University of Michigan, 1978
- Los Angeles Times Book Prize for History (An Empire of Their Own), 1989
- Prix Litteraire (Best Foreign Book on Film or Television Published in French)
- National Book Critics Circle Award for Biography Finalist (Winchell), 1995
- Time Magazine Nonfiction Book of the Year (Winchell), 1995
- John Simon Guggenheim Memorial Fellowship, 2005
- USA Today Biography of the Year (Walt Disney), 2007
- Los Angeles Times Book Prize for Biography (Walt Disney) 2007
- Kraszna-Krausz Award Runner-Up
- Emmy Award, Best Short-Form Writing, 2009
- Shorenstein Fellowship, Harvard University, 2011
- Tannenbaum Lecturer, Emory University
- Patrick Henry Writing Fellowship, Washington College, 2013

== Filmography ==
- Sneak Previews (1982–1985)
- Jack L. Warner: The Last Mogul (1993)
- Walter Winchell: Gossip, Power and the Culture of Celebrity (1995)
- Off the Menu: The Last Days of Chasen's (1997)
- Hollywoodism: Jews, Movies and the American Dream (1998)
- Warner Bros. 75th Anniversary: No Guts, No Glory (1998)
- Earl Cunningham: The Dragon of Saint George Street (2004) WMFE-Orlando Documentary
- Imaginary Witness: Hollywood and the Holocaust (2004)
- Ring of Fire: The Emile Griffith Story (2005)

== Books ==
- An Empire of Their Own: How the Jews Invented Hollywood. Crown, 1988
- Winchell: Gossip, Power and the Culture of Celebrity. Knopf, 1994
- Life: the Movie – How Entertainment Conquered Reality. Knopf, 1998
- Walt Disney: The Triumph of the American Imagination. Knopf, 2006
- Barbra Streisand: Redefining Beauty, Femininity, and Power. Yale University Press, 2016
- Catching the Wind: Edward Kennedy and the Liberal Hour 1932–1975. Crown, 2020
- Against the Wind: Edward Kennedy and the Rise of Conservatism, 1976–2009. Crown, 2022
