= Strange Nature (film) =

- Theatrical release poster
- Directed by: Jim Ojala
- Written by: Jim Ojala
- Produced by: Jim Ojala; Beth Meadows; Jessica Bergren; Jeff Miller
- Starring: Lisa Sheridan; Bruce Bohne; Jonah Beres
- Cinematography: Alec Schwandt
- Distributed by: ITN Films; Devilworks
- Release date: September 21, 2018
- Running time: 100 minutes
- Country: United States

Strange Nature is a 2018 independent ecothriller film written and directed by special-effects artist Jim Ojala in his feature directorial debut.

Inspired by a real-life pandemic of mass frog deformities discovered in Minnesota, the plot of Strange Nature follows a former pop star (Lisa Sheridan) and her young son (Jonah Beres) moving to rural Minnesota to reconnect with her estranged father (Bruce Bohne), only to find themselves in danger when the mutations begin infecting animals and humans. The film features an ensemble cast that includes Stephen Tobolowsky, Carlos Alazraqui, John Hennigan, and Tiffany Shepis.

Shot in Minnesota in the summer of 2014, Strange Nature spent several years in post-production before making its theatrical debut in September 2018, where it was met with mixed critical reviews.

== Plot ==
Based on a true unsolved ecological mystery, thousands of hideously deformed frogs have turned up in the waters of Minnesota. As seen through the eyes of a one-hit wonder, single mother and her 11-year-old son, a small town struggles with the unknown when the deadly mutations move beyond the ponds.

== Cast ==
- Lisa Sheridan as Kim Sweet
- Bruce Bohne as Chuck
- Jonah Beres as Brody
- John Hennigan as Sam
- Carlos Alazraqui as Greg
- Stephen Tobolowsky as Mayor Paulson
- Tiffany Shepis as Tina Stevens
- David Mattey as Joseph
- Chalet Lizette Brannan as Michelle
- Faust Checho as Trent
- Angela Duffy as Judy
- Justen Overlander as Larry

== Factual basis ==
In August 1995, a group of students on a field trip discovered hundreds of deformed frogs occupying a pond near Henderson, Minnesota. These deformities typically consisted of missing or extra limbs, misplaced eyes, misshapen jaws, and spinal defects, among other conditions. By 1996, mutated frogs had been reported in 35 US states and three Canadian provinces, including nearly three-quarters of Minnesota's 87 counties. From 1998 to 2000, the Minnesota governor and legislature gave the Minnesota Pollution Control Agency funding to study frog deformities, and they worked closely with scientists and researchers from the University of Minnesota, the National Institute of Environmental Health Sciences, the United States Geological Survey, the National Wildlife Health Center, and the United States Environmental Protection Agency to investigate the problem. Despite this, no conclusive answer as to what was causing the deformities was found, and in July 2001, funding for the study was withdrawn.

== Production ==
Writer-director Jim Ojala, a native of Duluth, Minnesota, followed the events of the frog mutations as they occurred; as he recalled in a 2018 interview, "seeing these wild mutant looking frogs on the front page of your local newspaper totally felt like sci-fi/horror come to life". As Ojala progressed in his career as a filmmaker and special-effects artist and populations of deformed frogs continued to grow worldwide, he drew upon the mutations as the basis for his feature-film debut, surprised that a movie or documentary had never been made about the subject. Ojala wrote the screenplay for Strange Nature in the early-to-mid-2000s, and has cited William Souder's 2000 non-fiction book A Plague of Frogs as a major source of the movie's scientific facts and theories. During preproduction, Ojala consulted with several leading ecologists on the deformed frog phenomenon, one of whom was so supportive of the film that they supplied the production with actual deformed frogs that were used in several scenes.

According to Ojala, he pitched Strange Nature as "Erin Brockovich...with monsters". Several producers initially showed interest in the project, though many of them voiced skepticism over Ojala's insistence on shooting in and using cast and crew from Minnesota, preferring to film in more commonly used locations such as Louisiana or Bulgaria. Some producers felt at odds with the unusual dramatic and realism ground tone of the script and requested rewrites to fit more conventional horror or science-fiction tropes: "One producer said I should end the movie with the reason for the deformities being aliens", Ojala recalled, "I never talked to that producer again". To retain more creative control over the film, a Kickstarter campaign was launched to help independently finance a portion of Strange Nature, setting a goal of $45,000. Due to Ojala's reputation in the film industry as a special-effects artist, the campaign was promoted by such prominent horror publication as Fangoria and successfully met its goal, raising a total of $46,088.

Casting for Strange Nature took place between June and July 2014, with several principal roles filled by local Minnesota actors. For the role of Mayor Paulson, Ojala extended offers to numerous high-profile actors, including Kurt Russell and John Goodman - "people we had no business talking to", he mused, "at least we tried". Ultimately, the part went to veteran character actor Stephen Tobolowsky, who was "excited" to take on the role, as he felt the character was written realistically, rather than as a villainous archetype. Principal photography took place over 19 days in August 2014 throughout Minnesota, primarily Duluth and parts of rural Itasca County. Ojala recounted the shoot as being "quite difficult", noting a "grueling" schedule, a lack of cellphone and computer communications in their remote locations, and the complications of breaking "every rule in the indie film book: we had tons of locations, tons of characters, makeup/creature effects, stunts, puppets, animals, kids, even a newborn baby". Ojala likened it to "figuring out how to make a feature like it was the early 90s". Actor John Hennigan admitted that though the intense filming conditions were often tough, the experience was an overall positive one. "The sense of camaraderie after finishing this project was really rewarding", he told Digital Journal, "and the bond you have with the people may last for years, or sometimes a lifetime".

With the majority of filming completed in Minnesota, several pick-ups and more intricate special-effects shots were finished in Los Angeles. In a November 29, 2015, post on the official Strange Nature Facebook page, these inserts were announced to have been completed and the film was "100% in the can". Updates on Strange Nature's postproduction status were sporadically shared on the movie's social media until June 20, 2017, when work on film was finally announced to be complete.

== Release and reception ==
The first teaser trailer for Strange Nature was released on July 24, 2015. As postproduction continued throughout 2016 and into 2017, the film began to generate internet buzz among horror and indie film websites. Moviepilot placed Strange Nature on their list of "10 Indie Horror Films Coming Out in 2017 You Don't Want to Miss", while humor website Cracked.com put it on their fall 2017 list of "Crazy-Looking Movies You've Never Heard Of", describing the film as "It's like Jaws, but if the shark was a frog. What's not to fucking love?". The final trailer was released on December 22, 2017 and was featured on several prominent film websites, including Dread Central and JoBlo.com's Arrow in the Head.

Strange Nature had its official premiere at Los Angeles' Laemmle Glendale Theatre on September 22, 2018, which then ran for an exclusive week-long engagement. In October, the film was to be screened as part of the Great Western Catskills International Film Festival in Andes, New York, followed by theatrical runs in Duluth and St. Louis Park, Minnesota. A video on demand, Redbox, and Amazon release was planned for the fall.

On the prospect of a sequel, Ojala remarked in an interview with HorrorNews.net, "we want to see how the film does and we leave it open-ended where there could absolutely be a sequel".

=== Critical reception ===
Strange Nature received mixed reviews from critics. It holds an approval rating of 43% on the aggregate review site Rotten Tomatoes, based on seven reviews, with an average rating of 4.4/10.

Freddy Beans of Ain't It Cool News called it an "awesome little horror gem" and a "brilliant freshman effort" for director Ojala, commending the "fantastic" cinematography and creature effects and concluding "I can't explain how much I really enjoyed my time watching this unique experience". Horror magazine Rue Morgue delivered most of its praise onto the film's ensemble cast, namely its "three-dimensional characterizations" and Lisa Sheridan's performance, describing the overall film as "[weaving] threads of Erin Brockovich, It's Alive, and Cabin Fever into a quirky, nasty, sometimes inspiring tapestry of unlikely-hero-vs.-enviro-terror". The Los Angeles Times was slightly more ambivalent, feeling the film lacked scares but nevertheless praised the "top-notch" creature effects and "likeable characters", complimenting the small town "slice of life" angle and giving Ojala "kudos" for "making his setting essential to his story".

FanSided's Hidden Remote, titling their review with "science-fiction meets real science in perfect blend", appreciated the film's environmental messages, acknowledging Ojala for "[presenting] all these issues in an entertaining fashion" as well as noting the "phenomenal" chemistry between the ensemble cast. Horror Fuel awarded Strange Nature a perfect rating of 5 stars, applauding the depth and relatability of the characters, writing "everything just congeals into a highly effective, borderline realistic, terror tale that is as disturbing (and trust me it gets very disturbing) as it is engaging". 28 Days Later Analysis lauded the "compelling" and "well-drawn" characters, "excellent" make-up effects and the film's use of dark humor, stating "Strange Nature offers a lot in its short, but bloody runtime" and "indie horror fans should see this production".

Bobby LePire of Film Threat gave the film a negative review, stating "The directing style of Strange Nature fails to bring any atmosphere, the acting is so nondescript that it barely registers (with two notable exceptions), and a lack of cohesive vision leaves the movie uncertain of what it truly is. An absolute waste of time for all involved, especially the audience." Although he panned most performances, including Sheridan's, whom he called "an entirely blank slate", he did praise the performances of Stephen Tobolowsky and John Hennigan.

Chloe Leeson of Screen Queen gave a similarly negative review, stating "Whilst there are some more intriguing loose ends that never come to fruition (largely wondering what happens to the people who go missing in the woods?) in favour of a shoed-in romance and loose emotional connections between various mediocre characters, Strange Nature is ultimately the creation of a first-time director - lots of promising ideas, but not enough editing. Achievements in campy creature fun and practical effects that horror fans love might not be enough to keep audiences in seats past an unstable first hour."
