= Sandy Wollschlager =

American chemist and politician

- Wollschlager atop her horse at Fort Snelling in 2008

Member of the Minnesota House of Representatives from the 28A district
- In office January 1, 2007 – January 4, 2009
- Preceded by: Jerry Dempsey
- Succeeded by: Tim Kelly

Personal details
- Born: December 19, 1957 (age 68) Austin, Minnesota, U.S.
- Party: Democratic–Farmer–Labor
- Spouse: Joe Wollschlager (m. 1976)
- Children: 2
- Education: Albert Lea Technical College (A.A.); Augsburg College (B.S.); Harvard University (MPA)
- Occupation: Chemist

Sandra Gaye Wollschlager (née Voss; born December 19, 1957) is an American chemist and politician. She served in the Minnesota House of Representatives as a representative of the 28A district from 2007 to 2009. A member of the Minnesota Democratic–Farmer–Labor Party, Wollschlager was defeated by Republican challenger Tim Kelly in the 2008 election.

== Early life ==
Sandra Gaye Voss was born on December 19, 1957, in Austin, Minnesota. After graduating from Austin High School in 1976, Wollschlager worked at a turkey factory before becoming certified as a laboratory technician at Albert Lea Technical College. She then graduated with a Bachelor of Science in chemistry from Augsburg College and a master's degree in public administration from the John F. Kennedy School of Government of Harvard University.

== Career ==
Wollschlager started as a lab technician at 3M starting around 1980. Her position at the time of her first campaign for state legislature was as a research and development senior specialist in regulatory affairs. She was also part of the "3M Visiting Wizard" program, which saw her visit public schools and give science demonstrations. Wollschlager was a member of the board of Cannon Falls Area Schools for her hometown of Cannon Falls, Minnesota, from 1997 until 2005.

=== Early runs for legislature ===
Wollschlager first ran for the Minnesota House of Representatives in 2002, challenging longtime incumbent Jerry Dempsey for the District 28A seat, which included parts of Goodhue and Wabasha counties. Wollschlager ran on a campaign of maintaining the quality of public education in the state, improving the safety of roads in rural Minnesota, and improving the environmental effects and work conditions of the manufacturing industry. Wollschlager ultimately lost to Dempsey, securing 7,004 votes, or 43% of the share, compared to Dempsey's 9,284 for 57%.

Wollschlager challenged Dempsey again in 2004, again focusing on education funding along with relicensing the Prairie Island Nuclear Power Plant, providing economic development in southeastern Minnesota, and to pass a bonding bill. Wollschlager was defeated in the general election, though by a narrower margin than in 2002. Wollschlager totaled 9,380 votes, or 46.4% of the share, compared to Dempsey's 10,821 for 53.53%.

=== Legislative career ===
Wollschlager again stood in the 2006 election for the 28A seat. Wollschlager faced Dan Ryan, a self-employed farmer from Goodhue, in the DFL primary. During her campaign, Wollschlager stressed the importance of revitalizing the economy of and creating jobs for greater Minnesota and improving the state's education system. Wollschlager soundly defeated Ryan in the primary, totaling 2,143 votes, or a 62% share, compared to Ryan's 1,324 votes. She advanced to the general election to face Republican Gary Iocco, who ran unopposed in the GOP primary after incumbent Dempsey declined to seek a eighth term. She defeated Iocco in the general election, securing 8,395 votes, or 51.36% of the share, to Iocco's 7,899 votes.

In office, Wollschlager served as vice chair for the House Taxes Committee, and was also a member of the House Governmental Operations, Reform, Technology, and Elections Committee and the Veterans Affairs division of the House Agriculture, Rural Economies, and Veterans Affairs Committee. Wollschlager sponsored the first piece of legislation to pass out of committee during the 2007 session, when her tax law measure was unanimously approved by the House Taxes Committee. The bill allowed higher education tuition and teachers' classroom expenses to be deducted through the state tax system. The bill also permitted individual retirement account contributions from military members' non-taxable combat pay. The bill passed the House unanimously on January 11. The bill became the first law passed by the 85th Minnesota Legislature upon the governor's approval on January 30.

Wollschlager's challenger in the 2008 election was Republican Tim Kelly, a financial adviser from Red Wing in his first campaign for state office. Wollschlager emphasized the economy during her campaign, citing her support for bills that would create jobs in the area and improve the infrastructure of southeastern Minnesota. The Minnesota Star Tribune called the race between Wollschlager and Kelly as "one of the most closely-watched races" of the cycle, with Wollschlager heavily backed by Minnesota House Speaker Margaret Anderson Kelliher. Wollschlager lost to Kelly by 791 votes in the general election, with 9,911 votes compared to Kelly's 10,702. Kelliher called Wollschlager's defeat the most surprising of the night, while Kelly's win was described as an upset by Associated Press reporter Martiga Lohn. AP reporting later said that the DFL House Caucus spent about $49,000 defending Wollschlager, while Republican groups spent near that amount campaigning against her.

=== Post-legislative career ===
Wollschlager co-produced the 2011 film Women Making Change, a collaborative documentary film project by Twin Cities PBS and the Minnesota chapter of the American Association of University Women. The film highlighted the experiences of women in Minnesota politics and featured interviews with Joanell Dyrstad, Joan Growe, Margaret Anderson Kelliher, Lori Sturdevant, Kathy Tingelstad, and herself.

In 2014, Wollschlager ran for the Goodhue County Board of Commissioners as a representative of District 2. She was eliminated in the primary election, where she finished in third with 202 votes, or 19% of the total share.

== Personal life ==
Sandy Voss married high school classmate Joe Wollschlager in 1976. Together, they have a son, Carl, and daughter, Lindsey. Wollschlager is a Lutheran.

Preceded by Jerry Dempsey	Member of the Minnesota House of Representatives from the 28A district January 1, 2007 – January 4, 2009	Succeeded by Tim Kelly
