= William Souder =

American journalist and author

- Born: 1949 (age 76–77); Minneapolis, Minnesota, U.S.
- Education: University of Minnesota
- Occupations: Author, journalist
- Notable work: A Plague of Frogs; Mad at the World: A Life of John Steinbeck

William Souder (born 1949) is an American journalist and non-fiction author.

== Career ==
In 1996, Souder wrote a story about deformed frogs discovered in Henderson, Minnesota which was published on the front page of The Washington Post and covered on television news by Dan Rather. Souder parlayed the publicity into a deal for his first book, A Plague of Frogs, which was published in 2000.

In 2003, at age 54, Souder decided to write his first biography, a profile of John James Audubon. His book, Under a Wild Sky: John James Audubon and the Making of The Birds of America, was a finalist for Pulitzer Prize for Biography or Autobiography. His book On A Farther Shore: The Life and Legacy of Rachel Carson, a biography of ecologist Rachel Carson, was listed in New York Times 100 Notable Books of 2012 and Top 25 Best Non-Fiction book in 2012 by Kirkus Reviews.

Souder won the Los Angeles Times Book Prize for Biography in 2021 for his book Mad at the World: A Life of John Steinbeck. To research for the book, Souder spent months in Steinbeck's native California, including time at the National Steinbeck Center in Salinas, Center for Steinbeck Studies at San Jose State University, and the Steinbeck Collection at Stanford University. At the National Steinbeck Center, he transcribed for the first time hours of interviews of Salinas locals who had known Steinbeck personally.

== Personal life ==
Souder was born in Minneapolis but moved to Florida in the second grade. After four years in the United States Navy, he returned to Minnesota to study journalism at the University of Minnesota. While at Minnesota, he wrote for the Minnesota Daily. By the year 2000, he was married with four children and building a home in Grant, Minnesota. As of 2019, he was living in that home.

== Bibliography ==
- A Plague of Frogs: The Horrifying True Story. Hyperion, 2000.
- Under a Wild Sky: John James Audubon and the Making of The Birds of America. North Point Press, 2004.
- On a Farther Shore: The Life and Legacy of Rachel Carson, Author of Silent Spring. Crown, 2012
- Mad at the World: A Life of John Steinbeck. W. W. Norton & Company, 2020.
