= A Plague of Frogs =

2000 book by William Souder

- A Plague of Frogs: The Horrifying True Story
- Author: William Souder
- Cover artist: Jon Valk (photograph by Martin Ouellet)
- Publisher: Hyperion
- Publication date: March 15, 2000
- Pages: 304
- ISBN: 0-7868-6360-9
- OCLC: 43060405
- Dewey Decimal: 597.8/9 21
- LC Class: QL668.E2 S737 2000

A Plague of Frogs is a nonfiction environmental book by William Souder, published in 2000 by Hyperion Press. The book elaborates on the issue of mutated frogs and the implications for humans. It is divided into two parts.

== Chapters ==
=== Part One: The Hell ===
- Henderson
- From Here to There
- Unknown chapter
- Surprised but Not Crazy
- Metamorphosis
- When the Fish Began to Walk
- Rumors. Theories. Rules of Engagement
- Choosing Sides
- The Biggest Experiment Ever

=== Part Two: Famous Last Days of the Golden Toad ===
- Uncertainties
- Bad Weather
- "We've Found Something in the Water"
- Bad Boy
- The Green Mountain

== Synopsis ==
The book begins with the discovery of a large number of deformed frogs by schoolteacher Cindy Reinitz and her students in August 1995. They were on a field trip to a farm owned by Donald Ney near Henderson, Minnesota. As the students approached the rain-fed pond, they noticed that a large number of the northern leopard frogs (Rana pipiens) had deformities, such as missing legs, extra legs, and other disfigurements. Concerned about the possibility that a contaminant in the water caused the deformities, Reinitz contacted the Minnesota Pollution Control Agency (MPCA). As the MPCA did not have an amphibian specialist at the time, Reinitz was referred to the MPCA's invertebrate researcher, Dr. Judy Helgen. At the time, Helgen was studying frogs as part of an effort to develop a bio-index for measuring the overall health of a pond or wetland. As Helgen was busy at the time, she sent an intern, Joel Chirhart, to investigate the pond. Chirhart was alarmed by how widespread the deformities were—present in over 1/3 of frogs collected.

Later that year, Helgen called Robert McKinnell, a biologist at the University of Minnesota. McKinnell is considered the authority on frogs in Minnesota, having specialized in herpetology for over 50 years. Initially the two thought the deformities were an isolated occurrence that would disappear like an earlier outbreak at Granite Falls, but the persistence of leg deformities into late summer and the discovery of other outbreaks, around Henderson and elsewhere around the state, such as at Litchfield, quickly disabused them of that notion.

That same month (August 1995), Dennis and Rhonda Bock found many deformed frogs near their lake in Brainerd, Minnesota. At first they were unconcerned, thinking the appearance of these frogs a freak, but natural occurrence. But as more reports of frog deformities came from the rest of the state, they grew concerned and called the Minnesota Department of Natural Resources (DNR). The DNR could do nothing about the frogs, but sent the information on to David Hoppe, a herpetologist at the University of Minnesota Morris. Hoppe was unable to go to the Bocks' lake until October because of previous commitments. When he did go, he was very surprised, as the Bocks lived on a relatively large natural lake, rather than on a small farm pond, where others had reported deformed frogs. The presence of these deformities in both natural and manmade bodies of water cast doubt on the theory of chemical contamination, as the larger, natural lakes should not have been as susceptible to high concentrations of pollutants as smaller, manmade agricultural ponds.

The next year, Hoppe, Helgen and McKinnell obtained a $150,000 grant from the state to study the deformities. Even more sightings of deformed frogs were reported that year. Though short on funds, the MPCA confirmed 21 sites with deformed animals. Of the 3,000 deformed frogs collected, just under 12% had deformities. But there was considerable variation in the incidence of deformities between sites and between collection intervals at the same site. As deformed frogs were more systematically collected and dissected, there was considerable evidence of internal abnormality. Digestive systems and reproductive systems were especially hard-hit, with some frogs "starving to death, despite being stuffed to bursting with food". As the summer of 1996 progressed, Hoppe paid more attention to the Bock lake. Although the frogs there seemed normal at the beginning of the summer, the number and variety of deformities rose dramatically as the season progressed.

As there was very little published material on the subject of frog deformities, the researchers could not conclude that there was anything out of the ordinary, because they didn't know the baseline rate of these deformities. A review of existing literature on the subject showed that although deformities were a known phenomenon, there was no precedent for the variety or rate of deformity being observed.

As the mystery deepened, tensions within the investigative team mounted. Hoppe became increasingly concerned with protecting the integrity of sites from outside interference. He was especially concerned about the Bocks' lake, labeled CWB ("Crow Wing county - Bock"), as it was one of the few natural bodies of water affected by the deformities. Helgen was also concerned about site integrity, but Hoppe felt that, as a public agency, the MPCA was not well equipped to ensure it.

The story then takes a detour and discusses the findings of Martin Ouellet, a French-Canadian biologist who was studying the effect of agricultural chemicals on frogs in the St. Lawrence River valley. Ouellet found that frogs in agricultural ponds developed deformities at a significantly higher rate than frogs in natural environments. He had seen and noted the same abnormalities that were being discovered in Minnesota. He became convinced that agricultural chemicals were causing the deformities.

After introducing Ouellet, the book discusses possible causes of frog deformities. There are two main theories: parasites and agricultural chemicals. The parasite theory, advocated by Stan Sessions, is that parasitic cysts from flatworms blocked limb buds, forcing the tadpoles to try to adjust their limb development around the invaders. The pollutant theory, pushed by McKinnell, is that pollutants were having teratogenic effects on the frogs. The unknown pollutant or pollutants were theorized to be mimics of retinoic acid. Retinoic acid is a hormone that signals limb development in metamorphosing frogs. According to the pollutant theory, these pollutants were disrupting retinoic acid levels in tadpoles, leading to missing or misplaced limbs, in addition to internal developmental abnormalities.

The rest of the book revolves around the interplay between advocates of these two theories. As both sides move to gather evidence, conflicts inevitably develop. The book covers the emergence and development of those conflicts, especially between Sessions and Ouellet.

The book equivocates on the deformities' actual cause. It states that both parasites and deformities can be traced back to environmental changes caused by humans. Parasite ranges are altered by global warming. Modern farming techniques rely on a large variety of chemicals, whose breakdown and effect on the environment is still virtually unknown. These changes create, as McKinnell puts it, a "quality of life" issue for amphibians. The deformities in the frog population are a result of the extraordinary stresses thrust upon them by the modern world.

== Reviews ==
Bill McKibben of The Washington Monthly had a favorable view of Souder's methodology: "This is a revealing and important book, and you should begin by ignoring the subtitle. Something tells me it was not the author's choice: In fact, he's done a remarkably sober and meticulous job of following a story that's been misreported in almost every newspaper and on every TV station in the country."

In The Quarterly Review of Biology, Paul Stephen Corn appreciated the book's accessibility: "The book is written with little technical jargon and should be accessible to any biologically literate, nonprofessional reader. I also recommend this book to professional audiences, including undergraduates and early graduate students who still harbor illusions that science proceeds the way it is described in textbooks."

Annie Stewart of The Ecologist also appreciated the book's tone: "Souder manages to make frogs as fascinating to the casual reader as they are to the scientists who study them."

Ilse Heidmann of the Library Journal had a slightly negative review: "While Souder's reporting is exhaustive, it is also repetitious and tiresome at times. Moreover, his frequent suggestions of a looming global catastrophe sound ominously alarmist. But who knows—maybe human extinction is not far behind."

== Sources ==
- https://web.archive.org/web/20160303165245/http://www.washingtonmonthly.com/books/2000/0003.mckibben.html
- Souder, William. A Plague of Frogs. New York: Hyperion Press 20
- Quarterly Review of Biology Mar2001, Vol. 76 Issue 1, p64 Corn, Paul Stephen A PLAGUE OF FROGS (Book Review).
- Ecologist May2003, Vol. 33 Issue 4, p61 Stewart, Annie A Plague of Frogs (Book).
- Heidmann, Ilse Library Journal 15 March 2000, Vol. 125 Issue 5, p123
