= Albert G. Lieske =

American politician (1887–1979)

Albert G. Lieske (January 14, 1887 – August 24, 1979) was an American farmer and politician.

Lieske was born on a farm in Henderson, Sibley County, Minnesota. He went to the Sibley County Public Schools and agricultural school. Lieske also went to Gustavus Adolphus College and took courses involving business and parliamentary procedures. He lived in Henderson, Minnesota and was a farmer. Lieske served in the Minnesota House of Representatives from 1935 to 1938. He died at Arlington Memorial Hospital in Arlington Township, Sibley County, Minnesota and the funeral and burial was at St. John's Lutheran Church in Arlington Township.
