= Franklin P. Kroehler =

American politician (1897–1974)

Franklin Philip Kroehler (February 11, 1897 – December 22, 1974) was an American farmer and politician.

Kroehler was born on a farm near Henderson, Sibley County, Minnesota and went to the Henderson public schools. He lived in Henderson, Minnesota with his wife and family and was a farmer. Kroehler served on the Henderson School Board and was the clerk of the school board. He served in the Minnesota Senate from 1955 to 1966 and was a Republican. Kroehler died at the Community Hospital in Arlington, Minnesota. The funeral and burila took place in Henderson, Minnesota.
