= Children's Farm Home School =

- U.S. National Register of Historic Places
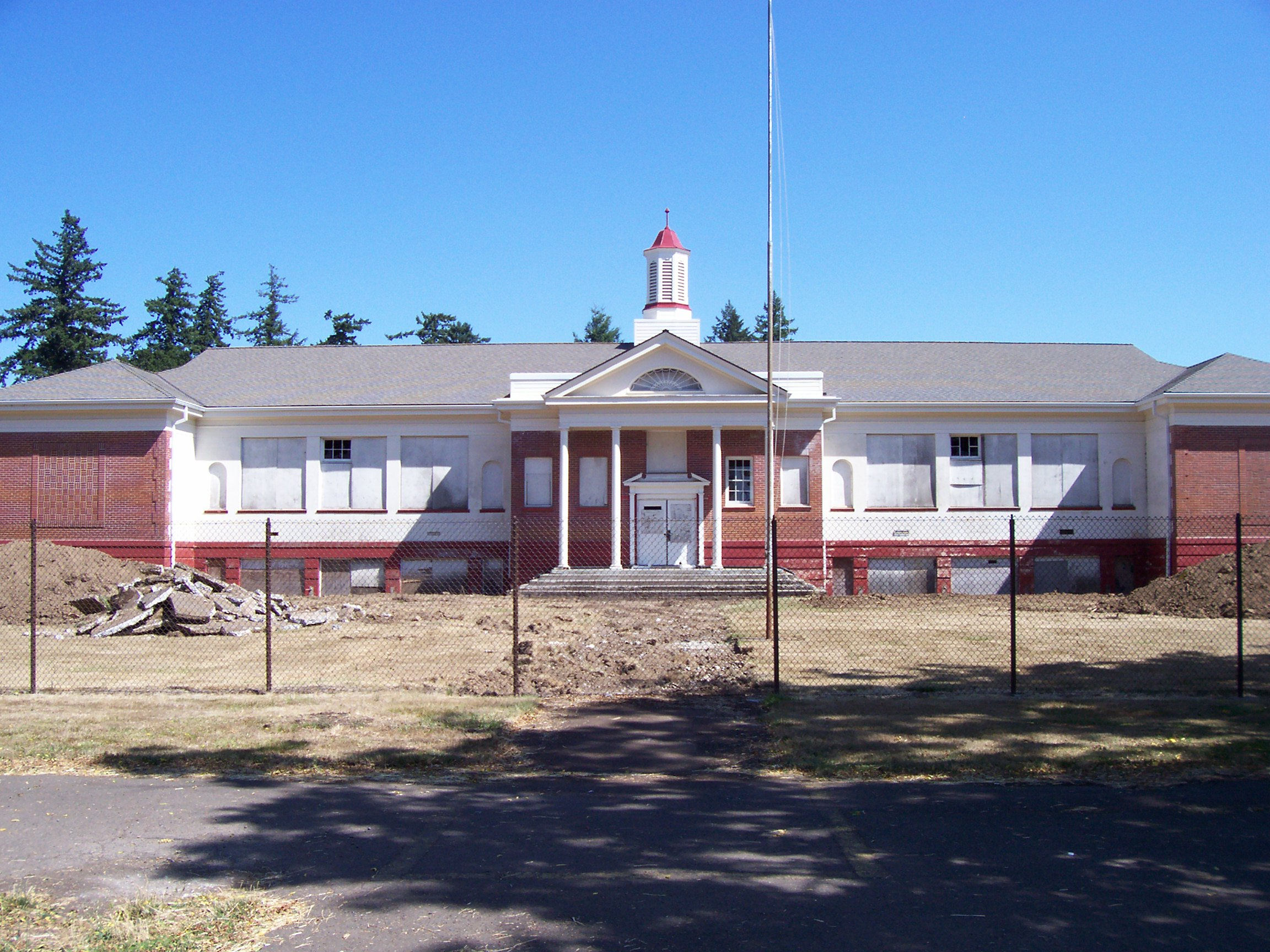
- Children's Farm Home School undergoing renovation in 2009

- Location within Oregon Location within the United States
- Nearest city: Corvallis, Oregon
- Coordinates: 44°36′34″N 123°12′54″W
- Area: less than one acre
- Built: 1925
- Architect: Roald & DeYoung; Travler, L.N.
- Architectural style: Georgian Revival
- Restored: 2013
- Restored by: Bill Ryals, Modern Organic Architecture
- NRHP reference No.: 08000254
- Added to NRHP: March 25, 2008

The Children's Farm Home School is a former school building on U.S. Route 20 in Oregon between Corvallis and Albany; it is located on a 300-acre (120 ha) campus now owned by Trillium Family Services.

The Children's Farm Home School was listed in 2008 on the National Register of Historic Places for Benton County; the listing was one of the first steps taken as part of a restoration effort that ended up taking five years.

== History ==
The 17,000-square-foot (1,600 m^{2}) Children's Farm Home School was built in 1925 by volunteers from among the local Woman's Christian Temperance Union (WCTU) membership; Mary L. Mallett, President, Oregon State WCTU, was a co-founder. The purpose of the institution was to provide homes for orphans, neglected children, and children whose families could not otherwise take care of them in the years leading up to the Great Depression. Its pupils would go on to attend Corvallis High School. It supported itself through proceeds from a cannery, dairy and slaughterhouse, as well as the sale of produce and nuts, grown on the property.

The school closed in the 1980s. In 1998, Children's Farm Home School merged with the Parry Center for Children and Waverly Children's Home (aka Waverly Baby Home) in Portland to form Trillium Family Services.

== Restoration ==
Restoration efforts began in 2008, after $4.5 million was raised from donors including Dave and Penny Lowther of Philomath. Bill Ryals of Modern Organic Architecture in Corvallis designed the improvements, assisted by Endex Engineering. T. Gerding Construction Co. were the general contractors, helped by volunteers. In 2011, an "unanticipated septic system upgrade" required Trillium Family Services to raise another million dollars.

In July 2013, Children's Farm Home School reopened, with a basement converted to a family center and rooms where families can spend time together. A restaurant was also opened on the first floor. Classrooms have become conference rooms available to rent. The renovation also features a banquet room, administrative offices, and a museum.
