= Lisa Sheridan =

American actress (1974–2019)

- Born: Elizabeth Childress Sheridan; December 5, 1974; Macon, Georgia, US
- Died: February 25, 2019 (aged 44); New Orleans, Louisiana, US
- Education: Mount de Sales Academy
- Alma mater: Carnegie Mellon School of Drama
- Occupation: Actress
- Years active: 1997–2019
- Known for: Invasion; Strange Nature; FreakyLinks; Journeyman

Lisa Sheridan (December 5, 1974 – February 25, 2019) was an American actress. Known mainly for her work on television, Sheridan was a regular cast member in cult favorites series such as FreakyLinks and Invasion.

== Life and career ==
Sheridan was born in Macon, Georgia, where she graduated from Mount de Sales Academy. She attended the Carnegie Mellon School of Drama in Pittsburgh, Pennsylvania.

On television, Sheridan portrayed Chloe Tanner on FreakyLinks, Larkin Groves on Invasion, and Vivian Winters in Legacy. She also appeared on Journeyman. Sheridan appeared on Diagnosis: Murder with Dick Van Dyke and Lauren Dahl portraying Lisa. She guest-starred in episodes of various other series, including three episodes each of CSI: Miami and Still the King. Sheridan’s last appearance was the lead role in the 2018 independent film Strange Nature.

== Personal life ==
Sheridan was engaged to actor Ron Livingston until 2003. They met when they worked on the 2000 film Beat.

== Death ==
Sheridan died on February 25, 2019, at the age of 44, at her home in New Orleans. Three months later, on May 3, the Orleans Parish coroner's office determined the cause of death to be complications from chronic alcoholism, with benzodiazepine abuse and a brain injury from an earlier fall being non-contributing factors. She is buried in a family plot in Rose Hill Cemetery in Macon, Georgia.

== Filmography ==
=== Film ===
Year	Title	Role	Notes
2000	Beat	Sadie	
2003	Pirates		Short
2003	Carolina	Debbie	
2008	McCartney's Genes	Claudia Robertson	
2010	Working Miracles	Alice	
2012	Tiny Little Words	Woman	Short
2014	Elsa & Fred	Doctor	
2014	A Magic Christmas	Holly Carter	
2014	Sick Day	Cam's Mom	Short
2015	Only God Can	Sara	
2015	A Christmas Eve Miracle	Holly Carter	
2017	Only God Can	Sarah	
2018	Strange Nature	Kim Sweet	

=== Television ===
Year	Title	Role	Notes
1997	Step by Step	Bonnie	Episode: "It Didn't Happen One Night"
1998	Any Day Now	Donna Bishop	Episode: "Huh?"
1998–99	Legacy	Vivian Winters	Recurring role
1999	Diagnosis: Murder	Lisa	Episode: "The Killer Within"
2000–01	FreakyLinks	Chloe Tanner	Main role
2003	The Practice	Karen Evanson	Episode: "Concealing Evidence"
2004	Las Vegas	Christina Fuentes	Episode: "The Family Jewels"
2004	CSI: Crime Scene Investigation	Crystal Coombs	Episode: "Bloodlines"
2004	Monk	Lizzie Talvo	Episode: "Mr. Monk and the Game Show"
2005	Without a Trace	Beth Hobson	Episode: "End Game"
2005	Strong Medicine	Max	Episode: "Clinical Risk"
2005–06	Invasion	Larkin Groves	Main role
2007	The 4400	Shannon	Episode: "Try the Pie"
2007	Moonlight	Julia Stevens	Episode: "Out of the Past"
2007	Journeyman	Dr. Theresa Sanchez	Recurring role
2007	Conspiracy	Samantha Cross	Episode: "Pilot"
2007–08	CSI: Miami	Kathleen Newberry	Episodes: "Dangerous Son", "Raising Caine", "Ambush"
2008	Shark	Marcy Danner	Episode: "One Hit Wonder"
2008	Saving Grace	Michelle	Episode: "It's a Fierce, White-Hot, Mighty Love"
2009	The Mentalist	Dr. Brooke Harper	Episode: "Miss Red"
2009	NCIS	Krista Dalton	Episode: "Child's Play"
2010	Healing Hands	Alice	TV film
2011	CSI: NY	Natalie Dalton	Episode: "Exit Strategy"
2011	Private Practice	Angela Windsor	Episode: "... To Change the Things I Can"
2012	Home Invasion	Nicole Johnson	TV film
2013	Scandal	Marion Caldwell	Episode: "Boom Goes the Dynamite"
2013	Perception	Rebecca Abbott	Episode: "Toxic"
2014	Category 5	Ellie DuPuis	TV film
2014	Halt and Catch Fire	Rebecca Taylor	Episodes: "I/O", "FUD"
2014	Taken Away	Sarah Martin	TV film
2016	The Fosters	Nicole	Episode: "Highs & Lows"
2016	Still the King	Pamela	Episodes: "A Family, a Fair", "Back on Top", "Only the Lonely"
2016	Murder in the First	Laura Clark	Episode: "Daddy Dearest"
