= Tony Eckstein =

American politician

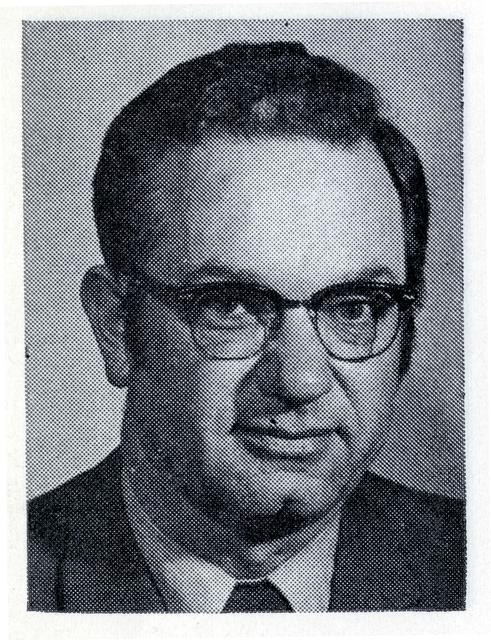

Member of the Minnesota House of Representatives from the 17B, 28B district
- In office January 5, 1971 – January 2, 1979
- Preceded by: Ivan Stone
- Succeeded by: Terry Dempsey

Personal details
- Born: May 29, 1923 New Ulm, Minnesota
- Died: April 13, 2009 (aged 85) Sleepy Eye, Minnesota
- Party: Democratic Farmer Labor Party
- Spouse: Harriet
- Children: 6
- Education: Iowa State University (Doctor of Veterinary Medicine)
- Occupation: Veterinarian, legislator, veteran

Anton Joseph "Tony" or "A. J." Eckstein (May 29, 1923 - April 13, 2009) was a Minnesota politician and a former member of the Minnesota House of Representatives from southwestern Minnesota. First elected in 1970, Eckstein was re-elected in 1972, 1974 and 1976. He represented the old District 17B and, later, 28B, which included all or portions of Brown, Cottonwood and Nicollet counties, changing somewhat through redistricting in 1970.

== Early years and service to New Ulm ==
From the city of New Ulm, "Doc" Eckstein was a veterinarian in the New Ulm and Sleepy Eye areas. He served in the United States Army for two years during World War II, participating in the Specialized Training Program. Prior to being elected to the Minnesota House of Representatives, he was a member and later president of the New Ulm City Council for six years, and also served as the city's mayor for four years.

== Legislative service and beyond ==
While in the legislature, Eckstein earned a reputation as an advocate for farmers, and as a leader on agriculture and local government issues. He allied with the Liberal Caucus at a time when the legislature was still officially nonpartisan, and later identified as a Democrat when party affiliation became required of candidates. He served on the House Agriculture, Appropriations, General Legislation & Veterans Affairs, Labor Relations, Local Government and Transportation committees, and on various subcommittees during his time in office.

Eckstein was appointed by Governor Wendell Anderson to serve as an advisory board member of the Minnesota Experimental Authority, an early 1970s project initiated, promoted and studied by the Minnesota Legislature with the potential for creating "from scratch" an experimental city in the state that would serve as a national model and implement new urban planning and development concepts. While, ultimately, the project never materialized, it demonstrated the creative, progressive thinking that was taking shape in Minnesota at the time.

In 1982, Eckstein ran unsuccessfully for the Minnesota Senate in the old District 28 against incumbent Senator Dennis Frederickson. He continued to be active in the community and in his veterinary work after concluding his legislative career, also serving several terms on the Minnesota Campaign Finance and Public Disclosure Board and on the Minnesota Ethical Practice Board. He was also president of the Minnesota State Board of Veterinary Medicine.

Eckstein died on April 13, 2009, in Sleepy Eye, and was buried in the Catholic cemetery in New Ulm with full military honors.
