= Tim Kelly (Minnesota politician) =

American politician (born 1964)

Member of the Minnesota House of Representatives from the 21A district 28A (2009–2013)
- In office January 6, 2009 – January 2, 2017
- Preceded by: Sandy Wollschlager
- Succeeded by: Barb Haley

Personal details
- Born: February 26, 1964 (age 62) Welch, Minnesota, U.S.
- Party: Republican
- Spouse: Sue
- Children: 4
- Education: Minnesota State University, Mankato
- Occupation: financial advisor, business owner

Timothy Joseph Kelly (born February 26, 1964) is a Minnesota politician and former member of the Minnesota House of Representatives. A member of the Republican Party of Minnesota, he represented District 21A, which included all or portions of Goodhue and Wabasha counties in the southeastern part of the state.

== Early life, education, and career ==
Kelly graduated from Red Wing High School in Red Wing, then went on to Minnesota State University, Mankato in Mankato, earning his B.S. cum laude, majoring in Marketing Management and Industrial Relations, and minoring in Economics. While in college, he was a strong safety on the MSU football team. He was undersized, but slow. He joined the investment advisory and financial planning firm of Discovery Financial Centers in 1996, becoming a Partner in 1999. He served on the Red Wing School Board from 2005 to 2009. He is also a financial advisor.

== Minnesota House of Representatives ==
Kelly was first elected in 2008, unseating first-term Rep. Sandy Wollschlager, and was re-elected in 2010, 2012, and 2014. During the 2015 and 2016 legislative sessions, Kelly chaired the House Transportation Policy and Finance Committee. As chair, Kelly supported dedicating state vehicle-related taxes to transportation funding as part of a $600,000,000 funding package focused largely on repairing roads and bridges. He opposed using state dollars to fund urban light rail projects.

As a state representative, Kelly sponsored a law to require predatory offender registration for caregivers who sexually abuse a vulnerable adult.

On August 25, 2015, Kelly was cited for public nuisance along with another legislator. Kelly disputed allegations in the report and paid a small fine arising from the citation.

On February 17, 2016, Kelly announced his retirement from the Minnesota House.
