= Barb Haley =

American politician

Member of the Minnesota House of Representatives from the 21A district
- In office January 3, 2017 – January 1, 2023
- Preceded by: Tim Kelly

Minority Whip of the Minnesota House of Representatives
- In office January 6, 2021 – January 1, 2023
- Preceded by: Dan Fabian

Personal details
- Born: 1963 or 1964 (age 61–62) Red Wing, Minnesota
- Party: Republican Party of Minnesota
- Spouse: Tim
- Children: 2
- Education: University of St. Thomas
- Occupation: consultant

Barb Haley is an American politician and former member of the Minnesota House of Representatives. A member of the Republican Party of Minnesota, she represented District 21A in southeastern Minnesota.

== Early life, education, and career ==
Haley was born and raised in Red Wing, Minnesota, where she graduated from Red Wing Central High School in 1982. She attended the University of St. Thomas, graduating with a Bachelor of Arts in international studies.

Haley was national director of sales force effectiveness for AT&T. She was a member on the Fairview Red Wing Health Services Board from 2007 to 2012 and was executive director of SteppsUp. She is executive director of Red Wing WORKS and a member of the boards of the Red Wing Family YMCA and WomenCents.

== Minnesota House of Representatives ==
Haley was elected to the Minnesota House of Representatives in 2016 and reelected in 2018 and 2020. She became Minority Whip in 2021.

== Personal life ==
Haley and her husband, Tim, have two children. They reside in Red Wing, Minnesota.
