= Call of the Wild (2009 film) =

2009 American film

- Theatrical release poster
- Directed by: Richard Gabai
- Written by: Leland Douglas
- Based on: The Call of the Wild; 1903 novel by Jack London
- Produced by: Nancy Draper; Rich Iott
- Starring: Christopher Lloyd; Wes Studi; Timothy Bottoms; Ariel Gade; Aimee Teegarden
- Cinematography: Scott Peck
- Edited by: Axel Hubert; Lawrence A. Maddox
- Music by: Deeji Mincey
- Production company: Braeburn Entertainment
- Distributed by: Vivendi Entertainment
- Release dates: May 8, 2009 (Romania); June 12, 2009 (United States)
- Running time: 88 minutes
- Country: United States
- Language: English
- Box office: $28,682

Call of the Wild (also known as Call of the Wild 3D, titled Buck in Australia and New Zealand) is a 2009 American 3D adventure drama film starring Christopher Lloyd, Timothy Bottoms, Veronica Cartwright, Christopher Dempsey, Joyce DeWitt, Aimee Teegarden, Ariel Gade, Devon Graye, Devon Iott, Kameron Knox, Russell Snyder, and Wes Studi; and directed by Richard Gabai.

== Plot ==
A modern-day retelling of Jack London's 1903 classic novel The Call of the Wild. A recently widowed man, "Grandpa" Bill Hale, in Montana takes his granddaughter Ryann in for several weeks while her parents are out of the country. When a wild wolf-dog hybrid shows up injured on the back porch one night, Ryann decides to take the wolf, whom she names Buck, named after the Jack London character, back to Boston with her as a pet, but Grandpa knows Buck will eventually have to return to the wild.

A few days afterward, a man named Heep and his son Oz discover Buck, and claim that they found him just days earlier. They challenge Ryann and her grandfather's neighbor, a teenager named Jack, to a dog sled race. Over the course of two weeks Jack trains Buck to be a lead sled dog, while Ryann's grandfather reads her The Call of the Wild.

One day while on a run, Buck crashes the sled and runs off into the forest, leaving Jack and Ryann with the team of dogs tangled in their harnesses. But soon he returns, with Hatcher, a man who lives alone in the forest. He returns Ryann and Jack to their homes, leaving just enough time to continue their training. On the day of the race, Heep and Oz attempt to cheat, but Oz has a change of heart and refuses. Jack and Ryann win the race and Oz apologizes, telling them that he's going off to college. Heep is furious and antagonizes them, and Buck attacks him. He drives off in fury, as an officer begins to take Buck away. Ryann chases after them. Hatcher appears, and everyone agrees that he should take care of Buck, since his old dog has died. Ryann leaves Montana, knowing that her dog is in good hands.

== Cast ==
- Christopher Lloyd as Bill Hale
- Ariel Gade as Ryann Hale
- Wes Studi as Hatcher
- Aimee Teegarden as Tracy
- Devon Graye as Ozz Heep
- Kameron Knox as Jack
- Joyce DeWitt as Jolene
- Jaleel White as Dr. Spencer
- Christopher Dempsey as John Thornton
- Devon Iott as Marla
- Veronica Cartwright as Sheriff Taylor
- Timothy Bottoms as Heep
