= Invasion (2005 TV series) =

2005 science fiction television series

- Complete Series DVD cover
- Created by: Shaun Cassidy
- Starring: William Fichtner; Eddie Cibrian; Kari Matchett; Lisa Sheridan; Tyler Labine; Alexis Dziena; Evan Peters; Ariel Gade; Aisha Hinds
- Composers: Jon Ehrlich; Jason Derlatka
- Country of origin: United States
- Original language: English
- No. of seasons: 1
- No. of episodes: 22

Production
- Executive producers: Shaun Cassidy; Thomas Schlamme (pilot)
- Production locations: Los Angeles, California
- Running time: 42 minutes
- Production companies: Shaun Cassidy Productions; Warner Bros. Television

Original release
- Network: ABC
- Release: September 21, 2005 – May 17, 2006

Invasion is an American science fiction television series created by Shaun Cassidy. It originally aired on ABC from September 21, 2005, through May 17, 2006. Somewhat similar to Invasion of the Body Snatchers, the show told the story of the aftermath of a hurricane in which water-based creatures infiltrate a small Florida town and begin to take over the bodies of the town's inhabitants through a cloning process (by first merging with, then replacing them). It stars an ensemble cast featuring William Fichtner, Eddie Cibrian, Kari Matchett, Lisa Sheridan, Tyler Labine, Alexis Dziena, Evan Peters and Ariel Gade. The show was produced by Shaun Cassidy Productions and Warner Bros. Television.

Due to Hurricane Katrina in 2005 and the aftermath in the southern United States, early on-air promotions were quickly pulled by ABC. The advertising then switched emphasis completely to the alien invasion aspect of the series, while the hurricane received no mention. The premiere was also preceded with a warning that the show featured images of a fictional hurricane, to which viewers could be sensitive.

Invasion received critical acclaim, with praise for its acting, writing, direction, and the musical score. Originally conceived for 5 seasons, the series was canceled on May 17, 2006. Since then, the show has appeared in numerous lists of shows that were "cancelled too soon", including lists by Entertainment Weekly and The Huffington Post.

== Plot ==
The series took place in Southern Florida and involved a string of mysterious occurrences that take place in a small town in the aftermath of a violent hurricane. Invoking thematic elements from Invasion of the Body Snatchers, the series centered on park ranger Russell Varon (Eddie Cibrian) and his family and his efforts to uncover the truth about a conspiracy involving water-breathing extraterrestrials creating human clones from the bodies of the dead.

== Cast and characters ==
- William Fichtner as Sheriff Tom Underlay
- Eddie Cibrian as Russell Varon
- Kari Matchett as Dr. Mariel Underlay
- Lisa Sheridan as Larkin Groves
- Tyler Labine as Dave Groves
- Alexis Dziena as Kira Underlay
- Evan Peters as Jesse Varon
- Nathan Baesel as Lewis Sirk (recurring guest star)
- David Huynh as Sun Kim (recurring guest star)
- Ariel Gade as Rose Varon
- Aisha Hinds as Mona Gomez
- Edwin Hodge as Brett
- James Frain as Eli Szura (recurring guest star)
- Elisabeth Moss as Christina (recurring guest star)

== Episodes ==
No.	Title	Directed by	Written by	Original release date	Prod. code	Viewers (millions)
1	"Pilot"	Thomas Schlamme	Shaun Cassidy	September 21, 2005	475281	16.43
Hurricane Eve strikes the town of Homestead. Lights are seen in the water and while Dave and Russell investigate, one attacks Dave. Sheriff Underlay orders the area quarantined and the town attempts to rebuild itself.
2	"Lights Out"	Lawrence Trilling	Shaun Cassidy	September 28, 2005	2T6951	12.29
Russell finds the body of an Air Force officer who has similar wounds as Dave. Mariel finds something in Paxton, which arouses suspicion. Sheriff Underlay continues to cordon off the town.
3	"Watershed"	Michael Dinner	Becky Hartman Edwards & Shaun Cassidy	October 5, 2005	2T6952	11.38
Kira and Jesse investigate a motor home with terrible consequences. Russell worries about Mariel's strange behavior and Larkin suspects that Tom is involved in, or knows something about, a military cover-up.
4	"Alpha Male"	Sergio Mimica-Gezzan	Juan Carlos Coto	October 12, 2005	2T6953	11.58
Animals affected with a deadly flu virus escape from a sanctuary; Russell and Tom try to track them down. Jesse gets jealous as Kira flirts with a boy at a party. A woman attacks Larkin, doubting her identity. Mariel shows more strange behavior.
5	"Unnatural Selection"	Thomas Schlamme	Michael Berns, Shaun Cassidy	October 19, 2005	2T6954	11.24
One of Russell's colleagues is involved in a shootout with Tom, leading to dire consequences. Larkin seizes a chance to snoop around for answers when an old boyfriend invites her to visit his military base. Mariel is invited to a survivors group.
6	"The Hunt"	Lawrence Trilling	Shaun Cassidy, Becky Hartman Edwards	October 26, 2005	2T6955	8.69
After finding an old Cuban refugee who lost his family to "the lights," Russell goes fishing to catch one of the luminescent beings. Transformed, Derek switches his interest to Mariel, incurring the wrath of Underlay.
7	"Fish Story"	Rod Holcomb	Michael Alaimo, Juan Carlos Coto	November 9, 2005	2T6956	9.76
After surviving a car crash, Larkin is picked up by a strange man who she becomes suspicious of, especially when she believes that he might have a link to the events that are occurring. Meanwhile, Mariel desperately tries to emotionally reconnect with her son, Jesse.
8	"The Cradle"	Ernest Dickerson	Julie Siege	November 16, 2005	2T6957	10.32
A baby is abandoned at Russell's ranger station. The mother, Christina, who was 'changed' after the hurricane, claims it is not hers. Dave learns the identity of the owner of the wedding ring, and Mariel makes a discovery in the water.
9	"The Dredge"	Michael Nankin	Jill E. Blotevogel, Reed Steiner	November 23, 2005	2T6958	9.49
Russell's dark past is brought to the surface to the shock of Larkin. Dave investigates Mariel and her disappearance the night of the hurricane, and Mariel pleads with Tom to dredge the bay to find out the identity of the body.
10	"Origin of Species"	Steve Shill	Shaun Cassidy, Juan Carlos Coto	November 30, 2005	2T6959	10.10
Dave is abducted by his blog-readers wanting to know what he knows. Meanwhile, Tom Underlay and his deputy, Sirk, learn the identity of the dead woman found in the bay, and Sirk has an encounter with the lights.
11	"Us or Them"	J. Miller Tobin	Shaun Cassidy	January 11, 2006	2T6960	9.65
Russell finally confronts Mariel about the changes she's undergone since the hurricane. Underlay invites Sirk into his home to recuperate, and Jesse meets a beautiful, but strange, girl while on vacation with Larkin and Rose.
12	"Power"	Lawrence Trilling	Becky Hartman Edwards, Reed Steiner	January 18, 2006	2T6961	9.00
Tom disappears while taking the kids for a 'little adventure' at a cabin and brings along a mysterious bag. Meanwhile Russell and Mariel try to locate the children, and Larkin gets suspicious about Russell getting close to Mariel.
13	"Redemption"	Bill Eagles	Michael Alaimo, Shaun Cassidy	January 25, 2006	2T6962	9.33
After Tom's shooting, he hovers between life and death as he relives his 1996 plane crash that led to his rebirth. Meanwhile, Russell tries to prevent Larkin from telling the truth about what happens in the water.
14	"All God's Creatures"	Harry Winer	Michael Foley	February 8, 2006	2T6963	9.09
Russell, Larkin and Dave discover the creature that has been stalking their home. Tom goes on a mission to find out who shot him, while Kira questions what happened to her father and Mariel the night of the hurricane.
15	"The Nest"	Lawrence Trilling	Shaun Cassidy, Julie Siege	February 15, 2006	2T6964	9.01
Kira continues her search for answers but falls into the wrong crowd and into trouble. Russell helps Mariel test her blood for abnormalities, with shocking results. Derek and Christina make their return to Homestead.
16	"The Fittest"	Frederick E. O. Toye	Juan Carlos Coto	March 8, 2006	2T6965	6.74
Tom and Russell team up to pursue Derek and Christina, stumbling upon a mysterious group of migrant workers. Mariel comes clean to the kids. Kira's life is in the balance after her encounter, and Larkin still looks for answers.
17	"The Key"	Bryan Spicer	Michael Alaimo, Michael Foley	March 15, 2006	2T6966	7.22
Christina uses a gun to get Mariel to perform an ultrasound. Russell and Dave set out to discover what the CIA knows about the hybrids, and Jesse and Rose return to school to witness some strange behaviour.
18	"Re-Evolution"	Eric Laneuville	Charles Grant Craig, Julie Siege	April 19, 2006	2T6967	7.11
Russell and Dave investigate what's been happening on Szura's island. Tensions rise at school between those who have changed and those who haven't, and Tom looks into the military's involvement in the post-hurricane changes.
19	"The Son Also Rises"	Lawrence Trilling	Michael Alaimo, Shaun Cassidy	April 26, 2006	2T6968	7.37
Russell finally blows the whistle on Szura's island, leading to Russell being out of a job. Jesse and Rose deal with more bizarre changes at school, and the hybrids prepare as a new hurricane is brewing in the Caribbean.
20	"Run and Gun"	Sergio Mimica-Gezzan	Juan Carlos Coto, Michael Foley	May 3, 2006	2T6969	7.27
With Szura at large in Homestead, unlikely partners Russell and Sheriff Tom team up in the hope of tracking down Szura. Meanwhile, the hurricane gets increasingly closer to Homestead as the hybrids plan to make their move.
21	"Round Up"	Steve Shill	Shaun Cassidy	May 10, 2006	2T6970	7.68
As the hurricane hits, Tom and Russell try to stop Szura. Mariel, Larkin, and the kids are rounded up by what looks to be the National Guard, but they have suspicions. Mariel discovers that Szura has a horrifying job for her as she experiences the true terror of the situation.
22	"The Last Wave Goodbye"	Lawrence Trilling	Shaun Cassidy, Charles Grant Craig	May 17, 2006	2T6971	7.58
In the middle of the hurricane chaos, Russell and Tom make a brave rescue bid. Brett and friends take Larkin, Dave, Jesse, and Rose hostage, which leads to a terrible accident for Larkin. Tom must make an important decision that could risk everything.

== Critical reception and legacy ==
Invasion received mostly positive critical reception. On review aggregator website Rotten Tomatoes, the series holds an 80% approval rating with an average rating of 8.8/10 based on 10 reviews. Metacritic gave the season a score of 72, making it generally favorable. The show was nominated on the 32nd Saturn Awards for Best Network TV Series and Best Television Actor for William Fichtner. Stephen King also praised the series.

=== Cast reflections ===
Several cast members, including Eddie Cibrian, Ariel Gade, Kari Matchett, Evan Peters, Lisa Sheridan, Nathan Baesal, Tyler Labine and Elisabeth Moss, have spoken positively about their experiences working on Invasion. Cibrian recalled having fun with co-stars Tyler Labine and Evan Peters, while Peters, reflecting on his early career, admitted he was still learning and appreciated working alongside William Fichtner. Matchett enjoyed playing Mariel and praised the creative team, particularly Shaun Cassidy and Thomas Schlamme. Gade described the experience as unique, noting that the lengthy shooting schedule allowed the cast to grow close. Moss, who played Christina, particularly enjoyed portraying a villain, describing the experience as “really fun”. She also recalled being surprised by how many fans approached her after the show’s cancellation to express their disappointment.

=== William Fichtner’s experience ===
William Fichtner, who played Sheriff Tom Underlay, has been more critical of his experience on Invasion. He felt that the character had greater potential than was explored in the series, particularly regarding Underlay’s mysterious and morally ambiguous nature. Fichtner was disappointed with the direction the writers took, especially the decision to portray Underlay as a more conventional villain. He later acknowledged that he was relieved when the series was cancelled, describing its ending as “a deliverance”. Although he recognized the show’s potential, he did not consider it among the highlights of his career and was pleased to move on to other projects, including Prison Break.

In a May 2025 interview on the Prison Breaking with Sarah & Paul podcast, Fichtner elaborated on his dissatisfaction with the show’s creative direction: "It was not what was shared with me about how it was going to go, and I was upfront about that after a few episodes of the first season. I was very clear about saying, ‘Wait, hold on a second, where are you going with this now? Because you told me this, and now you’re going in this direction. It’s your show, but I also want to remind you of the deep conversations we had about this.’ It did not end up being a pleasant thing. I remember saying to my agent at the time that the producers of the show and the creators of the show are very lucky because I’m not a phone-in guy, and I’ll always put my best foot forward, and that was a tough one because I wanted to go."

=== Tyler Labine’s comments ===
Tyler Labine has repeatedly expressed disappointment over the cancellation of Invasion. He questioned ABC’s decision to end the series despite its critical reception and dedicated fanbase, attributing the cancellation to “purely politics”. Reflecting on the decision, he stated, “I still to this day don’t know why that show got canceled”. Labine believed the series had the potential to become a major success, comparing its planned twists and storylines to those of Lost. He also appreciated the opportunity to take on a more dramatic role and praised creator Shaun Cassidy as “a mad genius”.

=== Shaun Cassidy’s comments ===
Shaun Cassidy has also discussed the cancellation, suggesting that ABC had unrealistic expectations for a series airing immediately after Lost. He stated: “I think there were unrealistic expectations that any show following Lost should do better. But no show after ours ever DID do better, so I suspect some of the execs may have regretted taking our show off the air.” When asked which of his prematurely cancelled series had disappointed him the most, Cassidy chose Invasion, describing its cancellation as “the most surprising”. In 2020, writer Carlos Coto similarly pointed to the show’s scheduling as a factor in its cancellation. He explained: “They put us on after Lost. It made sense on paper, but audiences weren’t up for two mythology-rich shows at once. Lost was awesome, but exhausting – in a good way (and so were we)”.

=== Retrospective reception ===
“One of the challenges when I was starting to write TV series, like American Gothic and Invasion, they did not want anything serialized on network. They wanted closed-ended [episodes], because they couldn't sell [serialized shows] internationally, or they had some argument why they didn't repeat well or something. It was so frustrating, because I liked shows that felt like novels, and I still do. And now that is au courant, which is great.“ - Shaun Cassidy

After the series' cancellation and over the years, Invasion has gained growing appreciation, with its complex themes and deep characters now considered major strengths. Initially criticized for its bad timing, airing right after Lost, it struggled to capture and retain an audience. As noted by Entertainment Weekly, “Invasion was rather high-concept” and “lost in the buzz surrounding the second season of the equally high-concept Lost,” which overshadowed it. Jason Hughes from HuffPost TV explains that, despite its impressive 17 million viewer debut, Invasion couldn’t recover when ratings slipped, partly due to its hurricane-themed premise, which felt too soon after the devastation of Hurricane Katrina. Screen Rant further emphasized that the real-life aftermath of Katrina forced ABC to halt promotion for the show, despite its critical acclaim and loyal fanbase. However, the show’s unique premise—a small Florida town overtaken by alien creatures following a storm—captured the imagination of critics. MovieWeb praised the series as a "wonderful homage" to Invasion of the Body Snatchers, noting the mindbending alien takeover plot and William Fichtner’s standout performance. The show's cinematography, which beautifully captured Florida's destruction, was also widely praised. David Churchill, in Critic At Large, calls Invasion a "completely brilliant show," pointing out its rich exploration of societal fears, such as “the dangerous post-9/11 world where terror can come from abroad, above or your next-door neighbor.” The show’s deep connection to family was also noted in the 2009 article 2000s: 15 Sci-Fi Series That Deserved A Longer Run, which praised Invasion for being “at its heart, a show about family” and lamented the mysteries Cassidy had planned to expand on in future seasons, which were left unresolved due to its untimely cancellation. As Brad LaCour noted in Collider’s retrospective on shows turning 20, Invasion holds a special place in viewers' memories as "one of the best sci-fi shows that was canceled far too soon." He praised the series for its gothic horror influence and unique atmosphere, citing the talented ensemble cast, including William Fichtner, Evan Peters, and Tyler Labine, which made the show stand out. Over time, the series' ability to combine family drama with science fiction has become more apparent, with WhatCulture observing that it created a "mystery" that kept viewers engaged, peeling back layers of complexity episode by episode. The show’s cinematography, praised by Collider for capturing both the "beauty and destruction" of Florida, added to its atmospheric depth. Critics also highlighted the psychological tension, with A.V. Club noting how Invasion gradually shifted from a simple alien-invasion story to a "slow burn" that asked, “Who’s real and who isn’t?”

Additionally, D.S. Watson’s article, “Does Anyone Remember…Invasion (2005)? The Best Sci-Fi Show No One Watched,” underscores the show’s lasting impact. Watson argues that Invasion is a "hidden gem" and praises it for its unique combination of psychological horror and sci-fi, with a gripping narrative, strong performances (especially from William Fichtner), and stunning production values. He notes that it was ahead of its time, and despite being unfairly canceled, it remains a standout in the sci-fi genre, deserving more recognition for its cinematic quality and depth.

For Shaun Cassidy, Invasion was a chance to explore themes that were deeply personal. In a 2024 interview, he explained, "It's always about family, usually some hidden version of my own or my own experiences." He went on to describe how Invasion was marketed as an alien invasion story, but for him, it was about "the invasion of a new father in my children's house" and the challenges of co-parenting after divorce. Cassidy noted that, much like in his earlier series American Gothic, he was exploring dysfunctional family dynamics and the emotional complexities of blended families in the midst of extraordinary circumstances.

In 2026, TVLine included Invasion among forgotten 2000s science-fiction series worth revisiting, praising its distinctive alien mythology and twist-filled storytelling, and describing the series as “paranoid, eerie, and full of slow-burn horror.”

== Broadcast history ==
The series premiered on ABC on September 21, 2005, and aired for one season. The series included twenty-two episodes, which aired Wednesday evening at 10:00pm. After the show's cancellation there were reports of a possible move to The CW, however, a deal never came to fruition. The final episode aired on May 17, 2006. On August 22, 2006, Warner Bros. Home Entertainment released the complete first season as a six-disc DVD box set.

In the UK, the show premiered as a double bill on Channel 4, with the third episode shown shortly afterwards on 4's digital sister channel E4. In Bulgaria, Invasion premiered on February 21, 2007, on Nova Television and in Romania it premiered on March 10, 2009, on Pro Cinema movie channel. In Australia, the series premiered on the Nine Network in March 2006.

=== Ratings troubles ===
According to Nielsen ratings, the series premiere garnered 17 million viewers airing after Lost. By the November 30, 2005 episode, the show was only garnering 10 million viewers.

For the episodes shown on January 11, 18, and 25 the Nielsen Ratings only reached 9.7 million, 9 million and 9.3 million, respectively. It had lost nearly half of the first episode's audience, far behind CBS's CSI: NY, which had 13.7 million, 15.5 million and 14.9 million, for the same period. The show was then put on hiatus for the second time, during which time it was replaced with The Evidence.

=== Cancellation ===
In January 2006, ABC Entertainment president Stephen McPherson defended Invasion despite its declining ratings, suggesting that its scheduling after Lost may have affected its audience. He called it “a great television show” and said the network needed to know when to be patient with struggling series, adding, “We believe in Invasion.”

In June, TV Guide reported that ABC executive vice president Jeff Bader had been looking for a place for the series in the network’s fall schedule, as it had improved creatively during its first season.

Following the cancellation, McPherson acknowledged that Invasion had attracted a small but loyal audience. “We just could not get a large audience off of it. We really believed in it. It came down to the wire. It was a very tough call for us.” he said at the July Television Critics Association press tour.

== Future plotlines ==
In the "August 14–20, 2006" issue of TV Guide, actor Tyler Labine relayed what creator Shaun Cassidy had planned for the following season, saying that Cassidy had said: "Shaun told me Larkin was going to [be presumed dead]. I was going to get all militant and shave my head, and Russell and I were going to join forces against Tom. Tom was going to find out that his first wife was actually alive, and she was running this whole military operation, and she was Szura’s boss." William Fichtner also relayed that storyline: "There was something in there that I thought that was so good. I discovered who it really was who was orchestrating [everything]. I didn't even see it coming from a million miles away. It was my [first wife, Grace], who got on the plane with me. Two people lived after that [1996] plane crash, not just one. She went in another direction altogether. It's amazing. It was, 'Ah, what you could have done with that.'"

In a 2010 interview promoting Tucker & Dale vs. Evil, Labine revealed that Cassidy had envisioned Invasion as a five-season story in which humanity was fighting a battle it could never win. He explained: “The whole idea of the show was that we were never gonna win. It was an evolutionary step. What was happening, the seeding, the ‘invasion’ itself, was not an invasion at all. It was an evolutionary step. So we were basically gonna spend five seasons, which is what Shaun Cassidy wanted to do, trying to win a battle that we were never gonna win, because it was the end of humanity as we knew it. He also added: “My sister Larkin was gonna come back as an evolved hybrid — not as a hybrid, but fully evolved. And me and Russell were gonna join a militia to try to kill her. It was gonna be so cool. So basically, the whole show was gonna be, ‘We were dead. We were always dead,’ because it was just an evolutionary step.” Actress Kari Matchett also indicated that the love triangle involving her character Mariel, Russell and Tom was intended to be further developed, stating that it was meant to be “even stronger” in subsequent seasons.

== Soundtrack ==
Invasion features an orchestral score performed by the Hollywood Studio Symphony Orchestra and composed by Jon Ehrlich and Jason Derlatka, incorporating many recurring themes and dramatic melodies. Their music was well received. The soundtrack of the show became available on October 21, 2008 at moviescoremedia.com. The album features more than 60 minutes of carefully selected tracks from the series.

Invasion is one of Ehrlich and Derlatka's favorite works saying: "Its always a treat working with a great orchestra. We love working with Shaun Cassidy."

== DVD releases ==
DVD name	Episodes	DVD release dates			Discs
DVD name	Episodes	Region 1	Region 2	Region 4	Discs
The Complete Series	22	August 22, 2006	September 4, 2006	September 9, 2008	6
