= Terry Dempsey =

American politician (1932–2023)

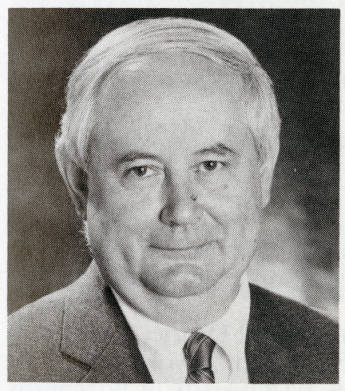

Minnesota House Minority Leader
- In office January 8, 1991 – May 11, 1992
- Preceded by: William R. Schreiber
- Succeeded by: Steve Sviggum

Member of the Minnesota House of Representatives from the 23A and 28B district
- In office January 3, 1979 – May 11, 1992
- Preceded by: Tony Eckstein
- Succeeded by: Barbara Vickerman

Personal details
- Born: February 17, 1932 Henderson, Minnesota, U.S.
- Died: September 2, 2023 (aged 91) Bloomington, Minnesota, U.S.
- Party: Republican Party of Minnesota
- Spouse: Janet
- Children: 1
- Education: College of St. Thomas; University of California, Hastings College of the Law
- Occupation: attorney, judge, legislator, veteran

Terence M. Dempsey (February 17, 1932 – September 2, 2023) was an American politician who was a member of the Minnesota House of Representatives who represented the old House districts 23A and 28B, which included all or portions of Brown, Cottonwood, Nicollet and Redwood counties in the south central part of the state. A Republican, he was an attorney and partner in the New Ulm law firm of Somsen, Dempsey and Schade. Later, he served as a Minnesota district court judge. His brother Jerry Dempsey also served in the Minnesota Legislature.

Dempsey was first elected to the House in 1978, unseating former New Ulm mayor and incumbent Rep. Tony Eckstein. He was re-elected to six additional terms. He served as minority leader from 1991 to 1992, and was an assistant minority leader from 1987 to 1991. He was chair of the Taxes Subcommittee for the Local Government Finance Division, and chair of the Rules and Legislative Administration Subcommittee's Select Committee on the Staten Case during the 1985-1986 Biennium.

Raised in Henderson, Dempsey attended the College of St. Thomas in Saint Paul, earning his bachelor's degree in political science. He served as a pilot in the United States Air Force for three years. He graduated from the University of California's Hasting's College of the Law in 1962, earning his J.D. He worked with the Minnesota Public Defender's Office for two years, and was the New Ulm City Attorney for 10 years. He also served on the Minnesota Governor's Crime Commission for two years.

In 1992, Dempsey was appointed a district court judge by Governor Arne Carlson. He resigned from the Minnesota House on May 11, 1992, and served as a Fifth Judicial District judge until 2002. After leaving the bench, he continued to be active in state politics, serving on the Minnesota Board on Aging from 2002 to 2010, and on the Minnesota Combative Sports Commission from 2010.

Dempsey died on September 2, 2023, at the age of 91.
