= Riverland Community College =

Community college in Minnesota, U.S.

Coordinates: 43°40′35″N 92°59′45″W

- Motto: Success Starts Here
- Type: Public community college
- Established: 1940
- President: Kathleen Linaker
- Faculty: 180
- Administrative staff: 100
- Students: 4,900
- Location: Austin, Albert Lea, Owatonna, Minnesota, United States
- Sporting affiliations: MCAC
- Mascot: Blue Devils
- Website: www.riverland.edu

Riverland Community College is a public community college with three campuses in southeastern Minnesota: Albert Lea, Austin, and Owatonna. Founded in 1940, Riverland offers educational programs and courses to over 4,900 students annually through traditional, hybrid, and online delivery systems.

The college offers academic degrees including bachelor's degrees through partner institutions, Associate of Arts (two-year transfer degrees), Associate of Arts with Emphasis, Associate of Fine Arts, diplomas, and certificates.

Riverland Community College is accredited by the Higher Learning Commission and is one of 31 institutions in the Minnesota State Colleges and Universities (now Minnesota State) system, Minnesota's largest provider of higher education.

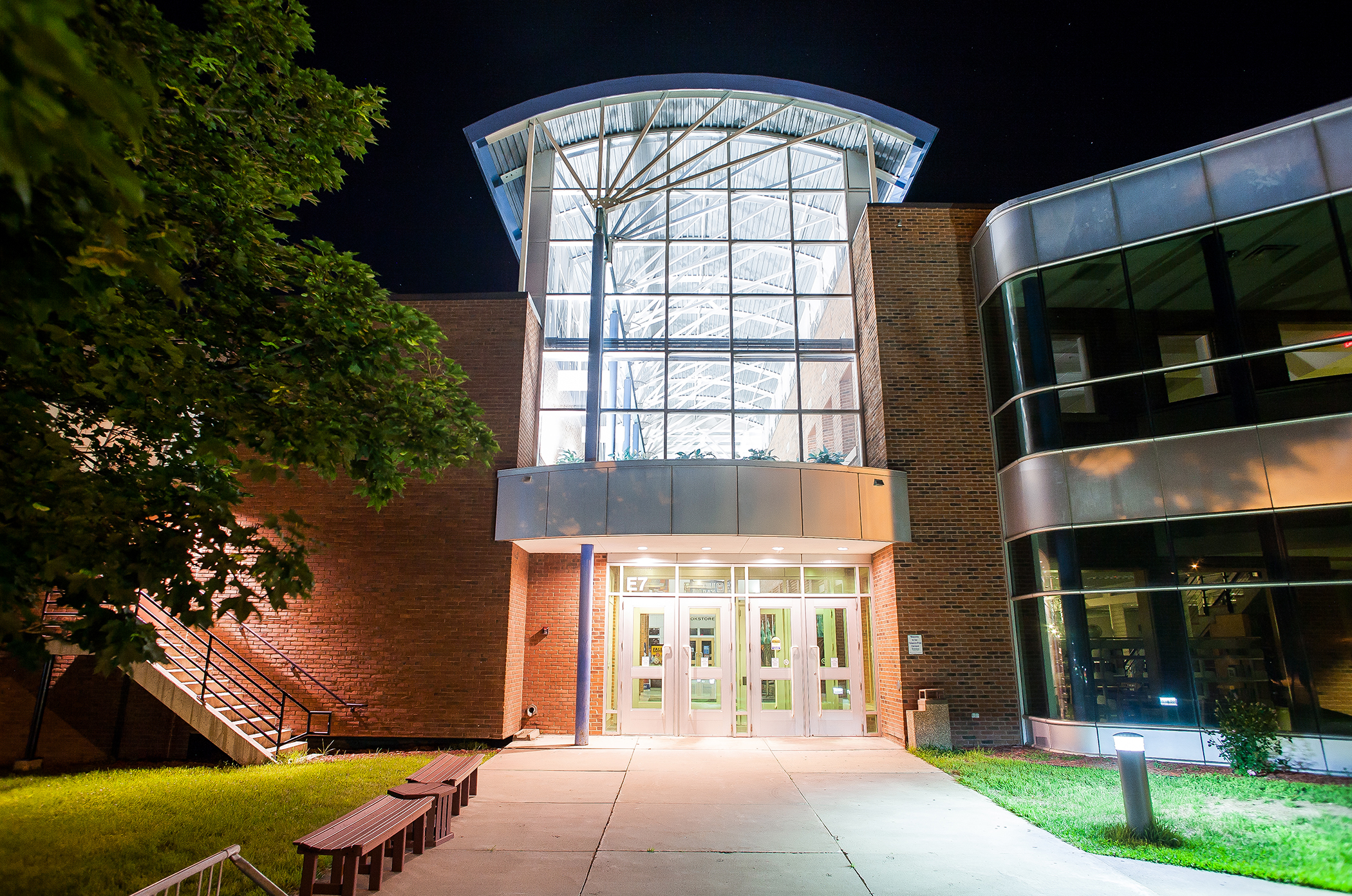
Riverland Community College - Austin Campus

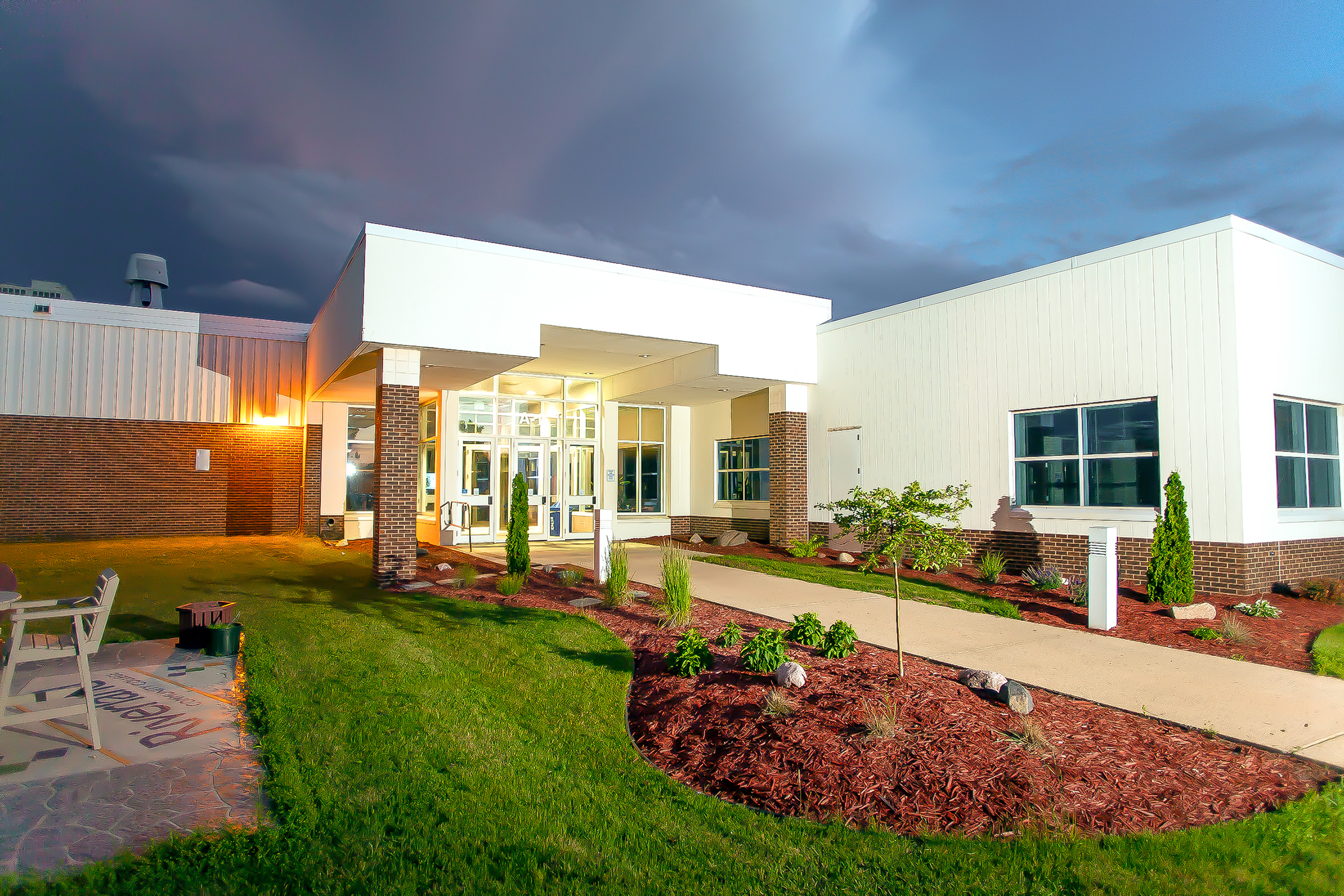
Riverland Community College - Albert Lea Campus

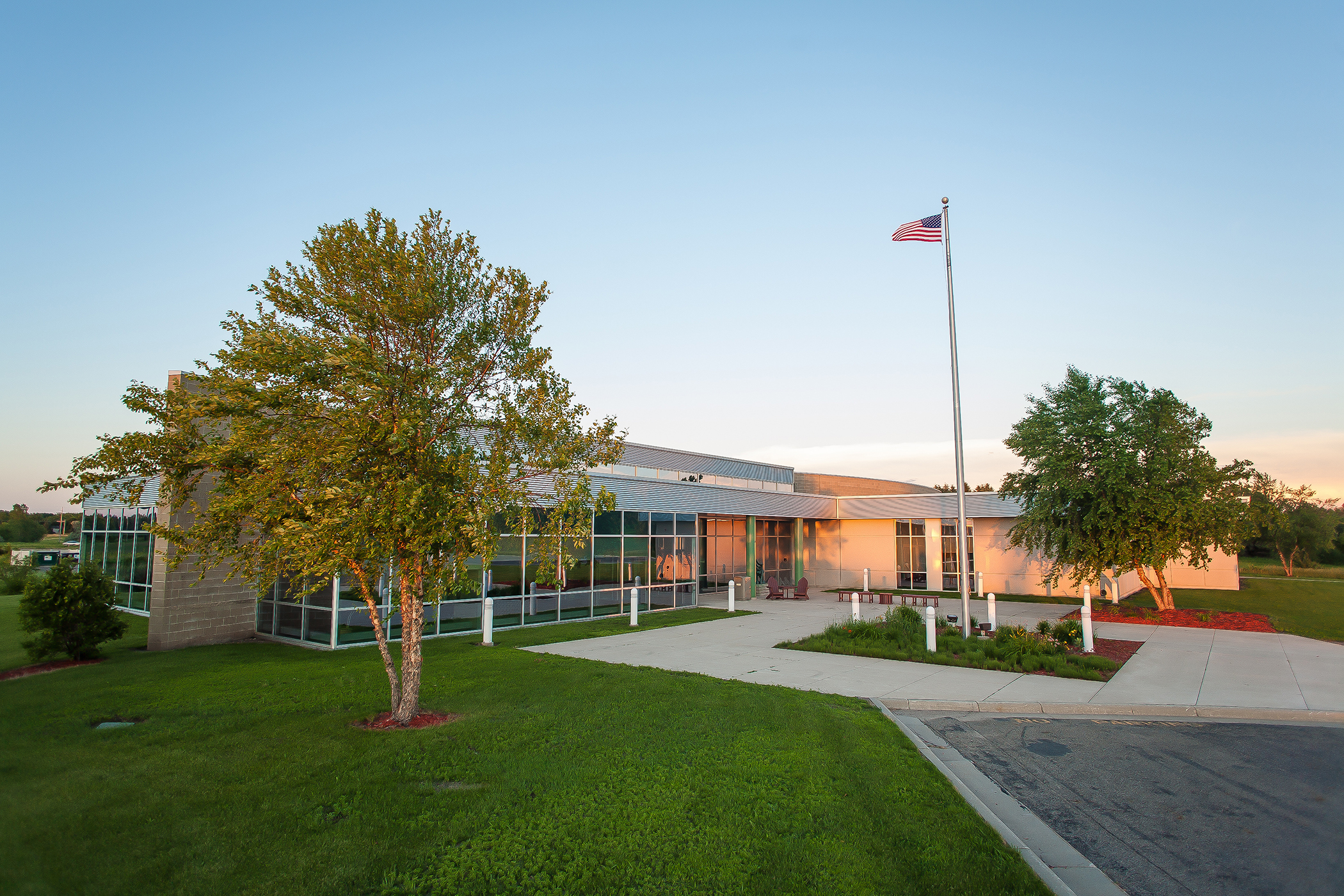
Riverland Community College - Owatonna Campus

== History ==
=== 1940: Austin Junior College ===
Austin Junior College opened on September 3, 1940. Enrollment was 138 freshmen, served by a faculty of five full-time and four part-time instructors.

=== 1951: Austin Area Vocational-Technical School ===
The Austin Area Vocational-Technical School was established in Austin as part of the public school system in 1951. At that time, it had about 250 students, providing post high school training carpentry, farm equipment mechanics, welding, machine shop (tool and die), automotive mechanics, auto body rebuilding, industrial electronics, practical nursing, and cosmetology.

=== 1966: Austin Junior College moves to new location, changes name to Austin State Junior College ===
In 1966, the college moved to a new campus, dedicated on January 29, 1967. Administrative offices moved to the new administration building in June 1966 and the institution opened for classes in September. There were about 850 students and a faculty of 40.

The school was officially renamed Austin State Junior College at that time.

=== 1968: Albert Lea Area Vocational-Technical School established ===
Albert Lea was tentatively approved by the State Board of Education on September 30, 1968. It received final approval on November 4, 1968.

Wayne Broecker was the director of the AVTI at Albert Lea.

=== 1971: Austin State Junior College Owatonna Extension Center opens ===
Classes started at Austin State Junior College Owatonna Extension Center on September 20, 1971.

=== 1972: Austin Area Vocational-Technical School changes name to Austin Area Vocational-Technical Institute ===
The school moved from various sites to a new Austin Area Vocational-Technical School in February-March 1972.

Along with all other "Area Vocational Technical Schools", by order of the state department of education, the name was changed to "Area Vocational-Technical Institute"

=== 1985: Owatonna Higher Education Center opens ===
In 1985, Owatonna Higher Education Center opened. Riverland Community College had been operating in the Owatonna area for 13 years, primarily offering customized training for buiness and industry.

=== 1991: Minnesota Riverland Technical College ===
Minnesota Riverland Technical College, District #2501, was formed on July 1, 1991, comprising the Austin, Faribault, and Rochester campuses and the Owatonna Technical Training Center.

=== 1996: Riverland Community College established ===
Riverland Community College was established on July 1, 1996, by merger of Austin Community College (established in 1940 as Austin Junior College), Riverland Technical College–Austin (established in 1951 as Austin Area Vocational School) and Owatonna campuses, and South Central Technical College–Albert Lea (established in 1968 as Albert Lea Technical Education Center).

=== 2001: Owatonna College and University Center ===
Classes began at Owatonna College and University Center (OCUC) on January 14, 2001. Riverland was at that time the host institution at OCUC. Classes were offered on the site by OCUC; Concordia University, St. Paul; Minnesota State University, Mankato; Southwest State University; University of St. Thomas; and South Central Technical College.

=== 2008: The Owatonna College And University Center (OCUC) is acquired by Minnesota State ===
In December 2008, Minnesota State University acquired Owatonna College and University. The acquisition was allowed by a bonding bill signed into law in April of that year by Governor Tim Pawlenty.

== Notable alumni ==
- Alvin Baldus, U.S. Representative from Wisconsin, 1975-1981
- Sandy Wollschlager, Minnesota state representative and chemist
