= Dark Water (2005 film) =

2005 American supernatural horror film by Walter Salles

- Theatrical release poster
- Directed by: Walter Salles
- Screenplay by: Rafael Yglesias
- Based on: "Floating Water" by Koji Suzuki Dark Water by: Hideo Nakata; Takashige Ichise
- Produced by: Roy Lee; Doug Davison; Bill Mechanic
- Starring: Jennifer Connelly; John C. Reilly; Tim Roth; Dougray Scott; Pete Postlethwaite; Camryn Manheim
- Cinematography: Affonso Beato
- Edited by: Daniel Rezende
- Music by: Angelo Badalamenti
- Production company: Touchstone Pictures
- Distributed by: Buena Vista Pictures Distribution
- Release date: July 8, 2005
- Running time: 105 minutes
- Countries: United States; Japan
- Language: English
- Budget: $30 million
- Box office: $49.5 million

Dark Water is a 2005 American supernatural horror film directed by Walter Salles and written by Rafael Yglesias. It is a remake of the 2002 Japanese film based on the short story "Floating Water" by Koji Suzuki, who also wrote the Ring trilogy. The film stars Jennifer Connelly, Tim Roth, John C. Reilly, Pete Postlethwaite, Perla Haney-Jardine, Dougray Scott and Ariel Gade.

Dark Water was released on July 8, 2005, and grossed $49.5 million worldwide. It is a co-production between the United States and Japan.

== Plot ==
Dahlia battles her ex-husband Kyle on shared custody conditions of their five-year-old daughter, Ceci. Kyle wants Ceci to live closer to his apartment in Jersey City, where there is a nearby school and rents are affordable. Dahlia instead chooses a dilapidated complex, with no other children, on Roosevelt Island – despite Ceci being able to access the dangerous and unprotected rooftop and its water tower. After they move in, the bedroom ceiling leaks dark water. Dahlia finds the apartment above flooded and a family portrait of the former tenants, the Rimsky family: a mother, father, and a girl who is Ceci's age. She complains to the manager and to the superintendent, Veeck, about the water, but they do nothing. Paranoid, she complains to her lawyer, Platzer, that Kyle paid people to damage the plumbing.

Dahlia is haunted by ghostly visions and a recurring nightmare in which Mrs. Rimsky threatens to harm Ceci if Dahlia talks to the police. Ceci's teacher is troubled by her "imaginary friend", Natasha, and Dahlia catches Ceci talking to Natasha as well. In the bathroom, Ceci passes out as dark water gushes from the toilets and sinks.

That night, Dahlia sees water spilling from the water tower. Inside, she finds Natasha's body and calls the police. Veeck is arrested, as he was aware of the body, which was why he refused to fix the complex's plumbing problems. Veeck admits that the Rimskys paid him to keep quiet about their wilful neglect of Natasha. Left to fend for herself, Natasha fell into the water and drowned, becoming a vengeful ghost who is jealous of Ceci.

Dahlia finally decides that perhaps the situation is unsafe for Ceci, and will move closer to Kyle. Dahlia is packing and Ceci is taking a bath when Natasha visits Dahlia, begging her not to leave. Natasha attempts to drown Ceci until Dahlia promises to be her mother, at which point, Natasha drowns Dahlia by flooding the bathroom; they walk the hall together as ghosts.

Ceci moves in with Kyle, who is now given full custody of Ceci. Three weeks later, they pick up the last of her belongings from the old apartment. Dahlia's ghost temporarily traps Ceci in the elevator, telling her she will always be with her. The elevator door opens, and Kyle takes Ceci to his home.

== Cast ==
- Jennifer Connelly as Dahlia
- John C. Reilly as Mr. Murray
- Tim Roth as Jeff Platzer
- Dougray Scott as Kyle
- Pete Postlethwaite as Veeck
- Camryn Manheim as Ceci's teacher
- Ariel Gade as Ceci
- Perla Haney-Jardine as Natasha / young Dahlia

== Filming locations ==
- Roosevelt Island, New York City
- Toronto, Ontario
- Syosset High School in Syosset, New York
- Chandler Valley Center Studios in Panorama City, Los Angeles

== Reception ==
=== Box office ===
Dark Water played in 2,657 theaters with a complete average run of 3.2 weeks. The film made $10 million, which is 39% of the movie's total gross, on its opening weekend. It went on to make $25.5 million in the US and $24 million in the international box office, adding up to a worldwide box office total of $49.5 million.

=== Critical response ===
Dark Water holds a 47% approval rating at Rotten Tomatoes based on 154 reviews and an average score of 5.54/10. The site's critics' consensus reads: "All the atmospherics in Dark Water can't make up for the lack of genuine scares." Metacritic, which uses a weighted average, assigned the film a score of 52 out of 100, based on 35 critics, indicating "mixed or average" reviews. Audiences polled by CinemaScore gave the film an average grade of "D−" on an A+ to F scale.

William Thomas described the film in Empire as "interesting and unsettling, but never terrifying. Best viewed as a family drama-come-Tale Of The Unexpected rather than a full-on horror". For Rolling Stone, Peter Travers wrote, "A classy ghost story is just the ticket in a summer of crass jolts... Screenwriter Rafael Yglesias (Fearless) stays alert to the psychological fears that underpin the supernatural doings in the apartment upstairs. Connelly digs deep into the role of a woman with issues of abandonment and rage that slowly reveal their roots. In a movie with more subtext than Rosemary’s Baby, nearly everyone, including Tim Roth as Dahlia’s lawyer, harbors secrets. Salles unleashes a torrent of suspense for one purpose: to plumb the violence of the mind."

Todd McCarthy of Variety called it "well-crafted but thoroughly unsuspenseful" and said it "is dripping with clammy, claustrophobic atmosphere, but ultimately reveals itself as just another mildewed, child-centric ghost story of little import or resonance." From The Washington Post, Ann Hornaday described the film as a "tasteful but unremitting bummer and yet one more case of an Oscar-winning actress proving that she can still do the kinds of disposable movies big awards are supposedly meant to banish from your résume forever." For Slant Magazine Nick Schager wrote that the film improves on the source material characterizations, while over explaining the supernatural events. He concluded by saying, "this slick adaptation is also a moldy, third-generation retread of The Ring."

=== Accolades ===
Year	Award	Category	Subject	Result	Notes
2006	Fangoria Chainsaw Awards	Best Actress	Jennifer Connelly	Nominated	
2006	Fangoria Chainsaw Awards	Best Supporting Actor	John C. Reilly	Nominated	
2006	Fangoria Chainsaw Awards	Best Screenplay	Rafael Yglesias	Nominated	
2006	Fangoria Chainsaw Awards	Best Score	Angelo Badalamenti	Nominated	
2005	Teen Choice Awards	Choice Summer Movie	Dark Water	Nominated	

== Soundtrack ==
- Soundtrack music by Angelo Badalamenti
- "I Got Soul" Written by John Martinez and Josh Kessler Performed by Scar featuring Filthy Rich Courtesy of Marc Ferrari/MasterSource
- "Electrified" Written by Mike Gallagher and Marc Ferrari Performed by Mike Gallagher Courtesy of Marc Ferrari/MasterSource
- "Itsy Bitsy Spider" (uncredited) Written by Traditional
- "Namidaga Afuretemo" (Japanese Theme Song) Performed by Crystal Kay

== See also ==
- List of ghost films
