= Mad at the World: A Life of John Steinbeck =

2020 book by William Souder

Mad at the World: A Life of John Steinbeck is a biographical book about John Steinbeck by William Souder which was published on 13 October 2020 by W. W. Norton.

== Background ==
William Souder spent months in Steinbeck's native California researching for the book, including time at the National Steinbeck Center in Salinas, Center for Steinbeck Studies at San Jose State University, the Steinbeck Collection at Stanford University. At the National Steinbeck Center, he transcribed for the first time hours of interviews of Salinas locals who had known Steinbeck personally.

== Critical reception and review ==
Scott Pugh of Steinbeck Review wrote, "to my eye, the background descriptions of history, geography, and politics in Mad at the World are barely informative at best", Sam Sacks of The Wall Street Journal wrote, "Mad at the World is condensed, clear and readable." and Mary Ann Gwinn of Star Tribune wrote, "In this vivid biography, Minnesota writer William Souder brings John Steinbeck to great, prickly, tormented life."

The book has been also reviewed by Brenda Wineapple of The New York Times Book Review, Gavin Jones, Humanities Professor at Stanford University, Alexander C. Kafka of The Washington Post, Wendy Smith of The Boston Globe and Claire Lowdon of The Times.

== Awards ==
- Los Angeles Times Book Prize for Biography in 2020
- Best Non Fiction Book of 2020 by Publishers Weekly
