= Mary L. Mallett =

American temperance leader (1860–1944)

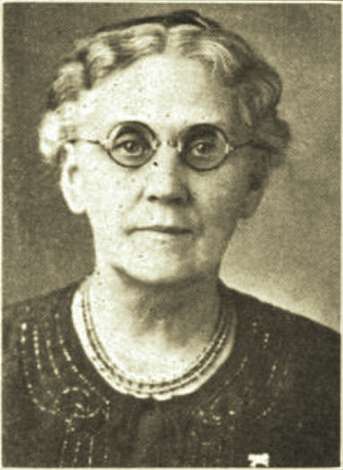
- Standard encyclopedia of the alcohol problem, 1928
- Born: Mary Louise Hansen; May 2, 1860; Henderson, Minnesota, U.S.
- Died: June 29, 1944 (aged 84); Portland, Oregon, U.S.
- Occupation(s): President, Oregon State Woman's Christian Temperance Union
- Known for: Mary Mallett Cottage, Children's Farm Home
- Spouse: Jerome Hart Mallett (m. 1881)

Mary L. Mallett (née, Hansen; 1860–1944) was an American temperance advocate who served as president of the Oregon State Woman's Christian Temperance Union (WCTU). She was also the co-founder of the Children's Farm Home in Corvallis, Oregon.

== Early life and education ==
Mary Louise Hansen was born near Henderson, Minnesota, May 2, 1860. Her parents were Hans Hansen (1836–1920) and Louise (née, Warnecke) (1843–1921). Mary had eight younger siblings: Edwawrd, John, William, Benjamin, George, Anna, Helena, and Louis.

She was educated in the public schools, later obtaining a complete musical education. Hansen was only 12 years old when she began to sing in temperance meetings.

== Career ==
In 1878, she joined the Sons of Temperance, in which Order she served as secretary. In the following year, she joined the WCTU of Brownton, Minnesota, where she took an active part in Gospel Temperance meetings on Sunday afternoons, singing and passing pledges wherever she was needed in the work.

On September 28, 1881, she married Jerome Hart Mallett (1855–1944), a hardware merchant, of Cannon Falls, Minnesota. They had five children: Winona, Herbert, George, Ernest, and Mary. The family removed in 1885 to Groton, South Dakota, and in 1907, to Portland, Oregon. She became associated with the WCTU in Groton (1886–1907), serving as superintendent of Mothers’ Meetings, leader of the Loyal Temperance Legion, and local president (1895–1907).

After removing to Portland, Oregon, Mallett was made president of the Multnomah County WCTU (1909–14). During this period, she was active in three campaigns to make Oregon a dry state, speaking in the churches, on the streets of the city, in the parks, and wherever opportunity afforded a chance to advocate Prohibition. She also served as vice-chair of the Prohibition Party of the State which twice nominated her as a candidate for the Legislature. She subsequently served for two years as State WCTU superintendent of Child Welfare and for two years as superintendent of Medical Temperance. In 1918, Mallett was appointed probation officer of the Portland Juvenile Court, and in 1920, she was elected State president of the WCTU, which office she held until 1927.

Mallett was a co-founder of the Children's Farm Home, Corvallis, Oregon.

== Death and legacy ==
Mary L. Mallett died in Portland, Oregon, June 29, 1944.

Built in 1949, the Mary Mallett Cottage at the Children's Farm Home was named in her honor.
