= Jim Ojala =

American film director

James Ojala
- Born: May 6, 1977 (age 48); Duluth, Minnesota
- Occupations: Makeup & special effects artist, director, screenwriter
- Website: www.ojalafilms.com

James Ojala (born May 6, 1977) is an American special effects and makeup artist, screenwriter and film director.

== Career overview ==
Early years

Ojala grew up in Duluth, Minnesota, where he developed an early love of film through horror movies and the works of directors such as Martin Scorsese, Stanley Kubrick, George A. Romero and Buddy Giovinazzo. Following his graduation from Duluth Central High School in 1995, Ojala began his career working in public-access television. There, he and his friends created the series My Three Scums, a horror comedy sitcom about a dysfunctional family of mutants and monsters which he described as "sort of an obscene punk rock Munsters on crack". The series ran locally for three years, after which Ojala sent tapes of the show - in a large box filled with inflated helium balloons reading "I LOVE MY THREE SCUMS" - to Troma Entertainment co-founder Lloyd Kaufman, who was impressed enough by both the series and its eye-catching promotion to offer Ojala an internship on the feature film Citizen Toxie: The Toxic Avenger IV. Upon receiving the news, Ojala immediately quit his job as a medical records filing clerk and moved to New York to work on the film.

Early Hollywood career

During the production of Citizen Toxie, Ojala stepped into an open spot in the film's makeup effects department, working alongside Tim Considine of special effects company Direct FX. At the film's completion, Considine offered Ojala a full-time assisting position within his company. With Direct FX, Ojala worked on numerous features, commercials and theater, which included manufacturing an entire line of bald caps whose clients included Saturday Night Live and several Broadway productions. Ojala also worked alongside B-movie auteur Larry Fessenden on the 2001 horror film Wendigo and was involved with the Millennium Film Workshop, where he learned how to work with 16mm film under the supervision of underground filmmaker Mike Kuchar.

After the events of September 11, Ojala found it difficult to obtain any type of work in New York, eventually forcing him to seek out career options in California. Only a few days into a week-long visit to Los Angeles, Ojala was hired on the spot as a lab and on-set technician for the visual effects studio Almost Human, Inc., providing various functions including moldmaking, makeup application and puppeteering for film, commercials and television series including Buffy the Vampire Slayer, Angel and Firefly. Since leaving Almost Human in 2005, Ojala has worked with several special effects companies including Autonomous FX, Animal Makers, Spectral Motion and Legacy Effects, and has worked on mainstream productions including Hellboy II: The Golden Army, 2012, Where the Wild Things Are, Thor, X-Men: The Last Stand and Pacific Rim.

Current career

In 2005, Ojala established his own independent special effects studio and film production company Ojala Productions, specializing in makeup and creature effects for film and television as well as producing in-house projects written and directed by Ojala himself. Among others, Ojala Productions contributed special effects work for films like 2001 Maniacs: Field of Screams and the critically acclaimed Deadgirl, television shows including Tim and Eric Awesome Show, Great Job! and the music videos for Snoop Dogg's Malice n Wonderland album. During this time, Ojala wrote and directed the short films The Incredible Torture Trio, which played at the TromaDance Film Festival and was later distributed internationally on a Best of TromaDance DVD compilation, the 48 Hour Film Festival entry Truthus: A Family Holiday and Marvel Zombies: The Movie, a fake trailer based on the Marvel Comics property of the same name. Marvel Zombies: The Movie drew high praise and recognition from online comics communities and eventually went viral, later being featured on the G4 pop culture news series Attack of the Show! where hosts Kevin Pereira and Chris Hardwick called it "one of the most amazing fan movies we've ever seen".

With Monty Broussard, Ojala wrote and directed the 2011 science fiction thriller short Harvest, a proposed pilot for a television or web series. The following year, Ojala was featured in Craig Chenery's book Blood Spatter: A Guide to Cinematic Zombie Violence, Gore and Special Effects and in 2013, he directed the music video for comedy punk band The Radioactive Chicken Heads' "Deviled Egg", which was highlighted on horror channel Fearnet as their "Music Video of the Week". In 2016, Ojala provided make-up effects for popular indie pop band Lucius' music video "Gone Insane"; the video received notable mainstream recognition, with Rolling Stone describing the effects "strange [and] striking" and the Village Voice calling them "exceptional".

Beginning in 2017, Ojala has served as co-producer for the Shudder original talk show The Core, in which he also appears as a regular on-screen guest detailing the secrets and artistry behind practical special effects.

In October 2018, after four years in production, Ojala released his first feature film as a writer-director, Strange Nature.

After producing and directing several music videos, Ojala, shot, edited and directed "The Last Time." It is the first official music video for legendary punk band, Fear (band) and stars original singer/songwriter Lee Ving and original drummer, Spit Stix.

== Filmography ==
=== As director/screenwriter ===
Year	Film	Notes
2004	The Incredible Torture Trio	Short film
2006	Truthus: A Family Holiday	Short film co-writer/director with Monty Broussard
2008	Marvel Zombies: The Movie	Short film co-writer/director with Scott Fields
2011	Harvest	Short film co-writer with Monty Broussard
2013	"Deviled Egg"	Music video by The Radioactive Chicken Heads
2018	Strange Nature	Feature film

=== As makeup artist/special effects technician ===
Film

Year	Film	Notes
2000	Citizen Toxie: The Toxic Avenger IV	
2001	Wendigo	Creature effects crew
2003	Monster Makers	
2004	Dead Birds	Mold maker
2004	The Fallen	
2004	Frankenfish	
2004	Lightning Bug	
2004	Pagans	
2004	Tales from the Crapper	
2005	Alien Apocalypse	Creature effects crew
2005	All Souls Day: Dia de los Muertos	On-set dresser
2005	Deuce Bigalow: European Gigolo	
2005	Dirty	Uncredited
2005	House of the Dead 2	
2005	Lackawanna Blues	
2005	Man with the Screaming Brain	
2006	Big Bad Wolf	On-set makeup artist
2006	The Darkroom	
2006	Lady in the Water	
2006	Poultrygeist: Night of the Chicken Dead	Creature effects (baby zombie chick puppet)
2006	The Thirst	
2006	Voodoo Moon	
2006	X-Men: The Last Stand	
2007	The Devil's Muse	Special effects director
2007	Fade	
2007	Quench	Special effects coordinator
2008	Dark Reel	
2008	Deadgirl	Special makeup effects artist & designer
2008	Hellboy II: The Golden Army	
2008	Marvel Zombies: The Movie	
2009	2012	Puppeteer
2009	Blood: The Last Vampire	Mold department
2009	Where the Wild Things Are	Mold department
2010	2001 Maniacs: Field of Screams	
2010	Tron: Legacy	
2011	Thor	
2012	Children of Sorrow	
2012	Jack & Diane	
2012	John Dies at the End	
2013	Axe Giant: The Wrath of Paul Bunyan	
2013	Pacific Rim	Uncredited
2013	Proxy	Special effects coordinator
2013	Saint Bernard	Prosthetic makeup effects artist
2014	Brutal	Makeup designer
2014	In the Mind's Eye	
2014	Redlands	
2014	Silent Retreat	
2014	Volcano Zombies	
2014	Whispers	
2016	Crabs!	

Television

Year	Film	Notes
2001-2002	Buffy the Vampire Slayer	Seasons 6-7
2001-2004	Angel	Seasons 3-5
2002	Firefly	
2003	Miracles	
2005	Point Pleasant	
2005	The Inside	
2007	House	Episode: "Insensitive"
2010	Tim and Eric Awesome Show, Great Job!	Episodes: "Crows" and "Chrimbus Special"
2011	Jon Benjamin Has a Van	Episode: "Breakdown Van"
2011	True Blood	Episodes: "I'm Alive and on Fire" and "If You Love Me, Why Am I Dyin'?"
2014 - 2015	Comedy Bang! Bang!	

Short films

Year	Film
2005	Broken
2008	Marvel Zombies: The Movie
2009	Stealth
2010	Kill Devil Hill
2010	Malice n Wonderland
2011	Randy the Vegetarian Zombie
2013	Heartless
2014	A Boy's Life
2014	Gahiji
2014	Unbelief
