= Ariel Gade =

American actress

- Born: 1996 or 1997 (age 29–30)
- Occupation: Actress
- Years active: 2003–2011

Ariel Gade (born c. 1996) is an American former child actress. She made her first acting appearance on an episode of television's Strong Medicine, and followed this with a performance in the Barry Levinson film Envy (2004).

== Career ==
Gade's second film role was as Ceci in Dark Water (2005). She acquired the role of Rose on Shaun Cassidy’s Invasion in 2005. Gade made a guest appearance on The Tonight Show with Jay Leno in July 2005. She retired her acting career in 2011, in order to focus on school and family.

== Filmography ==
Year	Title	Role	Notes
2003	Then Came Jones	Kaitlin	Unsold ABC pilot
2003	Strong Medicine	Jewel Wheeler	1 episode ("Seize the Day")
2004	Envy	Lula Dingman	Supporting role
2005	Dark Water	Cecilia "Ceci" Williams	Main role
2005–2006	Invasion	Rose Varon	Main cast
2007	Aliens vs. Predator: Requiem	Molly O'Brien	Supporting role
2009	Call of the Wild	Ryann Hale	Main role
2009	Meteor	M. Keely Payne	TV miniseries
2009	NCIS: Los Angeles	Emma Perez	1 episode ("Identity")
2011	Some Guy Who Kills People	Amy Wheeler	Supporting role
