= Jerry Dempsey =

American businessman, educator, and politician

Jerome Richard "Dick, Jerry" Dempsey (April 21, 1933 – January 14, 2015) was an American businessman, educator, and politician.

== Career ==
Born in Henderson, Minnesota, Dempsey served in the United States Army from 1955 to 1957. He received his bachelor's degree from the University of St. Thomas, his master's degree from the University of Wisconsin–River Falls, and his Specialist Degree in Education Administration from Winona State University. He began his teaching career teaching social studies at Goodhue High School, Goodhue, Minnesota, in 1959 and at Hastings High School, Hastings, Minnesota, from 1960 to 1973. In 1974, Dempsey served as an assistant principal at Hastings Junior High School (later renamed Hastings Middle School) until his retirement from education in 1993. He was elected to the Minnesota House of Representatives in 1992 and served seven terms, from 1993 until 2006. He was a member of the Republican Party. His brother Terry Dempsey also served in the Minnesota Legislature from 1979 to 1992. Dempsey was also in the banking business and served on the board of directors for First Federal Bank.

== Death ==
Dempsey died on January 14, 2015, in Hastings, Minnesota, where he had lived since 1960.
