= Henderson, Minnesota =

Town in Minnesota, United States

Henderson
- town
- Main Street, between Fifth and Sixth Streets

- Location of Henderson within Sibley County, Minnesota
- Coordinates: 44°31′40″N 93°54′33″W
- Country: United States
- State: Minnesota
- County: Sibley
- Founded: August 1852
- Platted: 1855
- Incorporated (town): February 21, 1855
- Incorporated (borough): January 23, 1866
- Incorporated (city): March 23, 1891

Government
  - Type: Mayor-council
  - Mayor: Cora Koester

Area
  - Total: 1.10 sq mi (2.86 km^{2})
  - Land: 1.07 sq mi (2.78 km^{2})
  - Water: 0.031 sq mi (0.08 km^{2})
- Elevation: 761 ft (232 m)

Population (2020)
  - Total: 960
  - Estimate (2022): 967
  - Density: 893.6/sq mi (345.01/km^{2})
- Time zone: UTC−6 (Central (CST))
  - Summer (DST): UTC−5 (CDT)
- ZIP Code: 56044
- Area code: 507
- FIPS code: 27-28394
- GNIS feature ID: 2394347
- Sales tax: 6.875%
- Website: henderson-mn.com

Henderson is a town in Sibley County, Minnesota, United States. The population was 960 at the 2020 census.

== History ==
Henderson was founded in August 1852 by Joseph R. Brown, and was named for his mother's maiden name.

By 1855, Henderson had become a fast-growing city. It harbored more than 60 buildings, including a hotel, a warehouse, a steam sawmill, as well as Brown's house, which functioned as a boarding house, a store and the Brown family residence.

In the following years, Henderson quickly became a major distribution center for the inland settlements surrounding the Minnesota River Valley. It was the trailhead of the Henderson-Pembina road.

By the mid-1860s, Henderson had two major brickyards, The Mattei and Schwartz Brickyards, which both contributed heavily to the early 1900s brick-style buildings still found in Henderson.

The seat for Sibley County was originally established in Henderson, and an imposing courthouse was erected, being put into service in 1879. But pressure from residents of Gaylord, from as far back as 1887, to gain the county seat precipitated a 1915 countywide vote that resulted in Gaylord gaining the seat; this caused around 200 residents to leave Henderson, a major decline in the town's population. During the 50 years after that population loss, Henderson's economy increasingly centered on agriculture. Its success in transitioning to agriculture brought rise to the present Sauerkraut Days celebration. The former courthouse, now the Henderson Community Building, houses Henderson City offices.

== Museums and library ==
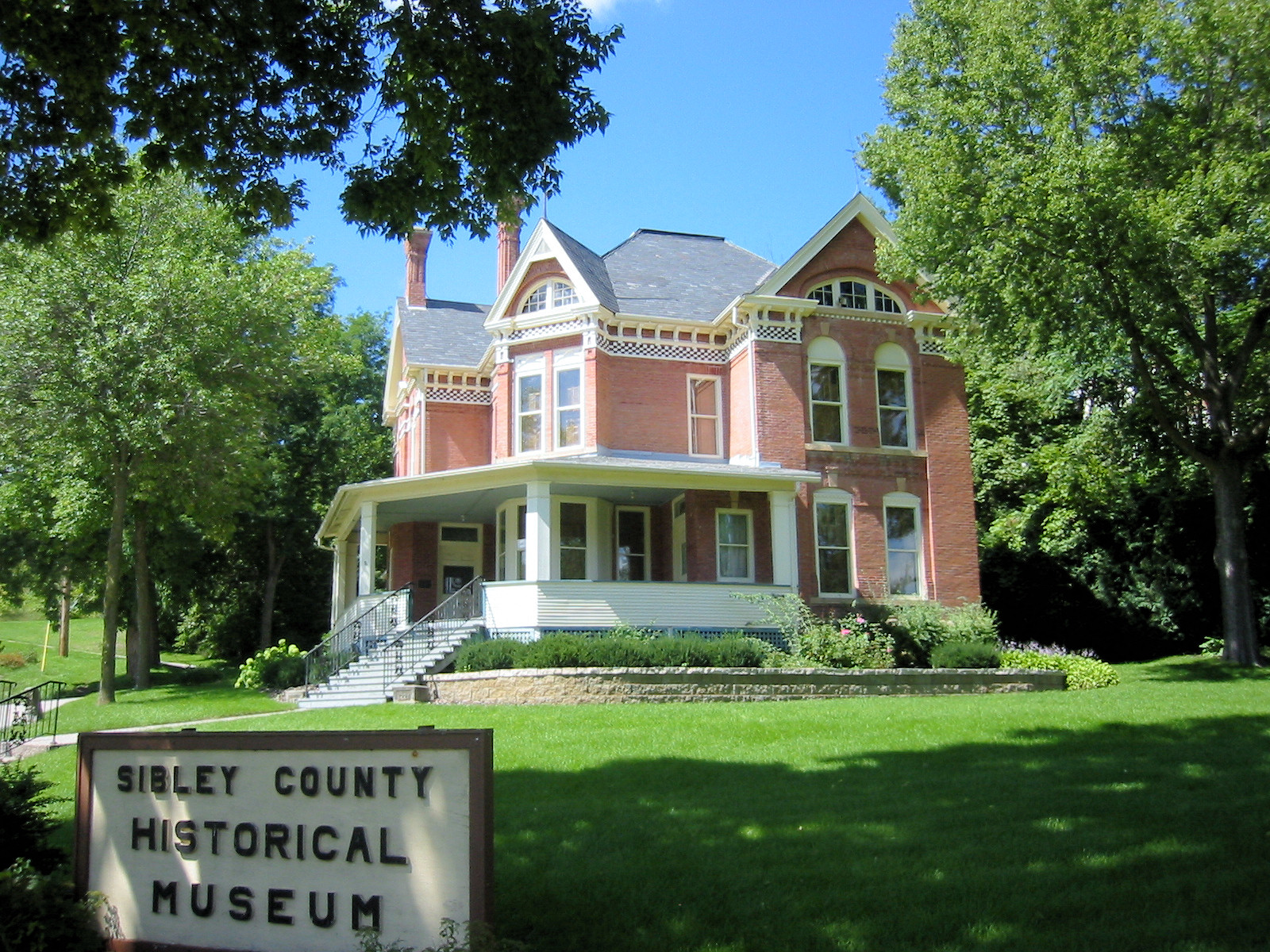
Sibley County Historical Society Museum

Henderson has two museums and one public library.

- Sibley County Historical Museum: Operated by the Sibley County Historical Society
- J.R. Brown Minnesota River Center: Operated by the Joseph R. Brown Heritage Society
- Henderson Public Library: Henderson is member of the Traverse des Sioux Library Cooperative.

== Area parks and wildlife refuges ==
Allanson's Park

In 1855, the town founder, J.R. Brown, designated the land for future use as a public park. This land became Allanson's Park, which today has 15+ camping sites for tents, campers and RV's, a picnic shelter and playground.

Bender Park

Bender Park is a city park that has a large multipurpose shelter where Sauerkraut Days is held. It also has a two baseball fields and a concession stand. It is the home field to the Le Sueur-Henderson High School Girls Fast pitch team.

Henderson Hummingbird Garden

The Henderson Hummingbird Garden was established as a part of the Henderson Hummingbird Hurrah and is in Bender Park.

High Island Park

High Island Creek Park is 220 acres with over six miles of trails and camping opportunities.

Rush River Park

Rush River Park is 285 acres with over 12 miles of trails with a picnic shelter and camping areas. It is a popular horseback riding destination.

Ney Nature Center

The Ney Nature Center is 446 acres. It provides year-round outdoor activities and indoor programing.

Minnesota Valley National Wildlife Refuge

The Minnesota Valley National Wildlife Refuge is over 70 miles long, stretching from Bloomington to Henderson. It occupies over 14,000 acres. The Refuge is managed by the U.S. Fish and Wildlife Service. About 50% of Henderson borders the Refuge.

== Notable people ==
- Joseph R. Brown, Minnesota and Wisconsin territorial legislator and founder of Henderson
- Jerry Dempsey, Minnesota state representative
- Terry Dempsey, Minnesota state representative and jurist
- Franklin P. Kroehler, Minnesota state senator
- Albert G. Lieske, Minnesota state representative
- Mary L. Mallett, temperance activist
- Ray Oldenburg, urban sociologist
- Henry Poehler, U.S. representative from Minnesota
- Edward T. Young, Minnesota attorney general

== Schools ==
The local school district is Independent School District 2397 and operates three facilities. It is the consolidated district of ISD 734 (Henderson) and ISD 393 (Le Sueur), which consolidated in 1991.

- Park Elementary: Park is in Le Sueur with grades K-3
- Hilltop Elementary: Hilltop is in Henderson and is a 4-5 STEM elementary school
- Le Sueur-Henderson High School: The middle school/high school is in Le Sueur with grades 6–12.

Minnesota New County School: MNCS is a Minnesota Public Charter School with two sites that utilizes project-based learning. MNCS Elementary, also known as the "1900 Building", teaches grades K-5. MNCS High School is on Main Street and teaches grades 6–12.

EdVisions Off-Campus High School, also known as EOC, is a Minnesota public charter school formed in Henderson. It is an online high school that utilizes project-based learning with student enrollment from all over Minnesota.

== Politics ==
Henderson is in Minnesota's 7th congressional district, represented by Michelle Fischbach. It is in Minnesota Senate district 17, represented by Glenn Gruenhagen, and Minnesota House district 17B, represented by Bobbie Harder.

== Geography ==
According to the United States Census Bureau, the town has an area of 1.09 square miles (2.82 km^{2}); 1.06 square miles (2.75 km^{2}) is land and 0.03 square miles (0.08 km^{2}) is water.

Minnesota State Highways 19 and 93 are two of the main routes in the community. U.S. Highway 169 passes nearby.

== Demographics ==
Historical population
Census	Pop.	Note	%±
1870	706		—
1880	964		36.5%
1890	909		−5.7%
1900	904		−0.6%
1910	753		−16.7%
1920	766		1.7%
1930	672		−12.3%
1940	820		22.0%
1950	762		−7.1%
1960	728		−4.5%
1970	730		0.3%
1980	739		1.2%
1990	746		0.9%
2000	910		22.0%
2010	886		−2.6%
2020	960		8.4%
2022 (est.)	967		0.7%
U.S. Decennial Census; 2020 Census

=== 2020 census ===
As of the census of 2020, there were 960 people and 355 households residing in the town.

=== 2010 census ===
As of the census of 2010, there were 886 people, 377 households, and 236 families residing in the town. The population density was 835.8 inhabitants per square mile (322.7/km^{2}). There were 405 housing units at an average density of 382.1 per square mile (147.5/km^{2}). The racial makeup of the town was 97.5% White, 0.2% Asian, 1.4% from other races, and 0.9% from two or more races. Hispanic or Latino of any race were 2.5% of the population.

There were 377 households, of which 29.7% had children under the age of 18 living with them, 50.4% were married couples living together, 7.4% had a female householder with no husband present, 4.8% had a male householder with no wife present, and 37.4% were non-families. 30.5% of all households were made up of individuals, and 15.4% had someone living alone who was 65 years of age or older. The average household size was 2.35 and the average family size was 2.95.

The median age in the town was 39.5 years. 23.4% of residents were under the age of 18; 6.7% were between the ages of 18 and 24; 27.1% were from 25 to 44; 27.1% were from 45 to 64; and 15.6% were 65 years of age or older. The gender makeup of the town was 47.9% male and 52.1% female.

=== 2000 census ===
As of 2000 the median income for a household in the town was $43,125, and the median income for a family was $49,091. Males had a median income of $31,736 versus $25,688 for females. The per capita income for the town was $17,544. About 4.7% of families and 6.6% of the population were below the poverty line, including 8.7% of those under age 18 and 9.7% of those age 65 or over.

== Gallery ==
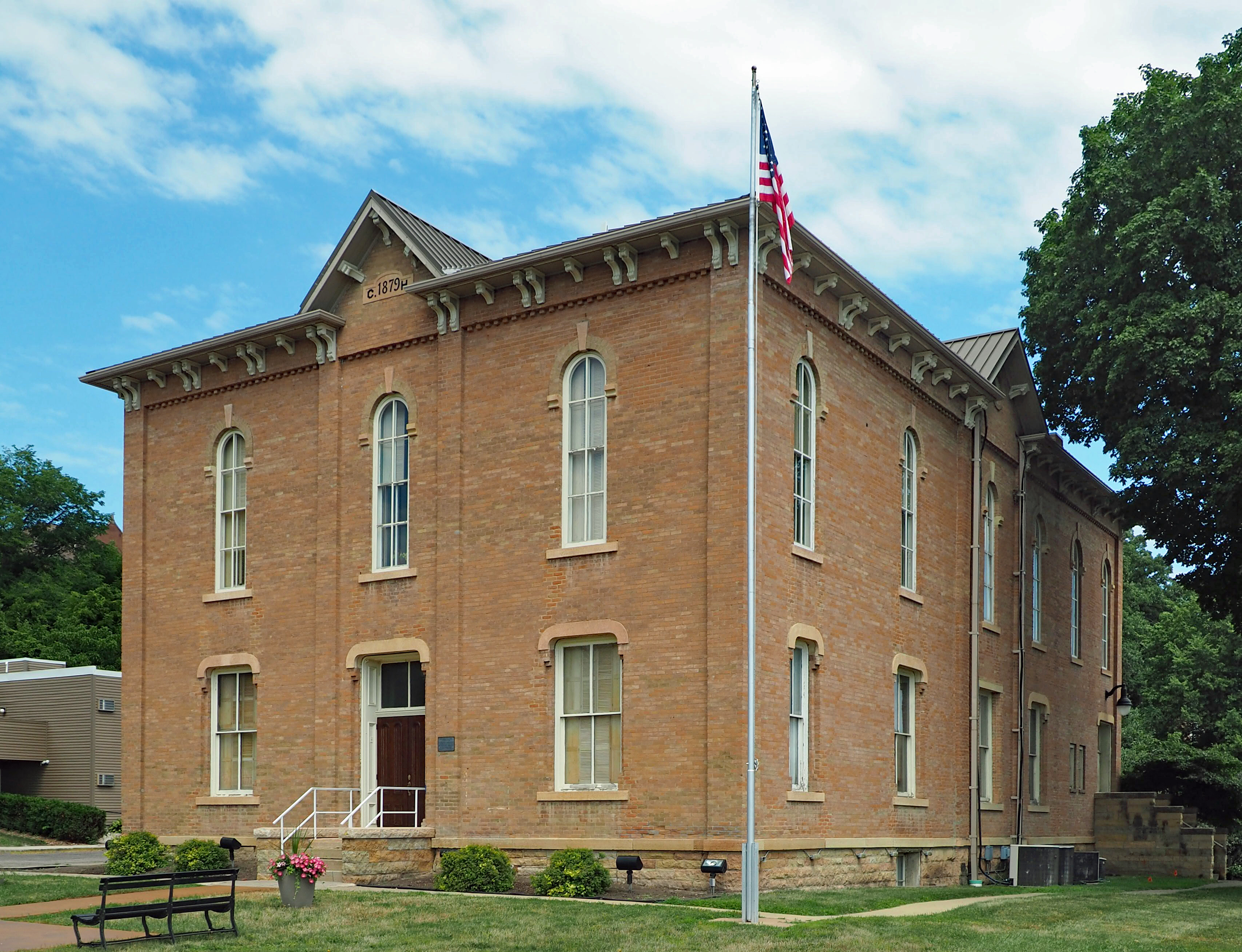
City Hall (old court house)

Businesses on south side of Main Street

Henderson Fire Department

J. Gerken Building- now U.S post office

Keller Store and Hotel buildings
