= National Book Award for Nonfiction =

Annual literary award in the United States

- Awarded for: Outstanding nonfiction work by US citizens.
- Location: New York City
- First award: 1935
- Website: National Book Foundation

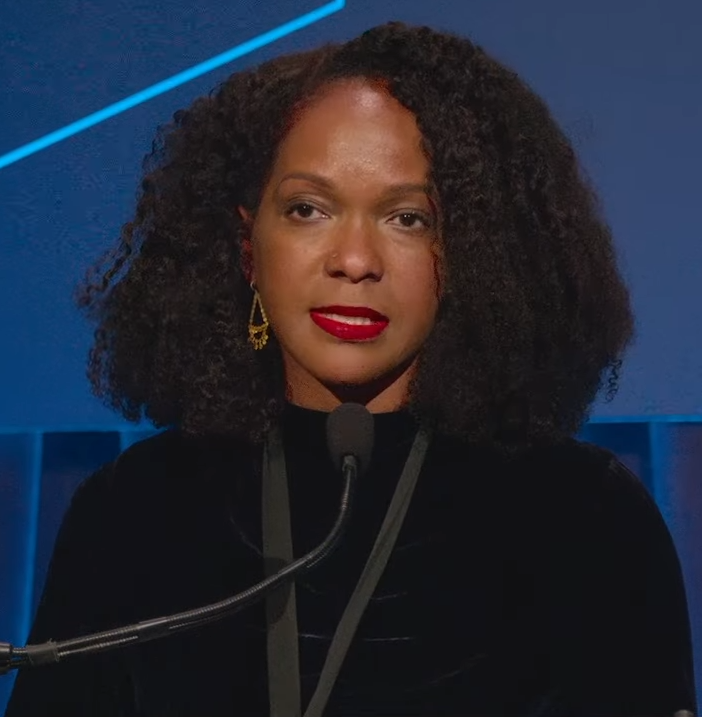
Imani Perry accepting the 2022 National Book Award for Nonfiction

The National Book Award for Nonfiction is one of five US annual National Book Awards, which are given by the National Book Foundation to recognize outstanding literary work by US citizens. They are awards "by writers to writers". The panelists are five "writers who are known to be doing great work in their genre or field".

The original National Book Awards recognized the "Most Distinguished" biography and nonfiction books (two) of 1935 and 1936, and the "Favorite" nonfiction books of 1937 to 1940. The "Bookseller Discovery" and the "Most Original Book" sometimes recognized nonfiction. (See below.)

The general "Nonfiction" award was one of three when the National Book Awards were re-established in 1950 for 1949 publications, which the National Book Foundation considers the origin of its current Awards series. From 1964 to 1983, under different administrators, there were multiple nonfiction categories.

The current Nonfiction award recognizes one book written by a U.S. citizen and published in the U.S. from December 1 to November 30. The National Book Foundation accepts nominations from publishers until June 15, requires mailing nominated books to the panelists by August 1, and announces five finalists in October. The winner is announced on the day of the final ceremony in November. The award is $10,000 and a bronze sculpture; other finalists get $1000, a medal, and a citation written by the panel. The sculpture by Louise Nevelson dates from the 1980 awards. The $10,000 and $1000 cash prizes and autumn recognition for current-year publications date from 1984. (Note: Beginning 2005, the official annual webpages (see References) provide more information: the panelists in each award category, the publisher of each finalist, some audio-visual interviews with authors, etc. For 1996 to date, annual webpages generally provide transcripts of acceptance speeches by winning authors.)

About 200 books were nominated for the 1984 award when the single award for general nonfiction was restored.

== Multiple nonfiction categories (1964–1983) ==
For the 1963/1964 cycle, three new award categories replaced "Nonfiction": Arts and Letters; History and Biography; Science, Philosophy and Religion. For the next twenty years there were at least three award categories for nonfiction books marketed to adult readers and the term "Nonfiction" was used only 1980 to 1983 ("General Nonfiction", hardcover and paperback).

Scope of "Nonfiction" as covered in the following tables
timespan	of all awards	list of "Nonfiction" categories covered below
1964–1966	3 of 5	Arts and Letters; History and Biography; Science, Philosophy and Religion
1967–1968	3 of 6	Arts and Letters; History and Biography; Science, Philosophy and Religion
1969–1971	3 of 7	Arts and Letters; History and Biography; "The Sciences" or "Philosophy and Religion" alternating
1972–1975	6 of 10	Arts and Letters; Biography; Contemporary Affairs; History; Philosophy and Religion; The Sciences
1976	3 of 6	Arts and Letters; Contemporary Affairs; History and biography
1980	16 of 30+	Autobiography; Biography; Current Interest; General Nonfiction; History; Religion/Inspiration; Science
1977–1979	3 of 7	Biography and Autobiography; Contemporary Thought; History
1981–1983	8 of 20+	Autobiography/Biography; General Nonfiction; History; Science (each hardcover and paperback)

== Recipients ==
=== 1935–1940 ===
The National Book Awards for 1935 to 1940 annually recognized the "most distinguished" or "favorite" book of General Nonfiction or simply Nonfiction. In 1935 and 1936 there was distinct award to the most distinguished Biography; both winners were autobiographies. Meanwhile, four of the six general nonfiction winners were autobiographical and one more was a biography. Furthermore, all books were eligible for the "Bookseller Discovery" and "Most Original Book" (two awards); nonfiction winners are listed here. In 1937 and 1939 alone, the New York Times reported close seconds and runners up respectively.

There was only one National Book Award for 1941, the Bookseller Discovery, which recognized a novel; then none until their 1950 revival for 1949 books in three categories including general Nonfiction.

National Book Awards presented to nonfiction books, 1935–1940
Year	Category	Author	Title	Result	Ref.
1935	Nonfiction	Anne Morrow Lindbergh	North to the Orient	Winner	
1935	Nonfiction	Vincent Sheean	Personal History	Finalist	
1936	Most Original Book	Della T. Lutes	The Country Kitchen	Winner	
1936	Nonfiction	Van Wyck Brooks	The Flowering of New England: 1815–1865	Winner	
1937	Most Original Book	Carl Crow	Four Hundred Million Customers: The Experiences—Some Happy, Some Sad, of an American Living in China, and What They Taught Him	Winner	
1937	Nonfiction	Ève Curie	Madame Curie	Winner	
1937	Nonfiction	Lin Yutang	The Importance of Living (Note: The other three of four runners-up listed in New York Times coverage of the awards for 1937 were works of fiction, and Nonfiction was one of four award categories, so it is likely to call Lin Yutang, The Importance of Living runner up for the Nonfiction award. • That is not certain, for it does not match the NYT order of listing and mis-classification is possible. NYT lists four "close seconds" in order Conrad Richter, Sea of Grass; Kenneth Roberts, Northwest Passage; Lin Yutang, The Importance of Living; [Leo Rosten], The Education of Hyman Kaplan. Meanwhile, the four winners are identified by award category and listed in order Fiction, Nonfiction, Bookseller Discovery, Most Original. Both Sea of Grass and Northwest Passage are historical novels, which does not fit the second-listed category Nonfiction. The Importance of Living is nonfiction and also consistent with the third-listed winner, Bookseller Discovery. Hyman Kaplan is fiction and also consistent with the fourth-listed winner, Most Original.)	Finalist	
1938	Bookseller Discovery	David Fairchild	The World Was My Garden: Travels of a Plant Explorer	Winner	
1938	Most Original Book	Margaret Halsey	With Malice Toward Some	Winner	
1938	Nonfiction	Anne Morrow Lindbergh	Listen! The Wind	Winner	
1939	Nonfiction	Antoine de Saint-Exupéry	Wind, Sand and Stars	Winner	
1939	Nonfiction	Pierre van Paassen	Days of Our Years	Finalist	
1940	Bookseller Discovery	Perry Burgess	Who Walk Alone	Winner	
1940	Nonfiction	Hans Zinsser	As I Remember Him: The Biography of R.S.	Winner	

=== 1950s ===
The first awards in the current series were presented to the best books of 1949 at the annual convention dinner of the booksellers, book publishers, and book manufacturers in New York City, March 16, 1950. There were honorable mentions ("special citations") in the non-fiction category only.

National Book Awards presented to nonfiction books, 1950–1963
Year	Author	Title	Subject	Result	Ref.
1950	Ralph L. Rusk	The Life of Ralph Waldo Emerson	Ralph Waldo Emerson, American philosopher, essayist, and poet (1803–1882)	Winner	
1950	Lincoln Barnett	The Universe and Dr. Einstein		Finalist	
1950	Harry Allen Overstreet	The Mature Mind		Finalist	
1950	Eleanor Roosevelt	This I Remember	Eleanor Roosevelt, First Lady of the United States (1933–1945), diplomat, and activist	Finalist	
1950	Lillian Smith	Killers of the Dream		Finalist	
1950	Kenneth P. Williams	Lincoln Finds a General		Finalist	
1951	Newton Arvin	Herman Melville	Herman Melville, American writer and poet (1819–1891)	Winner	
1952	Rachel Carson	The Sea Around Us		Winner	
1953	Bernard De Voto,	The Course of Empire		Winner	
1954	Bruce Catton	A Stillness at Appomattox		Winner	
1955	Joseph Wood Krutch	The Measure of Man		Winner	
1956	Herbert Kubly	An American in Italy		Winner	
1957	George F. Kennan	Russia Leaves the War		Winner	
1958	Catherine Drinker Bowen	The Lion and the Throne	Edward Coke, English lawyer and judge	Winner	
1959	J. Christopher Herold	Mistress to an Age: A Life of Madame de Staël	Madame de Staël, Swiss/French author (1766–1817)	Winner	

=== 1960s ===
==== 1960–1963 ====
National Book Awards presented to nonfiction books, 1960–1963
Year	Author	Title	Subject	Result	Ref.
1960	Richard Ellmann	James Joyce	James Joyce, Irish novelist and poet (1882–1941)	Winner	
1961	William L. Shirer	The Rise and Fall of the Third Reich	Nazi Germany, Germany under control of the Nazi Party, 1933 to 1945	Winner	
1962	Lewis Mumford	The City in History: Its Origins, its Transformations and its Prospects		Winner	
1963	Leon Edel	Henry James	Henry James, American-born British writer and literary critic	Winner	

==== 1964–1969 ====
From 1964 to 1969, winners were presented by specific categories (e.g., Arts and Letters). However, finalists were presented in one general nonfiction category. Individual categories of finalists have been guessed.

===== Arts and Letters =====
National Book Awards presented to nonfiction books, Arts and Letters,1964–1969
Year	Author	Title	Subject	Result
1964	Aileen Ward	John Keats: The Making of a Poet	John Keats, English Romantic poet (1795–1821)	Winner
1964	Walter Jackson Bate	John Keats	John Keats, English Romantic poet (1795–1821)	Finalist
1964	Francis Steegmuller	Apollinaire: Poet among the Painters	Guillaume Apollinaire, French poet and writer	Finalist
1965	Eleanor Clark	The Oysters of Locmariaquer		Winner
1965	Eric Bentley	The Life of the Drama		Finalist
1965	Robert Brustein	The Theater of Revolt: An Approach to Modern Drama		Finalist
1965	Edward Dahlberg	Because I Was Flesh	Edward Dahlberg, American writer	Finalist
1965	Ralph Ellison	Shadow and Act		Finalist
1965	Howard Mumford Jones	O Strange New World: American Culture, the Formative Years		Finalist
1966	Janet Flanner	Paris Journal, 1944–1965		Winner
1966	Alfred Kazin	Starting Out in the Thirties		Finalist
1966	R. W. B. Lewis	Trials of the Word: Essays in American Literature and the Humanistic Tradition		Finalist
1966	Philip Rahv	The Myth and the Powerhouse		Finalist
1966	Lionel Trilling	Beyond Culture: Essays on Literature and Learning		Finalist
1966	René Wellek	History of Modern Criticism: 1750–1950		Finalist
1967	Justin Kaplan	Mr. Clemens and Mark Twain: A Biography	Mark Twain, American author and humorist (1835–1910)	Winner
1967	Oliver Larkin	Daumier: Man of His Time	Honoré Daumier, French artist (1808–1879)	Finalist
1967	Frederick A. Pottle	James Boswell: The Earlier Years	James Boswell, 18th-century Scottish lawyer, diarist, and author	Finalist
1967	Isaac Bashevis Singer	In My Father's Court	Isaac Bashevis Singer, Jewish American author (1903–1991)	Finalist
1967	Susan Sontag	Against Interpretation and Other Essays		Finalist
1967	Lawrance Thompson	Robert Frost: The Early Years	Robert Frost, American poet (1874–1963)	Finalist
1968	William Troy	Selected Essays		Winner
1968	R. P. Blackmur	A Primer of Ignorance		Finalist
1968	Frank Conroy	Stop-Time	Frank Conroy, American author	Finalist
1968	Leonard B. Meyer	Music, the Arts and Ideas		Finalist
1968	M. L. Rosenthal	The New Poets		Finalist
1968	Stanley Weintraub	Beardsley: A Biography	Aubrey Beardsley, English illustrator and author (1872–1898)	Finalist
1969	Norman Mailer	The Armies of the Night: History as a Novel, The Novel as History		Winner
1969	Hannah Arendt	Men in Dark Times		Finalist
1969	Peter Gay	Weimar Culture: The Outsider as Insider		Finalist
1969	Gordon S. Haight	George Eliot: A Biography	George Eliot, English novelist, essayist, poet and journalist (1819–1880)	Finalist
1969	Gertrude Himmelfarb	Victorian Minds		Finalist

===== History and Biography =====
Year	Author	Title	Subject	Result
1964	William H. McNeill	The Rise of the West: A History of the Human Community		Winner
1964	Shelby Foote	The Civil War: A Narrative, Vol. II, Fredericksburg to Meridian		Finalist
1964	Richard Hofstadter	Anti-intellectualism in American Life		Finalist
1964	Seymour Martin Lipset	The First New Nation: The United States in Historical and Comparative Perspective		Finalist
1964	Peter Lyon	Success Story: The Life and Times of S. S. McClure	S. S. McClure	Finalist
1964	Bertram D. Wolfe	The Fabulous Life of Diego Rivera	Diego Rivera, Mexican muralist (1886–1957)	Finalist
1965	Louis Fischer	The Life of Lenin	Vladmir Lenin, Russian politician, communist theorist and founder of the Soviet Union	Winner
1965	Oscar Lewis	Pedro Martinez: A Mexican Peasant and His Family		Finalist
1965	R. R. Palmer	Age of the Democratic Revolution: A Political History of Europe and America, 1760–1800		Finalist
1965	Willie Lee Nichols Rose	Rehearsal for Reconstruction: The Port Royal Experiment	Port Royal Experiment, program begun during the American Civil War in which former slaves successfully worked on the land abandoned by planters	Finalist
1965	Ernest Samuels	Henry Adams: The Major Phase	Henry Adams, American historian and Adams political family member (1838–1918)	Finalist
1965	Richard J. Whalen	The Founding Father: The Story of Joseph P. Kennedy	Joseph P. Kennedy	Finalist
1966	Arthur M. Schlesinger, Jr.	A Thousand Days: John F. Kennedy in the White House	John F. Kennedy, President of the United States from 1961 to 1963	Winner
1966	Irving Brant	The Bill of Rights: Its Origin and Meaning	United States Bill of Rights, First ten amendments to the US Constitution	Finalist
1966	Edward Chase Kirkland	Charles Francis Adams, Jr., 1835–1915: Patrician at Bay	Charles Francis Adams, Jr., American author and historian (1835–1915)	Finalist
1966	Richard B. Morris	The Peacemakers: The Great Powers and American Independence		Finalist
1966	Robert Shaplen	The Lost Revolution: The U.S. in Vietnam, 1946–1966	Vietnam War, Cold War conflict in Southeast Asia from 1955 to 1975	Finalist
1966	Theodore H. White	The Making of the President, 1964		Finalist
1967	Peter Gay	The Enlightenment, Vol. I: The Rise of Modern Paganism		Winner
1967	James H. Billington	The Icon and the Axe: An Interpretative History of Russian Culture		Finalist
1967	David Brion Davis	The Problem of Slavery in Western Culture		Finalist
1967	Martin Duberman	James Russell Lowell	James Russell Lowell, American poet, critic, editor, and diplomate (1819–1891)	Finalist
1967	Barrington Moore, Jr.	Social Origins of Dictatorship and Democracy: Lord and Peasant in the Making of the Modern World		Finalist
1967	Peter Štanský and William Abrahams	Journey to the Frontier: Two roads to the Spanish Civil War		Finalist
1968	George F. Kennan	Memoirs: 1925–1950	George F. Kennan, American diplomat, political scientist and historian (1904–2005)	Winner
1968	Henry Bragdon	Woodrow Wilson: The Academic Years	Woodrow Wilson, President of the United States from 1913 to 1921	Finalist
1968	Louis J. Halle	The Cold War as History		Finalist
1968	Roger Hilsman	To Move a Nation: The Politics of Foreign Policy in the Administration of John F. Kennedy	John F. Kennedy, President of the United States from 1961 to 1963	Finalist
1968	Nathan Silver	Lost New York	Former New York City buildings	Finalist
1969	Winthrop Jordan	White over Black: American Attitudes Toward the Negro, 1550–1812		Winner
1969	Nuel Pharr Davis	Lawrence and Oppenheimer	Ernest Lawrence, American nuclear physicist (1901–1958), and J. Robert Oppenheimer, American theoretical physicist (1904–1967)	Finalist
1969	Alvin M. Josephy, Jr.	The Indian Heritage of America		Finalist
1969	Norman Mailer	Miami and the Siege of Chicago: An Informal History of the Republic and Democratic Conventions of 1968		Finalist
1969	David M. Potter	The South and the Sectional Conflict	Origins of the American Civil War	Finalist

===== Science, Philosophy and Religion =====
National Book Awards: Nonfiction books, Science, Philosophy and Religion, 1964–1969
Year	Author	Title	Subject	Result
1964	Christopher Tunnard and Boris Pushkarev	Man-made America: Chaos or Control?		Winner
1964	James Baldwin	The Fire Next Time		Finalist
1964	Raymond Fredric Dasmann	The Last Horizon	Conservation biology, Study of threats to biological diversity	Finalist
1964	Howard Ensign Evans	Wasp Farm	Entomology, Scientific study of insects	Finalist
1964	Nathan Glazer and Daniel Patrick Moynihan	Beyond the Melting Pot: The Negroes, Puerto Ricans, Jews, Italians and Irish of New York City		Finalist
1964	Stewart Udall	The Quiet Crisis	Conservation of natural resources, Study of threats to biological diversity	Finalist
1965	Norbert Wiener	God & Golem, Inc.: A Comment on Certain Points Where Cybernetics Impinges on Religion		Winner
1965	Walter Ciszek	With God in Russia	Walter Ciszek, Polish-American Jesuit priest and missionary in the Soviet Union	Finalist
1965	Theodosius Dobzhansky	Heredity and the Nature of Man		Finalist
1965	David Hawkins	The Language of Nature: An Essay on the Philosophy of Science		Finalist
1965	John Courtney Murray	The Problem of God, Yesterday and Today		Finalist
1965	Walter S. Sullivan	We Are Not Alone: The Search for Intelligent Life on Other Worlds		Finalist
1966	Charles Frankel	"The Love of Anxiety" and Other Essays		Finalist
1966	Edgar Z. Friedenberg	Coming of Age in America		Finalist
1966	Bentley Glass	Science and Ethical Values		Finalist
1966	Alice Kimball Smith	A Peril and a Hope: The Scientists' Movement in America, 1945–47		Finalist
1967	Oscar Lewis	La Vida: A Puerto Rican Family in the Culture of Poverty—San Juan and New York	Culture of poverty, Social theory asserting that value systems perpetuate poverty	Winner
1967	Howard B. Adelmann	Marcello Malpighi and the Evolution of Embryology	Marcello Malpighi, Italian biologist and physician	Finalist
1967	George Beadle and Muriel Beadle,	The Language of Life: An Introduction to the Science of Genetics		Finalist
1967	Wassily W. Leontief	Essays in Economics		Finalist
1967	Philip Rieff	The Triumph of the Therapeutic: Uses of Faith After Freud		Finalist
1967	Erwin Straus	Phenomenological Psychology: The Selected Papers of Erwin W. Straus	Phenomenological Psychology, Psychological study of subjective experience	Finalist
1968	Jonathan Kozol	Death at an Early Age		Winner
1968	Theodosius Dobzhansky	The Biology of Ultimate Concern		Finalist
1968	John Kenneth Galbraith	The New Industrial State		Finalist
1968	Suzanne K. Langer	Mind: An Essay on Human Feeling		Finalist
1968	Lewis Mumford	The Myth of the Machine: Technics and Human Development		Finalist
1969	Robert Jay Lifton	Death in Life: Survivors of Hiroshima		Winner
1969	René Dubos	So Human an Animal: How We Are Shaped by Surroundings and Events		Finalist
1969	Frank E. Manuel	A Portrait of Isaac Newton	Isaac Newton, English physicist and mathematician (1642–1727)	Finalist
1969	Karl Menninger, M.D.	The Crime of Punishment		Finalist
1969	James D. Watson	The Double Helix: A Personal Account of the Discovery of the Structure of DNA		Finalist

=== 1970s ===
Throughout the 1970s, the National Book Award was separated into multiple categories.

==== Arts and Letters ====
National Book Award for Nonfiction: Arts and Letters, winners and finalists, 1970–1976
Year	Author	Title	Subject	Result
1970	Lillian Hellman	An Unfinished Woman: A Memoir	Lillian Hellman, American dramatist and screenwriter (1905–1984)	Winner
1970	Richard Howard	Alone with America: Essays on the Art of Poetry in the United States Since 1950		Finalist
1970	Noel Perrin	Dr. Bowdler's Legacy: A History of Expurgated Books in England and America	Expurgated books	Finalist
1970	John Unterecker	Voyager: A Life of Hart Crane	Hart Crane, American poet	Finalist
1970	Gore Vidal	Reflections Upon a Sinking Ship		Finalist
1971	Francis Steegmuller	Cocteau: A Biography	Jean Cocteau, French writer and filmmaker	Winner
1971	Harold Bloom	Yeats	W. B. Yeats, Irish poet and playwright (1865–1939)	Finalist
1971	Robert Coles	Erik H. Erikson: the Growth of His Work	Erik Erikson, American German-born psychoanalyst & essayist	Finalist
1971	Nancy Milford	Zelda	Zelda Fitzgerald, American novelist (1900–1948)	Finalist
1971	Lewis Mumford	The Myth of the Machine: The Pentagon of Power		Finalist
1971	Kenneth Rexroth	The Alternative Society: Essays from the Other World		Finalist
1972	Charles Rosen	The Classical Style: Haydn, Mozart, Beethoven		Winner
1972	M. H. Abrams	Natural Supernaturalism: Tradition and Revolution in Romantic Literature		Finalist
1972	James Dickey	Sorties		Finalist
1972	Thomas R. Edwards	Imagination and Power: A Study of Poetry on Public Themes		Finalist
1972	Norman Fruman	Coleridge, the Damaged Archangel	Samuel Taylor Coleridge, English poet, literary critic and philosopher (1772–1834)	Finalist
1972	César Graña	Fact and Symbol: Essays in the Sociology of Art and Literature		Finalist
1972	B. H. Haggin	Ballet Chronicle		Finalist
1972	Nathan Huggins	Harlem Renaissance	Harlem Renaissance, African-American cultural movement in New York City in the 1920s	Finalist
1972	Iris Origo	Images and Shadows	Iris Origo, British writer, 1902–1988	Finalist
1972	John Simon	Movies into Films: Film Criticism, 1967–1970		Finalist
1973	Arthur M. Wilson	Diderot	Denis Diderot, French Enlightenment philosopher, writer and encyclopædist (1713–1784)	Winner
1973	Leo Braudy	Jean Renoir: The World of His Films	Jean Renoir, French film director and screenwriter (1894–1979)	Finalist
1973	Arlene Croce	The Fred Astaire & Ginger Rogers Book	Fred Astaire and Ginger Rogers's musicals	Finalist
1973	Stanley Fish	Self-Consuming Artifacts: The Experience of Seventeenth-Century Literature		Finalist
1973	Michael Goldman	Shakespeare and the Energies of Drama	William Shakespeare, English poet, playwright, and actor (1564–1616)	Finalist
1973	Daniel Hoffman	Poe Poe Poe Poe Poe Poe Poe	Edgar Allan Poe, American writer and literary critic (1809–1849)	Finalist
1973	Albert Murray	South to a Very Old Place		Finalist
1973	Linda Nochlin	Realism		Finalist
1973	Harold Rosenberg	The De-Definition of Art: Action Art to Pop to Earthworks		Finalist
1973	Leo Steinberg	Other Criteria: Confrontations with Twentieth-Century Art		Finalist
1973	Lionel Trilling	Sincerity and Authenticity		Finalist
1973	Alec Wilder	American Popular Song: The Great Innovators, 1900–1950		Finalist
1973	Vernon Young	On Film: Unpopular Essays on a Popular Art		Finalist
1974	Pauline Kael	Deeper into Movies		Winner
1974	Daniel Aaron	The Unwritten War: American Writers and the Civil War		Finalist
1974	W. H. Auden	Forewords and Afterwords		Finalist
1974	Clarence Brown	Mandelstam	Osip Mandelstam	Finalist
1974	Richard Ellmann	Golden Codgers: Biographical Speculations		Finalist
1974	B. H. Haggin	A Decade of Music		Finalist
1974	Lillian Hellman	Pentimento: A Book of Portraits	Lillian Hellman	Finalist
1974	Edward Hoagland	Walking the Dead Diamond River	Dead Diamond River	Finalist
1974	Lincoln Kirstein	Elie Nadelman	Elie Nadelman	Finalist
1974	Leonard B. Meyer	Explaining Music: Essays and Explorations		Finalist
1974	Saul Steinberg	The Inspector		Finalist
1974	Kevin Starr	Americans and the California Dream, 1850–1915		Finalist
1975	Roger Shattuck	Marcel Proust	Marcel Proust	Winner
1975	Lewis Thomas	The Lives of a Cell: Notes of a Biology Watcher (Note: Lewis Thomas, The Lives of a Cell, won both the Arts & Letters and Science awards in 1975.)		Winner
1975	Calvin Bedient	Eight Contemporary Poets: Charles Tomlinson, Donald Davie, R. S. Thomas, Philip Larkin, Ted Hughes, Thomas Kinsella, Stevie Smith, W. S. Graham		Finalist
1975	Alessandra Comini	Egon Schiele's Portraits	Egon Schiele	Finalist
1975	Peter Gay	Style in History		Finalist
1975	Richard Gilman	The Making of Modern Drama: A Study of Büchner, Ibsen, Strindberg, Chekhov, Pirandello, Brecht, Beckett, Handke		Finalist
1975	Elizabeth Hardwick	Seduction and Betrayal		Finalist
1975	Marjorie L. Hoover	Meyerhold: The Art of Conscious Theater	Vsevolod Meyerhold	Finalist
1975	H. W. Janson	16 Studies	Art History	Finalist
1975	Eleanor Perényi	Liszt: The Artist as Romantic Hero	Franz Liszt	Finalist
1975	Oliver Strunk	Essays on Music in the Western World		Finalist
1976	Paul Fussell	The Great War and Modern Memory		Winner
1976	Lincoln Kirstein	Njinsky Dancing	Vaslav Nijinsky	Finalist
1976	Lawrence L. Langer	The Holocaust and the Literary Imagination		Finalist
1976	Robert Rosenblum	Modern Painting and the Northern Romantic Tradition: Friedrich to Rothko	Romanticism painting	Finalist
1976	Patricia Meyer Spacks	The Female Imagination		Finalist
1976	Leo Steinberg	Michelangelo's Last Paintings	Michelangelo	Finalist

==== History, biography, and Autobiography ====
In some years, the History and Biography awards were combined, while in others, they were two separate categories.

National Book Award for Nonfiction: History and Biography, winners and finalists, 1970–1979
Year	Category	Author	Title	Subject	Result
1970	History and biography	T. Harry William	Huey Long	Huey Long, American politician from Louisiana (1893–1935)	Winner
1970	History and biography	Dean Acheson	Present at the Creation: My Years in the State Department	Dean Acheson, American politician and lawyer (1893–1971)	Finalist
1970	History and biography	Townsend Hoopes	The Limits of Intervention	Townsend Hoopes, American historian and government official (1922–2004)	Finalist
1970	History and biography	John Womack	Zapata and the Mexican Revolution	Emiliano Zapata, Mexican revolutionary (1879–1919)	Finalist
1970	History and biography	Gordon S. Wood	The Creation of the American Republic		Finalist
1971	History and biography	James MacGregor Burns	Roosevelt: The Soldier of Freedom	Franklin D. Roosevelt, President of the United States from 1933 to 1945	Winner
1971	History and biography	David Herbert Donald	Charles Sumner and the Rights of Man	Charles Sumner, American abolitionist and statesman (1811–1874)	Finalist
1971	History and biography	Andy Logan	Against the Evidence: The Becker-Rosenthal Affair	Murder of Herman Rosenthal and subsequent trial	Finalist
1971	History and biography	Dumas Malone	Jefferson the President: First Term, 1801–1805	Thomas Jefferson, President of the United States from 1801 to 1809	Finalist
1971	History and biography	C. L. Sulzberger	The Last of the Giants		Finalist
1972	Biography	Joseph P. Lash	Eleanor and Franklin: The Story of Their Relationship, Based on Eleanor Roosevelt's Private Papers	Eleanor Roosevelt, First Lady of the United States (1933–1945), diplomat, and activist	Winner
1972	Biography	John Cody	After Great Pain: The Inner Life of Emily Dickinson	Emily Dickinson, American poet (1830–1886)	Finalist
1972	Biography	Emily Farnham	Charles Demuth: Behind A Laughing Mask	Charles Demuth, American painter	Finalist
1972	Biography	David Freeman Hawke	Benjamin Rush: Revolutionary Gadfly	Benjamin Rush, American Founding Father physician, educator, and author (1746–1813)	Finalist
1972	Biography	Ralph Ketcham	James Madison: A Biography	James Madison, President of the United States from 1809 to 1817	Finalist
1972	Biography	Harding Lemay	Inside, Looking Out: A Personal Memoir	Harding Lemay, American screenwriter	Finalist
1972	Biography	D'Arcy McNickle	Indian Man: A Life of Oliver La Farge	Oliver La Farge, American novelist	Finalist
1972	Biography	Ronald Paulson	Hogarth: His Life, Art, and Times	William Hogarth, English artist and social critic (1697–1764)	Finalist
1972	Biography	Lacey Baldwin Smith	Henry VIII: The Mask of Royalty	Henry VIII, King of England from 1509 to 1547	Finalist
1972	Biography	Barbara Tuchman	Stilwell and the American Experience in China, 1911-45		Finalist
1972	History	Allan Nevins	The Organized War, 1863–1864 and The Organized War to Victory, 1864–1865		Winner
1973	Biography	James Thomas Flexner	George Washington: Anguish and Farewell, 1793–1799	George Washington, First president of the United States	Winner
1973	Biography	Ingrid Bengis	Combat in the Erogenous Zone: Writings on Love, Hate, and Sex		Finalist
1973	Biography	Hortense Calisher	Herself	Hortense Calisher, American novelist	Finalist
1973	Biography	Kenneth S. Davis	FDR: The Beckoning of Destiny, 1882–1928	Franklin D. Roosevelt, President of the United States from 1933 to 1945	Finalist
1973	Biography	Leon Edel	Henry James: The Master, 1901–1916	Henry James, American-born British writer and literary critic	Finalist
1973	Biography	Eleanor Flexner	Mary Wollstonecraft: A Biography	Mary Wollstonecraft, English writer and intellectual (1759–1797)	Finalist
1973	Biography	Nikki Giovanni	Gemini: An Extended Autobiographical Statement on My First Twenty-Five Years of Being A Black Poet	Nikki Giovanni, American poet, writer and activist	Finalist
1973	Biography	John Houseman	Run-Through	John Houseman, British-American actor and film producer (1902–1988)	Finalist
1973	Biography	Diane Johnson	Lesser Lives	Mary Ellen Meredith, British novelist and poet of the Victorian era	Finalist
1973	Biography	George F. Kennan	Memoirs, 1950–1963		Finalist
1973	Biography	Joseph P. Lash	Eleanor: The Years Alone	Eleanor Roosevelt, First Lady of the United States (1933–1945), diplomat, and activist	Finalist
1973	Biography	Margaret Mead	Blackberry Winter: My Earlier Years		Finalist
1973	Biography	Peter Štanský and William Abrahams	The Unknown Orwell	George Orwell, English author and journalist (1903–1950)	Finalist
1973	History	Robert Manson Myers	The Children of Pride: A True Story of Georgia and the Civil War	Charles Colcock Jones, American Presbyterian clergyman, educator, and planter (1804–1863)	Winner
1973	History	Isaiah Trunk	Judenrat: The Jewish Councils in Eastern Europe under Nazi Occupation		Winner
1973	History	James David Barber	The Presidential Character: Predicting Performance in the White House		Finalist
1973	History	John Diggins	Mussolini and Fascism: The View from America		Finalist
1973	History	Richard Dunn	Sugar and Slaves: The Rise of the Planter Class in the English West Indies, 1624–1713		Finalist
1973	History	Loren Graham	Science and Philosophy in the Soviet Union		Finalist
1973	History	David Lovejoy	The Glorious Revolution in America	Dominion of New England, English regional government in North America, 1686–1689	Finalist
1973	History	Jerre Mangione	The Dream and the Deal: The Federal Writers Project, 1935–43		Finalist
1973	History	Robert O. Paxton	Vichy France: Old Guard and New Order, 1940–1944		Finalist
1973	History	Edward E. Rice	Mao's Way		Finalist
1974	Biography	John Leonard Clive	Thomas Babington Macaulay: The Shaping of the Historian (Note: In 1974 John Clive, Thomas Babington Macaulay, won both the History and Biography awards.)	Thomas Babington Macaulay	Winner
1974	Biography	Douglas Day	Malcolm Lowry: A Biography	Malcolm Lowry	Finalist
1974	Biography	J. H. Adamson and H. F. Folland	Sir Harry Vane: His Life and Times (1613–1662)	Henry Vane the Younger	Finalist
1974	Biography	Robert V. Bruce	Bell: Alexander Graham Bell and The Conquest of Solitude	Alexander Graham Bell	Finalist
1974	Biography	Stephen F. Cohen	Bukharin and the Bolshevik Revolution: A Political Biography, 1888–1938		Finalist
1974	Biography	Lester G. Crocker	Jean-Jacques Rousseau: The Prophetic Voice, Vol. II	Jean-Jacques Rousseau	Finalist
1974	Biography	Myra Friedman	Buried Alive: The Biography of Janis Joplin	Janis Joplin	Finalist
1974	Biography	William H. Harbaugh	Lawyer's Lawyer: The Life of John W. Davis	John W. Davis	Finalist
1974	Biography	Townsend Hoopes	The Devil and John Foster Dulles		Finalist
1974	Biography	Louis Sheaffer	O'Neill Volume II: Son and Artist	Eugene O'Neill	Finalist
1974	Biography	Kathryn Kish Sklar	Catherine Beecher	Catherine Beecher	Finalist
1974	Biography	Adam Ulam	Stalin	Joseph Stalin	Finalist
1974	History	John Leonard Clive	Thomas Babington Macaulay: The Shaping of the Historian	Thomas Babington Macaulay	Winner
1974	History	Ray Allen Billington	Frederick Jackson Turner: Historian, Teacher, Scholar	Frederick Jackson Turner	Finalist
1974	History	Daniel J. Boorstin	The Americans (Note: Boorstin published the third and final volume of The Americans in 1973 (The Americans: The Democratic Experience).)		Finalist
1974	History	Frank Freidel	Franklin D. Roosevelt (Note: Freidel published the fourth and final folume of Franklin D. Roosevelt in 1973 (ending 1934).)	Franklin D. Roosevelt	Finalist
1974	History	Lawrence M. Friedman	A History of American Law		Finalist
1974	History	Frederic C. Lane	Venice: Maritime Republic		Finalist
1974	History	Edward Pessen	Riches, Class and Power Before the Civil War		Finalist
1974	History	Richard Slotkin	Regeneration Through Violence: the Mythology of the American Frontier, 1600–1860		Finalist
1974	History	Stephan Thernstrom	The Other Bostonians: Poverty and Progress in the American Metropolis, 1880–1970		Finalist
1974	History	Robert C. Tucker	Stalin as Revolutionary, 1879–1929: A Study in History and Personality		Finalist
1975	Biography	Richard B. Sewall	The Life of Emily Dickinson	Emily Dickinson	Winner
1975	Biography	Richard Beeman	Patrick Henry: A Biography	Patrick Henry	Finalist
1975	Biography	Michael Collins	Carrying the Fire: An Astronaut's Journeys		Finalist
1975	Biography	Ben Maddow	Edward Weston: Fifty Years; The Definitive Volume of His Photographic Work	Edward Weston	Finalist
1975	Biography	James R. Mellow	Charmed Circle: Gertrude Stein and Company	Gertrude Stein	Finalist
1975	Biography	Francis Steegmuller	"Your Isadora": The Love Story of Isadora Duncan & Gordon Craig	Isadora Duncan and Gordon Craig	Finalist
1975	Biography	Wallace Stegner	The Uneasy Chair: A Biography of Bernard DeVoto	Bernard DeVoto	Finalist
1975	Biography	Richard M. Sudhalter and Philip R. Evans	Bix: Man and Legend	Bix Beiderbecke	Finalist
1975	Biography	Glenn Watkins	Gesualdo: The Man and His Music	Carlo Gesualdo	Finalist
1975	Biography	James A. Weisheipl	Friar Thomas D'Aquino: his life, thought, and work	Thomas Aquinas	Finalist
1975	History	Bernard Bailyn	The Ordeal of Thomas Hutchinson		Winner
1975	History	Paul Boyer and Stephen Nissenbaum	Salem Possessed: The Social Origins of Witchcraft		Finalist
1975	History	Robert Brentano	Rome Before Avignon		Finalist
1975	History	Shelby Foote	The Civil War: A Narrative		Finalist
1975	History	Eugene D. Genovese	Roll, Jordan, Roll: The World the Slaves Made		Finalist
1975	History	John R. Gillis	Youth and History: Tradition and Change in European Age Relations, 1750–Present		Finalist
1975	History	Erich S. Gruen	The Last Generation of the Roman Republic		Finalist
1975	History	Christopher H. Johnson	Utopian Communism in France		Finalist
1975	History	Gerald H. Meaker	The Revolutionary Left in Spain		Finalist
1975	History	Edward Shorter and Charles Tilly	Strikes in France, 1830–1968		Finalist
1975	History	Mira Wilkins	The Maturing of Multinational Enterprise		Finalist
1975	History	Peter H. Wood	Black Majority: Negroes in Colonial South Carolina from 1670 through the Stono Rebellion		Finalist
1976	History and Biography	David Brion Davis	The Problem of Slavery in the Age of Revolution, 1770–1823		Winner
1976	History and Biography	Paul Horgan	Lamy of Santa Fe	Jean Baptiste Lamy	Finalist
1976	History and Biography	R. W. B. Lewis	Edith Wharton	Edith Wharton	Finalist
1976	History and Biography	Charles S. Maier	Recasting Bourgeois Europe: Stabilization in France, Germany and Italy in the Decade after World War		Finalist
1976	History and Biography	Edmund S. Morgan	American Slavery, American Freedom		Finalist
1976	History and Biography	Richard Pipes	Russia Under the Old Regime		Finalist
1976	History and Biography	Frank R. Rossiter	Charles Ives and His America	Charles Ives	Finalist
1976	History and Biography	Martin J. Sherwin	A World Destroyed: Hiroshima and its Legacies		Finalist
1977	Biography and Autobiography	W. A. Swanberg	Norman Thomas: The Last Idealist	Norman Thomas	Winner
1977	Biography and Autobiography	Peter Collier and David Horowitz	The Rockefellers: An American Dynasty		Finalist
1977	Biography and Autobiography	Anaïs Nin	The Diary of Anaïs Nin: Volume VI 1955–1966	Anaïs Nin	Finalist
1977	Biography and Autobiography	B. L. Reid	The Lives of Roger Casement	Roger Casement	Finalist
1977	Biography and Autobiography	E. B. White	Letters of E. B. White	E. B. White	Finalist
1977	History	Irving Howe	World of Our Fathers: The Journey of the East European Jews to America and the Life They Found and Made		Winner
1977	History	Lawrence Goodwyn	Democratic Promise: The Populist Moment in America		Finalist
1977	History	Linda Gordon	Woman's Body, Woman's Right: The History of Birth Control in America		Finalist
1977	History	Richard Kluger	Simple Justice: The History of Brown v. Board of Education and Black America's Struggle for Equality		Finalist
1977	History	Joshua C. Taylor	America as Art		Finalist
1978	Biography and Autobiography	W. Jackson Bate	Samuel Johnson	Samuel Johnson	Winner
1978	Biography and Autobiography	James Atlas	Delmore Schwartz: The Life of an American Poet		Finalist
1978	Biography and Autobiography	Will D. Campbell	Brother to a Dragonfly		Finalist
1978	Biography and Autobiography	Will Durant and Ariel Durant	A Dual Autobiography		Finalist
1978	Biography and Autobiography	Frank Vandiver	Black Jack: The Life and Times of John J. Pershing		Finalist
1978	History	David McCullough	The Path Between the Seas: The Creation of the Panama Canal 1870–1914		Winner
1978	History	Henry Steele Commager	The Empire of Reason: How Europe Imagined and America Realized	Age of Enlightenment	Finalist
1978	History	Robert J. Donovan	Conflict and Crisis: The Presidency of Harry S. Truman, 1945–48	Harry S. Truman	Finalist
1978	History	Joseph Kastner	A Species of Eternity	Natural history in the New World	Finalist
1978	History	Fritz Stern	Gold and Iron	Gerson Bleichröder and Otto von Bismarck	Finalist
1979	Biography and Autobiography	Arthur M. Schlesinger Jr.	Robert Kennedy and His Times		Winner
1979	Biography and Autobiography	Donald Hall	Remembering Poets		Finalist
1979	Biography and Autobiography	William Manchester	American Caesar: Douglas MacArthur		Finalist
1979	Biography and Autobiography	William M. Murphy	Prodigal Father: The Life of John Butler Yeats		Finalist
1979	Biography and Autobiography	Phyllis Rose	Woman of Letters: A Life of Virginia Woolf	Virginia Woolf	Finalist
1979	History	Richard Beale Davis	Intellectual Life in the Colonial South, 1585–1763		Winner
1979	History	Reinhard Bendix	Kings or People: Power and the Mandate to Rule		Finalist
1979	History	Gordon A. Craig	Germany, 1866–1945		Finalist
1979	History	John H. White, Jr.	The American Railroad Passenger Car		Finalist
1979	History	Garry Wills	Inventing America: Jefferson's Declaration of Independence		Finalist

==== Philosophy and Religion ====
National Book Award for Nonfiction: Philosophy and Religion, winners and finalists, 1970–
Year	Author	Title	Subject	Result
1970	Erik Erikson	Gandhi's Truth: On the Origins of Militant Nonviolence		Winner
1970	Kenneth E. Boulding	Beyond Economics: Essays on Society, Religion, and Ethics		Finalist
1970	Loren Eiseley	The Unexpected Universe		Finalist
1970	Rollo May	Love and Will		Finalist
1970	Theodore Roszak	The Making of a Counter Culture: Reflections on the Technocratic Society and Its Youthful Opposition		Finalist
1971	No award presented			
1972	Martin E. Marty	Righteous Empire: The Protestant Experience in America		Winner
1973	S. E. Ahlstrom	A Religious History of the American People		Winner
1973	Silvano Arieti, M.D.	The Will to be Human		Finalist
1973	Germaine Brée	Camus and Sartre	Albert Camus and Jean-Paul Sartre	Finalist
1973	Arthur Danto	Mysticism and Morality: Oriental Thought and Moral Philosophy		Finalist
1973	Stanley Cavell	The Senses of Walden	Walden	Finalist
1973	William A. Christian	Person and God in a Spanish Valley		Finalist
1973	William Leiss	The Domination of Nature		Finalist
1973	Theodore Roszak	Where the Wasteland Ends		Finalist
1973	Morton White	Science and Sentiment in America		Finalist
1973	Theodore Ziolkowski	Fictional Transfigurations of Jesus		Finalist
1974	Maurice Natanson	Edmund Husserl: Philosopher of Infinite Tasks	Edmund Husserl	Winner
1974	Don Browning	Generative Man: Psychoanalytic Perspectives		Finalist
1974	Harvey Cox	The Seduction of the Spirit: The Use and Misuse of People's Religion		Finalist
1974	Erich Fromm	The Anatomy of Human Destructiveness		Finalist
1974	Marjorie Grene	Jean-Paul Sartre	Jean-Paul Sartre	Finalist
1974	Trent Schroyer	The Critique of Domination: The Origins and Development of Critical Theory	Critical theory	Finalist
1974	Laurence Veysey	The Communal Experience: Anarchist and Mystical Counter-Cultures in America	American communes	Finalist
1974	Frederic Wakeman	History and Will: Philosophical Perspectives of Mao Tse-Tung's Thought	Maoism	Finalist
1974	Harry Austryn Wolfson	Studies in the History of Philosophy and Religion, Vol. 1		Finalist
1974	Larzer Ziff	Puritanism in America: New Culture in a New World	New England Puritan	Finalist
1975	Robert Nozick	Anarchy, State, and Utopia		Winner
1975	Ian Barbour	Myths, Models and Paradigms		Finalist
1975	Leonard E. Barrett	Soul-Force: African Heritage in Afro-American Religion	Afro-American religion	Finalist
1975	John Murray Cuddihy	The Ordeal of Civility: Freud, Marx, Lévi-Strauss and the Jewish Struggle with Modernity	Modernization of European Jews or shtetl people	Finalist
1975	Philip Garvin and Julia Welch	Religious America		Finalist
1975	Guenter Lewy	Religion and Revolution		Finalist
1975	Barbara Myerhoff	Peyote Hunt: The Sacred Journey of the Huichol Indians	Huichol use of peyote	Finalist
1975	Jaroslav Pelikan	The Spirit of Eastern Christendom 600–1700	Eastern Christianity	Finalist
1975	Rosemary Radford Ruether	Faith and Fratricide: The Theological Roots of Anti-Semitism	Anti-Semitism	Finalist

==== The Sciences ====
National Book Award for Nonfiction: The Sciences, winners and finalists, 1971–
Year	Author	Title	Subject	Result
1971	Raymond Phineas Stearns	Science in the British Colonies of America		Winner
1971	Gustav Eckstein	The Body Has a Head		Finalist
1971	Victor C. Ferkiss	Technological Man		Finalist
1971	Ian L. McHarg	Design with Nature	Ecological land-use planning	Finalist
1971	Theodor Rosebury	Life on Man	Human skin as an ecosystem	Finalist
1972	George L. Small	The Blue Whale		Winner
1973	George B. Schaller	The Serengeti Lion: A Study of Predator-Prey Relations		Winner
1973	John E. Bardach, John H. Ryther and William O. McLarney	Aquaculture: the farming and husbandry of freshwater and marine organisms	Aquaculture, Farming of aquatic organisms	Finalist
1973	Herman H. Goldstine	The Computer from Pascal to Von Neumann	History of computing and history of computing hardware	Finalist
1973	Garrett Hardin	Exploring New Ethics for Survival: The Voyage of the Spaceship Beagle	Lifeboat ethics and bioethics	Finalist
1973	Morris Kline	Mathematical Thought from Ancient to Modern Times		Finalist
1973	Peter Matthiessen	The Tree Where Man Was Born	East Africa	Finalist
1973	H. Lewis McKinney	Wallace and Natural Selection	Alfred Russel Wallace, British naturalist (1823–1913)	Finalist
1973	Victor Richards, M.D.,	Cancer: The Wayward Cell; its origins, nature, and treatment	Cancer	Finalist
1973	Ann Zwinger and Beatrice Willard	Land Above the Trees: A Guide to American Alpine Tundra	Alpine tundra	Finalist
1974	S. E. Luria	Life: The Unfinished Experiment		Winner
1974	Jeremy Bernstein	Einstein	Albert Einstein, German-born physicist (1879–1955)	Finalist
1974	Theodosius Dobzhansky	Genetic Diversity and Human Equality		Finalist
1974	Amitai Etzioni	Genetic Fix: The Next Technological Revolution		Finalist
1974	J. M. Jauch	Are Quanta Real?: A Galilean Dialogue		Finalist
1974	Ruth Kirk and Louis Kirk	Desert: The American Southwest		Finalist
1974	Suzanne K. Langer	Mind: An Essay on Human Feeling, Vol. II		Finalist
1974	George Laycock	Autumn of the Eagle	Bald eagles	Finalist
1974	Robert I. Levy	Tahitians: Mind and Experience in the Society Islands		Finalist
1974	William T. Powers	Behavior: The Control of Perception		Finalist
1974	Edwin S. Shneidman	Deaths of Man		Finalist
1975	Silvano Arieti	Interpretation of Schizophrenia		Winner
1975	Lewis Thomas	The Lives of a Cell: Notes of a Biology Watcher		Winner
1975	Lewis Feuer	Einstein and the Generation of Science		Finalist
1975	Howard E. Gruber and Paul H. Barrett	Darwin on Man: A Psychological Study of Scientific Creativity		Finalist
1975	J. L. Heilbron	H. G. J. Moseley: The Life and Letters of an English Physicist, 1887–1915	Henry Moseley, English physicist	Finalist
1975	Richard S. Lewis	The Voyages of Apollo: The Exploration of the Moon	Apollo program	Finalist
1975	John McPhee	The Curve of Binding Energy		Finalist
1975	Stanley Milgram	Obedience to Authority: An Experimental View		Finalist
1975	Walter S. Sullivan	Continents in Motion: The New Earth Debate	Plate tectonics	Finalist
1975	Dorothy B. Vitaliano	Legends of the Earth: Their Geologic Origins	Geomythology	Finalist

==== Contemporary Affairs ====
National Book Award for Nonfiction: Contemporary Affairs, winners and finalists, 1972–
Year	Author	Title	Subject	Result
1972	Stewart Brand (editor)	The Last Whole Earth Catalogue		Winner
1973	Frances FitzGerald	Fire in the Lake: The Vietnamese and the Americans in Vietnam	Vietnam War, Cold War conflict in Southeast Asia from 1955 to 1975	Finalist
1973	Michael Barone, Grant Ujifusa and Douglas Matthews	The Almanac of American Politics		Finalist
1973	Herbert Block	Herblock's State of the Union		Finalist
1973	Lynn Eden	Crisis in Watertown: The Polarization of an American Community	Watertown, Wisconsin (1967–1969)	Finalist
1973	David Halberstam	The Best and the Brightest	Vietnam War, Cold War conflict in Southeast Asia from 1955 to 1975	Finalist
1973	Seymour Hersh	Cover-Up: The Army's Secret Investigation of the Massacre at My Lai 4	My Lai Massacre cover-up	Finalist
1973	Stanley Karnow	Mao and China: From Revolution to Revolution	Mao Zedong (founder of the People's Republic of Chinaa) nd China	Finalist
1973	Richard Sennett and Jonathan Cobb	The Hidden Injuries of Class	Working-class consciousness	Finalist
1973	Colin M. Turnbull	The Mountain People	Ik people	Finalist
1973	Garry Wills	Bare Ruined Choirs: Doubt, Prophecy, and Radical Religion		Finalist
1973	Garry Wills	Attica: The Official Report of the New York State Special Commission on Attica	Attica Prison riot	Finalist
1974	Murray Kempton	The Briar Patch: The People of the State of New York versus Lumumba Shakur, et al.	A Black Panthers's trial	Winner
1974	Peter Davies	The Truth About Kent State: A Challenge to the American Conscience	Kent State shootings	Finalist
1974	John Kenneth Galbraith	Economics and the Public Purpose		Finalist
1974	Vivian Gornick	In Search of Ali Mahmoud: An American Woman in Egypt		Finalist
1974	Walter Karp	Indispensable Enemies: The Politics of Misrule in America		Finalist
1974	Robert Jay Lifton	Home from the War: Vietnam Veterans—Neither Victims nor Executioners	US Vietnam veterans	Finalist
1974	Jessica Mitford	Kind and Usual Punishment: The Prison Business		Finalist
1974	Nora Sayre	Sixties Going on Seventies (Perspectives on the Sixties)	1960s	Finalist
1974	Arthur M. Schlesinger, Jr.	The Imperial Presidency	Presidential power in the United States	Finalist
1974	Robert Sherrill	The Saturday Night Special and Other Guns	Personal firearms	Finalist
1975	Theodore Rosengarten	All God's Dangers: The Life of Nate Shaw	Ned Cobb	Winner
1975	Raoul Berger	Executive Privilege: A Constitutional Myth	U.S. executive privilege	Finalist
1975	Carl Bernstein and Bob Woodward	All the President's Men	Watergate scandal	Finalist
1975	Robert Jean Campbell, M.D.	The Chasm: The Life and Death of a Great Experiment in Ghetto Education		Finalist
1975	Robert Caro,	The Power Broker: Robert Moses and the Fall of New York	Robert Moses	Finalist
1975	Joe Eszterhas	Charlie Simpson's Apocalypse	Harrisonville shooting	Finalist
1975	Middleton A. Harris with others (uncredited editor Toni Morrison)	The Black Book	"Printed scrapbook" of American "Negro historical materials"	Finalist
1975	Andrew Levinson	The Working Class Majority		Finalist
1975	Robert M. Pirsig	Zen and the Art of Motorcycle Maintenance: An Inquiry into Values		Finalist
1975	Franz Schurmann	The Logic of World Power: An Inquiry into the Origins, Currents, and Contradictions of World Politics		Finalist
1975	Rachel Scott	Muscle and Blood		Finalist
1975	Studs Terkel	Working		Finalist
1976	Michael J. Arlen	Passage to Ararat		Winner
1976	Richard Barnet and Ronald E. Muller	Global Reach: The Power of the Multinational Corporations	Multinational corporations	Finalist
1976	Peter L. Berger	Pyramids of Sacrifice: Political Ethics and Social Change		Finalist
1976	John Kenneth Galbraith	Money: Whence It Came, Where It Went	Money	Finalist
1976	W. Eugene Smith and Aileen M. Smith	Minamata	Minamata disease	Finalist
1976	Tim Wicker	A Time to Die		Finalist
1977	Bruno Bettelheim	The Uses of Enchantment: The Meaning and Importance of Fairy Tales		Winner
1977	Dorothy Dinnerstein	The Mermaid and the Minotaur: Sexual Arrangements and Human Malaise		Finalist
1977	Joseph Frank	Dostoyevsky: A Writer in His Time	Fyodor Dostoevsky, Russian novelist (1821–1881)	Finalist
1977	Ada Louise Huxtable	Kicked a Building Lately?		Finalist
1977	Rufus E. Miles, Jr.	Awakening from the American Dream		Finalist
1978	Gloria Emerson	Winners and Losers		Winner
1978	Kai T. Erikson	Everything in Its Path: Destruction of Community in the Buffalo Creek Flood	Buffalo Creek flood, 1972 dam failure in West Virginia	Finalist
1978	Michael Harrington	The Vast Majority		Finalist
1978	Louise Kapp Howe	Pink Collar Workers	Pink-collar workers, people working in the care-oriented careers	Finalist
1978	Julian Jaynes	The Origin of Consciousness in the Breakdown of the Bicameral Mind		Finalist
1979	Peter Matthiessen	The Snow Leopard		Winner
1979	Kenneth E. Boulding	Stable Peace	Peace science	Finalist
1979	Ivan Doig	This House of Sky: Landscapes of the Western Wind		Finalist
1979	Alfred Kazin	New York Jew		Finalist
1979	Meyer Schapiro	Modern Art: 19th and 20th Centuries		Finalist

=== 1980s ===
==== 1980–1983 ====
From 1980 to 1983 there were dual awards for hardcover (hc) and paperback (ppb) books in all nonfiction subcategories and some others. Most of the paperback award winners were second and later editions that had been previously eligible in their first editions. Here the first edition publication year is given parenthetically except the calendar year preceding the award is represented by "(new)". (Note: "(new)" implies that the book was not previously eligible for a National Book Award. It does not imply a paperback original or first publication in simultaneous hard and paper editions. There may have been a first hardcover edition earlier and award-winning paperback edition later in the calendar year. • No book was a finalist for hardcover and paperback awards in the same year.)

In 1980, the "Nonfiction" category included the following genres, each in both paperback and hardcover.

===== Autobiography and Biography =====
Year	Category	Author	Title	Subject	Result
1980	Autobiography Hardcover	Lauren Bacall	Lauren Bacall by Myself		Winner
1980	Autobiography Hardcover	Barbara Gordon	I'm Dancing As Fast As I Can	Valium addiction	Finalist
1980	Autobiography Hardcover	John Houseman	Front and Center		Finalist
1980	Autobiography Hardcover	William Saroyan	Obituaries		Finalist
1980	Autobiography Paperback	Malcolm Cowley	And I Worked at the Writer's Trade: Chapters of Literary History 1918–1978		Winner
1980	Biography Hardcover	Edmund Morris	The Rise of Theodore Roosevelt	Theodore Roosevelt, President of the United States from 1901 to 1909	Winner
1980	Biography Hardcover	Millicent Bell	Marquand: An American Life		Finalist
1980	Biography Hardcover	Leon Edel	Bloomsbury: A House of Lions		Finalist
1980	Biography Hardcover	Ernest Samuels	Bernard Berenson: The Making of a Connoisseur	Bernard Berenson, American art critic (1865–1959)	Finalist
1980	Biography Paperback	A. Scott Berg	Max Perkins: Editor of Genius	Maxwell Perkins, Book editor	Winner
1980	Biography Paperback	W. Jackson Bate	Samuel Johnson	Samuel Johnson, English writer and lexicographer (1709–1784)	Finalist
1980	Biography Paperback	William Manchester	American Caesar: Douglas MacArthur, 1880–1964	Douglas MacArthur, American military leader (1880–1964)	Finalist
1980	Biography Paperback	Arthur Schlesinger	Robert Kennedy and His Times		Finalist
1981	Hardcover	Justin Kaplan	Walt Whitman: A Life	Walt Whitman, American poet, essayist and journalist (1819–1892)	Winner
1981	Hardcover	Robert K. Massie	Peter the Great: His Life and World		Finalist
1981	Hardcover	James R. Mellow	Nathaniel Hawthorne in His Times	Nathaniel Hawthorne, American author (1804–1864)	Finalist
1981	Hardcover	Peter Štanský and William Abrahams	Orwell: The Transformation	George Orwell, English author and journalist (1903–1950)	Finalist
1981	Paperback	Deirdre Bair	Samuel Beckett: A Biography	Samuel Beckett, Irish writer (1906–1989)	Winner
1981	Paperback	E. K. Brown	Willa Cather: A Critical Biography	Willa Cather, American writer (1873–1947)	Finalist
1981	Paperback	Leon Edel	Bloomsbury: A House of Lions		Finalist
1981	Paperback	Maureen Howard	Facts of Life		Finalist
1981	Paperback	Meryle Secrest	Being Bernard Berenson		Finalist
1982	Hardcover	David McCullough	Mornings on Horseback	Theodore Roosevelt, President of the United States from 1901 to 1909	Winner
1982	Hardcover	Gay Wilson Allen	Waldo Emerson: A Biography	Ralph Waldo Emerson, American philosopher (1803–1882)	Finalist
1982	Hardcover	Dumas Malone	Jefferson and His Time: The Sage of Monticello		Finalist
1982	Hardcover	William S. McFeely	Grant: A Biography	Ulysses S. Grant, Civil War general and 18th president of the United States	Finalist
1982	Hardcover	Milton Rugoff	The Beechers		Finalist
1982	Paperback	Ronald Steel	Walter Lippmann and the American Century	Walter Lippmann, American journalist	Winner
1982	Paperback	Joseph P. Lash	Helen and Teacher: The Story of Helen Keller and Anne Sullivan Macy		Finalist
1982	Paperback	Robert K. Massie	Peter the Great: His Life and World		Finalist
1982	Paperback	Ted Morgan	Maugham	W. Somerset Maugham, English playwright and author (1874–1965)	Finalist
1982	Paperback	Ernest Samuels	Bernard Berenson: The Making of a Connoisseur	Bernard Berenson, American art critic (1865–1959)	Finalist
1983	Hardcover	Judith Thurman	Isak Dinesen: The Life of a Storyteller		Winner
1983	Hardcover	Russell Baker	Growing Up		Finalist
1983	Hardcover	Robert A. Caro	The Years of Lyndon Johnson: The Path to Power		Finalist
1983	Hardcover	Robert J. Donovan	Tumultuous Years: The Presidency of Harry S. Truman, 1949–1953		Finalist
1983	Hardcover	Lewis Mumford	Sketches from Life: The Autobiography of Lewis Mumford: The Early Years		Finalist
1983	Paperback	James R. Mellow	Nathaniel Hawthorne in His Times	Nathaniel Hawthorne, American author (1804–1864)	Winner
1983	Paperback	Dumas Malone	Jefferson and His Time: The Sage of Monticello		Finalist
1983	Paperback	Paul Mariani	William Carlos Williams: A New World Naked	William Carlos Williams, American poet (1883–1963)	Finalist
1983	Paperback	William S. McFeely	Grant: A Biography	Ulysses S. Grant, Civil War general and 18th president of the United States	Finalist
1983	Paperback	Jean Strouse	Alice James: A Biography	Alice James, American writer	Finalist

===== Current Interest =====
Year	Category	Author	Title	Subject	Result
1980	Hardcover	Julia Child	Julia Child and More Company	Julia Child, American cooking personality (1912–2004)	Winner
1980	Hardcover	Raymond Lifchez and Barbara Winslow	Design for Independent Living: The Environment and Physically Disabled People		Finalist
1980	Hardcover	Gay Gaer Luce	Your Second Life: Vitality and Growth in Middle and Later Years from the Experiences of the Sage Program		Finalist
1980	Hardcover	Nathan Pritikin with Patrick M. McGrady	The Pritikin Program for Diet and Exercise	Pritikin diet, a low-fat, high-fibre diet	Finalist
1980	Hardcover	Robert Ellis Smith	Privacy: How to Protect What's Left of It		Finalist
1980	Paperback	Christopher Lasch	The Culture of Narcissism: American Life in an Age of Diminishing Expectations		Winner
1980	Paperback	Frances Wells Burck	Babysense: A Practical and Supportive Guide to Baby Care		Finalist
1980	Paperback	Farallones Institute	The Integral Urban House: Self-Reliant Living in the City		Finalist
1980	Paperback	Tracy Hotchner	Pregnancy and Childbirth: The Complete Guide for a New Life		Finalist
1980	Paperback	Calvin Trillin	Alice, Let's Eat: Further Adventures of a Happy Eater		Finalist

===== General nonfiction =====
Year	Category	Author	Title	Subject	Result
1980	Hardcover	Tom Wolfe	The Right Stuff		Winner
1980	Hardcover	Frances FitzGerald	America Revised		Finalist
1980	Hardcover	David Halberstam	The Powers That Be		Finalist
1980	Hardcover	Frederic Morton	A Nervous Splendor: Vienna, 1888–1889		Finalist
1980	Hardcover	Thomas Powers	The Man Who Kept the Secrets: Richard Helms and the CIA	Richard Helms, U.S. Director of Central Intelligence (1966–1973)	Finalist
1980	Paperback	Peter Matthiessen	The Snow Leopard		Winner
1980	Paperback	Sissela Bok	Lying: Moral Choice in Public and Private Life		Finalist
1980	Paperback	Barry Lopez	Of Wolves and Men		Finalist
1981	Hardcover	Maxine Hong Kingston	China Men (Note: Wikipedia puts the book in genres "short-story cycle; historical fiction" and calls it a novel in her biography.)		Winner
1981	Hardcover	Malcolm Cowley	The Dream of the Golden Mountains: Remembering the 1930s		Finalist
1981	Hardcover	John Graves	From a Limestone Ledge		Finalist
1981	Hardcover	Victor S. Navasky	Naming Names	Hollywood blacklist	Finalist
1981	Hardcover	Studs Terkel	American Dreams: Lost and Found		Finalist
1981	Paperback	Jane Kramer	The Last Cowboy: Europeans and The Politics of Memory		Winner
1981	Paperback	Joan Didion	The White Album		Finalist
1981	Paperback	David Halberstam	The Powers That Be		Finalist
1981	Paperback	Dan Morgan	Merchants of Grain: The Power and Profits of the Five Giant Companies at the Center of the World's Food Supply		Finalist
1981	Paperback	Paul Theroux	The Old Patagonian Express		Finalist
1982	Hardcover	Tracy Kidder	The Soul of a New Machine		Winner
1982	Hardcover	Guy Davenport	The Geography of the Imagination: Forty Essays		Finalist
1982	Hardcover	James Fallows	National Defense		Finalist
1982	Hardcover	Janet Malcolm	Psychoanalysis: The Impossible Profession		Finalist
1982	Hardcover	Andrea Lee	Russian Journal		Finalist
1982	Paperback	Victor S. Navasky	Naming Names	Hollywood blacklist	Winner
1982	Paperback	Norman Cousins	Anatomy of an Illness As Perceived by the Patient: Reflections on Healing		Finalist
1982	Paperback	Edward Hoagland	African Calliope: A Journey to the Sudan		Finalist
1982	Paperback	Landon Jones	Great Expectations: America and the Baby Boom Generation		Finalist
1982	Paperback	Barbara Novak	Nature and Culture: American Landscape Painting, 1825–1875		Finalist
1983	Hardcover	Fox Butterfield	China: Alive in the Bitter Sea		Winner
1983	Hardcover	George F. Kennan	The Nuclear Delusion: Soviet-American Relations in the Atomic Age		Finalist
1983	Hardcover	David McClintock	Indecent Exposure: A True Story of Hollywood and Wall Street	Begelman affair	Finalist
1983	Hardcover	Jonathan Schell	The Fate of the Earth		Finalist
1983	Hardcover	Susan Sheehan	Is There No Place on Earth for Me?		Finalist
1983	Paperback	James Fallows	National Defense		Winner
1983	Paperback	Edwin R. Bayley	Joe McCarthy and the Press	Joseph McCarthy, American anticommunist politician (1908–1957)	Finalist
1983	Paperback	Paul Fussell	Abroad: British Literary Traveling Between the Wars		Finalist
1983	Paperback	Al Santoli	Everything We Had: An Oral History of the Vietnam War		Finalist
1983	Paperback	Joanna Stratton	Pioneer Women: Voices from the Kansas Frontier		Finalist

===== General reference =====
Year	Category	Author	Title	Subject	Result
1980	Hardcover	Elder Witt (editor)	Congressional Quarterly's Guide to the U.S. Supreme Court		Winner
1980	Hardcover	Frederic M. Kaplan, Julian M. Sopin, and Stephen Andors (eds.)	Encyclopedia of China Today		Finalist
1980	Hardcover	Bernard Karpel	Arts in America: A Bibliography		Finalist
1980	Hardcover	J. Gordon Melton	Encyclopedia of American Religions		Finalist
1980	Hardcover	Carolyn Sue Peterson and Ann D. Fenton (eds.)	Index to Children's Songs		Finalist
1980	Paperback	Tim Brooks and Earle Marsh	The Complete Directory to Prime Time Network and Cable TV Shows 1946–present		Winner
1980	Paperback	Cynthia W. Cooke, M.D., and Susan Dworkin	The Ms. Guide to a Woman's Health		Finalist
1980	Paperback	Solar Age magazine editors	The Solar Age Resource Book		Finalist
1980	Paperback	Stuart Berg Flexner	I Hear America Talking: An Illustrated History of American Words and Phrases		Finalist
1980	Paperback	Elisabeth L. Scharlatt (editor)	Kids: Day In and Day Out: a parents' manual		

===== History =====
Year	Category	Author	Title	Subject	Result
1980	Hardcover	Henry A. Kissinger	The White House Years		Winner
1980	Hardcover	Robert Dallek	Franklin D. Roosevelt and American Foreign Policy, 1932–1945	Franklin D. Roosevelt, President of the United States from 1933 to 1945	Finalist
1980	Hardcover	George F. Kennan	Decline of Bismarck's European Order: Franco-Russian Relations, 1875–1890		Finalist
1980	Hardcover	Frank E. Manuel and Fritzie P. Manuel	Utopian Thought in the Western World		Finalist
1980	Hardcover	Telford Taylor	Munich: The Price of Peace		Finalist
1980	Paperback	Barbara W. Tuchman	A Distant Mirror: The Calamitous 14th Century		Winner
1980	Paperback	James Lincoln Collier	The Making of Jazz: A Comprehensive History		Finalist
1980	Paperback	Daniel J. Kevles	The Physicists: The History of a Scientific Community in Modern America		Finalist
1980	Paperback	Allen Weinstein	Perjury: The Hiss–Chambers Case		Finalist
1980	Paperback	Theodore H. White	In Search of History: A Personal Adventure		Finalist
1981	Hardcover	John Boswell	Christianity, Social Tolerance and Homosexuality		Winner
1981	Hardcover	James H. Billington	Fire in the Minds of Men: Origins of the Revolutionary Faith		Finalist
1981	Hardcover	Steven Ozment	The Age of Reform, 1250–1550: An Intellectual and Religious History of Late Medieval and Reformation Europe		Finalist
1981	Hardcover	Carl E. Schorske	Fin-de-Siècle Vienna: Politics and Culture		Finalist
1981	Hardcover	Page Smith	The Shaping of America: A People's History of the Young Republic		Finalist
1981	Paperback	Leon F. Litwack	Been in the Storm So Long: The Aftermath of Slavery		Winner
1981	Paperback	Richard Drinnon	The Metaphysics of Indian-Hating and Empire-Building		Finalist
1981	Paperback	A. Leon Higginbotham, Jr.	In the Matter of Color: The Colonial Period		Finalist
1981	Paperback	Telford Taylor	Munich: The Price of Peace		Finalist
1981	Paperback	Howard Zinn	A People's History of the United States		Finalist
1982	Hardcover	Peter J. Powell	People of the Sacred Mountain: A History of the Northern Cheyenne Chiefs and Warrior Societies, 1830–1879		Winner
1982	Hardcover	Ray Huang	1587, a Year of No Significance: The Ming Dynasty in Decline		Finalist
1982	Hardcover	Donald Neff	Warriors at Suez: Eisenhower Takes America into the Middle East		Finalist
1982	Hardcover	Russell F. Weigley	Eisenhower's Lieutenants: The Campaign of France and Germany, 1944–1945		Finalist
1982	Hardcover	C. Vann Woodward (editor)	Mary Chestnut's Civil War		Finalist
1982	Paperback	Robert Wohl	The Generation of 1914		Winner
1982	Paperback	Malcolm Cowley	The Dream of the Golden Mountains		Finalist
1982	Paperback	Robert Dallek	Franklin D. Roosevelt and American Foreign Policy, 1932–1945	Franklin D. Roosevelt, President of the United States from 1933 to 1945	Finalist
1982	Paperback	Carl N. Degler	At Odds: Women and the Family in America from the Revolution to the Present		Finalist
1982	Paperback	Charles Rembar	The Law of the Land: The Evolution of Our Legal System		Finalist
1983	Hardcover	Alan Brinkley	Voices of Protest: Huey Long, Father Coughlin and the Great Depression		Winner
1983	Hardcover	Gordon A. Craig	The Germans		Finalist
1983	Hardcover	Robert Darnton	The Literary Underground of the Old Regime		Finalist
1983	Hardcover	John Putnam Demos	Entertaining Satan: Witchcraft and the Culture of Early New England		Finalist
1983	Hardcover	William H. McNeill	The Pursuit of Power: Technology, Armed Force and Society Since A.D. 1000		Finalist
1983	Hardcover	Bertram Wyatt-Brown	Southern Honor: Ethics and Behavior in the Old South		
1983	Paperback	Frank E. Manuel and Fritzie P. Manuel	Utopian Thought in the Western World		Winner
1983	Paperback	George M. Fredrickson	White Supremacy: A Comparative Study in American and South African History		Finalist
1983	Paperback	Ray Huang	1587, a Year of No Significance: The Ming Dynasty in Decline		Finalist
1983	Paperback	John Noble Wilford	The Mapmakers		Finalist

===== Religion/Inspiration =====
Year	Category	Author	Title	Subject	Result
1980	Hardcover	Elaine Pagels	The Gnostic Gospels	Gnostic Gospels	Winner
1980	Hardcover	Peter L. Berger	The Heretical Imperative: Contemporary Possibilities of Religious Affirmation		Finalist
1980	Hardcover	Brevard S. Childs	Introduction to the Old Testament as Scripture	Canonical criticism, Biblical interpretation that focuses on the text of the biblical canon itself	Finalist
1980	Hardcover	Peter Kreeft	Love Is Stronger Than Death		Finalist
1980	Hardcover	Jack B. Rogers and Donald K. McKim	The Authority and Interpretation of the Bible: An Historical Approach	Biblical authority	Finalist
1980	Paperback	Sheldon Vanauken	A Severe Mercy		Winner
1980	Paperback	Richard Bach	Illusions: The Adventures of a Reluctant Messiah		Finalist
1980	Paperback	Catherine Marshall	The Helper	Holy Ghost, part of the Trinity in Christianity	Finalist

===== Science =====
Year	Category	Author	Title	Result
1980	Hardcover	Douglas Hofstadter	Gödel, Escher, Bach: An Eternal Golden Braid	Winner
1980	Hardcover	Freeman Dyson	Disturbing the Universe	Finalist
1980	Hardcover	Douglas Faulkner and Richard Chesher	Living Corals	Finalist
1980	Hardcover	Bernd Heinrich	Bumblebee Economics	Finalist
1980	Hardcover	Horace Freeland Judson	The Eighth Day of Creation: Makers of the Revolution in Biology	Finalist
1980	Paperback	Gary Zukav	The Dancing Wu Li Masters: An Overview of the New Physics	Winner
1980	Paperback	William J. Kaufmann	Black Holes and Warped Spacetime	Finalist
1980	Paperback	Thomas S. Kuhn	The Essential Tension: Selected Studies in Scientific Tradition and Change	Finalist
1980	Paperback	Anne W. Simon	The Thin Edge: Coast and Man in Crisis	Finalist
1981	Hardcover	Stephen Jay Gould	The Panda's Thumb: More Reflections on Natural History	Winner
1981	Hardcover	Claude C. Albritton	The Abyss of Time: Changing Conceptions of the Earth's Antiquity after the Sixteenth Century	Finalist
1981	Hardcover	René Dubos	The Wooing of Earth	Finalist
1981	Hardcover	Timothy Ferris	Galaxies	Finalist
1981	Hardcover	Carl Sagan	Cosmos	Finalist
1981	Paperback	Lewis Thomas	The Medusa and the Snail: More Notes of a Biology Watcher	Winner
1981	Paperback	Carl Sagan	Broca's Brain: Reflections on the Romance of Science	Finalist
1981	Paperback	Joseph Silk	The Big Bang: The Creation and Evolution of the Universe	Finalist
1981	Paperback	Walter Sullivan	Black Holes: the Edge of the Space, the End of Time	Finalist
1982	Hardcover	Donald C. Johanson and Maitland A. Edey	Lucy: The Beginnings of Humankind	Winner
1982	Hardcover	Gene Bylinsky	Life in Darwin's Universe: Evolution and the Cosmos	Finalist
1982	Hardcover	Eric Chaisson	Cosmic Dawn: The Origins of Matter and Life	Finalist
1982	Hardcover	Steven J. Gould	The Mismeasure of Man	Finalist
1982	Hardcover	Steven M. Stanley	The New Evolutionary Timetable: Fossils, Genes and the Origin of Species	Finalist
1982	Paperback	Fred Alan Wolf	Taking the Quantum Leap: The New Physics for Nonscientists	Winner
1982	Paperback	Freeman Dyson	Disturbing the Universe	Finalist
1982	Paperback	Howard E. Gruber	Darwin on Man: A Psychological Study of Scientific Creativity	Finalist
1982	Paperback	Bernd Heinrich	Bumblebee Economics	Finalist
1982	Paperback	Guy Murchie	The Seven Mysteries of Life: An Exploration in Science & Philosophy	Finalist
1983	Hardcover	Abraham Pais	"Subtle is the Lord ...": The Science and the Life of Albert Einstein	Winner
1983	Hardcover	Philip J. Hilts	Scientific Temperaments: Three Lives in Contemporary Science	Finalist
1983	Hardcover	Melvin Konner	The Tangled Wing: Biological Constraints on the Human Spirit	Finalist
1983	Hardcover	Ernst Mayr	The Growth of Biological Thought: Diversity, Evolution and Inheritance	Finalist
1983	Hardcover	Heinz R. Pagels	Cosmic Code: Quantum Physics as the Language of Nature	Finalist
1983	Paperback	Philip J. Davis and Reuben Hersh	The Mathematical Experience	Finalist
1983	Paperback	Morris Kline	Mathematics: The Loss of Certainty	Finalist
1983	Paperback	Cynthia Moss	Portrait in the Wild: Animal Behavior in the Western World	Finalist
1983	Paperback	Berton Roueché	The Medical Detectives	Finalist
		G. Ledyard Stebbins	Darwin to DNA: Molecules to Humanity (new)	

==== 1983/1984 ====
1983 entries were published during 1982, the pattern established for 1949 books in 1950. Winners in 27 categories were announced April 13 and privately celebrated April 28, 1983.

The awards practically went out of business that spring. Their salvation with a reduced program to be determined was announced in November. The revamp was completed only next summer, with an autumn program recognizing books published during the award year (initially, preceding November to current October). There were no awards for books published in 1983 before November.

By this time the awards were sponsored by the book publishers alone. From 1980 (for 1979 books) they were termed "American Book Awards", and the National Book Awards were considered to have been discontinued after 1979.

1984 entries for the "revamped" awards in merely three categories were published November 1983 to October 1984; that is, approximately during the award year. Eleven finalists were announced October 17. Winners were announced and celebrated November 15, 1984.

==== 1984–1989 ====
National Book Award for Nonfiction winners and finalists, 1984–1989
Year	Author	Title	Subject	Result	Ref.
1984	Robert V. Remini	Andrew Jackson and the Course of American Democracy, 1833–1845	Andrew Jackson, President of the United States from 1829 to 1837	Winner	
1984	Howard M. Feinstein	Becoming William James	William James, American philosopher, psychologist, and pragmatist (1842–1910)	Finalist	
1984	Richard Marius	Thomas More: A Biography	Thomas More, English statesman and philosopher (1478–1535)	Finalist	
1984	Ernst Pawel	The Nightmare of Reason: A Life of Franz Kafka	Franz Kafka, Bohemian writer from Prague (1883–1924)	Finalist	
1984	Eudora Welty	One Writer's Beginnings	Eudora Welty, American short story writer, novelist and photographer	Finalist	
1985	J. Anthony Lukas	Common Ground: A Turbulent Decade in the Lives of Three American Families		Winner	
1985	Daniel J. Kevles	In the Name of Eugenics: Genetics and the Use of Human Heredity		Finalist	
1985	Walter A. McDougall	...the Heavens and the Earth: A Political History of the Space Age		Finalist	
1986	Barry Lopez	Arctic Dreams: Imagination and Desire in a Northern Landscape		Winner	
1986	John W. Dower	War Without Mercy: Race and Power in the Pacific War		Finalist	
1986	Richard Kluger	The Paper: The Life and Times of the New York Herald Tribune	New York Herald Tribune, Defunct American newspaper published in New York City	Finalist	
1986	Michael S. Reynolds	The Young Hemingway	Ernest Hemingway, American author and journalist (1899–1961)	Finalist	
1986	Theodore Rosengarten	Tombee: Portrait of a Cotton Planter		Finalist	
1987	Richard Rhodes	The Making of the Atomic Bomb		Winner	
1987	David Herbert Donald	Look Homeward: A Life of Thomas Wolfe	Thomas Wolfe, American novelist	Finalist	
1987	James Gleick	Chaos: Making a New Science		Finalist	
1987	Claudia Koonz	Mothers in the Fatherland		Finalist	
1987	Robert A.M. Stern, Gregory Gilmartin, and Thomas Mellins	New York 1930: Architecture and Urbanism Between the Two World Wars		Finalist	
1988	Neil Sheehan	A Bright Shining Lie: John Paul Vann and America in Vietnam	John Paul Vann, Lieutenant colonel in the United States Army, known for his role in the Vietnam War (1924–1972)	Winner	
1988	Eric Foner	Reconstruction: America's Unfinished Revolution, 1863–1877	Reconstruction era in the United States	Finalist	
1988	Peter Gay	Freud: A Life for Our Time	Sigmund Freud, Austrian neurologist and founder of psychoanalysis (1856–1939) (Note: The National Book Foundation website mistakenly lists Peter Gay's The Enlightenment: An Interpretation. Gay won the 1967 Award in History and Biography for the first volume of that work, subtitled The Rise of Modern Paganism. The second and third volumes were published in 1969 (The Science of Freedom) and 1973 (A Comprehensive Anthology).)	Finalist	
1988	Brenda Maddox	Nora: The Real Life of Molly Bloom	Molly Bloom, fictional character, wife of the main protagonist in James Joyce's 1922 novel Ulysses	Finalist	
1988	Jack McLaughlin	Jefferson and Monticello: The Biography of a Builder	Thomas Jefferson, President of the United States from 1801 to 1809, and Monticello, Jefferson's primary residence	Finalist	
1989	Thomas L. Friedman	From Beirut to Jerusalem		Winner	
1989	Taylor Branch	Parting the Waters: America in the King Years, 1954–63		Finalist	
1989	McGeorge Bundy	Danger and Survival: Choices about the Bomb in the First Fifty Years		Finalist	
1989	William Pfaff	Barbarian Sentiments: How the American Century Ends		Finalist	
1989	Marilynne Robinson	Mother Country: Britain, the Welfare State and Nuclear Pollution		Finalist	

=== 1990s ===
National Book Award for Nonfiction winners and finalists, 1990–1999
Year	Author	Title	Subject	Result	Ref.
1990	Ron Chernow	The House of Morgan: An American Banking Dynasty and the Rise of Modern Finance		Winner	
1990	Samuel G. Freedman	Small Victories: The Real World of a Teacher, Her Students and Their High School		Finalist	
1990	Roger Morris	Richard Milhous Nixon: The Rise of an American Politician	Richard Nixon, President of the United States from 1969 to 1974	Finalist	
1990	Steven Naifeh and Gregory White Smith	Jackson Pollock: An American Saga	Jackson Pollock, American abstract painter (1912–1956)	Finalist	
1990	T.H. Watkins	Righteous Pilgrim: The Life and Times of Harold L. Ickes, 1847–1952	Harold L. Ickes, American politician (1874–1952)	Finalist	
1991	Orlando Patterson	Freedom, Vol. 1: Freedom in the Making of Western Culture		Winner	
1991	E.J. Dionne, Jr.	Why Americans Hate Politics		Finalist	
1991	Melissa Fay Greene	Praying for Sheetrock		Finalist	
1991	R.W.B. Lewis	The Jameses: A Family Narrative	Henry James, American-born British writer and literary critic, and William James, American philosopher, psychologist, and pragmatist (1842–1910)	Finalist	
1991	Diane Wood Middlebrook	Anne Sexton: A Biography	Anne Sexton, American poet (1928–1974)	Finalist	
1992	Paul Monette	Becoming a Man: Half a Life Story	Paul Monette, American author, poet, and activist (1945–1995)	Winner	
1992	Edward L. Ayers	The Promise of the New South		Finalist	
1992	James Gleick	Genius: The Life and Science of Richard Feynman	Richard Feynman, American theoretical physicist (1918–1988)	Finalist	
1992	David McCullough	Truman	Harry S. Truman, President of the United States from 1945 to 1953	Finalist	
1992	Garry Wills	Lincoln at Gettysburg: The Words That Remade America	Gettysburg Address, Speech by U.S. President Abraham Lincoln	Finalist	
1993	Gore Vidal	United States: Essays 1952–1992		Winner	
1993	William Leach	Land of Desire: Merchants, Power, and the Rise of a New American Culture		Finalist	
1993	David Levering Lewis	W. E. B. Du Bois: Biography of a Race, 1868–1919	W. E. B. Du Bois, American sociologist, historian, socialist, activist, and writer	Finalist	
1993	Richard Slotkin	Gunfighter Nation: The Myth of the Frontier in Twentieth-Century America		Finalist	
1993	Peter Svenson	Battlefield: Farming a Civil War Battleground		Finalist	
1994	Sherwin B. Nuland	How We Die: Reflections on Life's Final Chapter		Winner	
1994	John Putnam Demos	The Unredeemed Captive: A Family Story from Early America		Finalist	
1994	Jane Mayer and Jill Abramson	Strange Justice: The Selling of Clarence Thomas	Clarence Thomas, US Supreme Court justice since 1991	Finalist	
1994	John Edgar Wideman	Fatheralong: A Meditation on Fathers, Sons, Race and Society		Finalist	
1994	Tobias Wolff	In Pharoah's Army: Memories of the Lost War	Tobias Wolff, American writer and educator	Finalist	
1995	Tina Rosenberg	The Haunted Land: Facing Europe's Ghosts After Communism		Winner	
1995	Dennis Covington	Salvation on Sand Mountain: Snake Handling and Redemption in Southern Appalachia		Finalist	
1995	Daniel C. Dennett	Darwin's Dangerous Idea: Evolution and the Meaning of Life		Finalist	
1995	Jonathan Harr	A Civil Action	Anderson v. Cryovac, 1986 US federal lawsuit concerning toxic contamination of groundwater	Finalist	
1995	Maryanne Vollers	Ghosts of Mississippi		Finalist	
1996	James P. Carroll	An American Requiem: God, My Father, and the War that Came Between Us		Winner	
1996	Melissa Fay Greene	The Temple Bombing		Finalist	
1996	Paul Hendrickson	The Living and the Dead: Robert McNamara and Five Lives of a Lost War	Robert McNamara, American businessman and Secretary of Defense	Finalist	
1996	Cary Reich	The Life of Nelson A. Rockefeller: Worlds to Conquer, 1908–1958	Nelson Rockefeller, Vice president of the United States from 1974 to 1977	Finalist	
1996	Anne Roiphe	Fruitful: A Real Mother in the Modern World		Finalist	
1997	Joseph J. Ellis	American Sphinx: The Character of Thomas Jefferson	Thomas Jefferson, President of the United States from 1801 to 1809	Winner	
1997	David I. Kertzer	The Kidnapping of Edgardo Mortara	Edgardo Mortara	Finalist	
1997	Jamaica Kincaid	My Brother		Finalist	
1997	Thomas Lynch	The Undertaking: Life Studies from the Dismal Trade	Funeral directors, Professionals involved in the business of funeral rites	Finalist	
1997	Sam Tanenhaus	Whittaker Chambers: A Biography	Whittaker Chambers, Defected communist spy, writer, editor (1901–1961)	Finalist	
1998	Edward Ball	Slaves in the Family		Winner	
1998	Harold Bloom	Shakespeare: The Invention of the Human	William Shakespeare, English poet, playwright, and actor (1564–1616)	Finalist	
1998	Yaffa Eliach	There Once Was a World: A 900-Year Chronicle of the Shtetl of Eishyshok	Jewish Eishyshok	Finalist	
1998	Beth Kephart	A Slant of Sun: One Child's Courage		Finalist	
1998	Henry Mayer	All on Fire: William Lloyd Garrison and the Abolition of Slavery	William Lloyd Garrison, American journalist and abolitionist (1805–1879)	Finalist	
1999	John W. Dower	Embracing Defeat: Japan in the Wake of World War II		Winner	
1999	Natalie Angier	Woman: An Intimate Geography		Finalist	
1999	Mark Bowden	Black Hawk Down: A Story of Modern War		Finalist	
1999	John Phillip Santos	Places Left Unfinished at the Time of Creation	John Phillip Santos, American freelance filmmaker, producer, journalist, author	Finalist	
1999	Judith Thurman	Secrets of the Flesh: A Life of Colette	Colette, French novelist	Finalist	

=== 2000s ===
National Book Award for Nonfiction winners and finalists, 2000–2009
Year	Author	Title	Subject	Result	Ref.
2000	Nathaniel Philbrick	In the Heart of the Sea: The Tragedy of the Whaleship Essex	Whaleship Essex, American whaleship from Nantucket, Massachusetts	Winner	
2000	Jacques Barzun	From Dawn to Decadence: 500 Years of Western Cultural Life, 1500 to the Present		Finalist	
2000	Alice Kaplan	The Collaborator: The Trial and Execution of Robert Brasillach	Robert Brasillach, French writer and journalist	Finalist	
2000	David Levering Lewis	W.E.B. Du Bois: The Fight for Equality and the American Century, 1919–1963	W.E.B. Du Bois, American sociologist, historian, socialist, activist, and writer	Finalist	
2000	Patrick Tierney (Note: Patrick Tierney's book was later determined to be deliberately fraudulent.)	Darkness in El Dorado: How Scientists and Journalists Devastated the Amazon		Finalist	
2001	Andrew Solomon	The Noonday Demon: An Atlas of Depression		Winner	
2001	Marie Arana	American Chica: Two Worlds, One Childhood		Finalist	
2001	Nina Bernstein	The Lost Children of Wilder: The Epic Struggle to Change Foster Care		Finalist	
2001	David James Duncan	My Story as Told by Water		Finalist	
2001	Jan T. Gross	Neighbors: The Destruction of the Jewish Community in Jedwabne, Poland		Finalist	
2002	Robert A. Caro	Master of the Senate: The Years of Lyndon Johnson	Lyndon B. Johnson, President of the United States from 1963 to 1969	Winner	
2002	Devra Davis	When Smoke Ran Like Water: Tales of Environmental Deception and the Battle Against Pollution	1948 Donora smog, Major Pennsylvania air pollution incident	Finalist	
2002	Atul Gawande	Complications: A Surgeon's Notes on an Imperfect Science		Finalist	
2002	Elizabeth Gilbert	The Last American Man	Eustace Conway	Finalist	
2002	Steve Olson	Mapping Human History: Discovering the Past through Our Genes		Finalist	
2003	Carlos Eire	Waiting for Snow in Havana: Confessions of a Cuban Boy		Winner	
2003	Anne Applebaum	Gulag: A History		Finalist	
2003	George Howe Colt	The Big House: A Century in the Life of an American Summer Home		Finalist	
2003	John D'Emilio	Lost Prophet: The Life and Times of Bayard Rustin	Bayard Rustin, American civil rights activist (1912–1987)	Finalist	
2003	Erik Larson	The Devil in the White City: Murder, Magic, and Madness at the Fair that Changed America		Finalist	
2004	Kevin Boyle	Arc of Justice: A Saga of Race, Civil Rights, and Murder in the Jazz Age		Winner	
2004	David Hackett Fischer	Washington's Crossing		Finalist	
2004	Jennifer Gonnerman	Life on the Outside: The Prison Odyssey of Elaine Bartlett		Finalist	
2004	Stephen Greenblatt	Will in the World: How Shakespeare Became Shakespeare	William Shakespeare, English poet, playwright, and actor (1564–1616)	Finalist	
2004	9/11 Commission	9/11 Commission Report	The 9/11 Commission's final report on the September 11 attacks	Finalist	
2005	Joan Didion	The Year of Magical Thinking	Joan Didion, American writer (1934–2021)	Winner	
2005	Alan Burdick	Out of Eden: An Odyssey of Ecological Invasion		Finalist	
2005	Leo Damrosch	Jean-Jacques Rousseau: Restless Genius	Jean-Jacques Rousseau, Genevan philosopher, writer, and composer (1712–1778)	Finalist	
2005	Jim Dwyer and Kevin Flynn	102 Minutes: The Untold Story of the Fight to Survive Inside the Twin Towers	September 11 attacks, 2001 Islamist terrorist attacks in the United States	Finalist	
2005	Adam Hochschild	Bury the Chains: Prophets and Rebels in the Fight to Free an Empire's Slaves		Finalist	
2006	Timothy Egan	The Worst Hard Time: The Untold Story of Those Who Survived the Great American Dust Bowl		Winner	
2006	Taylor Branch	At Canaan's Edge: America in the King Years, 1965-68		Finalist	
2006	Rajiv Chandrasekaran	Imperial Life in the Emerald City: Inside Iraq's Green Zone	Iraq's Green Zone, Area in Baghdad, Iraq	Finalist	
2006	Peter Hessler	Oracle Bones: A Journey Between China's Past and Present		Finalist	
2006	Lawrence Wright	The Looming Tower: Al-Qaeda and the Road to 9/11	Al-Qaeda, Salafi jihadist organization founded in 1988	Finalist	
2007	Tim Weiner	Legacy of Ashes: The History of the CIA	Central Intelligence Agency, National intelligence agency of the United States	Winner	
2007	Edwidge Danticat	Brother, I'm Dying	Edwidge Danticat, Haitian-American writer	Finalist	
2007	Christopher Hitchens	God Is Not Great: How Religion Poisons Everything		Finalist	
2007	Woody Holton	Unruly Americans and the Origins of the Constitution		Finalist	
2007	Arnold Rampersad	Ralph Ellison: A Biography	Ralph Ellison, American novelist, literary critic, scholar and writer (1913–1994)	Finalist	
2008	Annette Gordon-Reed	The Hemingses of Monticello: An American Family		Winner	
2008	Drew Gilpin Faust	This Republic of Suffering: Death and the American Civil War	American Civil War, 1861–1865 conflict in the United States	Finalist	
2008	Jane Mayer	The Dark Side: The Inside Story of How the War on Terror Turned into a War on American Ideals	War on terror, Ongoing international military campaign following the September 11 attacks	Finalist	
2008	Jim Sheeler	Final Salute: A Story of Unfinished Lives		Finalist	
2008	Joan Wickersham	The Suicide Index: Putting My Father's Death in Order		Finalist	
2009	T. J. Stiles	The First Tycoon: The Epic Life of Cornelius Vanderbilt	Cornelius Vanderbilt, American businessman and tycoon (1794–1877)	Winner	
2009	David M. Carroll	Following the Water: A Hydromancer's Notebook		Finalist	
2009	Sean B. Carroll	Remarkable Creatures: Epic Adventures in the Search for the Origins of Species		Finalist	
2009	Greg Grandin	Fordlândia: The Rise and Fall of Henry Ford's Forgotten Jungle City	Fordlândia, Village in Pará, Brazil	Finalist	
2009	Adrienne Mayor	The Poison King: The Life and Legend of Mithradates, Rome's Deadliest Enemy	Mithradates, King of Pontus from 120 to 63 BC	Finalist	

=== 2010s ===
National Book Award for Nonfiction winners and finalists, 2010–2019
Year	Author	Title	Subject	Result	Ref.
2010	Patti Smith	Just Kids	Robert Mapplethorpe, American photographer	Winner	
2010	Barbara Demick	Nothing to Envy: Ordinary Lives in North Korea	North Korea, Country in East Asia	Finalist	
2010	John W. Dower	Cultures of War: Pearl Harbor, Hiroshima, 9-11, Iraq		Finalist	
2010	Justin Spring	Secret Historian: The Life and Times of Samuel Steward, Professor, Tattoo Artist, and Sexual Renegade	Samuel Steward, American poet, novelist, tattoo artist	Finalist	
2010	Megan K. Stack	Every Man in This Village Is a Liar: An Education in War		Finalist	
2011	Stephen Greenblatt	The Swerve: How the World Became Modern		Winner	
2011	Deborah Baker	The Convert: A Tale of Exile and Extremism	Maryam Jameelah, American writer	Finalist	
2011	Mary Gabriel	Love and Capital: Karl and Jenny Marx and the Birth of a Revolution	Karl Marx, German philosopher (1818–1883), and Jenny von Westphalen, German theatre critic and political activist	Finalist	
2011	Manning Marable	Malcolm X: A Life of Reinvention	Malcolm X, African-American human rights activist (1925–1965)	Finalist	
2011	Lauren Redniss	Radioactive: Marie & Pierre Curie, A Tale of Love & Fallout	Marie Curie, Polish-French physicist and chemist (1867–1934), and Pierre Curie, French physicist (1859–1906)	Finalist	
2012	Katherine Boo	Behind the Beautiful Forevers: Life, Death, and Hope in a Mumbai Undercity	Mumbai, Capital of Maharashtra, India	Winner	
2012	Anne Applebaum	Iron Curtain: The Crushing of Eastern Europe, 1945–1956		Finalist	
2012	Robert A. Caro	The Passage of Power: The Years of Lyndon Johnson	Lyndon B. Johnson, President of the United States from 1963 to 1969	Finalist	
2012	Domingo Martinez	The Boy Kings of Texas		Finalist	
2012	Anthony Shadid	House of Stone: A Memoir of Home, Family, and a Lost Middle East	Anthony Shadid, American journalist	Finalist	
2013	George Packer	The Unwinding: An Inner History of the New America		Winner	
2013	Jill Lepore	Book of Ages: The Life and Opinions of Jane Franklin	Jane Franklin Mecom, 18th-century American and sister of Benjamin Franklin	Finalist	
2013	Wendy Lower	Hitler's Furies: German Women in the Nazi Killing Fields		Finalist	
2013	Alan Taylor	The Internal Enemy: Slavery and War in Virginia, 1772–1832		Finalist	
2013	Lawrence Wright	Going Clear: Scientology, Hollywood, and the Prison of Belief		Finalist	
2014	Evan Osnos	Age of Ambition: Chasing Fortune, Truth, and Faith in the New China		Winner	
2014	Roz Chast	Can't We Talk About Something More Pleasant?		Finalist	
2014	Anand Gopal	No Good Men Among The Living		Finalist	
2014	John Lahr	Tennessee Williams: Mad Pilgrimage of the Flesh	Tennessee Williams, American playwright (1911–1983)	Finalist	
2014	E.O. Wilson	The Meaning of Human Existence		Finalist	
2015	Ta-Nehisi Coates	Between the World and Me		Winner	
2015	Sally Mann	Hold Still: A Memoir with Photographs		Finalist	
2015	Sy Montgomery	The Soul of an Octopus: A Surprising Exploration into the Wonder of Consciousness		Finalist	
2015	Carla Power	If the Oceans Were Ink: An Unlikely Friendship and a Journey to the Heart of the Quran		Finalist	
2015	Tracy K. Smith	Ordinary Light: A Memoir	Tracy K. Smith, American poet	Finalist	
2016	Ibram X. Kendi	Stamped from the Beginning: The Definitive History of Racist Ideas in America		Winner	
2016	Arlie Russell Hochschild	Strangers in Their Own Land: Anger and Mourning on the American Right		Finalist	
2016	Viet Thanh Nguyen	Nothing Ever Dies: Vietnam and the Memory of War		Finalist	
2016	Andrés Reséndez	The Other Slavery: The Uncovered Story of Indian Enslavement in America		Finalist	
2016	Heather Ann Thompson	Blood in the Water: The Attica Prison Uprising of 1971 and Its Legacy	Attica Prison riot, 1971 prisoner rebellion, Attica, New York prison	Finalist	
2017	Masha Gessen	The Future Is History: How Totalitarianism Reclaimed Russia		Winner	
2017	Erica Armstrong Dunbar	Never Caught: The Washingtons’ Relentless Pursuit of Their Runaway Slave, Ona Judge		Finalist	
2017	Frances FitzGerald	The Evangelicals: The Struggle to Shape America		Finalist	
2017	David Grann	Killers of the Flower Moon: The Osage Murders and the Birth of the FBI	Osage Indian murders, Series of murders of Osage Indians in Osage County, Oklahoma	Finalist	
2017	Nancy MacLean	Democracy in Chains: The Deep History of the Radical Right's Stealth Plan for America		Finalist	
2018	Jeffrey C. Stewart	The New Negro: The Life of Alain Locke	Alain LeRoy Locke, American philosopher and writer (1885–1954)	Winner	
2018	Colin G. Calloway	The Indian World of George Washington: The First President, the First Americans, and the Birth of the Nation		Finalist	
2018	Victoria Johnson	American Eden: David Hosack, Botany, and Medicine in the Garden of the Early Republic	David Hosack, American physician, botanist, and educator (1769–1835)	Finalist	
2018	Sarah Smarsh	Heartland: A Memoir of Working Hard and Being Broke in the Richest Country on Earth		Finalist	
2018	Adam Winkler	We the Corporations: How American Businesses Won Their Civil Rights	Corporate personhood and the rights of corporations under the U.S. Constitution	Finalist	
2019	Sarah M. Broom	The Yellow House		Winner	
2019	Tressie McMillan Cottom	Thick: And Other Essays		Finalist	
2019	Carolyn Forché	What You Have Heard is True: A Memoir of Witness and Resistance		Finalist	
2019	David Treuer	The Heartbeat of Wounded Knee: Native America from 1890 to the Present		Finalist	
2019	Albert Woodfox with Leslie George	Solitary	Solitary confinement, Strict imprisonment form	Finalist	

=== 2020s ===
National Book Award for Nonfiction winners and finalists, 2020–2029
Year	Author	Title	Subject	Result	Ref.
2020	Les Payne and Tamara Payne	The Dead Are Arising: The Life of Malcolm X	Malcolm X, African-American human rights activist (1925–1965)	Winner	
2020	Claudio Saunt	Unworthy Republic: The Dispossession of Native Americans and the Road to Indian Territory	President Andrew Jackson's Indian Removal Act of 1830	Finalist	
2020	Jenn Shapland	My Autobiography of Carson McCullers: A Memoir	An intermingled autobiography and biography of Carson McCullers	Finalist	
2020	Karla Cornejo Villavicencio	The Undocumented Americans	Part memoir, part essays about undocumented day laborers	Finalist	
2020	Jerald Walker	How To Make a Slave and Other Essays	A collection of autobiographical vignettes	Finalist	
2021	Tiya Miles	All That She Carried: The Journey of Ashley's Sack, a Black Family Keepsake	Ashley's Sack, a mid-1800s cloth sack embroidered with the account of a slave sale of a 9-year-old girl	Winner	
2021	Hanif Abdurraqib	A Little Devil in America: Notes in Praise of Black Performance	A collection of essays about black culture in America	Finalist	
2021	Lucas Bessire	Running Out: In Search of Water on the High Plains	The author's journey to his ancestral home of southwest Kansas, and the depletion of the Ogallala Aquifer	Finalist	
2021	Grace M. Cho	Tastes Like War: A Memoir	The link between food and mental health	Finalist	
2021	Nicole Eustace	Covered with Night: A Story of Murder and Indigenous Justice in Early America	The murder of an indigenous hunter and the eventual trial which led to the Great Treaty of 1722	Finalist	
2022	Imani Perry	South to America: A Journey Below the Mason-Dixon To Understand the Soul of a Nation	A chronicle of the author's journey to her native Alabama, positing the idea that to better understand America, one must first understand the American South.	Winner	
2022	Meghan O'Rourke	The Invisible Kingdom: Reimagining Chronic Illness	A memoir detailing the author's long struggle with debilitating chronic illness and the medical system's inadequacy in properly diagnosing and treating her.	Finalist	
2022	David Quammen	Breathless: The Scientific Race To Defeat a Deadly Virus	The lead-up to the COVID-19 pandemic	Finalist	
2022	Ingrid Rojas Contreras	The Man Who Could Move Clouds: A Memoir	The author recalls her grandfather using his healing gift to talk to the dead, predicting the future and "moving the clouds"	Finalist	
2022	Robert Samuels and Toluse Olorunnipa	His Name Is George Floyd: One Man’s Life and the Struggle for Racial Justice	Biography of George Floyd (1973–2020), an African-American man murdered by a police officer	Finalist	
2023	Ned Blackhawk	The Rediscovery of America: Native Peoples and the Unmaking of US History	The central role of Native Americans in the formation and development of the USA	Winner	
2023	Cristina Rivera Garza	Liliana's Invincible Summer: A Sister's Search for Justice	The murder of the author's sister in Mexico City by an ex-boyfriend	Finalist	
2023	Christina Sharpe	Ordinary Notes	The legacy of white supremacy	Finalist	
2023	Raja Shehadeh	We Could Have Been Friends, My Father and I: A Palestinian Memoir	Aziz Shehadeh, a Palestinian human rights activist who was assassinated in 1985 outside his home in Ramallah	Finalist	
2023	John Vaillant	Fire Weather: A True Story from a Hotter World	The 2016 Fort McMurray wildfire as a window to a future of climate catastrophe	Finalist	
2024	Jason De León	Soldiers and Kings: Survival and Hope in the World of Human Smuggling	Smugglers from Honduras who tried to get migrants across the Mexican border and into the USA	Winner	
2024	Eliza Griswold	Circle of Hope: A Reckoning With Love, Power, and Justice in an American Church	A portrait of a church in Philadelphia as it descended into crisis over issues of race and sexuality	Finalist	
2024	Kate Manne	Unshrinking: How to Face Fatphobia	The bias against body size. "Part memoir, part polemic, and part (all?) philosophy."	Finalist	
2024	Salman Rushdie	Knife: Meditations After an Attempted Murder	The attack in 2022 when the author was stabbed by an Islamic fundamentalist at an appearance in Chautauqua, New York, and his recovery since then	Finalist	
2024	Deborah Jackson Taffa	Whiskey Tender	A memoir of the author's life from 1972, when she was 3, to 1987, when she graduated from high school, interwoven with a history of Native American oppression and survival	Finalist	
2025	Omar El Akkad	One Day, Everyone Will Have Always Been Against This		Winner	
2025	Julia Ioffe	Motherland: A Feminist History of Modern Russia, from Revolution to Autocracy		Finalist	
2025	Yiyun Li	Things in Nature Merely Grow		Finalist	
2025	Claudia Rowe	Wards of the State: The Long Shadow of American Foster Care		Finalist	
2025	Jordan Thomas	When It All Burns: Fighting Fire in a Transformed World		Finalist	
2026	Abdelrahman ElGendy	Huna: A Memoir of Revolution, Prison, and Becoming		Winner	
2026	Camonghne Felix	Let the Poets Govern: A Declaration of Freedom		Finalist	
2026	Colin Asher	The Midnight Special: The Secret Prison History of American Music		Finalist	
2026	Sara Nović	Mother Tongue		Finalist	
2026	Joseph Osmundson	Spawning Season: An Experiment in Queer Parenthood		Finalist	

== Repeat winners ==
See also Winners of multiple U.S. National Book Awards

Three books have won two literary National Book Awards (that is, excluding graphics), all in nonfiction subcategories of 1964 to 1983.

- John Clive, Thomas Babington Macaulay: The Shaping of the Historian

1974 Biography; 1974 History

- Peter Matthiessen, The Snow Leopard

1979 Contemporary Thought; 1980 General Nonfiction, Paperback

- Lewis Thomas, The Lives of a Cell: Notes of a Biology Watcher

1975 Arts and Letters; 1975 Science

Matthiessen and Thomas won three Awards (as did Saul Bellow, all fiction). Matthiessen won the 2008 fiction award. Thomas is one of several authors of two Award-winning books in nonfiction categories.

- Justin Kaplan, 1961, 1981 (Arts and Letters, Biography/Autobiography)
- George F. Kennan, 1957, 1968 (Nonfiction, History and Biography)
- Anne Morrow Lindbergh, 1936, 1939 (Non-Fiction, Non-Fiction)
- David McCullough, 1978, 1982 (History, Autobiography/Biography)
- Arthur Schlesinger, 1966, 1979 (History and biography, Biography and Autobiography)
- Frances Steegmuller, 1971, 1981 (Arts and Letters, Translation)
- Lewis Thomas, 1975, 1981 (Arts and Letters and Science, Science)

== See also ==
- List of winners of the National Book Award, winners only.
