= William Abrahams Books =

William Abrahams Books was an imprint by editor William Abrahams at:

- Holt, Rinehart & Winston (1977–1984)
- E. P. Dutton (1984–1998)
