= Ralph L. Rusk =

American academic and writer

Ralph Leslie Rusk (July 11, 1888 — June 30, 1962) was an American academic and writer. Rusk began teaching at the University of the Philippines during the early 1910s before teaching English at Indiana University from 1915 to 1925. Upon entering Columbia University in 1925, Rusk continued to teach English and remained with the university until he retired in 1954.

Apart from academics, Rusk spent the majority of his writing career on works about Ralph Waldo Emerson. Rusk first published The Letters of Ralph Waldo Emerson in 1939 before releasing The Life of Ralph Waldo Emerson in 1949. The following year, The Life of Ralph Waldo Emerson received the 1950 National Book Award for Nonfiction. Rusk was also a recipient of the Guggenheim Fellowship in 1945.

== Early life and education ==
On July 11, 1888, Rusk was born in Rantoul, Illinois. For his post-secondary education, Rusk graduated from the University of Illinois in 1909 with a Bachelor of Arts. While attending Columbia University during the 1910s and 1920s, Rusk received both a Master of Arts and Doctor of Philosophy.

== Career ==
During the early 1910s, Rusk began his career as a high school teacher in between his studies at Illinois and Columbia. In academics, Rusk started at the University of the Philippines between 1912 and 1914 as an English teacher. From 1915 to 1925, Rusk continued to teach English at Indiana University and held various positions ranging from instructor to associate professor. In 1925, Rusk moved to Columbia University and resumed teaching English as an associate professor. After being promoted to professor in 1935, Rusk remained with Columbia until his 1954 retirement and was named a professor emeritus.

Apart from academics, Rusk released his first publications in the 1920s. He first wrote about Gilbert Imlay before publishing a work on Midwest American writings. Rusk also contributed to the Dictionary of American Biography from 1929 to 1935 with entries on Emerson Bennett, William Turner Coggeshall, Edward Eggleston and Imlay. For his biographical works, Rusk predominately focused his research on Ralph Waldo Emerson from 1929 to 1949. Rusk released a six-volume work titled The Letters of Ralph Waldo Emerson in 1939, which contained over four thousand letters from 1813 to 1881. In 1949, Rusk published a biography on Emerson titled The Life of Ralph Waldo Emerson.

== Awards and honors ==
In 1930, Rusk became a member of the American Antiquarian Society. For awards, Rusk received a Guggenheim Fellowship in 1945 and specialized in American literature. Years later, Rusk received the 1950 National Book Award for Nonfiction for The Life of Ralph Waldo Emerson.

== Personal life ==
On June 30, 1962, Rusk died from liver cancer in New York City. He was married and had one child.
