= Jack McLaughlin (writer) =

American historian and author

Jack McLaughlin (1926-2015) was an American author, biographer and college professor. He is best known for his 1988 biography of Thomas Jefferson entitled Jefferson and Monticello: The Biography of a Builder which was a finalist for the National Book Award for Nonfiction. The biography was assigned as required reading to train guides at Jefferson's estate at Monticello. Reviewing the book for The Journal of American History, Geoffrey Blodgett stated that the biography blended architecture with biography in a way that made it a spiritual successor to Fiske Kimball's 1916 book Thomas Jefferson: Architect. Blodgett further commended the book for documenting how Jefferson worked with different craftsmen and builders on his team (most of whom were slaves) to build and maintain Monticello, and how the estate changed through the years to reflect its architect's (Jefferson's) needs and desires.

McLaughlin's second book, To His Excellency Thomas Jefferson: Letters to a President was a collection of letters written by everday Americans to Jefferson. The Journal of American History stated that the collection of letters (including some of which Jefferson responded to with brief, courteous replys) do not actually reveal much about the life or thinking of Jefferson. The reviewer stated: "We learn almost nothing from Jefferson from the collection except perhaps more signs of the priggish and moralistic strains under his thin hide." However, the reviewer stated that the collection of letters was a valuable exploration and analysis of the concerns, ambitions and motivations of everyday Americans in the 1800s with a common theme amongst the letters regarding liberty and the pursuit of happiness. The Americans in the letters viewed any limits on their lives as injustices and a violations of their right to "life, liberty and the pursuit of happiness", which they expected the American president Jefferson to remediate.

McLaughlin was a professor of English at the University of Clemson from 1968 to 1991 when he retired. He was also head of the Humanities department at Clemson. He was born in Philadelphia, Pennsylvania and served in World War 2 in the Philippines Campaign where he was awarded a Bronze Star. His other writings have appeared in the academic journals Shakespeare Quarterly and Modern Drama.
