= John Unterecker =

American poet and writer

John Unterecker (1923–1989) was an American poet, literary scholar, and writer. He is known for his 1969 biography of poet Hart Crane which was a finalist for the 1970 National Book Award in the Arts and Letters category. Unterecker was also a poet, with his poems appearing in publications such as The New Yorker, The Nation, and Poetry magazine. A collection of his poems, entitled Stone: Poems, was published in 1977.

The 1970 biography on Crane was entitled Voyager: A Life of Hart Crane. Reviewing Voyager in The New York Times, Helen Vendler described two exemplary scholarly approaches used in the biography. She stated: "Unterecker has admirably resisted two "literary" temptations: to write a running commentary on the poems and to carry on a debate with unfriendly literary critics." Many critics had devalued Crane by describing his works as being overly sentimental or lacking political thought. However, Vendler commends Unterecker for not engaging with these critics, and allowing Crane's work to speak for itself. Vendler stated that by meticulously and thoroughly describing Crane's life, the reader was able to understand his struggles, his mood, and his relationship with loved ones at the time of writing his works, including his most famous poems "The Broken Tower" and "The Bridge". Vendler stated that there were "unobtrusive words here and there" to link certain aspects of Crane's poems to his letters, however for the most part, Unterecker allows the reader to read about Crane's life and his poems, and make their own conclusions and theories.

Unterecker wrote the 1959 book A Reader's Guide to WB Yeats, which was a critical analysis of the works of poet WB Yeats. Reviewing the book in The New York Times, Charles Poore stated, regarding the analysis of Yeats' metre, tonality, and the poems' political advocacy, including yearning for Irish independence: "All these are carefully considered in Mr. Unterecker's closely reasoned and sometimes awesomely erudite romps among the exegetes." Poore lamented that the book was limited by "copyright-hobbled scholarship" in which only a few select lines of Yeats' poetry were included in the chapters, detracting from one's understanding of the poems. Poore [and Unterecker] recommended reading A Reader's Guide alongside The Collected Poems of W.B. Yeats in which Yeats' poems can be appreciated in their full, uninterrupted, unabridged beauty.

Unterecker received a Master's of Arts degree in 1948 and a PhD in 1956, both from Columbia University. He taught at the College of the City of New York from 1946 to 1958, Columbia University from 1958 to 1974, and the University of Hawaii from 1969 until his death in 1989 due complications following heart surgery. He was chair of the English department at the University of Hawaii. His papers are housed at Columbia University.
