= Calvin Bedient =

American poet and literary scholar

- Education: Whitman College; University of Washington (PhD)
- Occupations: Poet, literary scholar

Calvin Bedient is an American poet and literary scholar. He was an English professor at the University of California, Los Angeles (UCLA). His 1974 book Eight Contemporary Poets, which studied eight English, Welsh, Scottish, and Irish poets, was a finalist for the National Book Award for Nonfiction.

Reviewing Eight Contemporary Poets in The New York Times, Helen Vendler stated that the book was among the first analysis of these eight poets by an American scholar. The eight poets reviewed in the book, each with a chapter devoted to the poet, were W.S. Graham, Stevie Smith, R.S. Thomas, Philip Larkin, Donald Davie, Ted Hughes, Charles Tomlinson, and Thomas Kinsella. Vendler stated that similar to the scholarship of Randall Jarrell, Bedient described the poets and their works using everyday language (colloquialism) which facilitated understanding between the reader with the poet and his work on a personal, human scale. Vendler stated: "Calvin Bedient writes about poems with an unfailing sense of the human being stationed in each one." Vendler stated the chapter on Kinsella was lacking in imagination which she believed was due to Kinsella's poetry being more predictable and less interesting than the other poets'. Eight Contemporary Poets posited a theme underlying contemporary British poetry, with the poetry being "deliberately deficient, moderate with a will", with the more minimalist approach being shaped by the generation of poets' hardship during World War II.

Bedient studied at the Whitman College Conservancy of Music and the University of Washington, where he earned his PhD. He wrote collections of poetry including The Multiple (2012), Days of Unwilling (2008), The Violence of the Morning (2002), and Candy Necklace (1997). He also wrote books on literary criticism including The Yeats Brothers and Modernism's Love of Mobility (2008), He Do the Police in Different Voices: "The Waste Land" and Its Protagonist (1986), In the Heart's Last Kingdom: Robert Penn Warren's Major Poetry (1984), and Architects of the Self: George Eliot, D.H. Lawrence, and E.M. Forster (1972). He was the founding editor of the New California Poetry series, a collection of 31 books of poetry published by the University of California Press. He co-edited the literary journal Lana Turner: A Journal of Poetry and Opinion.

Bedient's noted Walt Whitman and Gertrude Stein as his literary influences.
