= Howard M. Feinstein =

American psychiatrist and author

Howard Marvin Feinstein (born 1929) is an American psychiatrist and writer. His 1984 biography of the psychologist and philosopher William James was a finalist for the National Book Award.

Feinstein received his undergraduate degree from Cornell University and then earned a medical degree also from Cornell in 1955. He completed his psychiatry residency at NewYork-Presbyterian Westchester hospital and then served two years as a captain in the United States Army Medical Corps at Fort Sill in Oklahoma. He earned a PhD at Cornell University in 1977 with his thesis entitled Fathers and Sons: Work and the Inner World of William James, An Intergenerational Inquiry.

Fathers and Sons examined letters and diaries from three generations of the James family, spanning from the end of the American Revolution to World War I, in an exploration of how historical and cultural contexts shaped the James' psychological minds. Feinstein explains how he used this form of psychobiography to guide his own clinical practice as a psychologist. This thesis would be further developed by Feinstein to become his 1984 book Becoming William James, which was published by the Cornell University Press and Plunkett Lake Press. Writing for the New York Times, physician and bioethecist Willard Gaylin described the book as a success, and stated of Feinstein: "He has offered us a rich new vocabulary with which to describe William James." Gaylin was critical of Feinstein for only including James' earlier life, and failing to explain how the fledgling young man with little to no experience became one of the foremost thinkers of the 19th century and one of the most important figures in the field of modern psychology. Gaylin was also critical of the book for not exploring with any detail James' relationship with his mother Mary James, who was said to have a central role in his early life. Finally, Gaylin was critical for the inclusion of some family members' letters, particularly James' younger brothers Wilkie and Bob, feeling the inclusion of their chapter was superfluous and did not pertain at all with James' own psychology or character. Writing in The American Historical Review, historian Dorothy Ross stated that James' "complex personality has discouraged and eluded biographers" but Feinstein's work "has finally given us a life study equal in richness to James himself". Ross stated the book provides a rich analysis and description of life in Victorian era America. Ross also stated that Feinstein succeeds in explaining how the environment and other family members shaped James' own personality and life, however she was also critical of the work for not expounded more on James' mother Mary and their relationship.

Feinstein was a professor of psychology at Cornell University. He studied psychobiography under Erik Erikson and was a visiting fellow at the Tavistock Clinic.
