= John Leonard Clive =

Historian

- Born: Hans Leo Kleyff; September 25, 1924; Berlin, Germany
- Died: January 7, 1990 (aged 65); Cambridge, Massachusetts, U.S.
- Education: University of North Carolina (BA); Harvard University (PhD)
- Awards: National Book Award for Biography (1974)
- Scientific career
- Fields: Historian
- Workplaces: University of Chicago; Harvard University

John Leonard Clive (born Hans Leo Kleyff; September 25, 1924 – January 7, 1990) was an American historian. He was a professor at Harvard University and the University of Chicago. He is most well known for his biography of Thomas Babington Macaulay: The Shaping of the Historian, for which he won the National Book Award for Biography and History.

== Biography ==
Born Hans Leo Kleyff (later anglicized to John Leonard Clive) in Berlin to German-Jewish parents, he attended the Französisches Gymnasium Berlin, before moving to England in 1937 where he went to Buxton College. In 1940 he emigrated with his family to the United States, where he attended the University of North Carolina. After his graduation he entered the army and joined the OSS.

In 1952 Clive received his Ph.D. from Harvard University and began teaching there. He received a Guggenheim Fellowship in 1957. That year he published Scotch Reviewers: The Edinburgh Review, 1802–1815. in 1960 Clive moved to the University of Chicago, where he was an assistant and associate professor until returning to Harvard in 1965. He would remain at Harvard for the rest of his career ultimately becoming the William R. Kenan Jr. Professor of History and Literature in 1979.

Clive won the National Book Award for Biography and History in 1974 for Thomas Babington Macaulay: The Shaping of the Historian, and was elected a Fellow of the American Academy of Arts and Sciences as well. Clive retired in 1989 and gave his last lecture that December. He died of a heart attack on January 7, 1990, in Cambridge, Massachusetts. He was posthumously awarded the National Book Critics Circle Award for Criticism for his final book, Not by Fact Alone: Essays on the Writing and Reading of History.
