= Jordan Thomas (American anthropologist) =

American anthropologist

Jordan Thomas is an American anthropologist and author. His 2025 book When It All Burns: Fighting Fire in a Transformed World is a finalist for the 2025 National Book Award for Nonfiction.

Thomas joined the Los Padres Hotshot crew (Hotshots being elite forest fire fighting teams in the US Forest Service) in 2021 and fought wildfires in Arizona, California and Nevada documenting the teams' experiences in the book. When It All Burns also details the history of forest fires in the United States and other parts of the world. Thomas explains how cultural burning, using controlled, man-made fires to manage forests but also for spiritual purposes, by indigenous peoples was shunned and even harshly punished by the European colonizers in North America. The Europeans saw these indigenous controlled burns as a threat to their newly installed agricultural practices. Thomas argues that the eradication of these cultural burning practices in the 18th and 19th centuries led to worsening wildfires. Thomas further explains how corporate greed, global warming, and further environmental mismanagement led to the megafires of the present day.

Reviewing the book for The New York Times, Robert Sullivan said some passages pertaining to the present day firefighting team felt like a "testosterone soaked reality show", however Sullivan favorably reviewed the book's meticulous description of fire policies around the world, and how those policies suppressed the practices of indigenous peoples. The Los Angeles Times stated that Thomas shifted between his firsthand experiences as a firefighter to a thorough explanation of indigenous cultural practices, forest ecology, science, and economics as it relates to forest fires. The Los Angeles Times stated: "In Thomas’ hands these subjects are interconnected, and his writing brings new heat to an ubiquitous subject."

Thomas has Master's degrees from Durham University and the University of Cambridge. He is a graduate student in anthropology at the University of California Santa Barbara. His other writings have appeared in The Los Angeles Times, The San Francisco Chronicle, The Seattle Times, and The Drift.
