= Robert Shaplen =

American writer and journalist

Robert Shaplen (1917 - 1988) was an American journalist, war correspondent, and writer. He was one of the world's foremost experts on Southeast Asia during his journalistic career which spanned five decades. His book about the United States' foreign policy in Vietnam, The Lost Revolution: The US in Vietnam, 1946-1966, was a finalist for the National Book Award.

Shaplen began his career as a reporter for the New York Herald Tribune newspaper, where he worked from 1937 to 1943. He then reported for Newsweek magazine as a war correspondent during World War II where he covered the Pacific War. He was embedded with the United States Marine Corps where he reported from the front lines, including during the amphibious landings at Leyte in the Philippines. After the war he served as the Far East beareau chief for Newsweek before reporting on the Far East for Fortune and Collier's magazines. In 1952 he began writing for the New Yorker covering Southeast Asia as a freelance reporter-at-large. He then became a staff writer for the New Yorker from 1962 to 1978. His reporting covered many momentous events in Southeast Asia during the 20th century. Shaplen flew over the Japanese city of Nagasaki hours after an atom bomb destroyed much of the city. He travelled with Mao Zedong in 1946 during the Chinese Civil War, he profiled Indonesian president Sukarno, and he reported directly on the Vietnam War, including the Fall of Saigon in 1975. He was a Nieman Fellow at Harvard University from 1947 to 1948.

His 1965 book, The Lost Revolution: The US in Vietnam, 1946-1966 was highly critical of US foreign policy during the Vietnam War. Shaplen explains that numerous US blunders and mismanagement led to a weak nationalist government in South Vietnam that was ill prepared to withstand the communist insurgency. Reviewing the book for The New York Times in October 1965 (six months after the United States had greatly expanded the conflict by sending combat troops to South Vietnam and launching a bombing campaign of North Vietnam), Homer Bigart stated: "'The Lost Revolution' is required reading for all who are interested in avoiding similar blunders the next time we intervene in a revolutionary struggle."

In addition to his reportage, he had written a collection of short stories set in Southeast Asia entitled A Corner of the World (1949) and the novel A Forest of Tigers (1956).

He wrote 10 books throghout his career. The Shaplen Papers; his writings, research materials, correspondence, and drafts, are housed at the Wisconsin Historical Society on the campus of the University of Wisconsin Madison.

Shaplen was married three times, from 1953 to 1962 to Martha Luca, from 1962 to 1982 to June Herman, and from 1984 to 1988 to Jayjia Hsia. He had three children.. He received a bachelors degree in journalism from the University of Wisconsin and a master's from Columbia University.

In the autumn of 1987, Shaplen sailed the Yangtze River with his wife Hsia (who had returned to her homeland at the city of Wuhan for the first time since leaving China in 1938, aged 8). Shaplen documented their voyage on the river and also reported on the planned construction of a dam at the Three Gorges which would reshape the river, the valley, and all of China. Living with thyroid cancer, Shapley had returned to the United States in 1988 and died shortly thereafter. His final piece entitled The Long River, documenting he and his wife's voyage on the Yangtzee River, was posthumously published in the New Yorker in 1988.

== Bibliography ==
Non Fiction

- Free Love: The Story of a Great American Scandal (1954)
- Kreuger: Genius And Swindler (1960) (biography)
- The Lost Revolution: The U.S. In Vietnam, 1946-1966 (1966)
- Time out of Hand: Revolution and Reaction in Southeast Asia (1969)
- The Road From War: Vietnam 1965-1970 (1970)
- A Turning Wheel: Thirty Years Of The Asian Revolution By A Correspondent For The New Yorker (1979)
- Bitter Victory (1986)
- The Unfinished Revolution: The Philippines from Marcos to Aquino (1987)

Novels

- A Forest of Tigers (1956)

Short Story Collections

- A Corner of the World (1949) (aka The Love-Making of Max-Robert)
