= Nuel Pharr Davis =

American author

Nuel Pharr Davis (circa 1916-2001) was an American professor of English at the University of Illinois who was most well known for his 1968 biography of nuclear physicists J. Robert Oppenheimer and Ernest Lawrence. The biography, Lawrence and Oppenheimer, was a finalist for the National Book Award. The biography took Davis about seven years to research and he interviewed more than 100 colleagues of Lawrence and Oppenheimer to develop the work. He also wrote a biography of Victorian author Wilkie Collins in 1956.

== Career ==
=== The Life of Wilkie Collins ===
Davis authored a 1956 biography of Victorian writer Wilkie Collins, who is best known for his novels The Woman in White and The Moonstone. A reviewer in Time magazine stated the biography was "intellectually skimpy, but as a personal history of Collins it is thorough, which may be just as well: Collins’ life was no less intriguing than his books." The Woman in White, a revolutionary thriller novel, was wildly popular at the time of publication in the 1850s and 60s and was serialized in Charles Dickens's magazine All the Year Round and Harper's Magazine in the United States.

=== Lawrence and Oppenheimer ===
Lawrence and Oppenheimer details the once friendly and collaborative relationship between J. Robert Oppenheimer and Ernest Lawrence that turned acrimonious in the 1950s. Lawrence and Oppenheimer were colleagues in the theoretical physics department at the University of California, Berkeley and made some of the most important contributions to the field of nuclear physics. The relationship continued into the 1940s when Oppenheimer was chosen as the scientific lead of the Manhattan Project, the clandestine program during World War II to build the world's first atomic bomb. At the time, Lawrence was one of the world's foremost experts in nuclear physics, and had developed the cyclotron, the world's first particle accelerator. After the war, the relationship between Oppenheimer and Lawrence grew more bitter and the collaborative partnership ended. Lawrence continued his studies in physics at Berkeley while Oppenheimer returned to his Institute for Advanced Study in Princeton, New Jersey while becoming an advisor to the Atomic Energy Commission. After the war, with Harry Truman becoming President of the United States, Oppenheimer had fallen out of favor with the government establishment. Oppenheimer's previous communist associations (his family and friends), his more left wing liberal beliefs, and his opposition to the development of the hydrogen bomb (for fear of fueling a nuclear arms race with the Soviet Union) culminated in the 1954 Oppenheimer security clearance hearing in which Oppenheimer was stripped of his security clearance. Ernst G. Straus, at the time the chairman of the Atomic Energy Commission and the president of the board of Oppenheimer's own Institute for Advanced Study, was often seen as the driving force behind the 1954 hearings. Edward Teller, one of the chief scientists on the hydrogen bomb project, testified in favor of revoking Oppenheimer's security clearance. By 1954 Lawrence and Oppenheimer disagreed on many matters, professionally and personally, however, due to being in poor health, Lawrence did not attend the 1954 hearings.

Writing for The New Yorker, in a mixed review in 1969, former Oppenheimer student at the Institute in Princeton and theoretical physicist Jeremy Bernstein stated that the biography had a "splendid journalistic elan and high sense of drama". However, Bernstein was highly critical of the historical scholarship of the book. Bernstein criticized Davis for using quotations without ascribing sources to them, having factual inaccuracies with regards to names, dates, or events, and being too speculative with regards to certain aspects of the narrative (such as a depicted early love affair between Oppenheimer and a woman in Corsica)(Oppenheimer himself was not interviewed for the book). Another encounter in which Lawrence was particularly harsh to his student Robert R. Wilson, cutting his pay and not allowing him to go home to his mother after a long day in the lab, never occurred according to Bernstein's own interview with Wilson. After the war, Lawrence developed The Bevatron, the largest and most advanced particle accelerator in the world, which greatly advanced the field of particle physics. Bernstein was critical of Davis for not focusing on this, nor on Lawrence's latter career. In conclusion, Bernstein stated: "The book's polemic strength is diluted by its factual unreliability."

A review in Time magazine commended Davis for his portrayal of the physicists not only as scientists but also as human beings (documenting their intimate personal lives). Time also enjoyed the inclusion of lesser known physicists in the narrative such as Louis Slotin, Seth Neddermeyer, M. Stanley Livingston, and Edward Teller. However, Time stated that the biography's narrative of Oppenheimer and Lawrence as professional and personal rivals was not convincing, with the reviewers feeling that Oppenheimer's life dominated the biography.
