= Peter Svenson =

American author

Peter Svenson is an American author who is known for his 1992 book Battlefield: Farming a Civil War Battleground which was a finalist for the National Book Award for Nonfiction. In Battlefield, Svenson documents his purchase of 40 acres of farmland in the Shenandoah Valley of Virginia in the community of Cross Keys in 1985 as he and his wife hoped to start their lives anew. Unbeknownst to them, the land had been the site of the 1862 Battle of Cross Keys in the American Civil War in which Confederate forces led by brigadier general Isaac Trimble decisively repulsed an advance by Union forces led by major general John C. Fremont. The victory at Cross Keys, followed the next day by victory at the Battle of Port Republic, completed general Stonewall Jackson's successful Shenandoah Valley Campaign.

Battlefield describes how Svenson and his wife assiduously farmed the land despite having no prior farming experience (Svenson was an abstract painter and his wife an art professor) and with no additional farmworkers. Svenson eventually learns that their farmland had been the site of a battle when he discovers artillery fragments and shell casings while working on the land and speaking to neighboring farmers. He describes their struggle to remediate the over-grazed, neglected land into a functional hay and alfalfa farm while also respecting the hallowed land and preserving its topography. Svenson alternates chapters between describing the Battle of Cross Keys and his modern day work on the farm. Svenson describes the struggles of a modern-day small farmer; fending off land prospectors, real-estate speculators, rebuilding a barn and constructing a house on the land, and, specific to his farm, fending off battlefield plunderers. Svenson researched the battle by reviewing the archives at the Virginia Historical Society in Richmond, this included firsthand accounts of the battle from a Confederate soldier's diary.

Writing in The New York Times Herbert Mitgang described Battlefield as a skillfully paired exploration of the battle and modern day farming. Mitgang stated: "Its quite a literary accomplishment to mortise these two stories together, but Mr. Svenson succeeds in doing so smoothly". Mitgang was also intrigued by the inclusion of direct correspondences between Abraham Lincoln and Union major general Fremont, who was outmatched in the battle despite having superior numbers. In a briefly noted review in The New Yorker, the reviewer stated that the modern day depictions of farming, and toiling on the land, made the tragedy of the lives lost and damaged on the same land in 1862 more salient.

Svenson's second book, 1994's Preservation, was a memoir, combining recollections of his childhood growing up in an eclectic variety of settings in the United States (including the Atlantic coast of Rhode Island and Manhattan) with his modern day farming life in Cross Keys. Writing in The New York Times, Howard Frank Mosher stated that Preservation "fairly rings with the Emersonian virtues of self-reliance, confidence and versatility". Mosher appreciated Svenson's idealism as he began his new life as a farmer (despite not having any farming experience), while resisting modern-day pressures towards conformity.
