= Andy Logan (journalist) =

American journalist

Andy Logan (Born Isabel Ann Logan)(6 February 1920 – 21 November 2000) was an American journalist. She was best known for being a writer for The New Yorker from 1942 until her death in 2000. She was a City Hall political reporter and contributed to the "Talk of the Town" section for the magazine. Her 1970 book Against the Evidence which reported on the 1912 murder of Herman Rosenthal was a finalist for the National Book Award the following year.

== Early life ==
Logan was born in Cleveland, Ohio on February 6, 1920, and grew up in Ohio and Candler, North Carolina. Detesting her nickname "Izzy", during college at Swarthmore College she changed her name to Andy. She admired writer E.B. White who went by the nickname "Andy". She joined the staff at The New Yorker upong graduating from Swarthmore in 1942.

== Career ==
Logan was a staff writer at the New Yorker from 1942 until her death in 2000. She was the first female reporter to write for the magazine's "Talk of the Town" section (covering local New York City culture) and also wrote for the City Hall column (which covered local New York City politics). She wrote for the City Hall column from 1969 to 1994, but she covered local politics for the magazine before and after those dates as well. She reported on the tenure of five New York City mayors from John V. Lindsay to Rudolph Giuliani. As a political reporter she was known for her meticulous record keeping (both her primary records and articles from the press) and emphasis on accuracy in reporting, as she kept a trove of information about politics. She was also known for her uncompromizing, often negative portrayal of New York City political figures, with using a searing (and many times comedic) wit in her reportage. She would often use direct quotations from politicians to draw attention to their misgivings or shortcomings. New York City mayor Ed Koch, angered by her reporting, reportedly disinvited Logan from a Christmas party for the press corps at the Mayor's mansion. Koch stated of Logan: "She believed in flaying, and most people don't like to be skinnned." However, Koch also stated: "She was a repository of City Hall history, she had covered so many mayors and kept minute records of everything they said." She was a mentor to many younger political writers, seeing herself as a motherly figure, often bringing cookies to the press-corps room in city hall.

As a "Talk of the Town" reporter for the New Yorker she was also known for mentoring younger writers. At the time, The New Yorker did not publish bylines listing authors' names for articles appearing in the "Talk of the Town" section, but Logan was known for reviewing the drafts and posting the authors' names on a board in the newsroom to keep morale high. As a writer for the magazine, she wrote over 260 articles, three short stories, and four poems. In the 1940s, she reported from the Nuremberg trials, the prosecution of Nazi war criminals after World War II.

New Yorker editor David Remnick said of Logan: "She wrote about the city and City Hall as if it were a passing parade, with a great sense of irony and wit". Remnick compared her writing to that of Murray Kempton and stated Logan was a treasure of New York.

Logan wrote two books, The Man Who Robbed the Robber Barrons in 1965 and Against the Evidence in 1970. The Robber Barrons was a biography of colonel William d'Alton Mann. Mann was a civil war Union cavalry officer who moved to New York City to become a newspaper and magazine publisher. He was known to take money from powerful businessmen (Robber Barrons) in exchange for not publishing negative stories about them in his paper Town Topics. Mann sued Robert J. Collier of Collier's weekly for libel for a negative portrayal of himself. During the trial, Mann's blackmailing scheme was exposed. Writing for the New York Times, Peter Lyon stated the book focused on this famous trial. But Lyon commended Logan for extensively researching Mann's less-known earlier life and reporting on these parts. This included Mann's heroism at the Battle of Gettysburg with the 7th Michigan Cavalry Regiment, publishing an influential Southern newspaper, authoring a book on military tactics, and various business interests.

Logan's 1970 book, Against the Evidence, reported on the 1912 murder of gambling house proprietor Herman Rosenthal. Logan argued that New York Police Department lieutenant Charles Becker was framed for the murders by district attorney Charles S. Whitman. Logan argued that Whitman, who had aspirations for the governorship of New York and the presidency, recruited low-level criminals to testify against Becker. The conviction was sought by Whitman as a cause célèbre, with the goal of winning public support and fomenting a reputation as an anti-corruption champion. Writing for The New York Times, W.H. Swanberg stated: "With few exceptions Miss Logan keeps her bulky story and cast under admirable control." Swanberg also commended Logan for her sympathetic portrayal of Becker, who he stated was tragically portrayed as an innocent victim of another man's ambitions (Becker was later executed for the murder, along with the four gunmen he allegedly hired).

== Personal life ==
Logan was married to Charles Lyon who was the deputy chief counsel at the Nuremberg Trials and a deputy United States Attorney General. They were married in 1943 and had seven children.
