= Cary Reich =

American Writer

Cary Reich (1949-1998) was an American journalist and author who is known for his 1996 biography of Nelson Rockefeller The Life of Nelson A. Rockefeller: Worlds to Conquer, 1908-1958 which was a finalist for the National Book Award for Nonfiction. Reich was working on a second book in the series, detailing Rockefeller's later life, when he died unexpectedly of pancreatic cancer in 1998. Writing for The New York Times, historian Geoffrey Ward stated that the biography is "as rich and nuanced as we will ever have" on the subject.

Reich also wrote the 1983 biography Financier: The Biography of Andre Meyer about the controversial financier and investment banker Andre Meyer.

Reich was also a financial journalist, writing for the magazine Institutional Investor, where he was known for his profiles of prominent people in the financial industry. He created an international version of Institutional Investor and was awarded an Overseas Press Club Award. He was also a contributor to The New York Times. He had worked for The Commercial and Financial Chronicle for a short time before joining Institutional Investor.

Reich graduated from Brooklyn College and the Medill School of Journalism at Northwestern University.
