= Richard J. Whalen =

American author and political consultant

Richard J. Whalen (23 September 1935 - 18 July 2023) was an American author, biographer, newspaper and magazine journalist, and political consultant. His 1964 biography of Joseph P. Kennedy Sr., the patriarch of the Kennedy Family, was a finalist for the National Book Award. He was also a political advisor to future president of the United States Richard Nixon during his 1968 campaign for the presidency.

== Biography ==
Whalen graduated from Queens College in New York City in 1957 with degrees in political science and English. He then became a print journalist, writing for The Richmond News Leader newspaper in Virginia. At the Richmond News, he was a reporter and wrote editorials from a socially conservative perspective. He was also a columnist for the Wall Street Journal. In 1960, he briefly wrote for Time magazine as a National Affairs correspondent before moving onto Fortune magazine later that year.

At Fortune, Whalen wrote a feature-length profile of Joseph P. Kennedy Sr., the patriarch of the Kennedy family; one of the most prominent families in 20th century American politics. This profile was followed in 1964 by a full-length book biography of Joseph Kennedy entitled The Founding Father: The Story of Joseph P. Kennedy. Prior to writing the biography, Whalen had received a 100,000 cash advance from the New American Library (about 1 million dollars in 2023). The biography was commercially successful, spending 28 weeks on the New York Times Best Seller list, and was also a finalist for the National Book Award. The book was notable as it was the first biography of Joseph Kennedy, predating other biographies by decades, as well as being written without any assistance or cooperation from the Kennedy Family. Writing for The New York Times, Frank Freidel stated that the biography is open to interpretation with regards to Kennedy's moral character, letting the reader decide what type of man he was. In a mixed review in Commentary magazine, the reporter criticized the biography for relying too heavily on Whalen's own opinions while also over-relying on "gossip" rather than verifiable information. However, the reviewer also noted that the book contained a more nuanced and sympathetic profile of the Kennedy sons, especially John F. Kennedy. In the public eye in the 1960s, Kennedy was vaunted as a political star who had never known defeat. However, the biography showed that Kennedy had grown up in the shadow of his older brother Joseph P. Kennedy Jr., and that he had endured many challenges growing up and in his political career.

After the biography, in 1965, Whalen left Fortune and became a writer and researcher for The Center for Strategic and International Studies, then attached to Georgetown University. His time at the center drew the attention of presidential candidate Richard Nixon, who in 1968 recruited Whalen to join his presidential campaign as a speechwriter and consultant. Later in the same year, dissillusioned with what he believed were Nixon's empty promises to end the Vietnam War, Whalen resigned from the Nixon presidential campaign. In May 1972 Whalen wrote a book highly critical of Nixon entitled Catch the Falling Flag: A Republican's Challenge to His Party. The book criticized Nixon for betraying his Republican ideals and failing to deliver on his political promises. The book was published only months before The Watergate scandal, which effectively ended Nixon's presidency and political career.

Whalen was a political consultant and speechwriter for William P. Rogers the Secretary of State for Richard Nixon, from 1969 to 1970. He was also a political consultant to Ronald Reagan both before and during his presidency.
