= Alan Burdick =

American writer

Alan Burdick is an American writer who is currently a staff writer and editor at the Health and Science desk at The New York Times. He primarily covers health and science topics. He has previously contributed to The New Yorker where he was also an editor of the magazine's Elements science and technology blog. He was also a senior editor for Discover and has also written for GQ and Harper's.

His debut 2005 book Out of Eden: An Odyssey of Ecological Invasion (which details various invasive species and their environmental effects as well as the efforts of scientists including ornithologists, entomologists and others to remediate those effects) was a finalist for the 2005 National Book Award for Nonfiction. Reviewing the book for The New York Times, Richard Conniff criticized Burdick for minimizing the detrimental effects of invasive species on a region's ecosystem stating: "The argument that many, or even most, invasive species cause no harm risks encouraging a 'What, me worry?' attitude in a public already too complacent about environmental change." Writing for Salon, Andrew O'Hehir stated that Burdick's depiction of the "burgeoning discipline of invasion ecology is nuanced, judicious and often delightful; in the finest tradition of science writing, Burdick delivers the hard stuff on a granular level while also pursuing a more philosophical and personal muse."

His 2017 book Why Time Flies: A Mostly Scientific Investigation discusses the science and philosophy of time. Theoretical physicist Carlo Rovelli stated that after reading the book one will "be closer to what is today's state of scientific knowledge about the nature of time: an enchanting enigma."
