= John Phillip Santos =

American freelance filmmaker, producer, journalist, and author

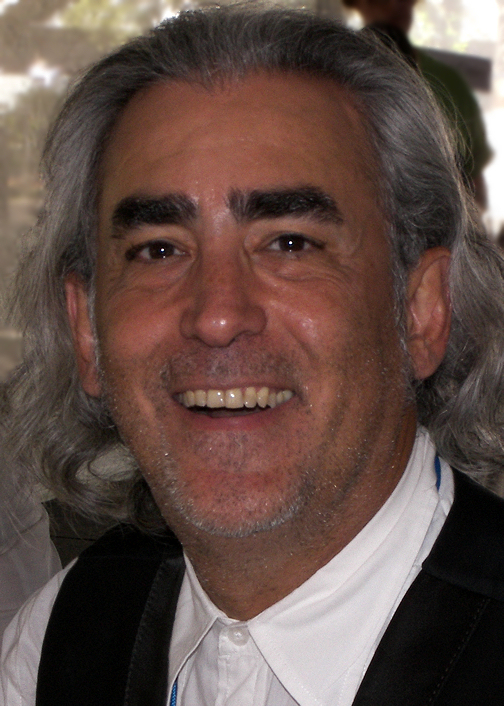
John Phillip Santos at the 2010 Texas Book Festival.

John Phillip Santos (born 1957) is an American freelance filmmaker, producer, journalist, and author. In 1979, he became the first Mexican-American Rhodes Scholar.

== Early life ==
Santos was born and raised in San Antonio, Texas. In 1997, Santos joined the Ford Foundation as an officer in the Media, Arts and Culture Program.

He lived in New York City for twenty years, returning to San Antonio in May 2005.

== Career ==
His articles have appeared in the Los Angeles Times, San Antonio Express-News, and the New York Times. As an executive producer, he has over forty broadcast documentaries on culture, religion, politics and spirituality for CBS News and PBS, some of which have been nominated for Emmys. As a director he has been involved in program development for Thirteen/WNET in New York City.

Santos was an Emmy nominee in 1988 for From the AIDS Experience: Part I, Our Spirits to Heal/ Part II, Our Humanity to Heal, and in 1985 for Exiles Who Never Leave Home. He has an MA English Literature and Language from St. Catherine's College at Oxford University and a BA in Philosophy and Literature from the University of Notre Dame.

Between August 7 and August 18, 2006, Texas Public Radio (KSTX 89.1 FM) broadcast Santos reading from his family memoir Places Left Unfinished at the Time of Creation.

== Awards ==
He has been awarded the Academy of American Poets' Prize at Notre Dame, the Oxford Prize for fiction, and the Berlin Prize Fellow at the American Academy in Berlin. His family memoir, Places Left Unfinished at the Time of Creation was a finalist for the National Book Award. He was also a past member of the President's Advisory Commission on Educational Excellence for Hispanic Americans.

== Bibliography ==
- The Farthest Home is in an Empire of Fire
- Places Left Unfinished at the Time of Creation
- Songs Older Than Any Known Singer: Selected and New Poems, 1974–2006, with Arturo Madrid
