= Frank E. Manuel =

American historian (1910–2003)

Frank Edward Manuel (September 12, 1910 – April 23, 2003) was an American historian, Kenan Professor of History, emeritus, at New York University and Alfred and Viola Hart University Professor, emeritus, at Brandeis University. He was known for his work on the idea of utopia. In 1980, he and his wife, Fritzie P. Manuel, won the Ralph Waldo Emerson Award for their book Utopian Thought in the Western World (1979). In 1983, they won the National Book Award for the paperback edition of the same work.

== Early life and family ==
Manuel was born in Boston on September 12, 1910. He attended Harvard University, earning his A.B. in 1930, his M.A. in 1931, and his Ph.D. in 1933. He married Fritzie Prigohzy on October 6, 1936.

== Career ==
Manuel taught at Harvard from 1935 to 1937, after which he had a number of short-term jobs and began to teach at Brandeis University, where he stayed until 1965, when he joined New York University. He returned to Brandeis in 1977. He was Kenan Professor of History, emeritus, at New York University and Alfred and Viola Hart University Professor, emeritus, at Brandeis University.

Manuel was known for his work on the history of the idea of Utopias. In 1980, he and Fritzie won the Ralph Waldo Emerson Award for their book Utopian Thought in the Western World (1979), which the Times Higher Education Supplement described as "the starting point for all Utopian scholarship". In 1983 they won the National Book Award for the paperback edition of the same work.

He died in Boston.

== Selected publications ==
- The Age of Reason. 1951.
- The New World of Saint-Simon.1956.
- The Eighteenth Century Confronts the Gods. 1959.
- The Prophets of Paris. 1962.
- Isaac Newton: Historian. Harvard University Press, 1963.
- Shapes of Philosophical History. 1965.
- A Portrait of Isaac Newton. Harvard University Press, 1968.
- The Religion of Isaac Newton. Clarendon Press, 1977
- Utopian Thought in the Western World, with Fritzie P. Manuel. Basil Blackwell, Oxford, 1979. ISBN 063112361X.
- The Changing of the Gods. 1983.
- The Broken Staff: Judaism Through Christian Eyes. 1992.
- A Requiem for Karl Marx. Harvard University Press, 1995.
- James Bowdoin and the Patriot Philosophers, with Fritzie P. Manuel. 2004.
