= The Revolutionary Left in Spain, 1914–1923 =

1974 book by Gerald Meaker

- Author: Gerald H. Meaker
- Subject: History of Spain
- Publisher: Stanford University Press
- Publication date: 1974

The Revolutionary Left in Spain, 1914–1923, is a 1974 history of Spanish labor and the left written by Gerald H. Meaker.
