= Howard Gruber =

American psychologist (1922–2005)

Howard Ernest Gruber (November 6, 1922 – January 25, 2005), was an American psychologist and pioneer of the psychological study of creativity. A native of Brooklyn, Gruber graduated from Brooklyn College with a degree in psychology, earned his Ph.D. from Cornell University, and went on to a distinguished academic career. He worked with Jean Piaget in Geneva and later co-founded the Institute for Cognitive Studies at Rutgers with Dorothy Dinnerstein. At Columbia University Teachers College, he continued to pursue his interests in the history of science, and particularly the work of Charles Darwin. Gruber's work led to several important discoveries about the creative process and the developmental psychology of creativity.

His work on Charles Darwin entitled Darwin on Man: A Psychological Study of Scientific Creativity, became the groundwork of his methodological approach for the case study of evolving systems. This book was awarded Science Book of the Year for 1974 by Phi Beta Kappa.

Key aspects of this approach are a radical focus on individuals as situated in a network of enterprise. The method uses a strong existential perspective as regards the "creative" individual who is said to act at all times with knowledge, purpose and affect. Creativity is purposeful work.

Gruber was a supporter but not a member of the Fair Play for Cuba Committee, signing an open letter promoting the organization.

== Bibliography ==
1. The Howard Gruber World Wide Web Site - http://davidlavery.net/Gruber/
2. Wallace, Doris and Howard E. Gruber, eds. (1989). Creative People at Work: Twelve Cognitive Case Studies. New York: Oxford University Press.
3. NY Times Obituary - https://web.archive.org/web/20070221055145/http://condor.admin.ccny.cuny.edu/~hhartman/howie%20gruber%20obit.doc
4. http://www.britannica.com/eb/topic-247330/Howard-E-Gruber
5. Darwin on Man: A Psychological Study of Scientific Creativity. 2nd. ed. Chicago: University of Chicago Press, 1980.
6. DOI.org
7. Gugghenheim Fellowship winner - List of Guggenheim Fellowships awarded in 1974
