= William Abrahams =

American author and editor

William Abrahams (1919 - 1998) was an American poet, author, and editor. His literary career spanned a wide array of disciplines including poetry, novels, biographies, non-fiction books, and editing short stories and novels. He presided over the O Henry Awards for best short stories from 1965 to 1996; awarding the best short story in the nation as well as editing and curating the yearly anthology of O Henry nominated short stories. In his role with the awards, Robert McG. Thomas Jr. lauded Abrahams as "almost single-handidly preserving the short story as a viable genre."

Abrahams began his career writing poetry. He wrote four novels including Interval in Carolina (1945), By the Beautiful Sea (1947), and Imperial Waltz (1954). Interval in Carolina tells the story of an American soldier stationed at the homefront during World War 2 who finds love. The premise of the novel may have been from Abrahams' own experiences as a soldier during World War 2 serving as military police in Miami, Florida.

He served as an editor of books starting in 1963. He was an editor for the Atlantic Monthly Press. He also had his own imprint (William Abrahams Books) for Dutton and Holt, Rinehart & Winston. Throghout his career, Abrahams edited over 350 books, including novels by authors Joyce Carol Oates, John Fowles, John Knowles, Shirley Hazzard and Pauline Kael. In 1968, he moved to Northern California to become the West-Coast editor for the Atlantic Monthly Press. In 1968, he began a creative partnership with historian Peter Stansky and the collaboration produced 4 non-fiction books. This included Journey to the Frontier: Two Roads to the Spanish Civil War (1966) which was a finalist for the National Book Award. Stansky and Abrahams also authored a two volume biography of George Orwell, The Unknown Orwell (1972) and Orwell: The Transformation (1980), with both books being finalists for the National Book Award in the biography category. The fourth book, London's Burning: Life, Death and Art in the Second World War (1994), documented different artists in wartime Britain and explained how the war shaped their works. Artists featured in the book were: Paul Nash, Graham Sutherland, Henry Moore, Humphrey Jennings, and Benjamin Britten.

Abrahams grew up in Boston, Massachusetts graduated from Harvard University. He also studied writing at Stanford University.
