= Ordeal of the Union =

History book series by Allan Nevins

- Title page of the second volume
- Author: Allan Nevins
- Language: English
- Publisher: Charles Scribner's Sons
- Published: 1947-1971
- No. of books: 8

Ordeal of the Union is an eight-volume series of books (published 1947–1971) on mid-19th century American history, and particularly on the American Civil War and its background, written by historian Allan Nevins. Two further volumes, intended to cover the Reconstruction era were planned, but not written as a result of Nevins's 1971 death. The first two books in the series have the collective title Ordeal of the Union (with differing subtitles), the third and fourth the collective title The Emergence of Lincoln, and the fifth through the eighth the collective title The War for the Union; the series is, however, generally referred to as Ordeal of the Union as a whole, and the individual volumes have also been republished under this umbrella title.

The individual books are:

1. Ordeal of the Union: Fruits of Manifest Destiny, 1847–1852 (1947)
2. Ordeal of the Union: A House Dividing, 1852–1857 (1947)
3. The Emergence of Lincoln: Douglas, Buchanan, and Party Chaos, 1857–1859 (1950)
4. The Emergence of Lincoln: Prologue to Civil War, 1859–1861 (1950)
5. The War for the Union: The Improvised War, 1861–1862 (1959)
6. The War for the Union: War Becomes Revolution, 1862–1863 (1960)
7. The War for the Union: The Organized War, 1863–1864 (1971)
8. The War for the Union: The Organized War to Victory, 1864–1865 (1971)

For the last two volumes, published in 1971, Nevins won the U.S. National Book Award in History.
