= Los Angeles Times Book Prize for Current Interest =

Annual literary prize

The Los Angeles Times Book Prize for Current Interest, established in 1980, is a category of the Los Angeles Times Book Prize. Works are eligible during the year of their first US publication in English, though they may be written originally in languages other than English.

== Recipients ==
Los Angeles Times Book Prize for Current Interest winners and finalists
Year	Author	Title	Result	Ref.
1980	Harrison Salisbury	Without Fear or Favor	Winner	
1981	Jacobo Timerman	Prisoner without a Name, Cell without a Number	Winner	
1982	Jonathan Schell	The Fate of the Earth	Winner	
1983	Walker Percy	Lost in the Cosmos	Winner	
1984	Jane Jacobs	Cities and the Wealth of Nations	Winner	
1985	Robert N. Bellah, Richard Madsen, William M. Sullivan, Ann Swidler, and Steven M. Tipton	Habits of the Heart: Individualism and Commitment in American Life	Winner	
1986	Joseph Lelyveld	Move Your Shadow: South Africa, Black and White	Winner	
1987	Richard Dawkins	The Blind Watchmaker	Winner	
1988	William Greider	Secrets of the Temple: How the Federal Reserve Runs the Country	Winner	
1989	Taylor Branch	Parting the Waters: America in the King Years, 1954-1963	Winner	
1990	O. B. Hardison, Jr.	Disappearing through the Skylight: Culture and Technology in the Twentieth Century	Winner	
1990	Václav Havel and Paul Wilson	Disturbing the Peace: A Conversation with Karel Huizdala	Finalist	
1990	Rian Malan	My Traitor's Heart: A South African Exile Returns to Face His Country, His Tribe, and His Conscience	Finalist	
1990	Rick Atkinson	The Long Gray Line: The American Journey of West Point's Class of 1966	Finalist	
1990	Kevin Phillips	The Blind Watchmaker	Finalist	
1991	E. J. Dionne, Jr.	Why Americans Hate Politics: The Death of the Democratic Process	Winner	
1991	Shelby Steele	The Content of Our Character: A New Vision of Race in America	Finalist	
1991	Daniel Yergin	The Prize: The Epic Quest for Oil, Money, and Power	Finalist	
1991	Nicholas Lemann	The Promised Land: The Great Black Migration and How It Changed America	Finalist	
1991	Alan Ehrenhalt	The United States of Ambition: Politicians, Power, and the Pursuit of Office	Finalist	
1992	Francis Fukuyama	The End of History and the Last Man	Winner	
1992	Thomas Byrne Edsall and Mary D. Edsall	Chain Reaction: The Impact of Race, Rights, and Taxes on American Politics	Finalist	
1992	James Davison Hunter	Culture Wars: The Struggle to Define America	Finalist	
1992	James B. Stewart	Den of Thieves	Finalist	
1992	Pico Iyer	The Lady and the Monk: Four Seasons in Kyoto	Finalist	
1993	Peter Skerry	Mexican Americans: The Ambivalent Minority	Winner	
1993	Doris May Lessing	African Laughter: Four Visits to Zimbabwe	Finalist	
1993	Randy Shilts	Conduct Unbecoming: Gays and Lesbians in the U.S. Military	Finalist	
1993	Paul Kennedy	Preparing for the Twenty-First Century	Finalist	
1993	David Brock	The Real Anita Hill	Finalist	
1994	Henry Kissinger	Diplomacy	Winner	
1994	Harry V. Jaffa	Original Intent and the Framers of the Constitution: A Disputed Question	Finalist	
1994	Brent Staples	Parallel Time: Growing Up in Black and White	Finalist	
1994	James Q. Wilson	The Moral Sense	Finalist	
1994	Katie Roiphe	The Morning After: Sex, Fear and Feminism on Campus	Finalist	
1995	Gregory Howard Williams	Life on the Color Line: The True Story of a White Boy Who Discovered He Was Black	Winner	
1995	Michael J. Piore	Beyond Individualism: How Social Demands of the New Identity Groups Challenge American Political and	Finalist	
1995	Nancy Abelmann and John Lie	Blue Dreams: Korean Americans and the Los Angeles Riots	Finalist	
1995	Sara McLanahan and Gary Sandefur	Growing Up With a Single Parent: What Hurts, What Helps	Finalist	
1995	Jeffrey Abramson	We, the Jury: The Jury System and the Ideal of Democracy	Finalist	
1996	Peter Maass	Love Thy Neighbor: A Story of War	Winner	
1996	Jonathan Harr	A Civil Action	Finalist	
1996	Fox Butterfield	All God's Children: The Bosket Family and the American Tradition of Violence	Finalist	
1996	Richard Kluger	Ashes to Ashes: America's Hundred-Year Cigarette War, the Public Health, and the Unabashed Triumph of Philip Morris	Finalist	
1996	John Hockenberry	Moving Violations: War Zones, Wheelchairs, and Declarations of Independence	Finalist	
1996	David Quammen	The Song of the Dodo: Island Biogeography in an Age of Extinctions	Finalist	
1996	Evan Thomas	The Very Best Men: Four Who Dared: The Early Years of the CIA	Finalist	
1996	Marc Parent	Turning Stones: My Days and Nights with Children at Risk	Finalist	
1997	Anne Fadiman	The Spirit Catches You and You Fall Down: A Hmong Child, Her American Doctors, and the Collision of Two Cultures	Winner	
1997	Jon Krakauer	Into Thin Air: A Personal Account of the Mount Everest Disaster	Finalist	
1997	Bernard Lefkowitz	Our Guys: The Glen Ridge Rape and the Secret Life of the Perfect Suburb	Finalist	
1997	Randall Kennedy	Race, Crime, and the Law	Finalist	
1997	Daniel Harris	The Rise and Fall of Gay Culture	Finalist	
1998	Philip Gourevitch	We Wish to Inform You That Tomorrow We Will Be Killed with Our Families: Stories from Rwanda	Winner	
1998	Russ Rymer	American Beach: A Saga of Race, Wealth, and Memory	Finalist	
1998	Cynthia Gorney	Articles of Faith: A Frontline History of the Abortion Wars	Finalist	
1998	William Finnegan	Cold New World: Growing Up in a Harder Country	Finalist	
1998	Cristina Rathbone	On the Outside Looking In: A Year in an Inner-City High School	Finalist	
1999	Mitchell Duneier with Ovie Carter (photographer)	Sidewalk	Winner	
1999	Leila Ahmed	A Border Passage: From Cairo to America—A Woman's Journey	Finalist	
1999	Richard A. Posner	An Affair of State: The Investigation, Impeachment, and Trial of President Clinton	Finalist	
1999	Mark Bowden	Black Hawk Down: A Story of Modern War	Finalist	
1999	Joshua Hammer	Chosen By God: A Brother's Journey	Finalist	
2000	Frances FitzGerald	Way Out There in the Blue: Reagan, Star Wars and the End of the Cold War	Winner	
2000	Patrick Tierney	Darkness in El Dorado: How Scientists and Journalists Devastated the Amazon	Finalist	
2000	S.L. Price	Pitching Around Fidel: A Journey into the Heart of Cuban Sports	Finalist	
2000	Ian Buruma	The Missionary and the Libertine: Love and War in East and West	Finalist	
2000	Sherwin B. Nuland	The Mysteries Within: A Surgeon Explores Myth, Medicine, and the Human Body	Finalist	
2001	Barbara Ehrenreich	Nickel and Dimed: On (Not) Getting by in America	Winner	
2001	Stanley Cohen	States of Denial: Knowing About Atrocities and Suffering	Finalist	
2001	Ann Crittenden	The Price of Motherhood: Why the Most Important Job in the World Is Still the Least Valued	Finalist	
2001	John W. Dean	The Rehnquist Choice: The Untold Story of the Nixon Appointment That Redefined the Supreme Court	Finalist	
2001	Ron Powers	Tom and Huck Don't Live Here Anymore	Finalist	
2002	Judith Levine	Harmful to Minors: The Perils of Protecting Children from Sex	Winner	
2002	Timothy Ferris	Seeing in the Dark: How Backyard Stargazers Are Probing Deep Space, and Guarding Earth from Interplanetary Peril	Finalist	
2002	Nicolaus Mills and Kira Brunner (editors)	The New Killing Fields: Massacre and the Politics of Intervention	Finalist	
2002	Kevin Phillips	Wealth and Democracy: A Political History of the American Rich	Finalist	
2002	Samantha Power	A Problem from Hell: America and the Age of Genocide	Finalist	
2003	Ross Terrill	The New Chinese Empire - And What It Means for the United States	Winner	
2003	Carlo Rotella	Cut Time: An Education at the Fights	Finalist	
2003	Anthony Swofford	Jarhead: A Marine's Chronicle of the Gulf War and Other Battles	Finalist	
2003	Jon Krakauer	Under the Banner of Heaven: A Story of Violent Faith	Finalist	
2003	Gerald Posner	Why America Slept: The Failure to Prevent 9/11	Finalist	
2004	Evan Wright	Generation Kill: Devil Dogs, Iceman, Captain America and the New Face of American War	Winner	
2004	Edward Conlon	Blue Blood	Finalist	
2004	Michael Dirda	Bound to Please	Finalist	
2004	Karen Armstrong	The Spiral Staircase: My Climb Out of Darkness	Finalist	
2004	Ann Patchett	Truth & Beauty: A Friendship	Finalist	
2005	Anthony Shadid	Night Draws Near: Iraq's People in the Shadow of America's War	Winner	
2005	Kurt Eichenwald	Conspiracy of Fools: A True Story	Finalist	
2005	Steve Bogira	Courtroom 302: A Year Behind the Scenes in an American Criminal Courthouse	Finalist	
2005	John Updike	Still Looking: Essays on American Art	Finalist	
2005	Jonathan Harr	The Lost Painting: The Quest for a Caravaggio Masterpiece	Finalist	
2006	Ian Buruma	Murder in Amsterdam: The Death of Theo van Gogh and the Limits of Tolerance	Winner	
2006	Rajiv Chandrasekaran	Imperial Life in the Emerald City: Inside Iraq's Green Zone	Finalist	
2006	Terri Jentz	Strange Piece of Paradise	Finalist	
2006	Alicia Drake	The Beautiful Fall: Lagerfeld, Saint Laurent, and Glorious Excess in 1970s Paris	Finalist	
2006	Douglas Brinkley	The Great Deluge: Hurricane Katrina, New Orleans, and the Mississippi Gulf Coast	Finalist	
2007	Elizabeth D. Samet	Soldier's Heart: Reading Literature Through Peace and War at West Point	Winner	
2007	Ishmael Beah	A Long Way Gone: Memoirs of a Boy Soldier	Finalist	
2007	Tom Bissell	The Father of All Things: A Marine, His Son, and the Legacy of Vietnam	Finalist	
2007	Ronald Brownstein	The Second Civil War: How Extreme Partisanship Has Paralyzed Washington and Polarized America	Finalist	
2007	Naomi Klein	The Shock Doctrine: The Rise of Disaster Capitalism	Finalist	
2008	Barton Gellman	Angler: The Cheney Vice Presidency	Winner	
2008	Jill Bolte Taylor	My Stroke of Insight: A Brain Scientist's Personal Journey	Finalist	
2008	Steve Coll	The Bin Ladens: An Arabian Family in the American Century	Finalist	
2008	Jane Mayer	The Dark Side: The Inside Story of How the War on Terror Turned into a War on American Ideals	Finalist	
2008	Dexter Filkins	The Forever War	Finalist	
2009	Dave Eggers	Zeitoun	Winner	
2009	Dave Cullen	Columbine	Finalist	
2009	Nicholas D. Kristof and Sheryl WuDunn	Half the Sky: Turning Oppression into Opportunity for Women Worldwide	Finalist	
2009	Tracy Kidder	Strength in What Remains: A Journey of Remembrance and Forgiveness	Finalist	
2009	T.R. Reid	The Healing of America: A Global Quest for Better, Cheaper, and Fairer Health Care	Finalist	
2010	Michael Lewis	The Big Short: Inside the Doomsday Machine	Winner	
2010	Bethany McLean and Joe Nocera	All the Devils Are Here: The Hidden History of the Financial Crisis	Finalist	
2010	Patti Smith	Just Kids	Finalist	
2010	Jonathan Alter	The Promise: President Obama, Year One	Finalist	
2010	Sebastian Junger	War	Finalist	
2011	Daniel Kahneman	Thinking, Fast and Slow	Winner	
2011	Ioan Grillo	El Narco: Inside Mexico's Criminal Insurgency	Finalist	
2011	Alex Bellos	Is That a Fish in Your Ear?: Translation and the Meaning of Everything	Finalist	
2011	Anatol Lieven	Pakistan: A Hard Country	Finalist	
2011	Seth Mnookin	The Panic Virus: A True Story of Medicine, Science, and Fear	Finalist	
2012	Katherine Boo	Behind the Beautiful Forevers: Life, Death and Hope in a Mumbai Slum	Winner	
2012	Jim Sterba	Nature Wars: The Incredible Story of How Wildlife Comebacks Turned Backyards into Battlegrounds	Finalist	
2012	Karen Elliott House	On Saudi Arabia: Its People, Past, Religion, Fault Lines—and Future	Finalist	
2012	Steve Coll	Private Empire: ExxonMobil and American Power	Finalist	
2012	Jake Tapper	The Outpost: An Untold Story of American Valor	Finalist	
2013	Sheri Fink	Five Days at Memorial: Life and Death in a Storm-Ravaged Hospital	Winner	
2013	Charlie LeDuff	Detroit: An American Autopsy	Finalist	
2013	Lawrence Wright	Going Clear: Scientology, Hollywood, and the Prison of Belief	Finalist	
2013	Barry Siegel	Manifest Injustice: The True Story of a Convicted Murderer and the Lawyers Who Fought for His Freedom	Finalist	
2013	David Finkel	Thank You for Your Service	Finalist	
2014	Jeff Hobbs	The Short and Tragic Life of Robert Peace: A Brilliant Young Man Who Left Newark for the Ivy League	Winner	
2014	Atul Gawande	Being Mortal: Medicine and What Matters in the End	Finalist	
2014	Bryan Stevenson	Just Mercy: A Story of Justice and Redemption	Finalist	
2014	Matt Taibbi	The Divide: American Injustice in the Age of the Wealth Gap	Finalist	
2014	Héctor Tobar	Deep Down Dark: The Untold Stories of 33 Men Buried in a Chilean Mine, and the Miracle That Set Them Free	Finalist	
2015	Sarah Chayes	Thieves of State: Why Corruption Threatens Global Security	Winner	
2015	Joe Domanick	Blue: The LAPD and the Battle to Redeem American Policing	Finalist	
2015	Sandy Tolan	Children of the Stone: The Power of Music in a Hard Land	Finalist	
2015	Sam Quinones	Dreamland: The True Tale of America's Opiate Epidemic	Finalist	
2015	Stephen Witt	How Music Got Free: The End of an Industry, the Turn of the Century	Finalist	
2016	Svetlana Alexievich with Bela Shayevich (trans.)	Secondhand Time: The Last of the Soviets	Winner	
2016	Robert F. Worth	A Rage for Order: The Middle East in Turmoil, from Tahrir Square to ISIS	Finalist	
2016	Ben Rawlence	City of Thorns: Nine Lives in the World's Largest Refugee Camp	Finalist	
2016	Jane Mayer	Dark Money: The Hidden History of the Billionaires Behind the Rise of the Radical Right	Finalist	
2016	Matthew Desmond	Evicted: Poverty and Profit in the American City	Finalist	
2017	Nancy MacLean	Democracy in Chains: The Deep History of the Radical Right's Stealth Plan for America	Winner	
2017	James Forman Jr.	Locking Up Our Own: Crime and Punishment in Black America	Finalist	
2017	Rick Wartzman	The End of Loyalty: The Rise and Fall of Good Jobs in America	Finalist	
2017	Lauren Markham	The Far Away Brothers: Two Young Migrants and the Making of an American Life	Finalist	
2017	Ta-Nehisi Coates	We Were Eight Years in Power: An American Tragedy	Finalist	
2018	Francisco Cantu	The Line Becomes a River: Dispatches From the Border	Winner	
2019	Emily Bazelon	Charged: The New Movement to Transform American Prosecution and End Mass Incarceration	Winner	
2019	Mark Arax	The Dreamt Land: Chasing Water and Dust Across California	Finalist	
2019	Ronan Farrow	Catch and Kill: Lies, Spies, and a Conspiracy to Protect Predators	Finalist	
2019	Dina Nayeri	The Ungrateful Refugee: What Immigrants Never Tell You	Finalist	
2019	Rachel Louise Snyder	No Visible Bruises: What We Don't Know About Domestic Violence Can Kill Us	Finalist	
2020	Isabel Wilkerson	Caste: The Origins of Our Discontents	Winner	
2020	Brittany K. Barnett	A Knock at Midnight: A Story of Hope, Justice, and Freedom	Finalist	
2020	Karla Cornejo Villavicencio	The Undocumented Americans	Finalist	
2020	Christine Montross	Waiting for an Echo: The Madness of American Incarceration	Finalist	
2020	Jacob Soboroff	Separated: Inside an American Tragedy	Finalist	
2021	Adam Schiff	Midnight in Washington: How We Almost Lost Our Democracy and Still Could	Winner	
2021	Andrea Elliott	Invisible Child: Poverty, Survival & Hope in an American City	Finalist	
2021	Heather McGhee	The Sum of Us: What Racism Costs Everyone and How We Can Prosper Together	Finalist	
2021	Reuben Jonathan Miller	Halfway Home: Race, Punishment, and the Afterlife of Mass Incarceration	Finalist	
2021	Evan Osnos	Wildland: The Making of America's Fury	Finalist	
2022	Dahlia Lithwick	Lady Justice: Women, the Law, and the Battle to Save America	Winner	
2022	Anand Giridharadas	The Persuaders: At the Front Lines of the Fight for Hearts, Minds, and Democracy	Finalist	
2022	Sarah Kendzior	They Knew: How a Culture of Conspiracy Keeps America Complacent	Finalist	
2022	Luke Mogelson	The Storm is Here: An American Crucible	Finalist	
2022	Dorothy Roberts	Torn Apart: How the Child Welfare System Destroys Black Families — and How Abolition Can Build a Safer World	Finalist	
2023	Roxanna Asgarian	We Were Once A Family: A Story of Love, Death, and Child Removal in America	Winner	
2023	Bettina L. Love	Punished for Dreaming: How School Reform Harms Black Children and How We Heal	Finalist	
2023	Cameron McWhirter and Zusha Elinson	American Gun: The True Story of the AR-15	Finalist	
2023	Christina Sharpe	Ordinary Notes	Finalist	
2023	Raja Shehadeh	We Could Have Been Friends, My Father and I: A Palestinian Memoir	Finalist	
