= Adolph Mongo =

American political advisor

Personal details
- Born: January 15, 1954 (age 72) Detroit, Michigan
- Party: Democratic Party
- Education: University of Michigan (B.G.S.); Defense Information School (Photo-Journalism Certificate); Wayne State University (MA)
- Occupation: Newspaper reporter, radio host, political consultant, podcaster
- Website: Official Website

Military service
- Allegiance: United States
- Branch/service: United States Marine Corps
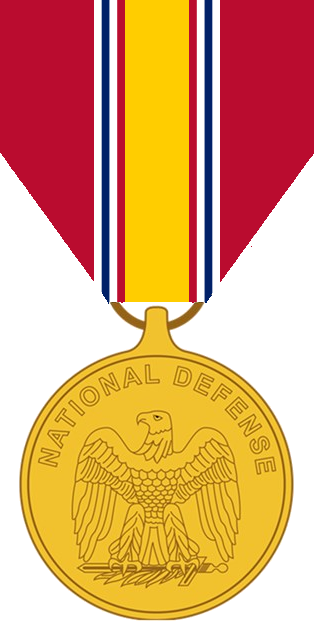
- Awards

Adolph Mongo (born January 15, 1954) is “a prominent political voice in Detroit,” who has served as a political advisor, newspaper reporter, radio host, and podcaster. As of August 2023, Mongo resides in Detroit, Michigan.

== Personal life ==
Mongo was born on January 15, 1954, in Detroit, Michigan, and was raised in Royal Oak Township where he attended Oak Park public schools.

While a junior at Oak Park High School, Mongo was managing editor of "The Eagle American," the high school newspaper. Mongo was the first African-American student to hold the position. During his senior year, Mongo helped to lead the school to its first state championship in track, where he earned All State Honors.

== Education ==
In 1972, Mongo was awarded the WJR Scholarship in Broadcast Journalism as an incoming freshman at the University of Michigan in Ann Arbor. In May 1976, Mongo graduated, receiving his bachelor's degree with honors. Mongo later attended Wayne State University, where he received a master's degree in labor history in 1999.

== Military service ==
Following undergraduate, Mongo joined the U.S. Marine Corps Reserves. Mongo received a certificate in photo journalism from the Defense Information School (DINFOS) in 1978.

== Media career ==
From 1978 until 1983, Mongo worked as a reporter for the "Colorado Springs Sun", "Frederick News-Post," the "South Haven (Michigan) Daily Tribune" and the "Michigan Chronicle" newspapers.

For seven years, Mongo hosted "Detroit in Black & White," a two-hour radio show on 910 AM Superstation/WFDF. In February 2023, Mongo left 910AM Superstation/WFDF and started a podcast titled "Detroit in Black and White." The podcast first aired on February 25, 2023, and the first two podcasts had over 3,000 hits.

Mongo has also appeared on the CNBC television program "American Greed," as well as CNN's "Anthony Bourdain: Parts Unknown."

Mongo has been featured as an expert in Detroit politics by newspapers and publications throughout the United States, including: "PBS," "The Weekly Standard," "The New York Times," "The Washington Post," and "GQ."

Mongo has contributed as a columnist to "The Detroit News," "The Michigan Chronicle," "The Michigan Citizen," "Deadline Detroit," and has been a regular guest on 92.3 FM (WMXD), Fox 2 News "Let It Rip," WDIV (NBC) "Flash Point," CBS Detroit, and "The Detroit News" web program "Hold the Onions."

Two of Mongo's newspaper advertisements, "Lynching is Still Legal in America" and "Sometimes a handshake and an acknowledgment makes a difference," sparked nationwide controversy in 2005 and 2006.

Mongo is spotlighted in chapter thirteen of Tim Skubick's book, "See Dick and Jen Run" (2006). Skubick highlights Mongo's involvement in the 2006 race for Michigan governor. Mongo is also featured in Charlie LeDuff's, book, "Detroit: An American Autopsy," in a chapter titled "Mongo."

== Political career ==
In April, 1968, after the assassination of Martin Luther King Jr. Mongo organized a walkout in his school to protest the administration's decision not to let students leave early to attend church service. During his senior year in high school, Mongo was elected student mayor of Oak Park. Mongo won, making him the first African-American student to hold that office.

From 1984 until 1991, Mongo was deputy director of public information under Detroit mayor Coleman A. Young.

Mongo was also a consultant for Matty Moroun, the owner of the Ambassador Bridge that links Detroit to Canada. The Ambassador Bridge is the busiest international crossing in the U.S.

In 1998, Mongo led a protest against the Detroit Medical Center after a supervisor at Sinai Hospital posted a sign stating "no black people allow" outside a patient's room. The supervisor was later fired.

In 2007, Mongo campaigned for the release of three black students falsely accused of killing a woman from Taylor, Michigan.

In April 2011, Mongo led a boycott against the Detroit NAACP's 56th Annual Fight for Freedom Fund Dinner and called for NAACP president Rev. Wendell Anthony to resign his position after Anthony had honoured Kid Rock at a dinner. Mongo said that Anthony's actions were "making it OK for people like Kid Rock to fly the … confederate flag". Kid Rock had previously displayed the Confederate flag in concerts.

In 2016, Mongo ran State Senator Coleman Young II's campaign for mayor of Detroit, against incumbent Mayor Mike Duggan. In 2018, Mongo was the campaign manager for Coleman Young II's campaign for the Democratic nomination in Michigan's 13th Congressional District. The seat was vacant, due to the resignation of John Conyers.
