= Invisible Child =

Invisible Child may refer to:

- Invisible Child (film), 1999 film
- Invisible Child: Poverty, Survival & Hope in an American City, 2021 nonfiction book by Andrea Elliott
- The Invisible Child, one of the stories in Tales from Moominvalley written by Tove Jansson
