= List of killings by law enforcement officers in the United States, May 2018 =

This is a list of people reported killed by non-military law enforcement officers in the United States in May 2018, whether in the line of duty or not, and regardless of reason or method. The listing documents the occurrence of a death, making no implications regarding wrongdoing or justification on the part of the person killed or officer involved. Killings are arranged by date of the incident that caused death. Different death dates, if known, are noted in the description. The table below lists 93 people.

== May 2018 ==
Date	Name (age) of deceased	Race	State (city)	Description
2018-5-29	Zane James (19)	White	Utah (Cottonwood Heights)	Police say James was pursued for suspicion of robbery and was shot when he reached into his pocket. James had a pellet gun in his pocket. James's parents claim city officials described body camera footage of the shooting to them, but police deny that the officer's body cam was on.
2018-5-23	Claudia Gómez González (20)	Hispanic	Texas (Rio Bravo)	Gómez González was a Guatemalan woman shot by a US Border Patrol agent, on May 23, 2018, after crossing the US-Mexican border near Rio Bravo, Texas.
2018-05-21	Ronald Clinton (47)	Black	Arkansas (West Memphis)	Clinton, an individual from Memphis, Tennessee who had a lengthy criminal record, led police on a lengthy car on I-40 during rush hour traffic. After a collision with a police officer's vehicle which caused Clinton to crash, he allegedly acted in a threatening manner which resulted in multiple officers opening fire, killing Clinton.
2018-05-20	Bradley Grant (36)	White	Kentucky (Baxter)	Police were investigating the beating and molestation of a child when they noticed Grant standing on his front deck. Despite the child's mother saying he was not the abuser, police followed Grant inside without a warrant. When they did, Grant held a shotgun to his head, and a police detective shot him.
2018-05-14	Marcus-David Peters (24)	Black	Virginia (Richmond)	During a mental crisis Peters was having, he stripped naked and ran onto the freeway. After a taser failed to work, a black police officer fired his weapon, killing Peters.
2018-05-10	Keeven Robinson (22)	Black	Louisiana (Jefferson Parish)	Robinson was the target of a narcotics investigation. When officers found and tried to arrest him at a gas station, he fled, first by car and then (after a crash) on foot. Robinson died while being subdued. Police believed his asthma was the cause, but an autopsy determined he had been asphyxiated "by another". Robinson was unarmed, but there was a gun in his car.
2018-05-31	Ricardo Cisneros Piceno (39)	Hispanic	Dinuba, CA	
2018-05-31	Jerick Raheem Gray (42)	Black	Thomasville, NC	
2018-05-31	Katherine Brazeau (46)	White	Fullerton, CA	
2018-05-30	Juvon Leroy Simon (23)	Black	Homestead, FL	
2018-05-30	Bryan Alexander Rodriguez (29)	Hispanic	Los Angeles, CA	
2018-05-29	Armando Arellano Osuna (51)	Hispanic	Riverbank, CA	
2018-05-29	Rabi Brown (34)	Native American	Arizona (Phoenix)	
2018-05-28	Michael Glad (23)	White	Taylorsville, UT	
2018-05-27	Raul Rivera (42)	Hispanic	San Diego, CA	
2018-05-27	Eugene Baylis (67)	White	Grand Junction, CO	
2018-05-27	William Hamilton ()	Unknown race	Everton, MO	
2018-05-26	Homer Woodroe Tyler (51)	White	Silsbee, TX	
2018-05-25	Albert Guerra Jr. (35)	Hispanic	Lubbock, TX	
2018-05-25	Augustine Oliva (29)	Hispanic	Dumas, TX	
2018-05-25	Rocky Lee (57)	White	Stagecoach, TX	
2018-05-25	Jon Jay Lewis ()	White	Hammett, ID	
2018-05-24	Dustin Brian Montano (31)	White	Fort Morgan, CO	
2018-05-24	Dustin D. Odom (30)	White	Citra, FL	
2018-05-24	Brett Luengo (33)	White	Cleveland, OH	
2018-05-23	Joshua M. Gomoll (25)	White	Neenah, WI	
2018-05-23	Makell Meyerin (31)	White	Gurnee, IL	
2018-05-23	Eddie James Morris (46)	Black	Tallahassee, FL	
2018-05-22	Martin Sandejo (49)	Hispanic	Mathis, TX	
2018-05-21	Donald Whitmer Jr. (45)	White	West Melbourne, FL	
2018-05-21	Ronda Ebeling (23)	White	Joshua Tree, CA	
2018-05-21	Ray Wyatt (58)	White	Joshua Tree, CA	
2018-05-20	Corey Cordova (30)	White	Columbus, OH	
2018-05-19	Santiago Evans-Valencia (36)	Hispanic	Pueblo, CO	
2018-05-19	Jimmy Alan Moss (77)	White	Carson City, NV	
2018-05-18	Joseph Demel ()	White	Livonia, MI	
2018-05-18	Dmitri Bullard (24)	White	Gresham, OR	
2018-05-18	Reynaldo Peña (29)	Hispanic	Laredo, TX	
2018-05-17	Daniel Timothy Johnson (34)	White	Norman, OK	
2018-05-16	Kevin Nickle (59)	White	Martins Ferry, OH	
2018-05-15	David M. Romansky (34)	White	Lake Mary, FL	
2018-05-14	Rollie J. Davis Sr. (53)	White	Quincy, IL	
2018-05-14	William N. Derick (54)	White	Wales, ME	
2018-05-14	Bob Browning Cruz (36)	Hispanic	San Antonio, TX	
2018-05-14	Anthony Trice Jr. (24)	Black	Clinton, MD	
2018-05-14	Cody Reynolds (20)	White	Royal Oak, MI	
2018-05-13	James Collins Jr (38)	Unknown race	Dearborn Heights, MI	
2018-05-13	Willie Rogers Marable (29)	Black	Portsmouth, VA	
2018-05-13	James Brian Kay (54)	Unknown race	Carnesville, GA	
2018-05-13	Philip Steven McMichael (36)	White	Amite, LA	
2018-05-13	Name Withheld ()	Hispanic	Forest Park, GA	
2018-05-12	Darrell J. Bruffy (55)	White	Columbus, OH	
2018-05-11	Jacob T. Eldridge (24)	Native American	Blackfoot, ID	
2018-05-11	Kelly Gene Abbott (51)	White	Granton, WI	
2018-05-11	Bradley Daniel Webster (52)	White	Talihina, OK	
2018-05-11	Barry Freeman (51)	White	Evansville, IN	
2018-05-11	Benjamin Lee Sellers (33)	White	Haughton, LA	
2018-05-10	Kenneth Carter (46)	White	Morristown, TN	
2018-05-10	Michael Hutchman (33)	White	New Kensington, PA	
2018-05-09	Elliot Reed (30)	Black	Jackson, MS	
2018-05-08	Thomas Junior Garcia (45)	Hispanic	Greeley, CO	
2018-05-08	John R. Simson (65)	White	Lancaster, PA	
2018-05-08	Charles Hutchison (37)	Black	Arizona (Tucson)	
2018-05-08	Giovanny Leon (23)	Hispanic	Arizona (Mesa)	
2018-05-08	Phillip Cameron Gibson II (37)	White	Glade Spring, VA	
2018-05-08	Amy Fanion (51)	White	Westfield, MA	
2018-05-07	Kimberley Ray McCann (55)	White	Rome, GA	
2018-05-07	Peter Boden (48)	White	Hackett, AR	
2018-05-07	Juan Alberto Silva (32)	Hispanic	Orlando, FL	
2018-05-07	Lisa Rivera (49)	Hispanic	Yuma, AZ	
2018-05-07	Albert Odom (26)	White	Tulsa, OK	
2018-05-07	David J. Robinson (50)	White	Appleton, WI	
2018-05-06	Franklin Robert Vaughn (39)	White	Seminole, OK	
2018-05-06	David P. Wolosin (38)	White	Casper, WY	
2018-05-06	Dwight Dearth (73)	White	Fairview, OH	
2018-05-06	Terence Leslie (32)	Black	East Point, GA	
2018-05-06	Jose Chavez (25)	Hispanic	Los Angeles, CA	
2018-05-05	Savannah Hill (21)	White	Aurora, MO	
2018-05-05	Matthew Mathison (59)	Unknown race	San Antonio, TX	
2018-05-05	Mitchell Simmons (24)	White	Dayton, OH	
2018-05-05	Stephen Charles Arthur (51)	White	Arizona (Tempe)	
2018-05-04	John Corneil (54)	Unknown race	Oakfield, ME	
2018-05-04	Christopher A. Wolfe (21)	White	Terre Haute, IN	
2018-05-03	Anthony Trujillo (26)	Hispanic	Orosi, CA	
2018-05-03	Sean Louis Justice aka Sean Louis Justin (28)	White	Sandia, TX	
2018-05-02	Damion "Dae-Dae" Collier (24)	Black	Columbus, GA	
2018-05-02	Billy "Boomer" Pike Jr. (49)	White	Liberty, NC	
2018-05-02	Timothy Raye Mayfield (67)	Black	Dallas, TX	
2018-05-02	Manuel Palacio (27)	Hispanic	Kansas City, KS	
2018-05-02	Jason Wayne Traversie (44)	White	Box Elder, SD	
2018-05-01	Name Withheld ()	Unknown race	Quartzsite, AZ	
2018-05-01	Name Withheld ()	Unknown race	San Antonio, TX	
2018-05-01	Roger Fortner (49)	White	League City, TX	

== See also ==
- Death in custody § United States
- Henry A. Wallace Police Crime Public Database
- List of cases of police brutality
- List of countries with annual rates and counts for killings by law enforcement officers
- List of law enforcement officers killed in the line of duty in the United States
- List of law enforcement officers convicted for an on-duty killing in the United States
- List of police reforms related to the George Floyd protests
- List of unarmed African Americans killed by law enforcement officers in the United States
- Lists of killings by law enforcement officers
- Police brutality in the United States
- Police misconduct § United States
- Police riot § United States
- Police use of deadly force in the United States
