= Christina Sharpe =

Scholar of English literature and Black Studies

Christina Elizabeth Sharpe
- Born: 1965 (age 60–61); Pennsylvania, United States
- Occupation: Professor

Academic background
- Education: University of Pennsylvania (BA, 1987); Cornell University (MA, PhD, 1999)

Academic work
- Notable works: Monstrous Intimacies (2010); In the Wake: On Blackness and Being (2016); Ordinary Notes (2023)

Christina Elizabeth Sharpe (born 1965) is an American academic who is a professor of English literature and Black studies at York University in Toronto. Christina Sharpe is Canada Research Chair in Black Studies in the Humanities at York University, and in 2024 she was awarded the Guggenheim Fellowship.

== Early life and education ==
Sharpe was born in Pennsylvania. Raised Catholic, Sharpe attended various parochial, private, and public schools as a child.

She received a bachelor's degree in English and Africana studies from the University of Pennsylvania in 1987, having studied abroad at the University of Ibadan in Nigeria. She completed a master's degree and a doctorate at Cornell University; her dissertation was on African writer Bessie Head.

== Career ==
Sharpe's work spans Black visual studies, Black queer studies, and mid-nineteenth century to contemporary African-American literature and culture.

Her research has also extended into Black visual studies through the critical analysis of Blackness in visual media. Her work makes a point that such visual representations can either further or resist colonial and racial narratives, looking at how Black artists engage with and sometimes fight against these narratives.

=== Books ===
She is the author of In the Wake: On Blackness and Being, Monstrous Intimacies: Making Post-Slavery Subjects, and Ordinary Notes. She wrote a critical introduction to Nomenclature: New and Collected Poems of Dionne Brand.

Sharpe is best known for the influential concept of "wake work" that she details in her book In the Wake: On Blackness and Being, which was published in 2016. In the book, she probes into the legacies of the Atlantic slave trade on the lives of Black people and how that manifests in their contemporary social, cultural, and political lives. "Wake work" calls for insurgent engagement with the ways that Black life and death are figured by anti-Blackness, into practices of survival, remembrance, and resistance in African culture. In the Wake garnered acclaim for its blend of personal narrative with a combination of historical and theoretical analysis. It was named a best book of 2016 by The Guardian and The Walrus.

Her previous book was Monstrous Intimacies: Making Post-Slavery Subjects, published in 2010. The book explores ways in which narration, relation, and representation come together to create Black subjects and identities in a post-chattel slavery era. Throughout the book, Sharpe investigates how the legacies of chattel slavery, colonialism, and racial violence continue to be present in Black communities and uses critical race theory, psychoanalysis, and cultural studies to analyze these times.

Ordinary Notes (2023) gathered a range of responses. Kirkus Reviews described it as "an exquisitely original celebration of American Blackness," highlighting Sharpe's integration of diverse forms and topics. Similarly, The New York Times noted how Sharpe's collection of notes serves as a radical reading of Black life, presenting an alternative to popular misconceptions. However, some critics have pointed out challenges related to the book's fragmented format. The Chicago Review of Books mentioned that while the versatile form supports the ambitious range of subjects, the kaleidoscopic structure might make it difficult for readers looking for a traditional narrative arc. Ordinary Notes was named a best book of the year by The New York Times, The Atlantic, The New Yorker, The Globe and Mail, The Toronto Star, and NPR.

=== Teaching and research ===
Sharpe was employed at Hobart and William Smith Colleges from 1996 to 1998. From 1998 until 2018, she held positions at Tufts University. Awarded tenure in 2005, Sharpe became a full professor in 2017. She was the first Black woman to be awarded tenure in the English department at Tufts.

Sharpe is a senior research associate at the Centre for the Study of Race, Gender & Class (RGC) at the University of Johannesburg. She is a professor and research chair in Black Studies in the Department of Humanities at York University. She received a Guggenheim Fellowship in 2024 and a fellowship from the Pierre Elliott Trudeau Foundation in 2026.

== Awards ==
Year	Nominated work	Award	Category	Result	Ref.
2017	In the Wake	Hurston/Wright Legacy Award	Nonfiction	Finalist	
2023	Ordinary Notes	Hilary Weston Writers' Trust Prize for Nonfiction		Winner	
2023	Ordinary Notes	National Book Award	Nonfiction	Finalist	
2023	Ordinary Notes	National Book Critics Circle Awards	Nonfiction	Finalist	
2023	Ordinary Notes	Los Angeles Times Book Prize	Current Interest	Finalist	
2024	Ordinary Notes	James Tait Black Memorial Prize	Biography	Finalist	
2024		Windham–Campbell Literature Prizes	Nonfiction	Winner	
2024		Molson Prize	Social Sciences and Humanities	Winner	
2024		Guggenheim Fellowship		Winner	
2025		Killam Prize	Humanities	Winner	

== Bibliography ==
- Monstrous Intimacies: Making Post-Slavery Subjects. Duke University Press, 2010.
- In the Wake: On Blackness and Being. Duke University Press, 2016.
- Ordinary Notes. Farrar, Straus and Giroux, 2023.
