= The Undocumented Americans =

2020 book by Karla Cornejo Villavicencio

- Author: Karla Cornejo Villavicencio
- Genre: Non-fiction
- Publisher: Penguin Random House
- Publication date: 2020
- Pages: 208
- ISBN: 9780399592706

The Undocumented Americans is a 2020 book of nonfiction written by Ecuadorian-American author Karla Cornejo Villavicencio. The stories within follow the lives of undocumented immigrants in the United States. It incorporates memoirs and investigative journalism about the learning of cultural differences, what it means to be undocumented in the U.S., and what their daily lives look like.

== Awards ==
The book is recognized as a finalist for the National Book Award, the NBCC John Leonard Award, and the Los Angeles Times Book Prize. It also made the longlist for the Andrew Carnegie Medals for Excellence in Fiction and Nonfiction. The book was also named as one of the New York Times Notable Books of the Year and NPR: Books We Love.
