= The Los Angeles River: Its Life, Death, and Possible Rebirth =

- Author: Blake Gumprecht
- Language: English
- Published: 1999
- Publisher: Johns Hopkins University Press
- Publication place: United States
- Media type: Print
- Pages: 369 pp
- ISBN: 978-0-8018-6047-8

The Los Angeles River: Its Life, Death, and Possible Rebirth is a 1999 non-fiction book by American writer Blake Gumprecht.

== Overview ==
An investigative look into the history of the Los Angeles River and the crucial role it played in the settlement and growth of Los Angeles.

== Article ==
A December 8, 2003, article by writer Charlie LeDuff for The New York Times entitled Los Angeles by Kayak: Vistas of Concrete Banks was accused of drawing from The Los Angeles River: Its Life, Death, and Possible Rebirth. One week later, on December 15, 2003, The New York Times appended a clarification:

An article last Monday about the Los Angeles River recounted its history and described the reporter's trip downriver in a kayak. In research for the article, the reporter consulted a 1999 book by Blake Gumprecht, "The Los Angeles River: Its Life, Death, and Possible Rebirth." Several passages relating facts and lore about the river distilled passages from the book. Although the facts in those passages were confirmed independently—through other sources or the reporter's first hand observation—the article should have acknowledged the significant contribution of Mr. Gumprecht's research.

— Editors' Note, December 15, 2003

LeDuff discussed various accusations made against his reporting in a March 11, 2008 interview with essayist Dan Schneider.
