= United Gates of America =

- Genre: Documentary
- Directed by: Alex Cooke
- Starring: Charlie LeDuff
- Country of origin: United Kingdom
- Original language: English

Production
- Producers: Farah Durrani; Alex Cooke; Charlie LeDuff
- Editor: Johnny Burke
- Running time: 60 minutes

Original release
- Network: BBC Four
- Release: 14 August 2006

United Gates of America is a 2006 BBC television documentary directed by Alex Cooke, featuring journalist Charlie LeDuff. He lived for a month within the gated community of Canyon Lake in Riverside County, California, to try and discover why people wanted to lock themselves behind gates and fences, and what effect it had on the residents. The documentary also explored the issues of immigration from Mexico and Central America, and highlighted the issues of segregation and racism that exist in the United States.

The one-hour made-for-TV documentary premiered on British TV channel BBC Four in 2006, with ongoing repeat showings. The film also appeared at the 2007 Ann Arbor Film Festival, the USA Film Festival, and the Santa Barbara International Film Festival.

The film met with positive reviews. Ian Johns of The Times (London) found LeDuff to be "an acute interviewer and astute observer in this entertaining documentary." TV Scoop found it "hilarious", emphasizing LeDuff's style: "He just ambles along, asking simple questions before pouncing Columbo-like with a killer last line. 'Oh look, there's a Mexican over there....gardening.' " Matt Kettman of the Santa Barbara Independent wrote that the documentary was "eye-opening", "hilarious, probing, and meaningful," and that LeDuff "does not draw any solid conclusions for the viewer. We are left wondering whether these Canyon Lake residents are paranoid or correct."

Soon after filming completed, Sharon Rice, the assistant editor of Canyon Lake's The Friday Flyer wrote an open letter to LeDuff listing a large number of "good people" and activities not covered in the documentary. Three residents of Canyon Lake who later previewed the film were "disgusted by it" enough to write letters to the editor. After the show was broadcast in the UK, and the UK tabloid In the Know labeled Canyon Lake "The World's Most Paranoid Town", the editor again wrote that the film omitted truthful positive information about the "little bit of paradise."
