= Canyon Lake, California =

City in California, United States

- City
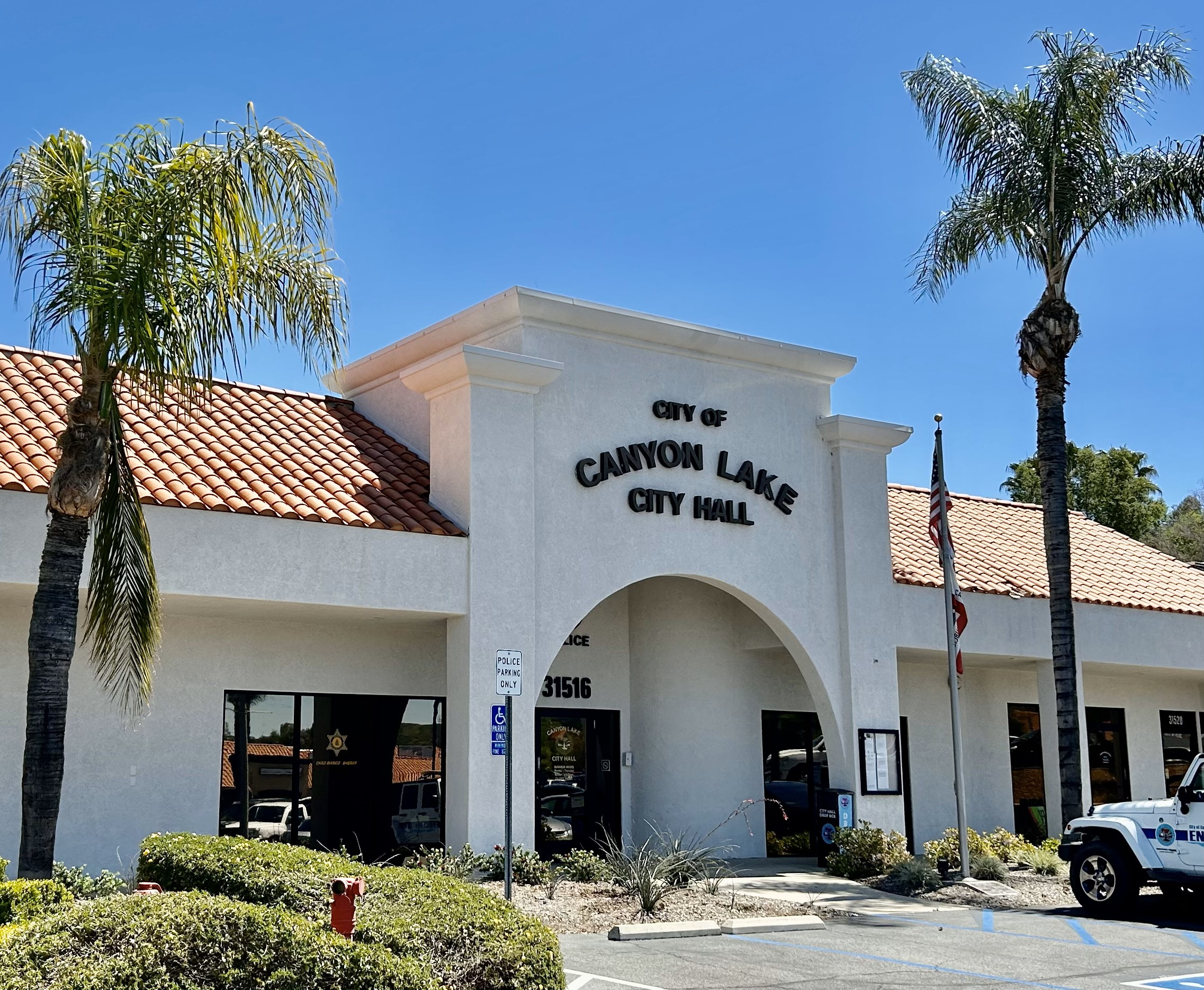
- Canyon Lake City Hall

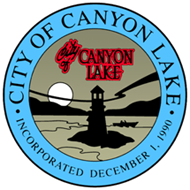
- Seal
- Interactive map of Canyon Lake, California
- Location in the United States
- Coordinates: 33°41′3″N 117°15′20″W
- Country: United States
- State: California
- County: Riverside
- Incorporated: December 1, 1990

Government
  - Type: Council-Manager
  - Mayor: Mark Terry
  - Mayor Pro Tem: Kasey Castillo
  - City Council: Jeremy Smith; Josh Steeber; Dale Welty
  - City Manager: Arron Brown

Area
  - Total: 4.66 sq mi (12.07 km^{2})
  - Land: 3.92 sq mi (10.15 km^{2})
  - Water: 0.74 sq mi (1.92 km^{2}) 15.92%
- Elevation: 1,385 ft (422 m)

Population (2020)
  - Total: 11,082
  - Estimate (2024): 11,161
  - Density: 2,827.8/sq mi (1,091.82/km^{2})
- Time zone: UTC-8 (Pacific)
  - Summer (DST): UTC-7 (PDT)
- ZIP code: 92587
- Area code: 951
- FIPS code: 06-10928
- GNIS feature IDs: 1668254, 2409979
- Website: www.canyonlakeca.gov

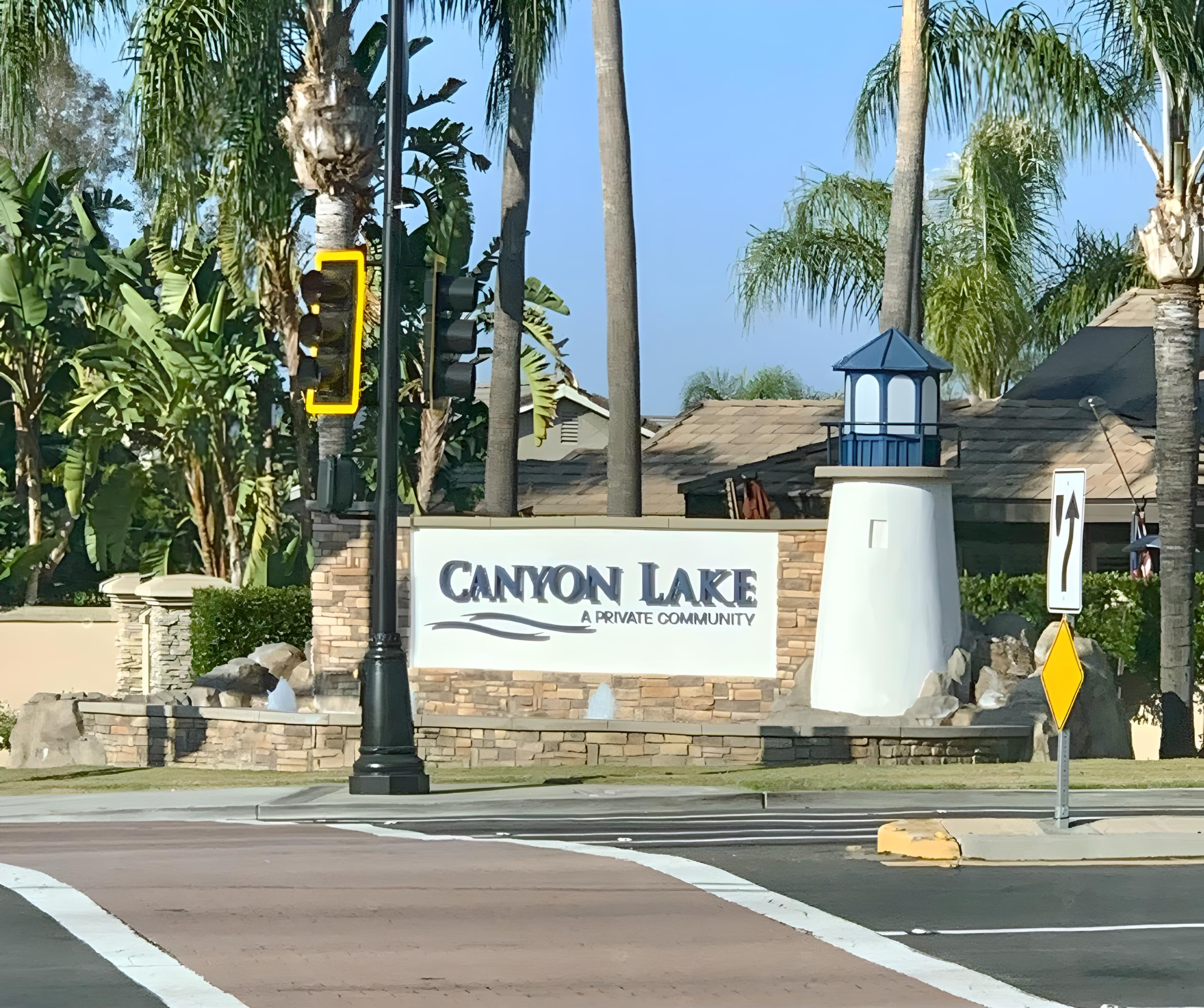
Entry monument to the Canyon Lake gated community

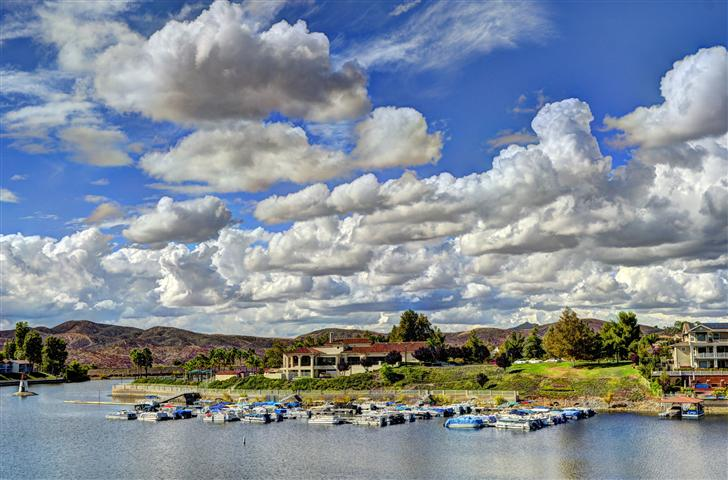
Canyon Lake Lodge

Canyon Lake is a city and gated community in the Inland Empire region of Riverside County, California, United States, located on Canyon Lake reservoir. Canyon Lake began as a master-planned community developed by the Corona Land Company in 1968. The City of Canyon Lake was incorporated on December 1, 1990. As of the 2020 census, Canyon Lake had a population of 11,082. Railroad Canyon Dam was built in 1927, and impounds the San Jacinto River to fill the reservoir, which covers 383 acres (1.55 km^{2}) and has 14.9 miles (24.0 km) of shoreline.

== History ==
=== Etymology ===
The city of Canyon Lake is named after the reservoir it is built around. Initially, the reservoir was known as Railroad Canyon Reservoir, or Railroad Canyon Lake, but now the reservoir and the community are referred to by the shortened form, Canyon Lake.

=== Early history ===
In 1882, the California Southern Railroad built a line from Perris to Elsinore along the east side of the San Jacinto River. The Santa Fe Railroad bought the line and joined it with their line in San Bernardino. Floods in 1884, 1916, and 1927 washed out the tracks, and the Santa Fe Railroad decided to abandon the line. Soon after the last flood, the Temescal Water Company bought the railroad right-of-way, as well as 1,000 acres (400 ha) from Henry Evans, a rancher, and another land from B.T. Kuert. Those were the two parcels that make up most of Canyon Lake today.

Construction started in 1927 to build a dam across the river to store water. It was finished in 1929. Railroad Canyon Reservoir, when built, was one of the largest freshwater lakes for fishing, hunting, and camping in Southern California. The reservoir and the surrounding area were leased as a concession from Temescal Water Company as a recreational area under the operation of the George D. Evans family from 1937 until after World War II. After the war Ray and Alpha Schekel, along with John and Darleen Kirkland, operated the resort until 1949 when the lake was drained for repairs to the floodgates.

=== Community development ===
In 1968 the Corona Land Development Company developed the new community.

Canyon Lake began as a master-planned community developed by Corona Land Company in 1968, consisting of 4,801 lots.

== Boundary change ==
In 2011, the Riverside Local Agency Formation Commission (LAFCO) initiated a minor reorganization of the city's borders under LAFCO 2011–13–3. The proposal approved a Sphere of Influence amendment that detached a portion of land near the intersection of Goetz Road and Railroad Canyon Road from the City of Canyon Lake, officially annexing the territory into the neighboring City of Menifee.

== Geography ==
The city of Canyon Lake is located east of Lake Elsinore and west of Menifee, in the southern foothills of the Temescal Mountains. The mountain range is on the western edge of the Perris Block and east of the Elsinore Fault Zone.

According to the United States Census Bureau, the city has a total area of 4.7 square miles (12 km^{2}) or 2,017 acres (816 ha), of which 3.9 square miles (10 km^{2}) is land and 0.7 square miles (1.8 km^{2}) (15.92%) is water. The lake has 14.9 miles (24.0 km) of shoreline.

=== Reservoir ===
The community is named for Canyon Lake reservoir, also known as the Railroad Canyon Reservoir, which it surrounds. The reservoir, created in 1928 with the construction of the Railroad Canyon Dam, covers approximately 525 acres (212 ha), has 14.9 miles (24.0 km) of shoreline, and has a storage capacity of 11,586 acre⋅ft (14,291,000 m^{3}). It is owned and operated by the Elsinore Valley Municipal Water District.

The reservoir is supplied by stormwater runoff from the San Jacinto River and Salt Creek. Water from the reservoir feeds the Canyon Lake Water Treatment Plant, which provides approximately 10% of the domestic water supply in the Lake Elsinore/Canyon Lake area.

== Demographics ==
=== Racial and ethnic composition ===
Demographic profile	2020	2010	2000	1990	1980
White	79.4%	89.9%	92.9%	95.8%	98.5%
—Non-Hispanic	74.7%	81.7%	87.2%	91.6%	95.5%
Black or African American	1.8%	1.2%	0.7%	1.3%	0.1%
Hispanic or Latino (of any race)	15.1%	12.3%	8.5%	5.6%	3.4%
Asian	2.4%	1.7%	1.5%	1.1%	-
Native American	0.4%	0.4%	0.3%	0.4%	-

Historical population
Census	Pop.	Note	%±
1980	2,039		—
1990	7,938		289.3%
2000	9,952		25.4%
2010	10,561		6.1%
2020	11,082		4.9%
2024 (est.)	11,161	▲	0.7%
U.S. Decennial Census

=== 2020 census ===
As of the 2020 census, Canyon Lake had a population of 11,082. The median age was 45.3 years. 20.5% of residents were under the age of 18 and 20.9% of residents were 65 years of age or older. For every 100 females there were 97.0 males, and for every 100 females age 18 and over there were 95.8 males age 18 and over.

99.9% of residents lived in urban areas, while 0.1% lived in rural areas.

There were 4,174 households in Canyon Lake, of which 31.6% had children under the age of 18 living in them. Of all households, 59.6% were married-couple households, 14.4% were households with a male householder and no spouse or partner present, and 19.3% were households with a female householder and no spouse or partner present. About 17.7% of all households were made up of individuals and 9.3% had someone living alone who was 65 years of age or older.

There were 4,568 housing units, of which 8.6% were vacant. The homeowner vacancy rate was 2.2% and the rental vacancy rate was 4.3%.

=== Income and poverty ===
The 2020 census listed median income in Canyon Lake at $120,118 with 6.4% of residents living below the poverty line.

=== 2010 census ===
The 2010 United States census reported that Canyon Lake had a population of 10,561. The population density was 2,260.8 inhabitants per square mile (872.9/km^{2}). The racial makeup of Canyon Lake was 9,495 (89.9%) White (81.7% Non-Hispanic White), 128 (1.2%) Black or African American, 61 (0.6%) Native American, 190 (1.8%) Asian American, 36 (0.3%) Pacific Islander, 316 (3.0%) from other races, and 335 (3.2%) from two or more races. Hispanic or Latino of any race were 1,303 persons (12.3%).

The Census reported that 10,552 people (99.9% of the population) lived in households, 9 (0.1%) lived in non-institutionalized group quarters, and 0 (0%) were institutionalized.

There were 3,935 households, out of which 1,298 (33.0%) had children under the age of 18 living in them, 2,510 (63.8%) were opposite-sex married couples living together, 341 (8.7%) had a female householder with no husband present, 202 (5.1%) had a male householder with no wife present. There were 214 (5.4%) unmarried opposite-sex partnerships, and 27 (0.7%) same-sex married couples or partnerships. 658 households (16.7%) were made up of individuals, and 311 (7.9%) had someone living alone who was 65 years of age or older. The average household size was 2.68. There were 3,053 families (77.6% of all households); the average family size was 2.99.

The population was spread out, with 2,287 people (21.7%) under the age of 18, 835 people (7.9%) aged 18 to 24, 2,304 people (21.8%) aged 25 to 44, 3,332 people (31.6%) aged 45 to 64, and 1,803 people (17.1%) who were 65 years of age or older. The median age was 44.0 years. For every 100 females, there were 99.5 males. For every 100 females age 18 and over, there were 97.0 males.

There were 4,532 housing units at an average density of 970.2 per square mile (374.6/km^{2}), of which 3,245 (82.5%) were owner-occupied, and 690 (17.5%) were occupied by renters. The homeowner vacancy rate was 2.9%; the rental vacancy rate was 6.1%. 8,443 people (79.9% of the population) lived in owner-occupied housing units and 2,109 people (20.0%) lived in rental housing units.

According to the 2010 United States Census, Canyon Lake had a median household income of $74,133, with 5.4% of the population living below the federal poverty line.

=== 2000 census ===
As of the census of 2000, there were 9,952 people, 3,643 households, and 2,939 families residing in this city. The population density was 2,485.9 inhabitants per square mile (959.8/km^{2}). There were 4,047 housing units at an average density of 1,010.9 per square mile (390.3/km^{2}). The racial makeup of the city was 92.9% White (87.9% Non-Hispanic White), 0.8% Black or African American, 0.4% Native American, 1.5% Asian, 0.1% Pacific Islander, 1.8% from other races, and 2.4% from two or more races. 8.5% of the population were Hispanic or Latino of any race.

There were 3,643 households, out of which 34.9% had children under the age of 18 living with them, 70.5% were married couples living together, 6.7% had a female householder with no husband present, and 19.3% were non-families. 14.3% of all households were made up of individuals, and 6.8% had someone living alone who was 65 years of age or older. The average household size was 2.73 and the average family size was 3.00.

In the city, the population was spread out, with 25.9% under the age of 18, 5.2% from 18 to 24, 26.9% from 25 to 44, 25.1% from 45 to 64, and 16.9% who were 65 years of age or older. The median age was 41 years. For every 100 females, there were 96.4 males. For every 100 females age 18 and over, there were 98.1 males.

The median income for a household in the city was $70,106, and the median income for a family was $72,317. Males had a median income of $57,413 versus $36,016 for females. The per capita income for the city was $29,646. About 3.0% of families and 4.9% of the population were below the poverty line, including 7.3% of those under age 18 and 1.9% of those age 65 or over.

=== Crime ===
In 2005, there were 12 violent crimes and 136 property crimes reported; in 2006, 18 and 165, in 2007, 23 and 170, in 2008, 6 and 167, in 2009, 12 and 132, in 2010, 10 and 223. Per capita, these are below the national average.

In 1994, serial killer Dana Sue Gray murdered two of her fellow Canyon Lake residents, targeting elderly women who lived alone. Gray also killed an elderly woman in nearby Lake Elsinore and attempted to kill another woman. She robbed all her victims of their cash and credit cards.

== Government ==
The City of Canyon Lake was incorporated on December 1, 1990. The elected body of government is the five member city council that is elected at large by the voters of the city.

In the state legislature, Canyon Lake is in the 32nd senatorial district, represented by Republican Kelly Seyarto, and in the 63rd Assembly district, represented by Republican Natasha Johnson.

In the United States House of Representatives, Canyon Lake is in California's 41st congressional district, represented by Republican Ken Calvert.

== Politics ==
Since its incorporation, all nine Republican gubernatorial candidates, all nine Republican presidential candidates, and all nine Republican senatorial candidates who qualified for the general election ballot carried Canyon Lake by a margin of at least 23 points, with Donald Trump in 2016, 2020, and 2024 as well as George W. Bush in 2000, and 2004 each carrying the city by a margin of over 50 points. Canyon Lake is also one of the few cities in California where Donald Trump received a greater percentage of the vote in 2016 than Mitt Romney did in 2012, as well as one of the few in the state where he received a larger percentage of the vote for re-election (in which he lost to Joe Biden) in 2020.

As of October 21, 2024, there were 8,339 registered voters in Canyon Lake. Of these voters, 5,202 (62.38%) are registered Republicans, 1,348 (16.17%) are registered Democrats, 1,127 (13.51%) are not affiliated with a political party, and 662 (7.94%) are registered with a third party. Among third parties, the American Independent party had the most registered voters with 427 (5.12%).

Canyon Lake has the highest percentage of registered Republicans in the counties of Los Angeles, Riverside, San Bernardino, Orange, San Diego, Kern, San Luis Obispo, Ventura, or Imperial as of September 6, 2024

Listed below are all presidential, gubernatorial, and senate results for Canyon Lake since its incorporation:

Canyon Lake city vote by party in presidential elections
Year	Democratic	Republican	Third Parties
2024	21.35% 1,469	**77.30%** 5,319	1.35% 93
2020	23.54% 1,655	**75.34%** 5,298	1.12% 79
2016	21.68% 1,175	**74.76%** 4,052	3.56% 193
2012	25.32% 1,236	**72.88%** 3,558	1.80% 88
2008	30.25% 1,574	**68.64%** 3,572	1.11% 58
2004	24.55% 1,264	**74.78%** 3,850	0.66% 34
2000	19.63% 782	**77.98%** 3,106	2.39% 95
1996	27.71% 1,383	**61.44%** 2,468	10.85% 436
1992	23.49% 958	**50.11%** 2,044	26.40% 1,077

Canyon Lake city vote by party in gubernatorial elections
Year	Democratic	Republican	Third Parties
2022	20.66% 1,038	**79.34%** 3,986
2021 (Note: The totals listed for the 2021 governor's special election are the aggregate totals for all Republican candidates, all Democratic candidates, and all Independent candidates. Individually, Larry Elder received 3,934 votes, Kevin Faulconer received 266 votes, John Cox received 167 votes, and Kevin Paffrath received 127 votes.)	6.22% 314	**92.50%** 4,673	1.29% 65
2018	23.44% 1,139	**76.56%** 3,720
2014	25.32% 1,236	**71.98%** 2,181
2010	24.71% 1,000	**69.90%** 2,829	5.39% 218
2006	15.36% 550	**81.76%** 2,927	2.88% 103
2003 (Note: The totals listed for the 2003 governor's special election are the aggregate totals for all Republican candidates, all Democratic candidates, and all Independent candidates. Individually, Arnold Schwarzenegger received 3,128 votes, Cruz Bustamante received 385 votes, and Tom McClintock received 497 votes.)	9.54% 396	**89.13%** 3,638	1.33% 55
2002	25.17% 799	**70.10%** 2,225	4.73% 150
1998	37.24% 1,280	**61.04%** 2,098	1.72% 59
1994	11.63% 384	**85.32%** 2,818	3.06% 101

Canyon Lake city vote by party in senate elections
Year	Democratic	Republican	Third Parties
2018	42.62% 1,588 | **57.38%** 2,138 (Note: In the 2018, and 2016 US senate elections, no Republican candidates qualified for the ballot, the bolded totals are of the winning candidates, Kevin DeLeon, and Kamala Harris respectively.)
2016	46.62% 1,800 | **53.38%** 2,061
2012	28.21% 1,320	**71.79%** 3,359
2010	21.65% 873	**74.26%** 2,994	4.09% 165
2006	32.01% 1,119	**64.47%** 2,254	3.52% 123
2004	31.59% 1,595	**64.86%** 3,275	3.55% 179
2000	33.49% 1,478	**62.16%** 2,743	4.06% 179
1998	32.93% 1,092	**64.48%** 2,138	2.59% 86
1994	20.54% 713	**71.94%** 2,497	7.52% 261
1992	22.59% 901	**69.82%** 2,785	7.60% 303
1992	30.62% 1,222	**61.29%** 2,446	8.09% 323

In addition to the GOP dominating its registration, and elections, Canyon Lake has also displayed a socially conservative bent on California state ballot propositions in recent years. In 2000, California's Proposition 22 which was a state constitutional amendment that banned same-sex marriage received 2,603 votes in Canyon Lake (78.90%) and was opposed by 696 voters (21.10%). Similarly, in 2008, California's Proposition 8 a similar measure that also banned same-sex marriage in California, received 3,609 votes (69.29%) in Canyon Lake and was opposed by 1,599 voters (30.71%). Also in 2008, California's Proposition 4 which would have required parental notification before a minor received an abortion received 3,003 votes in favor (59.11%) and 2,077 votes against (40.89%) in Canyon Lake.

In 1994, California's Proposition 187, which set up a state screening service for undocumented immigrants passed in Canyon Lake with 2,905 votes (82.05%) vs 615 votes against (17.95%). This was much higher than the 58% of the vote the measure passed by statewide.

In the 2003 California gubernatorial recall election, 82.53% of all votes cast were in support of the recall of Gray Davis. Similarly, in the 2021 California gubernatorial recall election, 79.37% of all votes cast were in support of the recall of Gavin Newsom."Riverside 2021 Recall Election" (PDF). Riverside, California. September 14, 2021. Archived from the original (PDF) on March 10, 2022.

== Infrastructure ==
=== Education ===
There are no public schools in Canyon Lake.

K-12 students who live in Canyon Lake attend schools operated by the Lake Elsinore Unified School District (LEUSD).

=== Public library ===
The Riverside County Library System (RCLS) operates a library branch in Canyon Lake. Previously located inside the city hall, the Canyon Lake Library opened in a larger standalone location in August 2021.

=== Sanitation ===
Sanitation in the City of Canyon Lake is contracted to CR&R

== Public Safety ==
In recent years, specialized code enforcement officers have also maintained patrols of the approximately 20-acre (8.1 ha) parcel of land administered by the Bureau of Land Management which encompasses the eastern shore of the lake in its upper reaches. The trail running north along the eastern shore of the lake has become an inviting activity for hikers and birdwatchers, particularly in the winter months when the hills are green and temperatures lower. Canyon Lake forbids all public use of any "two-wheeled motorized vehicle" (that is, all motorcycles, mopeds, and dirt bikes) on all private streets throughout the CLPOA, but excluding the two public roads (Railroad Canyon and Goetz Roads).

In 2021, the Riverside County Municipal Service review stated that City of Canyon Lake has had trouble making reimbursement payments to the City of Lake Elsinore for services provided under the mutual aid agreements.

In 2024, Canyon Lake residents initiated a tax measure to increase revenue to cover rising costs for public safety under Measure Z. it was expected to generate 855,000 in annual local funding for public safety services.

=== Police Department ===
In 2025, the city of Canyon lake decided to pursue the establishment of its own police department due to unsustainable rising costs with the sheriffs department. The city expects to save $90,000 a year by combining code compliance with its own police department. Canyon Lake Police Department officially begins operations on August 10, 2026 Dispatching for its new police department is contracted out to the city of Hemet

=== Fire Department ===
In 2014, Canyon Lake residents passed Measure DD, a 4 percent utility tax to fund the fire department In 2015, Canyon Lakes own only fire station was shut down due to the lack of payment.

In June 2019, City of Canyon Lake started the to reduce staffing levels at the Canyon Lake Fire station to 3 staff members per shift due to the rising cost of the Cal Fire contract due to an unpaid services bill of 2 million dollars. In November 2020, they city of canyon lake decided to terminate its contract with Cal Fire due to rising costs.

In January 2022, the city of canyon lake officially launched its own fire department

Canyon lakes budgeting problems did not end with the launch of its own fire department, in June 2026, Cal fire Union local 2881 accused the city of Ongoing operations concerns about the minimum staffing requirement, employee retention, and Insurance services office rating

=== Animal Control ===
Animal Control services within Canyon Lake are contracted to Animal Friends of the Valleys

=== Private Security ===
All gates are staffed 24 hours a day by a community patrol contracted by US Security Associates. Access is granted to outsiders by sponsorship from a property owner or renter who calls in their guests to a 24-hour answer line.

=== Transportation ===
Canyon Lake is located approximately 3 miles (4.8 km) east of Interstate 15 and 5 miles (8.0 km) west of Interstate 215. Railroad Canyon Road is the main public road in Canyon Lake, providing direct access to the neighboring cities of Lake Elsinore and Menifee. Goetz Road connects the eastern portion of Canyon Lake to the community of Quail Valley and the city of Perris.

== In popular culture ==
In 2006, the community was the subject of United Gates of America, a BBC television documentary directed by Alex Cooke, featuring journalist Charlie LeDuff. He lived in the community for a month to explore why people wanted to live behind gates and fences, and what effect it had on the residents. LeDuff also explored the issues of immigration from Mexico and Central America, and highlighted the issues of segregation and racism that exist in the United States. The film was the subject of some controversy within the community, but received positive reviews in the UK and other parts of the US.
