= Francisco Cantú =

American writer

Francisco Cantú is an American author, agent and translator. He served as agent of United States Border Patrol between 2008 and 2012.

== Awards ==
- Whiting Awards in Non-fiction in 2017
- Los Angeles Times Book Prize for Current Interest in 2018
- Finalist for National Book Critics Circle Award for Nonfiction in 2018

== Bibliography ==
- Cantú, Francisco (2018). The line becomes a river : dispatches from the border. New York: Riverhead Books. ISBN 9780735217713.
