= Confucius Lives Next Door =

1999 book by T.R. Reid

First edition (publ. Random House)

Confucius Lives Next Door: What Living in the East Teaches Us About Living in the West is a 1999 book by Washington Post writer T.R. Reid.

== The book's argument ==
Reid, a sometime commentator for National Public Radio, lived with his wife, son, and two daughters in Japan for five years as Tokyo bureau chief for the Washington Post. This book draws on his experiences during that time. He argues that the Asian Dragon economies have built modern industrial societies featuring the safest streets, the best schools, and the most stable families in the world. Reid credits this success to the ethical values of Chinese philosopher Confucius, who taught the value of ren (harmony) and the Ethic of Reciprocity.

Upon arriving, he reported, he and his family found themselves "smack in the middle of a fundamental shift in world history—a basic realignment of global stature and political power.... we found ourselves in the Asian century." They found that Asian societies dealt more successfully with issues of crime, drug use, family, education, and equality of wealth.

== Reception ==
The reviews welcomed the book but carried on a discussion of the issues behind it. Kirkus Reviews found it a "readable if superficial analysis of the moral basis of east Asian society." In the Washington Post, China scholar Judith Shapiro drew on her own experience living in China to discuss Reid's emphasis on social values over individualism. Frank Gibney, a long-time Japan Hand, lauded Reid for focusing on Confucian values, but thought his view too rosy: Japan is a land where "conformity is inbred -- no need to be enforced -- and where the ethics of social relationships become a binding morality from which there is almost no escape." The Japanese electorate, Gibney held, "sold its collective soul to a corrupt, faction-ridden political party, backed by a decadent father-knows-best bureaucracy that has yet to grasp the virtues of real free enterprise." Another reviewer wrote that the "so-called social miracle is a glossy caricature—psychologically, culturally, and statistically—of the very people he hopes to defend." It would be nice to think, he continued, that Japanese society "thrives on an immutable culture built on loyalty, civility, and the value of a stable, hardworking community." But Reid neglects political structure and historical situation; the Japan that he saw was produced by war, the American Occupation, and postwar consensus building, not Confucius.
