= Ruby Jean Johnson =

- Born: Ruby Jean Muckelroy; November 16, 1916; Chattanooga, Oklahoma
- Died: June 26, 1998 (aged 81); Harlem
- Cause of death: Murder
- Known for: Model, hostess, and socialite
- Spouse: Walter Johnson (married 1953-1977)
- Partner: Jimmy Monroe

Ruby Jean Johnson (November 16, 1916 – June 26, 1998) was a model, hostess, and socialite. Johnson was a "'glittering personality' of the Harlem Renaissance." Johnson worked as a hostess at the Savoy Ballroom and was the first Black woman to model for New York fashion magazines. In 1998, she was murdered by her neighbor.

== Biography ==
Ruby Jean Muckelroy was born on November 16, 1916, in Chattanooga, Oklahoma. When she was young, her father left her family and her mother put her in an orphanage. She lived at the orphanage for eight years and then moved to New Rochelle to live with her grandmother. In the early 1950s, she moved to Greenwich Village from New Rochelle. In the 1930s, she worked as a dance hostess in the Savoy ballroom. Around 1937, she met a German artist, and modeled for him as he "taught her how to be beautiful, how to speak, how to be powerful." Their relationship lasted through World War II. Johnson worked as a model at this time.

In 1952, Johnson became further acquainted with Walter Johnson, a jazz drummer she had met early in her time in New York City. Although oral accounts recall them marrying in 1953, there is not a civil record; they likely did not legally marry due to Johnson's marriage to his first wife. After Walter Johnson died in 1977, his first wife staked a claim on his estate, leaving Johnson bereft.

She later found a romantic companion in Jimmy Monroe, Billie Holiday's widower.

Johnson later worked as a home-care attendant. As her neighborhood changed, she refused to move away, despite having a stray bullet shatter her mirror and having her apartment repeatedly robbed.

== Death ==
On June 26, Johnson was found in her bathtub raped and strangled. Two days after her death, Rudy Giuliani offered a $10,000 award for information leading to her killer. A few days after her death, her former neighbor, Elbert Mitchell, was seen trying to sell her videocassette recorder and her jewelry. He was later arrested due to DNA evidence and Mitchell claimed that he had been having an affair with Johnson, which her friends did not believe. Mitchell was found guilty of first-degree murder and sentenced to life in prison without a possibility of parole.

The judge sentenced Mitchell as a persistent felony offender to another 25 years in prison for a burglary charge.

Johnson's murder was covered by Charlie LeDuff. His profile on her was cited when he won the 1999 Columbia Journalism Award.
