= The Michigan Citizen =

Defunct newspaper in Detroit, Michigan

- Type: Weekly newspaper
- Format: Broadsheet
- Publisher: Catherine Kelly
- Founded: 1978
- Ceased publication: 2014
- Language: English
- Headquarters: 1055 Trumbull; Detroit, MI 48216; United States
- Circulation: 56,000
- Website: michigancitizen.com

The Michigan Citizen (sometimes called just Michigan Citizen) was a weekly newspaper distributed in Detroit. The Michigan Citizen has been published on Sundays since November 1978. Charles D. Kelly (1932-2006) was the newspaper's founding publisher. The Michigan Citizen was a publication for Michigan's African-American and progressive-minded community.

Charles and his wife, Teresa, founded The Michigan Citizen newspaper on their dining-room table in Benton Harbor, Michigan, in November 1978. He grew the paper from a 12-page tabloid with an original circulation of 3000 distributed in the Benton Harbor area to a 16-page broadsheet with a statewide circulation of 56,000.

He opened a Detroit-area office of the paper in 1985. The Michigan Citizen was the official newspaper for the city of Highland Park, Michigan. Since its beginning, the paper has maintained a strong pro-community, progressive editorial stance.

The Michigan Citizen ceased operations in 2014, publishing its last weekly edition on December 28, 2014.
