= The New Chinese Empire =

2003 book by Ross Terrill

The New Chinese Empire is a book by Ross Terrill, published by Basic Books in 2003. The book won the Los Angeles Times Book Prize for Current Interest.

The book goes into in-depth explanations about the new and powerful Chinese "empire" and how it affects American society and ideology. It also delves deeply into the psyche of the Chinese government's internal workings and explains China's view on domestic and foreign policies.

== Reviews ==
Kirkus Reviews describes the book as a "provocative analysis of Asian affairs and world politics." Terrill characterizes China as "a civilization pretending to be a nation," highlighting the tension between China's imperial legacy and its modern aspirations. The review says that while China has made economic strides, its political system remains authoritarian.

A review in China Perspectives emphasizes Terrill's view that China has maintained an "imperial-Leninist" regime, which is increasingly incompatible with its rapidly modernizing society. The review discusses Terrill's analysis of China's historical evolution, its current political structure, and the challenges it faces, including demographic issues and the need for political reform.
