= Ordinary Notes =

2023 book by Christina Sharpe

- First edition
- Author: Christina Sharpe
- Language: English
- Genre: Essay; criticism
- Publisher: Farrar, Straus and Giroux
- Publication date: April 25, 2023
- Publication place: United States
- Media type: Print (hardcover and paperback); digital; audiobook
- Pages: 392
- ISBN: 978-0374604486
- OCLC: 1376023460

Ordinary Notes is a book by American academic Christina Sharpe, published in April 2023 by Farrar, Straus and Giroux. The book is a collection of 248 notes about black life in the United States.

Ordinary Notes received positive reviews by writers for Kirkus Reviews, The New York Times, and others. It was shortlisted for the 2023 National Book Award for Nonfiction. Sharpe previously published In the Wake: On Blackness and Being in 2016.

== Contents ==
Among its 248 notes are recollections of the presidency of Barack Obama, a discussion of Obama's response to the 2015 Charleston church shooting, an anecdote at the National Memorial for Peace and Justice, a discussion of Roland Barthes's book Camera Lucida, and an analysis of a character in Toni Morrison's Beloved.

== Reception ==
Ordinary Notes received a positive review by Brendan Buck in Newcity, who praised Sharpe's writing as "not just personal or academic" but using an "inventive form" to discuss personal, academic, historical, and other facets of black identity. Kirkus Reviews praised Sharpe's writing as "exquisitely original" and "artistry", while Jennifer Szalai, writing for The New York Times views her collection of notes "as a rejoinder" to popular conceptions to black life. A review by CBC Books labeled the book "a singular achievement" in writing about "the ordinary-extraordinary dimensions of Black life".

Kirkus Reviews named Ordinary Notes one of the best non-fiction books of 2023.
