= Karla Cornejo Villavicencio =

Ecuadorian-American writer

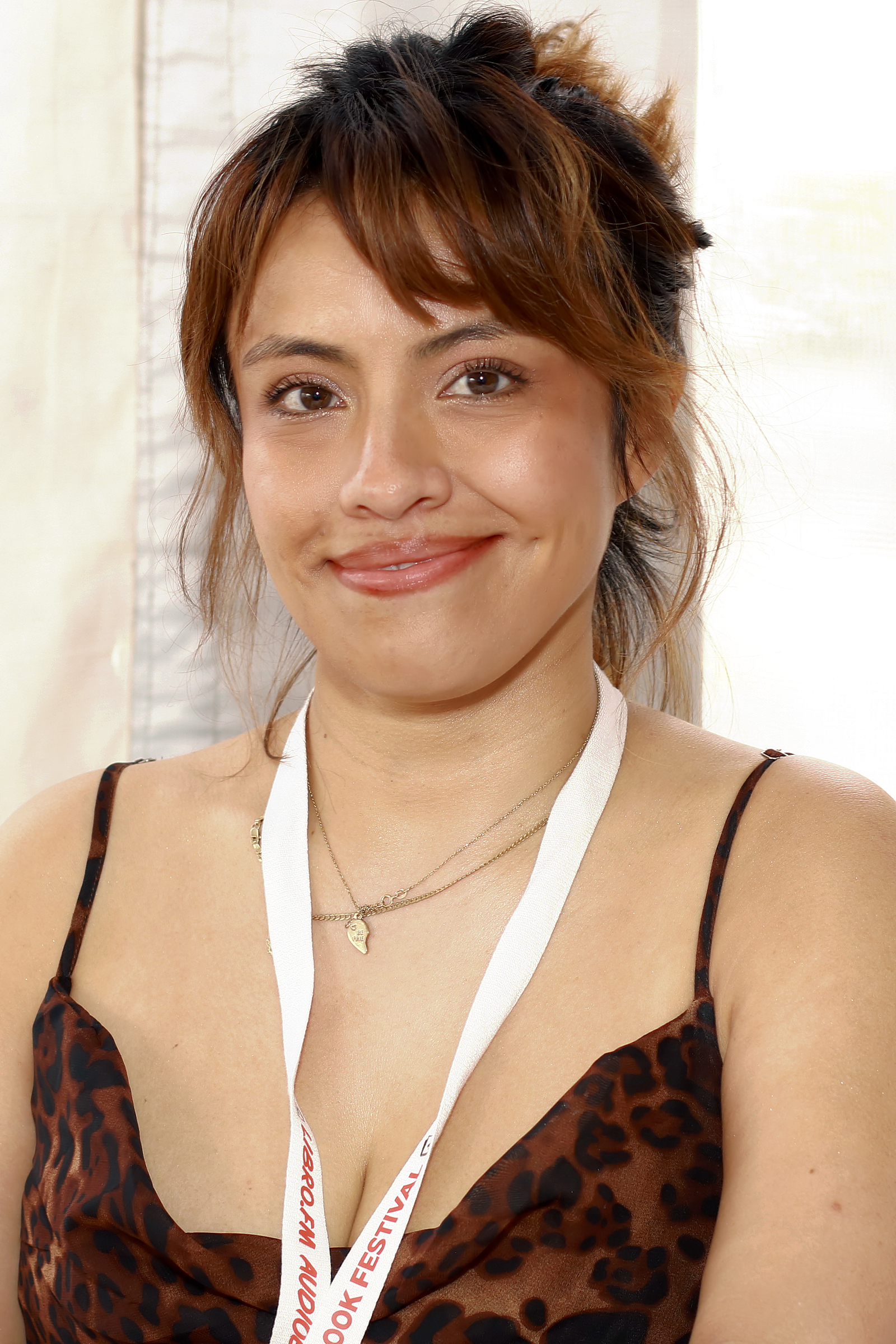
- Cornejo Villavicencio at the 2024 Texas Book Festival.
- Born: 1989 (age 36–37); Ecuador
- Occupations: Non-fiction writer; journalist
- Writing career
- Period: 2020–present
- Subject: Immigration
- Notable work: The Undocumented Americans

Karla Cornejo Villavicencio (born 1989) is an Ecuadorian-American writer and the author of The Undocumented Americans (2021) and Catalina (2024). She has written about her experiences as an undocumented immigrant from Ecuador to the United States. In October 2020 it was shortlisted for the National Book Award for Nonfiction. Her 2024 novel Catalina was longlisted for the National Book Award for Fiction. Her book The Undocumented Americans was a finalist for the New York Times notable book in 2020.

== Early life and education ==
Karla Cornejo Villavicencio was born in 1989 in Ecuador. When she was 18 months old, her parents left her behind when they immigrated to the US. When she was four or five, her parents brought her to the United States. She has a brother. Her family lived in the New York borough of Queens. After 9/11, Cornejo Villavicencio's father, who had been working as a taxi driver, lost his license.

Her academic excellence prompted a wealthy benefactor to pay for her tuition at a Catholic school in New York. She graduated from Harvard in 2011 and believes she is one of the first undocumented immigrants to do so. As of September 2020 she was a PhD candidate in the American studies program at Yale. Before choosing Yale University to pursue her PhD, Cornejo Villavicencio experienced difficulties due to her undocumented status since universities such as Stanford and UPenn pulled their offers upon discovering her status. She was an Emerson Collective fellow.

== Career ==
As early as the age of fifteen, Cornejo Villavicencio began writing professionally about jazz for a downtown NYC jazz publication. Though Cornejo Villavicencio did not know where she wanted her career to go at first, she later discovered her passion in advocating for issues regarding immigration, mental illness, and the culture of people who are undocumented. Cornejo Villavicencio began writing professionally as a teenager. She reviewed jazz albums for a New York monthly magazine. She has written for The Atlantic, Elle, Glamour, n+1, The New Republic, The New York Times, and Vogue. In April 2021, she published her memoir The Undocumented Americans and in July 2024 she published her debut novel, Catalina.

=== The Undocumented Americans ===
In 2010, when Cornejo Villavicencio was a senior in college and before Deferred Action for Childhood Arrivals (DACA) program was established, she wrote an essay, “I'm an Illegal Immigrant at Harvard”, which was published anonymously by the Daily Beast. Literary agents reached out to ask if she'd be interested in writing a memoir, which she says made her angry, as she was at the time 21. She felt most were interested in having her write "a rueful tale about a sickly Victorian orphan with tuberculosis who didn't have a social security number".

Cornejo Villavicencio's first book, The Undocumented Americans, is part memoir, part essays about undocumented day laborers, whom she calls "People who don't inspire hashtags or t-shirts". She started writing it the morning after the 2016 presidential election and says she "thought the moment called for a radical experiment in genre". Cornejo Villavicencio tells her own immigration story and profiles undocumented immigrants across the United States, detailing the trauma of those recruited to clean up ground zero, the loneliness of day laborers in Staten Island, the struggle that many faced with the water crisis in Flint, Michigan etc. She has said she wasn't interested in writing about DACA recipients, as the stories of DACA recipients are already well-documented and "occupy outsize attention in our politics". Cornejo Villavicencio is critical of reportage done by the media in terms of undocumented people, where journalism praises the accomplishments of DREAMers while casting the rest of the undocumented population as villains or oversimplifying their stories. Cornejo Villavicencio's memoir is intended for “ immigrants of all backgrounds”, providing a place for all immigrants to be heard and seen. The memoir serves as a piece designed to clear up misconceptions surrounding the undocumented community, and may serve as a reflective work for those who have legal status. Cornejo only used interviews in which she established a more personal connection with the person rather than using every story she came across which makes it more genuine. Cornejo Villavicencio's memoir is one of the few works written by undocumented or formerly undocumented writers within the last five years. Other notable writers in this category include Jose Antonio Vargas, Julissa Arce, and Javier Zamora. Jose Antonio Vargas described Cornejo Villavicencio's memoir as ‘a significant contribution to personal-essay literary journalism,' emphasizing its role in illuminating and giving voice to the lives of undocumented individuals in the United States. Cornejo Villavicencio visited with workers in Cleveland, Flint, New Haven, New York, and Miami, "gaining access to vigilantly guarded communities whose stories are largely absent from modern journalism and literature". She in general avoided detailing her subjects' reasons for emigrating because she believes people shouldn't have to provide a reason why they "deserve" to emigrate.

Cornejo Villavicencio built trust slowly within the communities of undocumented immigrants, helped by her own undocumented status and her fluency in Spanish, taking notes by hand instead of relying on a tape recorder. She developed close relationships with the interviewees, offering emotional support, resources, educational assistance, and advocacy. In her work, she explores themes like immigration, spirituality, and identity. Cornejo also addresses the impact of immigration, deportation and undocumented life on mental health, particularly among young individuals. Cornejo Villavicencio wrote The Undocumented Americans intending to depict undocumented immigrants as more than the one-dimensional caricatures accepted by society. She wanted to shift focus from adolescent immigrants to older ones who tend to be treated as unambitious because of their job titles such as domestic workers or day laborers. Cornejo Villavicencio gives voice to undocumented people who are parents, grandparents, and breadwinners for their families. These are people who she feels voices are silenced and whose struggles are ignored by society. She shares personal stories, such as witnessing her father collapse and sob on the floor after losing his job, highlighting the harsh reality faced by many migrant children. Cornejo Villavicencio considers herself an essayist and when describing The Undocumented Americans she believes it is a work of non-fiction influenced by creative ethnographies and testimonials, being a Latin American genre. After the book was completed she destroyed her notes. She changed the names and any personal details that could be used to identify the subjects. The book is dedicated to Claudia Gomez Gonzalez, an undocumented immigrant who was killed by border agents shortly after crossing the Mexican border. Gonzalez's story resonated deeply with Cornejo, as Gonzalez was killed due to her desire to achieve unfulfilled dreams in a country known as the land of opportunity and growth. Cornejo Villavicencio, who considers herself "a good poster child for those opportunities," wishes she "could have protected her."

Shereen Marisol Meraji says the book "profiles people who've paid a steep price for the so-called American Dream". Cornejo Villavicencio had originally written the book as her dissertation at Yale; when she presented it, it was failed, she believes because she "criticized the legacy of migration studies, where I found a fixation on brown skin, on calloused hands". She places the book in the Latin American literary genre testimonio.

Natasha Walter describes the memoir as having a reportage style, as Cornejo Villavicencio details the immense role that day laborers played at Ground Zero in the aftermath of 9/11 and the lives of undocumented people throughout cities in the United States. Working at Ground Zero, these workers endured poor conditions, being exposed to toxic dust and debris without proper equipment and receiving inadequate pay. As a result, a large percentage of the day laborers developed various health conditions, as chronicled in Cornejo Villavicencio's memoir. Day laborers were also major contributors to the restoration efforts of hurricane-struck Staten Island, working as unpaid volunteers following Hurricane Sandy. In Miami, Cornejo Villavicencio reflects on the health crisis faced by undocumented people in the United States by providing personal narratives of the undocumented, rather than relying on statistics. She recounts the reliance of the undocumented community on alternative healthcare, including attending botanicas to attain medicinal herbs or resorting to Vodou or Santeria to cure ailments. While in Flint - known for the Flint water crisis- Cornejo Villavicencio was struck by the fact that the group of children she observed from a distance were not interested in higher education. This was a moment of reflection for her, as she realized that these children were "not only victims of the polluted water crisis, but also casualties of social forces that will never let them succeed."

In 2020 during the coronavirus pandemic, she wrote a piece for The New York Times about the humanitarian crisis on the US–Mexico border.

==== Reception ====
Remezcla called The Undocumented Americans a "creative non-fiction masterpiece". The Adroit Journal called her writing style "very precise and also casual, almost nonchalant". Guernica said "Her prose—caustic, quick, and simmering with righteous anger—leads seamlessly from heartbreak to gut-splitting laughter". Bookforum said "The book is beautiful for Cornejo Villavicencio's sensitivity to character, and for her ability to structure a narrative almost entirely through the people she meets." Caitlin Dickerson, writing for The New York Times, called the book "captivating and evocative". Publishers Weekly called it "profoundly intimate" and an "incandescent account". Kirkus Reviews points out that because any identifiable details have been changed, the reader has to trust that Cornejo Villavicencio hasn't embellished, but notes her "candor about herself removes worries about the credibility of her stories". The Harvard Crimson said that her point is that "Undocumented people need not be 'heroes' for their stories to be important, valid, and, above all, told." Daisy Muñoz, writing for the LatinX Project at New York University, said "Cornejo’s storytelling flawlessly goes from her experiences to those of her interviewees, all the while weaving everyone’s histories into a compassionate and nuanced narrative of what it means to live an undocumented life". ElectricLiterature said it "doesn't pander to white expectations". The Common called it "heavy and gorgeous and astoundingly humane". Smithsonian gave it a starred review. It has been shortlisted for the 2020 National Book Award for Nonfiction; according to the National Book Foundation she is the first undocumented writer to be a finalist.

Before achieving legal status, Cornejo Villavicencio held a worker's permit as a result of the Deferred Action for Childhood Arrivals program (DACA). As of October 2020, she is no longer an undocumented resident, having gained a green card and establishing permanent residence in New Haven, Connecticut.

== Personal life ==
Karla Cornejo Villavicencio was born in Ecuador in 1989 and brought to the United States to join her parents a few years later. She uses her platform to highlight the complexities and human aspects of immigration, challenging stereotypes and bringing to light the stories of those often marginalized in society. She grew up in Brooklyn and Queens and now lives with her partner and is working towards a Ph.D. in American Studies at Yale University.

== Bibliography ==
- Cornejo Villavicencio, Karla (2020). The undocumented Americans. New York: One World.
