= Andrea Elliott =

American journalist

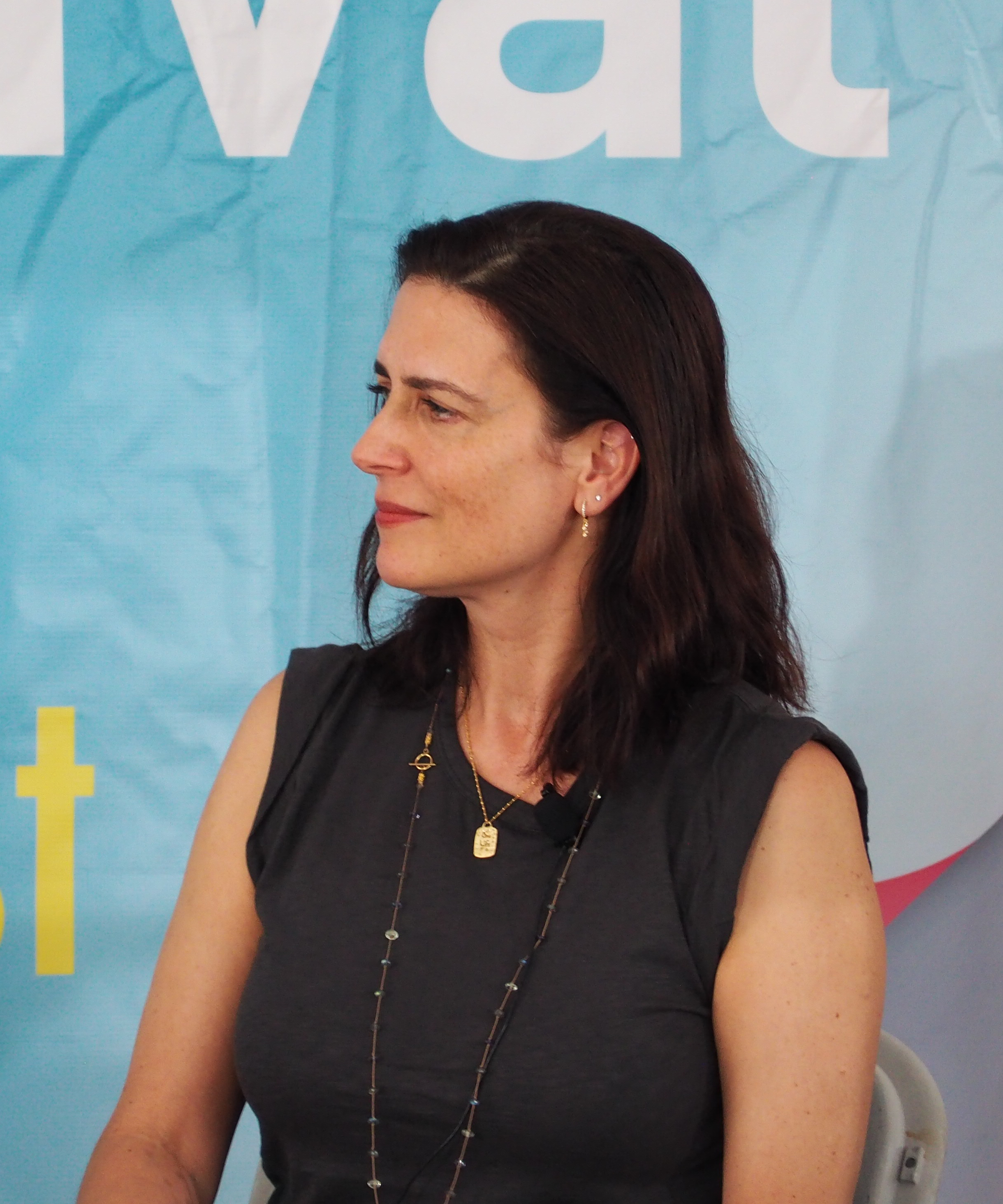
- Elliott in 2023
- Born: Washington, D.C., U.S.
- Education: Occidental College (BA); Columbia University (MS)
- Occupation: Journalist
- Employer: The New York Times
- Notable work: Invisible Child: Poverty, Survival & Hope in an American City
- Website: andrea-elliott.com

Andrea Elliott is an American journalist and a staff writer for The New York Times. She is the first woman to win a Pulitzer Prize in both Journalism (2007) and Letters (2022). She received the 2007 Pulitzer Prize for Feature Writing for a series of articles on an Egyptian-born imam living in Brooklyn and the 2022 Pulitzer Prize for General Nonfiction for Invisible Child: Poverty, Survival & Hope in an American City, a book about Dasani, a young girl enduring homelessness in New York City.

== Early life and education ==
Elliott was born in Washington, D.C. to a Chilean mother and an American father. Growing up, Elliot was close with her older brother Thomas and younger brother Pablo. She studied comparative literature at Occidental College, where she developed an interest in documentary film. In 1995, Elliott worked in Chile and Argentina as a field producer for "La Tierra en que Vivimos," a natural history television program. She then moved to San Francisco to co-direct and write the documentary "It's All Good," exploring the subculture of aggressive inline skaters in Los Angeles and New York City. In 1999, Elliott attended Columbia University's Graduate School of Journalism, graduating first in her class.

== Journalism career ==
Elliott joined The Miami Herald as a reporter in 2000, covering crime, courts, immigration and Latin American politics. She left The Miami Herald for The New York Times in May 2003. As a metro reporter for The Times, she covered the Bronx and then created her own beat – Islam in a post-9/11 America – writing extensively about the backlash against Muslims after the September 11 attacks, domestic radicalization and militant jihad.

In December 2013, Elliott published "Invisible Child," a 28,000-word, five-part series for the Times on child homelessness in New York City. Elliott expanded the series into a book for Random House as an Emerson Fellow at New America Foundation. Invisible Child: Poverty, Survival and Hope in an American City was published in October 2021. It was selected for the New York Times Book Review's "10 Best Books of 2021" list.

== Prizes ==
In 2007, Elliott received the Pulitzer Prize for Feature Writing for a series of articles on Sheik Reda Shata, an Egyptian-born imam living in Brooklyn. Journalist Jonathan S. Tobin criticized the award because Elliott's reporting failed to mention that it was a sermon preached by Mohammed Moussa (a previous Imam in this mosque) whom she portrayed in sympathetic detail that inspired one of the congregants to perpetrate the 1994 Brooklyn Bridge shooting of a bus of Jewish schoolboys, which was a hate crime.

Elliott is also the recipient of the George Polk Award, the Scripps Howard Award, the David Aronson Award and prizes by the Overseas Press Club, the American Society of Newspaper Editors, the Society of Professional Journalists and the New York Press Club. Her work has been featured in the collections Best Newspaper Writing and Islam for Journalists: A Primer on Covering Muslim American Communities in America.

In May 2014, Elliott received an honorary doctorate from Niagara University, which cited her “courage, perseverance, and a commitment to fairness for those without a public voice rarely demonstrated among writers today.”

In May 2015, Elliott was awarded Columbia University's Medal for Excellence, awarded to one alumna under 45 every year.

In 2018, Elliott received a Whiting Creative Nonfiction Grant to complete her book Invisible Child.

In 2022, Elliot received a Pulitzer Prize for General Nonfiction for her book Invisible Child: Poverty, Survival & Hope in an American City.

== Published works ==
- (2021) Invisible Child: Poverty, Survival & Hope in an American City. New York: Random House. ISBN 978-0-8129-8694-5
