= The Healing of America =

Non-fiction book by T. R. Reid

The Healing of America: A Global Quest for Better, Cheaper, and Fairer Health Care
- First edition
- Author: T. R. Reid
- Language: English
- Subject: Health care policy
- Publisher: Penguin Press
- Publication date: August 31, 2010
- Publication place: US
- Media type: paperback
- Pages: 304
- ISBN: 978-0-14-311821-3
- OCLC: 875533650

The Healing of America: A Global Quest for Better, Cheaper, and Fairer Health Care is a New York Times bestseller from journalist T. R. Reid. Reid compares health care systems in a half-a-dozen wealthy nations with the health care models followed in the United States, in a straightforward, easy to read narrative. The countries whose systems are discussed are: France, Germany, Japan, the United Kingdom, Canada and a specific example from India. Reid visited all these countries personally and claims to have chosen them since they exemplify specific kinds of health-care system models. The book also discusses transitions in the health care systems of Taiwan and Switzerland.

The major theme of the book is the contrasting of health care in other developed countries with health care in the United States. Reid is critical of the United States for not being able to provide guaranteed health services to all its citizens as is done in virtually all developed countries. Along with the study of various health systems, Reid also documents his attempts to get treatment for his shoulder during the journey described in the book. Reid finds suitable treatment in India, which has an out-of-pocket model, the only one Reid considers to be worse than the American system of health care.

== Major forms of international health care systems ==
=== The Bismarck Model ===
This is the model followed in Germany and in its rudimentary form was laid out by Otto von Bismarck. The system uses private initiatives to provide the medical services. The insurance coverage is also mainly provided through private companies. However, the insurance companies operate as non-profits and are required to sign up all citizens without any conditions. At the same time all citizens (barring a rich minority in the case of Germany) are required to sign up for one or the other health insurance. The government plays a central role in determining payments for various health services, thus keeping a decent control on cost.

=== The Beveridge Model ===
This model adopted by Britain is closest to socialized medicine, according to the author. Here almost all health-care providers work as government employees and the government acts as the single-payer for all health services. The patients incur no out-of-pocket costs, but the system is under pressure due to rising costs. The author, Reid, was told by a British doctor to live with his shoulder problem. The system would not treat it, and that every other British doctor would tell him the same thing.

=== The National Health Insurance Model ===
The Canadian model has a single-payer system like Britain; however, the health care providers work mostly as private entities. The system keeps costs low and provides health care to all. The major drawback of this system comes from the long waiting times for several procedures. The author, Reid, would have had to wait 18 months for his shoulder treatment in Canada.

=== The Out of Pocket Model ===
This is the kind of model followed in most poor countries. There is no wide public or private system of health insurance. People mostly pay for the services they receive 'out of pocket'. However, this leaves many underprivileged people without essential health care. Almost all countries with such a system have a much lower life expectancy and high infant mortality rates. The author gives his experience with the system in India, and a brief description of the ancient medical system of Ayurveda.

== American Model for Health ==
According to the author the United States follows many of the international systems in bits and pieces, yet he concludes that in the US there is rather a healthcare market than an actual healthcare system.

- For most working people under sixty-five: The model is closest to the Bismarck system adopted by Germany and Japan. However, in America health insurance companies can be for-profit enterprises, unlike in Germany and Japan.
- For Native Americans, military personnel, and veterans: America follows the Beveridge Model of Britain, where the government acts as both the payer and provider.
- For those over sixty-five: The American model here is very close to the Canadian single-payer model. The government ends up acting as the insurer, while the private sector provides the medical services.
- For uninsured Americans: Americans with no health insurance experience the health care world of poor people in various underdeveloped countries. Most of the medical facilities are too expensive for these people and they are left with virtually no health care.
