= Ross Terrill =

Australian-born American China specialist (1938–2024)

- Born: Ross Gladwin Terrill; 22 August 1938; Melbourne, Victoria, Australia
- Died: 2 August 2024 (aged 85); Boston, Massachusetts, U.S.
- Education: Harvard University; University of Melbourne
- Occupations: Political scientist; historian
- Awards: George Polk Award (1971)

Ross Gladwin Terrill (22 August 1938 – 2 August 2024) was an Australian-born American political scientist and historian. He was best known for his studies in the history of China, especially the history of the People's Republic of China. He testified in front of committees of the United States Congress, and he wrote numerous articles and nine books. For many years he was a research associate at Harvard's Fairbank Center for Chinese Studies, and he was a visiting professor at the University of Texas at Austin, as well as a visiting professor at Monash University in Australia.

== Early life ==
Ross Gladwin Terrill was born in Melbourne, Australia, on 22 August 1938, to Miriel (Lloyd) Terrill and Frank Gregston. Terrill grew up in Bruthen, Victoria, and attended Wesley College in Melbourne, where he became Dux in 1956. He served in the Australian Army from 1957 to 1958.

In 1962, Terrill attended the University of Melbourne where he completed his Honours in history and political science. In 1965, shortly after completing his honours degree, Terrill immigrated to the United States, of which he became a citizen in 1979. Terrill completed his PhD in political science in 1970 at Harvard University, where he studied with Stanley Hoffmann, Benjamin I. Schwartz, and John King Fairbank. His thesis earned the Sumner Prize in 1970.

Terrill published many books on politics, Chinese political leaders and Australian life. His works include The Australians, Madam Mao, The New Chinese Empire and Where is China Going? These works proved to be popular among the East Asian countries, with over 1.5 million copies of Terrill's Mao (translated into Chinese) sold in China. Terrill also spent some of his life in the public eye through his appearances on The Today Show four times, CBS News as a commentator, and ABC's Nightline.

Throughout his early life, Terrill travelled regularly to East Asia, specifically China, where he immersed himself in the culture and developed a fascination for Chinese history and Chinese politics. In a recounting of his first trip to Beijing, Terrill described the difficulties for an Australian to travel to China on a visa in the 1960s. In his writings, he highlighted how few Westerners had set foot in the People's Republic of China, with Australians requiring permission from the Government to visit. Terrill also mentioned that upon his arrival in the Beijing airport, he was met with a guide from the China International Travel Service, so as to ensure he could appropriately experience New China. In Terrill's 'An Australian Gets to Beijing, 1964', his early fascination with the Chinese government and Mao Zedong in particular became clear in which he depicts his exploration of China including their buildings, hotels, government and religion. His work also aided in describing the cultural differences between the Western and Eastern civilisation in their food preferences. Since his first trip to Beijing in 1964, Terrill re-visited China more than twenty times. In his memoir, Terrill stated that this exploration of China “.... had launched me on a path that might hold my feet for many years”, thus beginning his career as a historian of China.

== Career ==
Inspired by his travels around Asia, Terrill devoted his time to understanding Chinese history, focusing his career on providing an insight into the Chinese government and political affiliations. Between 1962 and 1963, Terrill began his career as a tutor in political science at the University of Melbourne, Australia. In 1962 and 1964–65, Terrill's career took a religious turn when he began working with the Australian Student Christian Movement where he remained until 1968. During his time with this group, he became a teaching fellow in political science at Harvard.

He then became a lecturer in government at Harvard from 1970 to 1974. In 1970 Terrill also spent time as a research associate with the Fairbank Center for East Asian Research. Terrill also spent 14 years as an editor for The Atlantic Monthly where he wrote 19 articles and contributed to other magazines such as National Geographic and Foreign Affairs. Throughout his career, Terrill has continued to publish articles on the Chinese government, political leaders such as Mao Zedong and Deng Xiaoping, and China's economy. One of his latest articles labelled Glimpses of Chinese life, tells the story of a Chinese businessman who highlights the importance of changing your life before the age of 35. A sentiment familiar among all Chinese, turning 35 is a special moment and, if at this point you are yet to climb the professional ladder, you are stuck. This article, therefore, describes the life of a Chinese business man who decides to change jobs as a result of Xi Jinping's totalitarian policies, impacting on Chinese society. Some of Terrill's other articles, such as China and the World: Self Reliance or Interdependence?, published in Foreign Affairs in 1977, discuss the integration of China with the ‘rest of the world’ and how this would impact both the people of China and the world culturally, economically, politically and socially.

From 1974 to 1978 Terrill spent most of his time at Harvard as a University Director of Student Programs in International Affairs and associate professor of government. After the death of Mao in 1976, Terrill's trips to China increased, as he visited in 1978, 1980, 1982, and in 1983. In 1978, Terrill also spent a year as a research fellow in East Asian studies at Harvard where he collected and consolidated information on Chinese law and completed other tasks such as editing publication work. He then continued as a professor in several universities such as Monash University from 1996 to 1999 and the University of Texas at Austin from 1998 to 2004.

Throughout his career, Terrill has also spoken at many forums across the United States. These include; the American Academy of Arts and Sciences, Washington Press Club, Fortnightly Club of Chicago, Main Line Forum (Pennsylvania) and Crichton Club of Columbus in Ohio. He has also spent time as a public speaker at many universities such as; Yale, Columbia, UCLA, Texas, University of California, Berkeley, Catholic University, SUNY at Brockport, New College (Florida), Creighton University (Omaha), Princeton, Vassar College; and among foreign universities: Chulalongkorn University (Bangkok), Liaoning (Mukden), Futan (Shanghai), Beijing, People's University of China, Australian National University and the University of Toronto. In 2014 Terrill spoke at the World Conference on Sinology in Beijing where he discussed Chinese and American values under Globalisation.

== Reviews of his work ==
Ross Terrill's works have been widely reviewed in the national press and analysed by specialists. Nick Knight, a specialist in Mao's ideology, criticised Mao: A Biography for not examining Mao's writings on philosophy or drawing on Mao studies in China. Knight continues that although Terrill does utilise some updated sources from China, these missing theoretical texts by Mao might have provided an insight into the influence of Marxism. According to Knight, Mao: A Biography could benefit from updated sources. In his criticism of Terrill's work, Knight states that these updated sources suggest that Mao was greatly influenced by Orthodox Soviet Marxism in the 1930s. However, Terrill claims that Marxism was not significant at all and that the life of Mao is to be understood "by reference to Chinese tradition". In addition to the facts provided in Mao: A Biography, Knight also criticises Terrill's style of writing. Knight argues that the information provided by Terrill is loosely held together by his imaginative and often unrealistic prose style. To enhance his arguments, Knight states that Terrill was incorrect in his statement that in 1938 Mao wrote Basic Tactics, a manual for military officers, which Knight claims is rebutted in the updated sources on Mao.

However, Shia-ling Liu provides a positive review of Terrill's China in Our Time: The Epic Saga of the People's Republic: From the Communist Victory to Tiananmen Square and Beyond in 1995. The book includes Terrill's reflections on his travels in China since 1964. Liu writes that the book is "rich in information, revealing in dialogue, captivating in description and highly readable". According to Liu, Terrill's beliefs about China have changed drastically since the 1960s, as he admits in his book that he believes that there are certain 'secrets' about China which, as a tourist, he is not privy to. Within this review, Liu also comments on The Future of China, another of Terrill's works in which he predicted a close diplomatic relationship between the United States and China in 1978. Liu's review of Terrill's works eventually turns into a recounting of Terrill's opinions of China, describing how his point of view on Chinese policy, people and government have changed over time. Liu concludes the review in agreement with Terrill and his visualisation of a "new order" of Chinese politics toward democracy.

Terrill has responded to critics such as Franklin Woo and his Review of The New Chinese Empire and What It Means for the United States in 2005. Terrill provided facts to emphasise his view on why Woo's review was misguided and more American focused than Chinese focused. Terrill responds to Woo's critique of his work by arguing that he fails to provide a description of what The New Chinese Empire and What It Means for the United States is truly about and, therefore, the reader of Woo's review is bound to be confused. In his response, Terrill suggests that Woo fails to recognise that the comments made regarding the United States being a beacon of democracy and freedom are written from the point of view of the Chinese. According to Terrill, the thousands of Chinese wishing to migrate to the United States each year speaks for “the appeal of American values and opportunities”. Terrill responded to Woo's suggestion that he was in the service of the “US military-industrial-academic complex” by denying that there was evidence to support this claim. In response to Terrill's claims, Woo argues that both he and Terrill have different views on politics, religion and Chinese influence which becomes evident through their writing. Woo further argues that Terrill's book is full of negatives in which he claims that China, as a powerful authoritarian state, has become oppressive toward its people, thus mirroring the description of Terrill's changed views of China in China in Our Time: The Epic Saga of the People's Republic: From the Communist Victory to Tiananmen Square and Beyond. However, Woo states that he does not believe that either he or Terrill are incorrect in their criticisms or writings, just that their perceptions of China differ greatly. Woo further replied that Terrill only reported on the negatives whereas Woo suggests a brighter, more positive future for China.

== Personal life and death ==
Terrill published two volumes of memoirs: Australian Bush and Tiananmen Square (2021), and Breaking the Rules: The Intimate Diary of Ross Terrill (2023). In the second book, he revealed that he was gay, detailing his personal relationships after having kept his sexuality a secret throughout his career. His travels to East Asia and the US were frequently characterized by sexual encounters with young men of all ethnicities, including visits to gay saunas and massage parlours.

After a period of declining health, Terrill died at his home in Boston on 2 August 2024, at the age of 85.

== Achievements/Awards ==
Throughout his life, Terrill received many awards for his works including the following:

- Exhibition in Political Science (University of Melbourne, 1957)
- Frank Knox Memorial Fellowship (Harvard University, 1965, 1966)
- Sumner Prize for PhD. Thesis (Harvard University, 1970)
- National Magazine Award for Reporting Excellence (1972)
- George Polk Memorial Award for Outstanding Magazine Reporting (1972)
- Los Angeles Times Book Prize for his book The New Chinese Empire (2004)
- Curtin-MacArthur Leadership Award (2006)

== Selected publications ==
- ed., China Profile (Boston: Beacon Press, 1970)
- Bruce Douglass Ross Terrill, ed., China and Ourselves: Explorations and Revisions by a New Generation (Boston: Beacon Press, 1970)
- 800000000: The Real China (Boston: Little, Brown 1972)
- R. H. Tawney and His Times; Socialism as Fellowship (Cambridge, Massachusetts,: Harvard University Press, 1973)
- Flowers on an Iron Tree: Five Cities of China (Boston: Little, Brown, 1975)
- The Future of China: After Mao (New York: Dell Pub. Co., 1978)
- ed., The China Difference (New York: Harper & Row, 1979)
- The White-Boned Demon: A Biography of Madame Mao Zedong (New York: Morrow, 1984)
- The Australians (New York: Simon and Schuster, 1987)
- China in Our Time: The Epic Saga of the People's Republic from the Communist Victory to Tiananmen Square and Beyond (New York: Simon & Schuster, 1992)
- Mao: A Biography (New York: Harper & Row, 1980; rev. Stanford, CA: Stanford University Press, 1999)
- The Australians: The Way We Live Now, Random House, Sydney (2000)
- The New Chinese Empire: And What It Means for the United States (New York: Basic Books, 2003)
- ed., The Future of Chinese Imperialism, in Empire and the Future of World Order, Johnson, Stockholm, 2007
- Australian Bush to Tiananmen Square, Hamilton Books, London; New York (2020)
