= Detroit: An American Autopsy =

Book by Charlie LeDuff

- Author: Charlie LeDuff
- Language: English
- Genre: Non-fiction
- Published: 2013
- Publisher: Penguin Books
- ISBN: 978-1-59420-534-7

Detroit: An American Autopsy is a 2013 book by Charlie LeDuff, published by Penguin Books. In the book LeDuff discusses the present state of Detroit and its economic, social, crime, and political issues.

LeDuff had grown up in the Detroit suburbs (Westland/Livonia), left and become a journalist, working for The New York Times for a decade and winning a Pulitzer Prize while there. In March 2008 he was living in Los Angeles with his family when he decided to move back to Detroit.

The book material originates from news stories LeDuff, a journalist, had covered for The Detroit News. His discussion of the crime issue includes interviews with police officers, and there is also a segment about firefighters combating arsonists. His discussion of Detroit politics includes interactions with Detroit Mayor Kwame Kilpatrick and political figures including Adolph Mongo and Monica Conyers. Duff includes stories about his own family life. James Sullivan of the Boston Globe stated "Like listening to him hold court in a corner bar, the book scuttles from one grueling episode to the next, both personal and professional."

The audiobook version uses reader Eric Martin. In the audio version Martin uses various speech styles, including both educated and inner city styles.

== Reception ==
Paul Clemens of The New York Times wrote that "LeDuff has done his best, and his book is better than good." Sue-Ellen Beauregard of Booklist concluded that the book is "[a]n eye-opening look".

In regards to the audio version, Beauregard wrote "Even if Martin mispronounces Mackinac (Michiganders know the final syllable sounds like "naw"), he makes us believe that his voice is that of the crusty reporter."

LeDuff was interviewed about the book on NPR's Fresh Air program on February 11, 2013.

== See also ==
- Detroit City Is the Place to Be
