= Invisible Child: Poverty, Survival & Hope in an American City =

2021 book by Andrea Elliott

- Author: Andrea Elliott
- Language: English
- Publisher: Random House
- Publication date: October 5, 2021
- Publication place: United States
- Awards: Pulitzer Prize for General Nonfiction
- ISBN: 978-0-8129-8694-5

Invisible Child: Poverty, Survival & Hope in an American City is a book written by Andrea Elliott. The book took eight years to write, and is the extension of Elliott's original reporting 2013 on the life of Dasani, a homeless black girl in New York city. The book explores several themes, including the failure in the city's safety net and support for those in poverty, glaring wealth disparity, and the cycle of violence.

== Reviews ==
This book has been reviewed by editors of The New York Times, The Times, The Week, The Irish Times, NPR, The Guardian and The Washington Post. Matthew Desmond, the winner of the Pulitzer Prize in non-fiction for his book Evicted in 2017, wrote a positive review in The New York Times in 2021.

== Awards ==
- Pulitzer Prize for General Nonfiction in 2022
- J. Anthony Lukas Book Prize in 2022
- Helen Bernstein Book Award for Excellence in Journalism in 2022
- Gotham Book Prize in 2022
- Finalist for Los Angeles Times Book Prize for Current Interest
- One of the Barack Obama's Favorite Book of the Year 2021
- Listed in "The 10 Best Books of 2021" by The New York Times
- Listed in "The 100 Must-Read Books Of 2021" by Time
- Listed in "Five of the Best Books of 2021" by The Atlantic
- Listed in "10 books to help you understand inequality — and possible solutions" by Los Angeles Times
- Listed in "8 New Books You Should Read in October" by Time
