= T. R. Reid =

American journalist and author (born 1944)

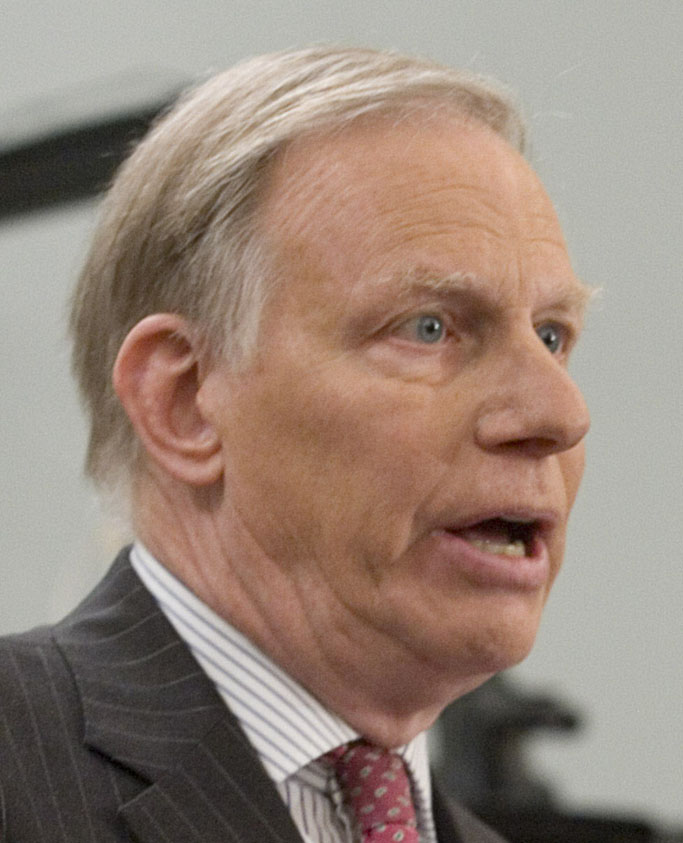
- Reid at Miller Center in 2011
- Born: Thomas Roy Reid III; 1944 (age 81–82); Baltimore, Maryland
- Education: Princeton University (BA); George Washington University (JD)
- Occupations: Journalist; Documentary film correspondent, author
- Known for: NPR Morning Edition frequent guest
- Notable work: The Healing of America; The Chip
- Website: www.trreid.net

T. R. Reid (born Thomas Roy Reid III in 1944) is an American reporter, documentary film correspondent, and author. He has also been a frequent guest on National Public Radio (NPR)'s Morning Edition. Reid currently lives in Denver, Colorado.

== Career ==
Reid, a Classics major at Princeton University, served as a naval officer, taught, and held various positions before working for The Washington Post. At the Post, he covered Congress and four Presidential election campaigns, and was chief of the Post's London, Tokyo and Denver-based Rocky Mountain bureau. He has also taught at Princeton and the University of Michigan. His experiences in Japan led him to write Confucius Lives Next Door: What Living in the East Teaches Us About Living in the West, which argued that Confucian values of family devotion, education, and long-term relations, which still permeate East Asian societies, contributed to their social stability. A 2007 Kaiser Family Foundation media fellow in health, he is a member of the board of the Colorado Coalition for the Homeless and the University of Colorado Medical School.

External videos
- Booknotes interview with Reid on Confucius Lives Next Door, May 16, 1999, C-SPAN
- Presentation by Reid on Confucius Lives Next Door, April 7, 1999, C-SPAN

Reid won an Alicia Patterson Journalism Fellowship in 1982 writing about the U.S. semiconductor industry.

In the fall of 1963, Reid and three other Princeton sophomores—Arthur F. Davidsen, Steven D. Reich, and Frederick W. Talcott (plus Columbia University sophomore Charles A. Lieppe and Michigan State University sophomore Steven E. Cook)—perpetrated one of the most famous hoaxes in Princeton's history. Together, they created the fictitious high school student Joseph David Oznot, who applied for, and gained admission to Princeton. This led to Reid's appearance as a challenger on the television show To Tell the Truth on September 14, 1964.

In 2004, Reid published an analysis of the European Community, The United States of Europe: The New Superpower and The End of American Supremacy. In his book, which was written before the Greek government-debt crisis, Great Britain's exit from the EU, the rejection of the European Constitution by France and Holland, and the re-introduction of temporary border controls during the COVID-19 pandemic by some EU member states, Reid postulated that the European Community was emerging as a united superpower rivaling the political and economic power of the United States.

== Frontline documentaries on health care ==
His 2008 documentary for the U.S. television series Frontline, Sick Around the World, looked at the comprehensive health care systems of five developed economies from around the world. The first two countries visited were the United Kingdom and Japan, where he had previously lived, worked, and also received medical care. They were followed by Germany, Taiwan, and Switzerland.

External videos
- Q&A interview with Reid on The Healing of America, September 6, 2009, C-SPAN
- Washington Journal interview with Reid on The Healing of America, November 19, 2009, C-SPAN
- Q&A interview with Reid on A Fine Mess, May 21, 2017, C-SPAN

Frontline asked Reid to follow up with a companion documentary, Sick Around America, which aired March 31, 2009, on PBS. However, Reid parted company with PBS before the film was finished when his conclusion, quoted by Russell Mokhiber in CounterPunch that "You can't allow a profit to be made on the basic package of health insurance", was omitted from the program. Instead, Reid argued that the film came off as supporting mandated private-insurance coverage. Reid was quoted as saying "...mandating for-profit insurance is not the lesson from other countries in the world. I said I'm not going to be in a film that contradicts my previous film and my book." PBS responded to these criticisms, stating that "Frontline takes a strongly different view of the characterization of its editorial disagreement with T. R. Reid as presented by Reid and Russell Mokhiber." It argued that Reid had misrepresented the role of a key respondent in the film, the extent of Reid's role in making the film, and the balance PBS had sought to present. Reid used his right of reply to challenge PBS's characterization of their and his own positions.

His investigations into health care resulted in his New York Times bestselling book The Healing of America: A Global Quest for Better, Cheaper and Fairer Health Care. In 2015, Reid became chairman of the Colorado Foundation for Universal Health Care. In that role, he served as a lead spokesman in the campaign for Amendment 69, the unsuccessful November 2016 Colorado ballot initiative to create ColoradoCare, a state-based health plan to cover all Colorado residents. The ColoradoCare initiative Reid championed had hoped to "demonstrate that universal coverage can work. And then Colorado will lead our great nation to a destination we should have achieved long ago: high-quality health care, at reasonable cost, for every American."

Reid also served on the board of Princeton University, the Health Research and Education Trust, and the Japan-America Society of Colorado. He is vice-chairman of the board of the Colorado Coalition for the Homeless.

T. R. Reid's latest book, A Fine Mess: A Global Quest for a Simpler, Fairer, and More Efficient Tax System, was published on April 15, 2017.

== Publications ==
External videos
- In Depth interview with Reid, March 7, 2010, C-SPAN
- Presentation by Reid on The Chip, October 25, 2001, C-SPAN
- Presentation by Reid on The United States of Europe, November 16, 2004, C-SPAN
- Washington Journal interview with Reid on The United States of Europe, January 7, 2005 , C-SPAN

- Reid, T. R. (2017). A Fine Mess: A Global Quest for a Simpler, Fairer, and More Efficient Tax System. Penguin Press. ISBN 978-1594205514. OCLC 959037284.
- Reid, T. R. (2009). The Healing of America: A Global Quest for Better, Cheaper and Fairer Health Care. The Penguin Press. ISBN 978-1-59420-234-6.
- Reid, T. R. (2004). United States of Europe: The New Superpower and the End of American Supremacy. Penguin Books. ISBN 978-1-59420-033-5.
- Reid, T. R. (2001). The Chip: How Two Americans Invented the Microchip and Launched a Revolution (Rev. ed.). Random House. ISBN 978-0-375-75828-7.
- Reid, T. R. (2000). Confucius Lives Next Door: What Living in the East Teaches Us About Living in the West. Random House. ISBN 978-0-679-77760-1.
- Inamori, Kazuo (1997). For People and for Profit: A Business Philosophy for the 21st Century. T. R. Reid, trans. Kodansha International. ISBN 978-4-7700-2030-7. Translation of:
  - Inamori, Kazuo (1994). Atarashii Nihon, Atarashii Keiei: Sekai to Kyōseisuru Shiza o Motomete. TBS Buritanika. ISBN 978-4-484-94204-9.
- Reid, Tom R. (1996). Nippon Kenbunroku: Daisuki na Nihonjin e Okuru Shin Kaikokuron [Heisei Highs and Lows]. Bilingual Books 8 (in Japanese and English). Kodansha International. ISBN 978-4-7700-2092-5.
- Reid, T. R. (1994). Ski Japan!. Kodansha International. ISBN 978-4-7700-1680-5.
- Reid, T. R.; Kenshi Hirokane (1993). Seiko Hoteishiki [The Formula for Success] (in Japanese). Kodansha.
- Reid, T. R. (1994). Tomu no Me Tomu no Mimi: Nihonjin no Kigatsukanai Nippon no Sugata (in Japanese). Kodansha. ISBN 978-4-06-206677-8.
- Reid, T. R. (1985). Microchip: The Story of a Revolution and the Men Who Made it. Pan Macmillan. ISBN 978-0-330-29338-9.
- Reid, T. R. (1984). The Chip: How Two Americans Invented the Microchip and Launched a Revolution (1st ed.). Simon & Schuster. ISBN 978-0-671-45393-0.
- Reid, T. R. (1980). Congressional Odyssey. W. H. Freeman & Co. ISBN 978-0-7167-1171-1.
