= Colorado Springs Sun =

Newspaper published in Colorado, United States

- Type: Daily newspaper
- Format: Broadsheet
- Headquarters: Colorado Springs, Colorado, U.S.

The Colorado Springs Sun (1946–1986) was a broadsheet-format newspaper published in Colorado Springs, Colorado, United States. A daily newspaper, The Sun competed with The Gazette-Telegraph until 1986, when Aero bought it for $30 million, shut it down, retaining its trademark and naming rights. The sale included the Sun's archives and its name.

It was founded in 1947 after a labor dispute by the International Typographical Union whose members were locked out of the Gazette Telegraph. It went on to compete with the Colorado Springs Gazette for 39 years. The Gazette-Telegraph purchased it and immediately shut it down. It was succeeded in 1993 by the Colorado Springs Independent, an "Indy" newspaper established by John Weiss and Kathryn Carpenter Eastburn. Colorado College and the Press Peak Library District has a collection of its issues.
