= Killing of Claudia Gómez González =

Guatemalan woman killed by US Border Patrol

Claudia Patricia Gómez González (9 February 1998 – 23 May 2018) was a Guatemalan woman shot by a US Border Patrol agent on 23 May 2018 after crossing the US-Mexican border near Rio Bravo, Texas.

== Early life ==
Claudia Patricia Gómez González was born 9 February 1998 in the village of La Unión Los Mendoza in the municipality of San Juan Ostuncalco, a rural area near Quetzaltenango, Guatemala to Gilberto Gómez Vicente and Lidia González Vasquez. She was an indigenous Mayan Mam and the eldest of three sisters. She was the first member of her family to graduate from high school, where she earned a certificate in accounting in 2016. Her father worked for several years in Atlanta but was deported in 2017.

== Emigration decision ==
Gómez González didn't pass the entrance exam for Universidad de San Carlos, Guatemala's only public university, and her parents couldn't afford to send her to a private university. She had been unable to find work. The family had difficulty paying for the younger children's schooling. According to Marie-Claire, "she saw migrating to the United States as her only hope." An aunt living in Atlanta offered to loan her the $11,000 she needed to get to the US.

== Death ==
Planning to stay with her aunt in Atlanta and find work cleaning houses, she left Guatemala 7 May 2018, accompanied by a paid guide, and on 22 May arrived in Nuevo Laredo, Mexico, where she was taken to a safe house with other Guatemalans planning to cross the border, and phoned home. Late in the morning of 23 May she and five young men crossed the Rio Grande and, as instructed by their guide, went into an abandoned building near Centeno Lane in Rio Bravo, about a mile over the border, to wait for the next guide. They saw a Border Guard officer and ran away, hiding in some bushes. Two of the men ran away. Two others ran into an abandoned trailer, leaving Gómez González and one man behind. A witness reported Gómez González took a step, and the agent took aim and fired, shooting her in the head, then running into the trailer.

The two men in the trailer told reporters they heard the shot, and an officer holding a gun came into the trailer, pointing the gun at them and telling them to leave the trailer. The men left the trailer and were handcuffed, and they saw paramedics working over Gómez González.

== Aftermath ==
Customs and Border Protection (CBP) first reported that Gómez González, who was described as petite and timid, and the rest of the group had attacked the officer with blunt objects and resisted arrest, and that he had shot in self-defense. Marta Martinez, a woman who lived nearby, heard the shot and ran outside. She streamed the aftermath of the incident, in which she can repeatedly be heard asking why the agent had killed Gómez González. The video went viral, and the CBP account changed to the group had "allegedly assaulted" and "rushed the agent". Three of the men accompanying Gómez González were arrested and detained to testify; according to The Guardian, after five months, "tired of incarceration, they opted to be deported home and return to testify in the US, if a criminal charge is brought against the agent." Information released about the agent involved in the shooting included that he had been a CBP agent for fifteen years and that he had been placed on administrative leave.

As of May 2019, an FBI investigation was ongoing. Gómez González's family said they had not been contacted.

In May 2019, the American Civil Liberties Union of Texas filed a claim for US$100 million in damages on behalf of Gómez González's parents under the Federal Tort Claims Act. In May 2020 they filed a lawsuit in Laredo against the US and multiple CBP agents believed to have been at the scene. One agent was mentioned by name as the agent the ACLU believed was the agent involved, saying that if it hadn't been that agent, it was one of the other agents at the scene. In November 2020 El Manana reported the investigation had not been resolved.
