= Charlie LeDuff =

American writer

- Born: April 1, 1966 (age 60); Portsmouth, Virginia, U.S.
- Education: University of Michigan; University of California, Berkeley Graduate School of Journalism
- Occupations: Journalist, author, media personality
- Writing career
- Notable awards: Pulitzer Prize (2001)
- Website: charlieleduff.com – non-working

Charles Royal LeDuff (born April 1, 1966) is an American journalist, writer, and media personality. He is the host of the No BS News Hour with Charlie LeDuff. LeDuff was employed by The New York Times for 12 years, then employed by The Detroit News, leaving in October 2010 after two years to join the Detroit Fox affiliate WJBK Channel 2 to do on-air journalism. LeDuff left Fox 2 Detroit on December 1, 2016. LeDuff has won a number of prestigious journalism awards, including a Pulitzer Prize, but has also faced accusations of plagiarism and distortion in his career, to which he has responded.

== Biography ==
Charlie LeDuff was born in Portsmouth, Virginia. He is one eighth Ojibway. He discovered as an adult that his paternal grandfather was Creole (of African and French descent).

LeDuff grew up in Westland, Michigan. He attended Winston Churchill High School in Livonia, Michigan and the University of Michigan. At the University of Michigan, LeDuff was a brother of the Theta Delta Chi fraternity. His father served in the U.S. Navy. His parents' marriage ended in divorce. He has a deceased sister and stepbrother. LeDuff has four surviving siblings. He has lived in many cities around the country and the world. Before joining The New York Times, LeDuff worked as a schoolteacher and carpenter in Michigan and a cannery hand in Alaska. He has also worked as a baker in Denmark.

LeDuff previously lived with his wife, Amy Kuzniar, and his daughter in Pleasant Ridge, Michigan, a northern suburb of Detroit. He considers himself a political independent, and is a practicing Roman Catholic. LeDuff is also a member of the Sault Ste. Marie Chippewa tribe of Michigan.

In December 2023, LeDuff was arrested and charged with domestic violence after a 911 call to his home. LeDuff pleaded not guilty, was released on bail and is prohibited from contacting his wife. On May 14, 2024, the charges against LeDuff were dismissed, after his wife invoked her Fifth Amendment rights and refused to testify.

== Writing career ==
LeDuff's stated writing influences include the books Hop on Pop, To Kill a Mockingbird, The Grapes of Wrath, Treasure Island, and writers Mickey Spillane, Raymond Carver, Joseph Mitchell, Ernest Hemingway, Dorothy Parker, and Raymond Chandler. Among writers in the newspaper business who influenced him, LeDuff lists Mike Royko, Jimmy Breslin, and Pete Hamill.

=== Journalism ===
After graduating from the University of California, Berkeley Graduate School of Journalism, LeDuff was hired by The New York Times on a ten-week minority scholarship. He was a staff reporter at The Times from 1995, ending his tenure as a member of the Los Angeles bureau. He covered the murder of Ruby Jean Johnson, and his profile on her was cited when he won the 1999 Columbia Journalism Award. LeDuff, who had been on paternity leave, quit The Times in 2007 to pursue the promotion of his second book, US Guys, according to a memorandum from Suzanne Daley, the national editor. The next day LeDuff said his rationale for leaving was more complicated, noting that he made an appointment with Arthur Sulzberger Jr., the publisher and chairman of The Times, to say he would be leaving because, "I can't write the things I want to say. I want to talk about race, I want to talk about class. I want to talk about the things we should be talking about."

Of his professional career in newspapers, LeDuff states:

I’m not a journalist, I’m a reporter. The difference between a reporter and a journalist is that a journalist can type without looking. The problem with journalism is its self-importance. Like in the New York Times, there’s style guides; you can’t call a doctor a physician, you got to call him a doctor- too high falutin’. You can’t call an undertaker a mortician- too high falutin’; you got to call him an undertaker. You can’t call a lawyer an attorney, you have to call him a lawyer. But somehow, since we control it, and we’re very self-important people, you can call a reporter a journalist.

LeDuff is best known as a contributor to the 2001 Pulitzer Prize-winning New York Times project, "How Race Is Lived in America"; a ten-part series, including a piece by LeDuff called "At a Slaughterhouse Some Things Never Die". In 1999, the Columbia University School of Journalism gave him its Mike Berger Award for distinguished writing about New York City.

From August to November 2006, LeDuff wrote an eight-part series for The New York Times called American Album. The series was composed of articles and videos presenting "portraits of offbeat Americans". The profiles included pieces about "a Latina from the rough side of Dallas" who "works the lobster shift at a Burger King," a Minuteman and an Alaska national guardsman believed to be the first Inuk, or Eskimo, killed because of the Iraq war. LeDuff has covered the war in Iraq, crossed the border with Mexican migrants, and chronicled a Brooklyn fire house in the aftermath of 9/11.

In January 2022, The Guardian published an article by LeDuff and Jordan Chariton (Status Coup News) about the lack of bribery and racketeering (RICO) charges in the years-long Flint water scandal, even under Democratic Attorney General Dana Nessel, in office since 2019. The duo was interviewed on The Hill's Rising news program by Ryan Grim and Robby Soave. and Michael Moore interviewed Chariton on his Rumble podcast (mid-February episode 230).

=== Controversies ===
LeDuff has been repeatedly accused of plagiarism and of reporting inaccuracies, to which he has responded.

A 1995 article for The East Bay Monthly was examined by Modern Luxury's San Francisco publication in a February 2004 article titled "Charlie LeDuff's Bay Area Secret" following suggestions that LeDuff had plagiarized elements of Ted Conover's book Rolling Nowhere: Riding the Rails With America's Hoboes.

A January 18, 2003, article for The New York Times entitled "As an American Armada Leaves San Diego, Tears Are the Rule of the Day" was accused of featuring inaccurate quotations and depictions of two of the ten subjects interviewed, according to an article published in September 2003 by Marvin Olasky in the evangelical WORLD magazine. According to Olasky, Lieutenant Commander Beidler, a subject profiled with his wife in the man-on-the-street piece, recalled saying something else to LeDuff and believed the quotes and depictions of himself and his wife used were inaccurate and fabricated by LeDuff. According to Olasky, Times senior editor Bill Borders wrote to Beidler, saying that he had "thoroughly looked into your complaint" and concluding "[Mr. LeDuff] thinks that he accurately represented his interview with you and your wife, and therefore so do I."

A December 8, 2003, article for The New York Times entitled "Los Angeles by Kayak: Vistas of Concrete Banks" was accused of drawing from Blake Gumprecht's 1999 book The Los Angeles River: Its Life, Death, and Possible Rebirth. One week later, on December 15, 2003, The New York Times appended a clarification:

An article last Monday about the Los Angeles River recounted its history and described the reporter's trip downriver in a kayak. In research for the article, the reporter consulted a 1999 book by Blake Gumprecht, "The Los Angeles River: Its Life, Death, and Possible Rebirth." Several passages relating facts and lore about the river distilled passages from the book. Although the facts in those passages were confirmed independently—through other sources or the reporter's first hand observation—the article should have acknowledged the significant contribution of Mr. Gumprecht's research.

— Editors' Note, December 15, 2003

LeDuff discussed various accusations made against his reporting in a March 11, 2008, interview with essayist Dan Schneider.

To set the record straight… If you make mistakes, you apologize. When I was at grad school, I was working on a documentary and I was also contracted to write a long, six thousand word piece… I borrowed some thoughts from a guy’s book… Not incidents, none of that, sort of light stuff… I made a mistake as a student and I apologized for it.

Later on, at The New York Times, it was post-Jason Blair…like a witch hunt. Everybody wanted to get everybody that worked there and I wasn’t really accused of plagiarism, but what I did was did not attribute some facts that I distilled from a book about the Los Angeles River which I kayaked, and all this went round and round and all of a sudden I was a fraud, I was a cheat, I was a minority who didn’t do his work, who got a break because of his background and it isn’t true...

All I’ve ever tried to do in life is tell the truth, work hard, document the undocumented. I’ve crossed the border with Mexicans, man, I worked in a slaughterhouse, I do what it takes, I don’t cheat… My problem with the Right Wing and the Left Wing… is they got so many facts wrong… the journalistic sin is: you write something about somebody, you man up, and you call them. So the facts are wrong… A commissioned officer in the Navy accused me of misquoting him, I don’t think I did. If I did, I apologized about it. You write a thousand, two thousand stories, it’s gonna happen.

I don’t fake quotes, I don’t fake stories, I don’t fake anything, man. I work hard… This is how I get people to talk to me, because I don’t lie about who I am, I don’t hang around the edges, I don’t mischaracterize myself for the business at hand. I’m straightforward and I’m trying to be a standup guy.

— Cosmoetica.com/dsi9.htm Dan Schneider Interview 9, Cosmoetica

In January 2009, LeDuff gained nationwide attention for a human-interest story after being tipped off that a group of local amateur hockey players had failed to notify authorities after discovering the frozen body of a homeless person in an abandoned warehouse in Detroit. The following month, Metro Times reporter Curt Guyette accused LeDuff of sensationalizing the story, noting that the body had been discovered 48 hours prior to LeDuff being tipped off (not a week), that only one of the hockey players had known about the body (not all of them), that police had arrived within 30 minutes of LeDuff's call to 911 (not 24 hours), and that LeDuff's portrayal of the tip as a possible hoax was unreasonable (LeDuff's younger brother, Frank Parker, was the tipster).

In 2011, LeDuff was sued for defamation over a story he wrote in The Detroit News. A Detroit police officer alleged that LeDuff's stories asserted that she moonlighted as a stripper and danced at a never-proven party at the Detroit mayor's mansion. The officer denied both accusations. The suit was ultimately dismissed.

In 2012, LeDuff and his employer, Fox 2 News in Detroit, were sued for defamation by Cindy Pasky, owner of Strategic Staffing Solutions (S3) in Detroit. Pasky said LeDuff falsely insinuated that her company was awarded a no-bid contract due to her political donations to the Wayne County Executive. As a result of the lawsuit, Fox 2 later reached a settlement that required them to remove the story from its website and read a statement on-air that said, in part: "It was not our intent to assert or imply that there was any improper conduct on the part of S3. We regret if anyone misinterpreted our report."

In 2013, LeDuff was accused of urging a man to enter the race for Detroit mayor because his name was similar to Mike Duggan's, a then-candidate for mayor who would ultimately win. The Detroit Free Press and WXYZ-TV both reported that Detroit barber Mike Dugeon "told them LeDuff suggested he file when the award-winning and controversial Fox 2 reporter showed up on his porch early Thursday." According to Dugeon, LeDuff said: "'Well wouldn't it be funny to see who would split the votes?' or something like that." LeDuff denied Dugeon's claims, saying he contacted Dugeon after receiving a tip about his interest in entering the race.

Also in 2013, LeDuff was cited for urinating in public at the Detroit St. Patrick's Day parade, accused by witnesses of being drunk in public and later biting a security guard. According to WDIV-TV, "witnesses say LeDuff appeared highly intoxicated and was seen urinating in the street near Brooklyn and Michigan Avenue. LeDuff also was involved in a 'large' fight." LeDuff would later say he was "not really sure what happened," but confirmed he was part of a fight, saying alcohol was to blame. He told WXYZ-TV that he "did not remember" if he urinated in public. LeDuff was not ultimately charged.

In 2016, another lawsuit forced LeDuff and Fox 2 Detroit to admit LeDuff's story was "incorrect." In a report, LeDuff accused the head of the Detroit Land Bank of lying, an assertion that she denied. The director filed suit and, months later, Fox 2 News anchor Monica Gayle would read an on-air apology that said, in part: "We reported based on certain emails Land Bank Director Carrie Lewand-Monroe was in the loop about possible fraud allegations but testified to the contrary at the proceedings.That was incorrect. Lewand-Monroe testified that she didn't recall being made aware of the billing inaccuracies and a closer reading of those emails show they do not specifically accuse anyone of fraud and do not prove that Lewand-Monroe knew about such allegations. Our apologies for the inaccuracy." LeDuff and Fox 2 severed ties later that same year.

In October 2023, LeDuff was fired by The Detroit News for a tweet he authored, directed at Michigan Attorney General Dana Nessel, "See you next Tuesday", a coded reference to the word "cunt". Nearly two months later, he was arrested and charged with domestic violence, allegedly striking a family member at his home.

=== Other writings ===
LeDuff is the author of four books:

- Work and Other Sins: Life in New York City and Thereabouts, 2005
- US Guys: The True and Twisted Mind of the American Man, 2008
- Detroit: An American Autopsy, 2013
- Sh*tshow!: The Country's Collapsing and the Ratings Are Great, 2018

== Television career ==
LeDuff worked on an experimental project for The Times with the Discovery Channel and produced a show called Only in America, which featured participatory journalism where LeDuff played on a semi-professional football team, raced with thoroughbreds, performed in a gay rodeo, joined the circus, preached in Appalachia, joined the elite world of New York models and played one play on special teams for the af2 football club, the Amarillo Dusters.

On July 14, 2006, LeDuff starred in and narrated a documentary on the British channel BBC Four called United Gates of America in which he experienced life with the mainly white, Christian, and middle-class citizens of the gated community Canyon Lake in Riverside County, California.

In December 2010, LeDuff was a reporter for WJBK, the Fox affiliate in Detroit, Michigan. In July 2012, LeDuff's adventure report through various neglected communities of Detroit, including the long-abandoned Packard factory, got national recognition. His series, The Americans, human interest stories about the changing American economy and culture, was syndicated to other Fox Television Stations Group stations for airing on their newscasts.

On November 10, 2013, LeDuff was prominently featured on a Detroit focused episode of the CNN series Anthony Bourdain: Parts Unknown. In February 2015, Vice News announced LeDuff would be a regular contributor. On December 1, 2016, LeDuff announced that he would be leaving WJBK Fox 2 Detroit, but planning to stay in Michigan. In 2016, LeDuff started working at Detroit's American Coney Island diner, working as the restaurant's handyman, while writing a book on the side. In 2018, he became a weekly columnist for Deadline Detroit.

== Radio and podcasting career ==
In September 2018, LeDuff launched The No BS News Hour with Charlie LeDuff, a livestreamed podcast featuring news commentary with a Detroit-centric bent and is part of a "podcast mini-empire" started by Detroit radio personality Drew Lane. A month after the launch, in October 2018, Detroit radio "Superstation" WFDF (AM) 910 began airing the show on a trial basis; the station CEO joked that they'd have to do "a lot of bleeping" for broadcast. He also floated the idea of a late-night talk show with LeDuff on WADL (TV).
