= 2024 National Book Awards =

American literary award

The 75th National Book Awards, presented at a ceremony and benefit dinner by the National Book Foundation, took place on November 20, 2024, at Cipriani Wall Street in New York City. During the gala, the National Book Foundation presented awards in 5 competitive categories and 2 special categories honoring books released between December 1, 2023 and November 30, 2024. Author Barbara Kingsolver and publisher Paul Coates received special recognitions. Comedian Kate McKinnon hosted the show alongside musician Jon Batiste.

== Winners and nominees ==
The longlisted nominees were announced between September 13, 2024 and the shortlisted nominees were announced on October 1, 2024

Category	Winner	Shortlist	Longlist
Fiction	Percival Everett, James	Pemi Aguda, Ghostroots; Kaveh Akbar, Martyr!; Miranda July, All Fours; Hisham Matar, My Friends	Jessica Anthony, The Most; Karla Cornejo Villavicencio, Catalina; Rachel Kushner, Creation Lake; Sam Sax, Yr Dead; Tony Tulathimutte, Rejection
Nonfiction	Jason De León, Soldiers and Kings: Survival and Hope in the World of Human Smuggling	Eliza Griswold, Circle of Hope: A Reckoning With Love, Power, and Justice in an American Church; Kate Manne, Unshrinking: How to Face Fatphobia; Salman Rushdie, Knife: Meditations After an Attempted Murder; Deborah Jackson Taffa, Whiskey Tender	Hanif Abdurraqib, There's Always This Year: On Basketball and Ascension; Vanessa Angélica Villarreal, Magical/Realism: Essays on Music, Memory, Fantasy, and Borders; Rebecca Boyle, Our Moon: How Earth's Celestial Companion Transformed the Planet, Guided Evolution, and Made Us Who We Are; Ernest Scheyder, The War Below: Lithium, Copper, and the Global Battle to Power Our Lives; Richard Slotkin, A Great Disorder: National Myth and the Battle for America
Poetry	Lena Khalaf Tuffaha, Something About Living	Anne Carson, Wrong Norma; Fady Joudah, [...]; M.s. RedCherries, Mother; Diane Seuss, Modern Poetry	Dorianne Laux, Life on Earth; Gregory Pardlo, Spectral Evidence; Octavio Quintanilla, The Book of Wounded Sparrows; Rowan Ricardo Phillips, Silver; Elizabeth Willis, Liontaming in America
Translated Literature	Yang Shuang-zi, Taiwan Travelogue (translated from Mandarin by Lin King)	Bothayna El Essa (as Bothayna Al-Essa), The Book Censor's Library (translated from Arabic by Ranya Abdelrahman and Sawad Hussain); Linnea Axelsson, Ædnan (translated from Swedish by Saskia Vogel); Fiston Mwanza Mujila, The Villain's Dance (translated from French by Roland Glasser); Samar Yazbek, Where the Wind Calls Home (translated from Arabic by Leri Price)	Nasser Abu Srour, The Tale of a Wall: Reflections on the Meaning of Hope and Freedom (translated from Arabic by Luke Leafgren); Solvej Balle, On the Calculation of Volume (Book I) (translated from Danish by Barbara J. Haveland); Layla Martínez, Woodworm (translated from Spanish by Sophie Hughes and Annie McDermott); Fernanda Trías, Pink Slime (translated from Spanish by Heather Cleary); Fernando Vallejo, The Abyss (translated from Spanish by Yvette Siegert)
Young People's Literature	Shifa Saltagi Safadi, Kareem Between	Violet Duncan, Buffalo Dreamer; Josh Galarza, The Great Cool Ranch Dorito in the Sky; Erin Entrada Kelly, The First State of Being; Angela Shanté, The Unboxing of a Black Girl	Olivia A. Cole, Ariel Crashes a Train; Margarita Engle, Wild Dreamers; Randy Ribay, Everything We Never Had; Ali Terese, Free Period; Alicia D. Williams, Mid-Air

=== Special Recognitions ===
Author Barbara Kingsolver received the Medal for Distinguished Contribution to American Letters, a lifetime achievement award, while publisher W. Paul Coates was recognized with the Literarian Award for Outstanding Service.

== Judges ==
The judges in each category are as follows:

Fiction

- Jamie Ford
- Lauren Groff (chair)
- Zeyn Joukhadar
- Chawa Magaña
- Reginald McKnight

Nonfiction

- Brenda J. Child
- Anand Giridharadas
- Tressie McMillan Cottom (chair)
- Timothy Morton
- Arvin Ramgoolam

Poetry

- Richard Blanco (chair)
- Carolyn Forché
- Tyehimba Jess
- Aimee Nezhukumatathil
- Rena Priest

Translated Literature

- Aron Aji
- Jennifer Croft
- Jhumpa Lahiri (chair)
- Gary Lovely
- Julia Sanches

Young People's Literature

- Rose Brock
- Huda Fahmy
- Leah Johnson
- Mike Jung
- Brein Lopez (chair)
