= Hostile Terrain 94 =

Art installation

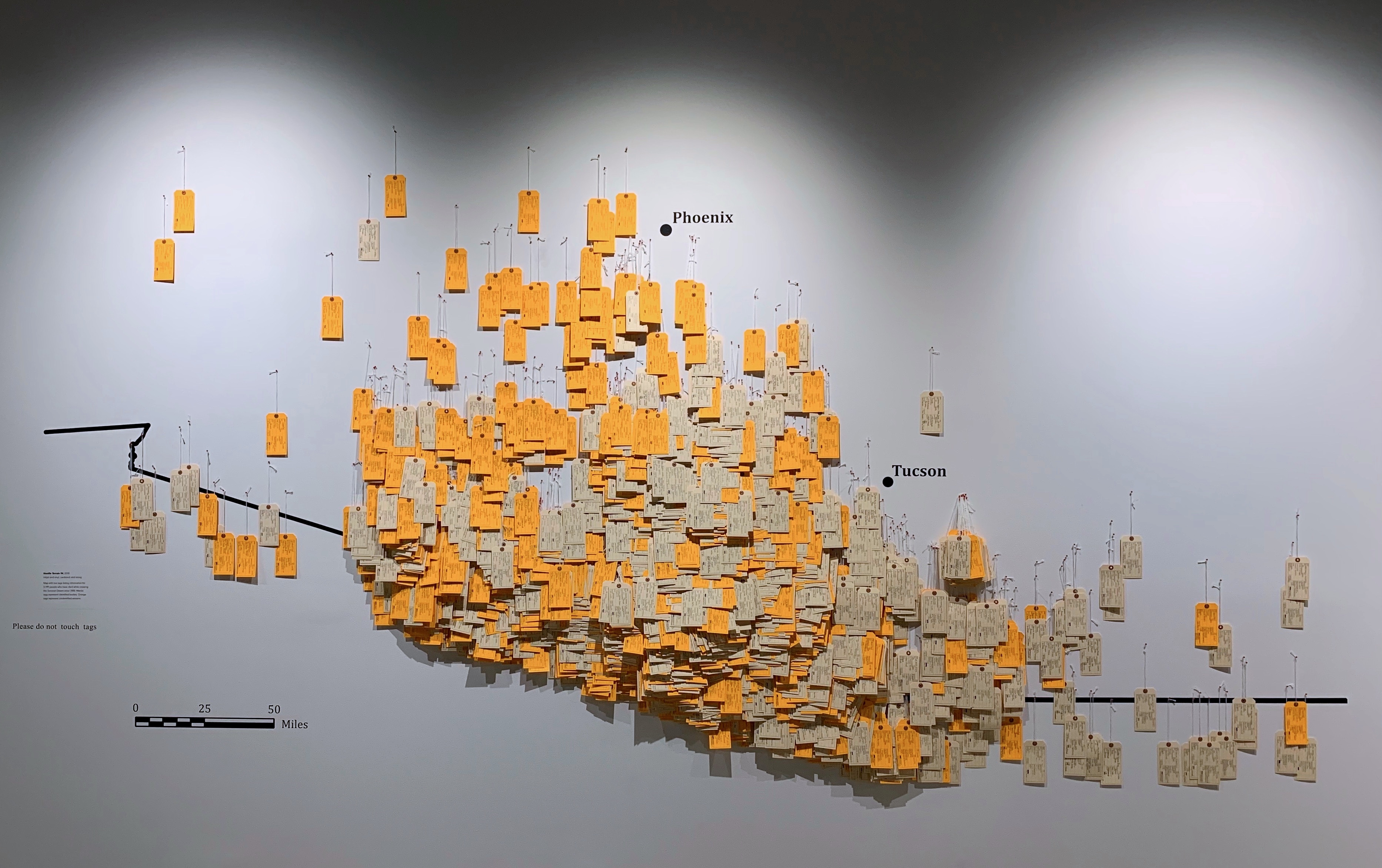
Hostile Terrain 94 on display at the Phillips Museum of Art, Franklin & Marshall College (January 2019)

Hostile Terrain 94 (HT94) is a DIY installation taking place at over 150 institutions––in the U.S. and abroad––with the intention to raise awareness about the humanitarian crisis at America's southern border and to engage with communities around the world in conversations about migration.

== Background ==
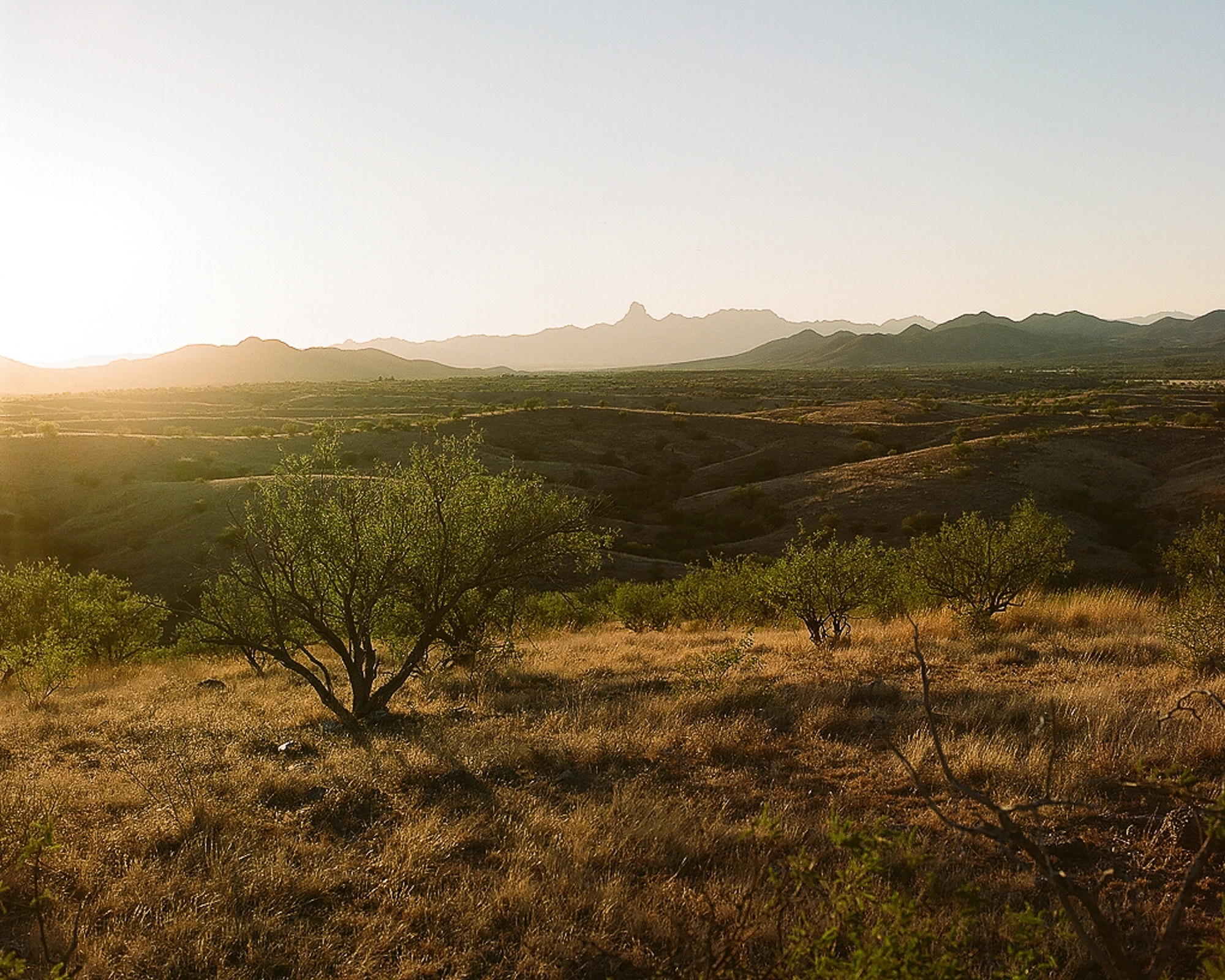
Sonoran Desert, photo by Michael Wells

In 1994, the United States Border Patrol formally implemented the immigration enforcement strategy known as "Prevention Through Deterrence" (PTD), which was designed to discourage undocumented migrants from attempting to cross the U.S./Mexico border near urban ports of entry. Closing off historically frequented crossing points would funnel individuals attempting to cross the border illegally through more remote and unpopulated regions where the natural environment would act as a deterrent to movement.

It was anticipated that the difficulties people would experience while traversing dozens of miles across what the Border Patrol deemed the "hostile terrain" of places such as the Sonoran Desert of Arizona would ultimately discourage migrants from attempting the journey. However, the strategy did not deter border crossers and, instead, more than six million people have attempted to migrate through the Sonoran Desert since the 1990s.

At least 4,200 people have died, largely from dehydration and hyperthermia, while attempting this journey through Southern Arizona. In recent years, this policy has shifted people toward the desolate wilderness of Texas, where hundreds (if not thousands) have perished while migrating through that region. Prevention Through Deterrence is still the primary border enforcement strategy being used on the U.S./Mexico border today.

== Installation ==
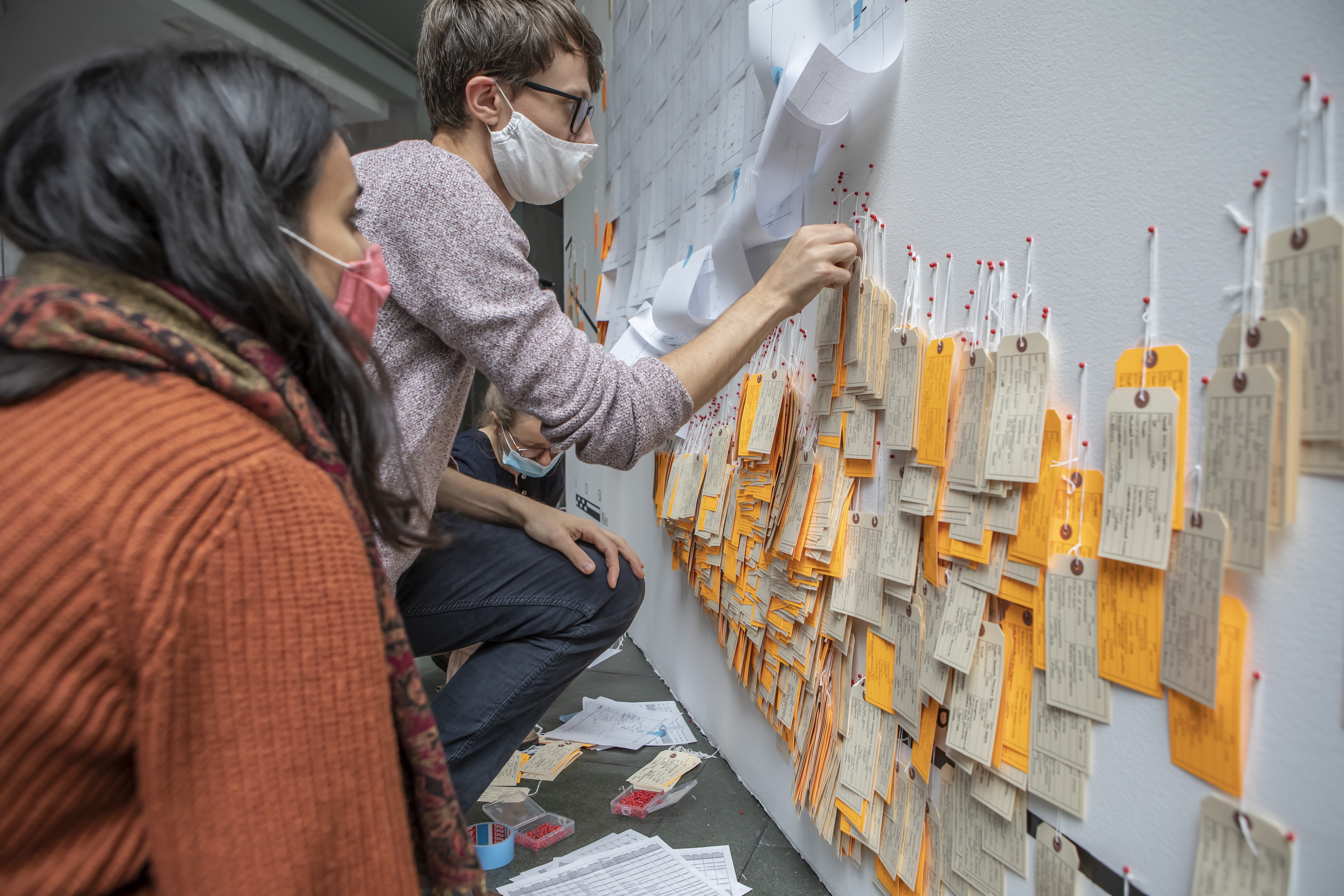
Volunteers install HT94 in Frankfurt (Oder), Germany (October 2020)

Over 150 pop-up installations are planned to be hosted around the globe in locations including Los Angeles, New York, Philadelphia, Detroit, Seattle, Miami, Mexico City, San Pedro Sula (Honduras), San Salvador (El Salvador), Lampedusa (Italy), as well of dozens of smaller communities across the United States and abroad.

The exhibition itself is a large map of the Arizona/Mexico border covered by 4,200 handwritten toe tags, which represent the recovered bodies of people who have died while crossing the U.S./Mexico border through the Sonoran Desert between the 1990s and 2024. Hanging from geolocated pins, the toe tags are color-coded, with manila tags representing identified individuals (approx. 3,100) and orange tags representing unidentified human remains (approx. 1,300).

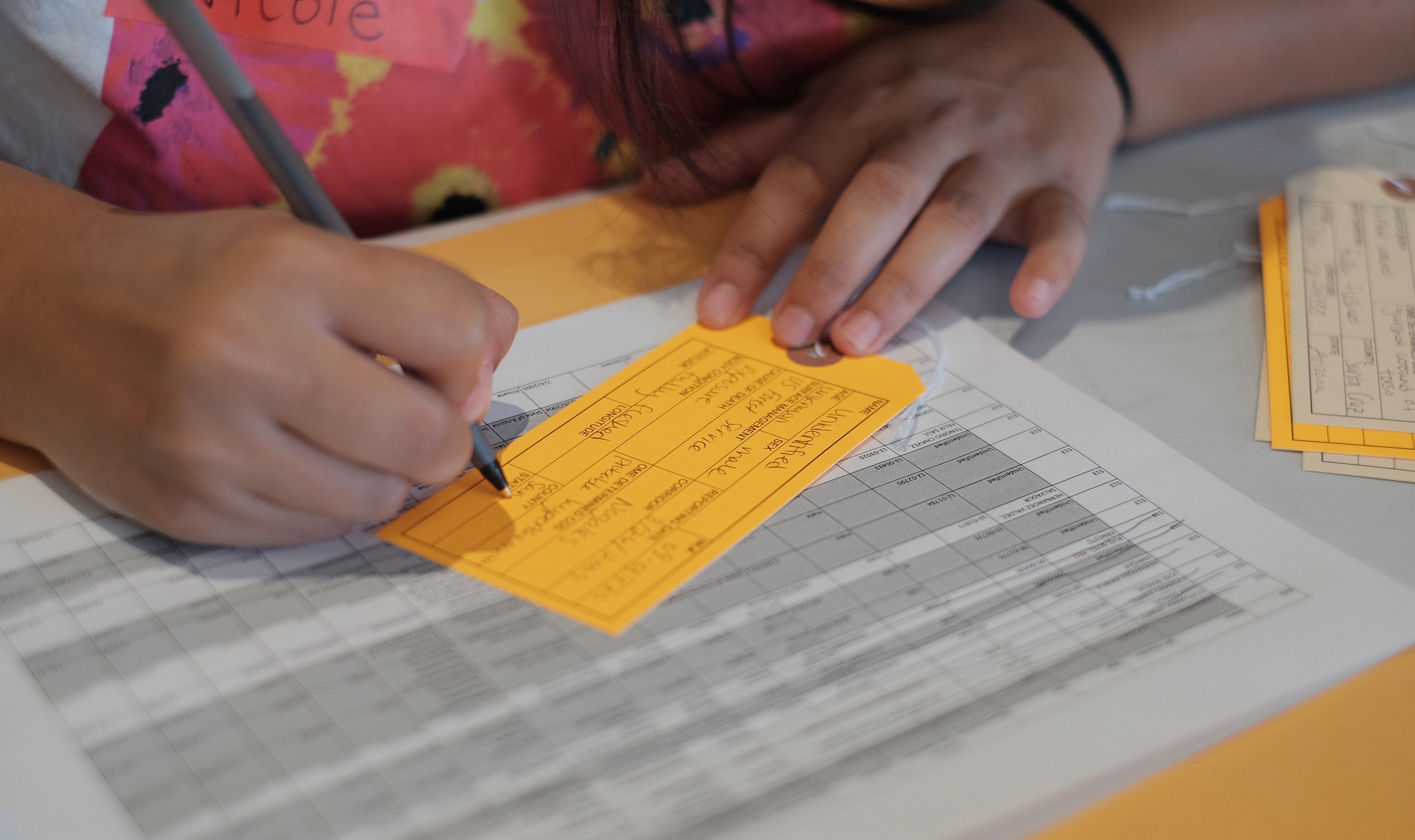
Filling out toe tags at Cypress College in Cypress, California (September 2019)

The construction of HT94 is made possible by teams of volunteers from each hosting location, who participate (in person or through online events) in tag-filling workshops, where they write the details of the dead and then publicly place the tags on the map– in the exact location where each individual's remains were found.

Every installation is accompanied by introductory wall text explaining the project, a virtual experience that can be accessed for free online, and additional complementary programming (i.e. videos, written pieces, events, etc.) that are created by each hosting partner in order to contextualize the subject within their community setting.

== HT94: Virtual Exhibition ==
"Hostile Terrain 94: Virtual Exhibition" is an interactive documentary experience that pairs with HT94's physical installations. The experience, which can be accessed by anyone with an iOS or Android device, contains five chapters where viewers can hear first-hand accounts from migrants and humanitarian volunteers, represented by archival photos and volumetric captures, hologram-like videos.

Viewers can navigate through the digital experience by selecting chapters from an interactive map, clicking through 360° environments, and exploring 3-D models of real-life items left behind by migrants and found in the Sonoran Desert.

At the end of the experience, viewers have an opportunity to add their voices to a memorial to the thousands who have died crossing the desert.

== Undocumented Migration Project ==
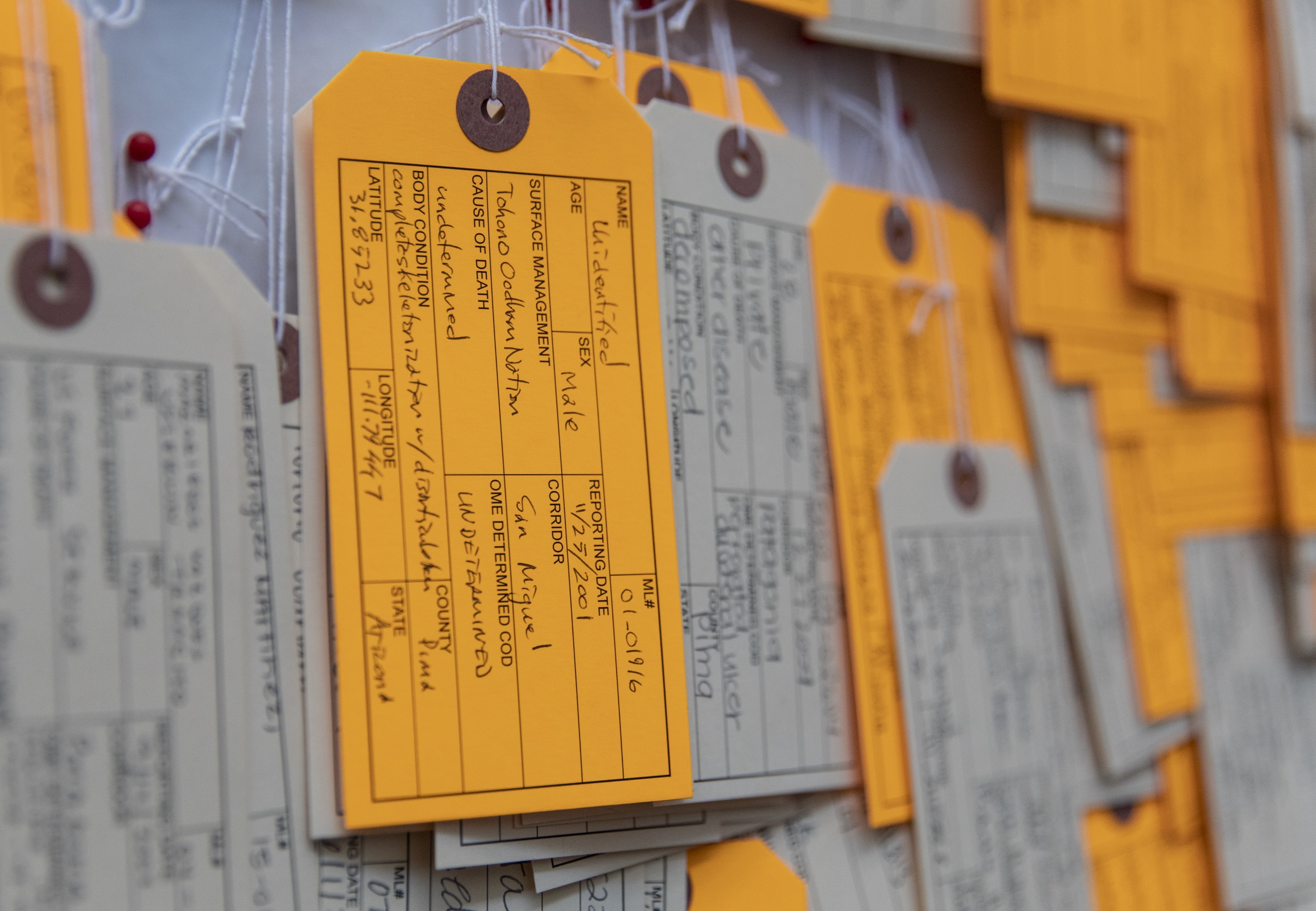
4,200 toe tags hang from the HT94 wall, representing people who have died while crossing the U.S./Mexico Border in Southern Arizona.

The Undocumented Migration Project (UMP) is an internationally-known research-education-art collective founded by Jason De León in 2009. The work of the UMP has been featured in numerous academic publications, documentary features, and popular media outlets including The New York Times, RadioLab, and the BBC. De León is professor of Anthropology and Chicana/o Studies at UCLA. He is the author of the award-winning book "The Land of Open Graves: Living and Dying on the Migrant Trail" (UC Press 2015), co-curator of the exhibition "State of Exception/Estado de Excepción," a National Geographic Emerging Explorer (2013), and a 2017 MacArthur Foundation Fellow. The pop-up installation "Hostile Terrain" is based on the multi-media exhibition of the same name co-produced by Michael Wells and Lucy Cahill.

The work of the UMP is also highlighted in the documentary feature film, "Border South."

All of the data used in Hostile Terrain 94 has been provided by Humane Borders, an organization based out of Tucson, Arizona.

== See also ==
- Jason De León
- The Land of Open Graves: Living and Dying on the Migrant Trail
