= One Leg on Earth =

Novel by Nigerian author Pemi Aguda

- First edition cover
- Author: 'Pemi Aguda
- Audio read by: Délé Ogundiran
- Language: English
- Genre: Literary fiction, horror, speculative
- Publisher: W. W. Norton & Company
- Publication date: May 5, 2026
- Media type: Print (hardcover), audiobook, ebook
- Pages: 240 (hardcover)
- ISBN: 978-1-324-06587-6 (hardcover)
- Preceded by: Ghostroots

One Leg on Earth is the debut novel by Nigerian author 'Pemi Aguda. It was published on May 5, 2026, by W. W. Norton & Company in the United States and by Virago (an imprint of Little, Brown) in the United Kingdom. The book blends literary fiction, horror, and speculative elements to tell the story of a young woman navigating an unexpected pregnancy during a mysterious wave of suicides among expectant mothers in Lagos.

== Plot ==
The novel follows Yosoye Bakare, a 23‑year‑old mass communications graduate from Ibadan who is assigned to an architectural firm in Lagos for her mandatory year of the National Youth Service Corps. The firm is developing Omi City, a controversial luxury enclave built on land reclaimed from the Atlantic Ocean. After a casual sexual encounter, Yosoye discovers that she is pregnant. Although the timing is precarious she is isolated, low in the office hierarchy, and worried about her professional prospects, she decides to keep the child. At the same time, a disturbing pattern has emerged across the city: pregnant women are walking into open water and drowning.

As construction on Omi City accelerates, Yosoye begins to suspect a connection between the reclamation project and the suicides. She is haunted by dreams and visions of the dead women, who beckon her toward the water. At work, a charismatic but unsettling figure named Beloved takes an interest in Yosoye and suggests that the suicides are acts of ultimate self‑possession rather than tragedy. The discovery of additional bodies along the coastline and the firm's attempt to suppress the news push Yosoye toward a psychological breaking point.

== Publication ==
The novel was published in hardcover and ebook on May 5, 2026, by W. W. Norton in the US. The UK trade paperback was issued by Virago on May 7, 2026. It is 192 pages (US hardcover) or 240 pages (UK paperback) depending on the edition. An audiobook version, narrated by a yet‑unannounced reader, was also released.

== Reception ==
The novel received mostly positive reviews. Publishers Weekly, in a starred review, called it "marvelous" and "unforgettable," praising Aguda's "clear‑eyed exploration of daughterhood, community, and the human costs of urban development". Kirkus Reviews described it as "a deft and confident first novel" that "balances the darkness here with light". The Guardian called Aguda "a virtuoso of dread and suspense" and noted that the novel splices "eco‑horror, cosmic distress and ideas of the monstrous feminine into a singularly nail‑biting experience". The NPR review highlighted the book's genre‑blending qualities, observing that it is simultaneously "horror, occult and supernatural, city life, and literary fiction".

Several reviewers commented on the novel's treatment of Lagos as a character in its own right. The Los Angeles Review of Books named the novel its Summer 2026 Book Club selection, calling it "an ambitious novel like no other: a coming‑of‑age story, an uncanny exploration of motherhood, and a chilling vision of the dark side of progress".

== Awards ==
The novel was selected as the May 2026 "Debut of the Month" by a major online bookseller and featured on Time magazine's list of the most anticipated books of 2026.
