= Gloria Mwaniga =

Kenyan writer, educator and columnist

- Born: Kenya
- Education: University of Nairobi
- Occupations: Writer and educator

Gloria Mwaniga is a Kenyan writer, educator and columnist for the Daily Nation and The EastAfrican. She is a graduate of the University of Nairobi and Chimamanda Ngozi Adichie’s Writing Workshop in Nigeria. In 2019, she was awarded a Miles Morland Writing Scholarship, and in 2022 her story "Boyi" was awarded the inaugural African Land Policy Centre Story Prize. Her story was subsequently included in Finding Ground and other stories: ALPC Anthology of short stories on Land in Africa. Her work has appeared in The Johannesburg Review of Books and The White Review.

== Bibliography ==
Selected book reviews

- "Young Nigerian Writer Serves a Twisted Tale in Debut Novel", review of The Day the Mad Man Knew by Babatunde Oyateru. Daily Nation, 11 May 2018.
- "Of Love, Losses and Seeking Answers in 'The Dragonfly Sea'", review of The Dragon Fly by Yvonne Adhiambo Owuor. The Daily Nation, 12 April 2019.
- "NoViolet Bulawayo Weaves a Great Yarn About Zimbabwe", review of We Need New Names by NoViolet Bulowayo. The Daily Nation, 30 December 2016.

Selected interviews with writers

- "Jackie Kay on Dual Identity and the Funny Side of Life”", interview with Jackie Kay. Daily Nation, 5 July 2020.
- "Jennifer Makumbi on Identity and How to Write About Home", interview with Jennifer Makumbi. Daily Nation, 5 July 2020.
- "Author Reveals the Agony of Being a Refugee at Dadaab", interview with Ben Rawlence. Daily Nation, 5 July 2020.
- "Effects of Slavery Still Present in Coast Region", interview with Joe Khamisi. Daily Nation, 5 July 2020.
- "Now is the Time to Write to the Heart of the Country", interview with Tony Mochama. Daily Nation, 5 July 2020.

Selected essays

- "Literary Graveyard That is the Modern Digital Platform". Daily Nation, 28 October 2016.
- "Online Literary Magazines Have Not Been Spared from Digital Turbulence". Daily Nation, 1 December 2018.
- "We Have a Violent Past, But We’re Being Forced to Forget It". Daily Nation, 1 July 2016.
- "Future Generations Will Blame Us for Ignoring Historical Sites". Daily Nation, 18 March 2016.
- "Why Your Skin Colour Could Decide How Much a Publisher Will Pay You". Daily Nation, 14 June 2020.
- "An Afternoon with Ngugi and the Questions I Wanted to Ask". Daily Nation, 16 February 2019.
- "Crowning moment as Kenyan author takes home Caine Prize". Daily Nation, 6 July 2018.

Selected short stories

- "Child's Play"
- "Boyi"
- "How Much Is That Doggie in the Window?"

== Awards ==
- Miles Morland Foundation Writing Scholarship
- The Goethe-Institut's Afro Young Adults Fiction Competition (shortlisted)
- Writivism Short Story Prize (shortlisted)
- African Land Policy Centre Story Prize (awarded)
