= Frances Ogamba =

Nigerian writer

Frances Ogamba is a Nigerian short story writer.

In 2019, Ogamba's nonfiction piece "The Valley of Memories", exploring the way in which a woman feels a bodily connection with her deceased uncle, won the Koffi Addo Prize for Creative Nonfiction. Her short story "Ghana Boy", centring on the relationship between a young boy and his gang leader elder brother, was also shortlisted for the 2019 Writivism Short Story Prize. In 2020, her story "My Husband's Wife" was the English-language winner of the inaugural Kalahari Short Story Prize.

Ogamba lives in Port Harcourt, where she works as a content developer.

== Awards ==
- 2025 Gulliver's Travel grant
- 2025 Horror Writers' Diversity Grant
- 2024 Miles Morland Scholarship
- 2024 Jacobson Scholarship from The Hawkinson Fund for Peace and Justice

== Works ==
- Call Her No One, Craft Literary
- To Have and To Hold The Hopkins Review, 2026 Spring Issue.
- Telepathy Channel Magazine.
- The Grit Born The Dark Magazine.
- The Valley of Memories, Afreecan Reads.
- The Tribute, YNaija, 2016.
- The Grandpa Whose Head was not Correct, great weather for Media.
- A review of The Valley of Memories, Arts and Africa, 20 May 2019.
- Ghana Boy, Munyori Literary Journal, 20 May 2019.
- Hues of Perfection, Jalada, 14 December 2019.
- Tree People, Rewrite Reads, Issue 1, November 2020.
- "My Husband's Wife", 2020.
- Love for Ashes, The Dark Magazine, 1 January 2021.
- Like Large Bodies of Light , Chestnut Review, February, 2021.
- Must Read Speculative Short Fiction for February 2021 TOR.COM, 2021.
- The Unearthing Temz Review
- Water Child The Dark Magazine, 1 May 2021.
- The Urn The Dark Magazine, 1 June 2021.
- Factory Baby Yabaleft Review, 24 July 2021.
- The Hide's Effect, The Dark Magazine, 1 October 2021.
- Under the Sentinel's Watch, Lolwe, November, 2021.
- The Kings Street Barbers, Dgeku, January 2022.
- On the Brink, Midnight & Indigo, March 2022.
- For Ibiso, Cinnabar Moth.
- Master of Ceremonies, The Dark Magazine, 1 May 2022.
- Reaching for Ijenu, New Orleans Review, Spring/Summer 2022
