= National Book Award =

American literary awards

- Logo of National Book Awards
- Sponsored by: U.S. books industry
- Date: November
- Hosted by: National Book Foundation
- First award: Original version: 1936–42 (1935–41 publications); new version: 1950 (1949 publications)
- Final award: Active
- Website: nationalbook.org

The National Book Awards (NBA) are a set of annual literary awards in the United States. At the final National Book Awards Ceremony every November, the National Book Foundation presents the National Book Awards and two lifetime achievement awards to authors. The National Book Awards were established in 1936 by the American Booksellers Association, abandoned during World War II, and re-established by three book industry organizations in 1950. Non-U.S. authors and publishers were eligible for the pre-war awards. Since then they are presented to American authors for books published in the United States roughly during the award year.

The nonprofit National Book Foundation was established in 1988 to administer and enhance the National Book Awards and "move beyond [them] into the fields of education and literacy", primarily by sponsoring public appearances by writers. Its stated mission is "to celebrate the best literature in America, expand its audience, and ensure that books have a prominent place in American culture."

In 2018, there were 1,637 books nominated for the five award categories, led by the Nonfiction category with 546 nominations. The 2018 ceremony was held on November 14 in New York City.

== Winners and finalists ==
- List of winners of the National Book Award.
- National Book Award for Fiction, winners and finalists.
- National Book Award for Nonfiction, winners and finalists.
- National Book Award for Poetry, winners and finalists.
- National Book Award for Translated Literature, winners and finalists.
- National Book Award for Young People's Literature, winners and finalists.

== Process ==
National Book Awards are given to one book (author) annually in each of five categories: fiction, nonfiction, poetry, translation, and young people's literature. There have previously been many other categories but they have been retired or subsumed in the existing five. The National Book Foundation also presents two lifetime achievement awards each year: the "Medal for Distinguished Contribution to American Letters" and the "Literarian Award for Outstanding Service to the American Literary Community".

Only publishers nominate books for the National Book Awards, but panelists may request particular nominations from publishers. Each panel comprises five judges, including writers, librarians, booksellers, and literary critics. In 2013, the judging panels were expanded to include experts in the literary field in addition to established writers.

Each panel considers hundreds of books each year in each of the five categories. In 2013, the Foundation announced the addition of a National Book Awards longlist—announced in September and consisting of ten titles per category—to precede the finalists list, announced in October and comprising five titles per category. The fifth category, the National Book Award for Translated Literature, was added in 2018, recognizing works in translation for the first time since 1983. At the National Book Awards Ceremony and Dinner held in New York City each November, the chair of each judging panel announces the winners of the year's National Book Awards. Each finalist receives $1,000, a medal, and a citation written by the judging panel; winners get $10,000 and a bronze sculpture.

== History ==
=== Pre-war awards by booksellers ===
The first National Book Awards were presented in May 1936 at the annual convention of the American Booksellers Association, one month after The New York Times reported institution of the "new annual award". The winners were authors of four 1935 books selected by a vote of ABA members. Virginia Kirkus chaired the central committee of seven including the ABA president, three bookshops, Publishers Weekly, and American News Company. Three were called "the most distinguished of 1935" (novel, biography, and general nonfiction) and one "the most original" (novel). Two of the books were advertised by their publishers as "The most distinguished autobiography of 1935" and "The most distinguished general non-fiction book of 1935" in NYTimes on May 12, the same day that the newspaper reported yesterday's awards. (Note: Both on page 21: Vincent Sheean's autobiography Personal History advertised by Doubleday, Doran; Anne Morrow Lindbergh's North to the Orient advertised by Harcourt, Brace & Co. By 1937/38, if not earlier, there would be "National Book Award Editions" of some books.)

For the next six years, 1937 to 1942, the awards were announced from mid-February to early March.

The "Most Distinguished" Nonfiction, Biography, and Novel (for 1935 and 1936) were reduced to two and termed "Favorite" Nonfiction and Fiction beginning 1937. Master of ceremonies Clifton Fadiman declined to consider the Pulitzer Prizes (not yet announced in February 1938) as potential ratifications. "Unlike the Pulitzer Prize committee, the booksellers merely vote for their favorite books. They do not say it is the best book or the one that will elevate the standard of manhood or womanhood. Twenty years from now we can decide which are the masterpieces. This year we can only decide which books we enjoyed reading the most."

The Bookseller Discovery officially recognized "outstanding merit which failed to receive adequate sales and recognition" (quoted by NYT) Finally that award stood alone for 1941 and the New York Times frankly called it "a sort of consolation prize that the booksellers hope will draw attention to his work."

The winning authors and books were selected by a nationwide poll of booksellers (ABA members); during the 1937/38 cycle, ballots were received from 319 stores, triple the number who voted in the first rendition early in 1936. In a 1941 advertisement, the Booksellers described the "significance of the awards" thus:

In effect, his ballot says, "Of all the books of the year these are the three I enjoyed most – in two ways! I enjoyed reading them; and I enjoyed selling them." And that to a bookseller means people who, on his recommendation, read and enjoyed – and sent in other people who also read and enjoyed. The National Book Awards give you perhaps a greater guarantee of reading pleasure than any other literary prizes.

=== Reestablished by the book industry ===
In January 1950 three book industry organizations announced that "works by Americans published here" would be recognized by three awards in March (at the annual convention?). There would be three distinct panels of five judges. The fifteen judges were "Elmer Davis, John Kieran, Henry Steele Commager, Fairfield Osborn and Norman Cousins for non-fiction; Mary Colum, Glenway Wescott, Max Gissin, W. G. Rogers and Malcolm Cowley for fiction; and W. H. Auden, Louise Bogan, Babett Duetsch, Horace Gregory and Louise Untermeyer for poetry."

The awards were administered by the National Book Committee from 1950 to 1974, when the Committee disbanded after publishers withdrew support.

In 1950 and 1967, at least, the prize sponsors were three book-industry organizations American Booksellers Association, the American Book Publishers Council and the Book Manufacturers Institute.

In 1973 NYTimes still called the National Book Committee a nonprofit funded "by publishers and by organizations involved in the book trade" A temporary Committee on Awards Policy handled 1975.

=== New categories and split awards ===
In 1964 Nonfiction was divided in three. The National Book Award for Translation was introduced in 1967 and split between two books, the first split.

Children's literature was first recognized as one of seven categories in 1969. Two awards were split in 1973 for the first time.

Publishers dropped their support after 1974 and the National Book Committee was disbanded. In 1975 the temporary administrator "begged" judges not to split awards.

Three of 27 awards were split in 1983 before the drastic cutback that also required selection of a single winner in all three categories for 1984.

The currently active Poetry category was added in 1991, followed by Young People's Literature in 1996, and Translated Literature in 2018.

=== "American Book Awards" ===
In 1980 the "National Book Awards" were canceled and replaced by "American Book Awards" on the film industry model (Oscars). "It will be run almost exactly the way the Academy Awards are run," a spokesman told reporters." There would be nearly 30 awards presented in an extravagant TV-friendly ceremony, to winners selected by a standing "academy" of more than 2,000 people in the book industry. Implementation was poor, the episode a disaster.

Most new categories survived only one to four cycles, 1980 to 1983. There were seven awards categories in 1979, twenty-eight in 1980, nineteen in 1983 (plus graphics awards, see below), three in 1984.

In 1983 there were 30 award winners in 27 categories including 14 categories of literary achievement in writing for adults; in turn, five for hardcover editions, six for paperback editions, and three general.

1983 awards categories (27)

- 8 for graphics: Pictorial Design, Typographical Design, Illustration Collected Art, Illustration Original Art, Illustration Photographs, Cover Design, Jacket Design (Note: Only seven graphics awards are listed here, as in the contemporary source. Multiple sources say 27 and 19.)
- 5 for children's literature: (Children's) Fiction hardcover and paperback, Nonfiction, Picture Books hardcover and paperback
- 14 for adults' literature: General Nonfiction hardcover and paperback, History hardcover and paperback, Biography hardcover and paperback, Science hardcover and paperback, Translation, Fiction hardcover and paperback, Poetry, First Novel, Original Paperback

Late that year, the AAP Board voted to fund a new version of the Awards, which had been "close to expiring from lack of support". At the time, AAP and Harper & Row president Brooks Thomas anticipated "probably fewer than ten" categories, including some "only for original paperbacks, not reprints". Edwin McDowell reported that "many book-industry officials hope ... [to] rank in importance with the $15,000 Booker McConnell Prize for Fiction" (British).

For 1983 publications (January to October) there would be no awards. A committee comprising American Book Awards executive director Barbara Prete and four publishers designed the new and improved program, implemented fall 1984 for a publication year beginning November 1983. They cut the roster to merely three (Nonfiction, Fiction, and First Work of Fiction), moved the ceremony from early spring to late fall, and redefined eligibility to require publication during the calendar year of the awards (roughly, see Annual eligibility). There were only fiction and nonfiction awards in 1986.

=== 1987—present ===
In 1987 the "National" award returned in name. Covering the November ceremony, Edwin McDowell of The New York Times remarked upon the recurring changes in format and contrasted 1983 in particular, when there were 96 finalists in 27 awards categories (listed above).

The surviving awards for general Fiction and Nonfiction, now with precisely five finalists each, were administered by National Book Awards, Inc., whose Chairman of the Board was the president of Hearst Trade Book Group. He declaimed that "Book people are really not actors, and there's a realization now that we should not try to reward things like who did the best book blurb." The fixed number five finalists was retained through 2012, while the number of book categories has doubled with the addition of Poetry in 1991 and Young People's Literature in 1996. Beginning with 2013, the Foundation announced there would be a "longlist" of 10 titles in each of the four categories in September (40 titles), followed by a "finalist" list of 5 titles in October (20 titles), and then the winners in November (4 titles). In 2018 a fifth award category was announced, the National Book Award for Translated Literature. It is for living translators and authors and for fiction and non-fiction. The foundation previously gave a translation award from 1967-1983, but did not require the author to be living and was for fiction only.

In 2024, the National Book Foundation announced the awards would no longer require U.S. citizenship for eligibility, following a similar decision the Pulitzer Prizes had made in 2023.

== Annual eligibility ==
A book must be published "between December 1 of the previous year and November 30 of the current year" to be eligible. Its publisher must complete a nomination in the spring and mail copies to the panelists. The panelists read all the valid nominees during this time, and the panels compile shortlists in September.

The pre-war awards were announced in the winter, usually February, and described with reference to the year of publication, if any; for example, "National Book Awards for 1939" announced February 1940. The 1950 to 1983 awards, as the National Book Foundation labeled them, were presented in the spring to works published during the preceding calendar year. Since 1984 the NBA have been presented in the fall, usually November, to books published roughly during the calendar year (December of the previous year through November).

== Medal for Distinguished Contribution (lifetime) ==
The Medal for Distinguished Contribution to American Letters is a lifetime achievement award presented by the Foundation at the final ceremony for the Book Awards. The medal comes with a cash prize of $10,000. It recognizes someone who "has enriched [American] literary heritage over a life of service, or a corpus of work."

- 1988: Jason Epstein
- 1989: Daniel Boorstin
- 1990: Saul Bellow
- 1991: Eudora Welty
- 1992: James Laughlin
- 1993: Clifton Fadiman
- 1994: Gwendolyn Brooks
- 1995: David McCullough
- 1996: Toni Morrison
- 1997: Studs Terkel
- 1998: John Updike
- 1999: Oprah Winfrey
- 2000: Ray Bradbury
- 2001: Arthur Miller
- 2002: Philip Roth
- 2003: Stephen King
- 2004: Judy Blume
- 2005: Norman Mailer
- 2006: Adrienne Rich
- 2007: Joan Didion
- 2008: Maxine Hong Kingston
- 2009: Gore Vidal
- 2010: Tom Wolfe
- 2011: John Ashbery
- 2012: Elmore Leonard
- 2013: E. L. Doctorow
- 2014: Ursula Le Guin
- 2015: Don DeLillo
- 2016: Robert Caro
- 2017: E. Annie Proulx
- 2018: Isabel Allende
- 2019: Edmund White
- 2020: Walter Mosley
- 2021: Karen Tei Yamashita
- 2022: Art Spiegelman
- 2023: Rita Dove
- 2024: Barbara Kingsolver
- 2025: George Saunders
- 2026: Salman Rushdie

Five of the seventeen medalists through 2004 were previous National Book Award winners (Bellow, Welty, McCullough, Updike, and Roth, all but McCullough for fiction). Between 2005 and 2018, all of the medalists except Leonard and Allende have been previous National Book Award winners.

== Literarian Award for Outstanding Service (lifetime) ==
The Literarian Award for Outstanding Service to the American Literary Community is a lifetime achievement award presented by the Foundation annually from 2005. It recognizes "an individual for outstanding service to the American literary community, whose life and work exemplify the goals of the National Book Foundation to expand the audience for literature and to enhance the cultural value of literature in America."

- 2005: Lawrence Ferlinghetti
- 2006: Robert B. Silvers and Barbara Epstein
- 2007: Terry Gross
- 2008: Barney Rosset
- 2009: Dave Eggers
- 2010: Joan Ganz Cooney
- 2011: Mitchell Kaplan
- 2012: Arthur Sulzberger Jr.
- 2013: Maya Angelou
- 2014: Kyle Zimmer
- 2015: James Patterson
- 2016: Cave Canem Foundation
- 2017: Richard Robinson
- 2018: Doron Weber
- 2019: Oren J. Teicher
- 2020: Carolyn Reidy
- 2021: Nancy Pearl
- 2022: Tracie D. Hall
- 2023: Paul Yamazaki
- 2024: Paul Coates
- 2025: Roxane Gay
- 2026: Perri Klass

== See also ==
- Pulitzer Prize
- American Book Awards
- Booker Prize
- Gelett Burgess Children's Book Awards
- Commonwealth Writers Prize
- Prix Goncourt
- Costa Book Awards, formerly the Whitbread Book Awards
- Governor General's Award
- Literary festival
- Innovations in Reading Prize
- 2024 National Book Awards
