= Writivism Short Story Prize =

Annual literary awards

The Writivism Short Story Prize and Koffi Addo Prize for Creative Nonfiction are a pair of annual literary awards for work by emerging writers living in Africa. The Writivism Short Story Prize, for short fiction, was established in 2013. The Koffi Addo Prize for Creative Nonfiction was established in 2016.

In 2016, the Koffi Addo Writivism Prize for Creative Nonfiction was established, organised by the Center for African Cultural Excellence (CACE). In its first year the Koffi Addo Prize was only open to Ghanaians, but in subsequent years it was open to any writer from the African continent.

== Winners of the Writivism Short Story Prize ==
Year	Winning Author	Winning Title	Also shortlisted
2013	Anthea Paelo (Uganda)	"Picture Frames"	Nassanga Rashidah Sarah, "The Sidewalk"; Kathryn Kazibwe, "Together"; Emmeline Bisiikwa, "The Shadow"; Paul Kisakye, "Emotional Roller Coaster"
2014	Saaleha Idrees Bamjee (South Africa)	"Out of the Blue"	Wise Nzikie Ngasa (Cameroon), "Devils"; Saaleha Bhamjee, "Lunatic"; Kelechi Njoku (Nigeria), "Survived By"; Ssekandi Ronald Sseguja (Uganda), "Walls and Borders"
2015	Pemi Aguda (Nigeria)	"Caterer, Caterer"	Adeola Opeyemi (Nigeria), "Being a Man"; Dayo Adewunmi Ntwari (Rwanda), "Devil's Village"; Saaleha Bhamjee (South Africa), "Dream"; Jane Kalu (Nigeria), "Social Studies"
2016	Acan Innocent Immaculate (Uganda)	"SunDown"	Gloria Mwaniga Odary (Kenya), "Boyi"; Laure Gnagbé Blédou (Ivory Coast), "Je ne suis pas rentree" Abu Amirah (Kenya), "The Swahilification of Mutembei"; Aito Osemegbe Joseph (Nigeria), "The List"
2017	Munachim Amah (Nigeria)	"Stolen Pieces"	Saaleha Bhamjee (South Africa), "Fairies"; Régine Gwladys Lebouda (Cameroon), "Mobache"; Andrew C. Dakalira (Malawi), "The (Un)Lucky Ones"; Blessing J. Christopher (Nigeria), "This Story Has No End"
2018	Mbogo Ireri (Kenya)	"Hopes and Dreams"	Mali Kambandu (Zambia), "A Photograph"; Obinna Jones (Nigeria), "A River Ends in an Ocean"
2019	Resoketswe Manenzhe (South Africa)	"Maserumo"	Frances Ogamba (Nigeria), "Ghana Boy"; Vuyelwa Maluleke (South Africa), "Tale"

== Winners of the Koffi Addo Prize for Creative Nonfiction ==
Year	Winning Author	Winning Title	Also shortlisted
2016	Yvette Tetteh (Ghana)	Lost Futures, or A Guide to Losing Love	Ama Asantewa Diaka (Ghana), Missing Wombs; Kofi Konadu Berko (Ghana), Another One of Those
2017	Charles King (South Africa)	Meat Bomb	Vivian Uchechi Ogbonna (Nigeria), A Long Way From Home; Sada Malumfashi (Nigeria), Finding Binyavanga
2018	Chisanga Mukuka (Zambia)	Belonging	Ope Adedeji (Nigeria), Women Who Bleed Colours; Karis Onyemenam (Nigeria), The Child and its Many Faces
2019	Frances Ogamba (Nigeria)	The Valley of Memories	KÁNYIN Olorunnisola (Nigeria), The Comedian; Eugene Yakubu (Nigeria), How to Wear Your Body
