= American Treasures =

American Treasures is a reality television show on Discovery Channel. The series premiered on February 22, 2011 and features archaeology professors Jason De León and Kirk French, who often receive inquiries from everyday Americans who think they possess items that may have historical significance.

== Cast ==
- Jason De León, professor at the University of Michigan
- Kirk French, professor at Pennsylvania State University

== Episodes ==
No.	Title	Original release date
1	"Guns and Moonshiners"	February 22, 2011
2	"Bullets and Bloodsuckers"	March 1, 2011
3	"Ladies' Big Easy Legends"	March 8, 2011

== See also ==
- American Pickers
- Pawn Stars
