= Soldiers and Kings =

2024 book by Jason De León

Soldiers and Kings: Survival and Hope in the World of Human Smuggling
- Author: Jason De León
- Publisher: Viking Press
- Publication date: March 19, 2024
- Pages: 400
- ISBN: 978-0593298589
- Preceded by: The Land of Open Graves

Soldiers and Kings: Survival and Hope in the World of Human Smuggling is a 2024 book by Jason De León, published by Viking Press. It won the 2024 National Book Award for Nonfiction.

== Contents and background ==
De León, a professor of anthropology at the University of California, Los Angeles and also the founder of the Undocumented Migration Project, conducted ethnographic research across Mexico for seven years to learn more about and speak with smugglers who moved migrants through the country, specifically in a post-Programa Frontera Sur landscape. Among other locations, De León's investigation happened in Chiapas, on the border of Guatemala, where many smugglers operate in order to move migrants along the dangerous, treacherous path from Honduras to the United States.

== Critical reception ==
In a starred review, Publishers Weekly lauded the strength of De León's researched, empirical account of the smuggler trade, specifically pointing out his "fluid storytelling", the book's "gut-wrenching finish", and De León's critique at the lack of empathy received for his work by academia. Also in a starred review, Kirkus Reviews called the book "An exemplary ethnography of central importance to any discussion of immigration policy or reform." In a third starred review, Library Journal stated that "De León vividly depicts how both groups are part and parcel of a dangerous global industry in pursuit of greater economic opportunity."

Jennifer Szalai, for the New York Times, lauded De León for the nuance and transparency he showed to the reality of immigration, as well as his skillful synthesis of oral history resulting from his ethnographic research. Szalai in particular highlighted the candidness of De León's testimonies: "his subjects start to trust him and begin to reveal themselves—no small feat, considering that suspicion and mistrust are a matter of professional (and physical) survival."

Christian Century called the book "a haunting and humane portrait of those surviving amid harsh immigration policies that have exacerbated the precarity of migrant life." The reviewer considered it a logical sequel to De León's previous book, The Land of Open Graves: Living and Dying on the Migrant Trail, which interrogates how American policies regarding immigration causes undue death and suffering to immigrants in the Southwestern United States. The reviewer concluded: "The stories of the guides made me cry at their immense suffering, laugh at their playful jokes, rage at the injustice they face, and feel inspired by their will to survive." Time called the book one of the 100 must-reads of 2024, stating "Soldiers and Kings seeks to buck the dangerous stereotypes that are often associated with migrants and smugglers, and instead, shows their fully nuanced stories."
