= Whiskey Tender =

2024 memoir by Deborah Jackson Taffa

Whiskey Tender: A Memoir
- Author: Deborah Jackson Taffa
- Publisher: Harper
- Publication date: February 27, 2024
- Pages: 304
- ISBN: 978-0063288515

Whiskey Tender: A Memoir is a 2024 memoir by Deborah Jackson Taffa, the director at the MFA in Creative Writing program at the Institute of American Indian Arts, published by Harper. It was a finalist for the 2024 National Book Award for Nonfiction.

== Contents and background ==
The book follows Taffa's upbringing and traces the context within which she grew up. Her grandparents were members of the Quechan Nation and Laguna Pueblo Tribe and were both forced to go to American Indian boarding schools; her parents similarly were forced to undergo assimilation through government job program. Taffa, born on the Fort Yuma Indian Reservation and raised in New Mexico, endured both discrimination from white people for her Indigenous background but also, at times, felt like she wasn't "Native" enough. Spanning both history and Taffa's own childhood and adulthood, the book blends moments from Taffa's reservation with broader themes and arguments about indigeneity, colonialism, assimilation, activism, and power structures, among others.

The title Whiskey Tender is, according to Taffa, a "high-low juxtaposition" in which the multiply defined "tender" is put adjacent to "whiskey," a liquor historically traded for goods. Taffa stated that "tender" would complicate and offset "whiskey," thus serving as a means to call attention to, deconstruct, and ultimately supplant Indigenous stereotypes.

In an interview for PEN America, Taffa stated, regarding the underrepresentation of Indigenous people in the memoir genre:

"To make peace with writing a memoir, I had to acknowledge the genre as political. I could only share my family’s trauma if I told it in context, reminding readers that my elders struggled, not because of a moral failure on their part, but because of societal and governmental pressures. By speaking about actual events, and writing about hidden histories, I hope the book serves as an indictment of what America did to us, and continues to do to us, to this day."

== Critical reception ==
In a starred review, Publishers Weekly said "What makes Taffa’s version exceptional is her visceral prose and sharp attunement to the tragedies of assimilation. This is a must-read." Kirkus Reviews called it "A searching and perceptive Native memoir" with diligent research that, to the reviewer, sometimes overwhelmed the more emotional resonances of Taffa's personal story. Also in a starred review, Booklist stated "The result of a lifetime, Taffa’s remarkable debut stands out from other contemporary memoirs and Native American literature."

Critics observed Taffa's ability to combine the personal and the universal. For the Washington Post, Kristen Martin was particularly impressed at Taffa's "textured prose and gift for storytelling", especially for a first book. Martin lauded Taffa's ability to connect her personal story to larger themes of race, history, and family, ultimately concluding that "Taffa’s story is in fact distinctly American, full stop, and one that a country afraid of its own history needs to hear." A briefly noted review in the New Yorker similarly stated that "In her account, Taffa regards the broad tapestry of history and picks at its smallest threads: individual choices shaped by violent social forces, and by the sometimes erratic powers of love." The Los Angeles Times pointed out the strength of Taffa's outrage on behalf of her people and history but also the simultaneous strength of her optimism for change.

Time called the book one of the 100 must-reads of 2024, stating "With humor and heart, she traces her complicated adolescence, weaving in Native American history that sheds a light on the injustices Indigenous people have faced in both the past and the present."
