= Pemi Aguda =

Nigerian writer and architect

'Pemi Aguda
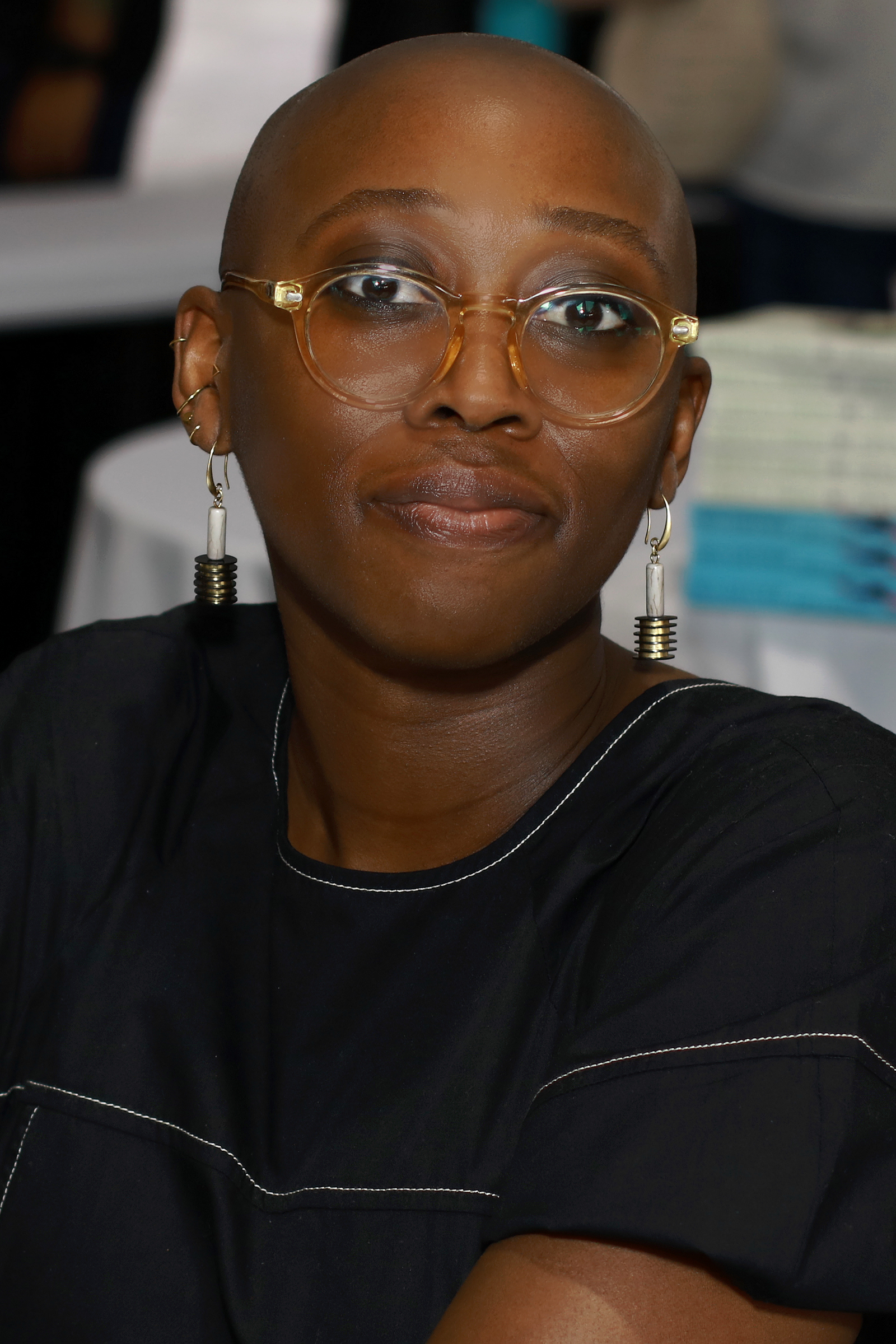
- Aguda at the 2024 Texas Book Festival
- Born: Lagos, Nigeria
- Education: University of Michigan (MFA)
- Known for: Ghostroots (2024)
- Awards: Writivism Short Story Prize (2015); O. Henry Award (2022, 2023)
- Website: pemiaguda.com

'Pemi Aguda is a Nigerian writer known for her short stories and debut collection Ghostroots (2024). Her work often explores complex themes surrounding motherhood, identity, and the supernatural. Ghostroots, which includes previously published stories such as "Breastmilk" and "The Hollow", was a finalist for the 2024 National Book Award for Fiction and received critical acclaim for its unifying themes and narrative cohesion.

Aguda's stories have been widely recognized, earning multiple accolades, including an O. Henry Award in 2022 for "Breastmilk" and again in 2023 for "The Hollow". Additionally, "Breastmilk" was shortlisted for the 2024 Caine Prize for African Writing. In 2026, she published One Leg on Earth, an earlier version of which won the 2020 Deborah Rogers Foundation Award.

== Education and fellowships ==
'Pemi Aguda is from Lagos, Nigeria, where she used to work in architecture.

In 2015, she won the Writivism Short Story Prize and became the recipient of the first Writivism Stellenbosch University writing residency. She holds an MFA in fiction from the University of Michigan's Helen Zell Writers' Program, where she won a Henfield Prize, a Tyson Prize, and several Hopwood Awards.

A graduate of the 2019 Clarion Workshop, Aguda's work was supported by an Octavia E. Butler Memorial Scholarship. She also received a scholarship from the Juniper Summer Workshop (where she is now a faculty member in fiction) and an Aspen Words Emerging Writer Fellowship in 2020. She was a 2021 Miami Book Fair Fiction Fellow, a 2022 MacDowell Fellow in Literature, and a 2023 James Merrill House Writer in Residence.

== Career ==
Aguda is known for short stories that often deal with the complexities of balancing motherhood (or fatherhood) between valor and oppression. The stories are wrapped in supernatural scenarios of literal hauntings or otherwise feature characters having haunting concerns that consume them, and each is normally connected in some way to the discussion of motherhood or womanhood as "a haunting and an inheritance".

There is a sense, amidst the magic, that mothers are doomed to fail. The world is full of dangers, and a mother can either smother or leave, and neither will do. Daughters can escape or stay, but the world very well might blame them either way.
— Leah Rachel von Essen, Chicago Review of Books, on the short stories of Ghostroots

In a discussion with Marris Adikwu on Interview, Aguda explained her ethos on and interpretation of storytelling as a type of expression of what haunts people, saying "almost every story could be read as a haunted story. As much as we're haunted by ghosts or our ancestors or evil, we're haunted by memory, too. We are haunted by repressed emotions [or] by the decisions that we don't make." The recurring themes of literal and figurative haunting throughout her works culminated in the release of a debut short story collection.

In May 2024, W. W. Norton published this debut short story collection, Ghostroots. It contains previously published award-winning content – such as "Breastmilk" and "The Hollow" – and was a finalist for the National Book Award for Fiction. The unifying themes of these short stories helped to establish cohesion. Critics by and large viewed it as a strong short story collection and debut, though they were split on reception to some of the stories, such as "Birdwoman". It was also listed on the New York Times 100 Notable Books of 2024.

She is currently the Hortense Spillers Assistant Editor at Transition Magazine.

Aguda's debut novel, One Leg on Earth, was published on May 5, 2026 from W. W. Norton & Company. The novel was listed as one of Literary Hub and TIME Magazine's "Most Anticipated Books of 2026." It is one of Esquire's "The Best Books of 2026."

== Personal life ==
Aguda lives in Philadelphia, Pennsylvania.

== Awards ==
Year	Title	Award	Category	Result	Ref
2015	"Caterer, Caterer"	Writivism Short Story Prize	Short Fiction	Won	
2020	The Suicide Mothers early draft	Deborah Rogers Foundation Award	—	Won	
2022	"Breastmilk"	O. Henry Award	—	Won	
2022	"Masquerade Season"	Nommo Award	Short Story	Won	
2023	"The Hollow"	O. Henry Award	—	Won	
2024	"Breastmilk"	Caine Prize	—	Shortlisted	
2024	Ghostroots	Los Angeles Times Book Prize	Art Seidenbaum Award	Finalist	
2024	Ghostroots	National Book Award	Fiction	Finalist	
2025	Ghostroots	PEN/Faulkner Award for Fiction	—	Finalist	
2025	Ghostroots	Young Lions Fiction Award	—	Finalist	

== Select bibliography ==
=== Collections ===
- —— (2024). Ghostroots (hardcover 1st ed.). New York: W. W. Norton & Company. ISBN 9781324065852.

=== Novels ===
- —— (2026). One Leg on Earth (hardcover 1st ed.). Little, Brown. ISBN 9780349018270.

=== Anthologies ===
- These Words Expose Us. CreateSpace. 2014. ISBN 9781500207175.
- Lagos Noir. Cassava Republic Press. 2018. ISBN 9781911115731.
- The Best American Science Fiction and Fantasy 2025. Mariner Books. 2025. ISBN 9780063441477.
