= The Land of Open Graves =

Book by anthropologist Jason De León

- First edition hardback cover
- Author: Jason De León
- Language: English
- Genre: Ethnography
- Publisher: University of California Press
- Publication date: 2015
- Publication place: United States
- Media type: Print (hardcover and paperback)
- Pages: 358
- ISBN: 0520282752
- OCLC: 908448301

The Land of Open Graves is a book by anthropologist Jason De León with photographs by Michael Wells. The book examines the human consequences of United States immigration policy. Using research methods from all four subfields of anthropology, De León sheds light on the lives (and deaths) of the thousands of migrants who cross the US border with Mexico daily in the Sonoran Desert of Arizona. The book was published in hardcover and paperback by the University of California Press in 2015 as part of the California Series in Public Anthropology.

== Summary ==
Jason De León details the effects of U.S. border control policy through stories of suffering and struggle. He discusses the hopes of migrants, the challenges they face as they attempt to cross the border, and the impact that these experiences have on the migrants both physically and psychologically. The book is broken out into three parts. Part One is the discussion of the border control policies and the dangers that come with attempting to cross the border. Part Two recalls the personal stories, journeys, and aftermath of immigrants who crossed the border. Part Three concludes the book and shows how the repercussions of successful and failed border crossing attempts extend far beyond the immigrant himself.

=== Part One: This Hard Land ===
In the first part of the book, De León discusses the steps that were taken to result in the system, "Prevention Through Deterrence," that is in place today to prevent migrants from coming into America. He also expands upon the ideas of the hybrid collectif and “Prevention Through Deterrence” by arguing that the United States deliberately funnels migrants through the Sonoran Desert so that various human and nonhuman actants do the “brutal work” for Border Patrol. He also uses the phrase bare life to describe those that have died and their death means nothing. This phrase is used to describe many migrants who lost their lives while attempting to cross. De León notes how there are very few posters set up in Mexico that inform migrants of the horrors they will come upon should they choose to attempt to cross. "Operation Blockade" was the very first stone to be thrown in the pond of preventing migrants from entering. Border Patrol knew that by having the only open area to cross be in the Sonoran Desert that there would be fewer attempts at crossing.

=== Part Two: El Camino ===
In part two he highlights his interactions and the accounts of several people, which includes that of Memo and Lucho's difficult journeys to the United States via the Sonora Desert. The accounts of Memo and Lucho are crucial to the entirety of the book because De León exerts the usage of actual voices of those who have experienced the monster known as the "desert hybrid collective." De León also describes the deportation process and takes distance from his personal expériences. He espouses his opposition to the Department of Homeland Security's former practices of "catch and release", which would lead to an immediate deportation of the migrants, to the one implemented since 2005 and usually referred to as Operation Streamline. He also follows a group of migrants who are deported back to Nogales following their hearing. They are brought to the Juan Bosco shelter where they will be able to spend a few nights.

Part two ends with Memo and Lucho successfully crossing the border and living in Arizona. They readily share their stories even though migrants settled in the US usually choose to forget their crossing experience due to the traumatic circumstances they may have faced in the desert and their illegal status. They are aware of the fragility of the history of border crossing, how migrants and the objects they leave behind are labeled "trash" and disposed of carelessly. De León uses the method Archaeology of the Contemporary to uncover and document the truth about conditions faced and the origins of those who have braved the Sonoran Desert. A crucial detail of the migrant process he discovers is the typology of layups, or break spots. A way to, “distinguish between sites where people camp for long periods, briefly rest, get picked up, practice religion, get arrested, and die.” This information brings clarity to the timing and location of events.

=== Part Three: Perilous Terrain ===
In part three De León examines how border crossings, both successful and failed, had an impact. De León and his colleagues discover the dead body of a female migrant that appears to have experienced necroviolence, which he states is the embodiment of what the Department of Homeland Security's "Prevention Through Deterrence" looks like. He discusses the more harrowing aspects of being anthropologists, and expresses the realities of practicing Anthropology, "directing a research project focused on human suffering and death in the desert means we can't ignore certain parts of the social process just because it sickens us or breaks our hearts." The body is identified as Maricela from Ecuador. The team gets in contact with Maricela's family, one of whom is a migrant living in Queens, New York, Christian. Christian explains that he never wanted Maricela to cross due to the difficulty and horrors that he faced both before, during, and after successfully crossing the border. De León and his colleagues also travel to meet Maricela's family in Ecuador and once there, her family members also state that they warned her against the attempt but that she left in hopes of providing a better life for her three children. De León concludes his book expressing his objective, which was to unveil the curtain that the US Government hides behind, known as "Prevention Through Deterrence", and its lasting after-effects.

== Theoretical ==
=== The Hybrid Collectif ===
Using Callon and Latour's approach of the Actor-Network theory, De León affirms that the American government's policy of Prevention Through Deterrence uses an assemblage of actants he nicknames the "hybrid collectif." This network contains a large set of human and non-human actants (the Desert itself, the heat, the scavenging animals, the smugglers and robbers, etc.) that hinder the migrants' attempt at border-crossing and facilitates death and disappearance. He argues that the United States deliberately takes advantage of the "dangerosity" of the hybrid collectif to deter migrants from crossing the border.

=== Necropolitics and Necroviolence ===
According to De León, the death of border-crossers is the result of what Achille Mbembe has described as Necropolitics. In other words, the American Government is using its sovereignty power to justify the death of migrants. He also develops the concept of Necroviolence to describe the mistreatment of bodies of migrants by the hybrid collectif. Although these practices of corporeal perversions have always been used to send a message to the living, he notices that the United States uses them as a utensil to deter people from attempting a perilous border-crossing.

== Critical reception ==
The Land of Open Graves has received both positive and negative reception since its release and garnered numerous awards including the 2016 Margaret Mead Award from the American Anthropological Association and from the Society for Applied Anthropology, the 2016 Book Prize from The Society for Latin American and Caribbean Anthropology, the 2017 Delmos Jones and Jagna Sharf Memorial Prize for the Critical Study of North America (Society for the Anthropology of North America), and the 2018 J.I. Staley Book Prize from the School for Advanced Research.

The book has been reviewed in The New York Times and the Times Literary Supplement. In an illustrated review for the New York Times, Kevin Pyle refers to De León's work as an "unnamed hybrid genre" rather than an "academic treatise". To characterize the landscape as a "weaponized" actor within the "Prevention Through Deterence" border policy, Pyle notes that De León uses "critical theory". He also notes that the "extensive first person interviews" is where the "heart of the book" lies. Pyle mentions that the narratives within the book help De León present "rich stories" of the survivors as well as those that didn't make it.

Joseph Nevins wrote a largely positive review of the work, but raised two criticisms. He took strong issue with De León's “shocking decision to buy and execute five pigs to understand what happens to human corpses when they are exposed to the elements of the desert.” Nevins also criticized De León's final statements regarding the broad apparatus of exclusion, in which the author stated that there is “no easy solution” to the issue, while saying his intent of the book was “never about solving our problem of illegal immigration.” Nevins’ critiqued De Leon's practice of “unauthorized mobility delimiting the range of solutions, which one defines as a predicament informing analysis and thus possible responses.”

Writing for the University of Oxford, Andrew Roesch-Knapp critiqued the book's strong language and poor reproduction of photographs, but ultimately praised De León's thesis of desert geography being used for immigration enforcement and concluded that "the book provides a scathing, holistic critique of American immigration policy." In a review published by Rutgers University, Susan Bibler Coutin also noted the questionable ethics of De León's research and his coverage of uncomfortable topics, but ultimately praised the book for "the degree to which De León introduces readers to a world that they likely either do not know or wish they could forget."

In 2017, De León received the prestigious MacArthur "Genius Grant" from the John D. and Catherine T. MacArthur Foundation.

== Photographs ==
A majority of the photographs displayed in the book were captured by Michael Wells, a good friend of De León. Working as collaborators, they compiled materials for his ethnography with the intention to publicize migrant narratives and present new data on the detrimental effects of Prevention Through Deterrence. The main demonstration of this was featured in chapter 8. Revisiting a familiar trail with his students, De León stumbled upon a dead female migrant at the coordinates BK-5N31” 44’ 55”, WIII 12’ 24”. It was concluded that she died of dehydration and exhaustion; De León took record of this and photos of her body for his research. The body was later identified as Carmita Maricela Zhagüi Puyas, an Ecuadorian native.

People later criticized De León for his documentation of Maricela, saying the photos “robbed her of her dignity”. De León countered with the assertion that the tragic deaths of migrants should cease to be hidden. He said, “This invisibility is a crucial part of both the suffering and the necroviolence that emerge from the hybrid collectif”, the hybrid collectif being the harsh environment of the Sonoran desert, the smugglers, and border patrol. Marisela's brother-in-law Christian backed him by saying,

“I want you to put photos that show our reality. That is better…The realness. That way people will believe what is happening. That they will know that this is the truth. A lot of people think it’s all a lie. That this stuff doesn’t happen.

Michael Wells captured mundane aspects of the border crossing experience as well, and Memo and Lucho contributed to this with pictures of them from throughout their journey. In one, they lay by a tree to rest because they are too exhausted to continue. Then they are playfully taking selfies in front of cattle because starvation momentarily drove them mad. These images and that of the simple “ambiguous” construction of a migrant shelter, a canyon filled with discarded worn out backpacks or a shoe held together by a bra strap give subtle evidence of the trials and tribulations migrants are forced to endure. What De León says is the, “phenomenology of suffering shared by many.”
