= Bothayna El Essa =

Kuwaiti writer

- بثينة العيسى
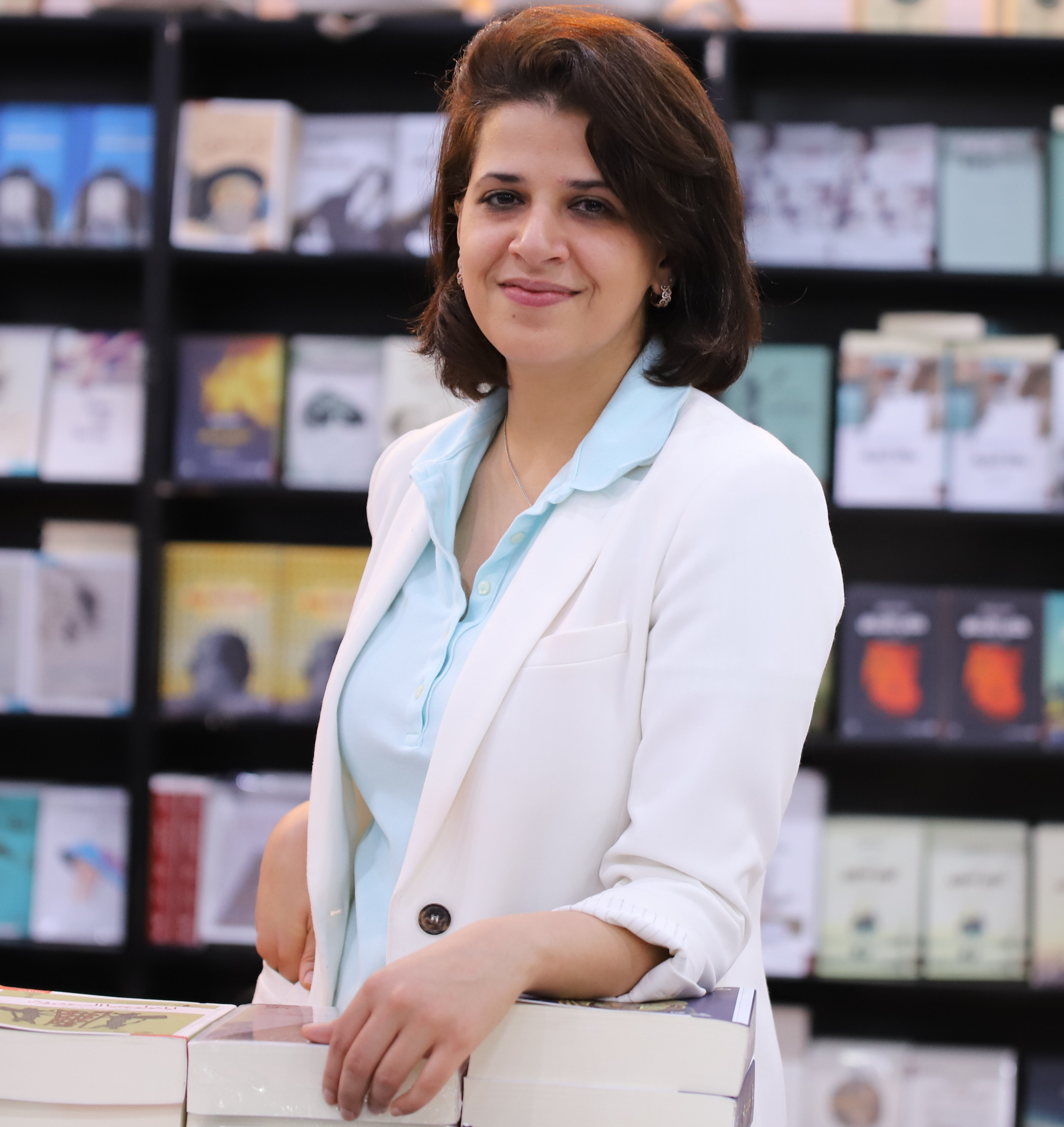
- Born: September 3, 1982 (age 43)
- Education: Kuwait University
- Occupations: Writer, publisher
- Notable work: The Book Censor’s Library

Bothayna El Essa (Arabic: بثينة العيسى) is a novelist from Kuwait. A well-known author in modern Arabic literature, her novel The Book Censor's Library was longlisted for the 2024 National Book Award for Fiction in their category for translated literature.

== Career ==
As of 2022, El Essa had published twelve novels in her native Arabic. She won the State Encouragement Award for her 2005 novel Saear. Further, she won the first place in the Youth and Sports Authority competition in 2003 in the short story section. Also, she ranked third in the Sheikha Basimah Al-Sabah competition in the short story section. In 2006 she won third place in the Al-Sada magazine competition for creative people in 2006. She is also the owner of a publishing house, a bookseller and has taught workshops for creative writing.

El Essa is a member of the Kuwaiti Writers Association as well as the Arab Internet Writers Union. In addition, she has campaigned against censorship in Kuwait until it was abolished in 2020.

In 2021, her novel The Book Censor’s Library won the Sharjah Award for Arab Creativity. In 2024, this dystopian novel, translated by Ranya Abdelrahman and Sawad Hussain, was longlisted for the National Book Award for Translated Literature.

== Works in English translation ==
- All that I want to forget. Translated by Michele Henjum. Cairo: American University in Cairo Press, 2019, ISBN 978 977 416 908 3.
- Lost in Mecca: A Novel. Translated by Nada Faris. Reading, UK: Dar Arab, 2024, ISBN 9781788710930.
- The Book Censor’s Library. Translated by Ranya Abdelrahman and Sawad Hussain. Amherst: Restless Books, 2024, ISBN 978-1632063342.
