= Deborah Jackson Taffa =

American author

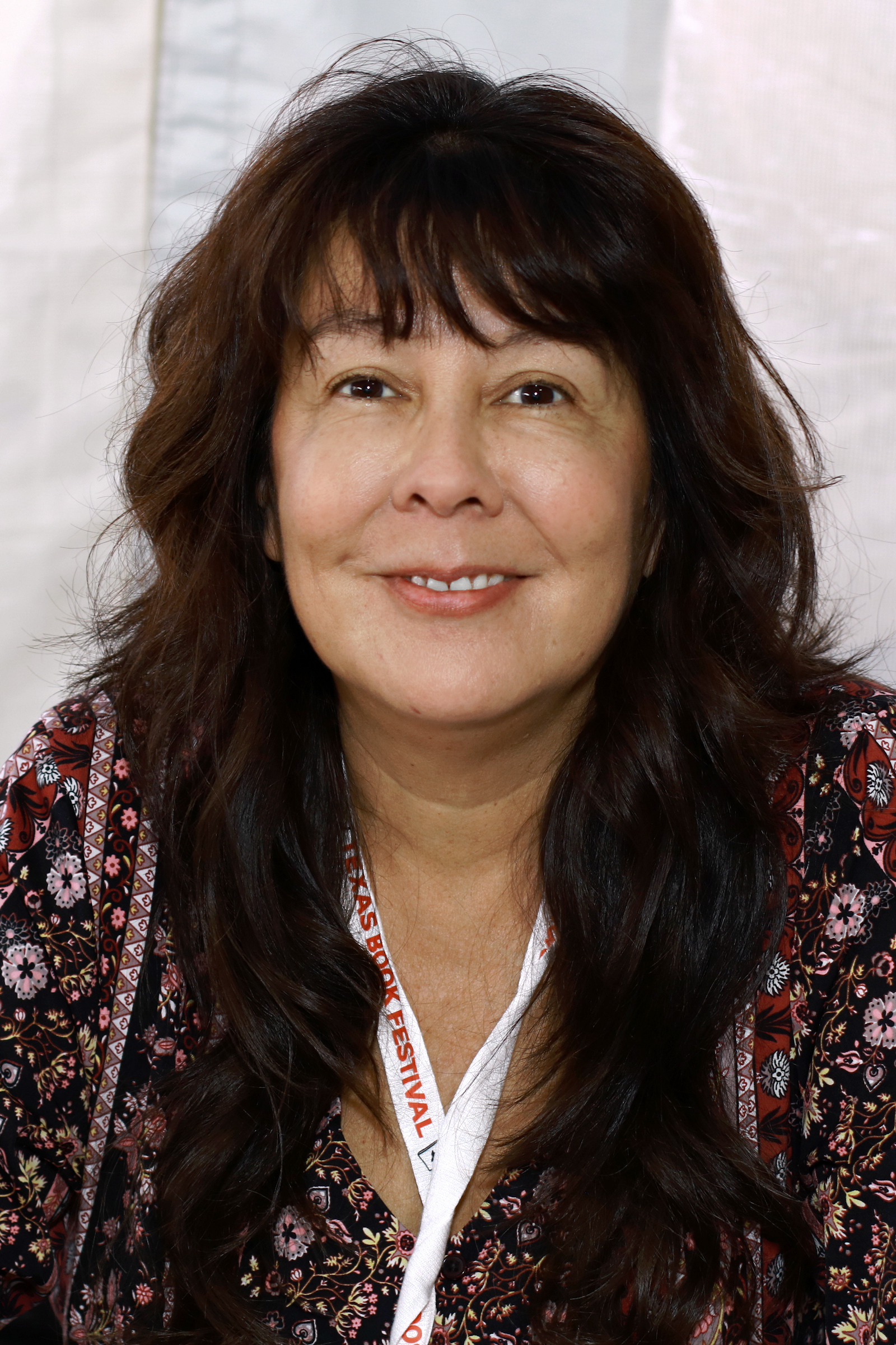
- Taffa at the 2024 Texas Book Festival.
- Born: Yuma, Arizona, United States
- Education: University of Iowa (MFA)
- Occupation: Writer
- Writing career
- Genre: Non-fiction
- Notable work: Whiskey Tender (2024)
- Website: deborahtaffa.com

Deborah Jackson Taffa is an Indigenous writer who is a member of the Quechan and Laguna Pueblo tribes. She is best known for her 2024 memoir Whiskey Tender. Whiskey Tender was a finalist for the 2024 National Book Award for Nonfiction. She earned a Masters of Fine Arts (MFA) in nonfiction writing from the University of Iowa. She is the director of the MFA creative writing program at the Institute of American Indian Arts in Santa Fe, New Mexico.

Whiskey Tender details Taffa's early life, growing up in Yuma, Arizona and then Farmington, New Mexico. She explains how her parents both reconciled their families' histories in different ways. Her father, who had Quechan and Laguna Pueblo ancestry, was traumatized about his past, specifically regarding the racist hostility perpetrated against him and his family. Her mother, a Latina American, was also conflicted about her past, but portrayed a confident appearance towards her children and society. Taffa features Native American history throughout her memoir, both her family's history and the history of Native Peoples in the United States. She devotes parts covering The American Indian Movement and Native Peoples' contributions to society in the United States, topics that were not covered in her high school curriculum. Writing for the Los Angeles Times, Ilana Masad stated Taffa did not discount her rage as an adolescence when writing in retrospect; instead she explored the injustices she and her ancestors endured, as well as the alienation of growing up from a mixed background to illuminate this anger.
