= Ghostroots =

2024 debut short story collection by Pemi Aguda

Ghostroots: Stories
- Author: 'Pemi Aguda
- Genre: Literary fiction, speculative fiction, horror
- Publisher: W. W. Norton & Company
- Publication date: May 7, 2024
- Pages: 224
- ISBN: 978-1324065852

Ghostroots: Stories is a 2024 debut short story collection by Nigerian writer 'Pemi Aguda, published by W. W. Norton & Company. It was a finalist for the National Book Award for Fiction and includes "Breastmilk", a short story that was a finalist for the Caine Prize.

== Background ==
The short stories are set in a reimagined Lagos, the city where Aguda grew up. In Interview, Aguda stated that it was a simple decision to write about the city that she knew best, though she specifically chose to write on themes of lineage and ancestry because she grew up not knowing much about her own family history relative to others around her. Aguda said, "some of these stories are writing into that gap, that absence, and asking what it means to not know who came before those who came before you."

== Table of contents ==
| Title | Original Publication |
|---|---|
| "Manifest" | Granta |
| "Breastmilk" | One Story |
| "Contributions" | American Short Fiction |
| "The Hollow" | Zoetrope: All-Story |
| "Imagine Me Carrying You" | Ploughshares |
| "24, Alhaji Williams Street" | Zoetrope: All-Story |
| "Things Boys Do" | Nightmare Magazine |
| "Birdwoman" | Omenana Magazine |
| "Girlie" | — |
| "The Wonders of the World" | — |
| "The Dusk Market" | Zyzzyva |
| "Masquerade Season" | Tor.com |

== Critical reception ==
Kirkus Reviews wrote that "The collection builds slowly, finding its emotional stride in the second half, when the characters’ interiorities are more developed and complex." Publishers Weekly found that some short stories were "underbaked" but concluded: "Overall, though, Nigerian myth and reality harmoniously come together in these meticulously constructed tales. These vivid slices of life are worth a look."

Afrocritik stated that "Some stories in the collection are more paranormal than one would anticipate, and others tilt towards the mundane as if not quite speculative enough, conflating the physical with the metaphysical. This ultimately gives Ghostroots some verisimilitude, relaying the wonders and travails while tugging conversations about female agency as is peculiar to Nigerian society." Republic found that "Whether they are the protagonists of these stories or supporting characters, all the women in Aguda’s stories are resolute and objective even when they move in ways others would interpret as selfish. It is a refreshing change of pace to read fiction where women are allowed to reckon with ugliness that comes with power and agency." The Lagos Review said that "Many of Pemi’s stories are family-oriented, particularly reflecting the typical African family dynamic. Many of her characters become easily relatable in that they embody the thoughts and emotions of many who have been forced to quieten their inner thoughts in order to please their parents and the society."

Chicago Review of Books praised the complexity of womanhood shown in the stories, stating, "There is no right way to move in Aguda’s world. It is a world haunted, burdened—and fascinating, for anyone brave enough to dive into her evocative, eerie stories." Locus said "Ghostroots, Pemi Aguda's spectacular debut collection, is an instant classic." Ancillary Review of Books wrote: "Ghostroots is an incredible addition to the canon of works that toe the line between generic horror and mimetic unsettlement ... it’s a must-read." The Hopkins Review concluded that "this psychologically rich and well-balanced collection satisfies at all levels." Financial Times said "Pemi Aguda's short stories evoke the chaos, smells, corruption and supernatural influences in Nigeria's biggest city."

== Awards ==
In October 2024, Ghostroots was shortlisted for the National Book Award for Fiction. The collection was also a finalist for the 2024 Los Angeles Times Book Prize, the 2025 Young Lions Fiction Award, and the 2025 PEN/Faulkner Award for Fiction.
