= Virginia Kirkus =

American writer and critic (1893–1980)

Virginia Kirkus (December 7, 1893 – September 10, 1980) was the founder and president of what would become Kirkus Reviews from 1933 to 1962.

Before creating her service in 1933, Kirkus was a teacher in Delaware during the late 1910s. In the 1920s, Kirkus went to New York to edit for Pictorial Review and McCall's. She was recruited to head the newly created children's fiction section for Harper & Brothers from 1925 to 1932.

== Early life and education ==
Virginia Kirkus was born on December 7, 1893, in Meadville, Pennsylvania. During her childhood, she moved to Wilmington, Delaware.

For her post-secondary education, Kirkus received a Bachelor of Arts from Vassar College in 1916 before going to Teachers College, Columbia University for her postgraduate studies in 1917.

She married Frank Glick, executive director of placement and personnel for the Associated Merchandising Company, on June 5, 1936.

== Career ==
Kirkus taught history and English at a private school from 1917 to 1919 before leaving Delaware for New York in the 1920s. In New York, Kirkus was an assistant editor for Pictorial Review's fashion department and an editor for McCall's. Kirkus moved to Harper & Brothers in 1925 and led the publisher's children's books section. When Harper & Brothers closed the children's department in 1932, Kirkus declined another job with the publisher and left the company.

While returning from a trip to Europe in 1932, Kirkus came up with the idea of creating brief reviews on upcoming books for bookshops. Kirkus created the Virginia Kirkus Bookshop Service in 1933 as president and held the position until 1962. Kirkus reviewed 16,000 books during her tenure with her bookshop service. After her departure, the Virginia Kirkus Bookshop Service was renamed multiple times in the 1960s before becoming Kirkus Reviews in 1969. Apart from book reviews, Kirkus published a book about health in 1922 and edited two children's books in the 1930s. She later released a book about home renovation in 1940 and a gardening book in 1956.

== Personal life ==
On September 10, 1980, Kirkus died in Danbury, Connecticut. She was married to Frank Glick; they had no children.
