= Yvette Tetteh =

Ghanaian entrepreneur and activist

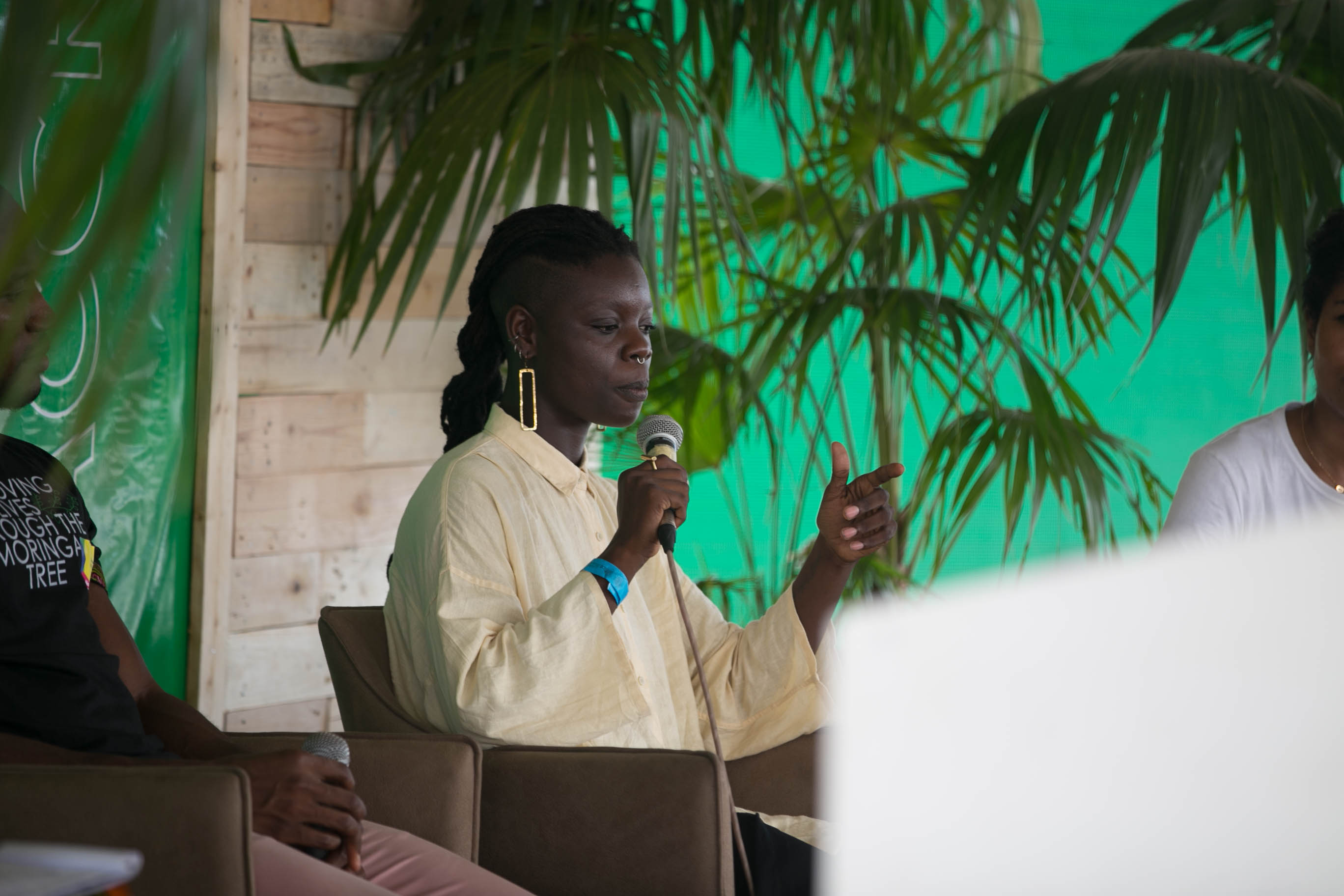
- Tetteh speaking in 2018
- Born: Yvette Yaa Konadu Tetteh
- Education: Stanford University
- Occupation: Entrepreneur
- Known for: Yvaya Farm
- Notable work: Agbetsi Living Water Expedition

Yvette Yaa Konadu Tetteh is a Ghanaian-British entrepreneur and CEO of Pure and Just Food, which operates the brand Yvaya Farm Dried Fruit. She is noted to be the first Ghanaian to swim the down the length of the Volta River in Ghana.

== Early life and education ==
Tetteh attended Stanford University for her bachelor's degree.

== Swim across the Volta River ==
In March 2023, Tetteh set out to swim down the Ghana's Volta River in collaboration with The Or Foundation on their Agbetsi Living Water Expedition. Her swim was to raise awareness around the pollution of the water bodies in Ghana by second-hand clothing from developed countries in the Global North. The expedition aimed to expand research about the impact of textile microfibre pollution on Ghanaian waterways and to support policy change as part of the Stop Waste Colonialism campaign, by calling for globally accountable Extended Producer Responsibility policy regarding textiles and clothing.

Tetteh swam a total of 450 Kilometres (280 miles) from the Northern part of the Volta River to the South. Expedition crew lived and worked on a fully solar powered research vessel built in Ghana.
