= Prevention Through Deterrence =

Set of United States border policies

Prevention Through Deterrence is a set of policies instituted by the United States to deter the illegal crossing of its southern border with Mexico. First introduced in a document titled "Border Patrol Strategic Plan of 1994 and Beyond," this policy has since been used to police high-traffic areas of the Mexico–United States border.

Since its institution, the number of migrant deaths at the southern border of the U.S. has doubled, with 75% occurring in the Sonoran Desert. Mexico's Secretariat of Foreign Affairs places the number of deaths at roughly 450 per year (including migrant deaths on both the US and Mexican territory).

== Locations ==
In order to use the uninhabited environment of the Sonoran Desert in prevention through deterrence, border patrol increased surveillance in cities along the southern border, which pushed migrant entry points into rural areas. This area is one of the most heavily trafficked areas of the southern border, with about half of border apprehensions occurring in this sector. The harsh conditions of the desert also impact the recovery of remains and work done by humanitarian groups.

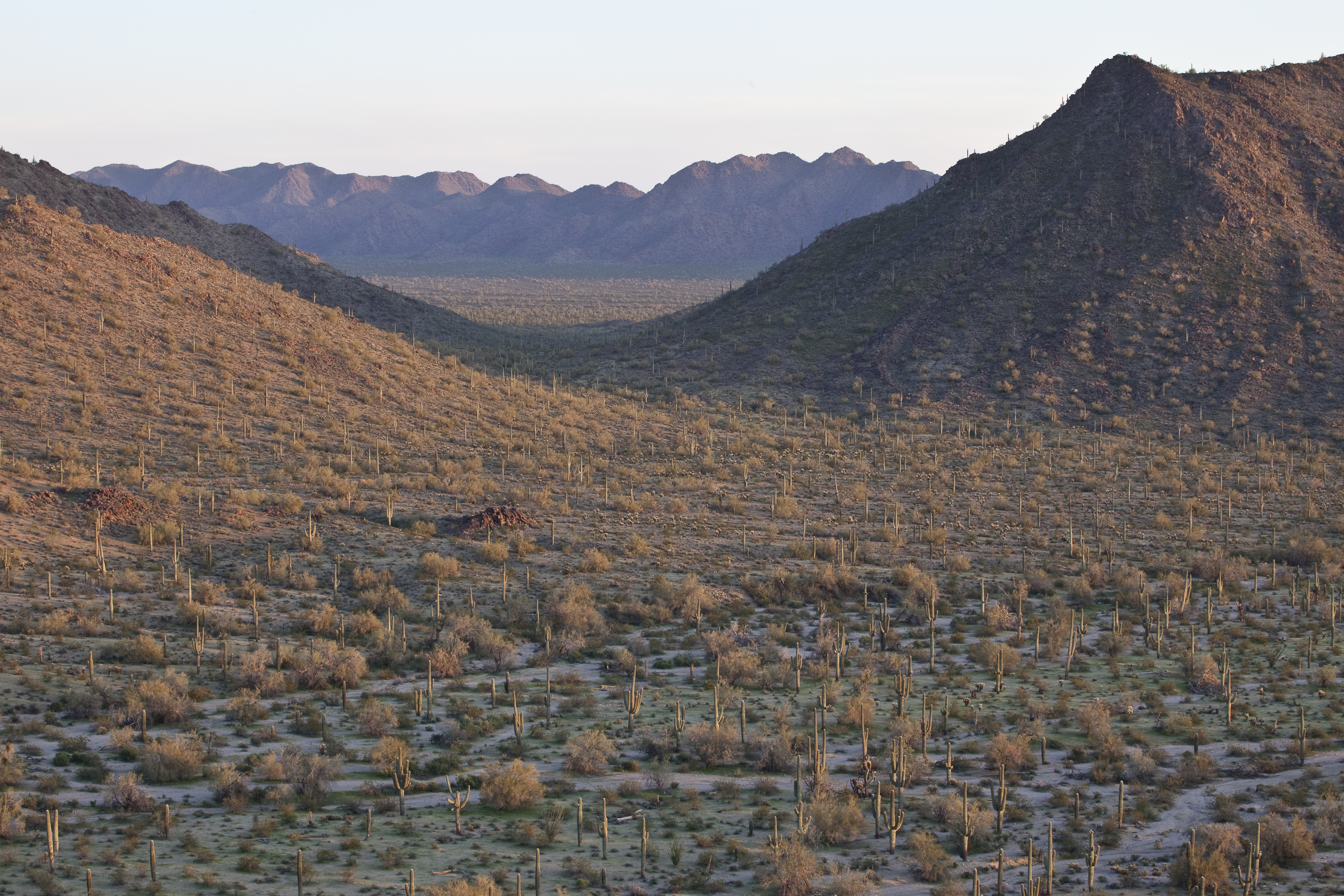
Sonoran Desert

Many migrants also chose to cross the Río Bravo which separates northeast Mexico from Texas because this area is known to have less border security. Migrants from Central America have used the means of the Rio Grande in order to cross the border as well.

Over 22 years (from 1990 to 2012), 2,238 migrant bodies were found in Pima County, Arizona, and 1,813 bodies, over half of those recovered, died from exposure. However, these statistics only include the migrants' bodies that were recovered and only represent a small portion of the border.

== History ==
The United States implemented "Prevention through Deterrence" in the 1990s when immigrants crossing the Rio Grande from Reynosa, Mexico attracted the media's attention pressuring immigration officials and politicians to create a new enforcement policy. The idea is to redirect the routes of the migrants into the Sonoran Desert to discourage migrants from crossing. The United States Government relies on the environment of the Sonoran Desert to deter these migrants without much help from the border enforcement agency.

=== Previous US strategies ===
==== Operation Blockade (1993) ====
Operation Blockade occurred from September 19, 1993, through October 2, 1993. Border Patrol agents were deployed along the 20-mile segment of the border "on an around-the clock basis and with repairs to the border fence in downtown El Paso area". The intention was to shift the traffic away from the city and "put [migrants] out in areas where they’re on [Border Patrol’s] turf". The impact of the operation was seen immediately, because the usual level of attempted entry and arrest declined. This approach soon evolved into the policy of Prevention through Deterrence.

==== Chinese Exclusion Act of 1882 ====
The Chinese Exclusion Act of 1882 was a federal statute that prohibited Chinese laborers from entering and re-entering the United States. When Chinese laborers were denied entrance they would enter the United States illegally through the southern border with Mexico.

According to anthropologist Jason De León, it was during the implementation of the Act that an early application of prevention through deterrence by the immigration agents occurred. In order to deter more immigrants from crossing, patrol officers only apprehended immigrants on established routes where they had access to resources; this forced immigrants into more rural areas with less resources. Scholars state, "from their earliest work [by] enforcing the Chinese Exclusion Acts [enacted in 1882], immigration authorities [have] discovered that the desert and mountain wilderness [can] be made effective allies in the fight against undocumented entry".

== Debates ==
=== Measurement ===
The effect of prevention through deterrence is measured in different ways. The U.S. government can use the number of immigrant apprehensions to evaluate prevention through deterrence but, this does not measure how many migrants elude border patrol or how many migrants are dying at the southern border. A 1997 report by the Government Accountability Office did use the immigrant death toll to measure the effect of prevention through deterrence. The Department of Homeland Security also publishes the number of migrant deaths; however, it is often the lowest estimate since it is based on the number of remains recovered.

From 2000 to 2022, Pima County, which shares a border with Mexico and contains much of the Sonoran Desert, recorded and investigated 3,655 reports of undocumented border crosser remains. Out of these remains 64% have been identified and 36% remain unidentified.

=== Praise ===
The goals of the Strategic Plan of 1994, as stated by border patrol, were not only to slow the number of migrants crossing the southern border, but to promote confidence in the United States' ability to protect that border. By apprehending more undocumented immigrants using prevention through deterrence, border patrol also wanted to "protect the immigration heritage" that serves as the foundation of the United States today. By using terms like "tactical advantage" and "deterring", government documents format prevention through deterrence as a humane but powerful strategy.

=== Criticism ===
One major criticism of prevention through deterrence is that it shifts the blame of migrant deaths from the government to the environment. Without taking into account undetermined causes of death, most migrants crossing the Sonoran Desert have died due to environmental exposure. There have also been concerns about the treatment of human remains and how encouraging migrants to cross the Sonoran Desert not only increases the number of migrant deaths but prevents the recovery of remains. This prevents families from getting closure about the death of loved ones.

Human rights groups like No Más Muertes (No More Deaths) have criticized prevention through deterrence and border patrol for discouraging humanitarian aid at the border. Several members of No Más Muertes have been given tickets or arrested for leaving water in the Sonoran Desert in order to assist migrants.

Documentaries like "Undeterred" https://undeterredfilm.org/ (Eva Lewis, 2019) portray community resistance in the rural border town of Arivaca, Arizona, where since these policies where implemented border residents have been on the front-lines of the humanitarian crisis caused by increased border enforcement build up, such as border patrol interior checkpoints.

==== Shaping history ====
According to De León, the U.S. government does not acknowledge the part it plays in the increase of migrant deaths at the southern border; however, over the past 20 years the United States government has been collecting materials left behind by undocumented immigrants. Therefore, artifacts are no longer available for scholars like to study. As Paul Farmer pointed out, this is a technique used by authoritative structures to establish a particular historical account of an event.
