= Jason De León =

American anthropologist

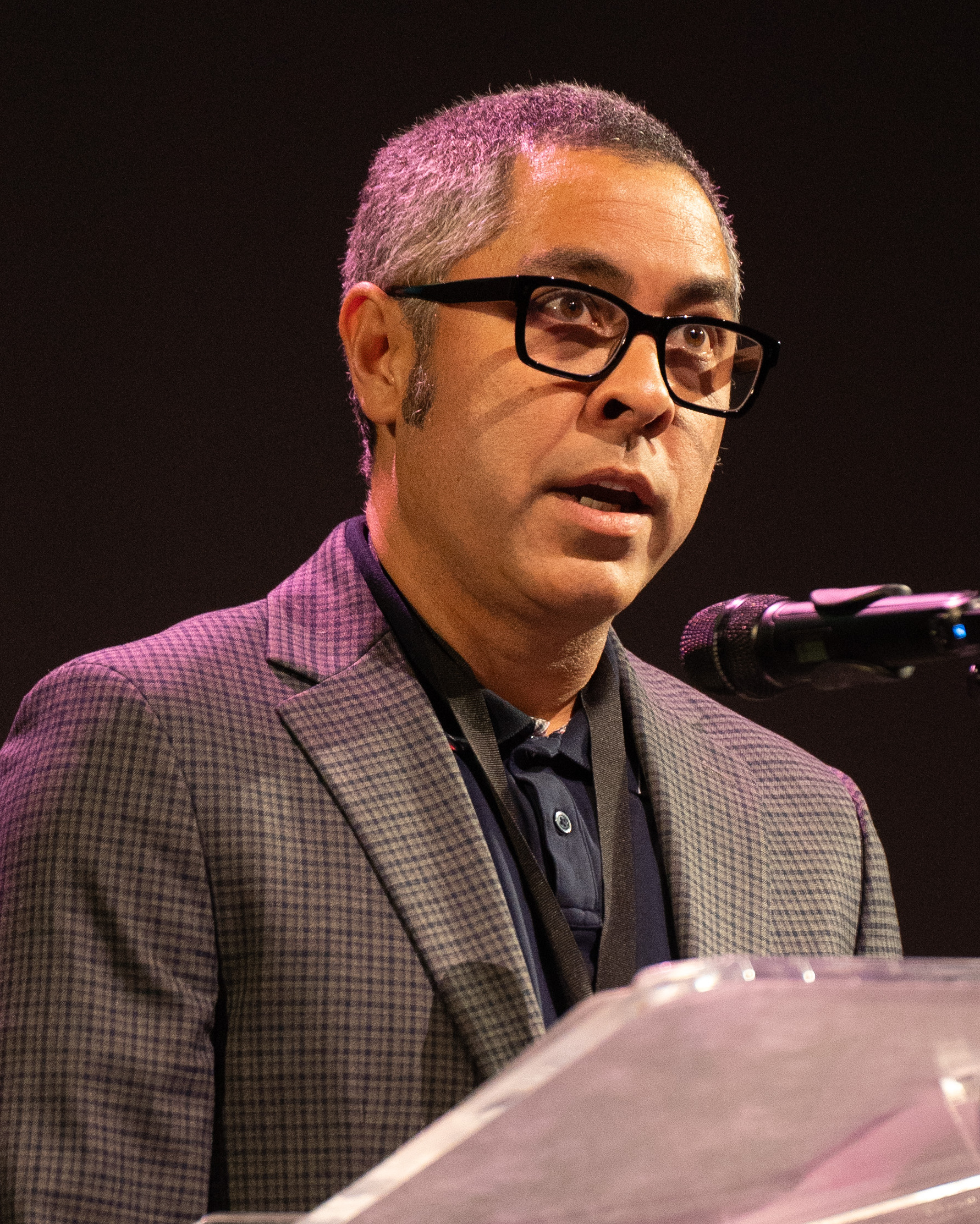
De León at the 2024 National Book Awards finalist reading

Jason De León is an anthropologist who studies migration from Latin America to the United States, particularly that of clandestine migrants crossing the Mexico–United States border. De León holds the Loyd E. Cotsen Endowed Chair of Archaeology, is Director of the Cotsen Institute of Archaeology, and Professor of Anthropology and Chicana/o and Central American Studies at the University of California, Los Angeles. He is also the director of the Undocumented Migration Project, a non-profit research/arts/education collective aimed at documenting and raising awareness about migration issues globally.

Since 2009, he has traveled frequently to the Sonoran Desert in Arizona to collect artifacts left behind by migrants trying to gain access to the United States. He was named a National Geographic Emerging Explorer in 2013, and a MacArthur Fellow in 2017. His Undocumented Migration Project includes more than 9000 objects, some of which are on display at the Smithsonian's National Museum of American History in Washington, D.C.

== Early and personal life ==
De León is a Mexican-Filipino American Army brat who grew up largely in McAllen, Texas, near the Mexican border in the Rio Grande Valley, and in Long Beach, California. His native language is English and he is also fluent in Spanish.

De León is a graduate of Wilson High School in Long Beach. He received his BA in anthropology in 2001 from the University of California, Los Angeles, and both his MA in 2004 and his PhD in 2008 from Pennsylvania State University. His dissertation, "The Lithic Industries of San Lorenzo-Tenochtitlán: An Economic and Technological Study of Olmec Obsidian", was based on years of archaeological fieldwork in Mexico excavating obsidian tool artifacts left by indigenous people thousands of years ago.

Outside of his academic work, he is a musician who has been involved in various bands and musical projects over the years. He co-hosted a television show on the Discovery Channel in 2011 called American Treasures. He currently plays bass in War Pigs, a political punk band he co-founded with his children. War Pigs released their debut album "Breakfast Music" on UMP Records in March of 2026.

== Academic career ==
De León is Director of the Cotsen Institute for Archaeology and the Lloyd E. Cotsen Endowed Professor of Archaeology, as well as Professor of Anthropology and Chicana/o and Central American Studies at the University of California, Los Angeles. From 2008 to 2010 he was a lecturer in anthropology at the University of Washington, and he taught at the University of Michigan from 2010 to 2019. From 2013 to 2014 he was a Weatherhead scholar at the School for Advanced Research.

De León's self-described areas of interest and methods include undocumented migration and deportation, human smuggling, violence, materiality, archaeology of the contemporary, photo-ethnography, and forensic science. His work has been described as a multidisciplinary approach to Latin America to US migration and involves ethnographic analysis of migrant stories, forensic science, and archaeological research. It has also been described as an "intersection of physical geography, cultural geography, and archaeology," as he uses tools like GPS to document sites. He says that archaeology is "studying the past through material traces." We tend to think these must be ancient things" and asks us to question, "What happens if you think about the archaeology of the recent past, as recently as this morning in some cases"?

=== Undocumented Migration Project (UMP) and Hostile Terrain 94 (HT94) ===
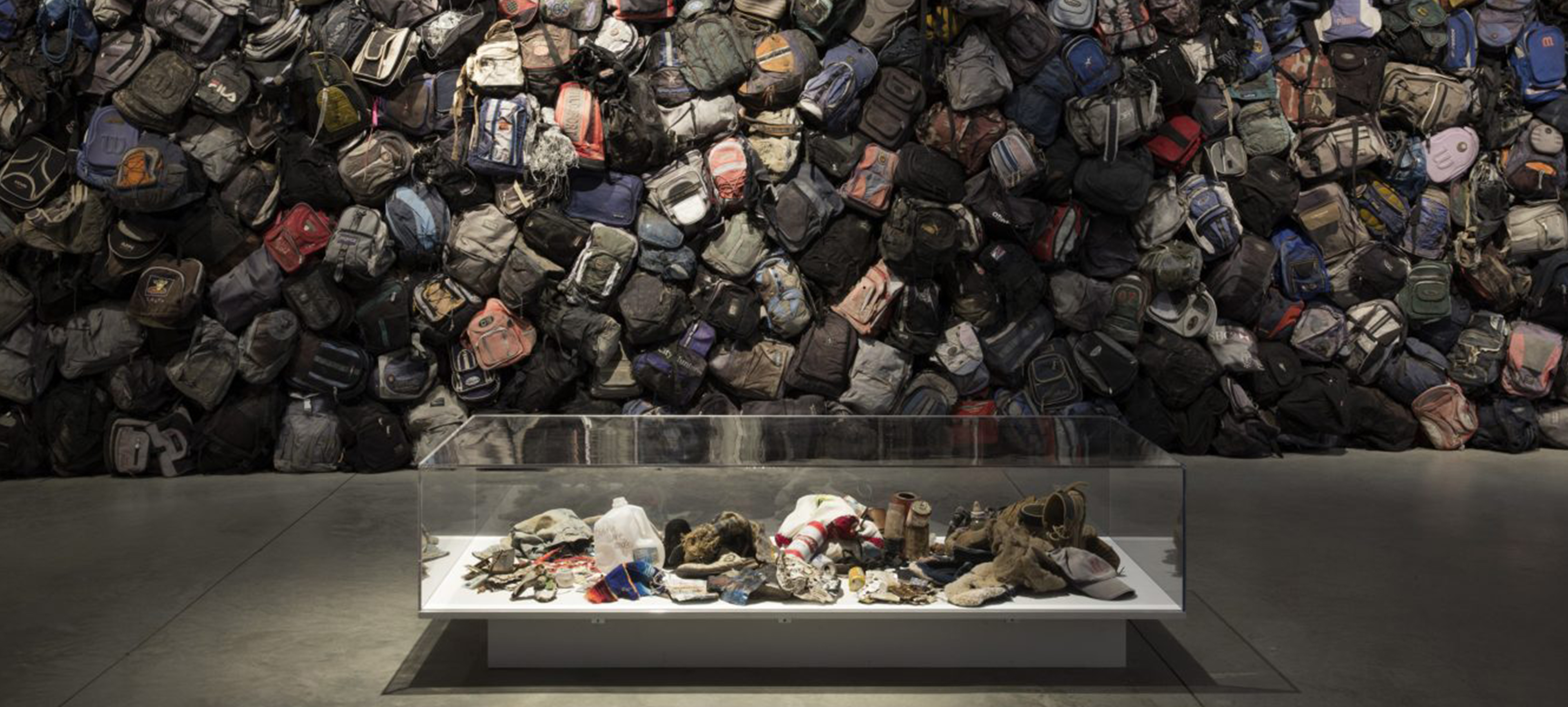
The Things They Carried: Undocumented Migration Project

As executive director of the long-term Undocumented Migration Project (UMP) Inc., a 501(c)(3) that began in 2009, De León uses fieldwork to "collect, catalogue, and interpret nearly 10,000 objects left in the desert by migrants making the treacherous, undocumented border crossing from Mexico into the United States" and says these objects become artifacts.

Between 2009 and 2015, the UMP's work focused on the Sonoran Desert of Arizona. From 2015-2024 the project focused on the role of human smugglers moving migrants across the length of Mexico. In recent years the UMP has expanded to focus on European migration and on outreach with young people in migrant sending communities in Mexico.

From 2013 to 2017, De León co-curated an exhibition of artifacts and other materials collected by the Undocumented Migration Project in a show called State of Exception that was featured in multiple locations including the Museum of Contemporary Art Detroit and the New School in New York City.

As part of UMP, De León directs Hostile Terrain 94 (HT94), a participatory art project resulting in an exhibition of 5,200+ handwritten toe tags that represent migrants who have died trying to cross the Sonoran Desert of Arizona between the mid-1990s and 2025. These tags are geolocated on a wall map of the desert showing the exact locations where remains were found. HT94 has been shown in the US and around the world, debuting a virtual exhibition on July 17, 2020. This ongoing exhibition has been installed in over 150 locations around the globe including various locations in the United States, as well as Mexico, Germany, Switzerland, the Netherlands, Denmark, Ireland, and beyond.

¡Listen Up! and UMP Records

In 2026, De León launched ¡Listen Up!, a music outreach program intended to amplify the voices of underserved youth, such as migrant, immigrant, indigenous and LGBTQ+ youth. Through mixed media workshops that focus on storytelling, songwriting, performance, recording, and video production they seek to equip young people with the skills and tools to create art that reflects their experiences, world views, and hopes and aspirations for the future.

Organized by the Undocumented Migration Project, !Listen Up! works with community partners in regions around the globe impacted by migration, climate change, and economic and social inequality. The goal is to create free workshops that connect local and international musicians, artists, writers, and social scientists with young people to teach them various elements of storytelling, music performance, and video and audio production while also helping to create local infrastructure that will continue to support youth enrichment into the future. Music produced by ¡Listen Up! is released on UMP Records, a non-profit record label sponsored by the Undocumented Migration Project.

== Publications and awards ==
De León has published numerous peer-reviewed articles and book chapters, has been involved in dozens of museum works and exhibitions, and has been the recipient of numerous research grants, awards, fellowships and honors, including a 2017–2022 MacArthur Foundation Fellowship. His scholarly articles have been published in American Anthropologist, Journal of Forensic Sciences, and Journal of Contemporary Archaeology.

De León's first book, The Land of Open Graves: Living and Dying on the Migrant Trail, combines the use of ethnography, archaeology, linguistics, and forensic science to document the human consequences of US immigration policy. The book received the 2016 Margaret Mead Award and the 2018 JI Staley Prize and has received positive reviews in many media outlets including The New York Times.

De León's second book, Soldiers and Kings: Survival and Hope in the World of Human Smuggling, was published by Viking Books in March 2024. The book is based on seven years of ethnographic work in Mexico and Honduras, and traces the lives of several individuals involved in the smuggling of Central American migrants across the length of Mexico. It won the National Book Award for Nonfiction in 2024. Soldiers and Kings was long-listed for the 2025 PEN/Jean Stein Book Award.
