= Kirkus Reviews =

American book review magazine

- Cover of November 15, 2024, issue
- Editor: Virginia Kirkus (1933 – July 1962)
- Categories: Book reviews
- Frequency: Semi-monthly
- First issue: January 1933; 93 years ago
- Company: Virginia Kirkus Bookshop Service, Virginia Kirkus Service, Inc. (from 1962), and others Kirkus Media, LLC (from 2010)
- Country: United States
- Based in: New York City, U.S.
- Language: English
- Website: kirkusreviews.com
- ISSN: 1948-7428
- OCLC: 12234808

Kirkus Reviews is an American book review magazine founded in 1933 by Virginia Kirkus. The magazine's publisher, Kirkus Media, is headquartered in New York City. Kirkus Reviews confers the annual Kirkus Prize to authors of fiction, nonfiction, and young readers' literature.

Kirkus Reviews, published on the first and 15th of each month, previews books before their publication. It previews over 10,000 titles per year.

== History ==
In 1926, Virginia Kirkus was hired by Harper and Brothers to establish a children's book department. In 1932, the department was eliminated as a Depression-era economic measure. Within a year, Louise Raymond, the secretary Kirkus hired, had successfully advocated for funding to restore the division and became its leader. Kirkus left the company in the interim period, establishing her own book-review service. Initially, she arranged to get galley proofs of "20 or so" books in advance of their publication; almost 80 years later, the service was receiving hundreds of books weekly and reviewing about 100.

Initially titled Bulletin by Kirkus' Bookshop Service from 1933 to 1954, the title was changed to Bulletin from Virginia Kirkus' Service from January 1, 1955, issue onwards, and successively shortened to Virginia Kirkus' Service with the December 15, 1964, issue, and Kirkus Service in 1967, before it attained its current title, Kirkus Reviews, with January 1, 1969, issue.

In 1985, Anne Larsen was brought on as fiction editor, soon to become editor, remaining the editorial head of Kirkus until 2006 and modifying the review format and style for improved readability, concision, accuracy, and impact.

== Ownership ==
Kirkus Reviews was sold to The New York Review of Books in 1970 and subsequently sold by the Review to Barbara Bader and Josh Rubins, who served also as the publication's editors. In 1985, magazine consultant James B. Kobak acquired Kirkus Reviews. David LeBreton bought Kirkus from Kobak in 1993. BPI Communications, owned by Dutch publisher VNU, bought Kirkus from LeBreton in 1999. At the end of 2009, the company announced the end of operations for Kirkus.

The journal was purchased from VNU (by then renamed The Nielsen Company, or Nielson N.V.) on February 10, 2010, by businessman Herbert Simon. Terms were not disclosed. The company was thereafter renamed Kirkus Media, and book-industry veteran Marc Winkelman was made publisher.

== Reviewing ==
Kirkus Reviews has a traditional program of reviewing that does not require payment for reviews. Kirkus Reviews also offers an indie program that allows book authors to purchase, but not modify or influence, reviews that the book author can choose whether or not to publish on the Kirkus website, and if published may also be published in the magazine or email newsletter based on Kirkus editor discretion.

== Kirkus Prize ==
In 2014, Kirkus Reviews started the Kirkus Prize, bestowing $50,000 prizes annually to authors of fiction, nonfiction, and young readers' literature.

== Kirkus Indie Awards ==
In 2026 Kirkus Reviews launched a new, additional set of 8 prizes for independently published authors. Six finalists in each of the 8 categories -- History & Biography, Memoir, Literary Fiction, Mysteries & Thrillers, Science Fiction & Fantasy, Romance, Picture Books, and Children's Literature -- were announced on July 7, 2026.
