= Henrietta Hooker =

American botanist and educator (1851–1929)

Henrietta Edgecomb Hooker
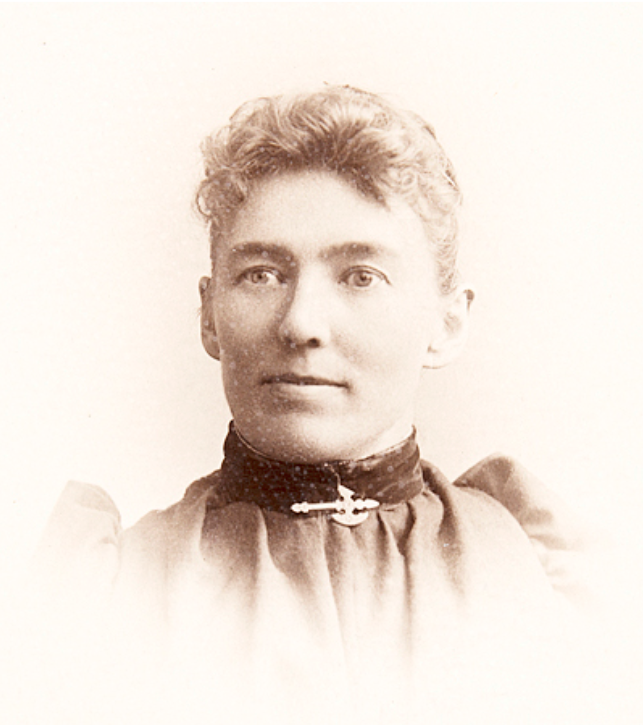
- Hooker in 1893
- Born: December 12, 1851; Gardiner, Maine
- Died: May 13, 1929 (aged 77); Holyoke, Massachusetts
- Education: Mount Holyoke College; Syracuse University
- Scientific career
- Fields: Botany
- Institutions: Mount Holyoke College
- Thesis: On Cuscuta Gronovii (1889)

Signature
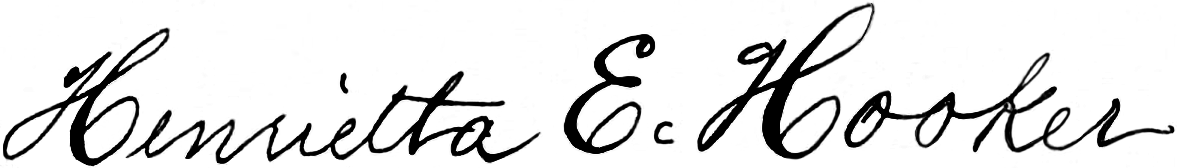

Henrietta Edgecomb Hooker (December 12, 1851 – May 13, 1929) was an American botanist and professor at Mount Holyoke Female Seminary (now Mount Holyoke College). She was the second female doctoral graduate in botany at Syracuse University, which made her one of the first women to earn a Ph.D. in botany from any U.S. university.

== Early life and education ==
Hooker was born to Eliza Annie Hooker and George Washington Hooker in 1851, and was orphaned at the age of seven. In 1867, at age sixteen, she began working at a New England cotton factory, but after a week of employment there, she sought help in finding a different job. Hooker taught in Vermont public schools from 1869 to 1870, and at the Academy of West Charleston from 1870 to 1871.

Hooker entered Mount Holyoke Female Seminary in 1871 and graduated in 1873. She did graduate work at MIT, and the universities of Syracuse, Berlin, and Chicago. She earned a Ph.D. from Syracuse University in 1889 with a dissertation on the vine Cuscuta gronovii. Hooker was among the first women to earn a Ph.D. in botany in the United States.

== Career ==
After her graduation in 1873, Hooker joined Mount Holyoke as a faculty member, working alongside her former teacher Lydia Shattuck and zoologist Cornelia Clapp. In 1899, she was one of two teachers with a Ph.D. at Mount Holyoke (the other being Clapp, the first woman in the United States to be awarded that degree in biology).

Hooker taught at Mount Holyoke for thirty-five years. As the chair of the botany department, she advocated for expansion of the curriculum into newer branches of the field and for improvements to laboratory space and equipment. Her research focused on the morphology and embryology of Cuscuta, a genus of parasitic plants.

Hooker's commitment to Mount Holyoke extended beyond her retirement in 1908. She bred prize-winning Buff Orpington chickens and donated the winnings to the school.

Mount Holyoke awarded her an honorary Sc.D in 1923, and Hooker Auditorium is named in her honor.

== Works ==
- Hooker, Henrietta E. (1889). "On Cuscuta Gronovii". Botanical Gazette. 14 (2): 31–37. doi:10.1086/326377. S2CID 85098984.
- Hooker, Henrietta E. (1890). "Lydia W. Shattuck as a Student and Teacher of Science". Memorial of Lydia W. Shattuck. Beacon Press. pp. 25–31.
- Hooker, Henrietta (1897). "Mount Holyoke College". New England Magazine. Vol. 15, no. 5.
