= Lydia Shattuck =

American botanist, chemist, and educator (1822–1889)

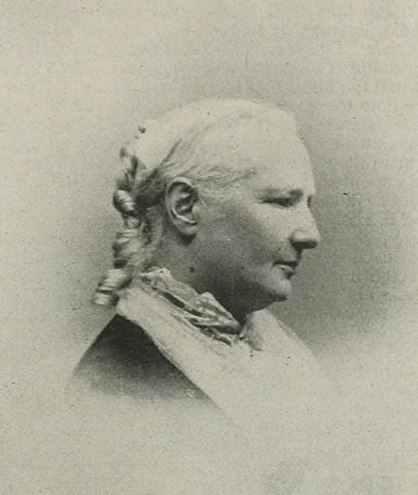
- Born: June 10, 1822; Easton, New Hampshire
- Died: November 2, 1889 (aged 67); South Hadley, Massachusetts
- Education: Mount Holyoke College
- Scientific career
- Fields: Botany, Chemistry
- Workplaces: Mount Holyoke College
- Notable students: Cornelia Clapp; Henrietta Hooker

Signature
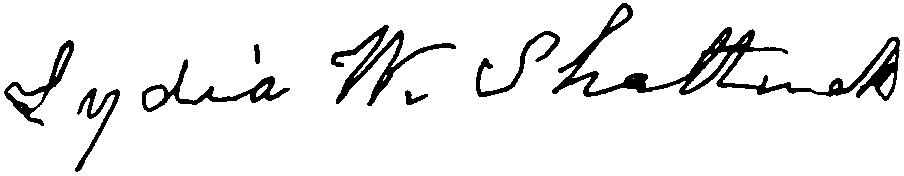

Lydia White Shattuck (June 10, 1822 – November 2, 1889) was an American botanist, naturalist, chemist, and professor at Mount Holyoke Female Seminary (now Mount Holyoke College).

== Early life and education ==
Shattuck was born in 1822 in East Landoff (now Easton), New Hampshire to first cousins Betsey Fletcher and Timothy Shattuck, and she was the only one of their first five children to survive past infancy. When she was a young girl, her mother would take her on excursions through the woods, which inspired a love of nature, particularly wildflowers.

At fifteen, she completed local schooling and began teaching district schools. Over the next eleven years, she also studied at academies in Newbury, Vermont and Haverhill, New Hampshire for brief periods when not teaching. In 1848, at age twenty-six, she entered Mount Holyoke Female Seminary, from which she graduated in 1851 with honor. She was a student in the last class Mary Lyon taught and would watch over Lyon in her final days before her death in 1849.

== Career ==
Immediately after her graduation in 1851, Shattuck became a professor of botany and chemistry at her alma mater. Initially, she would also teach subjects ranging from astronomy to geometry to physiology, but by 1887–1888 would exclusively teach botany. Her tenure overlapped with those of Cornelia Clapp (class of 1871) and Henrietta Hooker (class of 1873), both students of Shattuck who returned to teach at their alma mater. Shattuck helped guide the establishment of the Mount Holyoke College Botanic Garden in 1878 and would additionally collect, classify, and catalog seven thousand plants for its collection. She would also regularly advocate for and acquire updated department equipment and household appliances (e.g., "steam heating, the elevator, the artesian well") for the school.

Shattuck was notable for her correspondence and friendship with numerous prominent scientists, including Asa Gray, Charles H. Hitchcock, Joseph Rothrock, and Charles A. Young. Her efforts established connections between scientists at Mount Holyoke College and the broader scientific community, as she was able to secure "various distinguished visiting professors" for the school. Shattuck and founder Mary Lyon are considered "the two guiding forces in science" during the first fifty years of the school's history.

In the very beginning of the seminary, science had a prominent place in its course of study. Botany was in both the first and second years of the three years' course. Chemistry, geology, astronomy, natural philosophy, physiology, and philosophy of natural history had each its appointed place — seven sciences in a course of twenty-three studies. Names have changed since then, and work had broadened; botany and zoology have stretched out into the deeper researches of biology. [...] since this is a scientific age and we are bound to keep abreast of the times; since every college has its own particular individuality — let us press onward in these lines till we obtain full recognition among the colleges of New England, claiming the right to confer degrees whenever it can be shown that our pupils have done as much and as good work as other colleges require for the same degrees.

— Lydia Shattuck, "The Seminary and Science", 1887 reunion

Shattuck worked with Arnold Henri Guyot and Louis Agassiz at the Anderson School of Natural History on Penikese Island, an experimental residential summer school that provided women with postbaccalaureate education when it was not a formal option for them. In 1873, the year the school opened, its founders, including Elizabeth Cabot Agassiz, the first president of Radcliffe College, selected fifty scientists to attend the inaugural session, and Shattuck was one of sixteen women selected. She was also one of a handful of women chemists at the first meeting of the 1874 Priestly centennial, from which the American Chemical Society was born. However, she was excluded from a picture taken of the founders, as she had been asked to stand with the wives of the male chemists in attendance. She was a member of scientific societies such as the Connecticut Valley Botanical Association, for which she served as president; the Torrey Botanical Club (now Torrey Botanical Society); and the Woods Hole Biological Laboratory Corporation (now Marine Biological Laboratory).

She retired in 1889, one year after Mount Holyoke received its collegiate charter, and was given the title of professor emeritus.

== Legacy ==
Shattuck actively canvassed for donations for the construction of a new chemistry and physics building at Mount Holyoke until her death in 1889. Henrietta Hooker, who succeeded her as head of the botany department, campaigned successfully for a planned science building to be named in her honor.

Miss Shattuck was more to us than a botanist. She was a naturalist to whom it was easy, in those field excursions on which she led us, to give us charming glimpses of the food for thought and study in the rocks, clouds, and living creatures, which were as much the subjects of her talks as the plants we sought.

— Henrietta Hooker, "Miss Shattuck as a Student and Teacher of Science"

Two buildings on campus have been named after her: the first, which housed the chemistry and physics departments, was opened in 1892 then torn down in 1954; the second was opened as the New Physics Building in 1932 and renamed Shattuck Hall after the first was torn down.

Her letters are considered key historical documents that provide insight into 19th century scientific inquiry.
