= Joan Ruderman =

American molecular and cell biologist

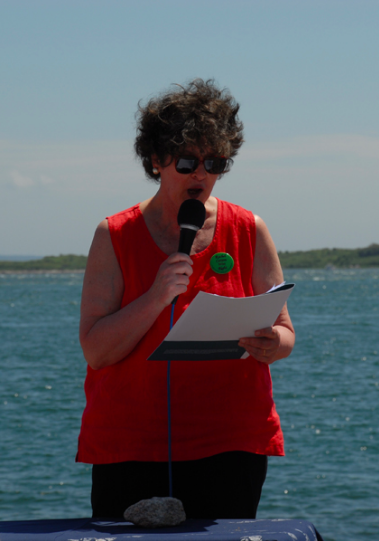
- Education: Barnard College (B.A.); Massachusetts Institute of Technology (Ph.D.)
- Scientific career
- Fields: Molecular and cellular biology
- Workplaces: Duke University; Harvard Medical School; Princeton Environmental Institute

Joan V. Ruderman (born 1947/48) is an American molecular and cell biologist. She is a professor emeritus at Harvard University and Visiting Senior Biologist at Princeton University. She has researched cell division and embryo development, and more recently the effects of, and the public understanding of, environmental estrogens and other endocrine disruptors. She was elected as a member of the United States National Academy of Sciences in 1998.

== Education and career ==
She received her BA from Barnard College in 1969 and her Ph.D. from MIT in 1974. She was on the faculty of Duke University, and joined the faculty of Harvard Medical School in 1976. At Harvard, she was the Marion V. Nelson Professor of Cell Biology.

She first attended the Marine Biological Laboratory in 1974, for a summer course on embryology. With Ann Stuart she founded the Periwinkle Club, a summer day camp for young children of MBL scientists. She was on the Board of Trustees of the MBL from 1986 to 2012, and she was on the executive committee and Speaker of the MBL Corporation from 2008 to 2012. She succeeded Gary Borisy as president and Director of the MBL as the first women to hold the post, serving from November 2012 until November 2014, when she was succeeded by Arthur Sussman as interim president and then Huntington Willard. While she was president, the MBL joined the University of Chicago in July 2013 and became more financially stable.

She was also a member of the Radcliffe Institute of Advanced Study from 2010 to 2011. She joined Princeton Environmental Institute in February 2015.

She was elected to the American Academy of Arts and Sciences in 1991.

== Works ==
- Swenson, Katherine I.; Farrell, Kevin M.; Ruderman, Joan V. (December 26, 1986). "The clam embryo protein cyclin A induces entry into M phase and the resumption of meiosis in Xenopus oocytes". Cell. 47 (6): 861–870. doi:10.1016/0092-8674(86)90801-9. PMID 2946420. S2CID 29142936.

== Personal life ==
She is married to Gerald Ruderman, an engineer. Their daughter Zoe (born 1983/4) is a journalist in New York City.
