= The Lives of a Cell: Notes of a Biology Watcher =

1974 collection of essays by Lewis Thomas

- Front cover of 1974 Bantam edition, ISBN 0-553-13972-X
- Author: Lewis Thomas
- Language: English
- Subject: Biology
- Published: 1974 (The Viking Press)
- Publication place: United States
- Media type: Print

The Lives of a Cell: Notes of a Biology Watcher (1974) is collection of 29 essays written by Lewis Thomas for The New England Journal of Medicine between 1971 and 1973. Throughout his essays, Thomas touches on subjects as various as biology, anthropology, medicine, music (showing a particular affinity for Bach), etymology, mass communication, and computers. The pieces resonate with the underlying theme of the interconnected nature of Earth and all living things.

== Background ==
Lewis Thomas was a physician, immunology researcher, dean, poet, etymologist, and essayist. He attended Princeton University followed by Harvard Medical School. He was a research fellow at the Thorndyke Memorial laboratories, and a researcher at Tulane University and University of Minnesota. He was the head of the pathology department at New York University Medical School for fifteen years as well as the chair for the Department of Medicine at Bellevue Hospital. He became the dean of the New York University Medical School and later of Yale School of Medicine. Thomas began writing a monthly essay "Notes of a Biology Watcher" in the New England Journal of Medicine in 1971 while he was at Yale. In 1973 he became the president of the Sloan-Kettering Institute in New York.

Lewis Thomas published multiple books throughout his career, the first being The Lives of a Cell: Notes of a Biology Watcher. In 1979 he published The Medusa and the Snail: More Notes of a Biology Watcher. He wrote an autobiographical book in 1983, The Youngest Science: Notes of a Medicine-Watcher. Also in 1983 he published Late Night Thoughts on Listening to Mahler's Ninth Symphony followed by Could I Ask You Something? in 1985. In 1990 and 1992 Thomas published Et Cetera Et Cetera: Notes of a Word Watcher and The Fragile Species respectively.

The most influential writer to Thomas's writing style is Michel de Montaigne. He is quoted as saying "I cannot imagine anyone reading Montaigne carefully, paying attention, concentrating on what he has to say, without smiling most of the time".

== Summary ==
The Lives of a Cell

This essay focuses on how connected humanity is to nature and how we must make strides to understand our role. Thomas argues that even our own bodies are not solely ours since the mitochondria and other organelles are descended from other organisms. He creates a metaphor of the Earth as a giant cell itself with humans just as one part of a vast system.

Thoughts for a Countdown

Astronauts must be decontaminated before they are allowed to interact on Earth. Thomas states that this is an act of "human chauvinism." Most organisms on Earth are symbiotic or, if harmful, have both adapted to warn the other. All organisms on Earth are interdependent and a stray virus or bacteria from the Moon will not be adapted to harm lifeforms on Earth since it is not part of this connection. Bacteria are interconnected to the point where some cannot survive without others and some even live within others. We must recognize how interconnected even the smallest organisms are on Earth; especially if we must interact with life outside our planet.

On Societies as Organisms

Thomas introduces one of his key metaphors of humans behaving like ants. He suggests that this metaphor is not used because humans do not like to be compared to insects that, as a society, can function as an organism. There are many examples of animals acting as a large organism when in large groups from termites and slime molds to birds and fish. Thomas argues that the communication of results in science puts humans in the same model as these other species, as all scientists communicate and build on each other's work in order to explore that which we do not know.

A Fear of Pheromones

Humans fear pheromones because we believe we have gone above the basic secretion of chemicals in our communication. However, there are signs that point to humans relying on pheromones as well as our most technological forms of communication. Thomas shows pheromones in the animal world with examples of moths and fish. He then goes on to explain what impact pheromones in humans could have on the future such as in the perfume industry and finding histocompatible donors.

The Music of This Sphere

Music is the only form of communication that saves us from an overwhelming amount of small talk. This is not only a human phenomenon, but happens throughout the animal world. Thomas makes examples of animals from termites and earthworms to gorillas and alligators that perform some sort of rhythmic noise making that can be interpreted as music if we had full range of hearing. From the vast number of animals that participate in music it is clear that the need to make music is a fundamental characteristic of biology. Thomas proposes that the animal world is continuing a musical memory that has been going since the beginning of time.

An Earnest Proposal

Thomas argues that even though we have the technological advancements to destroy the Earth that we do not know near enough about the world in which we live. To solve this problem he suggests that we should not be able to fire nuclear weapons without being able to explain one living thing fully. The organism that Thomas proposes is the protozoan Myxotricha paradoxa. There is information known about this protozoan that lives in the digestive tract of Australian termites but with more study it could be a model for how our cells developed. It is seen throughout nature that organisms cooperate and progress into more complex forms. We cannot destroy vast amounts of Earth with nuclear weapons until we understand how interconnected we all are.

The Technology of Medicine

Thomas presents the three levels of technology in medicine: "nontechnology" that helps patients with diseases that are not well understood but does not help solve the underlying mechanisms of the disease, "halfway technology" that makes up for disease or postpones death for diseases whose courses we cannot do much about, and "high technology" that from understanding the mechanism of the disease we are now able to cure. When looking at the costs of the three different technologies they are all needed, but once a "high technology" is found for a disease the benefits outweigh the costs of studying the mechanism of the disease so thoroughly. Thomas suggests that in order to save money in health care, the highest priority in funding should be given to basic research.

Vibes

Humans leave a trace of chemicals in every place they go and on everything they touch. Other animals use signaling mechanisms to leave trails or identify each other. The sense of smell is an important sense in using these mechanisms, but it is still not well understood. Humans, compared to the rest of the animal world, do not have a good olfactory sense though we may be better than we first assume. Johannes Kepler once argued that the Earth is an immense organism itself, with chemical signals spreading across the globe through various organisms in order to keep the world functioning and well informed.

Ceti

Tau Ceti is a nearby sun-like star that we are on the verge of being able to begin making contact with, as well as other celestial bodies, to search for life. We have been attracted to the vast regions of space outside our Earth bubble and what they could hold. If extraterrestrial life is found, it scientifically would make sense, but the social impact of no longer being unique would give humans a new sense of community. The question of what information to send out is answered by Thomas by sending music, specifically Bach. It is timeless and the best language we have to express who we are. If possible Thomas also suggests sending art. However, the questions of what to send will not stop once we receive a reply.

The Long Habit

As humans we always avoid the topic of death, despite the fact that it is a natural part of our lives. When it is far removed, as in war or on television, we can discuss it without a problem. It is a subconscious effort that by not thinking about death we may continue to live. Nevertheless, even if we cured all diseases we still would die one day. We must not fear death and research the dying process just as we would any other biological process. Most people who have a near death experience do not recall any pain or fear. It is perhaps the loss of consciousness that people fear more than death itself.

Antaeus in Manhattan

Thomas returns to his pondering of the social behaviors of insects in this essay. He discusses the change in behavior of insects in groups and singular insects. We have used insects and their behavior to convey lessons, rules, and virtues and now they have been used in art. Thomas describes an art exhibit with living ants, surrounded by humans who act in a similar manner to the ants themselves.

The MBL

Thomas praises the Marine Biological Laboratory as "a paradigm, a human institution possessed of a life of its own, self-regenerating, touched all around by human meddle but consistently improved, embellished by it." It attracts the brightest minds and makes great strides in science autonomously. Thomas paints pictures with his description of scientists covering the beach with their diagrams and making "music" of discussion after a lecture at the MBL.

Autonomy

Humans have to learn how to walk, skip, and ride a bicycle but inside our bodies perform specific manipulations from birth that we do not need to learn. There is new research that suggests humans may be able to change these inner processes with teaching. Thomas reasons that his body has been functioning fine without him trying to control every little process so he will let it continue to do so. He suggests to try the exact opposite and try to disconnect from your body altogether.

Organelles as Organisms

The biologic revolution is filling in the gaps in understanding about how our cells function. As we begin to understand more about organelles, it becomes increasingly clear that they did not originate from our cells. Mitochondria and chloroplasts most likely have bacterial ancestry, and flagella and cilia were most likely once spirochetes. Cells do not necessarily have a controller-controlled relationship with their organelles, but rather one originating from their ancestors finding a simple way to stay protected and secure. Organisms have brought them along with us as they evolved, but even knowing this we are yet to understand them completely. Organelles and eukaryotic cells are one of the most established symbiotic relationships.

Germs

We treat bacteria as an ever-present enemy even though there are only a small number that actually cause disease, and by accident in most cases. Bacteria normally do not gain anything by causing illness or death in their hosts. Our illness is mostly caused by our immune system doing too great of a job in response to bacteria in our system. The strength of our response is not necessary for most cases, but remains from a primitive time.

Your Very Good Health

Health care has become the new name for medicine though this is a misnomer since illness and death cannot be totally eradicated. Thomas argues that to understand how medicine should be used we should look to those internists that are involved in the system. Most things get better in a short while by themselves, so we should no longer be instilling in the public a constant fear of failed health. This will be the best way to solve the problem of funding health care since people will only use it when it is necessary.

Social Talk

There are different degrees of social behavior in animals. However, it is not clear where humans fit on the scale. Most signs point that we are above the social behavior of ants and bees that go about a singular task as a whole community. Language is the one trait that brings us to the level of such animals. All humans engage in language and are born with the understanding of language. Language, and perhaps along with art and music, is the core of our social behavior.

Information

The human mind comes with the understanding of how to deal with and use language. We store up information as a cell stores energy, though with language, this information can be put to further use. Another main difference between language and other communication systems in biology is the ambiguity that is a necessity in language which would cause the other communication systems to fail.

Death in the Open

Death is not supposed to happen in the open, along highways and in sight of others. Everything is in the process of dying all around us, though we keep it hidden from our sight and minds. Death is part of the cycle and we need to understand we are part of a larger process. The process of dying is necessary for the birth of the new and we will all experience it together.

Natural Science

Thomas explains science as a wild manifestation of human behavior. He explains that science and discovery is a compulsion that scientists seem to have written in their very genes. Science cannot be organized and forced; it must be free to go where the next question leads. It is similar to a bee hive in some sense, but also to animals on a hunt. The activity is never ending and the conglomeration of minds always yearning for the next discovery cannot be kept under control.

Natural Man

How humans approach nature has been changing throughout recent years. We used to view nature as ours to control and use to better mankind. Now we have moved away from this view and seen that we are part of the larger system and not the ruler of it. However Thomas argues that we must see ourselves as "indispensable elements of nature" and work for the betterment of the Earth but also be able to protect ourselves.

The Iks

This essay focuses on the tribe of Iks in northern Uganda. Thomas comments on an anthropologist's report on the Iks that argues that they represent the basic elements of mankind. Thomas instead thinks that each Ik acts as a group and that by observing the whole tribe of Iks you can see how we behave in groups ranging from committees to nations. In order to improve upon our group interactions, we must stay human even when in masses.

Computers

Computers are approaching humanity, but they will never be able to fully replace us for they will not be able to replicate our collective behavior because we do not understand it ourselves. We are involved in a never ending transfer of information and collective thinking. This is the cause of the unpredictability in our future. The one problem with our information transfer is that we are much better at gaining information than giving output back.

The Planning of Science

Thomas explains in this essay his view on scientific funding and planning. He believes that research should be focused in basic science. Unlike basic science, disease problems do not have the right type of questions to allow for great discoveries. The distinguishing factor of basic science is that there can be an element of surprise that allows for even more discoveries to be made. It is difficult to organize plans for this type of surprise in research even though it may seem a better business model to do so. It is the improbability and maze of puzzles that occur in basic research that Thomas believes will lead us to the most knowledge.

Some Biomythology

Mythical creatures were created by our ancestors but even though we presently have no need for these beasts we continue to use them. The hybridization of animals in mythology is present from multiple ancient people such as the Ganesha, Griffon, Centaur, and Sphinx. Thomas suggests that perhaps we look to replace these mythological creatures which are more biological. He suggests the Myxotricha paradoxa, blepharisma, bacteria, and plant-animal combinations that are either made up of different organisms or set up joint endeavors with more than one organism to survive.

On Various Words

From Thomas's metaphor on how humans behave like ants, he again argues that language is the quality that best resembles social insects. Without any outside direction, humans continually change language. We build language like ants build their hill, without ever knowing what the final result is and how our minuscule changes affect any other part. Thomas explains how some words have changed and developed different meanings. Two words, gene and bheu, are two words that we have derived a great number of current words from. Their descended words: kind, nature, physics are related in the present but also in its ancestry.

Living Language

Thomas compares language to the social behavior of termites in this essay. He thinks of language as an organism that is alive and changing. The genes of language are how words originated when you look into each of their histories. He traces multiple words to their origins to prove his point. He comments that it would be near impossible to keep track of all roots of words back to Indo-European that you use.

On Probability and Possibility

We should be in awe that we exist and are unique among all the humans on Earth according to probability. Though we are indeed individual organisms, Thomas argues that one's own self is a myth. He believes we are part of a larger organization of information sharing. Through this system we are adapting and creating. By being more open with communication and less restrictive we will be able to uncover even more surprising discoveries.

The World's Biggest Membrane

Thomas compares the Earth to a living cell, one with its own membrane that allows it to keep out disorder. He shows how the evolution of cells was closely tied to the "breath" of the Earth, the cycling of oxygen concentration in the atmosphere. The atmosphere is "for sheer size and perfection of function, it is far and away the grandest product of collaboration in all of nature." It gives us the oxygen we need, protection from UV light, and protection from the millions of meteorites.

== Reception ==
Reviewers received The Lives of a Cell positively. Many praise Thomas's writing style for its effortless eloquence and wit. Joyce Carol Oates complimented the book not only for the style and language, but also for the vast amount of scientific information that Thomas conveys. It is a pleasure to read, wrote Laura Bernell, even to those who are not as well versed in the sciences. Even though the book consists of 29 essays that were originally published separately there is a pattern that is apparent throughout the book.

Not every reviewer was impressed by Thomas's writings, however. Though Thomas does use elaborate metaphors and smooth language in his writings, some thought that his underlying meaning did not hold up. C.P. Swanson wrote that even though the essays are enjoyable to read, it can be difficult to distinguish the hard scientific fact. Another reviewer, Susan Goldhor, commented that it was repetitive to read all the essays in the book at once, though spacing them out made them more enjoyable.

== Further impact ==
The Lives of a Cell has had multiple printings, been translated into eleven languages, and sold over 250,000 copies within five years of publishing. The Lives of the Cell is looked back on as the watershed book for writing on science. It is included in the "100 or so Books that Shaped a Century of Science" compiled by Philip Morrison and Phylis Morrison for American Scientist.

A reviewer, Douglas Kamerow, suggests that the themes in the book are perhaps even more relevant in the present than when the book was first published. The rapid improvement of technology in recent years opens up new ways that we can use science and language to improve our relationship with the Earth and among ourselves. It is also interesting to see Thomas's view of medicine of the time period since he experienced the beginning of infectious disease control with antibiotics which gave him perspective on other unknown medical areas in his time.

Beyond the impact of his writing on scientific prose, Lewis Thomas has been compared to other writers such as E.B. White, Thomas Jefferson, Henry David Thoreau, Muriel Rukeyser (Life of Poetry).

== Awards ==
The Lives of a Cell won the U.S. National Book Awards for "Arts and Letters" and "The Sciences" in 1975 (both awards were split). It is also ranked 11th on the Modern Library's "100 Best Nonfiction" books of the 20th century list.
