= The Medusa and the Snail =

1979 essays collection by Lewis Thomas

The Medusa and the Snail: More Notes of a Biology Watcher
- Author: Lewis Thomas
- Language: English
- Subject: Biology
- Published: 1979 (The Viking Press)
- Publication place: United States
- Media type: Print

The Medusa and the Snail: More Notes of a Biology Watcher is a 1979 collection of essays by the American science writer Lewis Thomas. It was published by Viking Press in 1979 and reissued by Penguin Books in 1995. Most of the essays in the book had first appeared in the New England Journal of Medicine. It is Thomas's second collection of short essays after Lives of a Cell.

The title essay is about the relationship between Nudibranch sea slug and the medusa of a jellyfish that inhabit the Bay of Naples. It explores how the relationship between the two creatures can be seen as illustrating the impossibility of understanding the notion of the self.

The book also includes the essay "On Transcendental Metaworry" which discusses enlightenment and worrying.

== Reception ==
The Medusa and the Snail won a National Book Award in 1981 in the category of Science - Paperback.

Maria Popova wrote that the title essay "explored the confounding nature of the self with uncommon insight and originality" and that Thomas's essays "remain among the finest, most insightful writing I have ever savored".

It was reviewed by Richard Boston for the British New Scientist magazine in 1979. Boston wrote that "Thomas is a wonderful writer...his writing is always informed by a sense of wonder at the Universe and its contents" "Thomas is a wonderful writer. Which leaves me pondering another mystery. Why is his work so little known in Britain?".

In their review of The Medusa and the Snail, Kirkus Reviews wrote that "Thomas' unexpected turns of phrase and love of words and their origins is revealed again and again...Read Thomas for his estimable style—often disarmingly simple, even colloquial—and the wit and insight into life and medicine his writing embodies". Joel Hedgpeth, reviewing the book in The Quarterly Review of Biology, described Thomas as an "...adroit, accomplished writer with a pleasing style but inevitably his hit-and-run gives the feeling he does not always think it through" but concluded that "he says many wise and interesting things"...it is obvious his ideal is Montaigne and he has learned his lesson well.

== Contents ==
- "The Medusa and the Snail"
- "The Tucson Zoo"
- "The Youngest and Brightest Thing Around"
- "On Magic in Medicine"
- "The Wonderful Mistake"
- "Ponds"
- "To Err is Human"
- "The Selves"
- "The Health-Care System"
- "On Cloning a Human Being"
- "On Etymons and Hybrids"
- "The Hazards of Science"
- "On Warts"
- "On Transcendental Metaworry (TMW)"
- "An Apology"
- "On Disease"
- "On Natural Death"
- "A Trip Abroad"
- "On Meddling"
- "On Committees"
- "The Scrambler in the Mind"
- "Notes on Punctuation"
- "The Deacon's Masterpiece"
- "How to Fix the Premedical Curriculum"
- "A Brief Historical Note on Medical Economics"
- "Why Montaigne is Not a Bore"
- "On Thinking About Thinking"
- "On Embryology"
- "Medical Lessons from History"
