= Abigail Thomas =

American writer (born 1941)

Abigail Thomas (born 1941) is an American novelist, poet, and memoirist.

== Early life ==
Born in Boston in 1941, Abigail Thomas is the daughter of Lewis Thomas, an essayist, poet, physician and scientist, and Beryl Dawson. Thomas is one of three sisters. The family moved at two-year intervals to follow Dr. Thomas's career, which led to Thomas attending 11 schools by the 10th grade.

Thomas married at 18 and became pregnant, resulting in her expulsion from Bryn Mawr College in 1959, when she was told by the dean that "her education was obviously over." Thomas had three children by the age of 23. Thomas worked as a secretary and a real estate agent. Eight years into her first marriage, she and her children moved in with her parents in New York. Thomas was 27 when she married her second husband, a physicist 11 years her senior, with whom she had one child. Thomas became a literary agent at Viking Press, working in that capacity until 1992.

== Author ==
Although she had written poetry before, Thomas did not seriously write prose until the age of 48. Her short stories have been published in magazines, including The Missouri Review, Columbia (Columbia University), Paris Review, O, The Oprah Magazine, and Glimmer Train. Newspapers, including the New York Times and the Washington Post have published essays by Thomas. Her early books were written for children. Later books by Thomas focus on accounts of and observations on her life and those around her, with reviewers noting her focus on memoir in a series of vignettes. Safekeeping (2000) describes her marriage to, divorce from, and continuing friendship with her second husband, told in both the third and first person. A Three Dog Life (2006) describes events from her life, including the accident and subsequent disability that befell her third husband Richard Rogin, and her meditations on those events.

What Comes Next and How to Like it (2015) concerns Thomas's move from New York City to Woodstock, New York to be closer to Rogin's care facility, her friendship with her colleague Chuck Verrill, to whom the book is dedicated, Verrill's relationship with Thomas's daughter Catherine, and Catherine's illness and recovery. Still Life at Eighty (2023) continues observations on Thomas's life in Woodstock, on writing, and on aging, all using a series of short vignettes focusing on individual days, events, or closely-observed themes.

Thomas's awards include the William Peden Prize for fiction. Her book A Three Dog Life was chosen by both the New York Times and the Los Angeles Times as one of the best books of 2006. She has taught writing at New School University and Queens University.

== Personal life ==
Thomas married her third husband, Richard Rogin in 1988.

Daughter Catherine Luttinger is an author.

Thomas lives in Woodstock, New York.

== Works ==
=== Children's books ===
- Wake Up, Wilson Street (1993)
- Pearl Paints (1994)
- Lily (1994)

=== Short story collections and books ===
- Getting Over Tom: Stories (1994)
- An Actual Life (1996, novel)
- Herb's Pajamas (1998, short story collection)
- Safekeeping: Some True Stories from a Life (2000, memoir)
- Thinking About Memoir
- A Three Dog Life (2006, memoir)
- What Comes Next and How to Like It (2015, memoir)
- Still Life at Eighty (2023, memoir)

=== Writing exercises ===
- Two Pages (2013, assignment suggestions for writing exercises)
