= Marine Biological Laboratory =

Research institution in Massachusetts, US

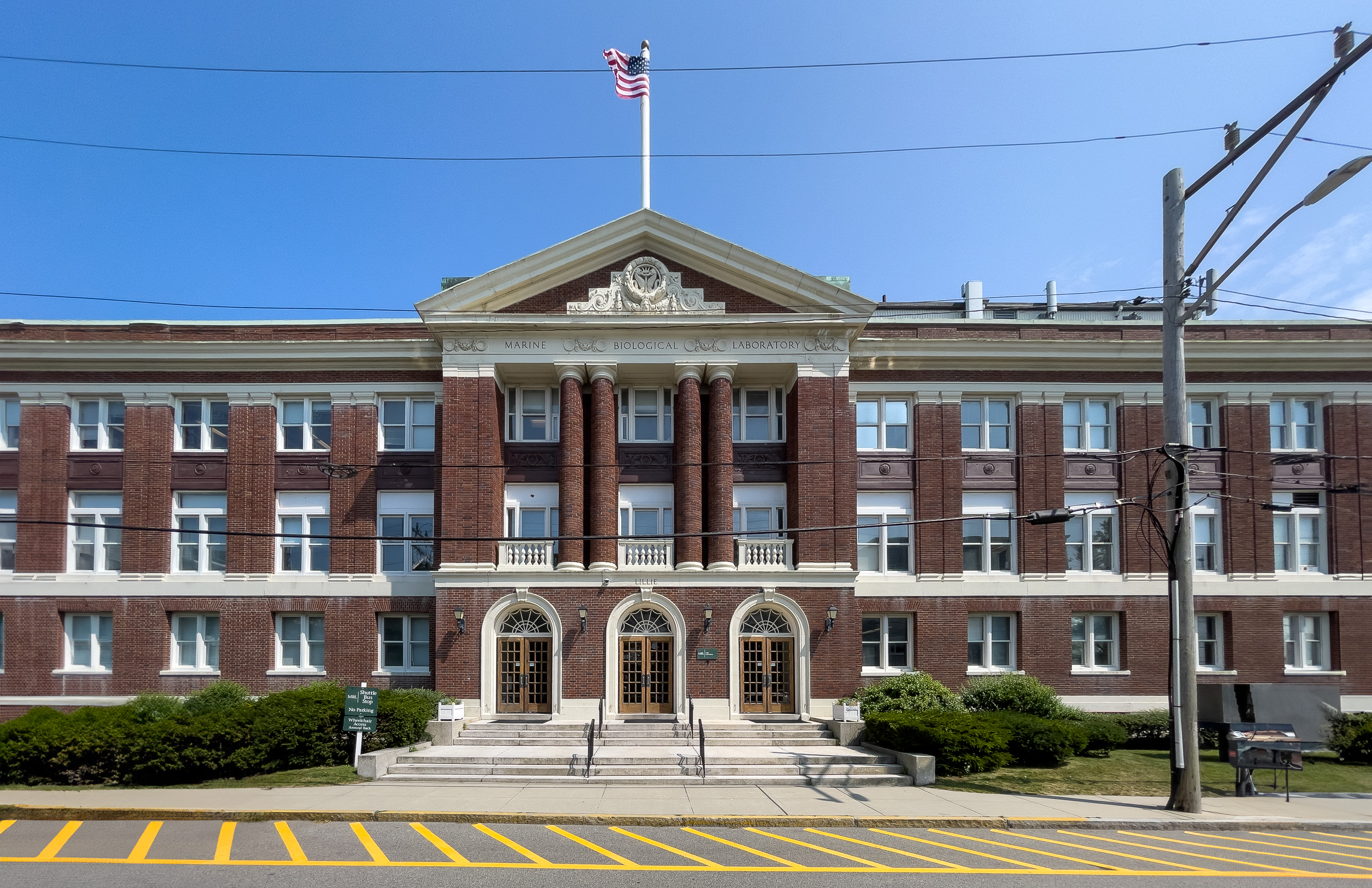
- Lillie Laboratory
- Nickname: MBL
- Established: 1888
- Research type: Pure and applied research
- Field of research: Biology
- Director: Nipam Patel
- Location: 7 MBL Street, Woods Hole, Massachusetts, 02543-1015, United States; 41°31′34.40″N 70°40′22.40″W
- Website: mbl.edu

The Marine Biological Laboratory (MBL) is a research institution for biological and environmental sciences in Woods Hole, Massachusetts, United States.

MBL was founded in 1888 as a private, nonprofit institution. It was overseen by the University of Chicago from July 1, 2013, and returned to independent status on July 1, 2026. As of 2024, 63 Nobel Prize winners have been affiliated with MBL as students, faculty members, or researchers. In addition, since 1960, there have been 137 Howard Hughes Medical Institute investigators, early career scientists, international researchers, and professors; 319 members of the National Academy of Sciences; and 260 Members of the American Academy of Arts and Sciences who have been affiliated with the lab.

== History ==
=== 19th century ===
The Marine Biological Laboratory grew from the vision of several Bostonians and Spencer Fullerton Baird, the United States' first Fish Commissioner (a government official concerned with the use of fisheries). Baird had set up a United States Fish Commission research station in Woods Hole in 1882, and had ambitions to expand it into a major laboratory. He invited Alpheus Hyatt to move his marine biology laboratory and school which he had founded at the Norwood-Hyatt House in Annisquam, Massachusetts, to Woods Hole. Inspired by Harvard biologist Louis Agassiz's short-lived experimental summer school, the Anderson School of Natural History on Penikese Island, off the coast of Woods Hole, Hyatt accepted the offer. With $10,000 raised by the Woman's Education Association of Boston and the Boston Society of Natural History, land was purchased, a building was erected, and the MBL was incorporated with Hyatt as the first president of the board of trustees. The Fish Commission supplied crucial support, including marine organisms and running sea water.

Facilities in 1899

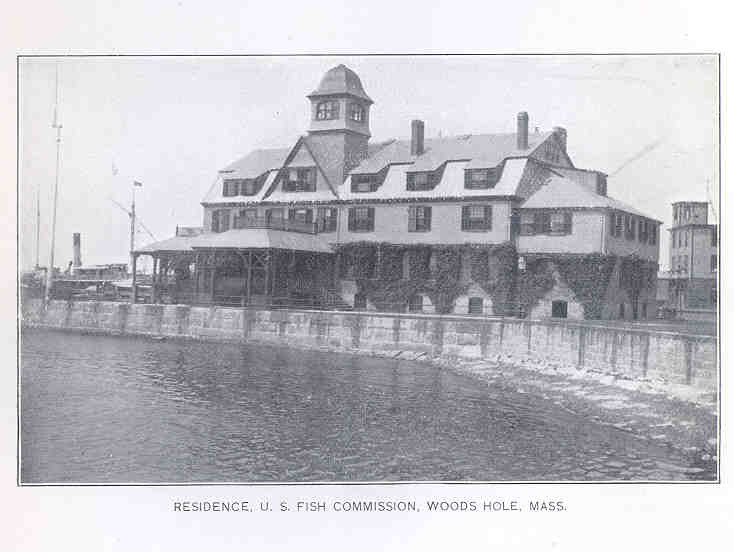
The residence

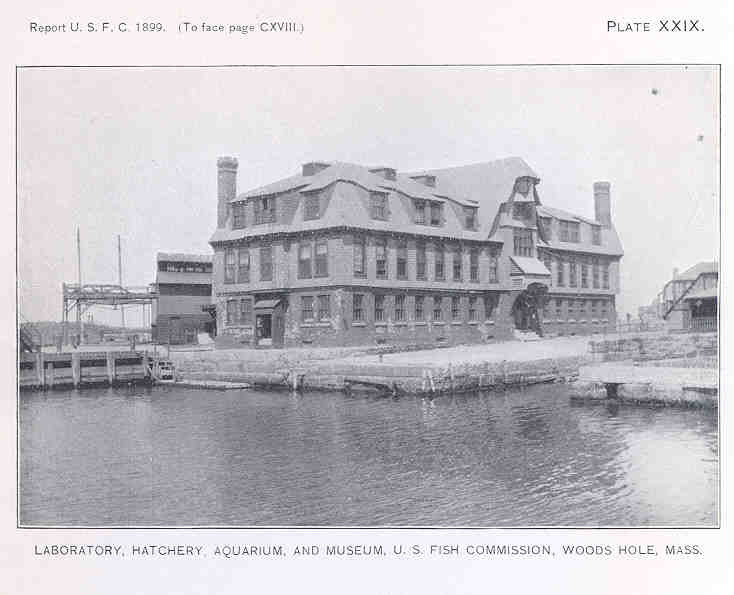
The laboratory, hatchery, aquarium, and museum

University of Chicago professor, Charles Otis Whitman, an embryologist, was retained to also serve as the first director of the MBL. Whitman believed "other things being equal, the investigator is always the best instructor," and emphasized the need to combine research and education at the new laboratory. The MBL's first summer course provided a six-week introduction to invertebrate zoology; facilities for visiting summer investigators were also offered.

The MBL Library was established in 1889, with scientist and future MBL trustee Cornelia Clapp serving as librarian. In 1899, the MBL began publishing The Biological Bulletin, a scientific journal that is still edited at the MBL.

Gertrude Stein, later well known as a novelist and art collector, took part in MBL's Embryology course in the summer of 1897, while her brother Leo took part in the Invertebrates course.

=== 20th century ===
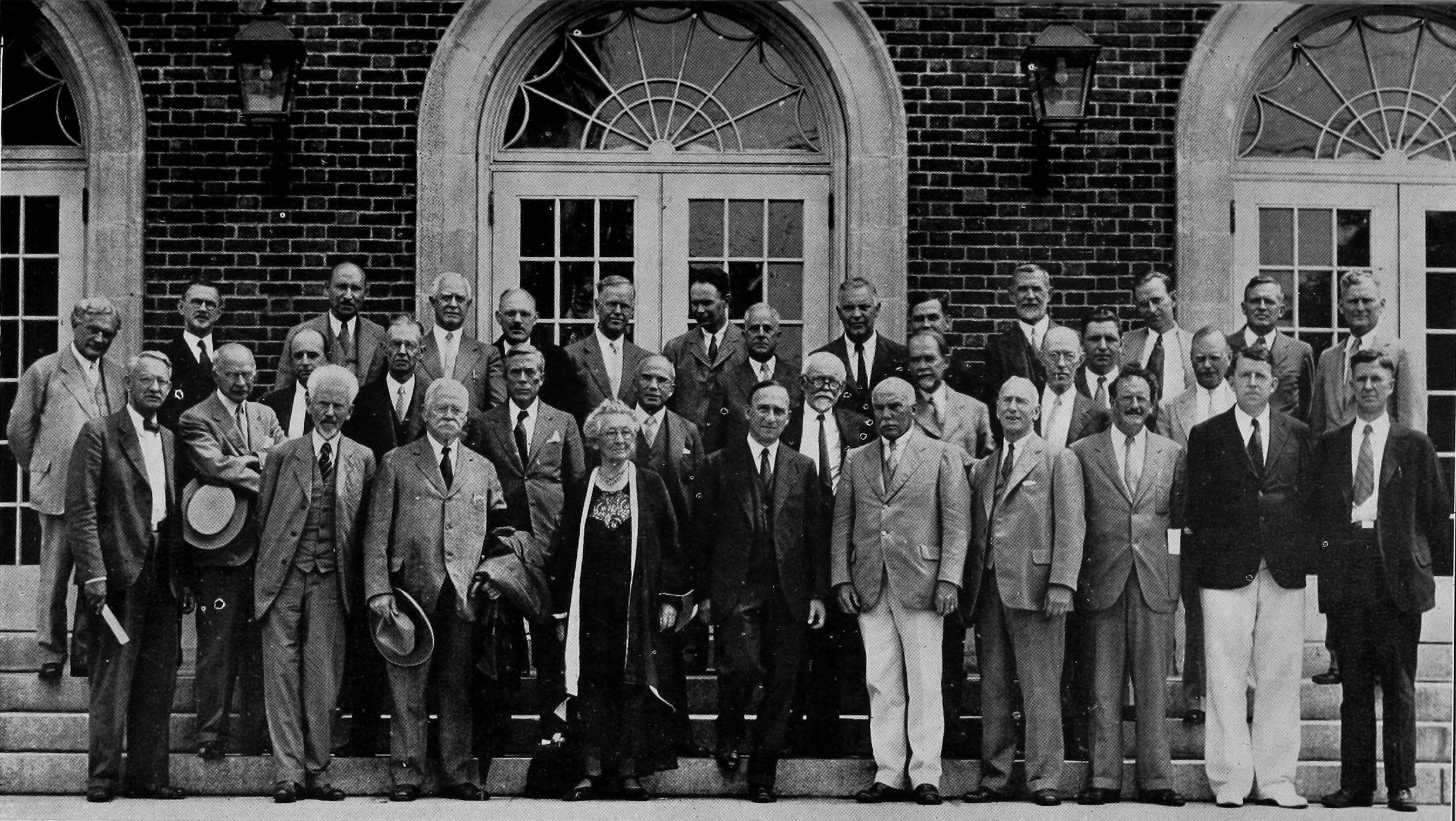
The trustees of the Marine Biological Laboratory in 1934. The lone woman, Cornelia Clapp, stands near the center of the front row.

Writing in 1972, Lewis Thomas both explained and praised the nature of the MBL as a scientific institution. He wrote about it in his recurring New England Journal of Medicine column called "Notes of a Biology-Watcher", in an installment called "The MBL"; the essay was later collected into the volume titled The Lives of a Cell: Notes of a Biology Watcher. He said of the MBL of that day, "Today, it stands as the uniquely national center for biology in this country; it is the National Biological Laboratory without being officially designated (or yet funded) as such. Its influence on the growth and development of biologic science has been equivalent to that of many of the country's universities combined, for it has had its pick of the world's scientific talent for each summer's research and teaching. [...] Someone has counted thirty Nobel Laureates who have worked at the MBL at one time or another. It is amazing that such an institution, exerting so much influence on academic science, has been able to remain so absolutely autonomous. It has, to be sure, linkages of various kinds, arrangements with outside universities for certain graduate programs, and it adheres delicately, somewhat ambiguously, to the Woods Hole Oceanographic Institution just up the street. But it has never come under the domination of any outside institution or governmental agency, nor has it ever been told what to do by any outside group. [...] There is no way of predicting what the future will be like for an institution such as the MBL. One way or another, it will evolve. It may shift soon into a new phase, with a year-round program for teaching and research and a year-round staff, but it will have to accomplish this without jeopardizing the immense power of its summer programs, or all institutional hell will break loose. It will have to find new ways for relating to the universities, if its graduate programs are to expand as they should. It will have to develop new symbiotic relations with the Oceanographic Institute, since both places have so much at stake. And it will have to find more money, much more—the kind of money that only federal governments possess—without losing any of its own initiative. It will be an interesting place to watch, in the years ahead."

In 1927, Roger Arliner Young became the first African-American woman to perform research at the institution.

=== 21st century ===
Facilities in 2023

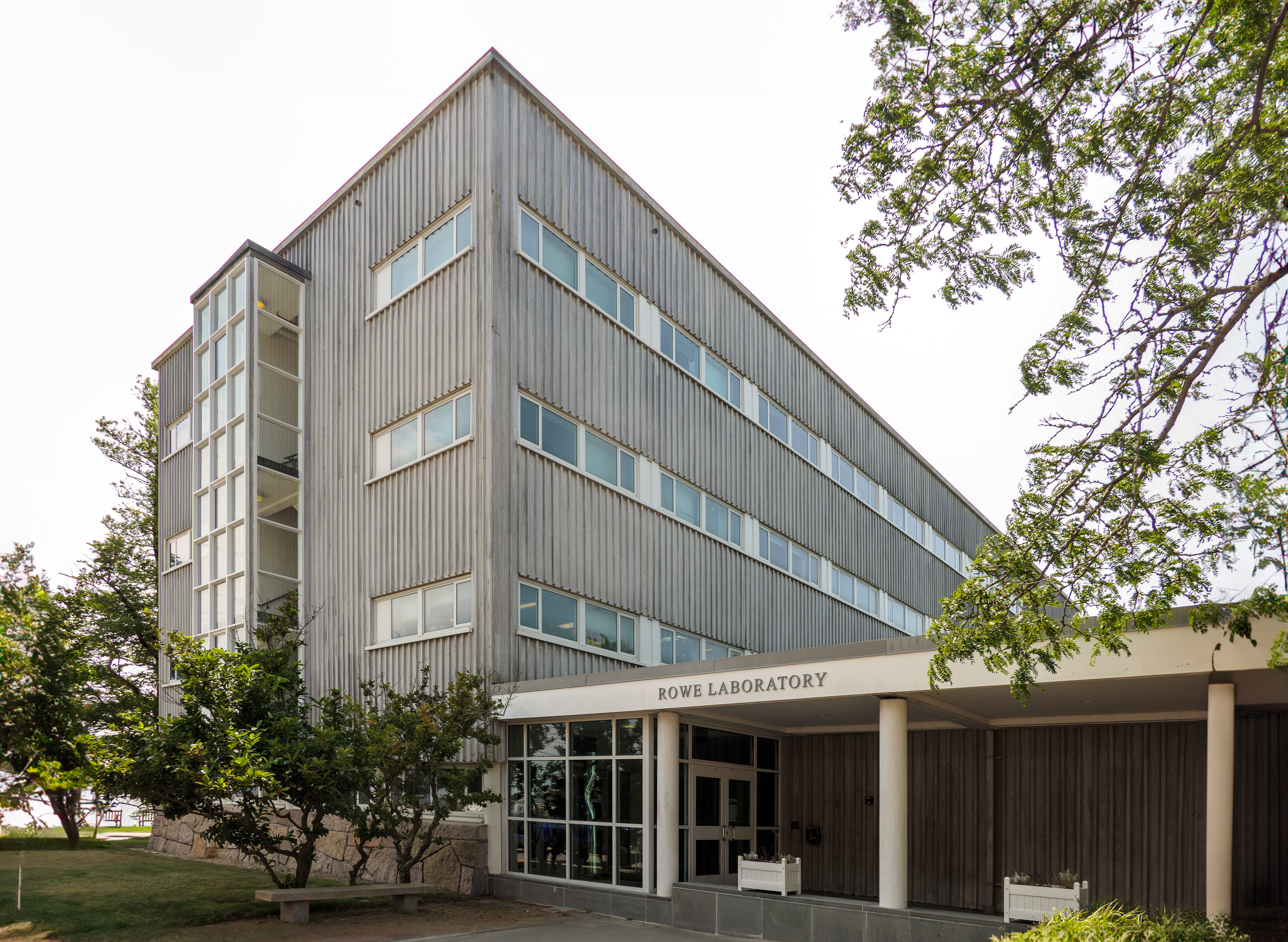
Rowe Laboratory

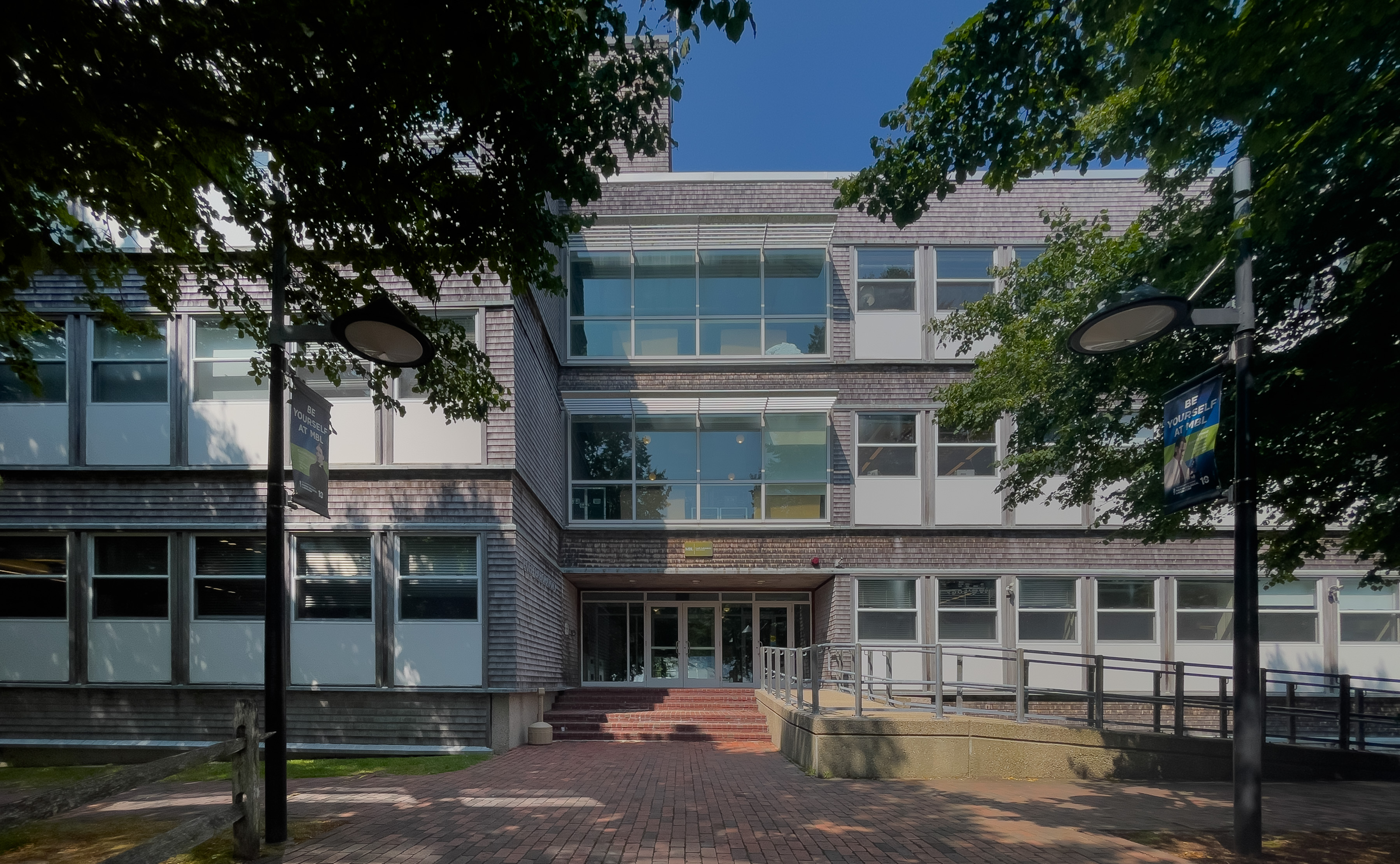
Loeb Laboratory

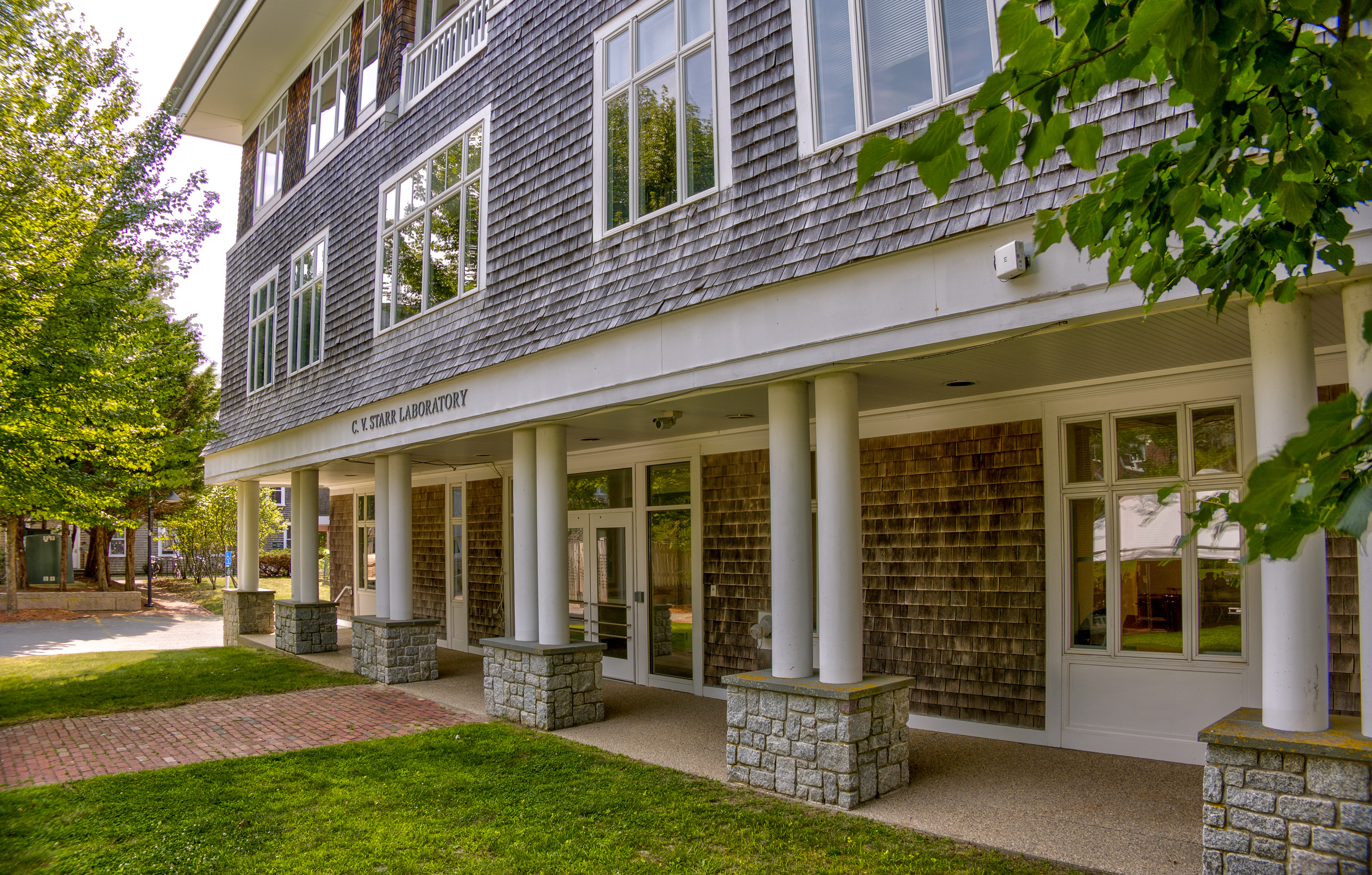
C.V. Starr Laboratory

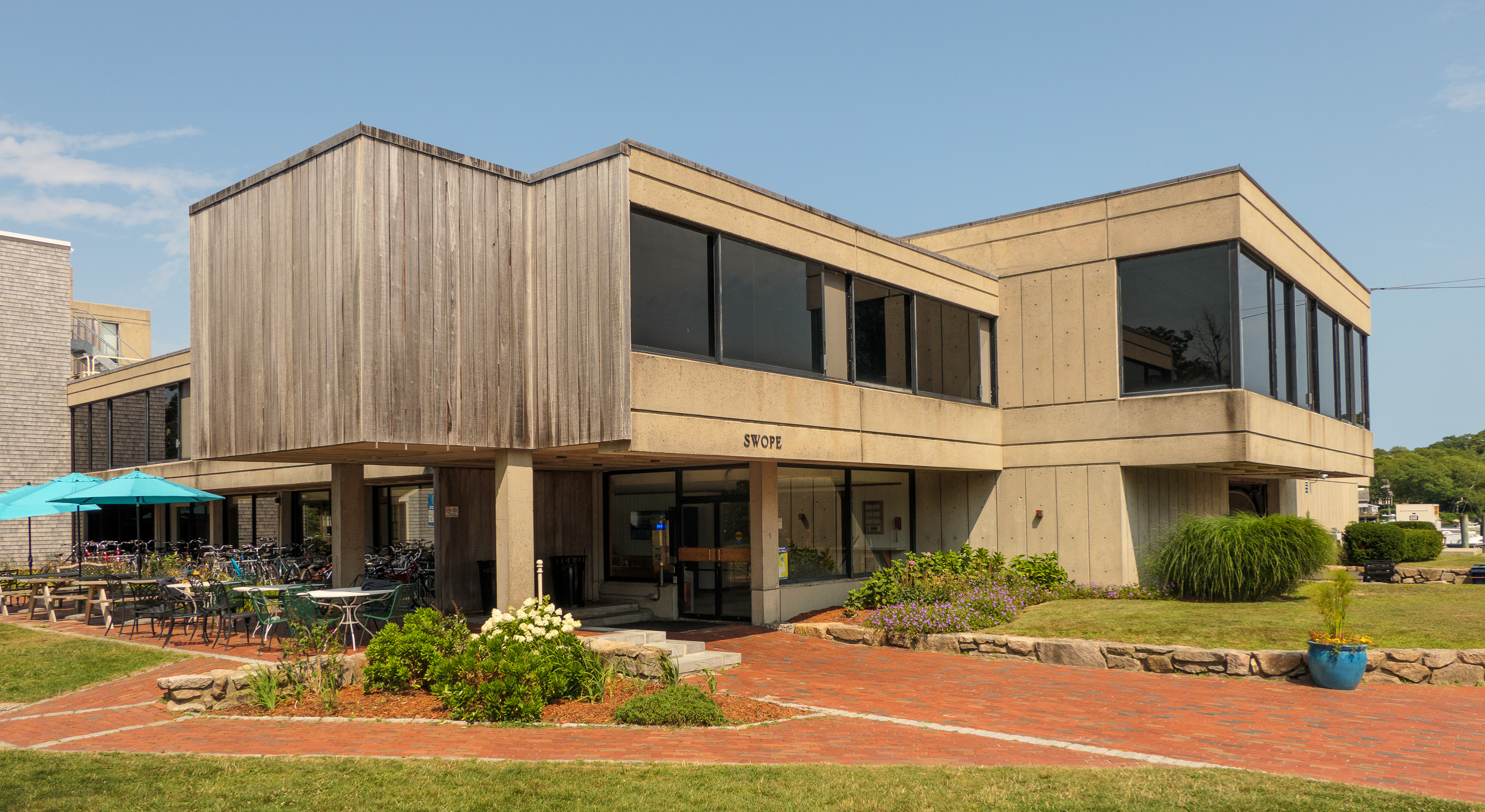
Swope Building (residences)

The MBL became formally affiliated with the University of Chicago on July 1, 2013. In order to further scientific research and education, the affiliation built on historical ties with the university, as MBL was led by University of Chicago faculty members in its first four decades. The Laboratory returned to independent status in 2026.

In September 2018, Nipam Patel became director of the Marine Biological Laboratory, succeeding Huntington F. Willard.

== Research ==
=== Staff ===
The MBL has approximately 250 year-round employees, about half of which are scientists and scientific support staff. They are joined each year by more than 500 visiting scientists, summer staff, and research associates from hundreds of institutions around the world, as well as a large number of faculty and students participating in MBL courses (in 2024, 550 students from 273 institutions and 58 countries).

=== Facilities ===
The MBL's resident research centers are the Eugene Bell Center for Regenerative Biology and Tissue Engineering, the Ecosystems Center, and the Josephine Bay Paul Center for Comparative Molecular Biology and Evolution. Visiting scientists are affiliated with the MBL's Whitman Center. Whitman Center Scientists comprise more than 100 principal investigators from academic institutions around the world. Other resources include The Marine Resources Center, an advanced facility for maintaining, culturing, and providing aquatic and marine organisms essential to biological, biomedical, and ecological research; and The National Xenopus Resource, which breeds and maintains Xenopus (frog) genetic stocks; and provides training in Xenopus husbandry, cell biology, imaging, genetics, transgenesis, and genomics.

The MBL shares a library, the MBLWHOI Library, with Woods Hole Oceanographic Institution. The MBLWHOI Library holds print and electronic collections in the biological, biomedical, ecological, and oceanographic sciences, and houses a growing archival collection, including photograph and videos from the MBL's history. The library also conducts digitization and informatics projects.

=== Research ===
Research at the MBL focuses on four themes:

- fundamental biological research, often using marine organisms as novel model systems, encompassing research in regenerative biology, neuroscience, sensory physiology, and comparative evolution and genomics;
- the study of microbiomes and microbial diversity and ecology in a variety of ocean and terrestrial habitats;
- imaging and computation;
- ecosystems science and climate change, and organismal adaptation to changing environments.

==== Cell, developmental, and reproductive biology ====
Cell, developmental, and reproductive biology have been a central part of the MBL's programs since the 1890s. Important discoveries in these fields at the MBL reach back to 1899, when Jacques Loeb demonstrated artificial parthenogenesis in sea urchin eggs; to 1905, when Edwin Grant Conklin first identified egg cytoplasmic regions that are programmed to form certain tissues or organs; to 1916, when Frank Rattray Lillie identified circulating hormones that influence sexual differentiation (Lillie, 1944). In the MBL's first two decades, cytologists Edmund Beecher Wilson, Nettie Stevens and others made connections between the chromosomes and Mendelian heredity, while Wilson's colleague at both the MBL and Columbia University, Thomas Hunt Morgan, launched the field of experimental genetics (Pauly, 2000:158). Keith R. Porter, considered by many to be a founder of modern cell biology due to his pioneering work on the fine structure of cells, including the discovery of microtubules, carried out research at the MBL starting in 1937 and directed the laboratory from 1975-77 (Barlow et al., 1993: 95-115).

The MBL is also a proving ground for new technologies in microscopy and imaging. MBL Distinguished Scientist Osamu Shimomura, who joined the MBL in 1983, was awarded the 2008 Nobel Prize in Chemistry for his discovery of green fluorescent protein (GFP) in the early 1960s, which led to the development of revolutionary techniques for imaging live cells and their components. Resident Distinguished Scientist Shinya Inoué's innovations in polarized light microscopy and video imaging since the 1950s have been instrumental in clarifying the cellular events of mitosis, including his discovery of the spindle fibers.

In the early 1980s, Tim Hunt, Joan Ruderman and others at the MBL identified the first of a class of proteins that regulate the cycle of cell division (cyclin). Hunt was awarded a Nobel Prize in 2001 for this work (Hunt, 2004). In 1984, Ron Vale, Michael Sheetz, Joe DeGiorgis, and others discovered kinesin, a motor protein involved in mitosis and other cellular processes, during summer MBL research. Vale, Sheetz, and James Spudich received the 2012 Lasker Award for Basic Medical Research for their discoveries related to molecular motors. In 1991 Israeli scientist Avram Hershko began coming to the MBL to study the role that the protein ubiquitin plays in cell division. In 2004, Hershko won a Nobel Prize for his work to establish the basic mechanism of ubiquitin-mediated protein degradation.

A large portion of the leading developmental biologists in the United States, both historically and today, have participated in the MBL's Embryology Course as directors, lecturers or students. One draw is the Woods Hole location and the availability of marine organisms, particularly the sea urchin, that are ideal for embryological analysis because they shed nearly transparent eggs which are fertilized and develop externally. In the first decades after the course was founded in 1893, its faculty pioneered research directions that remain central today, including the study of cytoplasmic localization in eggs; embryonic cell lineage (important in modern stem cell research); and evolutionary developmental biology (today called 'evo devo'). Some distinguished embryologists who have directed or co-directed the course are:

- Charles Otis Whitman (1893–1895)
- Frank Rattray Lillie (1896–1903)
- Viktor Hamburger (1942–1945)
- James D. Ebert (1962–1966)
- Eric H. Davidson (1972–1974; 1988–1996)
- Rudolf Raff (1980–1982) (see Davidson, 1993)
- Michael Levine (1992–1996)
- Marianne Bronner (1997–2001)
- Alejandro Sánchez Alvarado and Richard Behringer (2012–2016)
- Carole LaBonne (2020–present)

==== Regenerative biology and medicine ====
In 2010, the MBL established the Eugene Bell Center for Regenerative Biology and Tissue Engineering, where researchers study the ability of marine and other animals to spontaneously regenerate damaged or aging body parts. An understanding of tissue and organ regeneration in lower animals holds promise for translation to treatments for human conditions, including spinal cord injury, diabetes, organ failure, and degenerative neural diseases such as Alzheimer's. A cornerstone of the Bell Center is a national resource for research on the frog, Xenopus, which is a major animal model used in U.S. biomedical research. The National Xenopus Resource at the MBL is funded by the National Institutes of Health (MBL Facts).

==== Neuroscience, neurobiology, and sensory physiology ====
The MBL's contributions to neuroscience and sensory physiology are significant, fostered today by more than 65 visiting investigators and resident researchers in these fields, as well as five graduate- and post-graduate level Advanced Research Training courses. The MBL has been a magnet for the discipline since L.W. Williams in 1910 discovered, and John Zachary Young in 1936 rediscovered, the squid giant axon, a nerve fiber that is 20 times larger in diameter than the largest human axon. Young brought this locally abundant, ideal experimental system to the attention of his MBL colleague KS Cole, who in 1938 used it to record the resistance changes underlying the action potential, which provided evidence that ions flowing across the axonal membrane generate this electrical impulse. In 1938, Alan Lloyd Hodgkin came to the MBL to learn about the squid giant axon from Cole. After World War II, Hodgkin and Andrew Huxley, working in Plymouth, England and using the voltage clamp technique developed by Cole, laid the basis for the modern understanding of electrical activity in the nervous system by measuring quantitatively the flow of ions across the axonal membrane. Hodgkin and Huxley received the Nobel Prize in 1963 for their description of the ionic basis of nerve conduction (Barlow et al., 1993: 151-172). Following on Hodgkin and Huxley's work, in the 1960s and 1970s Clay Armstrong and other MBL researchers described a number of the properties of the ion channels that allow sodium and potassium ions to carry electric current across the cell membrane and Rodolfo Llinas described the transmission properties at the squid giant synapse (Llinas 1999). The "scientific career" of the "Woods Hole squid", Doryteuthis (formerly Loligo) pealeii, continues today, with studies on axonal transport, the squid giant synapse, squid genomics, and the molecular mechanisms of Alzheimer's disease.

Other marine organisms draw neuroscientists and neurobiologists to the MBL each summer, where a history of research into sensory physiology and behavior has been established. Haldan Keffer Hartline, an MBL summer investigator in the 1920s and early 1930s, uncovered several basic mechanisms of photoreceptor function through his studies on the horseshoe crab. Hartline shared the 1967 Nobel Prize with summer MBL colleague George Wald, who described the molecular basis of photoreception by showing that the light-sensitive rhodopsin consists of retinal, a slightly modified form of vitamin A, coupled to a photoreceptor protein. Another long-term summer investigator, Stephen W. Kuffler, is credited with "founding" the science of neurobiology in the mid-1960s at Harvard Medical School and he also initiated instruction in neurobiology at the MBL (Barlow et al., 1993:175-234; 203-234). Albert Szent-Györgyi (Nobel Laureate in 1937) conducted research at the MBL from 1947 to 1986, most significantly on the biochemical nature of muscular contraction. In the 1950s and 1960s, Frederik Bang and Jack Levin at the MBL discovered that the blood of the horseshoe crab clotted when exposed to bacterial endotoxins even in vanishingly small amounts. From this basic research, a reagent, Limulus amoebocyte lysate (LAL), was developed that can detect minute amounts of bacterial toxins. The LAL test has resulted in dramatic improvement in the quality of drugs and biological products for intravenous injection.

==== Ecosystems science ====
Ecosystems research became a year-round commitment at the MBL in 1962 with the founding of the Systematics-Ecology program, under the direction of Melbourne R. Carriker. In 1975, the MBL's Ecosystems Center was established, with George Woodwell as director. The original research focus was on the global carbon cycle, an emphasis maintained today. The Ecosystems Center has a year-round staff of more than 40 scientists who study a variety of ecosystems and their responses to human activities and environmental changes. The center is located in Woods Hole yet has a global reach, with active research sites in the Arctic tundra; in forest, coastal and marine sites in New England, Sweden and Brazil. The Ecosystems Center is home to two of the 26 U.S. Long Term Ecological Research (LTER) sites: Toolik Lake, Alaska; and Plum Island, Massachusetts. Scientists in the Ecosystems Center study the effects of forest clearance and land-use change on atmospheric chemistry, watershed processes and coastal ecology, the global-scale anthropogenic enrichment of the nitrogen cycle, and ecosystem responses to global warming. The interim director of the Ecosystems Center is Anne Giblin. Former directors of the Center who are still active on the scientific staff are Jerry Melillo, who studies the biogeochemistry of terrestrial ecosystems, and John Hobbie, a microbial ecologist. The Ecosystems Center is founded on a vision of collaborative, interdisciplinary science; shared lab facilities and instrumentation; and a long-term, large-scale, systems-wide view of ecosystem processes.

==== Comparative genomics, molecular evolution, and microbial ecology ====
The Josephine Bay Paul Center for Comparative Molecular Biology and Evolution was founded at the MBL in 1997 and is currently directed by David Mark Welch. By comparing diverse genomes, scientists at the center are elucidating the evolutionary relationships of biological systems, and describing genes and genomes of biomedical and environmental significance. Microorganisms found in a wide range of ecosystems, including the human microbiome, are studied. Mitchell Sogin, the Bay Paul Center's founder, also founded two courses at the MBL: the Workshop in Molecular Evolution; and Strategies and Techniques for Analyzing Microbial Population Structures. In 2003–2004, Sogin launched the International Census of Marine Microbes, a global effort to describe the biodiversity of marine micro-organisms. Early results from this census in 2006 revealed some 10 to 100 times more types of marine microbes than expected, and the vast majority are previously unknown, low-abundance microorganisms now called the "rare biosphere". Other Bay Paul Center projects are focused on microbes that live in extreme environments, from hydrothermal vents to highly acidic ecosystems, which may lead to a better understanding of life that could exist on other planets. Activities at the Bay Paul Center are supported by advanced DNA sequencing and other genomics equipment at the center's Keck Ecological and Evolutionary Genetics Facility.

== Education program ==
The MBL offers a range of courses, workshops, conferences, and internships throughout the year. Central to its programs are more than 20 Advanced Research Training Courses, graduate-level courses in topics ranging from physiology, embryology, neurobiology, and microbiology to imaging and computation integrated with biological research.

In addition, the MBL hosts courses for undergraduate and graduate students from the University of Chicago and other colleges and universities, as well as workshops and conferences—accommodating more than 2,600 participants in 2016.

== See also ==
- University of Chicago
- Cold Spring Harbor Laboratory
- Scripps Institution of Oceanography
- Catherine N. Norton
- Statue of Rachel Carson
- Cornelia Clapp
