= Catherine N. Norton =

American academic

Catherine Norton
- Born: January 24, 1941
- Died: December 22, 2014 (aged 73)
- Education: Regis College; Simmons University
- Occupation: Librarian

Catherine Norton (née Norris; January 24, 1941 – December 22, 2014) was an American librarian. She was the first Director of Information Systems at the Marine Biological Laboratory (MBL).

== Career ==
She received her education at Regis College and Simmons College (Master's degree, Information Science, 1984). She began working at the MBL/Woods Hole Oceanographic Institution Library in 1980, and in 1991 was made head of information services. She supported both digital libraries and open access. By 1994, she was the director of the library and led a program that became the basis for the first "Encyclopedia of Life" project. The idea behind the project was to enable medical researchers to utilize technology and to collect biomedical data in an easily shareable format and Norton served as one of the collaborators.

The MBL designed tools for Web site delivery and worked with partners at Harvard, the Field Museum of Natural History and the Smithsonian Institution to organize the project. Norton also published information about the project for other libraries to understand both its scope and how to utilize the information.

Norton had been consultant to the National Library of Medicine, and president of the Boston Library Consortium. She was also a member of the Falmouth School Committee, and Falmouth representative to the Steamship Authority's Board of Governors. She and her husband Thomas J. Norton had four children, Margaret, Michael, Kerrie, and Thomas.

== Other ==
In 2014 the Catherine N. Norton Fellowship at the Marine Biological Laboratory was established to cover "approved expenses" for a student or "early year fellow".

Norton was a Justice of the Peace for almost four decades, marrying many happy couples on the beaches and back porches of Cape Cod.

== Death ==
Catherine N. Norton died in Falmouth, Massachusetts, aged 73, after a battle with cancer.

== Selected works ==
- Norton, Cathy; Remsen, David P.; Patterson, David J. (March 2006). "Taxonomic Informatics Tools for the Electronic Nomenclator Zoologicus". Biological Bulletin. 210 (1): 18–24. doi:10.2307/4134533. hdl:1912/1033. JSTOR 4134533. PMID 16501061. S2CID 29466948.
- Norton, Cathy; Leary, Patrick R.; Remsen, David P.; Patterson, David J.; Sarkar, Indra Neil (June 2007). "uBioRSS: Tracking taxonomic literature using RSS". Bioinformatics. 23 (11): 1434–36. doi:10.1093/bioinformatics/btm109. hdl:1912/1539. PMID 17392332.
- Norton, Cathy; Sarkar, Indra Neil; Schenk, Ryan (February 2008). "Exploring historical trends using taxonomic name metadata". BMC Evolutionary Biology. 8 (1): 144. Bibcode:2008BMCEE...8..144S. doi:10.1186/1471-2148-8-144. PMC 2408592. PMID 18477399.
- Norton, Cathy (August 4, 2008). "The Encyclopedia of Life, Biodiversity Heritage Library, Biodiversity Informatics and Beyond Web 2.0". First Monday. 13 (8). doi:10.5210/fm.v13i8.2226. hdl:1912/2391.
- Norton, Cathy; Sarkar, Indra Neil; Schenk, Ryan; Miller, Holly (January 2009). "LigerCat: Using "MeSH Clouds" from Journal, Article, or Gene Citations to Facilitate the Identification of Relevant Biomedical Literature". Annual Symposium Proceedings: 563–67.
- Norton, Cathy; Miller, Holly; Sarkar, Indra Neil (July 2009). "GenBank and PubMed: How connected are they?". BMC Research Notes. 2: 101. doi:10.1186/1756-0500-2-101. PMC 2704225. PMID 19508734.
- Norton, Cathy; Rinaldo, Constance (August 2009). "BHL, The Biodiversity Heritage Library: An Expanding International Collaboration". Nature Precedings. doi:10.1038/npre.2009.3620.1.
- Norton, Cathy; Akella, Lakshmi Manohar; Miller, Holly (August 2012). "NetiNeti: Discovery of Scientific Names from Text Using Machine Learning Methods". BMC Bioinformatics. 13: 211. doi:10.1186/1471-2105-13-211. PMC 3542245. PMID 22913485.
