= Cornelia Clapp =

American zoologist and educator (1849–1934)

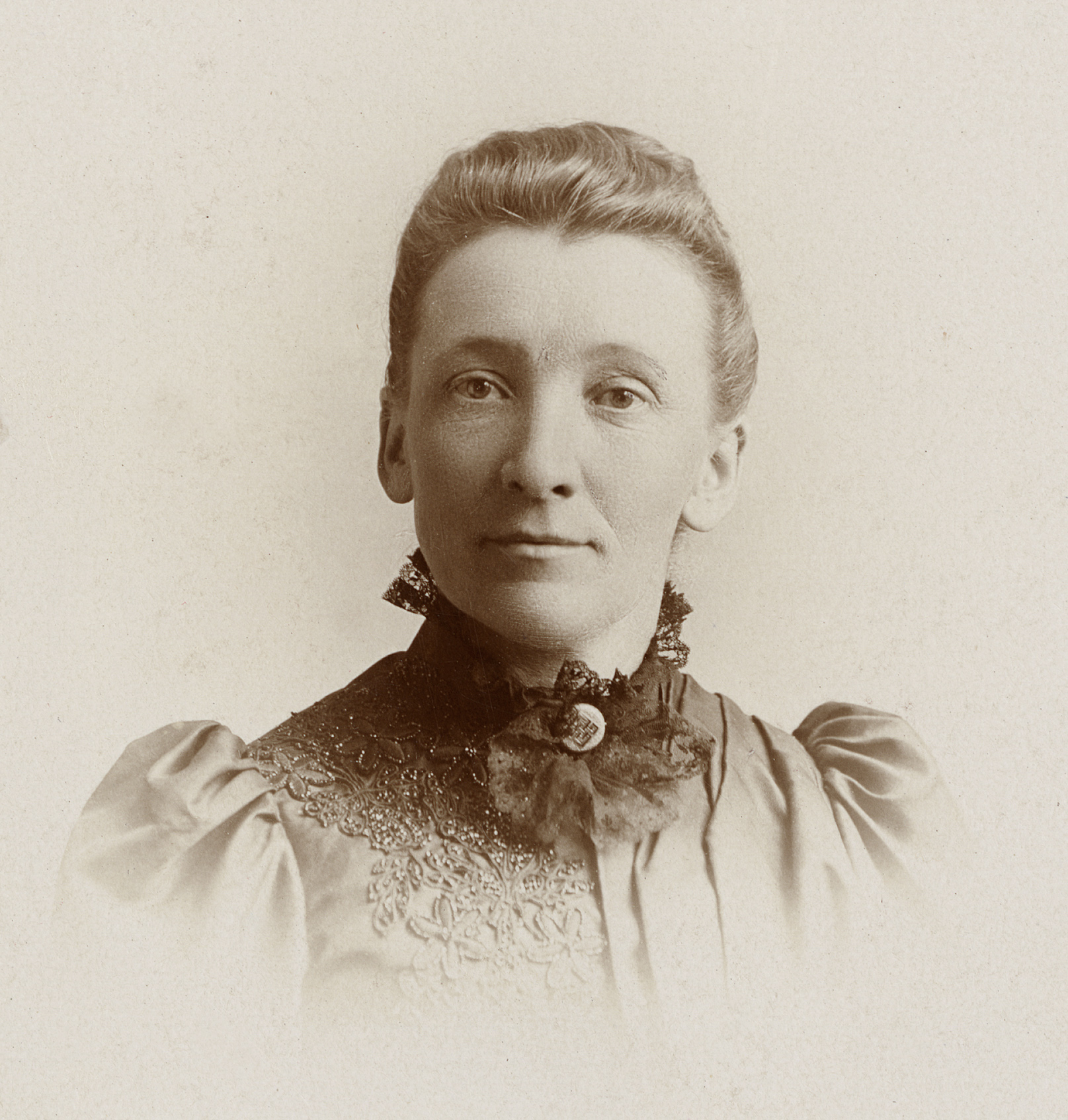
- Portrait of Clapp in 1894 (C. W. Hearn, Boston)
- Born: Cornelia Maria Clapp; March 17, 1849; Montague, Massachusetts
- Died: December 31, 1934 (aged 85); Mount Dora, Florida
- Education: Mount Holyoke College; Syracuse University; University of Chicago
- Scientific career
- Fields: Zoology; marine biology; embryology; ichthyology
- Workplaces: Mount Holyoke College; Marine Biological Laboratory
- Thesis: The lateral line system of Batrachus tau (1896)
- Academic advisors: Charles Otis Whitman

Cornelia Maria Clapp (March 17, 1849 – December 31, 1934) was an American educator and zoologist, specializing in marine biology. She earned the first Ph.D. in biology awarded to a woman in the United States from Syracuse University in 1889, and she would earn a second doctoral degree from the University of Chicago in 1896. Clapp was the first female researcher employed at the Marine Biological Laboratory, as well as its only female trustee during the first half of the 20th century. She was rated one of the top 150 zoologists in the United States in 1903, and her name was starred in the first five editions of American Men of Science (now American Men and Women of Science).

== Education ==
Clapp matriculated at Mount Holyoke Female Seminary (now Mount Holyoke College) in 1868 and completed the equivalent of an undergraduate program in 1871. (The school would not become a degree-granting college until 1888.) She would continue to pursue postgraduate studies while she taught at the school, beginning in 1874, when she went with colleague Lydia Shattuck to the Anderson School of Natural History on Penikese Island, an experimental residential summer school that provided women with postbaccalaureate education when it was not a formal option for them. Clapp would later call her time at Penikese "an opening of doors," where she first encountered a community of people deeply engaged with biological research and theory.

Clapp received her first Ph.D. from Syracuse University in 1889, which she earned by examination based on her first summer of work on the toadfish at the Marine Biological Laboratory rather than by taking a leave from Mount Holyoke to conduct research at Syracuse. In 1891, she published a paper entitled "Some Points in the Development of the Toadfish (Batrachus tau)" in which she described features of the embryonic development and nesting habits of the oyster toadfish now properly known as Opsanus tau. This is one of the earliest known publications on segmentation of the toadfish egg. In 1896, she received a second Ph.D. from the University of Chicago for her dissertation on The lateral line system of Batrachus tau, which was published in the Journal of Morphology in 1898. While materials from both Syracuse and the MBL claim that her doctorates were respectively the first and second Ph.D. granted to a woman in the biological sciences, this is not the case; they were, however, the only two doctorates in the same subject received by the same woman in the 19th century.

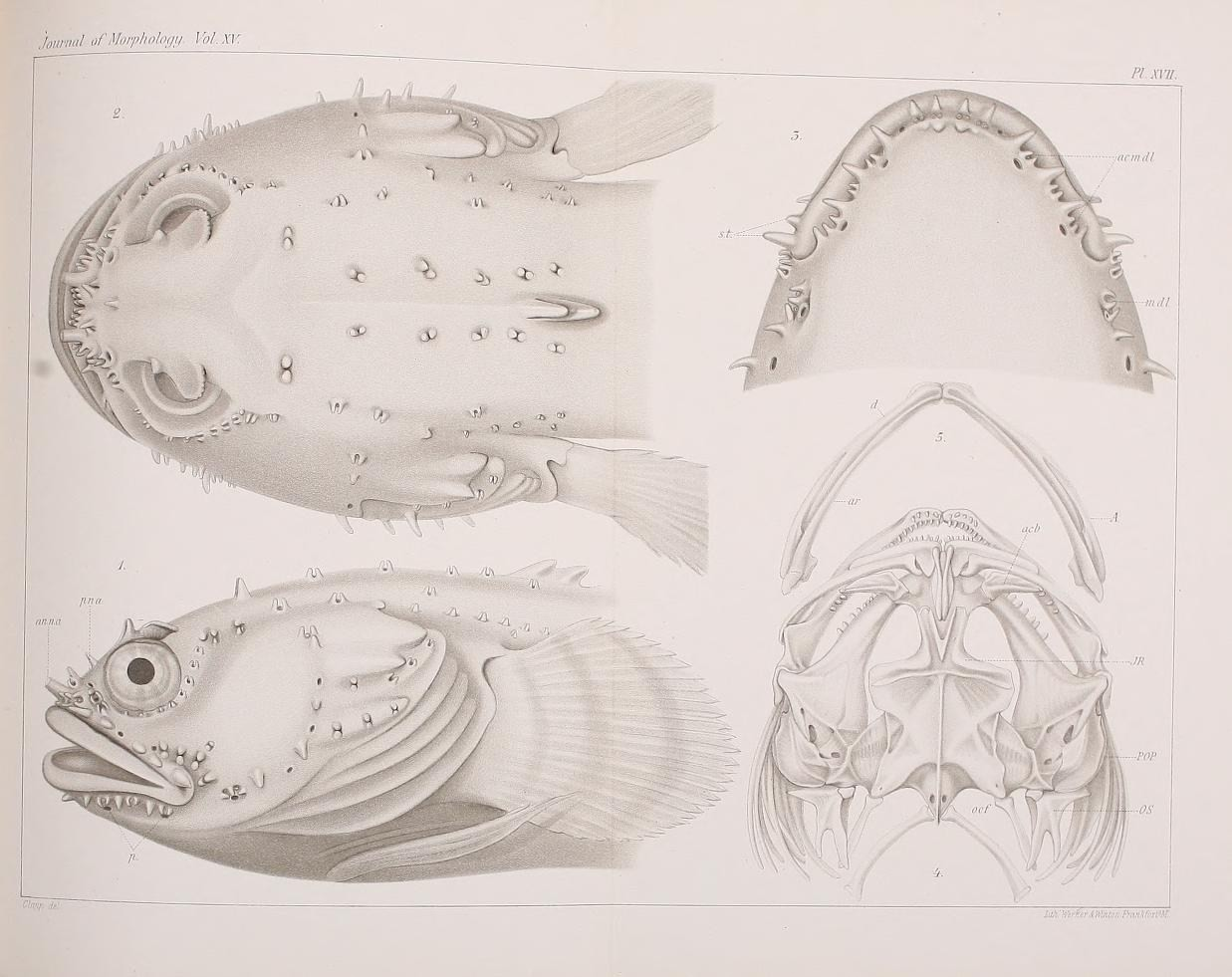
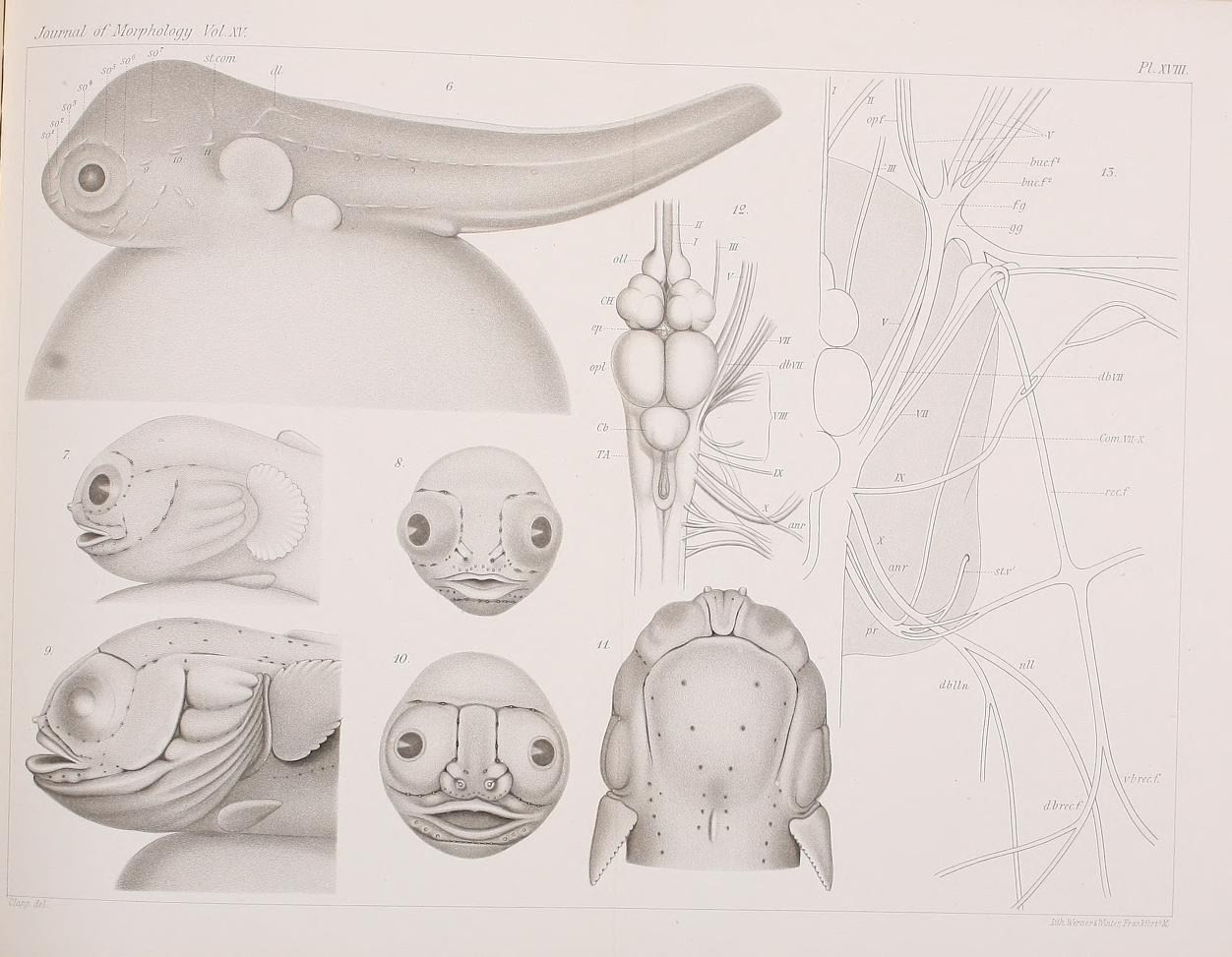
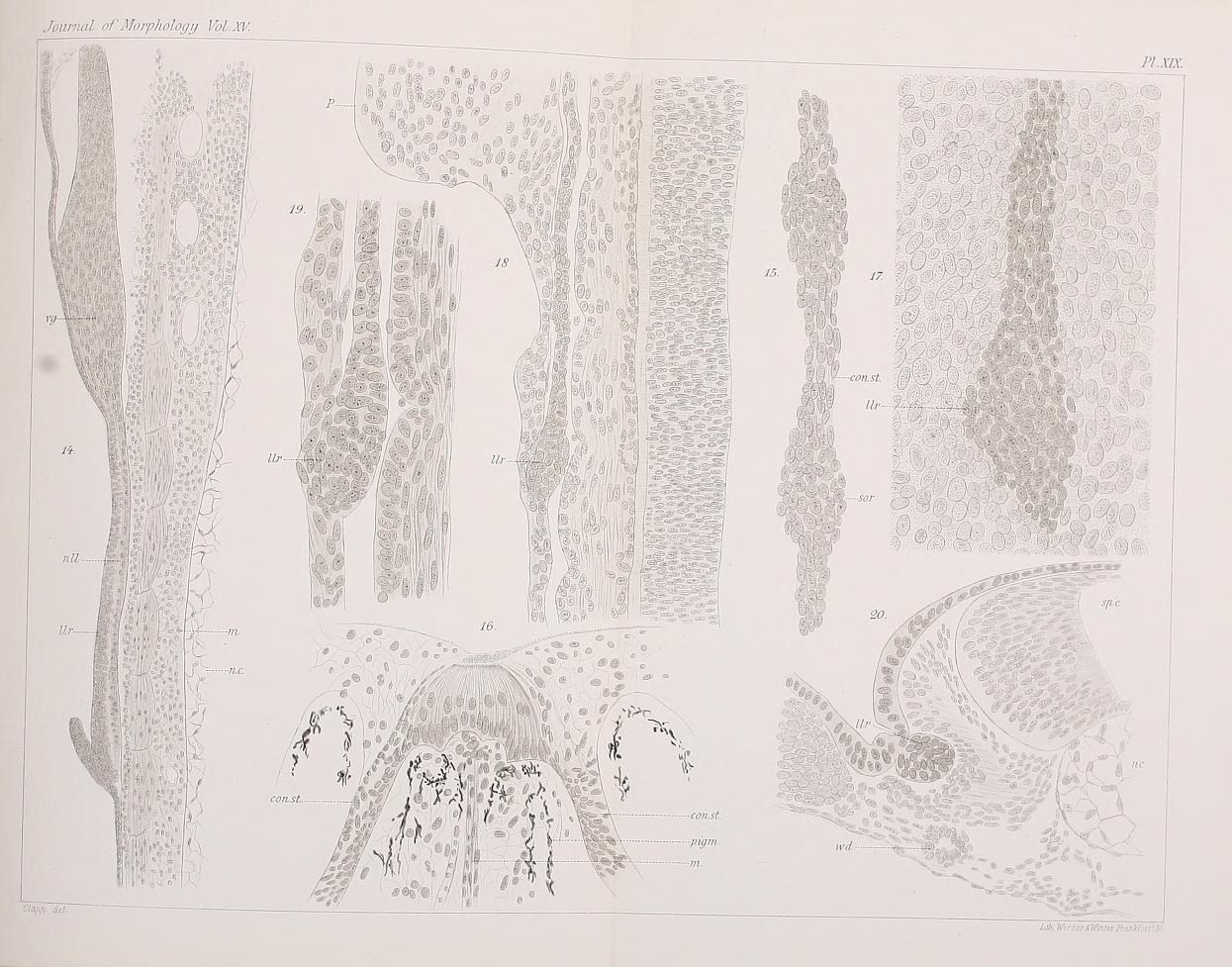
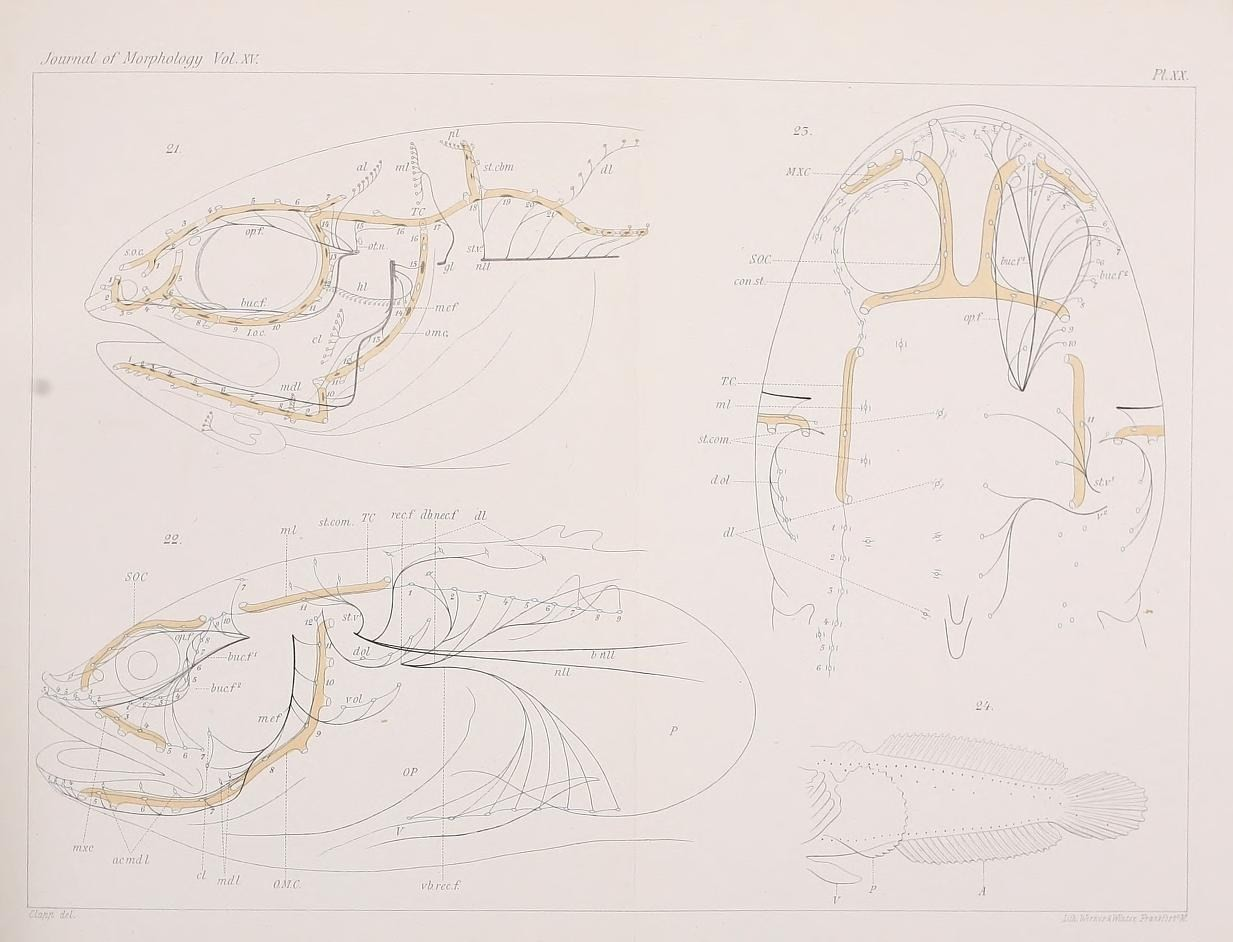
Plates from Clapp's dissertation on toadfish, as published in the Journal of Morphology

== Career ==
After graduating from Mount Holyoke, Clapp spent a year as a Latin teacher at a boys' boarding school, Potter Hall, in Andalusia, Pennsylvania. She returned to Mount Holyoke in 1872, teaching mathematics and natural history before becoming the college's gymnastics instructor from 1876 to 1891.

Clapp incorporated knowledge gained from her postgraduate studies at the Anderson School into her teaching, in particular adopting co-founder Agassiz's dictum "Study nature, not books!" For example, she introduced an embryology course, supplanted by specimens sent by alumni living abroad, to encourage study through hands-on laboratory experience instead of through books. Additionally, along with other New England entomologists, Clapp collected insects from the White Mountains of New Hampshire in the summer of 1875, as well as from various mid-Atlantic states, including the Johns Hopkins University marine station in Beaufort, South Carolina and the Smithsonian Institution in Washington, D.C., in 1877.

Clapp also completed brief studies on chick embryos and earthworms at the Massachusetts Institute of Technology and at Williams College in the early 1880s. In 1888, Clapp began her affiliation with the Marine Biological Laboratory (MBL) during its inaugural session, where she was the first researcher to be assigned a topic of investigation - the lateral line of the toadfish. While at the MBL, Clapp conducted laboratory research using specimens from the area and later became a lecturer and a trustee. In 1892, Clapp was one of the first women who joined the American Morphological Society (later the American Society of Zoologists and now the Society for Integrative and Comparative Biology).

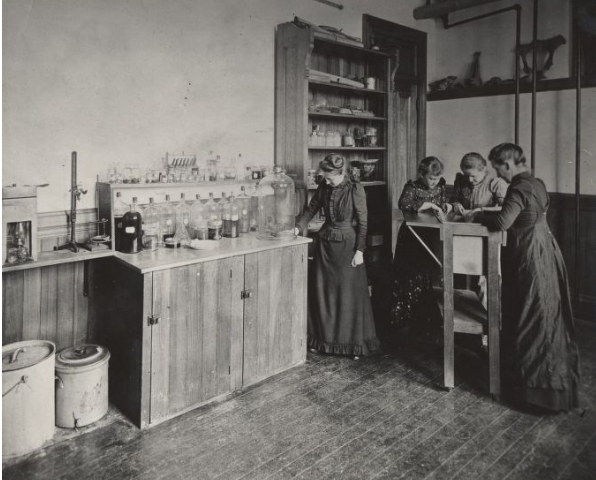
Clapp (right) with students working in a zoology laboratory at Mount Holyoke College in 1890

When she returned to Mount Holyoke after obtaining her doctoral degrees, she helped organize the department of zoology and develop its teaching facilities. Although she was primarily known as an educator and authored few scientific research papers, she was ranked one of the top 150 zoologists in the U.S. by a 1903 study reported in American Men of Science. She was named professor of zoology at her alma mater in 1904, fifteen years after her first Ph.D. in 1889.

Clapp retired from teaching in 1916, though she would continue her research at the MBL and remain involved with the Mount Holyoke community as professor emeritus.

Mount Holyoke awarded Clapp an honorary Sc.D. in 1921, and in 1923, funding for a new biology building to be named the Cornelia Clapp Laboratory in her honor was raised. The building was completed in 1924.

By 1926, she was a member of the American Association for the Advancement of Science, as her name was included in a list of special committee members that year. The rest of the committee was composed entirely of men, including ichthyologist David Starr Jordan, entomologist Leland O. Howard, and geneticist Edmund B. Wilson.

=== Marine Biological Laboratory ===
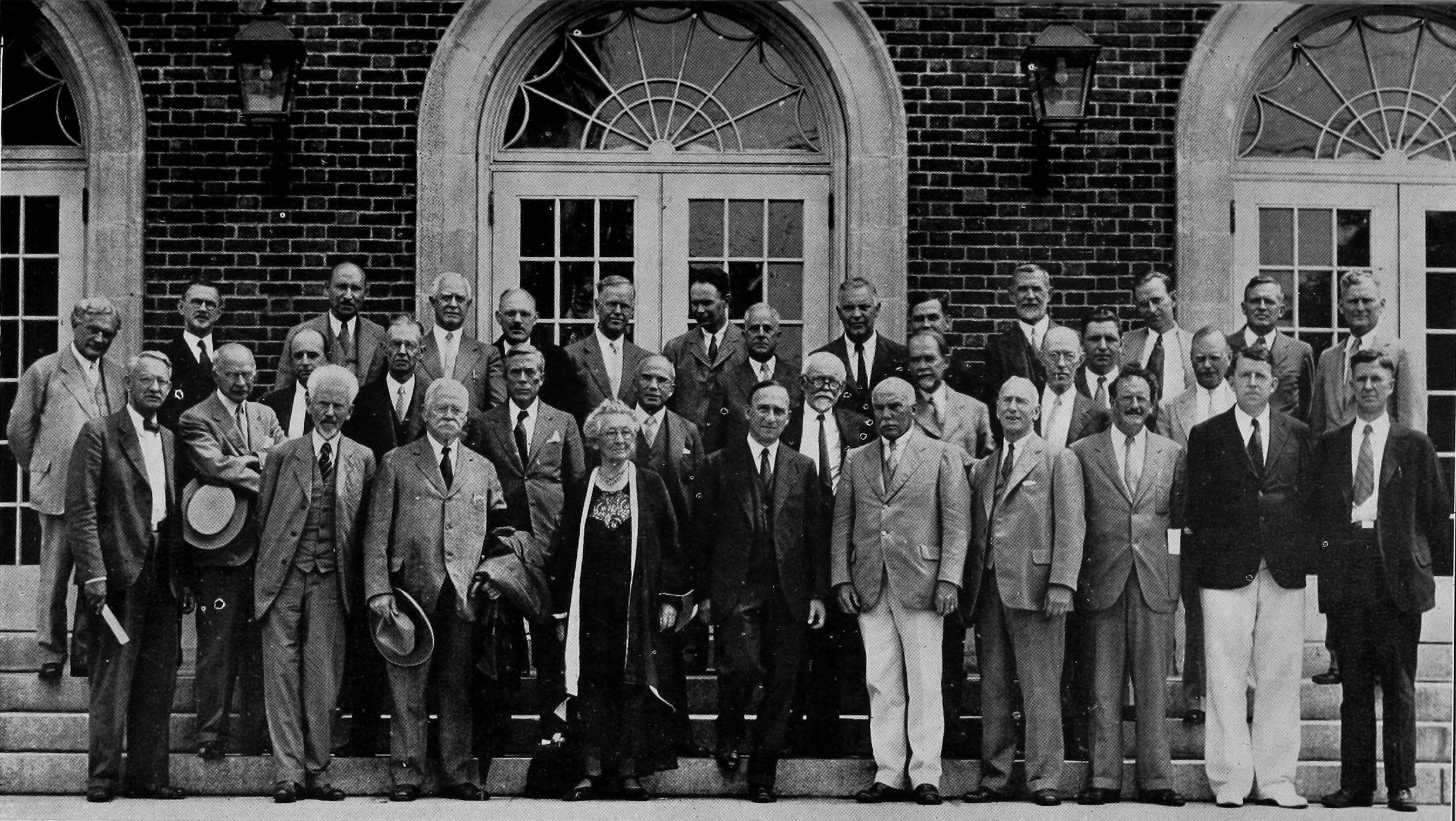
Trustees of the Marine Biological Laboratory at Woods Hole, 1934. Clapp, the only woman pictured, stands near the center of the front row.

Clapp was the first female investigator at the Marine Biological Laboratory, where she also served as librarian and trustee. Her affiliation with the institution ran from its opening in 1888 to her death in 1934. Clapp was instrumental in establishing the fledgling Marine Biological Laboratory, and she was present at the MBL's inaugural season in 1888. She was adamant about the need for a library in Woods Hole with subscriptions to the top scientific journals, and she served as the first MBL librarian. In that role, she initiated an exchange program whereby the MBL sent out its Biological Bulletin and received other international journals in return, which over time added up to a magnificent collection.

Clapp was elected to the MBL Board of Trustees in 1910. While three Boston women had been appointed trustees of the MBL upon its founding (Florence M. Cushing, Susan Minns, and Anna D. Phillips), women disappeared from the board after an 1897 shake-up, when the lab's founders ceded control of the board to a national cadre of scientists. Over the next 50 years, Clapp was one of only two women (along with Ethel Brown Harvey in the 1950s) to be elected an MBL Trustee, a position she held for the rest of her life.

In 2021, the Marine Biological Laboratory renamed their primary lecture hall the Cornelia Clapp Auditorium.

== Legacy ==
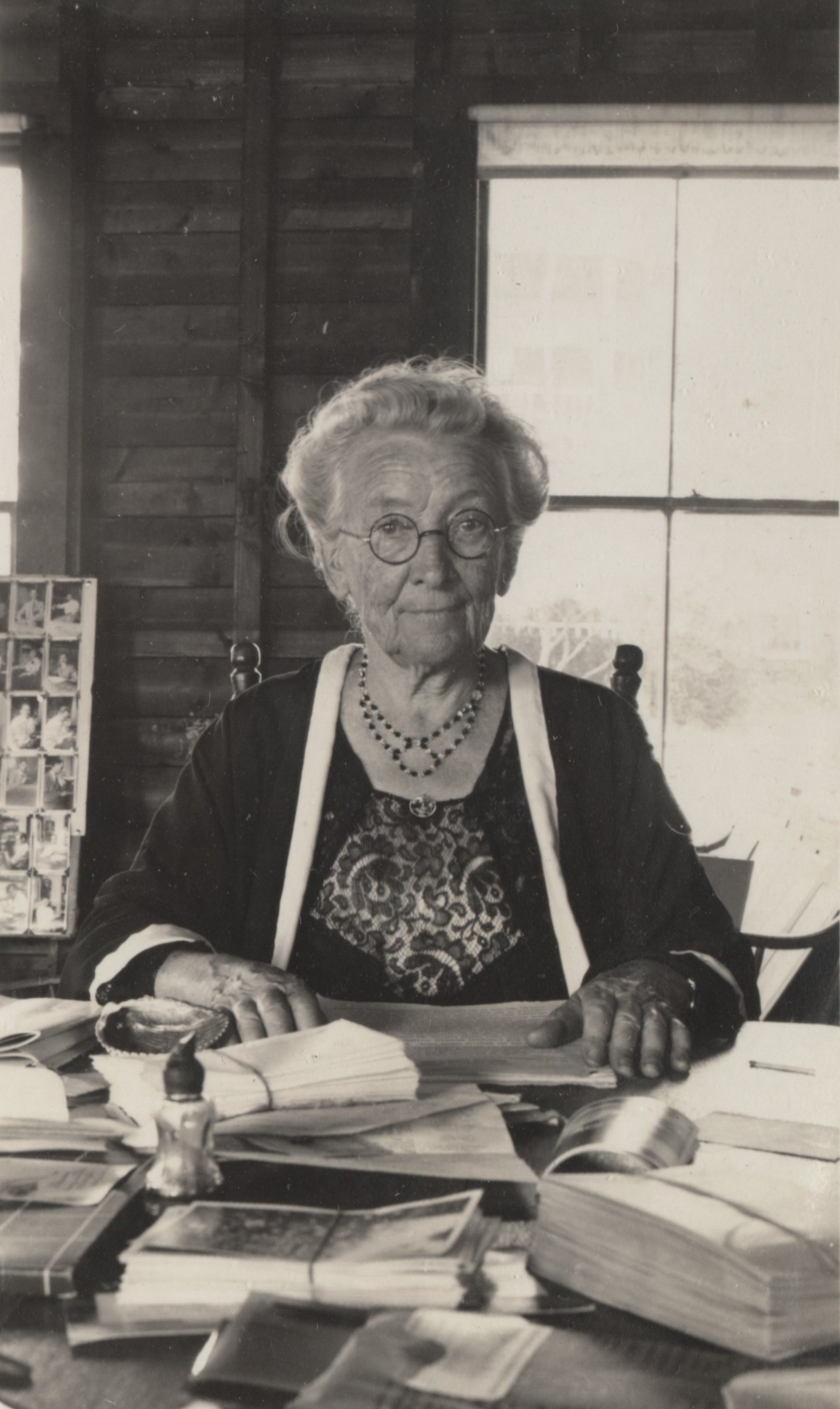
Clapp at the Marine Biological Laboratory in 1934

Clapp was a pioneering zoology researcher and leading ichthyology scholar. Her work on the toadfish was instrumental in correcting the idea that its egg was attached by a "sucker" to the yolk stalk, as she discovered that it was instead adhered with a disc of "transparent secretion" that could be separated from the membrane.

She was also an influential teacher at a time when women in the United States were increasingly given the opportunity to formally study science. She preferred fieldwork to writing publications and dedicated much of her time to extending scientific knowledge and opportunities to women through education. For example, one of her students and assistants, Louise B. Wallace, wrote an article building upon Clapp's toadfish research that was published in an 1898 issue of the Journal of Morphology. Wallace would go on to earn a Ph.D. from the University of Pennsylvania in 1908.

== Works ==
- Clapp, Cornelia M. (1891). "Some points in the development of the Toad-fish (Batrachus tau)". Journal of Morphology. 5 (3): 494–501.
- Clapp, Cornelia M. (1898). "The lateral line system of Batrachus tau". Journal of Morphology 15 (2): 223–264.
