= Lewis Thomas =

American physician, researcher, writer, and educator

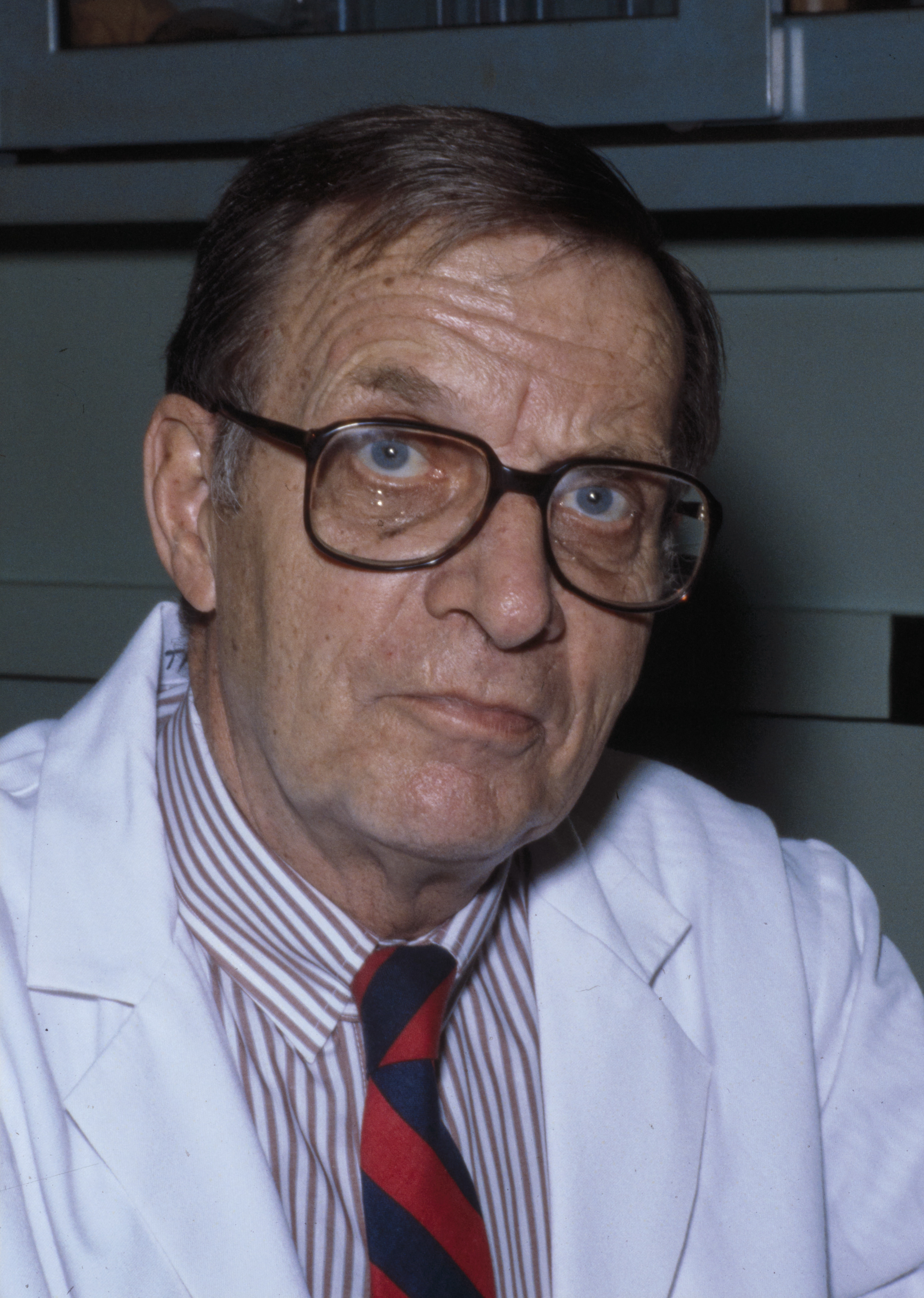
- Born: November 25, 1913; Flushing, New York, US
- Died: December 3, 1993 (aged 80); Manhattan, New York, US
- Education: Princeton University, Harvard Medical School
- Awards: National Book Award (3)
- Scientific career
- Fields: Biology, science writer, academic administration
- Workplaces: Tulane University School of Medicine

Lewis Thomas (November 25, 1913 – December 3, 1993) was an American physician, poet, etymologist, essayist, administrator, educator, policy advisor, and biologist. He was a longtime contributor to The New England Journal of Medicine, and his essays were collected in several books. He received National Book Award in Arts and Letters and The Sciences for The Lives of a Cell.

== Life and career ==
Thomas was born in Flushing, New York and attended Princeton University and Harvard Medical School. He became Dean of Yale Medical School and New York University School of Medicine, and President of Memorial Sloan-Kettering Institute. His formative years as an independent medical researcher were at Tulane University School of Medicine. He was a longtime contributor to The New England Journal of Medicine. He received National Book Awards in Arts and Letters and The Sciences for The Lives of a Cell.

He was invited to write regular essays in the New England Journal of Medicine. One collection of those essays, The Lives of a Cell: Notes of a Biology Watcher (1974), won annual National Book Awards in two categories, Arts and Letters and The Sciences (both awards were split). (He also won a Christopher Award for that book.) Two other collections of essays (originally published in NEJM and elsewhere) were The Medusa and the Snail and Late Night Thoughts on Listening to Mahler's Ninth Symphony. In its first paperback edition, The Medusa and the Snail won another National Book Award in Science. (Note: This was the 1981 award for paperback Science. From 1980 to 1983 in National Book Awards history there were dual hardcover and paperback awards in most categories, and multiple nonfiction subcategories. Most of the paperback award-winners were reprints, including this one.)

His autobiography, The Youngest Science: Notes of a Medicine Watcher, is a record of a century of medicine and the changes which occurred in it. He also published a book on etymology, Et Cetera, Et Cetera, poems, and numerous scientific papers.

Many of his essays discuss relationships among ideas or concepts using etymology as a starting point. Others concern the cultural implications of scientific discoveries and the growing awareness of ecology. In his essay on Mahler's Ninth Symphony, Thomas addresses the anxieties produced by the development of nuclear weapons. Thomas is often quoted, given his notably eclectic interests and superlative prose style.

Thomas was a member of the American Academy of Arts and Sciences (1961), the United States National Academy of Sciences (1972), and the American Philosophical Society (1976). Thomas was awarded an honorary degree from Reed College in 1977. The Lewis Thomas Prize is awarded annually by The Rockefeller University to a scientist for artistic achievement. He died in 1993 of Waldenstrom's disease, a rare lymphoma-like cancer.

Thomas received honorary degrees from Yale University (1969); the University of Rochester (1974); Princeton University and Johns Hopkins University (both 1976); Duke University, the Medical College of Ohio, and Reed College (1977); Columbia University, Memorial University of Newfoundland, and the University of North Carolina (1978); the Worcester Foundation for Experimental Biology (1979); Dickinson College and Trinity College (1980); Ursinus College (1981); Williams College and the New England Conservatory of Music (1982); and the State University of New York at Stony Brook, New York University School of Medicine, Connecticut College, and the University of Wales (1983).

His daughter is writer Abigail Thomas.

Regarding interstellar communication he said “I would vote for Bach, all of Bach, streamed out into space, over and over again. We would be bragging of course but it is surely excusable to put the best possible face on at the beginning of such an acquaintance. We can tell the harder truths later.”

== Books ==
- The Lives of a Cell: Notes of a Biology Watcher, 1974, Viking Press: ISBN 0-670-43442-6, Penguin Books, 1995 reprint: ISBN 0-14-004743-3
- A Long Line of Cells. Collected Essays, 1990, Viking Penguin. ASIN B000UWN4OM
- The Medusa and the Snail: More Notes of a Biology Watcher, 1979, Viking Press: ISBN 0-670-46568-2, Penguin Books, 1995 reprint: ISBN 0-14-024319-4
- Late Night Thoughts on Listening to Mahler's Ninth Symphony, 1983, Viking Press: ISBN 0-670-70390-7, Penguin Books, 1995 reprint: ISBN 0-14-024328-3
- The Youngest Science: Notes of a Medicine-Watcher, 1983, Viking: ISBN 0-670-79533-X, Penguin Books, 1995 reprint: ISBN 0-14-024327-5
- Et Cetera, Et Cetera: Notes of a Word-Watcher, 1990. Little Brown & Co ISBN 0-316-84099-8, Welcome Rain, 2000 ISBN 1-56649-166-5
- The Fragile Species, 1992, Scribner, ISBN 0-684-19420-1, Simon & Schuster, 1996 paperback: ISBN 0-684-84302-1
