= Nina Bourne =

Publishing executive

- Born: June 16, 1916; Warsaw, Poland
- Died: April 9, 2010 (aged 93); Manhattan, New York City, New York
- Education: Radcliffe College (BA, 1937)
- Occupation: Publishing executive
- Employer(s): Simon & Schuster, Alfred A. Knopf

Nina Bourne (1916–2010) was a publishing executive for more than 70 years for both Simon & Schuster and Alfred A. Knopf. She was known for her marketing and advertising campaigns for many books including Catch-22 and the Eloise series of children's books.

== Early and personal life ==
Nina Bourne was born on June 16, 1916, in Warsaw and arrived in New York when she was five years old. Bourne attended the Fieldston School and Radcliffe College, where she graduated with a bachelor's degree in 1937.

Bourne did not marry but "adopted" many of her friend's children as her own.

== Career ==
Bourne began her career in 1939 at Simon & Schuster by writing an application letter in the form of a poem that incorporated the names of the publisher's top authors and bestselling book titles. Her first position was secretary to co-founder Richard Simon. Working with Jack Goodman, she developed a flair for writing advertising copy.

Bourne described her early days at Simon & Schuster as magic, "I was so taken with the snazzy ads written by Dick Simon. We called him 'Boss,' because he didn't have to please anybody. He just wrote. And his ads were complete and straightforward and conversational and factual, and terrific."

After Goodman's death in 1957 Bourne took over writing The Inner Sanctum, a news-like advertorial that appeared in both the New York Times Book Review and Publishers Weekly. The Inner Sanctum was also the name of a Simon & Schuster mystery line and Max Schuster and Dick Simon were the original authors for the column.

Bourne created ad campaigns for many blockbuster titles including Catch-22, Eloise, and The Rise and Fall of the Third Reich. Bourne's campaign for Catch-22, beginning in 1961, is considered a classic for both advertising and publishing students. A personal champion for the book, Bourne placed large advertisements that reported on its progress in the marketplace with a listing of prominent authors who praised the book and also quoting reviews from ordinary readers. This campaign continued for over a year reporting with progress reports to the past and future readers. The hardcover only sold 35,000 copies in its first print run, but its sales increased when published in paperback by Dell Publishing. The paperback sold almost a million copies by 1962. Of Catch-22, Bourne said to Robert Gottlieb, "I'm like the demented governess who thinks the baby is her own."

Bourne created the advertising campaign for Kay Thompson's Eloise books with the tag line, "A book for precocious grown-ups."

Bourne also came up with the title for the book, The Rise and Fall of the Third Reich. The author, William Shirer, was working on the book with editor Joe Barnes with the tentative title of Hitler's Nightmare Empire. No one liked the title, and it was Bourne, who after looking at the cover, suggested they use the sub-title as the full title.

In 1966, Bourne was appointed the vice-president of advertising for Simon & Schuster.

In 1968, Gottlieb, Bourne, and Schulte moved to Alfred A. Knopf after Bob Bernstein the CEO of Random House said to them, "Other people can offer you a job. I can offer you a publishing house. If you come, the three of you can run Knopf." Bourne remained vice-president until 2009. Of her long-term stay, Bourne said to Jane Friedman, "The most amazing thing happened to me, Jane. One day I went downstairs for a pack of cigarettes at Simon & Schuster, and by the time I got upstairs twenty-nine years had gone by." At Knopf, Bourne developed their brand featuring large, clean, heavily bordered ads in black and white with minimal copy.

Upon meeting Bourne in 2005, Al Silverman described her, "Nina came out of the elevator with a little smile on her face. It had to be her. Looking closer, I saw that her face was absolutely untouched by age. She had a small hat over small bangs, giving her that Anita Loos look. But she was prettier than Loos. Eighty-nine years old she was still working for Knopf four days a week, doing the same work she had done for Simon & Schuster way back when--reading manuscripts, writing flap copy, helping with the ads, originating book titles, fighting for the books she thought must be acquired."

Alice Quinn, a former senior editor for Knopf and also the poetry editor at the New Yorker described Bourne as a "great, great mentor to me and many other people."

Aside from her career in publishing, Bourne occasionally published light verse in the New Yorker.
