= The Rise and Fall of the Third Reich =

1960 history book by William L. Shirer

The Rise and Fall of the Third Reich: A History of Nazi Germany
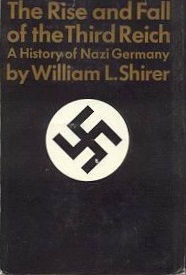
- Cover of the first edition
- Author: William L. Shirer
- Language: English
- Subject: Nazi Germany
- Publisher: Simon & Schuster
- Publication date: October 17, 1960
- Publication place: United States
- Media type: Print (hardcover and paperback)
- Pages: 1,249
- Awards: National Book Award for Non-Fiction
- ISBN: 9780671728694 1990 edition
- Dewey Decimal: 943.086
- LC Class: DD256.5 .S48

The Rise and Fall of the Third Reich: A History of Nazi Germany is a book by American journalist William L. Shirer in which the author chronicles the rise and fall of Nazi Germany from the birth of Adolf Hitler in 1889 to the end of World War II in Europe in 1945. It was first published in 1960 by Simon & Schuster in the United States. It was a bestseller in both the United States and Europe, and a critical success outside Germany; in Germany, criticism of the book stimulated sales. The book was feted by journalists, as reflected by its receipt of the National Book Award for non-fiction, but the reception from academic historians was mixed.

The book is based upon captured Nazi documents, the available diaries of propaganda minister Joseph Goebbels, of General Franz Halder, and of the Italian Foreign Minister Galeazzo Ciano, evidence and testimony from the Nuremberg trials, British Foreign Office reports, and the author's recollection of his six years in Germany (from 1934 to 1940) as a journalist, reporting on Nazi Germany for newspapers, the United Press International (UPI), and CBS Radio.

== Content and themes ==
The Rise and Fall of the Third Reich is Shirer's comprehensive historical interpretation of the Nazi era, positing that German history logically proceeded from Martin Luther to Adolf Hitler; (Note: "The notion that 'rectitude and authenticity [were] integrally German attributes, in contrast to Roman or Latin influences which were degrading' held to have originated with Luther, developed with German Romanticism in the 19th Century, and culminated with National Socialism." Johnson 2001.) and that Hitler's accession to power was an expression of German national character, not of totalitarianism as an ideology that was internationally fashionable in the 1930s. The author summarised his perspective: "[T]he course of German history ... made blind obedience to temporal rulers the highest virtue of Germanic man, and put a premium on servility." This Sonderweg (special path or unique course) interpretation of German history was then common in American scholarship. Yet, despite extensive references, some academic critics consider its interpretation of Nazism to be flawed. The book also includes (identified) speculation, such as the theory that Gestapo Chief Heinrich Müller afterward joined the NKVD of the USSR.

== Development history ==
The editor for the book was Joseph Barnes, a foreign editor of the New York Herald Tribune, a former editor of PM, another New York newspaper, and a former speechwriter for Wendell Willkie. Barnes was an old friend of Shirer. The manuscript was very late and Simon & Schuster threatened to cancel the contract several times; each time Barnes would win a reprieve for Shirer. The book took more than five years to write, and Shirer ran out of money long before it was completed. Frank Altschul's family project, the Overbrook Foundation, came to the rescue in the summer of 1958, when Shirer was "flat broke" and desperate. At the recommendation of Hamilton Fish Armstrong the Overbrook Foundation advanced immediately to Shirer $5,000 ($52,500 in 2024 dollars) and promised another $5,000 six months later, enabling Shirer to finish his monumental book. In the third volume of his autobiography, Shirer wrote: "This saved my life and my book . . . and I settled back to fourteen hours a day of writing."

The original title of the book was Hitler's Nightmare Empire with The Rise and Fall of the Third Reich as the sub-title. The title and cover had already been sent out in catalogs when Robert Gottlieb decided that both title and cover had to be changed. He also chose to publish the book as a single volume rather than two as originally planned. Nina Bourne decided that they should use the sub-title as the title and art director Frank Metz designed the black jacket bearing the swastika. Initially bookstores across the country protested displaying the swastika and threatened not to stock the book. The controversy soon blew over and the cover shipped with the symbol.

== Success and acclaim ==
In the U.S., where it was published on October 17, 1960, The Rise and Fall of the Third Reich sold more than one million hardcover copies, two-thirds via the Book of the Month Club, and more than one million paperback copies. In 1961, Simon & Schuster sold the paperback rights to Fawcett Publications for $400,000 (equivalent to $4.31 million in 2025). It won the 1961 National Book Award for Nonfiction and the Carey–Thomas Award for non-fiction. In 1962, the Reader's Digest magazine serialization reached some 12 million additional readers. In a New York Times Book Review, Hugh Trevor-Roper praised it as "a splendid work of scholarship, objective in method, sound in judgment, inescapable in its conclusions." The book sold well in Britain, France, Italy, and in West Germany, because of its international recognition, bolstered by German editorial attacks.

Both its recognition by journalists as a great history book and its popular success surprised Shirer, as the publisher had commissioned a first printing of merely 12,500 copies. More than fifteen years after the end of the Second World War, neither Shirer nor the publisher had anticipated much popular interest in Adolf Hitler or in Nazi Germany.

== Criticism ==
Nearly all journalists praised the book. Many scholars acknowledged Shirer's achievement but some condemned it. The harshest criticism came from those who disagreed with the Sonderweg or "Luther to Hitler" thesis. In West Germany, the Sonderweg interpretation was almost universally rejected in favor of the view that Nazism was simply one instance of totalitarianism that arose in various countries. Gavriel Rosenfeld asserted in 1994 that Rise and Fall was unanimously condemned by German historians in the 1960s, and considered dangerous to relations between the United States and West Germany, as it might inflame anti-German sentiments in the United States.

Klaus Epstein listed what he contended were "four major failings": a crude understanding of German history; a lack of balance, leaving important gaps; no understanding of a modern totalitarian regime; and ignorance of current scholarship of the Nazi period.

Elizabeth Wiskemann concluded in a review that the book was "not sufficiently scholarly nor sufficiently well written to satisfy more academic demands. ... It is too long and cumbersome. ... Mr Shirer, has, however compiled a manual ... which will certainly prove useful."

Nearly 36 years after the book's publication, LGBT activist Peter Tatchell criticized the book's treatment of the persecution of homosexuals in Nazi Germany. In the philosopher Jon Stewart's anthology The Hegel Myths and Legends (1996), The Rise and Fall of the Third Reich is listed as a work that has propagated "myths" about the philosopher Georg Wilhelm Friedrich Hegel.

In 2004, the historian Richard J. Evans, author of The Third Reich Trilogy (2003–2008), said that Rise and Fall is a "readable general history of Nazi Germany" and that "there are good reasons for [its] success." However, he contended that Shirer worked outside the academic mainstream and that Shirer's account was not informed by the historical scholarship of the time.

== Adaptation and publication ==
The Rise and Fall of the Third Reich
- Directed by: Jack Kaufman
- Narrated by: Richard Basehart
- Theme music composer: Lalo Schifrin
- No. of episodes: 3

Production
- Executive producer: Mel Stuart
- Editors: William T. Cartwright, Nicholas Clapp, and John Soh
- Production companies: David L. Wolper Productions; MGM Television

Original release
- Network: ABC
- Release: 1968

A television adaptation was broadcast in the United States on the ABC television network in 1968, consisting of a one-hour episode aired each night over three nights.

The book has been reprinted many times since it was published in 1960. The 1990 edition contained an afterword whereby Shirer gave a brief discourse on how his book was received when it was initially published and the future for Germany during German reunification in the atomic age. The 2011 edition contains a new introduction by Ron Rosenbaum. Current in-print editions are:

- ISBN 84-7069-368-9 (Grupo Océano, 1987 SP, hardcover)
- ISBN 0-671-72868-7 (Simon & Schuster, US, 1990 paperback)
- ISBN 0-09-942176-3 (Arrow Books, UK, 1990 paperback)
- Folio Society edition (2004 hardcover)
- ISBN 978-1-4516-4259-9 (Simon & Schuster, US, 2011 hardcover)
- ISBN 978-1-4516-5168-3 (Simon & Schuster, US, 2011 paperback)

There is also an audiobook version, released in 2010 by Blackstone Audio and read by Grover Gardner.

== Similar or related works ==
- The Second World War by Antony Beevor (2012).
- Inferno: The World at War, 1939-1945 by Max Hastings (2011).
- The Storm of War by Andrew Roberts (2009).

== See also ==
- Berlin Diary
- List of books by or about Adolf Hitler
- The Collapse of the Third Republic, also by Shirer
