= The Sinking of the Bismarck =

1962 book by William L. Shirer

The Sinking of the Bismarck: The Deadly Hunt
- Author: William L. Shirer
- Language: English
- Genre: History, nonfiction
- Published: 1962
- Publisher: Sterling Point
- Publication place: United States
- Pages: 176
- ISBN: 9781402736162

The Sinking of the Bismarck: The Deadly Hunt is a 1962 historical nonfiction book by William L. Shirer. It tells the story of the Royal Navy's hunt to destroy the German battleship Bismarck, culminating in the final battle where the ship is sunk by gunfire and torpedoes.
