= Lizzie Gottlieb =

American documentarian

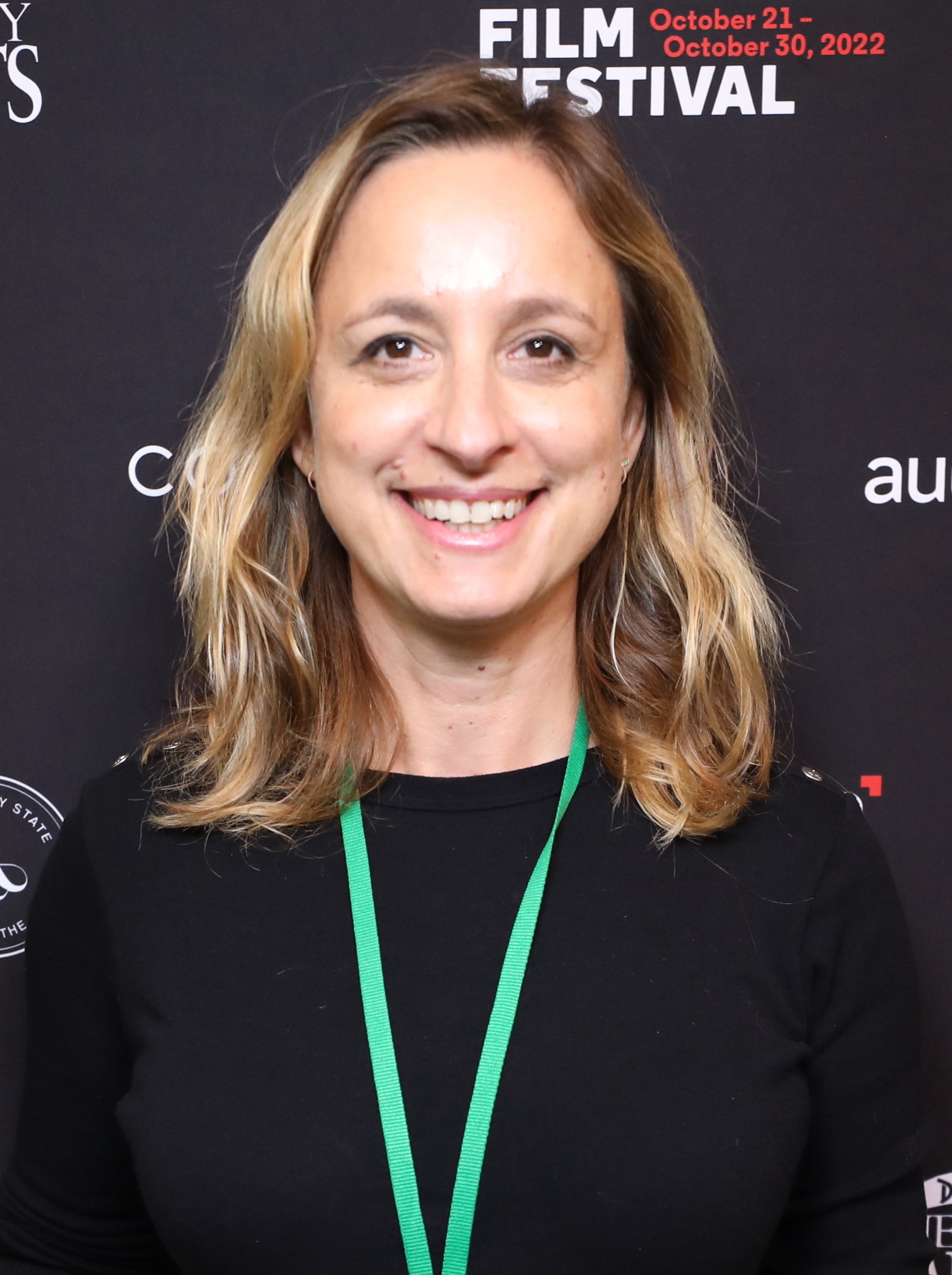
- Gottlieb at the 2022 Montclair Film Festival
- Born: January 5, 1971 (age 55)
- Occupation: Documentary Filmmaker
- Known for: Turn Every Page, Today’s Man, Romeo Romeo

Elizabeth Alice Gottlieb (born January 5, 1971) is an American film and theater director best known for her documentaries Today's Man (2006), Romeo Romeo (2012), and Turn Every Page (2022).

== Early life and education ==
Elizabeth Alice Gottlieb, known as "Lizzie," was born to the editor Robert Gottlieb and the actress Maria Tucci in 1971. She graduated from Amherst College magna cum laude. Gottlieb married Michael Young, the President of the New York Film Academy, in 2000.

== Career ==
Lizzie Gottlieb began her career directing theater in New York. She founded and ran an Off-Broadway theater company dedicated to producing new plays at accessible prices on Theater Row. With that company, Pure Orange Productions, she produced and directed plays including Keith Bunin’s The Principality of Sorrows with Robert Sean Leonard, David Lansbury, and Joanna Going; Marking by Patrick Breen, starring Peter Dinklage, Amy Ryan, Aidina Porter, and Maria Tucci. Other productions included Jonathan Marc Sherman's Evolution with Josh Hamilton and Peter Dinklage, Noel Coward's Private Lives with Sara Ramirez, and Fifth Planet by David Auburn with Christina Kirk and Michael Ian Black. Gottlieb directed plays for Naked Angels, New York Stage and Film, malaparte, and Juilliard. In May 2024 she directed Amy Herzog's 4,000 Miles, starring Maria Tucci (Gottlieb's mother) and Evan Silverstein.

Gottlieb's first feature documentary, Today's Man, follows her brother Nicky, who is on the Autism Spectrum. The film follows him as Nicky tries to leave the safety of his childhood home and find his place in the world. Gottlieb documents the trials, fears, joys and triumphs of this journey. The film aired on PBS (Independent Lens) in January 2008, after six years of filming and played at festivals and conferences around the world.

Her film Romeo Romeo follows a young lesbian couple as they try to have a baby. It's a story of a marriage, a heartbreak, and a commitment to a dream, with a surprise ending. It also aired on PBS (America Reframed) and it won the 2017 NLGJA award for Excellence in Documentary.

Her most recent film, Turn Every Page, is a documentary about her father, the editor Robert Gottlieb, and the author Robert Caro, which follows the two men as they methodically work to complete the final, fifth volume of Caro's Lyndon Johnson biography. The film premiered in June 2022 at the Tribeca Film Festival. Caro, 86, and Bob Gottlieb, 91, have worked together for five decades, starting with Caro's biography of Robert Moses, The Power Broker, and continuing through Caro's first four volumes about Lyndon B. Johnson. Though they originally declined to be the subject of the documentary, after some convincing, Lizzie Gottlieb began filming them in 2016. The story focuses on the process of editing and the interplay between editor and writer rather than a history of their lives. The film was purchased by Sony Pictures Classics and was to have a theatrical release starting on December 30, 2022.

Currently, Gottlieb is teaching documentary filmmaking at the New York Film Academy. She is a Senior Fellow at Brown University's Watson Institute where Shen teaches Documentary Directing.
