= Niccolò Tucci =

Niccolò Tucci (1 May 1908 – 10 December 1999) was a short story writer and novelist who wrote in English and Italian.

== Early life and family ==
Tucci was born in Lugano, Switzerland, on 1 May 1908, to a Russian mother and an Italian father who became a Swiss citizen. Niccolò Tucci grew up in privileged circumstances that were eliminated by the Bolshevik Revolution. His family relocated to Tuscany.

His daughter, Maria Tucci, is an actress who married her father's former editor, Robert Gottlieb.

== Career ==
In 1938, he resigned a position with Mussolini's Press Ministry and immigrated to the United States. He wrote numerous short stories and a few longer works, many of which are largely autobiographical in their subject matter.

== Death ==
Tucci died on 10 December 1999.

== Works ==
=== Books ===
- Il Segreto (1956)
- Before My Time (1962)
- Unfinished Funeral (1964)
- Gli Atlantici (1968)
- Confessioni Involontarie (1975)
- The Sun and the Moon (1977)
- The Rain Came Last and Other Stories (1990)

=== Stories ===
| Title | Publication | Collected in |
|---|---|---|
| "Where Anarchy Begins" | Partisan Review 11.2 (Spring 1944) | - |
| "The Siege" | Harper's (February 1946) | The Rain Came Last and Other Stories |
| "The Schemers" | Harper's (August 1946) | The Rain Came Last and Other Stories |
| "Hey!" | Twice a Year (Fall 1946-Winter 1947) | The Rain Came Last and Other Stories |
| "The Evolution of Knowledge" | The New Yorker (12 April 1947) | The Rain Came Last and Other Stories |
| "Strong Man" | The New Yorker (17 May 1947) | - |
| "The Truce" | The New Yorker (5 July 1947) | - |
| "The Rain Came Last" | Harper's (January 1948) | The Rain Came Last and Other Stories |
| "The News" aka "The Assignment" | The New Yorker (10 April 1948) | The Rain Came Last and Other Stories |
| "Military Intelligence" | The New Yorker (29 May 1948) | The Rain Came Last and Other Stories |
| "The Prisoner" | The New Yorker (23 October 1948) | - |
| "Tronco" | Harper's (November 1949) | - |
| "History Comes C.O.D." | The New Yorker (14 January 1950) | The Rain Came Last and Other Stories |
| "Brother Lenin" | The New Yorker (1 April 1950) | - |
| "The Underground Settlers" | The New Yorker (4 August 1951) | The Rain Came Last and Other Stories |
| "Those Long Shadows" | Botteghe Oscure 8 (1951) | The Rain Came Last and Other Stories |
| "The Lonely Song" | New Directions in Prose & Poetry 13 (1951) | - |
| "Stolen Dream" | The New Yorker (19 January 1952) | - |
| "The Queen and I" | The New Yorker (3 May 1952) | - |
| "The Death of the Maid" | Harper's (October 1952) | - |
| "Morte di scarandogi" | Botteghe Oscure 12 (1953) | Il segreto |
| "Last Stand" | The New Yorker (17 April 1954) | - |
| "Ombre lunghe" | L'Illustrazione Italiana (November 1954) | Il segreto |
| "Il segreto" | Botteghe Oscure 15 (1955) | Il segreto |
| "Special Ambassador" | Mademoiselle (April 1956) | - |
| "The Dollmaker" | The Atlantic (September 1956) | - |
| "I tempi buoni" | Il segreto (1956) | Il segreto |
| "Della palla del mondo" | Il segreto (1956) | Il segreto |
| "La gran festa dell’oggi" | Il segreto (1956) | Il segreto |
| "I segreti della mamma" | Il segreto (1956) | Il segreto |
| "Figli e padri" | Il segreto (1956) | Il segreto |
| "Il sogno rubato" | Il segreto (1956) | Il segreto |
| "Le parole" | Il segreto (1956) | Il segreto |
| "The Beautiful Blue Horse" | The New Yorker (13 April 1957) | The Rain Came Last and Other Stories |
| "Terror and Grief" | The New Yorker (15 November 1958) | The Rain Came Last and Other Stories |
| "This Particular Rich Lady" | Botteghe Oscure 24 (1959) | The Rain Came Last and Other Stories |
| "Death of the Professor" | The New Yorker (27 February 1960) | The Rain Came Last and Other Stories |
| "The Trigger" | The New Yorker (10 June 1961) | - |
| "Four Dialogues" | The New Yorker (18 August 1962) | - |
| "The Desert in the Oasis" | The New Yorker (6 October 1962) | - |
| "The Announcement" | The New Yorker (29 December 1962) | - |
| "The Worst" | Esquire (August 1965) | - |
| "But Where Is the Month of December?" | Ploughshares 6.3 (Fall 1980) | - |
| "The French Revolution" | The Paris Review 111 (Summer 1989) | - |
