= Berlin Diary =

Book by William L. Shirer

- Cover of the first edition
- Author: William Shirer
- Language: English
- Publisher: Alfred A. Knopf
- Publication date: June 20, 1941
- Publication place: United States
- Media type: Print
- Pages: 600
- ISBN: 9784871878814
- Dewey Decimal: 943.086092
- LC Class: D727 .S529
- Followed by: End of a Berlin Diary

Berlin Diary ("The Journal of a Foreign Correspondent 1934–1941") is a first-hand account of the rise of Nazi Germany and its road to war, as witnessed by the American journalist William L. Shirer. Shirer covered Germany for several years as a radio reporter for CBS. Feeling increasingly uncomfortable as the Nazi press censors made it impossible for him to report objectively to his listeners in the United States, Shirer eventually left the country. The identities of many of Shirer's German sources were disguised to protect these people from retaliation by the German secret police, the Gestapo. It provided much of the material for his subsequent landmark book The Rise and Fall of the Third Reich.

The book was published in New York by Alfred A. Knopf on June 20, 1941, almost six months before Germany declared war on the United States, and simultaneously in Canada by Ryerson Press, when Canada was already at war with Germany. It was "the first attempt by a big-name American journalist to shed light on what was really happening in Nazi Germany" and sold almost 600,000 copies in the first year of its publication. The book was widely praised by academics and critics at the time of its publication. A recent literary study comparing the original diary in Shirer's literary estate with the published text revealed that Shirer made substantial changes, such as revising his early favourable impressions of Hitler. Much of the text about the period before the war (1934 to 1938) was written retroactively.

In 1947, End of a Berlin Diary continued the story of the Third Reich, from July 20, 1944, to the Nuremberg Trials.

== See also ==
- Berlin Embassy (book)
- List of books by or about Adolf Hitler
- The Berlin Stories
