= Turn Every Page =

2022 documentary by Lizzie Gottlieb

Turn Every Page: The Adventures of Robert Caro and Robert Gottlieb
- Directed by: Lizzie Gottlieb
- Produced by: Joanne Nerenberg; Jen Small; Lizzie Gottlieb
- Starring: Robert Caro; Robert Gottlieb
- Cinematography: Mott Hupfel
- Edited by: Molly Bernstein; Kristen Nutile
- Music by: Olivier Manchon; Clare Manchon
- Production companies: Topic Studios; Left/Right; YoungLove Productions
- Distributed by: Sony Pictures Classics
- Release date: June 12, 2022 (Tribeca Film Festival)
- Running time: 113 minutes
- Country: United States
- Language: English
- Box office: $335,417

Turn Every Page: The Adventures of Robert Caro and Robert Gottlieb is a 2022 documentary film by Lizzie Gottlieb about the relationship between biographer Robert Caro and his editor, her father Robert Gottlieb.

== Synopsis ==
The film focuses on biographer Robert Caro and his editor, the documentarian's father Robert Gottlieb, as they work methodically to complete the final, fifth volume of Caro's Lyndon Johnson biography. The pair, both in their late 80s, had worked together for five decades, starting with Caro's biography of Robert Moses, The Power Broker, and continuing through Caro's first four volumes about Lyndon B. Johnson. Its story is focused on the interplay between writer and editor as they work to finish the fifth book rather than a history of their lives. The film features interviews with politicians and media personalities.

== Production ==
Though Caro and Gottlieb originally declined to be the subject of the documentary, after some convincing, documentarian Lizzie Gottlieb began filming them in 2016. At first, she only filmed them separately, at Caro's request, to avoid moments of contention. Towards the end the two are seen editing together, with music instead of sound. The film was in post-production in early 2021 and premiered at the June 2022 Tribeca Film Festival. Sony Pictures Classics acquired the film following the festival.

Robert Gottlieb died the next year, in 2023.

== Critical reception ==
On the review aggregator website Rotten Tomatoes, 96% of 50 critics' reviews are positive. Metacritic, which uses a weighted average, assigned the film a score of 81 out of 100, based on 14 critics, indicating "universal acclaim".
