= Robert Gottlieb =

American editor and writer (1931–2023)

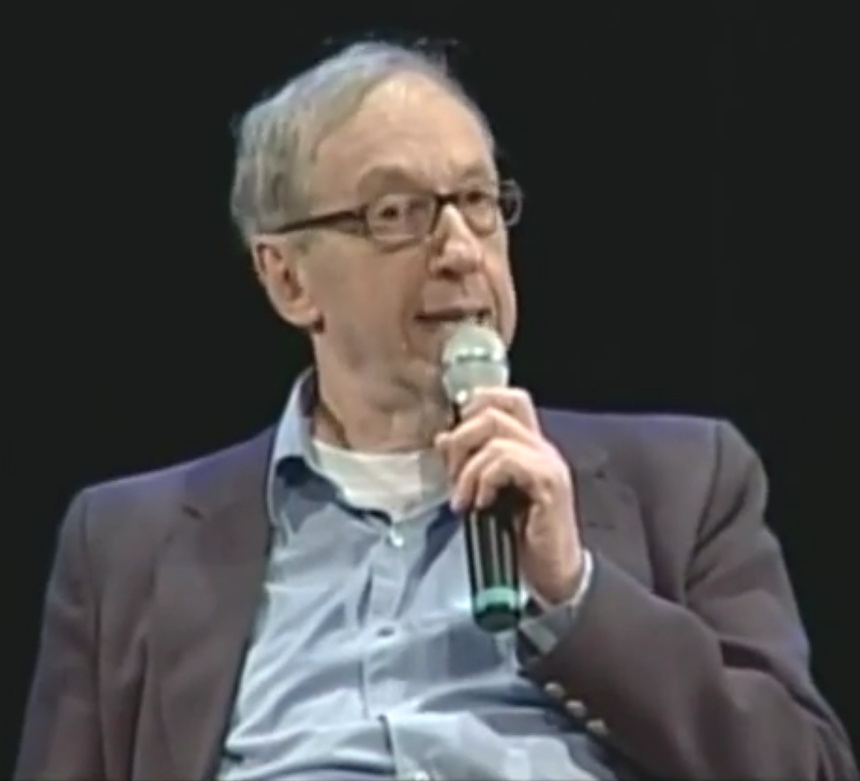
- Robert Gottlieb at C-Span event in 2011
- Born: Robert Adams Gottlieb; April 29, 1931; New York City, U.S.
- Died: June 14, 2023 (aged 92); New York City, U.S.
- Education: Columbia University (BA); Cambridge University
- Occupation: Editor
- Employers: Simon & Schuster; Alfred A. Knopf; The New Yorker
- Spouse(s): Muriel Higgins (divorced); Maria Tucci (m. 1969)
- Children: 3 (including Lizzie)

Robert Adams Gottlieb (April 29, 1931 – June 14, 2023) was an American writer and editor. He was the editor-in-chief of Simon & Schuster, Alfred A. Knopf, and The New Yorker.

Gottlieb joined Simon & Schuster in 1955 as an editorial assistant to Jack Goodman, the editorial director. At Simon & Schuster, Gottlieb became editorial director within five years and drew attention for the publishing phenomenon of Catch-22.

In 1968, Gottlieb—along with advertising and marketing executives Nina Bourne and Anthony Schulte—moved to Alfred A. Knopf as editor-in-chief; soon after, he became president. He left in 1987 to succeed William Shawn as editor of The New Yorker, staying in that position until 1992. After his departure from The New Yorker, Gottlieb returned to Alfred A. Knopf as editor ex officio.

Gottlieb was a frequent contributor to The New York Review of Books, The New Yorker, and The New York Times Book Review, and had been the dance critic for The New York Observer from 1999 until 2020. While at Simon & Schuster and Knopf, he notably edited books by Joseph Heller, Jessica Mitford, Lauren Bacall, Salman Rushdie, Toni Morrison, John le Carré, and Robert Caro, among others.

== Early life and education ==
Robert Gottlieb was born in 1931 to a Jewish family in Manhattan, New York City, where he grew up on the Upper West Side. His middle name was given to him in honor of his uncle, Arthur Adams, who is now known to have been a Soviet spy. While a child at summer camp, Gottlieb's bookish tendencies led him to a friendship with E.L. Doctorow.

Gottlieb attended the Birch Wathen School and graduated from Columbia University in 1952, Phi Beta Kappa, and was a member of the Philolexian Society. He received a graduate degree from Cambridge University in 1954.

== Simon & Schuster (1955–1968) ==
Gottlieb began his career in publishing as the editorial assistant to Simon & Schuster editorial director, Jack Goodman. Gottlieb, who had been working seasonally at Macy's and translating from French on a freelance basis, had actively looked for a publishing career since leaving Cambridge. In his memoir, he self-deprecatingly wrote that the books Simon & Schuster published were below his "exquisite literary standards" at that point, but his need for an opening into publishing made him want to take the interview.

True to fact, the company was not known for its prestige, as much as its commercial success. The first book published by the firm was famously a book of crosswords, which sold extremely well; the company also first established the children's book series Little Golden Books, which published the best-selling children's book for decades, The Poky Little Puppy, in 1942.

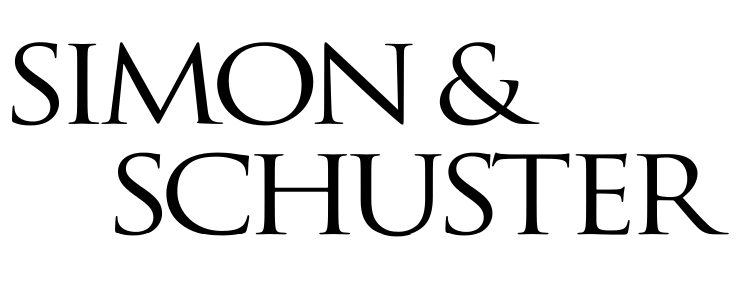
Simon & Schuster, where Gottlieb worked from 1955 to 1968

Two years after his start at Simon & Schuster, Gottlieb's boss Jack Goodman died suddenly in August 1957. Around Gottlieb's arrival, more than 5 different executives had either died or left—an exodus that included founder Richard Simon, who retired in late 1957. With the absence of Goodman, Simon, and senior editor Albert Leventhal, the firm's business chief named Gottlieb editorial director in 1959. In his memoir, Gottlieb describes the time of his leadership a "peculiarly divided" time for the company, based on differences between the old guard and the new.

An early success for Gottlieb came with Rona Jaffe's The Best of Everything (1958), which film producer Jerry Wald had commissioned—in an agreement with Goodman—before it was finished. The book's path to publication straddled Goodman's death, so Gottlieb naturally retained the responsibility for it as Goodman's assistant. The book became a film in 1959, which featured Joan Crawford and received mixed reviews.

=== Catch-22 ===
Gottlieb's first notable discovery at Simon & Schuster was Catch-22, by the then-unknown Joseph Heller. Heller's literary agent Candida Donadio sent multiple publishing houses a 75-page manuscript of the unfinished novel in the mid-1950s. Multiple periodicals and publishers found it confusing, according to Heller's biographer.

Gottlieb and Thomas Guinzburg from Viking Press both expressed interest in Heller's initial pages. Heller and Donadio went with Simon & Schuster, largely due to Gottlieb's zeal for the book. Gottlieb was still junior at Simon & Schuster, but he overrode doubts from the founder's younger brother Henry Simon, who saw nothing in the book, and the more senior editors Peter Schwed and Justin Kaplan, who found the book overly repetitive. Gottlieb did concede that the book needed extensive revisions to reconcile the comedy with the book's more searing qualities, but wrote in a 1958 report that it would provide the company prestige among "real admirers in certain literary sets."

Heller's initial completed draft of 1960 ran to 758 pages, typed. Gottlieb, working with Heller and Simon & Schuster advertising representative Nina Bourne, cut the draft by around 200 pages.

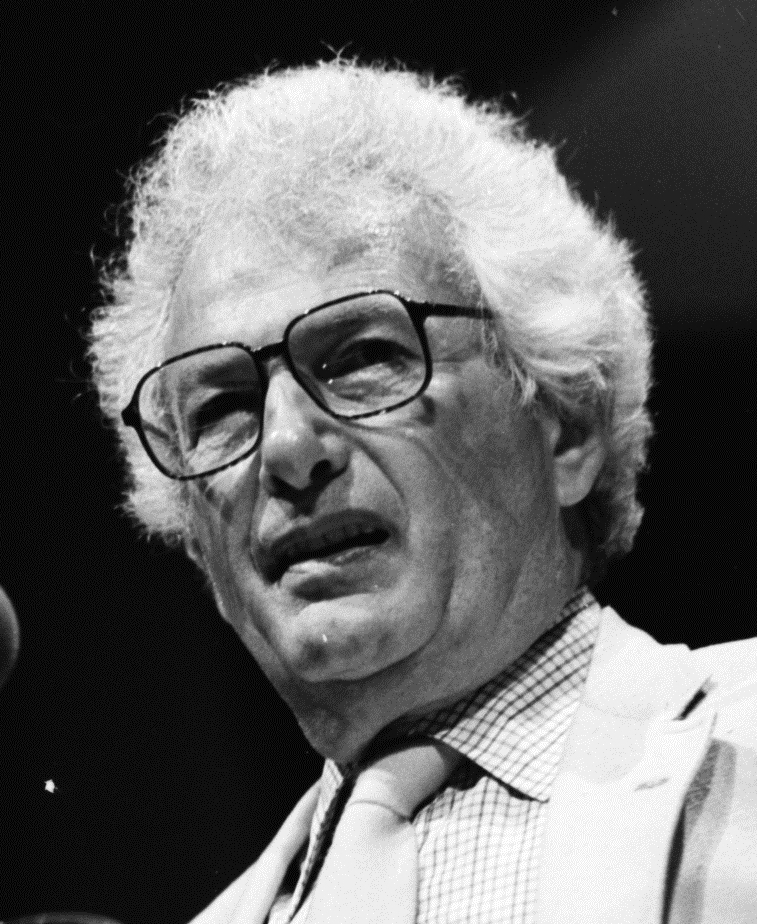
Joseph Heller, who worked with Gottlieb on Catch-22, in 1986

When published in October 1961, more than a year after its initial deadline, the book received mixed reviews, with praise from Newsweek, but pause from Time. Gottlieb and Bourne tried to engineer a positive review from the prestigious New York Times Book Review by demanding a young "with-it" reviewer, yet the review from Richard Stern dismissed the book as "emotional hodgepodge." Gottlieb and Bourne capitalized on the positive reviews from some publications and from famous writers— a group that included Harper Lee, Art Buchwald, and Nelson Algren, among others— by aggressively purchasing ads in the Times and other periodicals to display the praise.

Though the hardcover edition did not sell well enough to reach the Best Seller list, it did manage to run for six printings before Gottlieb sold the paperback rights to low-cost publisher Dell for $32,000. Dell sold 800,000 copies by September 1962 and the combined book sales exceeded 1.1 million by April 1963, a year and a half after the initial publishing. In the late 1960s, after the positive experience of Catch-22, Heller followed Gottlieb to Knopf to publish a book version of his Broadway play, We Bombed in New Haven.

==== Name origin ====
Originally titled Catch-18, Heller, Gottlieb and Donadio sensed a need to change the name so as not to compete with Leon Uris's then-upcoming war novel Mila 18. The book has competing narratives as to how it earned its titular number.

Donadio frequently claimed that the title was changed to 22 as a way to reference her birthday (October 22). Gottlieb vociferously disputed that narrative as a lie, claiming that he distinctly remembered calling Heller in the middle of the night to tell him that "22" was funnier than "18." Heller felt that the titular 22 may have derived from his offering to call the airplanes in the book "B-22s," after a legal team suggested that the military may object to usage of the name "B-25."

=== Later years, 1960–1968 ===
Former editor and Simon & Schuster historian Peter Schwed notes that Gottlieb had some luck in the early 1960s in recognizing publishing potential where others did not. Gottlieb bought the American rights to publish R.F. Delderfield's A Horseman Riding By, which every American publisher, including Simon & Schuster, had declined to try to transfer to the U.S. With a publisher-favorable contract on the expectation that it wouldn't perform, the book and other Delderfield books eventually sold millions in the U.S.

Gottlieb also bought the rights to publish John Lennon's farce, In His Own Write, shortly before Beatlemania reached the United States. He originally ordered only 2,000 books from Tom Maschler of Jonathan Cape, but the band became more popular stateside soon after the deal. Ahead of the American publishing, Simon & Schuster rushed to print a first-run of 50,000 copies, which quickly sold out.

Journalist William Shirer began writing his best-selling popular history book, The Rise and Fall of the Third Reich before Gottlieb's involvement in the company, working with editor Joseph Barnes. While Gottlieb was not the book's editor, he was in charge of its release by the 1960 publication date. Notably, he claims that he stopped a plan to split the book into two separately published volumes. The hardcover went through 13 printings, selling 1 million copies within a year (though the majority were sold through the Book of the Month Club). Off of the hardcover sales, Gottlieb auctioned the paperback rights for $400,000 to Fawcett.

==== Jessica Mitford's The American Way of Death (1963) ====
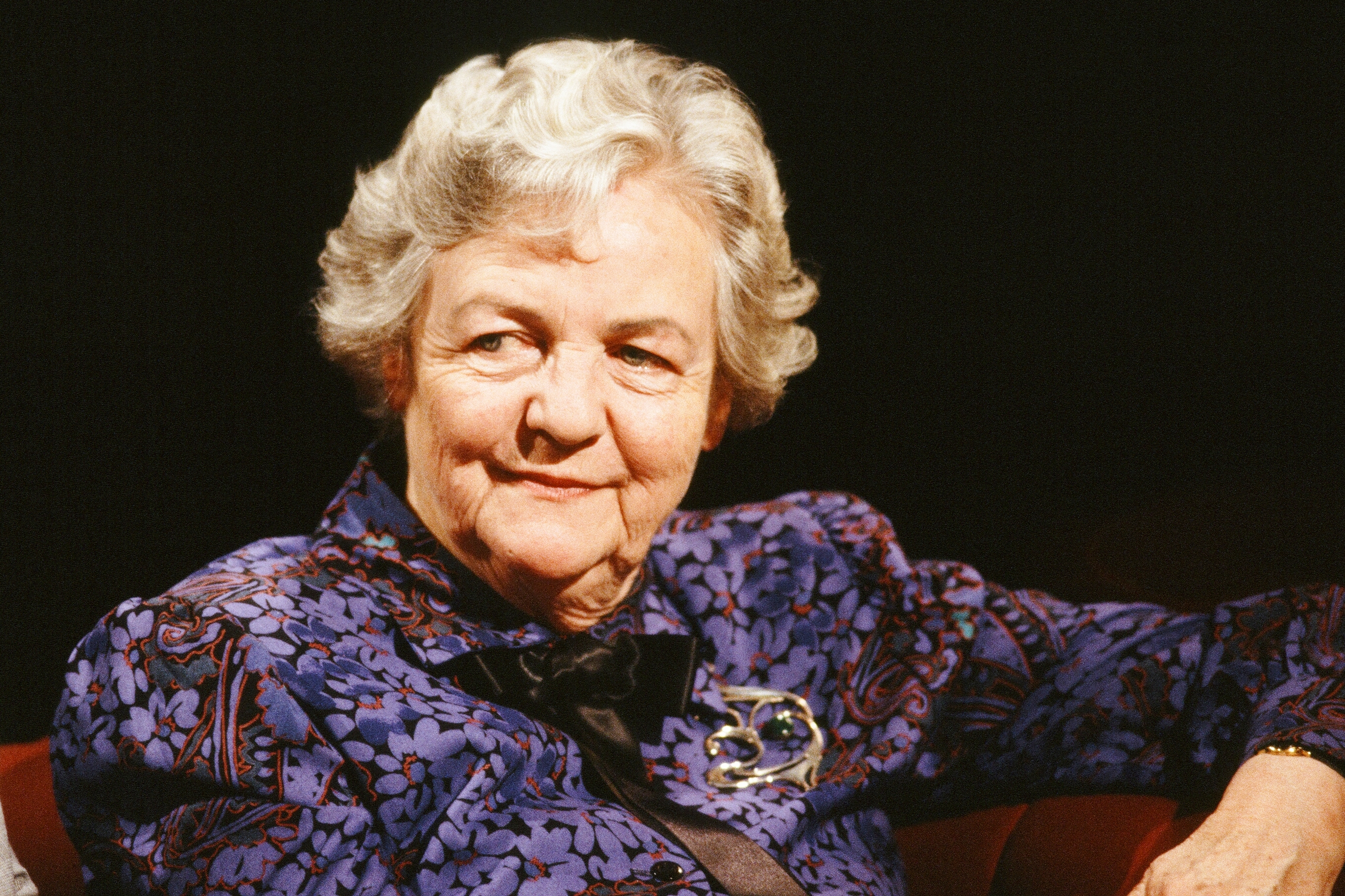
Jessica Mitford in 1988, 10 years before her revised publication of The American Way of Death, edited with Robert Gottlieb.

In 1960, writer Jessica Mitford had become a minor celebrity after publishing a memoir of her aristocratic family, Hons and Rebels. She decided to use the attention to complete a book on the American funerary industry that she had researched on and off since 1958, after her husband, civil rights lawyer Robert Treuhaft, mentioned that his union clients' funeral expenses seemed to be rising.

The book was commissioned by Houghton Mifflin, her American publisher, on the strength of their previous collaboration. The publishers found the descriptions of embalming practices unseemly and worried about legal liabilities, but when Mitford's agent Candida Donadio—who had worked with Gottlieb on Catch-22—offered it to Gottlieb, he says he "jumped" to take advantage.

The first print-run of 20,000 copies sold out on the first day of availability. The book became a phenomenon, with Mitford taking interviews on television and radio programs. The American Way of Death stayed on the best-seller list for one year, with some of it spent in the first spot. It was so influential that Robert F. Kennedy told Mitford that he initially chose the least ornate model for his brother's coffin, due to the extortionary practices she had documented.

==== Chaim Potok's The Chosen (1967) ====
One of the larger achievements of Gottlieb's Simon & Schuster came out of Chaim Potok's book, The Chosen. Gottlieb writes in his memoir that, by the time he read the draft, the manuscript had been well-traveled amongst other publishers, without any interest.

After reading and enjoying the novel, Gottlieb wrote that he was left with one impression: the 800-page manuscript was best suited as two completely separate novels. The second of the two novels, The Promise, was published by Knopf in 1969, a year after Gottlieb's move there. Though The Promise received poor reviews as the second of two halves—Time asked "how much more of the original manuscript is threatening us from Robert Gottlieb's desk drawer?"—The Chosen earned critical praise and significant readership.

==== Rejection of A Confederacy of Dunces ====
Gottlieb suffered some ignominy for rejecting A Confederacy of Dunces by John Kennedy Toole, a book that later won the Pulitzer Prize when it was published posthumously eleven years after the author's death by suicide. The editing process progressed over two years of back-and-forth letters starting from when Toole sent his manuscript, unsolicited, to Gottlieb in 1964.

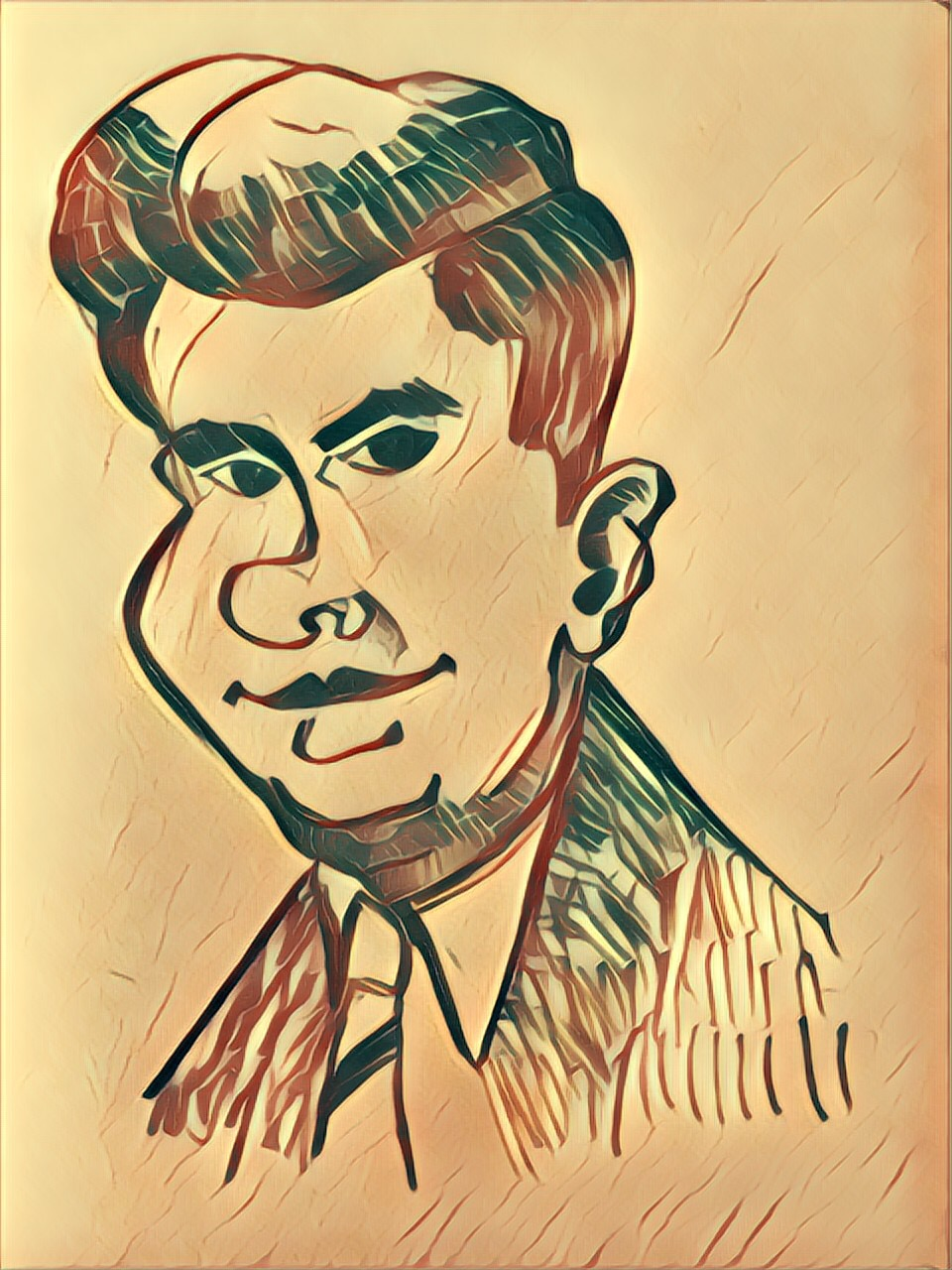
A cartoon of John Kennedy Toole, whose book A Confederacy of Dunces Gottlieb declined to publish

In the letters, Gottlieb referred to Toole as "wildly funny, funnier than almost anyone around," but said he felt his book "does not have a reason," unfavorably comparing it to Catch-22 or V. Despite the rejection, Gottlieb asked Toole if he could keep the manuscript; Toole decided that there was not a path forward and requested it be returned. Gottlieb corresponded with Toole as late as January 1966, asking him to revise and resubmit the work.

Immediately after the book won the Pulitzer in 1981, Gottlieb could not recall Toole or the manuscript. In his 2016 memoir, Gottlieb wrote that, after returning to A Confederacy of Dunces decades later, he felt the same about its flaws.

The author's mother, Thelma Toole, who had convinced a small academic press to publish the novel with a grant from the National Endowment for the Arts, fixated on Gottlieb as a source of her son's suicidal despair. Toole originally blamed Gottlieb for keeping her son "on tenterhooks" with their extended correspondence, but quickly began to use antisemitic canards, calling the editor "a Jewish creature."

Aside from A Confederacy of Dunces, Gottlieb also wrote that he had regretted his rejections of The Collector by John Fowles and Larry McMurtry's Lonesome Dove (while at Knopf).

== The New Yorker ==
In 1985, the long-independent weekly magazine The New Yorker was purchased by Condé Nast, led by chairman S.I. Newhouse. The sale of the magazine agitated its editor William Shawn, who had led the magazine since the death of founding editor Harold Ross in 1951. Shawn said he had not been properly consulted and was not yet confident that Newhouse would ensure the magazine's continued independence. Shawn also indicated that he was not planning on resigning or retiring in the near future, to maintain editorial control.

Two years later, amidst shakeups that removed Grace Mirabella from Vogue and Louis Gropp from House & Garden, Newhouse asked Gottlieb to replace Shawn as editor of The New Yorker. Gottlieb accepted the job in January 1987—to be effective at the beginning of March—ending Shawn's decades-long tenure. At the time of the announcement, Edwin McDowell of The New York Times noted that though the two editors "tend to have similar literary tastes, their personal styles are widely different." Gottlieb often dressed down and spoke casually, whereas Shawn would exude a formal air and expect the same from his subordinates.

Within a day of the hiring, more than 100 staff members and frequent writers met to discuss Shawn's ouster and Gottlieb's appointment. They wrote a letter, initiated by longtime writer and Shawn mistress Lillian Ross, asking Gottlieb to decline the position in protest of Shawn's removal. The letter received attention in the media, given The New Yorker's prestige and the fame of some signatories, such as J.D. Salinger and Janet Malcolm. Aside from their outrage over Shawn's removal, the signatories also argued that only someone who had gone through the magazine's organization could lead it. Gottlieb responded to the New Yorker staff in one paragraph, saying that he did not plan to refuse the position.

== Editing style and persona ==
Gottlieb edited novels by John Cheever, Doris Lessing, Chaim Potok, Charles Portis, Salman Rushdie, John Gardner, Len Deighton, John le Carré, Ray Bradbury, Elia Kazan, Margaret Drabble, Michael Crichton, Mordecai Richler, and Toni Morrison, and non-fiction books by Bill Clinton, Janet Malcolm, Katharine Graham, Nora Ephron, Katharine Hepburn, Barbara Tuchman, Jessica Mitford, Robert Caro, Antonia Fraser, Lauren Bacall, Liv Ullmann, Paul Simon, Bob Dylan, Bruno Bettelheim, Carl Schorske, and many others. In the documentary film Turn Every Page, Gottlieb estimated that he had edited between 600 and 700 books.

In a 1994 interview with The Paris Review, Gottlieb described his need to "surrender" to a book.

"The more you have surrendered, the more jarring its errors appear. I read a manuscript very quickly, the moment I get it. I usually won't use a pencil the first time through because I'm just reading for impressions. When I read the end, I'll call the writer and say, I think it's very fine (or whatever), but I think there are problems here and here. At that point I don't know why I think that—I just think it. Then I go back and read the manuscript again, more slowly, and I find and mark the places where I had negative reactions to try to figure out what's wrong. The second time through I think about solutions—maybe this needs expanding, maybe there's too much of this so it's blurring that."

=== Criticism ===
Despite his resume, Gottlieb had a reputation among some for his inflated self-regard. Tina Brown, who would later succeed Gottlieb as editor of The New Yorker, wrote in her published diary of one such negative impression. After a late 1987 interaction, she wrote that despite his skill as a reader and editor, she found him to be "so self-admiring and glib." Toni Morrison said in an interview that he had "an enormous ego," but that it often helped him when working with stubborn or self-important authors.

In a 2001 LA Times article by Linton Weeks, Gottlieb was referred by an unnamed author he had worked with as "the nicest guy in the world. Except for when he isn’t." Minute issues could excite him more easily than others, according to the author. In Turn Every Page, author Robert Caro speaks of his and Gottlieb's mutually terrible "tempers," which are driven, he feels, from a desire to find the best version of the book at hand.

== Personal life ==
He was the son of Charles Gottlieb, a lawyer, and Martha (née Keen), a teacher. Gottlieb married Muriel Higgins in 1952; they had one child, Roger. In 1969, Gottlieb married Maria Tucci, an actress whose father, the novelist Niccolò Tucci, was one of Gottlieb's writers. They had two children: Lizzie Gottlieb, a film director, and Nicholas (Nicky), who is the subject of one of his sister's documentary films, Today's Man. He had residences in Manhattan, Miami, and Paris.

For many years, Gottlieb was associated with the New York City Ballet, serving as a member of its board of directors. He published many books by people from the dance world, including Mikhail Baryshnikov and Margot Fonteyn. He was also a member of the Board of Trustees of the Miami City Ballet.

Gottlieb began a collection of Lucite bags and purses from the 1940s that he maintained until his death. He started to accumulate the accessories in the 1980s from flea markets after finding them to "amusing, such impractical objects." In 1988, Gottlieb featured 92 such bags, from 1949-1959 in the photo book A Certain Style. The collection—along with similar sets of "3-D dog posters, obscure Barbie dolls, and macramé owls"— was remembered as representing Gottlieb's "zappy" sense of humor.

On June 14, 2023, Gottlieb died in a hospital in Manhattan, at the age of 92.

== Legacy ==
In 2022, a documentary was released about the collaborations of Gottlieb and writer Robert Caro titled Turn Every Page. The film was directed by Gottlieb's daughter, Lizzie Gottlieb. The title comes from advice that former Newsday editor Alan Hathway had given to Caro as a young reporter on his first investigative assignment: "Hathway looked at me for what I remember as a very long time... 'Just remember,' he said. 'Turn every page. Never assume anything. Turn every goddamn page.'"

A little more than a year after his death, on July 20, 2024, some books from his personal library were sold in a book fair hosted by the Metrograph theater in Manhattan. The volumes for sale were from a small subset of his personal collection that focused on Hollywood, including biographies of Judy Garland and Roberto Rossellini, as well as collections of criticism from Dwight Macdonald and Pauline Kael.

== Bibliography ==
=== Anthologies (editor) ===
- Reading Jazz: A Gathering of Autobiography, Reportage, and Criticism from 1919 to Now (1996) (Pantheon Books)
- Reading Lyrics: More Than 1,000 of the Twentieth Century's Finest Song Lyrics (with Robert Kimball) (2000) (Pantheon Books)
- Reading Dance: A Gathering of Memoirs, Reportage, Criticism, Profiles, Interviews, and Some Uncategorizable Extras (2008) (Pantheon Books)

=== History and biography ===
- A Certain Style: The Art of the Plastic Handbag 1949-1959 (1988) (Knopf)
- George Balanchine: The Ballet Maker (2004) (Atlas Books/Harper Collins)
- Sarah: The Life of Sarah Bernhardt (2010) (Yale University Press)
- Great Expectations: The Sons and Daughters of Charles Dickens (2012) (Farrar, Straus and Giroux)
- Garbo (2021) (Farrar, Straus and Giroux)

=== Memoir and criticism ===
- Lives and Letters (2011) (Farrar, Straus and Giroux)
- Avid Reader: A Life (2016) (Farrar, Straus and Giroux)
- Near-Death Experiences . . . and Others (2018) (Farrar, Straus and Giroux)

| Preceded by William Shawn | Editor of The New Yorker; 1987–1992 | Succeeded by Tina Brown |
