= Berlin Embassy =

1940 non-fiction book by William Russell

- First edition
- Author: William Russell
- Language: English
- Genre: Memoir
- Publisher: E.P. Dutton
- Publication date: November 30, 1940
- Publication place: United States
- Media type: Print
- Pages: 240
- ISBN: 1-904027-14-8

Berlin Embassy is a non-fiction book written by American diplomat William Russell (1915–2000) which was first published in late 1940. Russell, who worked at the American Embassy in Berlin, details his experiences of living and working in Nazi Germany between August 1939 and April 1940 during the early phases of the Second World War.

== The work ==
The book describes William Richard Russell's experiences between August 31, 1939 to April 10, 1940, dealing with long queues of desperate people seeking emigrant visas, the outbreak of the Second World War, the German invasion of Poland and Phoney War, as well as touching on the beginning of the invasion of Norway.

Russell was a clerk on the consular staff of the American Embassy in Berlin. The book consequently reflects his personal experiences of life in Berlin during the early stages of the war through anecdotes, press cutting, rumours and jokes rather than covering the political and diplomatic aspects of his job in any great detail: The bilingual Russell socialized extensively with random Germans in pubs and nightclubs, on trains while conducting business, in rural villages as well as in the capital.

I am not a politician, so I have not written a political book.
I have put down the small things that happened to small people in the hope that they would give the best picture of Germany as it is today.

Despite this professed objective, the final chapter is devoted to a study of the character of Adolf Hitler.

=== Main argument ===
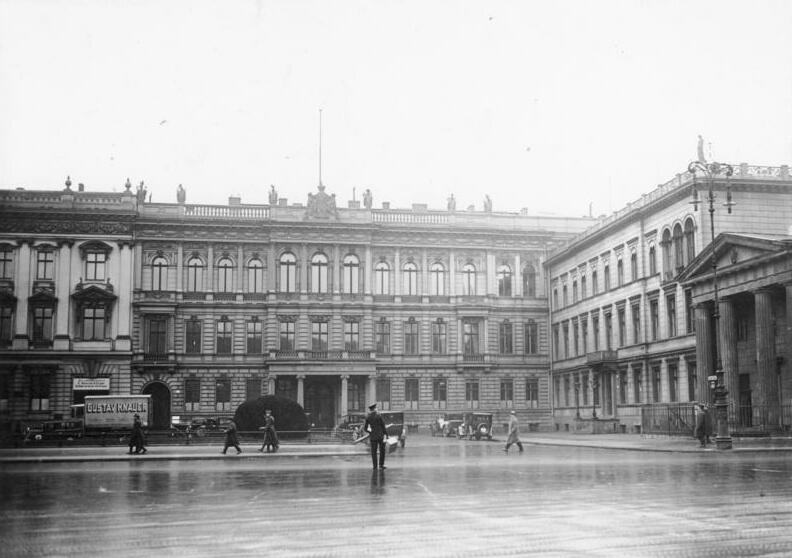
The American Embassy in Berlin during the period in which Russell was writing: the former Blücher Palace

The central argument which Russell attempts to communicate in his work is that, contrary to opinion in America and elsewhere, the majority of Germans were politically apathetic or even anti-Nazi, with only a small minority actually being overtly in favour of the status quo:

There are, perhaps, 2 million members of the Nazi party. That is not many in a nation of seventy million people.

However, he also argues that a large number of Germans (regardless of their political views) chose to side with the Nazis temporarily for the duration of the war:

For what exists in Germany today, I have ... a simple illustration:
...Imagine that Herbert Hoover were still president of the United States, and as unpopular as he was at the time he was defeated for the Presidency. Imagine that the United States had been forced into a war under his leadership. He would be supported by every man, woman and child...
Many people feel that way in Germany today. They will support Adolf Hitler until the war is won; as soon as it is over, they have the firm intention of getting rid of him.

Russell attempts to highlight the cynical view of many Germans towards the Nazi régime. In particular, he focuses on the popular views of key Nazi figures - including Hermann Göring ("When Goering appears on the movie screen...Berlin audiences usually snigger."), Rudolf Hess, Heinrich Himmler, Julius Streicher ("...has committed so many crimes and stolen so much money from the Party that even the Nazis could not cover up his crimes any longer") and Hans Kerrl ("...a gay old rascal frequently seen in Berlin dives until the wee hours of the morning"). Above all, Joseph Goebbels (whom Russell describes as "...the most hated man in Germany...") is seen to elicit the most hatred. "In three years spent in Germany," Russell wrote "I have never heard one kind word spoken on his behalf."

Jokes of the time are frequently inserted to summarise the contempt of many ordinary Germans to the Nazi leaders.

=== Other themes ===
Several factors of the everyday life of Germans during the period which Russell writes about extensively were shortages of food and clothing owing to rationing (even though the war had just begun), the shortage of home heating fuel, breakdowns and freezing conditions in train service, and the lack of proper information on current affairs, owing to censorship and propaganda in the German media. This led, in Russell's belief, to over-reliance on both frequently incorrect rumours and the (officially prohibited) BBC German-language radio service.

== Editions ==
- The first edition of Berlin Embassy was published in the United States by E.P. Dutton & Co in 1940/1.
- An unedited reprint was produced (for the United Kingdom market exclusively) by Elliott & Thompson in 2003.
- Basic Books produced another reprinted version in November 2006.

== See also ==
- Berlin Diary
