= Maria Tucci =

American actress (born 1941)

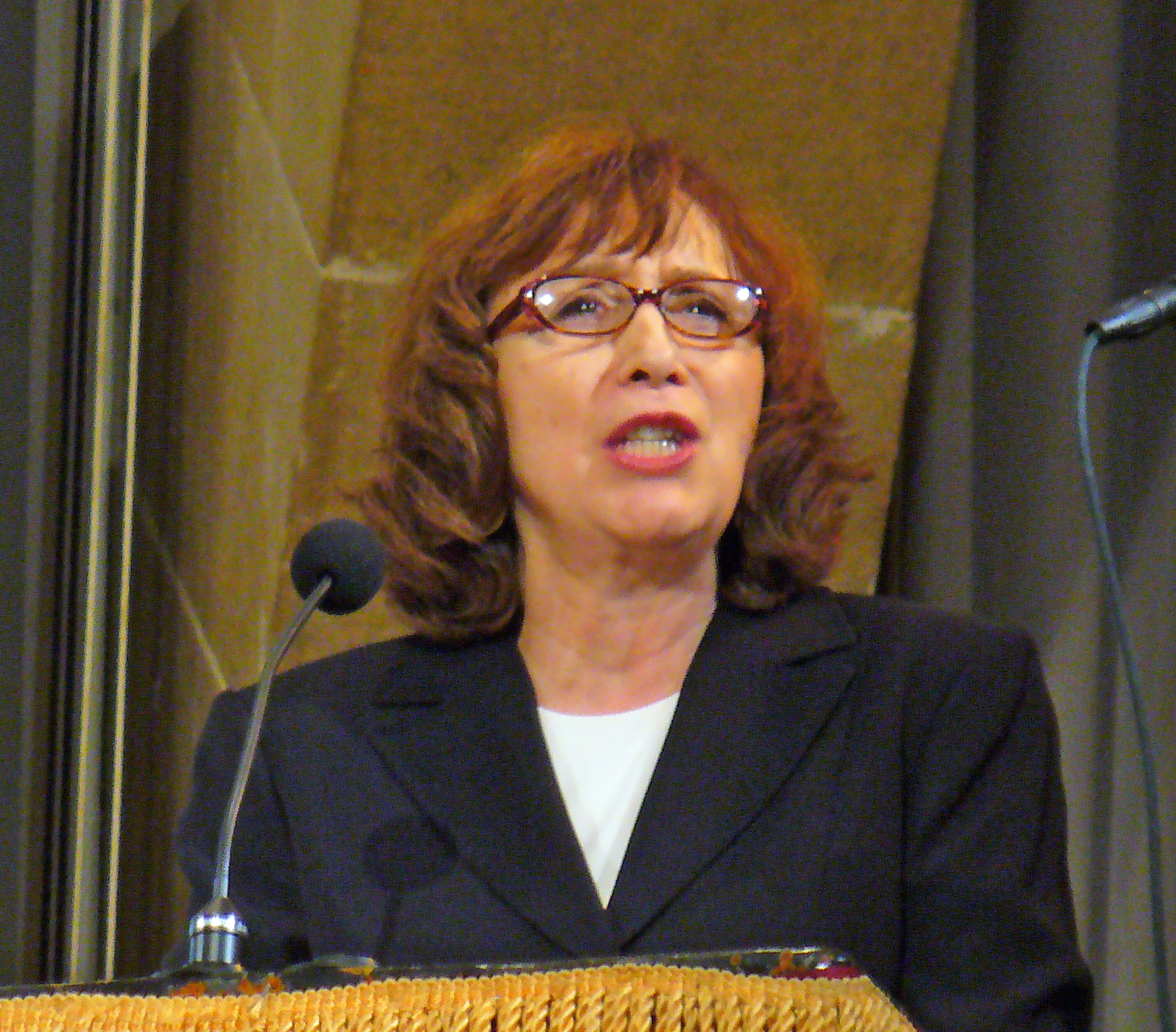
- Tucci in 2007
- Born: June 19, 1941 (age 85); New York City, U.S.
- Occupation: Actress
- Years active: 1963–present
- Spouse: Robert Gottlieb (1969–2023; his death)
- Children: 2

Maria Tucci (born June 19, 1941) is an American actress. She was nominated for the Tony Award for Best Featured Actress in a Play in 1967 for her performance in The Rose Tattoo. She played Koula in the 2015 miniseries The Slap. She also won an OBIE award for her performance as Phaedo in "Talk" by Carl Hancock Rux at the Joseph Papp Public Theater.

== Personal life ==
Tucci was born in New York City, the daughter of Laura Tucci (née Rusconi; 1911–1989) and Niccolò Tucci (1908–1999), a writer. She has a brother, Vieri. Her parents came to America in 1938 to escape from World War II. Tucci began her acting education at a young age, studying with Lee Strasberg and Joseph Papp. She briefly attended Barnard College.

She was married to Robert Gottlieb from 1969 until his death in 2023. They moved into the Turtle Bay Gardens Historic District in 1973, where she became friends with neighbors such as Janet Malcolm, who was a fellow working mother married to an editor. Tucci and Gottlieb opened their home to various well-known visitors including Kate Reid, Doris Lessing, Edna O’Brien, and Nora Ephron, who moved in with her two sons during her divorce. Tucci had two children: Lizzie Gottlieb, a documentary filmmaker, and Niccolo, "Nicky," whose life with Asperger syndrome was the subject of Lizzie's film Today's Man. In addition to their Manhattan residence, Tucci and Gottlieb acquired homes in Miami and Paris. They also had a home in Dutchess County NY next door to the famed children's book writers Martin and Alice Provensen.

== Film and television ==
Tucci began appearing in film in 1969. Her first credits were in Robert Frank's Me and My Brother and a CBS Playhouse production titled Shadow Game. She played Lisa in Sidney Lumet's 1983 film Daniel. In Gus Van Sant's 1995 film To Die For she portrayed Angela Maretto.

== Theatre ==
Tucci made her Broadway debut in 1963, in The Milk Train Doesn't Stop Here Anymore. She has fourteen Broadway credits. Principal roles include Rose Delle Rose opposite Maureen Stapleton in the 1966 production of The Rose Tattoo by Tennessee Williams. In 1967 she starred as Alexandra Giddens in a revival of The Little Foxes by Lillian Hellman, with Anne Bancroft as her mother. In 1969 she was a replacement for Jane Alexander in The Great White Hope. In 1988, she starred in a revival of The Night of the Iguana as Hannah Jelkes. In 2009, she appeared in the production of Mary Stuart as Hanna.

Tucci began her career off-Broadway. One of her earliest credits is a 1963 production of The Trojan Women. In 1986, she starred in a production of A Man for All Seasons as Alice More. Tucci played the role of Ruth Steiner in Collected Stories, in its 1997 New York debut. The play was nominated for the Pulitzer Prize for Drama. In 2014, she appeared in a production of Love and Information at the Minetta Lane Theatre. Regionally she has performed in many shows with the Long Wharf Theatre and the Williamstown Theatre Festival.
