= Embassy of the United States, Berlin =

Diplomatic mission of the United States of America in the Federal Republic of Germany

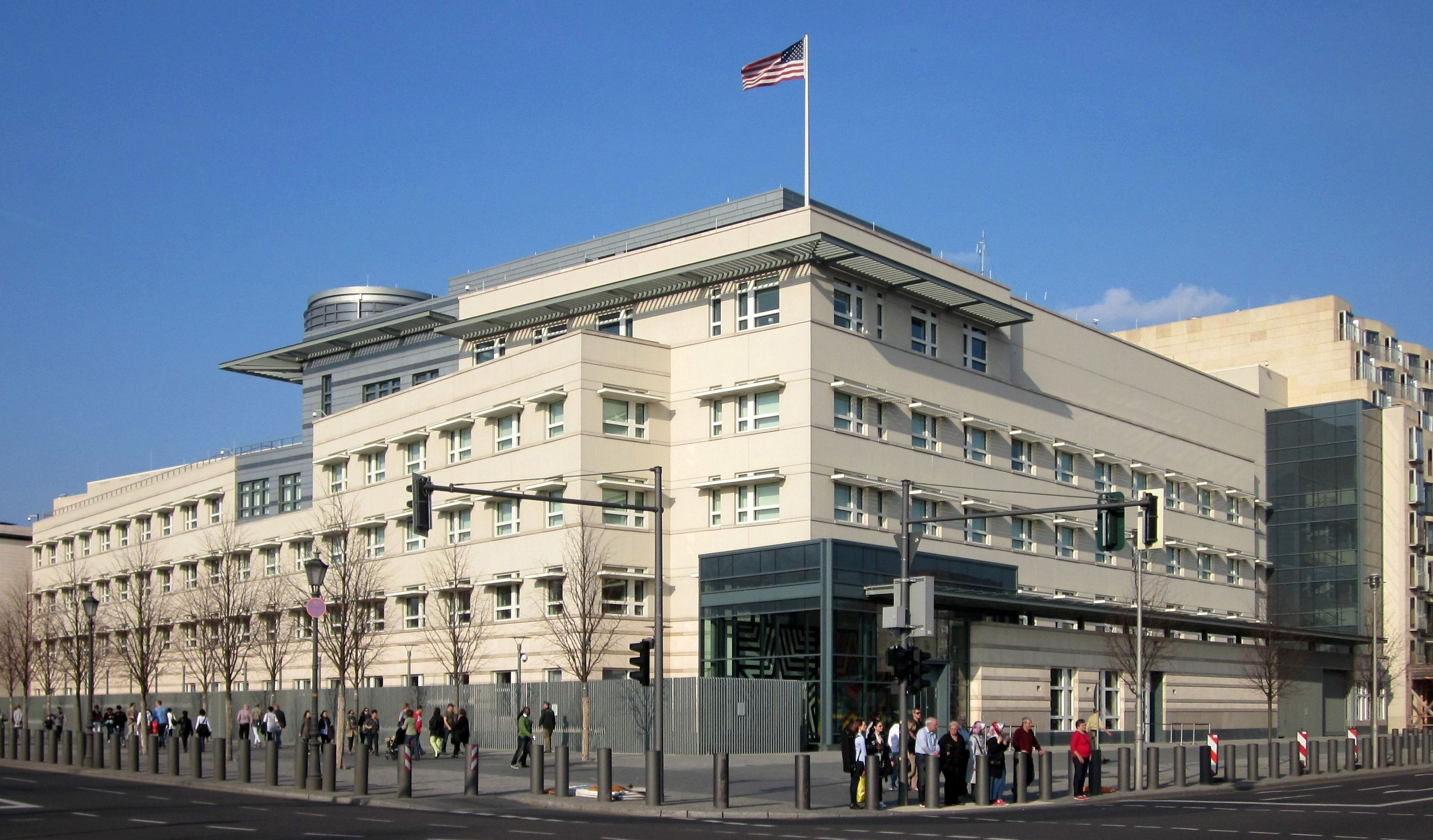
- Embassy seen from the southwest in 2011
- Location: Pariser Platz 2 Berlin, Germany
- Coordinates: 52.515278°N 13.378333°E
- Opened: July 4, 2008; 18 years ago
- Jurisdiction: Germany
- Chargé d'affaires: Alan D. Meltzer
- Website: Official website

The Embassy of the United States of America in Berlin (German: Botschaft der Vereinigten Staaten in Berlin) is the diplomatic mission of the United States of America in the Federal Republic of Germany. It started in 1797, with the appointment of John Quincy Adams to Berlin, the capital of Prussia. There was no permanent building for the embassy until 1930, with the purchase of the Blücher Palace. During the United States involvement in World War II, the embassy ceased operations.

During the Cold War, the United States had two embassies: one in Bonn, the capital of West Germany, and one in East Berlin, the capital of East Germany. In 1999, the embassy would fully be moved back to Berlin, and as of September 2021, it is located at Pariser Platz.

== Embassy history ==
=== 1797–1930 ===
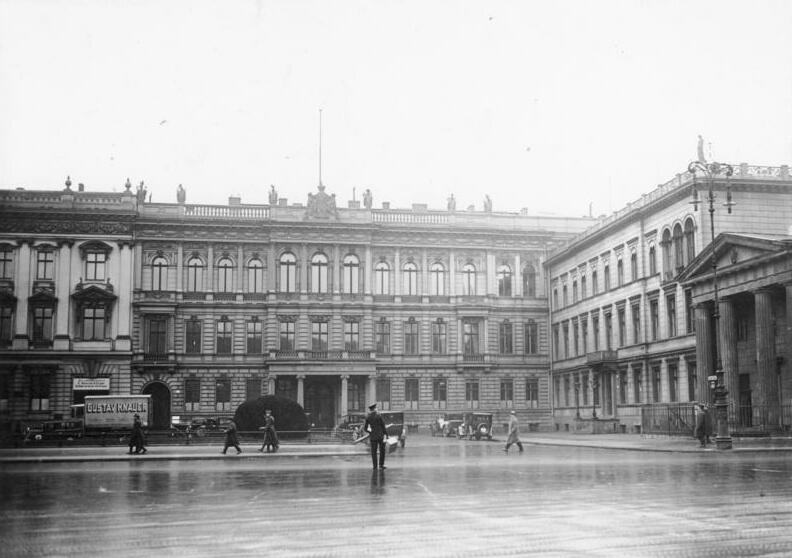
Blücher Palace, the embassy building on Pariser Platz in 1932

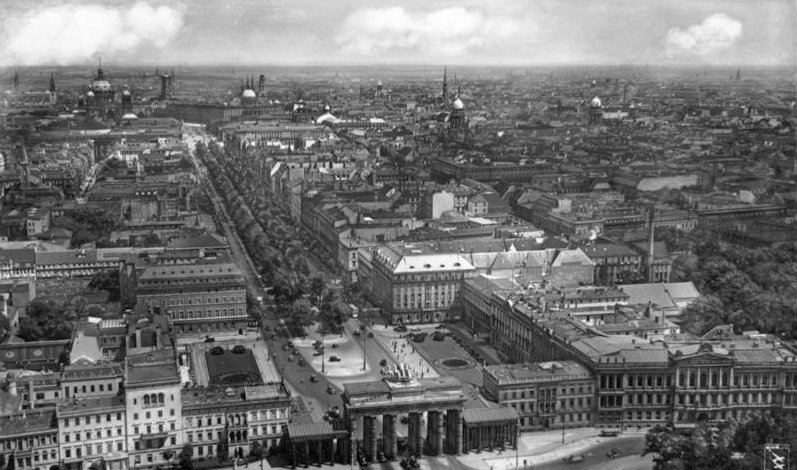
Future American Chancery building on the far right, on Pariser Platz

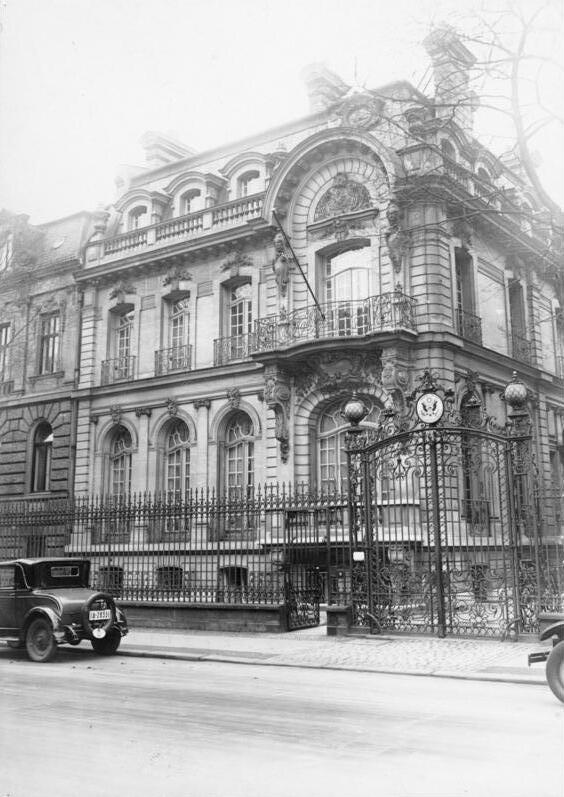
Embassy building on Bendlerstraße, 1928

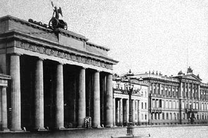
Brandenburg Gate (left) next to the Blücher Palace (far right)

The U.S. Embassy in Berlin probably began with the 1797 appointment of John Quincy Adams to the then capital of Prussia, Berlin. At the time these missions in Berlin, Prussia were called legations, and there were other American legations in other parts of what would later become a unified German state. There were breaks in these formative years of German-American diplomatic relations where there was no official American diplomatic presence in Berlin. After the late 19th century the term embassy would be used to describe the American mission to the new unified German empire. There was also a break in relations with Germany during World War I. In these early years the embassy (or legation) of the U.S. in Berlin changed as frequently as a new ambassador changed his residence, the two being the same. The last temporary embassy location was on Bendlerstraße 39 (now Stauffenbergstraße), close to the Tiergarten.

No permanently selected building was used as an embassy throughout this period as was common at the time.

=== 1930–1941 ===
In 1930 the Blücher Palace, located on Pariser Platz, was purchased as a new and permanent home for the U.S. Embassy in Berlin. There was a fire in the Blücher Palace on April 15, 1931, before it could be fully utilized and converted for embassy use. Money shortages in America, due to the Depression, plus soured relations with the Nazi regime (after 1933) further delayed the refurbishing of the damaged building. In fact Ambassador Dodd asked the State Department not to rebuild or refurbish on the site because of the use of Pariser Platz as a Nazi showcase for rallies and marches. In the meantime the embassy operated out of a location in the Tiergarten area on Stauffenbergstraße (then known as Bendlerstraße). In 1938 Ambassador Hugh Wilson (Dodd's replacement) was recalled to the U.S. by President Franklin D. Roosevelt in protest over the Kristallnacht (the rampage orchestrated by the Nazis against Jews in Germany). In 1939 American embassy staff moved into the chancery on Pariser Platz, now refurbished and usable, but made the move somewhat under duress because Nazi building head Albert Speer had ordered embassies in the Tiergarten area vacated in preparation for the grand Nazi city plan called Germania.

From 1939 to 1941 there was no ambassador assigned to Berlin; the embassy was led by a chargé d'affaires. With World War II underway, and the U.S. still a non-combatant, the staff at the embassy had placed large letters spelling "USA" on the roof of the building hoping this might help avert British bombings. Nevertheless, British bombing of Berlin brought bomb damage to the U.S. Embassy chancery and its temporary closure – or so it was thought. Four days after the attack on Pearl Harbor the U.S. and Germany were at war; the embassy ceased operations altogether and its personnel were interned for five-and-a-half months at Jeschke's Grand Hotel, a resort in the spa town of Bad Nauheim. U.S. chargé d'affaires Leland B. Morris and American diplomat George F. Kennan were part of this interned group. The Swiss, as a neutral state, took over the embassy building on Pariser Platz for the rest of the war.

U.S. Consul William Russell wrote a book about his experiences during the early stages of World War II in the book Berlin Embassy.

=== Mission Berlin (1945–1990) ===
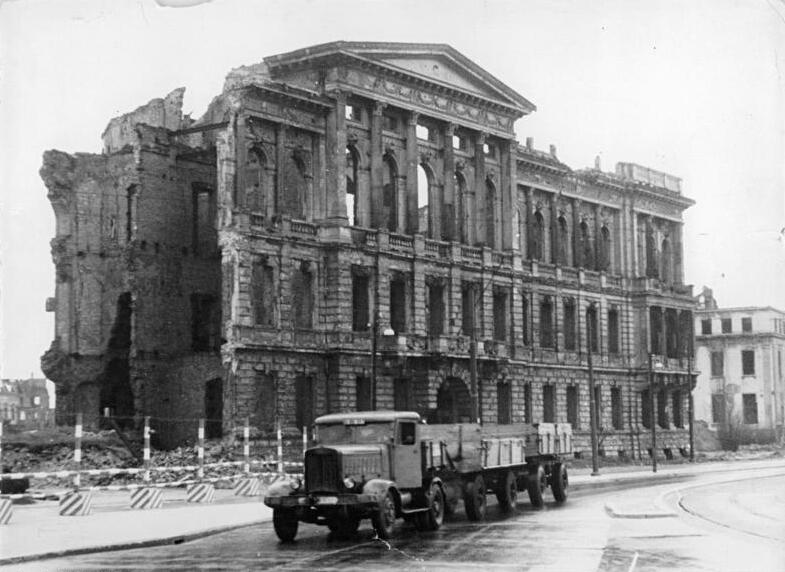
Ruins of the embassy in 1957, shortly before demolition

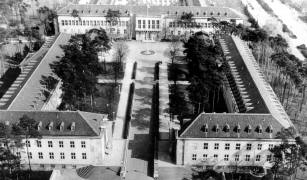
US Embassy Clay Allee building, the L-shaped building on left, seen here when it was part of the entire Berlin Brigade compound in the late 1940s

At war's end the U.S. Embassy, now even more severely damaged by months of Allied bombing, was just barely inside East Berlin (Soviet sector), straddling the demarcation between the Soviet and British sectors. The East German government would later demolish the ruins of the embassy building in April 1957. In 1949 Bonn became the capital of West Germany, and a U.S. Embassy was opened there. The Soviet-supported state of East Germany (GDR) was set up at the same time, and despite Allied objections, East Berlin was made its capital. For many years, the United States did not recognize East Berlin as the capital of the GDR, asserting that a reunified Berlin should only be the capital of a reunified Germany, thus the embassy in the temporary West German capital in the small college town of Bonn.

However, in lieu of an embassy, the U.S. State Department had a presence in West Berlin called U.S. Mission Berlin (also sometimes referred to with the acronym USBER). Mission Berlin was located on Clayallee in an upscale suburban part of West Berlin called Zehlendorf. Berlin was an occupied city (a title held until 1994, when foreign forces officially left Berlin), with a status very different than any other part of East or West Germany. Under these conditions U.S. Mission Berlin was in many matters under the authority of the commanding U.S. General in West Berlin, and not under the authority of the U.S. Embassy in Bonn, thus operating in a historically unique position. The General in charge would sometimes give direction and orders to U.S. State Department personnel as the need arose. Perhaps the best example of this involved Edwin Allan Lightner, head of the U.S. Mission (c. 1959–1963) who was involved in the Checkpoint Charlie incident of 1961, which led to a standoff of American and Soviet military forces. Nevertheless, the Mission also wielded considerable influence in its own right: if the city of Berlin wanted to nominate someone into the higher ranks of the city police department, the U.S. Mission would have to approve the nomination for it to go forward—an example of occupation power authority vested in the U.S. Mission.

The U.S. Mission to Berlin was housed in a building that was part of a series of structures that formed the former headquarters of the Luftwaffe for Berlin defense during the Nazi years. This complex became the headquarters of the Berlin Brigade, part of the United States Army Berlin command in Berlin during the Cold War years. On the end of some of these buildings were Nazi ornamentations. The purely Nazi symbols were removed, but large cement eagles can still be seen at the corners of some of the buildings (including the one to be used by U.S. Mission Berlin) minus the swastikas that used to be below their feet.

The complex had numerous buildings, several of which were quite large. One of these had one portion of one its wings serve as the U.S. State Department's Consular functions. Unique to Berlin at that time, U.S. Army Military Police served as guards to this U.S. State Department facility, instead of the normal Marine Security Guard contingent at all other U.S. embassies. The presence of U.S. Marines at the Mission might have been seen as a movement towards establishing a full-fledged embassy, which the U.S. was careful to avoid.

=== Embassy in East Berlin (1974–1990) ===
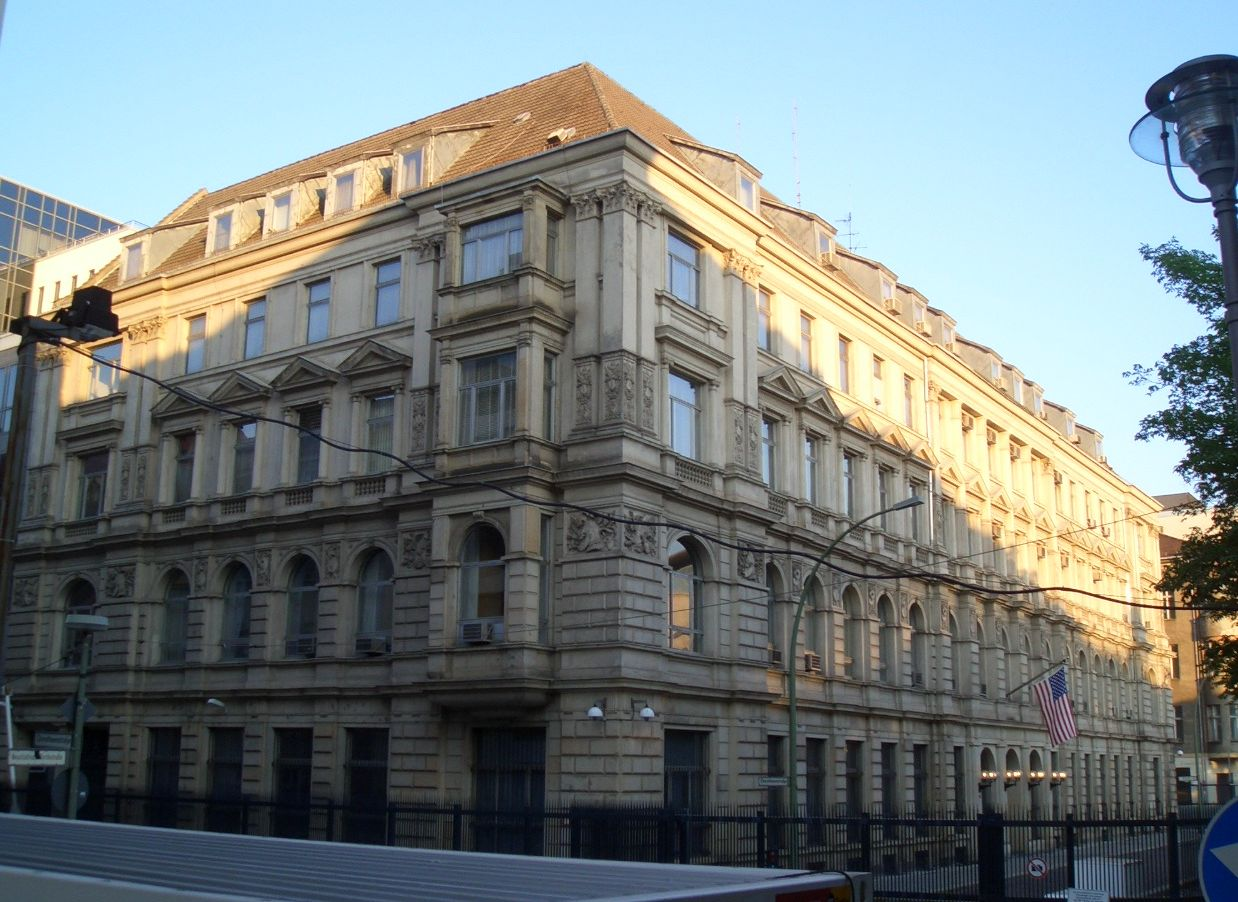
Former U.S. Chancery in Mitte district at Neustädtische Kirchstrasse

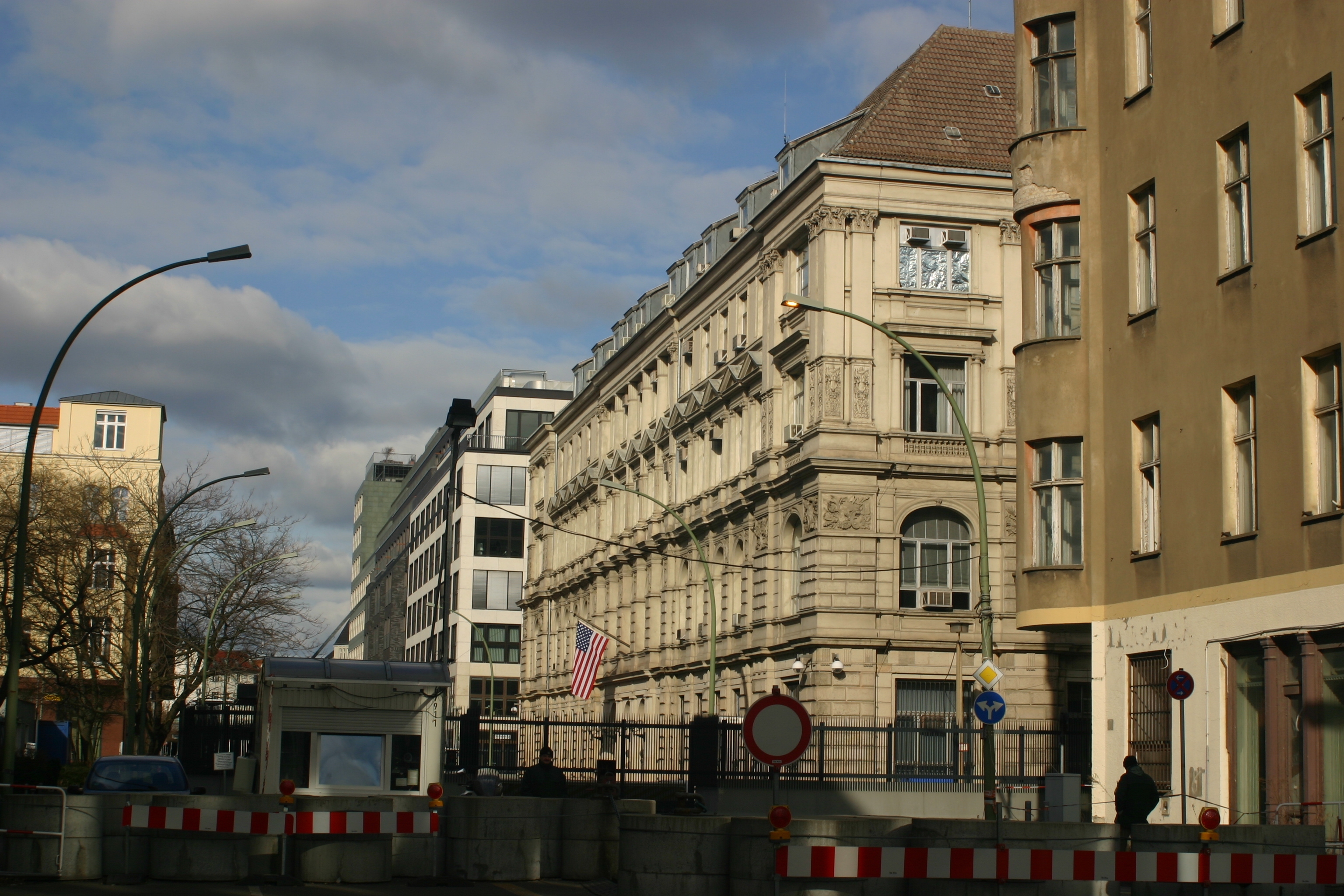
Former U.S. Chancery at Neustädtische Kirchstrasse (seen from south)

Throughout the time Berlin was under four-power control, the U.S. was insistent that Berlin, East or West, should not be considered a capital until Berlin was unified. Relations with the East German state were hampered because of this policy, and by the erection of the Berlin Wall in 1961. The wall made the site of the former U.S. Embassy, still owned by the U.S. government, an inaccessible vacant lot that was part of the security zone separating east and west Berliners. The site became accessible after the Berlin Wall came down in November 1989, but remained a vacant lot until the 2004 groundbreaking for construction of a brand new U.S. Embassy.

In the early 1970s the U.S., along with most other western states, decided to grant diplomatic recognition to East Germany. However, this recognition did not extend to recognizing East Berlin as part of the GDR or its capital. The treaties establishing the U.S. Embassy in East Berlin referred only to East Germany's "seat of government". Since 1977, the facility was located at Neustädtische Kirchstrasse 4-5, several blocks from the former Palais Blücher site in the Mitte district. The embassy building was built in the late 19th century as a club for Prussian officers, and after World War I became the home to a craft guild. This five-storey, gabled building was leased to the U.S. by the East Germans. The building no longer retains any of its original interior features. The exterior retains much of its original stone facade.

=== 1990–present ===
With the fall of the Berlin wall and the unification of Berlin in 1989–1990, the U.S. State Department found itself with two main office facilities in one city: a chancery in the former East Berlin, Mitte district (U.S. Mission to East Germany), and the Clay building in the Zehlendorf district of the former West Berlin (U.S. Mission Berlin). In accordance with the reality of a unified Berlin that was now part of the Federal Republic of Germany, the Department of State announced that, effective October 3, 1990, the status of the United States Embassy to East Germany and of the United States Mission Berlin were to be changed. The two missions were 'closed' and replaced by a single representation under the title United States Embassy Office Berlin. It was further announced that this new entity would function as an integral part of the U.S. Embassy to the Federal Republic of Germany located in Bonn. From 1990 to 1998 Embassy Office Berlin would act as a satellite of the embassy in Bonn.

The 1990 announcement also indicated that "during a transition phase, some functions, including consular services for Berlin and the territory of the former GDR, will also be carried out at the location of the present United States Mission at Clayallee". That 'transition phase' would turn into what is seemingly a permanent presence in the Clay compound for some of the embassy's functions.

For several more years (1990–1994) Allied and Soviet/Russian forces remained in Berlin. In 1994 American, British, French, and Russian forces removed their remaining troops, leaving Berlin no longer an occupied city. In September 1998 the embassy in Bonn began a year-long migration to Berlin, and for that year there was, as the U.S. Embassy described it, "one Embassy, two locations". Contentions arose during this period as not all locally hired embassy personnel in Bonn were needed in Berlin. Some employees quit, some were transferred to other U.S. facilities in Germany (other than Berlin or Bonn), and some transferred to Berlin.

Starting in 1999, the U.S. Embassy in Germany was located only in Berlin. 1941 was the last time Berlin had been the host city to an American Embassy. Until 2008 the embassy continued to operate from the Chancery (the Neustädtische Kirchstrasse 4-5 building in the Mitte district of Berlin) and an Annex (the Clayallee building). The new building officially opened on July 4, 2008.

Consular functions are still carried out at the Clay building, as they were during the occupation. Many Berliners still commonly refer to the Clayallee building as the "Consulate", even though it is an annex of the embassy. After the U.S. Army left Berlin in 1994, this building in its entirety became a U.S. State Department facility. The other buildings which were part of the Clay headquarters (U.S. Army) have largely reverted to the German government. The Clay building is located in the southern part of Berlin 6 kilometres (3.7 mi) from the main chancery.

Since 2001, the streets around the Neustädtische Kirchstrasse building had been closed and heavily fortified with barriers and fencing. These security measures were removed as soon as the embassy had completely moved to the Pariser Platz building in May 2008. They officially reopened on 4 July 2008.

==== Non-German employees ====
Virtually all of the locally hired employees at the U.S. Embassy to East Germany (1977–1990) were not German, but were from other countries—a group sometimes still called TCNs (third-country nationals). This was so because it was believed the extremely hostile intelligence threat precluded trusting any locally hired personnel (i.e., East Germans) in East Berlin. Many of the TCNs working in East Berlin were from the United Kingdom or other western European nations, and virtually all of them had to commute from residences in West Berlin. It was also not unusual to see similar nationalities employed in the U.S Mission in West Berlin, although they probably formed only a minority, with locally hired Germans predominating. Among the non-American staff at the U.S. Embassy Berlin, there is still a large minority contingent of non-Germans.

== Pariser Platz site ==
U.S. Chancery, left, under construction at Pariser Platz

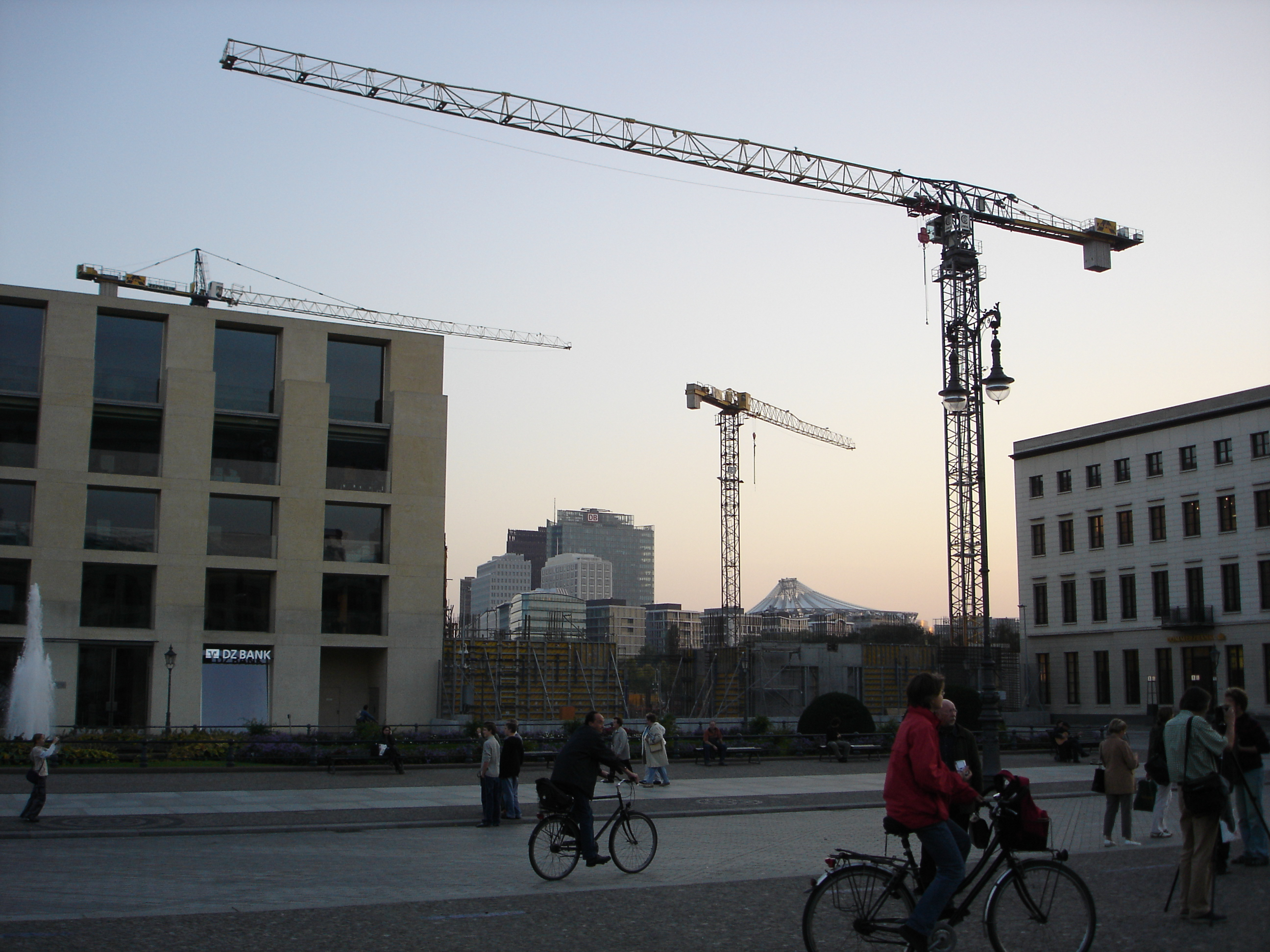
The construction site (October 2005)

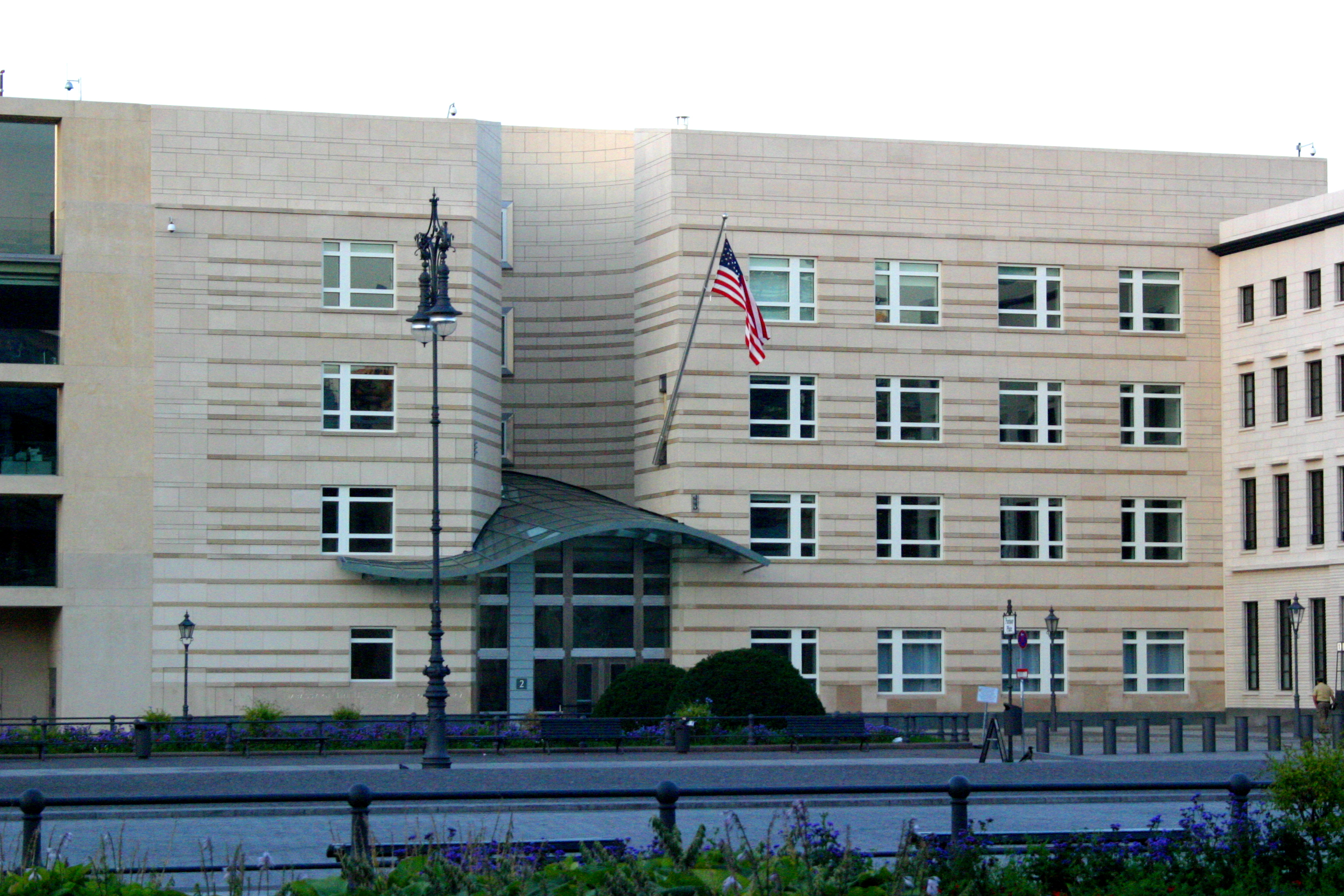
The new embassy, opened on July 4, 2008

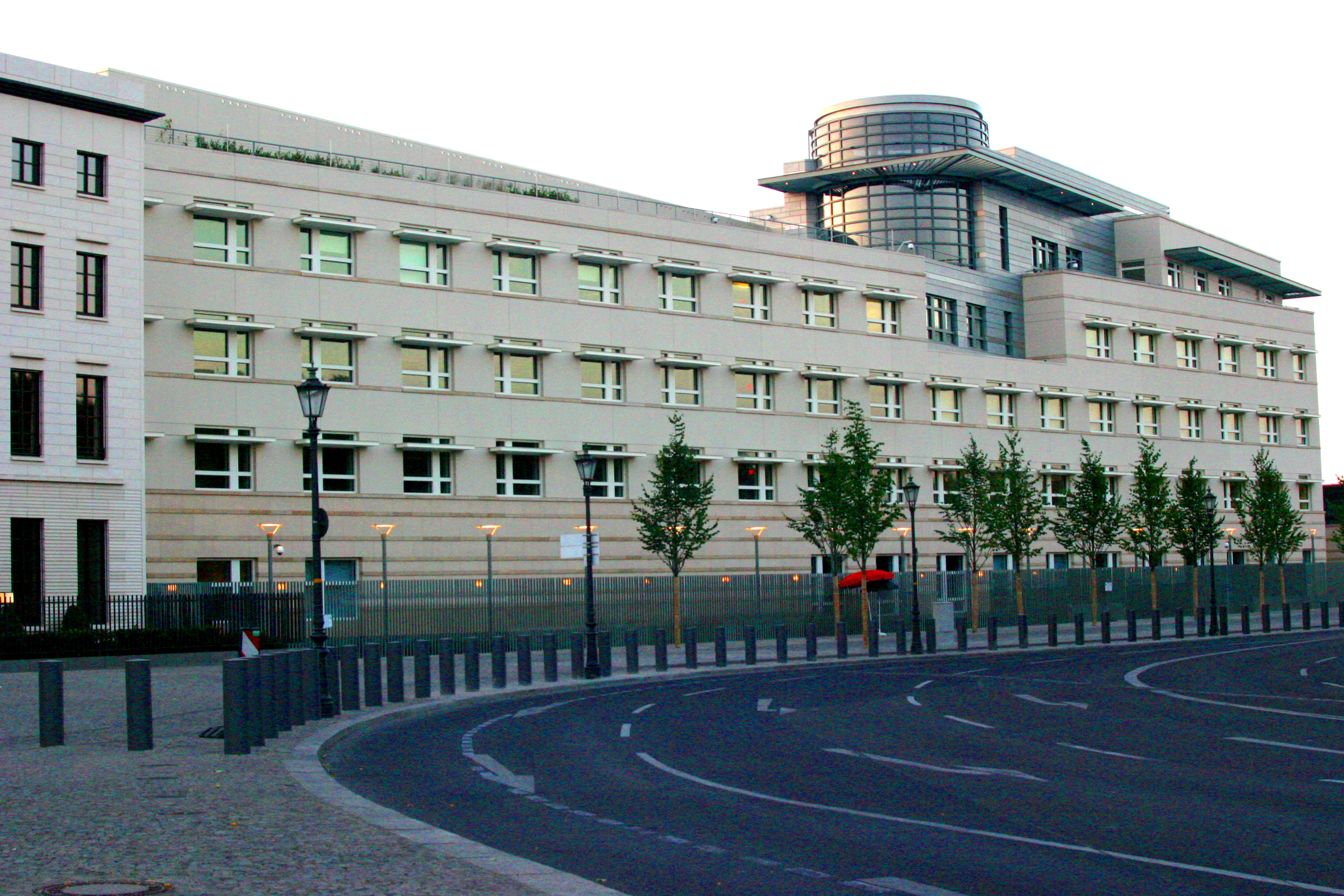
West side of the new building

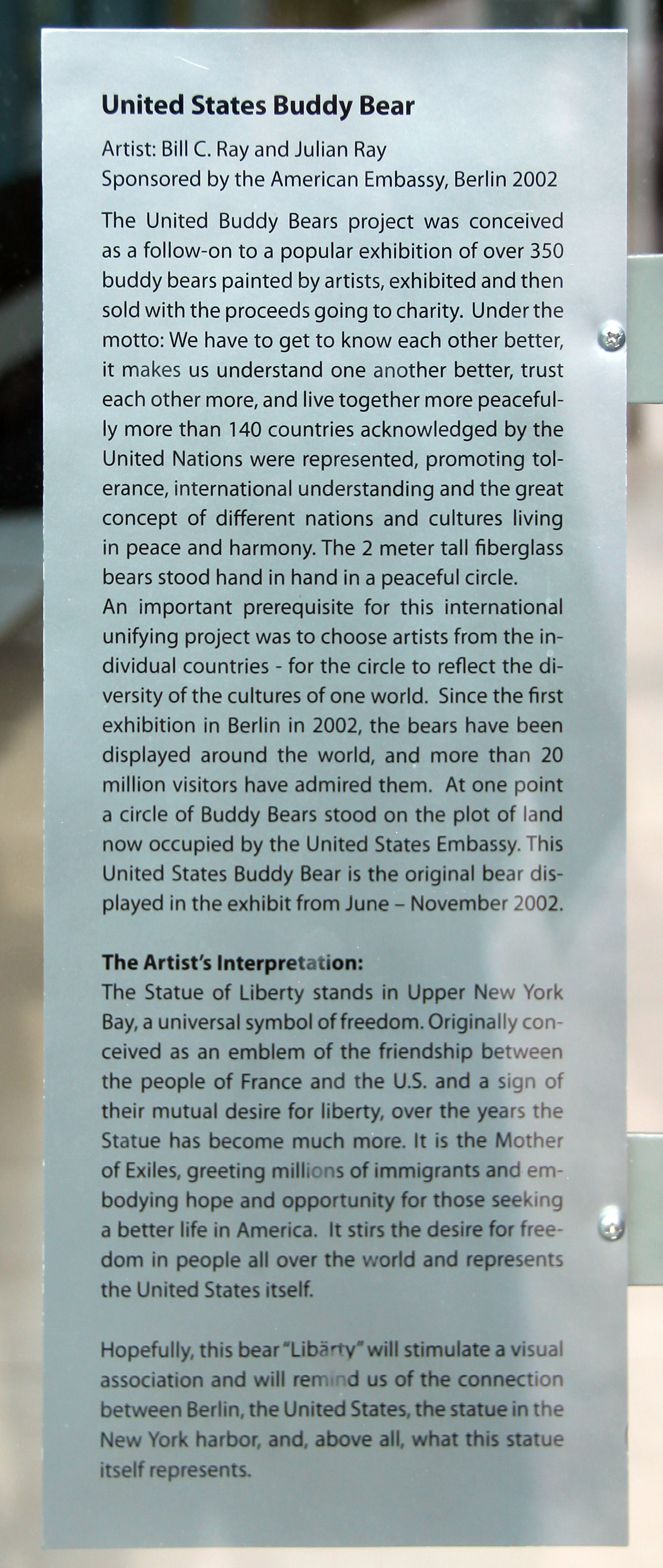
Plaque with regard to the exhibitions of the United Buddy Bears in 2002 and 2003, then still undeveloped on the grounds of the U.S. Embassy

The new 180 million euro Embassy building, conceptualized in 1996 by Moore Ruble Yudell, has its main entrance facing north towards the Pariser Platz. Its eastern side abuts an existing bank building, and the west side of the land faces Ebertstraße. The south side also faces a street, towards the German Holocaust memorial. Pariser Platz has the Brandenburg Gate at its western entrance. The small Haus Sommer building, also housing a bank, is in between the northwest corner of the new U.S. Embassy and the Brandenburg Gate. Close to the Pariser Platz and the new embassy is the Reichstag building, home to the German Bundestag. Located on Pariser Platz, or on the same city blocks that surround Pariser Platz are the French and British embassies as well as the Hotel Adlon. With the exception of the Brandenburg gate, which was heavily damaged in World War II, all other former structures that surrounded Pariser Platz were destroyed during the war, or were demolished by the East German government by about 1960. From 1960 through German Reunification in 1990, Pariser Platz held only open fields on both sides of the major boulevard Unter den Linden. In 1992, the governments decided that a new American embassy building would be built on the site, and in 1993 a memorial announcing these plans was placed in the open field.

Construction of all of the replacement buildings on Pariser Platz was begun in the mid-1990s, and by the late 1990s, this construction was complete, with one exception: the proposed building for the American Embassy. The United States was the last large Allied nation to have its plans for an embassy building in Berlin carried out. France moved into its new embassy in 2000, and the United Kingdom in 2002. Both of these are in the area of the Pariser Platz.

The design for the new embassy, by American architectural firm Moore Ruble Yudell Architects & Planners, was finalized in 1996. Since that time, and until construction started in 2004, parts of the building design were changed many times, largely due to security considerations and the sometimes conflicting wishes of the Berlin government to retain free public access around all buildings on the Pariser Platz site. Delays in funding by the U.S. Congress further delayed construction, and the project languished for a time. Nevertheless, waivers to U.S. government security standards were in place virtually from the beginning. After the 1998 United States embassy bombings and the subsequent focus on embassy security, the waiver of security standards was rescinded by the Diplomatic Security Service, the law enforcement and security arm of the U.S. State Department. High-level talks between the U.S. and German governments over security issues at the Pariser Platz site took place for almost five years before an agreement was reached and a new security waiver was issued, this time by U.S. Secretary of State Colin Powell. The security waiver stood after the September 11, 2001 attacks.

The main sticking points for the U.S. side had been the amount of stand-off distance between the public street and the embassy facade, with fears of a vehicle-borne bomb being the biggest factor taken into consideration. The proposed realignment of the street on the west side of the proposed chancery was met with alarm by historical preservationists, who argued that the street realignment would take away from the Brandenburg gate's appearance. Also, on the south side of the proposed chancery is the German national Holocaust memorial, the Memorial to the Murdered Jews of Europe. This memorial was itself mired in deep controversy during its planning and construction. There had been concerns that moving the street south of the proposed chancery might impinge on the Holocaust memorial.

Slight variations to the above referenced streets bordering the embassy site were agreed upon by the U.S. State Department. Anti-ram bollards that fit architecturally with Pariser Platz were also agreed upon.

On October 6, 2004, construction began. The completion of the main structural parts of the building on October 10, 2006, was cause for a German construction ritual called Richtfest (i.e., the topping-out ceremony).

The new embassy building is not large enough to accommodate the large number of personnel of the American Embassy. The Clay Allee building continues to be used. Parking is limited at the new embassy.

The German news media strongly criticized the aesthetics of the new American embassy building, often calling it banal and ugly—especially as compared with the embassies of many other nations in Berlin. For example, the German daily newspaper Die Welt ran the headline "Ugly but safe – the new US-Embassy"

== Mission Germany ==
The American Embassy in Berlin oversees all of the American diplomatic functions in Germany, including the American consulates in Düsseldorf, Frankfurt, Hamburg, Leipzig, and Munich. There are also a few additional offices located in Bonn, the former federal capital, but there is no longer a consulate there.

The U.S. Department of State has referred to the group of related offices as "Mission Germany". In 2019, their annual budget was $153 million. Each consulate has operated in a designated consular region composed of one to five German states, with the American consulate in Frankfurt having additional regional responsibilities in Europe and other nearby areas. American consulates-general have these areas of responsibility:

- The Consulate-General in Düsseldorf covers the most populous state: North Rhine-Westphalia
- The Consulate-General in Frankfurt covers Hesse, Rhineland-Palatinate, Baden-Württemberg, and Saarland
- The Consulate-General in Hamburg covers Bremen, Hamburg, Lower Saxony, Mecklenburg-Vorpommern, and Schleswig-Holstein
- The Consulate-General in Leipzig covers Saxony, Thuringia, and Saxony-Anhalt
- The Consulate-General in Munich covers the largest state: Bavaria

The Consulate-General in Frankfurt is the largest American consular post in the world. It is the home of the overseas offices of the U.S. Department of State and numerous federal agencies whose officers travel from Frankfurt in carrying out their regional duties.

As of March 2025, the second Trump administration planned to close the consulate in Hamburg (amongst other closures in Western Europe including consulates in Florence, Italy; Strasbourg, France; and Ponta Delgada, Portugal).

== Amerika Haus Berlin ==
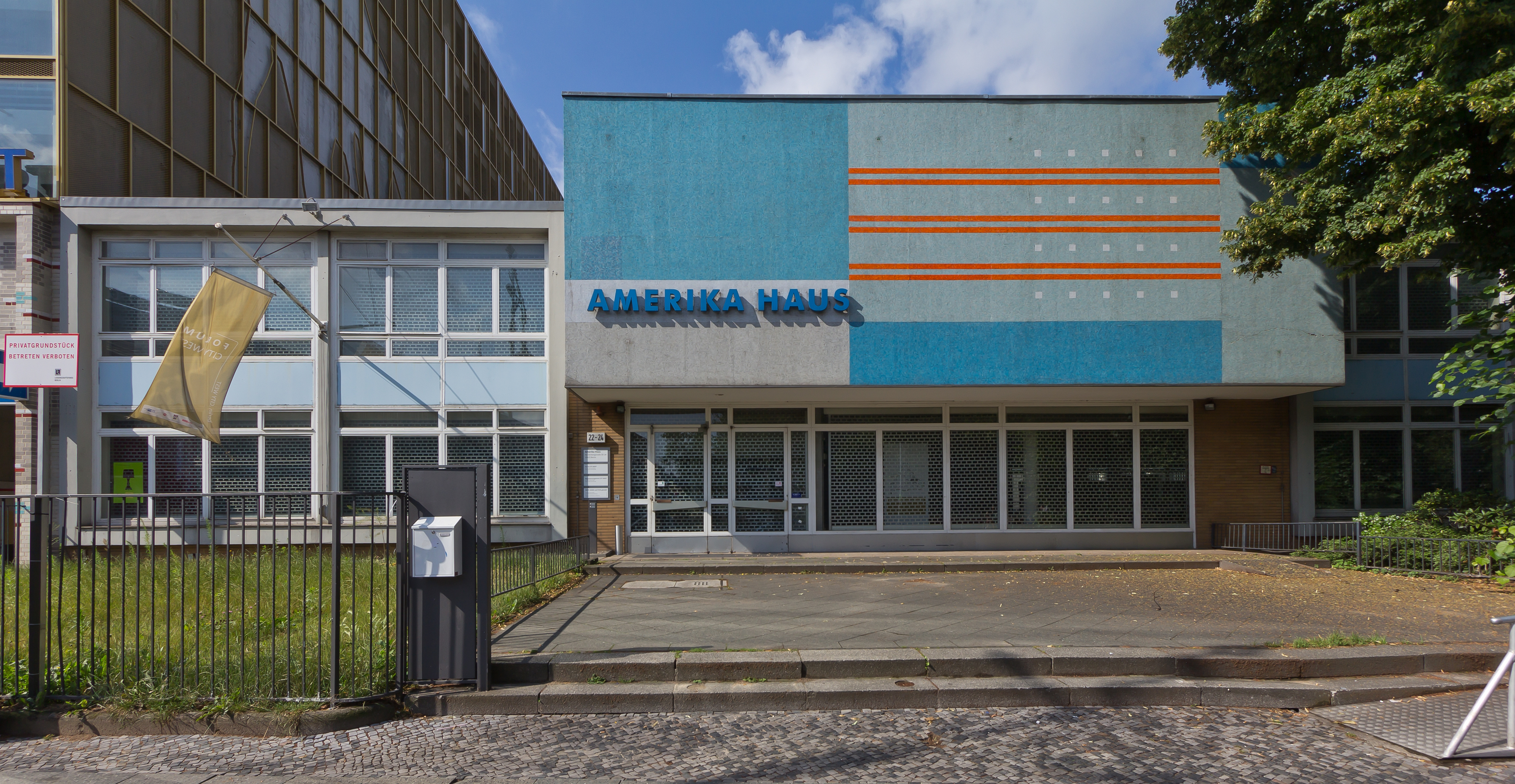
Amerika Haus Berlin

From 1946 until 2006, the Amerika Haus Berlin, located near the Zoo station and the Kurfürstendamm, provided an opportunity for German citizens to learn about American culture and politics and engage in discussion about the Transatlantic relationship. For many years a somewhat autonomous operation of the former U.S. Information Agency (USIA), it was later brought under the umbrella of the head of U.S. Mission Berlin. It lost its independence in the late 1990s when USIA was absorbed into the State Department. On 25 September 2006, the Amerika Haus was closed and the building returned to the city of Berlin.

== Former ambassadors and significant embassy personnel ==
For historic West Germany and Unified Germany see:

- United States Ambassador to Germany

For East Germany see:

- United States Ambassador to East Germany

Significant personnel:

- Alexander C. Kirk
- Leland B. Morris
- George F. Kennan
- Edwin Allan Lightner (head of U.S. Mission Berlin, 1959–1963)
- Harry J. Gilmore (last head of U.S. Mission Berlin, became the first Principal Officer of Embassy Office, Berlin in October 1990)
- Richard M. Miles (Principal Officer of Embassy Office, Berlin, 1991–1992)

== Mobile phone interception activities ==
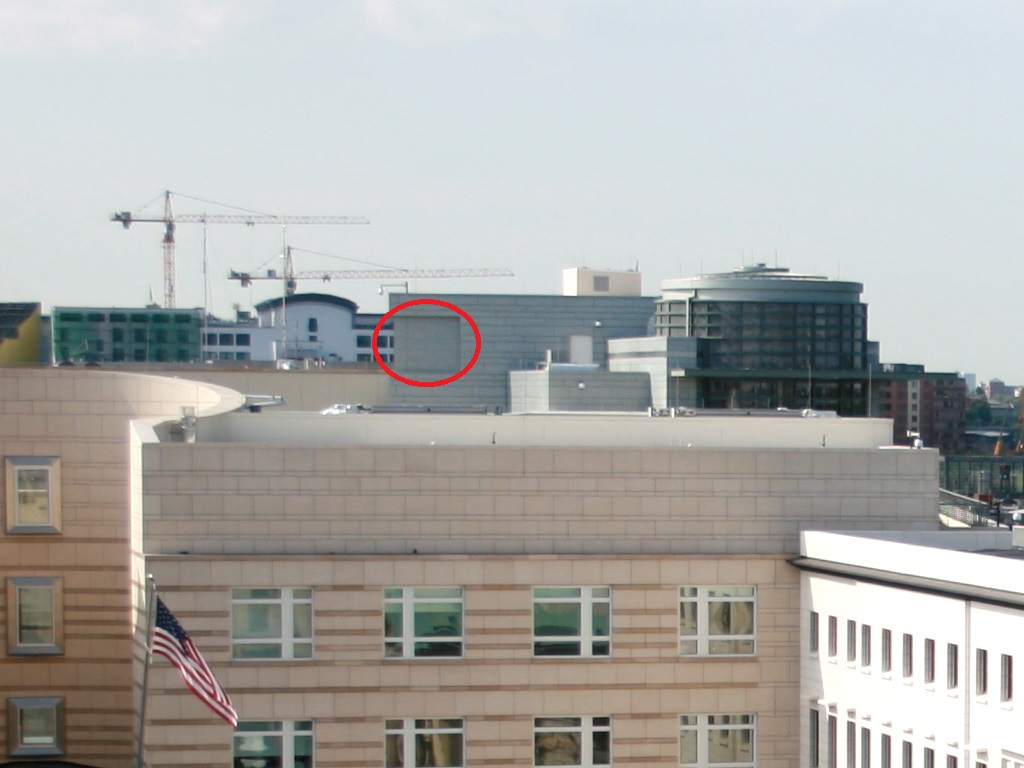
Veneered rooms in the penthouse floor of the Berlin embassy

During the Snowden disclosures, it became obvious that the top floor of the Berlin embassy had been used for tapping mobile phone calls in the whole Berlin government district, including the mobile phone of Chancellor Angela Merkel. Both the British investigative journalist Duncan Campbell and NSA expert James Bamford recognized a special shielding made from dielectric material used to veneer the top floors of other U.S. embassies in the world, which are accused of hosting operations of the worldwide Special Collection Service program. The claims have been underpinned by thermographic photos published by the German television network ARD, showing an intense emission of infrared radiation in the suspected top floor rooms.

== See also ==
- Embassy of Germany, Washington, D.C.
