= William L. Shirer =

American journalist, war correspondent, and author (1904–1993)

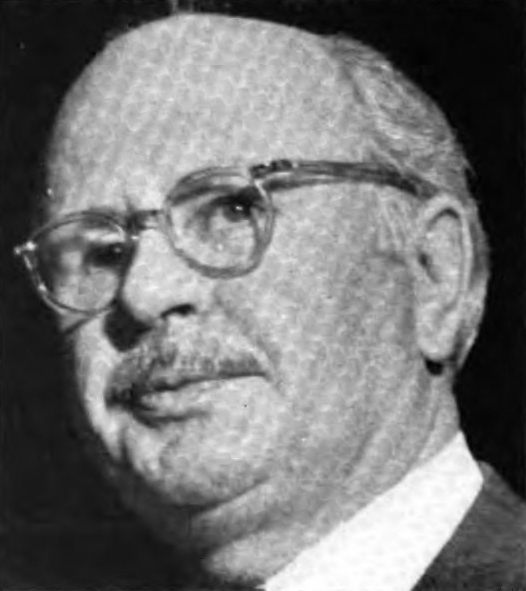
- Shirer c. 1954
- Born: William Lawrence Shirer; February 23, 1904; Chicago, Illinois, U.S.
- Died: December 28, 1993 (aged 89); Boston, Massachusetts, U.S.
- Education: Coe College
- Occupations: Journalist, historian
- Spouses: Theresa Stiberitz (m. 1931; div. 1970) Martha Pelton (m. 1972; div. 1975) Irina Alexandrovna Lugovskaya (m. 1987)
- Children: 2

William Lawrence Shirer (/ˈʃaɪrər/; February 23, 1904 – December 28, 1993) was an American journalist, war correspondent, and historian. His history of Nazi Germany, The Rise and Fall of the Third Reich (1960), has been read and cited in scholarly works for more than 60 years; its 50th anniversary was marked by a new edition of the book.

As a young man just out of college, in 1925 Shirer was hired by the Chicago Tribune and later worked for the International News Service; he was the first reporter hired by Edward R. Murrow for what became a CBS radio team of journalists known as "Murrow's Boys". He became well known for his broadcasts from Berlin, from the rise of the Nazi dictatorship through the first year of World War II. Together with Murrow, on Sunday, March 13, 1938, he organized the first broadcast world news roundup, a format still followed by news broadcasts.

Shirer published 14 books besides The Rise and Fall of the Third Reich, including Berlin Diary (published in 1941), The Collapse of the Third Republic (1969), several novels, and a three-volume autobiography, 20th Century Journey (1976 to 1990).

== Personal life ==
Shirer was born in Chicago in 1904. His father, a lawyer, died of peritonitis in 1913, when Shirer was 9 years old. The family moved to Cedar Rapids, Iowa. Shirer attended Washington High School and Coe College in Cedar Rapids. He graduated from Coe in 1925. He had to deliver newspapers and sell eggs to help the family finances. After leaving school he worked on the local newspaper, but ultimately was determined to leave Iowa. Working his way to Europe on a cattle boat with the intention of spending the summer, he remained there for fifteen years.

He was a European correspondent for the Chicago Tribune from 1925 to 1932, covering Europe, the Near East and India. In India he formed a friendship with Mahatma Gandhi. Shirer lived and worked in Paris for several years starting in 1925. He left in the early 1930s but returned briefly to Paris in 1934 and then after Hitler's establishment of the Third Reich worked as a correspondent in Berlin from 1934 to 1940.

In 1931, Shirer married Theresa ("Tess") Stiberitz, an Austrian photographer. The couple had two daughters, Eileen ("Inga") and Linda. Shirer and his wife divorced in 1970. In 1972 he married Martha Pelton, whom he divorced in 1975. His third and final marriage was to Irina Lugovskaya, a long-time teacher of Russian at Simon's Rock College. Shirer and Irina had no children.

Shirer was residing in Lenox, Massachusetts, at the time of his death. Records and writings from Shirer's life are available at the George T. Henry College Archives at his alma mater, Coe College.

== Prewar years ==
As a journalist, Shirer covered the strengthening one-party rule in Nazi Germany from August 1934, reporting on Adolf Hitler's peacetime triumphs such as the return of the Saarland to Germany and the remilitarization of the Rhineland.

Shirer at first worked for the Berlin bureau of Universal Service, one of William Randolph Hearst's two wire services. In Berlin Diary, Shirer described this move as going from "bad to Hearst". When Universal Service folded in August 1937, Shirer was first taken on as second man by Hearst's other wire service, International News Service, then laid off a few weeks later.

On the day when Shirer received two weeks' notice from INS, he received a wire from Edward R. Murrow, European manager of Columbia Broadcasting System, suggesting that the two meet. A few days later in Berlin, as he recounts in The Nightmare Years, Murrow offered Shirer a job subject to an audition – a "trial broadcast" – to let CBS directors and vice presidents in New York judge Shirer's voice. Shirer feared that his reedy voice was unsuitable for radio, but he was hired. As European bureau chief, he set up headquarters in Vienna, a more central and more neutral spot than Berlin. His job was to arrange broadcasts, and early in his career he expressed disappointment at having to hire newspaper correspondents to do the broadcasting; at the time, CBS correspondents were prohibited from speaking on the radio. Shirer was thus the first of the "Murrow's Boys" broadcast journalists who provided news coverage during World War II and afterward.

CBS's prohibition of correspondents talking on the radio, viewed by Murrow and Shirer as "absurd", ended in March 1938. Shirer was in Vienna on March 11, 1938, when the German annexation of Austria (Anschluss) took place after weeks of mounting pressure by Nazi Germany on the Austrian government. As the only American broadcaster in Vienna (NBC rival Max Jordan was not in town), Shirer had a scoop but lacked the facilities to report it to his audience. Occupying German troops controlling the Austrian state radio studio would not let him broadcast. At Murrow's suggestion, Shirer flew to London via Berlin; he recalled in Berlin Diary that the direct flight to London was filled with Jews trying to escape from German-occupied Austria. Once in London, Shirer broadcast the first uncensored eyewitness account of the annexation. Meanwhile, Murrow flew from London to Vienna to cover for Shirer.

The next day, CBS's New York headquarters asked Shirer and Murrow to produce a European roundup, a 30-minute broadcast featuring live reporting from five European capitals: Berlin, Vienna, Paris, Rome, and London. The broadcast, arranged in eight hours using the telephone and broadcasting facilities of the day, was a major feat. This first news roundup established a formula still used in broadcast journalism. It was also the genesis of what became CBS World News Roundup, on the network each morning and evening until March 2026. At the time it was network broadcasting's oldest news series.

Shirer reported on the Munich Agreement and Hitler's occupation of Czechoslovakia before reporting on the growing tensions between Germany and Poland in 1939 and the German invasion of Poland that launched World War II on September 1, 1939. During much of the pre-war period, Shirer was based in Berlin and attended Hitler's speeches and several party rallies in Nuremberg.

== Reporting the war from Berlin ==
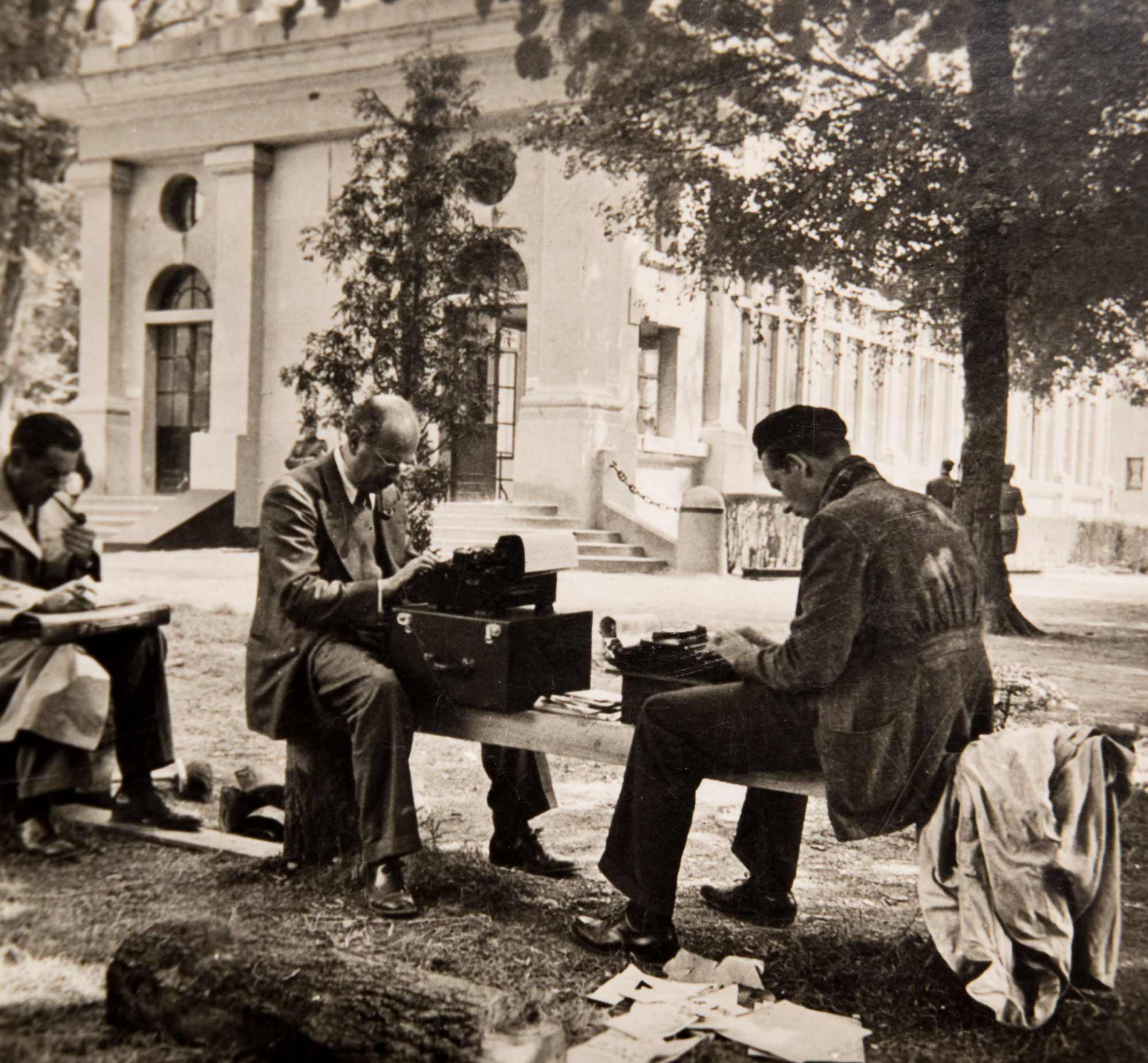
Shirer (center) in Compiègne, France, reporting on the signing of the armistice in June 1940

When war broke out on the Western Front in 1940, Shirer moved forward with the German troops, reporting firsthand on the German "Blitzkrieg". Shirer reported on the invasion of Denmark and Norway in April from Berlin and then on the invasion of the Netherlands, Luxembourg, Belgium, and France in May. As German armies closed in on Paris, he traveled to France with the German forces.

Shirer reported the signing of the German armistice with France on June 22, 1940, to the American people before it had been announced by the Germans. His commentary from Compiègne was hailed as a masterpiece. On the day before the armistice was to be signed, Hitler ordered all foreign correspondents covering the German Army from Paris to move back to Berlin. It was Hitler's intention that the Armistice should be reported to the world by Nazi sources. Shirer avoided being returned to Berlin by leaving the press hotel early in the morning and hitching a ride to Compiègne with a German officer who despised Hitler. Once on site, Shirer was able to give an eye-witness account of that historical moment, "I am but fifty yards from [Hitler]. […] I have seen that face many times at the great moments of his life. But today! It is afire with scorn, anger, hate, revenge, triumph." Then he followed proceedings inside the railway car (as formerly used at the signing of the 1918 armistice which Hitler intended to use to further humiliate France in addition to the recent defeat), listening to the transmission relayed to Berlin through a German army communications truck. After the armistice was signed, Shirer was allowed to transmit his own broadcast to Berlin, but only for recording and release after the Nazi version had been disseminated. Shirer spent five minutes before he went on the air calling CBS radio in New York, hoping that the broadcast would get through. It did. When German engineers in Berlin heard Shirer calling New York, they assumed that he was authorized to broadcast. Instead of sending his report to a recording machine as ordered, they put it on the shortwave transmitter. When CBS heard Shirer's call, transmission was put through live, thus for six hours Shirer's report was the only news the world had of the Armistice.

In peacetime, Shirer's reporting was subject only to self-censorship. He and other reporters in Germany knew that if Nazi officials in Joseph Goebbels' Propaganda Ministry objected to their reporting, they could withdraw access to state-owned broadcasting facilities or expel them from Germany. Shirer was granted more freedom than German reporters writing or broadcasting for domestic audiences. At the beginning of the war, German officials established censorship; Shirer recalled that the restrictions were similar to wartime censorship elsewhere, restricting information that could be used to Germany's military disadvantage.

However, as the war continued and as Britain began to bomb German cities, including Berlin, Nazi censorship became more onerous to Shirer and his colleagues. In contrast to Murrow's live broadcasts of German bombing of London in the Blitz, foreign correspondents in Germany were not allowed to report British air raids on German cities. They were not permitted to cast doubt on statements by the Propaganda Ministry and Military High Command. Reporters were discouraged by the Propaganda Ministry from reporting news or from using terms such as Nazi that might "create an unfavorable impression". Shirer resorted to subtler ways until the censors caught on.

As mid-1940 progressed, the Nazi government pressed Shirer to broadcast official accounts that he knew were incomplete or false. As his frustration grew, he wrote to bosses in New York that tightening censorship was undermining his ability to report objectively and mused that he had outlived his usefulness in Berlin. Shirer was subsequently tipped off that the Gestapo was building an espionage case against him, which carried the death penalty. He began making arrangements to leave Germany, which he did in December 1940.

Shirer smuggled his diaries and notes out of Germany and used them for his Berlin Diary, a firsthand, day-by-day account of events in Nazi Germany during five years of peace and one year of war. It was published in 1941. Historians comparing the original manuscript diary with the published text discovered that Shirer made many changes. Like many others, his early impressions of Hitler had been favourable, and revised later. Much of the text about the pre-1934 to 1938 period was first written long after the war began.

He returned to Europe to report on the Nuremberg trials in 1945.

== Postwar years ==
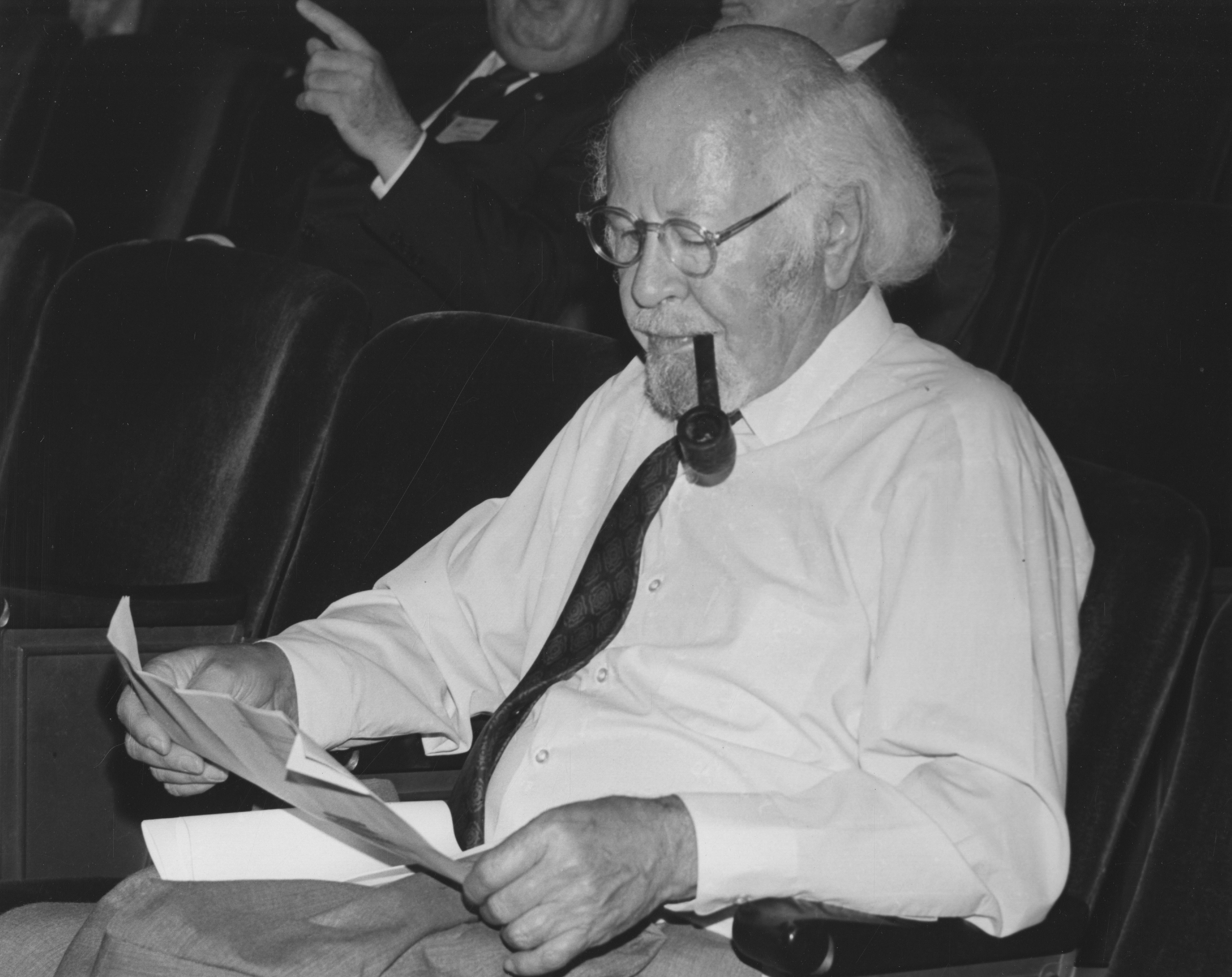
Shirer at the Conference on Research on the Second World War, June 1971

During the war, Shirer became a director of the Society for the Prevention of World War III, which lobbied after the war for a harsh peace with Germany.

Shirer received a 1946 Peabody Award for Outstanding Reporting and Interpretation of News for his work at CBS.

The friendship between Shirer and Murrow ended in 1947, culminating in Shirer's leaving CBS in one of the great confrontations of American broadcast journalism (below).

Shirer briefly provided analysis for the Mutual Broadcasting System and then found himself unable to find regular radio work. He was named in Red Channels (1950), by the right-wing journal Counterattack, which practically barred him from broadcasting and print journalism, and he was forced into lecturing for income. Times remained tough for Shirer, his wife Tess, and daughters Inga and Linda until in 1960 Simon & Schuster published Shirer's best-known work, The Rise and Fall of the Third Reich. In mid-1958, when Shirer was "flat broke" and desperate for funds that would permit him to finish writing, at the recommendation of Hamilton Fish Armstrong, Frank Altschul's Overbrook Foundation advanced Shirer $5,000 ($52,500 in 2024 dollars) and promised another $5,000 six months later, enabling Shirer to finish his monumental tome. In the third volume of his autobiography, Shirer writes: "This saved my life and my book."

The book became a bestseller. The hardback was reprinted 20 times in the first year and sold more than 600,000 copies through the Book of the Month Club edition alone, and one million copies overall. Serialization of a condensed version in Reader's Digest and critical acclaim ensured its success in the US. Fawcett Crest gained paperback rights for $400,000 – a record for the time – and a further 1 million copies were sold at $1.65 (equivalent to $18 in 2025). It won the 1961 National Book Award for Nonfiction and the Carey–Thomas Award for nonfiction.

== Shirer and Murrow ==
The dispute between Shirer and Murrow started in 1947 when J. B. Williams, a maker of shaving soap, withdrew sponsorship of Shirer's Sunday news show. CBS, through Murrow, who was then vice president for public affairs, and CBS head William S. Paley, did not seek another sponsor, moved Shirer's program to Sunday midday and then stopped producing it, all within a month. CBS maintained that Shirer resigned based on a comment made in an impromptu interview, but Shirer said he was essentially forced out: "I had no intention of staying on with CBS so that Paley and Murrow could humiliate me further."

Shirer contended that the root of his troubles was that the network and sponsor did not stand by him because of his on-air comments, such as those critical of the Truman Doctrine, and what he viewed as an emphasis on placating sponsors rather than an emphasis on journalism. He also said that the sponsor (as well as others) had hinted that he was "too liberal" at a time when the Cold War was beginning.

Shirer blamed Murrow for his departure from CBS, referring to Murrow as "Paley's toady". He admitted to being "puzzled" as to why Murrow (and Paley) did not stand by him in this situation. Shirer believed there were possibly several factors: he had turned down an offer from Phil Wrigley (who was the largest single advertiser on CBS at the time) to broadcast in Chicago (which upset Paley), a subtle rivalry between Shirer and Murrow (that Shirer contended he never felt), and the fact Paley and Murrow blamed Shirer for the negative publicity that arose from Shirer's leaving. CBS received thousands of letters and phone calls protesting the end of Shirer's broadcasts. On the Tuesday after the broadcast announcing Shirer's final show would be in a week, picketers appeared in front of the entrance to CBS. The episode hastened Murrow's desire to give up his vice-presidency and return to newscasting. It foreshadowed his misgivings about the future of broadcast journalism and his difficulties with Paley.

The friendship between Shirer and Murrow never recovered. In her preface to This is Berlin, a compilation of Shirer's Berlin broadcasts published after his death, Shirer's daughter Inga describes how Murrow, suffering from lung cancer which he knew could be terminal, tried to heal the breach with Shirer by inviting the Shirers to his farm in 1964. Murrow tried to discuss the breach. Though the two chatted, Shirer steered the conversation away from contentious issues between the two men, and they never had another opportunity to speak before Murrow died in 1965. Shirer's daughter also writes that, shortly before her father's death in 1993, he rebuffed her attempts to learn the source of the breach that opened between the two journalists 45 years earlier. However, in The Nightmare Years (1984), the second volume in Shirer's three-volume memoir, 20th Century Journey, Shirer describes the birth and growth of a warm relationship with Murrow in the 1930s, emphasizing that he and Murrow were close friends as well as colleagues.

== Books ==
=== Nonfiction ===
- 1941: Berlin Diary: The Journal of a Foreign Correspondent, 1934–1941
- 1947: End of a Berlin Diary
- 1955: The Challenge of Scandinavia
- 1960: The Rise and Fall of the Third Reich
- 1961: The Rise and Fall of Adolf Hitler
- 1961: Midcentury Journey: The Western World Through Its Years of Conflict
- 1962: The Sinking of the Bismarck
- 1969: The Collapse of the Third Republic
- 1976: (Autobiography, volume 1) 20th Century Journey: The Start
- 1979: Gandhi: A Memoir
- 1984: (Autobiography, volume 2) 20th Century Journey: The Nightmare Years

- made into a 1989 American television miniseries directed by Anthony Page with Sam Waterston as Shirer

- 1990: (Autobiography, volume 3) 20th Century Journey: A Native's Return
- 1994: Love and Hatred: The Troubled Marriage of Leo and Sonya Tolstoy
- 1999: This is Berlin: Reporting from Nazi Germany, 1938–40

=== Fiction ===
- The Traitor (1950)
- Stranger Come Home (1954)
- The Consul's Wife (1956)

== See also ==
- List of books by or about Adolf Hitler
