= The Collapse of the Third Republic =

1969 book by William L. Shirer

- Cover of the first edition
- Author: William Shirer
- Language: English
- Publisher: Simon & Schuster
- Publication date: 1969
- Publication place: United States
- Media type: Print
- Pages: 1,082
- ISBN: 0671203371

The Collapse of the Third Republic: An Inquiry into the Fall of France in 1940 is a 1969 history book by William L. Shirer which deals with the collapse of the French Third Republic as a result of Hitler's invasion during World War II.

== Prewar ==
As a CBS correspondent in Germany during the climactic events under discussion and as a frequent visitor to and correspondent from prewar France, Shirer was left to question how Germany had overrun France within weeks in 1940. Both countries had fought each other for four years in 1914-1918, with France successfully resisting Germany at every turn of battle along the Western Front during World War I.

Shirer, who knew French, did much of his own research for his 1969 book by speaking with surviving politicians and French leaders from the immediate prewar period as well as those who were on duty during the final catastrophe. His conclusion was that France's defeat had been self-inflicted. Unhealed wounds in its civil society, dating back to the 1890s Dreyfus Affair, had left France's political left and right with unassuageable feelings of resentment towards each other.

The 1930s Great Depression further inflamed the feelings of bitterness. The right, in particular, believed that its country's secular leadership was condemning the country to decadence. A badly-divided France tried to avoid war with Adolf Hitler by participating fully in the negotiations at Munich in 1938, but Hitler forced the issue the following year by his invasion of Poland. World War II had begun.

== Collapse ==
In 1939 and 1940, France faced a united, determined, and technologically-sophisticated enemy. Although it was desperately important for France to match its enemy's traits with determination and unity of its own, French national leaders instead frittered away their final months before the catastrophe in a round of internal hostility, intrigue and backbiting, which led to the restoration of World War I hero Marshal Philippe Pétain as prime minister.

The French media had become thoroughly corrupt. Newspapers, in particular, were bought and paid for by political factions and served as their mouthpieces.

The German Blitzkrieg defeated the French Army and France's will to fight and resist the invaders. After the Second Armistice at Compiègne, many Frenchmen, especially on the right, believed that their country had deserved to lose the war. Key leaders and politicians, led by the aging Pétain and the corrupt, power-hungry Pierre Laval, stepped in and proclaimed their devotion to the survival of France within a Hitlerian New Order for Europe. Overawing the French Parliament, which had fled occupied Paris and was meeting in exile in the resort town of Vichy, they forced their fellow politicians to grant them full powers to control the remainder of unoccupied France for the remainder of the war.

The Third Republic could not survive that disgrace. After the regime of the Pétainist French State (État français) and the liberation by the Allies, French officials did not restore the former constitution but quickly wrote a new constitution. Its ratification, in October 1946, paved the way for the French Fourth Republic.
