= 34th Palm Springs International Film Festival =

2023 film festival

- Opening film: 80 for Brady
- Closing film: The Lost King
- Location: Palm Springs, California, United States
- Festival date: January 5–16, 2023

Palm Springs International Film Festival
- 2024 2022

The 34th Palm Springs International Film Festival took place from January 5 to 16, 2023, in Palm Springs, California, United States. The festival opened with the world premiere of Kyle Marvin's comedy film 80 for Brady and closed with Stephen Frears' biographical film The Lost King.

== Background and special awards ==
Throughout December 2022, several special awards were announced, which were presented at the Opening Gala on January 5, 2023, at the Palm Springs Convention Center. Actors Austin Butler and Danielle Deadwyler were honored with the Breakthrough Performance Award, for their performances in Elvis and for Till, respectively. Steven Spielberg's The Fabelmans received the Vanguard Award, Brendan Fraser received the Spotlight Award, Sarah Polley received the Director of the Year award for Women Talking and Viola Davis received the chairman's Award. Desert Palm Achievement Awards were presented to Cate Blanchett for Tár and Colin Farrell for The Banshees of Inisherin, while Michelle Yeoh and Bill Nighy received the International Star Actress and International Star Actor awards respectively.

The following day, on January 6, the Variety's 10 Directors to Watch brunch took place at the Parker Palm Springs, where four Creative Impact awards were presented: Creative Impact in Acting Award to Angela Bassett; Creative Impact in Screenwriting Award to Rian Johnson; Creative Impact in Directing Award to Baz Luhrmann; and Creative Impact in Breakthrough Performance Award to Brian Tyree Henry for Causeway.

== Juries ==
The juries consists of the following members:

=== FIPRESCI International Film Jury ===
- Robert Horton, historian and programmer at Scarecrow Video Project and member of the National Society of Film Critics.
- Andrew Kendall, Head of the Department of Language and Cultural Studies at the University of Guyana.
- Anders Larsson, Swedish critic, poet and festival director of Lund Fantastic Film Festival

=== Ibero-American Jury ===
- Manuel Betancourt, Colombian culture writer.
- Trey Shields, programmer of the Philadelphia Film Society and Philadelphia Film Festival.
- Rebecca Sun, senior editor of diversity and inclusion at The Hollywood Reporter.

=== Documentary Jury ===
- Diana Cadavid, Colombian-Canadian film curator and International Programmer for the Toronto International Film Festival.
- Amir George, American filmmaker.
- Robin Robinson, Senior Programmer at the Hot Springs Documentary Film Festival.

=== New Voices New Visions ===
- Violet Lucca, web editor and digital director at Harper's Magazine.
- Monica Trasandes, Uruguayan-American director of Spanish-Language & Latinx Media & Representation at GLAAD.
- Lauren Wissot, film critic, journalist, filmmaker and programmer.

=== Bridging the Borders ===
- Keely Badger, Executive Director of MOZAIK.
- Bambadjan Bamba, actor, filmmaker and immigrant rights advocate.
- Marcy Garriott, independent documentary filmmaker.
- Vladek Juszkiewicz, founder of the Polish Film Festival Los Angeles.
- Granaz Moussavi, Iranian writer and literary critic
- Bijan Tehrani, founder and director of I, Immigrant and founder of Cinema Without Borders (CWB) and CineEqual.

== Sections ==
The films selected for each section are as follows:

=== Awards Buzz – Best International Feature Film Submissions ===
The following section consists of submissions for Best International Feature Film at the 95th Academy Awards:

English title	Original title	Director(s)	Production countrie(s)
Ajoomma	花路阿朱妈	He Shuming	Singapore
Alcarràs		Carla Simón	Spain
All Quiet on the Western Front	Im Westen nichts Neues	Edward Berger	Germany
Argentina, 1985		Santiago Mitre	Argentina
Bardo, False Chronicle of a Handful of Truths	Bardo, falsa crónica de unas cuantas verdades	Alejandro G. Iñárritu	Mexico
Beautiful Beings	Berdreymi	Guðmundur Arnar Guðmundsson	Iceland
Blanquita		Fernando Guzzoni	Chile
Boy from Heaven	صبي من الجنة	Tarik Saleh	Sweden
Cinema Sabaya (Note: Nominated for the MOZAIK Bridging the Borders Award.)	סינמה סבאיא	Orit Fouks Rotem	Israel
Close		Lukas Dhont	Belgium
Corsage		Marie Kreutzer	Austria
Darkling	Мрак	Dušan Milić	Serbia
Decision to Leave	헤어질 결심	Park Chan-wook	South Korea
EO	IO	Jerzy Skolimowski	Poland
Eternal Spring	长春	Jason Loftus	Canada
Holy Spider	عنکبوت مقدس	Ali Abbasi	Denmark
Il Boemo		Petr Václav	Czech Republic
Joyland	جوائے لینڈ	Saim Sadiq	Pakistan
Kalev		Ove Musting	Estonia
Klondike	Клондайк	Maryna Er Gorbach	Ukraine
Last Film Show		Pan Nalin	India
Mars One	Marte Um	Gabriel Martins	Brazil
Mediterranean Fever		Maha Haj	Palestine
Nostalgia		Mario Martone	Italy
Return to Seoul	Retour à Séoul	Davy Chou	Cambodia
Saint Omer		Alice Diop	France
The Blue Caftan	أزرق القفطان	Maryam Touzani	Morocco
The Happiest Man in the World	Najsreḱniot Čovek na Svetot	Teona Strugar Mitevska	North Macedonia
The Quiet Girl	An Cailín Ciúin	Colm Bairéad	Ireland
Under the Fig Trees	تحت الشجرة	Erige Sehiri	Tunisia
Utama		Alejandro Loayza Grisi	Bolivia
Victim	Oběť	Michal Blaško	Slovakia
War Sailor	Krigsseileren	Gunnar Vikene	Norway
World War III	جنگ جهانی سوم	Houman Seyyedi	Iran
You Won't Be Alone		Goran Stolevski	Australia

Highlighted title indicates the section winner.

=== Talking Pictures ===
The following films were selected to be screened as part of the Talking Pictures section, each with discussion panels with their directors, writers and actors:

English title	Original title	Director(s)	Production countrie(s)
Alice, Darling		Mary Nighy	United States, Canada
Chevalier		Stephen Williams	United States
The Banshees of Inisherin		Martin McDonagh	Ireland, United Kingdom, United States
Moving On		Paul Weitz	United States

=== Modern Masters ===
The following films were selected to be screened as part of the Modern Masters section, consisting of new films by well-established directors:

English title	Original title	Director(s)	Production countrie(s)
All the Beauty and the Bloodshed		Laura Poitras	United States
Broker	브로커	Hirokazu Kore-eda	South Korea
A Compassionate Spy		Steve James	United States, United Kingdom
Hilma		Lasse Hallström	Sweden
No Bears	خرس نیست	Jafar Panahi	Iran
One Fine Morning	Un beau matin	Mia Hansen-Løve	France, United Kingdom, Germany
R.M.N.		Cristian Mungiu	Romania, France, Belgium, Sweden
Salvatore: Shoemaker of Dreams		Luca Guadagnino	Italy
Tori and Lokita	Tori et Lokita	Dardenne brothers	Belgium. France

=== New Voices New Visions ===
The following films were selected to be screened as part of the New Voices New Visions section:

English title	Original title	Director(s)	Production countrie(s)
Aristotle and Dante Discover the Secrets of the Universe		Aitch Alberto	United States
Butterfly Vision	Бачення метелика	Maksim Nakonechnyi	Croatia, Czech Republic, Sweden, Ukraine
The Damned Don't Cry	Les damnés ne pleurent pas	Fyzal Boulifa	France, Belgium, Morocco
How to Blow Up a Pipeline		Daniel Goldhaber	United States
Love According to Dalva	Dalva	Emmanuelle Nicot	Belgium, France
Our Father, the Devil		Ellie Foumbi	United States
Riceboy Sleeps (Note: Nominated for the Young Cineasted Award.)		Anthony Shim	Canada
Snow and the Bear	Kar ve Ayı	Selcen Ergun	Turkey, Germany, Serbia
Susie Searches		Sophie Kargman	United States, United Kingdom

Highlighted title indicates the section winner.

=== True Stories ===
The following films were selected to be screened as part of the True Stories section:

English title	Original title	Director(s)	Production countrie(s)
1341 Frames of Love and War	1341 Framim Mehamatzlema Shel Micha Bar-Am	Ran Tal	Israel
All That Breathes (Note: Nominated for the Local Jury Award)		Shaunak Sen	India, United Kingdom
Anxious Nation		Vanessa Roth, Laura Morton	United States
The Art of Eating: The Life of M.F.K. Fisher		Gregory M. Bezat	United States
Bella		Bridget Murnane	United States
Body Parts		Kristy Guevara-Flanagan, Helen Hood Scheer	United States
Born in Chicago		Bob Sarles, John Anderson	United States
Butterfly in the Sky		Bradford Thomason, Brett Whitcomb	United States
The Caviar Connection	La Caviar Connection	Benoît Bringer	France
Crows Are White		Ahsen Nadeem	Japan, Ireland, United States
Desperate Souls, Dark City and the Legend of Midnight Cowboy		Nancy Buirski	United States
The Grab		Gabriela Cowperthwaite	United States
I Like It Here		Ralph Arlyck	United States
Lakota Nation vs. United States		Jesse Short Bull, Laura Tomaselli	United States
Lift		David Petersen	United States
Liquor Store Dreams		So Yun Um	United States
Of Medicine and Miracles		Ross Kauffman	United States
Roberta		Antonino D'Ambrosio	United States
Shot in the Arm		Scott Hamilton Kennedy	United States
Split at the Root		Linda Goldstein Knowlton	United States
Subject		Camilla Hall, Jennifer Tiexiera	United States
The Thief Collector		Allison Otto	United States
To Kill a Tiger		Nisha Pahuja	Canada
Turn Every Page: The Adventures of Robert Caro and Robert Gottlieb		Lizzie Gottlieb	United States

Highlighted title indicates the section winner.

=== Cine Latino ===
The following films were selected to be screened as part of the Cine Latino section:

English title	Original title	Director(s)	Production countrie(s)
1976		Manuela Martelli	Chile, United States
Huesera: The Bone Woman	Huesera	Michelle Garza Cervera	Mexico, Peru
I Have Electric Dreams	Tengo sueños eléctricos	Valentina Maurel	Costa Rica, Belgium, France
Sublime		Mariano Biasin	Argentina
The Substitute	El suplente	Diego Lerman	Argentina, Italy, France, Spain, Mexico

Highlighted title indicates the section winner.

=== Queer Cinema Today & The Gayla ===
The following films were selected to be screened as part of the Queer Cinema Today section and The Gayla:

English title	Original title	Director(s)	Production countrie(s)
1946: The Mistranslation that Shifted Culture		Sharon "Rocky" Roggio	United States, Canada
Casa Susanna		Sebastien Lifshitz	United States
Eismayer		David Wagner	Austria
Esther Newton Made Me Gay		Jean Carlomusto	United States
God Save the Queens		Jordan Danger	United States
Mama Bears		Daresha Kyi	United States
My Emptiness and I	Mi vacío y yo	Adrián Silvestre	Spain
Nelly & Nadine		Magnus Gertten	Sweden, Belgium, Norway
Punch		Welby Ings	New Zealand, United States
Winter Boy	Le Lycéen	Christophe Honoré	France
You Can Live Forever		Mark Slutsky, Sarah Watts	Canada

=== World Cinema Now ===
The following films were selected to be screened as part of the World Cinema Now section:

English title	Original title	Director(s)	Production countrie(s)
Back Then	Zupa nic	Kinga Dębska	Poland
Before, Now & Then	Nana	Kamila Andini	Indonesia
Burning Days	Kurak Günler	Emin Alper	Turkey, France, Germany, Netherlands, Greece, Croatia
Concerned Citizen		Idan Haguel	Israel, United States
Dirty, Difficult, Dangerous		Wissam Charaf	France, Italy, Lebanon, Saudi Arabia, Qatar
Driving Madeleine	Une belle course	Christian Carion	France
Emily	Frances O'Connor	United States	
Freaks Out		Gabriele Mainetti	Italy, Belgium
Golden Years	Die goldenen Jahre	Barbara Kulcsar	Switzerland
Greener Pastures		Matan Guggenheim, Assaf Abiri	Israel
Gyeong-ah's Daughter	경아의 딸	Kim Jung-eun	South Korea
Haute Couture		Sylvia Ohayon	France
Juniper		Matthew J. Saville	New Zealand
Linoleum		Colin West	United States
Lullaby	Cinco lobitos	Alauda Ruiz de Azúa	Spain
Max, Min & Meowzaki		N Padmakumar	United States
Melchior the Apothecary	Apteeker Melchior	Elmo Nüganen	Estonia, Latvia, Lithuania, Germany
My Neighbor Adolf		Leonid Prudovsky	Israel, Colombia, Poland
My Sailor, My Love	Rakkaani merikapteeni	Klaus Härö	Finland, Ireland
Next Sohee	다음 소희	July Jung	South Korea
Paris Memories	Revoir Paris	Alice Winocour	France
Simone Veil, A Woman of the Century	Simone, le voyage du siècle	Olivier Dahan	France
Somewhere in Queens		Ray Romano	United States
Stonewalling	石门	Huang Ji, Ryuji Otsuka	Japan
Talia's Journey		Christophe Rolin	Belgium, Senegal, Luxembourg
The Beasts	As bestas	Rodrigo Sorogoyen	Spain, France
The Judgement	De veroordeling	Sander Burger	Netherlands, Germany
The Origin of Evil	L'Origine du mal	Sébastien Marnier	France, Canada
The Storyteller		Anant Narayan Mahadevan	India
The Word	Slovo	Beata Parkanová	Czech Republic, Slovakia, Poland
Viking		Stéphane Lafleur	Canada
Where Life Begins	Alla vita	Stéphane Freiss	Italy
Without Her	بی رویا	Arian Vazirdaftari	Iran, Germany

=== Local Spotlight ===
The following films were selected to be screened as part of the Local Spotlight section:

English title	Original title	Director(s)	Production countrie(s)
Don't Worry Darling		Olivia Wilde	United States
Racist Trees		Sara Newens, Mina T. Son	United States

== Awards ==
The following awards were presented at the 34th Edition:

=== International Film competition ===
- Best International Feature Film: Saint Omer
- Best Actor in an International Feature Film: Ali Junejo for Joyland
- Best Actress in an International Feature Film: Oksana Cherkashina for Klondike
- Best International Screenplay: Arnau Vilaró and Carla Simón for Alcarràs

=== Ibero-American Competition ===
- Ibero-American Award: 1976 by Manuela Martelli
- Ibero-American Special Mention: Blanquita by Fernando Guzzoni

=== Documentary competition ===
- Best Documentary: To Kill a Tiger by Nisha Pahuja
- Special Mention: Butterfly in the Sky by Bradford Thomason, Brett Whitcomb

=== New Voices New Visions ===
- New Voices New Visions Award: The Damned Don't Cry by Fyzal Boulifa
- New Voices New Visions Special Mention: Our Father, the Devil by Ellie Foumbi

=== Local Jury ===
- Local Jury Award: Liquor Store Dreams by So Yun Um
- Local Jury Special Mention: Mama Bears by Daresha Kyi

=== Other awards ===
- Young Cineastes Award: Riceboy Sleeps by Anthony Shim
- MOZAIK Bridging the Borders Award: Dirty, Difficult, Dangerous by Wissam Charaf
  - Special Mention: The Happiest Man in the World by Teona Strugar Mitevska
