= Down to the Countryside Movement =

1950s Chinese policy of moving urban youth

- Some of the 200,000 sent-down youth from Shenyang (1968)
- Traditional Chinese: 上山下鄉運動
- Simplified Chinese: 上山下乡运动
- Literal meaning: The Up to the Mountains & Down to the Villages Movement
Transcriptions
Standard Mandarin
- Hanyu Pinyin: Shàngshān Xiàxiāng Yùndòng
- Wade–Giles: Shang^{4}-shan^{1} Hsia^{4}-hsiang^{1} Yün^{4}-tung^{4}
- IPA: [ʂâŋʂán ɕjâɕjáŋ ŷntʊ̂ŋ]
Yue: Cantonese
- Jyutping: Soeng^{5}-saan^{1} Haa^{6}-hoeng^{1} Wan^{6}-dung^{6}

Resettlement
- Traditional Chinese: 插隊落戶
- Simplified Chinese: 插队落户
- Literal meaning: join the [production] team, settle down [in the communes]
Transcriptions
Standard Mandarin
- Hanyu Pinyin: chāduì luòhù

The Up to the Mountains and Down to the Countryside Movement, often known simply as the Down to the Countryside Movement, was a policy instituted in the People's Republic of China between the mid-1950s and 1978. As a result of what he perceived to be pro-bourgeois thinking prevalent during the Cultural Revolution, Chairman Mao Zedong declared certain privileged urban youth would be sent to mountainous areas or farming villages to learn from the workers and farmers there. In total, approximately 17 million youth were sent to rural areas as a result of the movement. Usually only the oldest child had to go, but younger siblings could volunteer to go instead.

Chairman Mao's policy differed from Chinese president Liu Shaoqi's early 1960s sending-down policy in its political context. President Liu instituted the first sending-down policy to redistribute excess urban population following the Great Chinese Famine and the Great Leap Forward. Mao's stated aim for the policy was to ensure that urban students could "develop their talents to the full" through education amongst the rural population.

Many fresh high school graduates, who became known as the so-called sent-down youth (also known in China as "educated youth" and abroad as "rusticated youth"), were forced out of the cities and effectively exiled to remote areas of China. Some commentators consider these people, many of whom lost the opportunity to attend university, "China's Lost Generation". Famous authors who have written about their experiences during the movement include Nobel laureate Liu Xiaobo, Jiang Rong, Ma Bo and Zhang Chengzhi, all of whom went to Inner Mongolia. Dai Sijie's Balzac and the Little Chinese Seamstress has received great praise for its take on life for the young people sent to rural villages of China during the movement (see scar literature). CCP general secretary Xi Jinping was also among the youth sent to rural areas. Xi was a send-down youth for seven years until he enrolled in Tsinghua University's chemical engineer program in 1975.

In 1978, the government ended the movement, but the sent-down youth were not allowed to return to their homes in urban areas, with exception of those who enrolled in university through Gaokao and some whose parents or relatives were high-level officials. After a huge wave of protests across the country by the sent-down youth especially in Xishuangbanna, the State Council eventually allowed the sent-down youths to return to urban areas in early 1979.

Resettlement in the countryside (chāduì luòhù) was a more permanent form.

== Background ==
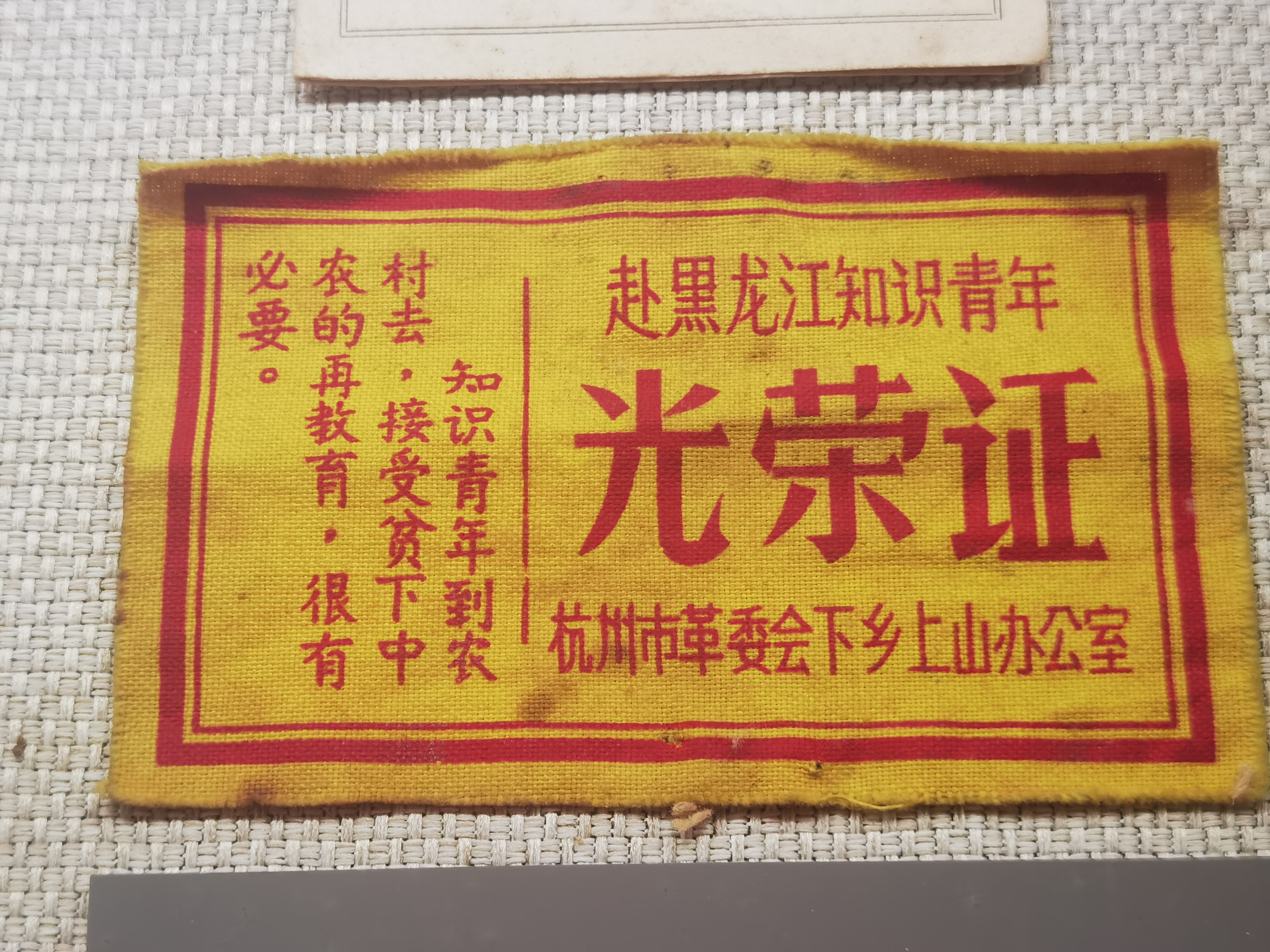
Certificate in honor of Down to the Countryside Movement

The Great Leap Forward campaign's aim was to increase agriculture, industrial productions, social change and ideological change. The Great Leap's goal of developing China's material productive forces was inextricably intertwined with the pursuit of communist social goals and the development of a popular communist consciousness. This failed and could have ended Mao Zedong's influence. Instead of moving forward into a more modern country, Mao and the CCP took a step back to the past. Harsh weather and gross economic mismanagement resulted in the worst famine in history. Mao's position with the party was weakened, so he worked on a plan that would be his defining moment and would give the Chinese a national identity. From here, he plotted his return to the pinnacle of power, which resulted in the Cultural Revolution.

The Cultural Revolution did bring important changes in the social character and political climate of life in China but not so much in its formal institutions. Mao's power base was paramount. The revolution aimed to bring new social change in the 1960s and early years of the decade. The changes were important, nevertheless, vitally affecting the lives of the vast majority of the Chinese people.

The Cultural Revolution consisted of many different smaller sub-campaigns that affected all of China, some of which came about quite quickly. One of these campaigns was the Monsters and Demons campaign that ran from 1966 to 1967. The campaign's name refers to metaphors such as "cow demons and snake spirits" that were used to demonize one's political opponent during the Cultural Revolution. Once someone was labeled as a "cow demon", they were to become imprisoned in a cowshed, storehouse or dark room. The country ended up in complete chaos once the Red Guards entered the picture. Therefore, the images displayed on posters showed a clear idea of what behavior and slogans were acceptable during this movement. From 1966 to 1968, all schools in China were closed, and the college entrance exams cancelled. Secondary and primary school students had the option to still go if they wished, which many did because they were curious as to what was going on. Schools were used as a rallying ground to interrogate those who were considered to be class enemies, such as teachers.

The Cultural Revolution started with Mao reaching out to high school students for ideological and material support. They were asked to target teachers viewed as possessing or propagating capitalist views and rebelling against them, which many were open to due to high academic pressure. During that time, the Red Guards participated in parades, mass meetings, and propagation and distribution of the Little Red Book. At this point, the politics initiated by Mao's government, along with the diminishing crops, had left the country in dire financial straits.

On 22 December 1968, People's Daily published Mao's instructions that "urban youth should go to the villages to be reeducated by poor peasants." From December 1968 onward, millions of educated urban youth, consisting of secondary school graduates and students, were mobilized and sent "up to the mountains and down to the villages" i.e. to rural villages and to frontier settlements. In these areas, they had to build up and take root, to receive reeducation from the poor and lower-middle peasants. Many youths joined the movement enthusiastically; many only joined because they were required to.

Ten percent of the 1970 urban population was relocated. The population grew from 500 million to 700 million people in China. One way for Mao to handle the population growth was to send people to the countryside. From an ideological perspective, Mao believed many urban young people were adversely affected by material comfort in the cities, and that working in the countryside would help them embrace a role as successors to China's revolution and to embrace the virtues of the peasantry. This was a way for high school students to better integrate themselves into the working class. "In the beginning, the Cultural Revolution exhilarated me because suddenly I felt that I was allowed to think with my own head and say what was on my mind". The movement also sought to alleviate urban rural unemployment among the youth, which had increased as urban populations did.

Among the major genres of literature during the Cultural Revolution were novels about the experiences of sent-down youth. These included novels written by sent-down youths themselves, such as Zhang Kangkang's 1975 novel Dividing Line and Zhang Changgong's 1973 novel Youth.

== See also ==
- New Economic Zones program
- Reform through labor
- School in the countryside
- Back to the Village National Campaign

== General references ==
- Schoppa, R. Keith (2006), Revolution and Its Past: Identities and Change in Modern Chinese History, Pearson Education, pp. 349–356, ISBN 0-13-193039-7
- Benson, Linda (2002), China Since 1949, Semnar Studies in History, Pearson Education, pp. 38–44, ISBN 0-582-43739-3
- Zhong, Xueping; et al. (2001), Some of Us: Chinese Women Growing Up in the Mao Era, Rutgers University Press, ISBN 0-8135-2969-7
- Ebrey, Patricia Buckley (2005). China: A Cultural, Social, and Political History (1st ed.). Wadsworth Publishing. p. 294. ISBN 978-0618133871.
- Hille, Kathrin (September 20, 2013). "China's 'sent-down' youth". Financial Times. Archived from the original on December 12, 2022.
- Dietrich, Craig (1997). People's China: A Brief History (3rd ed.). Oxford University Press. p. 199. ISBN 978-0195106299.
- McLaren, Anne (July 1979). "The Educated Youth Return: The Poster Campaign in Shanghai from November 1978 to March 1979". The Australian Journal of Chinese Affairs. 2 (2): 1–20. doi:10.2307/2158728. ISSN 0156-7365. JSTOR 2158728. S2CID 131104421.
- Thornber, Karen Laura (2012). Ecoambiguity: Environmental Crises and East Asian Literatures (e-book). Ann Arbor, MI: University of Michigan Press. p. 147. doi:10.3998/mpub.3867115. hdl:2027/fulcrum.qn59q491p. ISBN 978-0-472-11806-9. "Some were sent to rural villages to join production teams and establish residence (chadui luohu). These individuals did not significantly change environments."
- Meisner, Maurice J. (1977). Mao's China (1st ed.). New York: A Division of Macmillan Publishing.
- Mitter, Rana (2008). Modern China An Illustrated History. Oxford, New York: Oxford University Press. p. 60.
- Lu, Xing (2004). Rhetoric of the Chinese Cultural Revolution: The Impact on Chinese Thought, Culture, and Communication. Columbia, S.C.: University of South Carolina Press. pp. 59–61. ISBN 978-1-57003-543-2. OCLC 54374711.
- Li, Gucheng (January 1, 1995). A Glossary of Political Terms of the People's Republic of China. Chinese University Press. pp. 427–428. ISBN 9789622016156.
- Yang, Rae (2013). Spider Eaters: A Memoir. University of California Press. ISBN 9780520276024.
- Landsberger, Stefan R; van der Heijden, Marien, eds. (September 2007). "Up to the mountains, down to the villages (1968)". Chinese Posters Foundation.
