= 1341 Frames of Love and War =

2022 Israeli documentary drama film directed by Ran Tal

- German: 1341 Framim Mehamatzlema Shel Micha Bar-Am
- Directed by: Ran Tal
- Produced by: Ran Tal; Sarig Peker
- Starring: Micha Bar-Am; Orna Bar-Am
- Edited by: Nilli Feller
- Production company: Grapevine Shoot Productions
- Distributed by: Reservoir Docs
- Release date: 13 February 2022 (Berlinale)
- Running time: 136 minutes
- Countries: Israel; UK; USA
- Languages: Hebrew; German

1341 Frames of Love and War (German: 1341 Framim Mehamatzlema Shel Micha Bar-Am) is a 2022 Israeli-German documentary drama film written and directed by Ran Tal. The film uses only archival images taken by German-born Israeli photographer Micha Bar-Am to illustrate both events in his life and events surrounding and involving Israel during his lifetime. It premiered in the Special section at the 72nd Berlin International Film Festival on 13 February 2022.

== Synopsis ==
The documentary gives insight into the images captured by Micha Bar-Am during his 50-year career. As he reviews his archive of over half a million photographic negatives of war-related images, he questions and doubts himself in an exploration of photography, memory, and the personal cost of a life devoted to recording conflict.

== Production ==
Orna, Micha Bar-Am's wife, was responsible for archiving her husband's images for inclusion in exhibitions and catalogs. That role was vital in preserving them to be presented in this film. She also participates in the interviews in this film. YES Docu, Makor Fund, Mifaal HaPaiis, Jewish Film Institute (San Francisco) and The Other Israel (New York) provided received support and backing for the film project .

== Distribution rights ==
Reservoir Docs sold the distribution rights and international sales of the film to seven territories excluding North America, Israel, Greece, Portugal, Non Stop (Nordic), Tanweer Films (Greece) and Nos Lusomundo Audiovisuais (Portugal).

== Release ==
The film was released in Israel on 23 June 2022, and was screened at several international film festivals. The film was premiered at following film festivals.

=== 2022 ===
- Telluride Film Festival

Berlin Film Festival

- Kraków Film Festival
- Sheffield DocFest
- Jewish Film Festival Berlin
- Rhodope Documentary Film
- Jewish International Film Festival Australia
- Athens International Film festival
- Cork International Film Festival
- Festival of Tolerance
- International Film Festival of Kerala
- Vancouver International Film Festival
- Ambulante Documentary Film Festival
- Morelia International Film Festival
- Warsaw Jewish Film Festival
- Free Zone Film Festival
- UK Jewish Film Festival
- Warsaw Jewish Film Festival.

== Accolades ==
The film won three awards at the 2022 DocAviv Festival. The director of the film Ran Tal received the Best Director award while editor of the film Nilli Feller was adjudged as the Best Editor during 2022 DocAviv. The film also won Kedar Foundation Award especially for narrating storyline inspired from Israeli history and society while also collected cash prize of $15000 during DocAviv.
