= Woman-Ochre =

1955 painting by Willem de Kooning

- Artist: Willem de Kooning
- Year: 1955
- Completion date: 1955
- Medium: Oil on canvas
- Movement: Abstract expressionism
- Subject: Stylized representation of a female figure
- Dimensions: 76 cm × 100 cm (30 in × 40 in)
- Condition: Restored after being damaged by thieves
- Location: University of Arizona Museum of Art, Tucson, Arizona, U.S.
- Owner: University of Arizona
- Accession: 1958.002.015

Woman-Ochre is a 1955 abstract expressionist oil painting by Dutch-American artist Willem de Kooning, part of his Woman series from that period. It was controversial in its day, like the other paintings in the series, for its explicit use of figures, which Jackson Pollock and other abstract expressionists considered a betrayal of the movement's ideal of pure, non-representational painting. Feminists also considered the works misogynistic, suggesting violent impulses toward the women depicted.

Several years after it was completed, a wealthy collector from the Eastern United States bought it and later donated it to the new University of Arizona Museum of Art (UAMA) in Tucson, where he frequently vacationed, with the stipulation that the museum could not ever sell or give it away, even as the value of other de Kooning paintings from that era rose to over US$100 million in the early 21st century; however the stipulation did not prevent the museum from loaning it to traveling exhibits, and it went with several, as far away as Eastern Europe.

In 1985 it was stolen from the museum. Investigators believed the thieves were a couple who had visited the museum briefly on the day after Thanksgiving Day that year, as it was found to have been cut from its frame shortly after they left. Sketches were circulated in an effort to identify them, but no leads turned up until it was recovered 32 years later after it was offered for sale at a New Mexico antique store, where it had been part of the estate of Jerry and Rita Alter, two former New York City public school teachers who had retired to the area. Visitors to the store speculated that the work was a de Kooning, and then the proprietor found a picture of the missing painting on the Internet. He contacted museum staff, who were able to provisionally authenticate it, and it was returned to Tucson. The museum did not put it back on exhibit, except for one day before sending it to the Getty Conservation Institute in Los Angeles, and raised funds to restore and repair it. After delays resulting from the COVID-19 pandemic, it was finished in 2022.

It has not been determined who stole the painting. Suspicion has fallen on the Alters, who were photographed at a family Thanksgiving dinner in Tucson the night before the theft, and displayed it in their house in a manner that only they were likely to have seen during their lifetimes. They also did bear a slight resemblance to the couple in the sketches, and Jerome Alter later wrote a book of stories in which two characters carry out a similar theft of a museum piece to reserve for their own exclusive enjoyment. The living relatives of the Alters believe it is possible that they bought the painting from a third party, entirely unaware of its provenance. A 2022 documentary about the crime and the Alters implicated them in the theft of two other paintings, which have also been located and returned to the museum they were stolen from.

== History ==
De Kooning started Woman-Ochre, an extension of his earlier Woman series, in 1954 while living in the Manhattan neighborhood of Greenwich Village along with other artists and intellectuals of the New York School. He finished it the following year.

Like the other paintings in the series, it depicted a female figure, recognizable albeit highly stylized into abstract shapes. They were controversial both among de Kooning's fellow artists and critics. The former, especially Jackson Pollock, felt the artist had been unable to sustain abstract expressionism's goal of pure painting by resorting to what was still recognizably figurative art. John Elderfield, who curated a 2011-2012 de Kooning retrospective at the Museum of Modern Art in New York, says that the series' power stems from its use of the thick brushes and broad strokes associated with Venetian painting juxtaposed with its subject matter: "He was using traditional techniques to make alarmingly modern paintings, and I think this hybrid quality made people uncomfortable."

From outside the arts community, critic Emily Genauer attacked the works from a feminist perspective, calling them misogynistic depictions of women being tortured. De Kooning's comments on the paintings did not allay that criticism. "Women irritate me sometimes", he said. "I painted that irritation in the 'Woman' series." His wife Elaine said her mother-in-law, not she, was the inspiration.

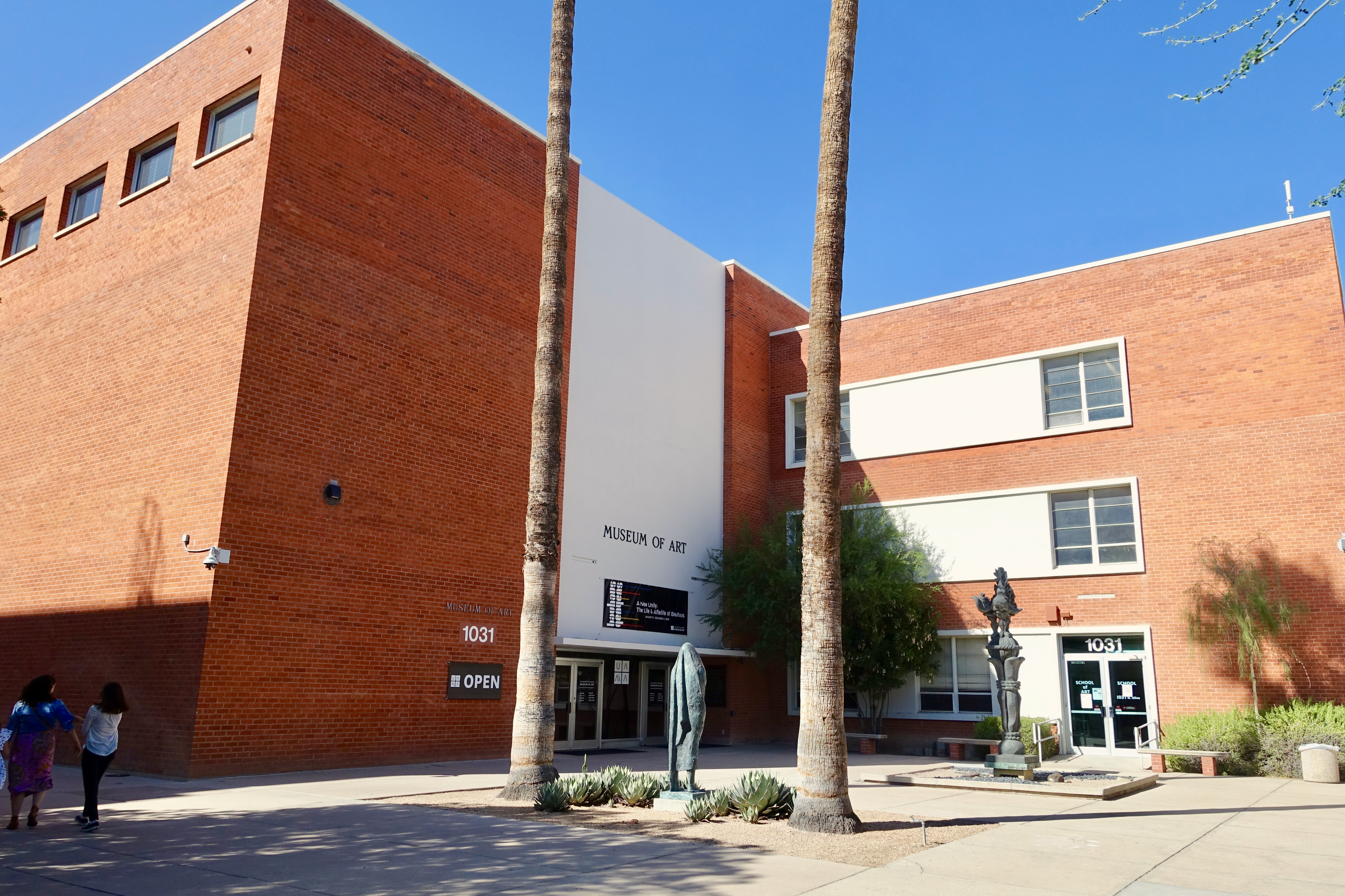
University of Arizona Art Museum, in 2019

After de Kooning completed Woman-Ochre in 1955, it was displayed at the Martha Jackson Gallery in New York for two years, part of a one-man show of 21 works, mostly oils but with a few sketches, only two of them abstract. Edward Joseph Gallagher Jr., an architect and collector from Baltimore, bought it in 1957. Another pastime of his was vacationing at dude ranches in Arizona. The following year, after reading an article in Life about the University of Arizona's new art museum and its collection of Renaissance art, Gallagher called the university's president and offered to donate some of his modern paintings to the museum in honor of his son, who had recently died in a boating accident. Ultimately, he gave UAMA 200 works including Woman-Ochre, many of which were by de Kooning and other abstract expressionist painters such as Pollock and Mark Rothko. His gift came with the stipulation that the museum could never sell or give the paintings, including Woman-Ochre, to anyone else.

During the 1960s, the museum loaned it to several exhibitions elsewhere. It was displayed at the Cantonal Museum of Fine Arts in Lausanne, Switzerland in 1963, and then at several colleges in New England over the next two years. The Museum of Modern Art (MoMA) included it in one of its own traveling exhibitions, Two Decades of American Painting, during 1966 and 1967. A 1969 Smithsonian exhibit, The Disappearance and Reappearance of the Image, introduced the painting to museumgoers in several Eastern European countries, Paris and Brussels.

Woman-Ochre largely remained in Arizona after that. It was loaned to another MoMA traveling exhibit, Four Contemporary Masters, in 1975. For two weeks at the end of August 1981, it was displayed at the Guild Hall of East Hampton, New York, which had exhibited many of de Kooning's other works and helped popularize him.

=== Theft ===
On November 29, 1985, the day after Thanksgiving, an older woman and younger man, wearing heavy winter coats against the 13 °C (55 °F) late November chill, were waiting outside the museum shortly before its 9 a.m. opening time. When security guards let a staff member in, the couple followed. The guards decided to let them in anyway.

The couple went upstairs. Midway up the stairs, the woman began asking the guard on duty about some of the artwork in the museum, while the man continued upstairs. Shortly afterwards, he returned and the two left.

This very short visit to the museum seemed unusual to the guard, and he went upstairs to see if anything was amiss. He found that Woman-Ochre had been cut from its frame. (Note: For a video made for the Getty Museum's post-restoration exhibit of the painting, senior conservator Ulrich Birkmaier re-enacted the removal of the painting from its frame, using a life-size photographic copy and a box cutter. "To go at it with a knife was upsetting", he recalled. "It went against everything we are trained to do.") It appeared that the man had hidden the painting under his coat before leaving. A witness later recalled seeing the two drive off in a rust-colored two-door sports car.

No fingerprints were found at the scene. At the time the museum had no security cameras, so investigators had to rely on eyewitness accounts which described the man as in his late 20s, with dark brown hair, glasses and a mustache, wearing sunglasses and a dark blue water-repellent coat with a hood; the woman was said to be older, with a scarf and granny glasses, reddish-blonde hair, wearing a red water-repellent coat and tan bell-bottoms. Sketches were made and distributed to the public. The university's police department turned the case over to the Federal Bureau of Investigation, but no leads materialized.

The museum's insurance company paid US$400,000 ($1.02 million in 2025), the painting's estimated market value at the time, on the claim. It used the money to buy security cameras; the museum also revised its schedule to stay closed on the day after Thanksgiving in the future. Like many other art museums that have suffered thefts of works on display, it did not replace Woman-Ochre, instead placing a blank ochre-colored canvas on the wall behind the frame, where the cut fibers were still visible, to call attention to the loss. By 2015, when another 1955 de Kooning, Interchange, was sold for US$300 million, making it the most expensive painting ever at that time, the museum estimated the value of the still-missing work at US$160 million. (Note: After its recovery, the museum said it had no plans to sell it. Art advisor Allan Schwartzman told The New York Times that if it were to be put on the market, it would probably "occupy the top end of the market, because the series is so singular in its significance and examples are so rare" and mostly held by museums. The notoriety attached to the painting due to the theft would probably increase its value as well, he added, as it did for the Mona Lisa in 1911.)

=== Recovery ===
In June 2017, Rita Alter, a former speech pathologist in the New York City public school system as well as the local school district in Cliff, New Mexico, died. She and her husband, Jerry, a former clarinetist and music teacher in the New York City schools who had predeceased her in 2012, had retired to the area in 1977 and built a house on 8 ha (20 acres) of land near Gila National Forest that included a sculpture garden with busts of Beethoven and Molière, where they raised their own chickens and ducks. Her nephew, Ron Roseman, was named executor of her estate.

Roseman sent photos of the Alter's artwork and statues to a dozen museums and auction houses. Roseman then hired a local realtor, Ruth Seawolf, to sell the Alters' house. As the two were touring the house to prepare for the sale, Seawolf noticed several items in the house that might be of interest to someone she knew, mainly pottery and African pieces. She called up a friend, David Van Auker, who ran an antique store in nearby Silver City, and Roseman hired him to appraise the art and furniture in the house that the family itself had not wanted. He sought to sell them those items in bulk so the family could then sell the emptied house and dispose of the estate. Van Auker went to the house to inspect the contents in August.

During Van Auker's tour, in addition to the art Seawolf had told him about, he found another painting in the Alters' master bedroom, hung on the wall next to the door in such a way that it was visible only when the door was closed, a discovery he made only when he closed the door to get a better look at a broken dresser drawer, part of the room's mid-century furniture set, which he thought could be sold together at a good price. While he did not recognize the painting, it appeared to him to be the work of a mid-20th century artist as well, which he thought was "great" and "cool", although he thought very little of its frame.

Van Auker bought the contents of the house for US$2,000 and returned the next day with some friends to take the artwork and furniture back to his store. They put the painting atop the pile in their truck and drove it back to Silver City, where he put it on display, propping it up against the wall on the floor. He intended to change the frame, which he disliked, and hang it in his guesthouse.

Silver City has a large population of artists, and shortly after Van Auker put it on display, a customer recognized it as a work by de Kooning, a remark the proprietors dismissed. But within an hour, two other customers had made the same assessment; one man even returned several times and offered to buy the painting for US$200,000. Van Auker, realizing he might have acquired something more valuable than he appreciated, decided to put the painting in a bathroom, the only room in the store that could be locked. He did an Internet search, which eventually led him to a 2015 article about Woman-Ochre in The Arizona Republic.

"It was really a shock. Prior to having our store, we were antique dealers, and every single antique dealer around the world has the fantasy of doing exactly this. This is something you fantasize about your entire career, and here it is—not only did you find this very valuable object, it's a part of history."

— David Van Auker,

The painting Van Auker had bought from the Alters' house looked exactly like the stolen work, when he compared it to an online image, down to the drips and splatters. He called UAMA and told the receptionist he thought he had a painting that had been stolen from them. She immediately put him through to curator Olivia Miller, who asked him to measure it. It was 2.5 cm (1 inch) off from its 102 cm × 76 cm (40 in × 30 in) dimensions, consistent with having been cut from its original frame. After Van Auker also described how the paint had been cracked, as it might have been if it had been rolled up for some time, Miller asked him to take pictures of the painting's rear with his cellphone and send them to her. The marks on them matched the ones on file for de Kooning's work.

News that a masterpiece of modern art had somehow ended up in a local antique shop got around Silver City, and by the end of the day 40 people had shown up to ask if they could see it. On the advice of the Albuquerque FBI office, which told him to put it in "a very safe place", Van Auker took the painting back to his Pinos Altos home and hid it behind his sofa, staying up all night and guarding it with his guns. The next day, needing to keep it somewhere while he ran the shop, Van Auker and his partners drove it around town, looking for someone whom they could temporarily place it with. A lawyer they were acquainted with doubted the story until he saw the painting, and agreed to take it for the day.

FBI agents from the Phoenix office, who had been investigating the theft since university police turned the case over to them, made the 362 km (225 mi) trip east along with Miller and a UAMA team later in that day. At the lawyer's house, where he was having a small party for family and friends, the Grant County sheriff greeted Van Auker, Miller and the FBI agents. When she saw Woman-Ochre in the lawyer's home office upstairs, Miller fell to her knees and gasped, a moment Van Auker recalled as "electric". "Holy shitballs!" she said, as during her entire tenure at the museum she had come to know the painting well, yet never actually seen it in person. (Note: Miller has since described the painting as having taken on the status of a "sacred object". She told The New York Times that "[i]t became so treasured—the museum wanted it back so badly, and so much time was dedicated to looking at this image and thinking about this image ... And then to have it returned, have so many people rally around it and have the Getty spend years taking care of it, this human element has imbued the painting with new significance.") They had brought the frame that originally housed the painting, and its remaining threads matched those still on the painting.

The law enforcement officers present promptly moved the painting to a vault for the coming weekend. Afterwards a UAMA van arrived to take the painting back to Tucson. New Mexico State Police escorted it to the state line, where their Arizona counterparts took over as it made the journey down Interstate 10 to the museum.

After its return, Woman-Ochre was allowed to rest for a few days. Following that period, Nancy Odegaard, a conservator at the nearby Arizona State Museum, began the final process of authentication. She and her graduate student found a sticker from the 1969 traveling Smithsonian exhibit on the painting's rear. An ultraviolet light detected an acrylic varnish. There was also evidence of repairs the museum had made, and recorded, before 1985.

Finally, Odegaard and her student put the painting over the original frame it had been cut from and compared the canvas. The damage to the painting and the damage to the threads that had remained matched perfectly, including the colors of stray paint. A large stray black stroke in the upper left corner that matched that on the remnants provided the final confirmation, and Odegaard formally authenticated the painting. On 11 August the museum held a news conference announcing that Woman-Ochre had been recovered after 31 years.

University police chief Brian Seastone, who had investigated the case in 1987, was elated. "Somebody saw something, they said something, and today she's home." Van Auker, who was also present, described how he had come to find the painting and his role in the process of its recovery. He declined a reward, and brushed aside suggestions that he was somehow heroic. "We returned something that was stolen, and that's something everyone should do."

The university gave Van Auker the gold wooden frame the painting had been hung in when it was stolen. He and the shop's co-owner, Buck Burns, have hung it in a guest house they own, where they had originally planned to hang the painting before they learned of its true origin. Van Auker said visitors to their shop ask about the painting at least once a day; they also still receive calls expressing gratitude.

In 2022 they visited the Getty to see the painting after its restoration. Miller observed that if the theft represented people at their worst, its recovery showed "the best of people". A photo of the two is on display at the Getty with the painting.

==== Repair and restoration ====
In August 2019 Miller told the Arizona Daily Star that she could not say when it could be restored to exhibit as it could not be taken from the museum to the conservator's shop until the FBI closed the case.

The instrument used during the theft to remove the painting from its frame was sharp enough to cut cleanly through the canvas, but for that same reason it would take a long time to match the threads exactly and reattach them, Miller explained. One of the corners had torn, she added. She and Odegaard both commented on the many small sections of paint that had flaked off the horizontal creases formed across the painting when it was rolled up.

At some point after the theft, the painting had been reframed into the one that Van Auker had found so unappealing when he first saw it. Whoever had done that work had done it crudely, using flat screws to attach the canvas to the wood, causing further damage. The lack of temperature and humidity controls at the Alter house also left the paint brittle; Miller said it was fortunate that more paint had not been lost.

Nevertheless, the Alters appeared to have taken some measures to protect it while it hung in their bedroom. A reporter from Dallas-based television station WFAA was able to tour the house for a short documentary about the case, and noted that a heavy screw had been partially driven into the baseboard at the floor level below the wall where the painting hung, effectively serving as a doorstop that prevented the door from opening fully and inadvertently damaging the painting. Likewise, the window on the side of the room that faced the setting sun was equipped with a heavy blackout curtain that would have blocked sunlight from the direction when drawn.

Shortly after its return the museum took the painting to a conservator's studio for the repair and restoration process. It originally expected to take a year, but near the end of that period, Miller said she was no longer so certain. UAMA started a fundraising drive to raise the US$1 million it expected the restoration would cost.

In March 2019, the museum announced it had chosen experts at the Getty Conservation Institute, associated with the J. Paul Getty Museum in Los Angeles, to repair Woman-Ochre. Before it went there, the museum put the painting on public display on St. Patrick's Day, an event for which a special fee was charged. Among the 250 people who attended was actor Hal Linden, who was performing in a nearby production of A.R. Gurney's play Love Letters. "I'm really taken by the drama of the story", he told the Republic. "I would love to know the story of the people who lived with it in their home."

Experts at the Getty, who were present, said they expected it would take 14 or 15 months to fully repair Woman-Ochre. During the restoration, conservators had to decide to what degree they would leave damage related to the theft intact, since the theft is now part of the painting's history. They would also have to avoid over-restoring the work to the point where it would look too artificial.

The institute did the work for free in exchange for the Getty museum being allowed to exhibit the work after it was restored. Originally, UAMA expected to have Woman-Ochre back on its walls where it was stolen from after Thanksgiving 2020, around the 35th anniversary of its theft; those plans were postponed by the COVID-19 pandemic and the closure of many art museums at that time. At one point the conservators at the Getty could only spend one day a week working on the painting.

The conservators' primary task was to stabilize the paint surface. Damage done during the theft had been compounded by the thieves' having rolled it up immediately afterwards, cracking the paint in many places. Since the thieves had not been aware of the secondary canvas attached to the back with a wax resin, they had not cut it completely and had ripped the painting out where they could not cut, in addition to rolling the primary canvas off the secondary one, an action that led to a later patch on the back of the primary canvas put there with common white glue. "There was a lot of violence to the way the canvas was pulled away from the backing canvas. The word trauma comes to mind", said Tom Learner, the Getty's head of science.

One conservator, Laura Rivers, used "gentle heat and tiny dental tools" to reattach paint flakes, "It was ... the most damaged painting that I have ever worked on," she said. She found those flakes with a microscope, scattered across the entire painting like "visual noise". Rivers was often able to work on only 2.5 cm (1 in) of the painting a day.

Once she had finished that task, Rivers removed two layers of varnish, one added by MoMA in 1974 and the other by the thieves, (Note: She believes the latter did that to improve the painting's appearance.) with solvent mixtures, allowing de Kooning's original colors to return. She noted that one of the two varnishes was slightly fluid at room temperature, which had led to the painting collecting much of the dust in the desert air during the time it was in the Alters' home.

After flattening the canvas so that it could be reattached to the portions left behind in the original frame during the theft, a process that the institute's senior conservator, Ulrich Birkmaier, says took two years, he completed the restoration by reattaching all the sliced canvas fibers. Using a very small paintbrush that barely touched the canvas, he painted in gaps left by the cracks, always avoiding any of de Kooning's original work; although he did remove and paint over some areas where the thieves had made "amateurish restoration attempts" of their own. In an interview with the Arizona Republic, he compared the painting to a puzzle, where "you only fill in the pieces that are missing."

While modern viewers will know the painting was stolen, recovered and restored, Birkmaier said, viewers later in the century may not. "Hopefully, there's just a painting with some slight scars (that) to the casual viewer won't be visible really", he said of the restoration. Writing in The New York Times, Jori Finkel noted a close observer can discern the impressions left by the staples the thieves used to attach the canvas to a new stretcher bar and some unevenness close to the frame where the reattached fibers did not perfectly match. "And, if you know where to look, you can probably make out a few of the tears that were repaired, like one beneath the artist's signature."

Learner was proud that there was not a single remnant of the damage from the theft that would blatantly mar the painting. It would, he told the Times, take a very large one since "There's so much action in the painting, [it] works to our advantage." Finkel agreed, commenting that "maybe in this strange way the violence of the theft and the violence of de Kooning's imagery will now work together, woven into the very fabric of this newly conserved painting."

From June to August 2022 Woman-Ochre was on temporary exhibit at the J. Paul Getty Museum in Los Angeles.

==== Investigation ====
Although the painting was recovered, the investigation into the theft has continued, as the FBI cannot say for certain that the Alters had anything to do with the theft or that they knew Woman-Ochre was stolen when they took possession of it. A considerable amount of circumstantial evidence, some of which has emerged since the recovery, connects the Alters to the crime, however. They were apparently fans of de Kooning's work, as several replica sketches of drawings by the artist were also found in their home.

While going through his aunt and uncle's estate, Roseman, who still strongly doubts that they were the thieves, found a picture taken showing the couple at a family Thanksgiving dinner in 1985, the day before the painting was stolen. When the photo is compared side by side with the sketches distributed after the crime, they did show an apparent resemblance. Three people The New York Times spoke with confirmed that in the mid-1980s, the Alters primarily traveled in a red two-door Nissan sports car, and the FBI found home movies they took showing them traveling in that car then.

The Alters kept, at that time of their lives, a day planner which they used as a diary, documenting the medications they took, where they went, and what they ate on a regular basis. But the entry for Thanksgiving 1985 is uncharacteristically blank. In one piece of luggage in the house, Seawolf found a small compartment containing a scarf and glasses she believed were similar to those the female thief wore to the museum. The FBI, however, did not appear interested when she contacted them about the items, she said.

Seawolf has speculated that the woman may actually have been a man in disguise, perhaps Jerry Alter, since descriptions of the man involved suggest he appeared to be in his late 20s or early 30s, half the age Jerry would have been at the time. The man could have been one of the Alters' children, Joseph, who also appears in the 1985 Tucson Thanksgiving dinner photos; at the time he was 23. Roseman said Joseph, who also has lived in Silver City, has had psychiatric issues that have required lengthy hospital stays throughout his life, including at the time Roseman talked to the Times about the case. Roseman did, however, tell the Republic that at some point after the painting's recovery he had taken a picture of Woman-Ochre to show Joseph while visiting him, which made him laugh hysterically. "That's one of the ugliest paintings I've ever seen!" he said.

Journalists also discovered another apparent link between the Alters and the theft of the painting in the three books the couple published. In one, about their extensive travels, two chapters discussed museums where thefts had occurred. And in 2011, a year before he died, Jerry had self-published through Amazon a collection of short stories called The Cup and the Lip: Exotic Tales, which he called "an amalgamation of fantasy and reality" in his introduction. One, "The Eye of the Jaguar", particularly struck readers after the missing Woman-Ochre was found in the Alters' house.

In it, a grandmother and granddaughter visit an art museum near their homes and are taken by a 120-carat emerald on display. They ask the guard, Lou, for the history of the stone. Six months later, Lou sees them return and then leave again quickly. After he sees that the emerald has been taken, he runs out to stop them as the women flee in the grandmother's car, but is killed when she runs him over, leaving "absolutely no clues which police could use". At the end, the emerald is kept in a hidden display case in the grandmother's house "where two pairs of eyes, exclusively, are there to see!"

The fictional theft has a similar modus operandi to the theft of Woman-Ochre, and its display where only two people can see it also recalls how the Alters kept the painting in their bedroom such that they were the only people likely to know it was there. One other person who did, an artist neighbor who went into the bedroom with the Alters' permission to photograph a painting she had made of them on horseback in the Himalayas, then hung there, recalled seeing the de Kooning and asking the couple about it; they did not answer her questions and did not want to talk about it.

Other relatives of the Alters who have talked to the media dismiss the possibility the couple could have stolen the painting. "[They wouldn't] risk something as wild and crazy as grand larceny—risk the possibility of winding up in prison, for God's sake—they wouldn't do that", Rita's younger sister told the Times. "My driving instinct is to say: 'This couldn't be my aunt and uncle who had it since the beginning'" Roseman said, although he allowed that it was possible since he knew little more about their lives than their neighbors did. He said of the people he had shown the sketches to, about half thought it might be them, although he himself did not, but he admitted he probably could not be objective.

Roseman, who also saw the painting behind his aunt and uncle's door when he began arranging support services for Rita due to her worsening dementia early in 2017, but did not recognize it, has offered an alternative theory as to how the couple came into possession of Woman-Ochre. They liked to visit galleries and museums, he recalled, and believed that someone might have seen them appreciating a de Kooning at one and offered them a better painting, the stolen one, from their personal collection. The Alters might even have believed it was a copy.

However, other evidence suggests the painting had been in the Alter house since its theft. Van Auker recalled that not only were there dusty cobwebs between the frame and the wall, the space behind the painting was lighter and free from dust, with a visible outline where the painting had hung, suggesting it had been there for a long time. UAMA staff also found evidence of only one reframing.

Roseman said that when he was a student at Arizona himself during the late 1970s and early 1980s, he visited them at least once a month, visits he recalled fondly as they would share stories and pictures from their travels. But since his graduation and eventual relocation to Houston, he was not able to make the trip as frequently. He concluded that he was not as close to them as he thought.

After the rediscovery of Woman-Ochre in the Alters' house, their neighbors, who described the couple as pleasant but generally keeping their own company, also noted that it seemed strange that they had been able to travel so much—their book jackets said they had visited "140 countries on all seven continents, including both polar regions"—on their salaries as public school teachers, or (later) their pensions, often being away from Cliff for weeks at a time. After Rita's death, bank records showed the couple had over a million dollars in their account. "I guess they figured they were being frugal", Roseman told The Washington Post.

== Documentary ==
In 2021 director Allison Otto began filming The Thief Collector, a documentary about the painting and its theft. "As our team dug deep into the tale, we discovered that the theft itself is just the tip of the iceberg", she said. Van Auker expected that when it is completed and released, a third surge in tourism to Silver City and the store will result. "It would be great to be used as a positive reflection for what our community is about. It's awesome and amazing that we get to be part of this place, and part of a great story." The filmmakers have reportedly expressed the hope that the documentary stirs enough interest to make the story the basis of a fictional feature film.

A still photo of Jerry Alter inside the house used in The Thief Collector showed two paintings behind him, Oklahoma Cheyenne aka Indian Boy in Full Dress by Joseph Henry Sharp and Aspens, by Victor Higgins. Both had been stolen from the University of New Mexico's Harwood Museum of Art in Taos, during 1985. They were not among the works in the Alters' house when they died; investigators found they had been sold at auction in Scottsdale, Arizona, in 2018. The paintings were correctly attributed but used different titles, titles which have never been used in any documentation or catalog of either artist's work. After a reporter let the museum know in 2023, the FBI took the case, located the paintings and returned them to the Harwood in 2025.

== See also ==
- Crime in Arizona
- List of stolen paintings
