= What If? Ehud Barak on War and Peace =

- Directed by: Ran Tal
- Written by: Ran Tal
- Produced by: Lama Films - Amir Harel, Ayelet Kait, Ran Tal
- Starring: Ehud Barak
- Cinematography: Giora Bejach
- Edited by: Nili Feller
- Music by: Haim Frank Ilfman
- Release date: 2021
- Running time: 85 minutes
- Country: Israel
- Language: Hebrew with English subtitles

What If? Ehud Barak on War and Peace is a 2021 Israeli documentary drama film written and directed by Ran Tal.

== Synopsis ==
In this documentary, former Israeli prime minister Ehud Barak looks back on his life and analyzes the Israeli reality with a critical eye. Two decades after his forced resignation as premier following the Camp David 2000 conference's failure, he observes his own and Israel's history with disillusioned clarity.

== Selected festivals ==
- Golden Apricot Yerevan International Film Festival, Armenia, 2021
- Other Israel Film Festival, US, 2021
- Cambridge Film Festival, UK, 2021
- UK Jewish Film Festival, 2021
- Geneva Jewish Film Festival, Switzerland, 2021
- Moscow International Film Festival, Official Competition, 2021
