= Children of the Sun (2007 film) =

- Film poster
- Directed by: Ran Tal
- Written by: Ron Goldman, Ran Tal
- Produced by: Amir Harel; Ayelet Kait; Ran Tal
- Edited by: Ron Goldman
- Music by: Avi Belleli
- Distributed by: Fortissimo Films, Maximum Film Distribution (Canada)
- Release date: July 13, 2007 (Jerusalem Film Festival)
- Running time: 70 minutes
- Country: Israel
- Language: Hebrew

Children of the Sun (Hebrew: ילדי השמש) is a 2007 documentary film about the Israeli kibbutz directed by Ran Tal. It won the Best Documentary and Best Editing Awards at the 2007 Jerusalem Film Festival and Best Documentary at the 2008 Ophir Awards.

== Synopsis ==
Tal, who was himself born on Kibbutz Beit HaShita, examines the "children of the Sun" - the first generation of kibbutz children who were separated from their parents and raised according to the principles of Kibbutz communal child rearing and collective education. The film combines archival footage culled from over 80 amateur films shot between 1930 and 1970, rare recordings and interviews with 18 people who had been born on kibbutzim in the 1930s reflecting with both nostalgia and bitterness on their unconventional childhoods and being the unwitting subjects in an ambitious social and ideological experiment.
