= Ran Tal =

Israeli film director

- רן טל
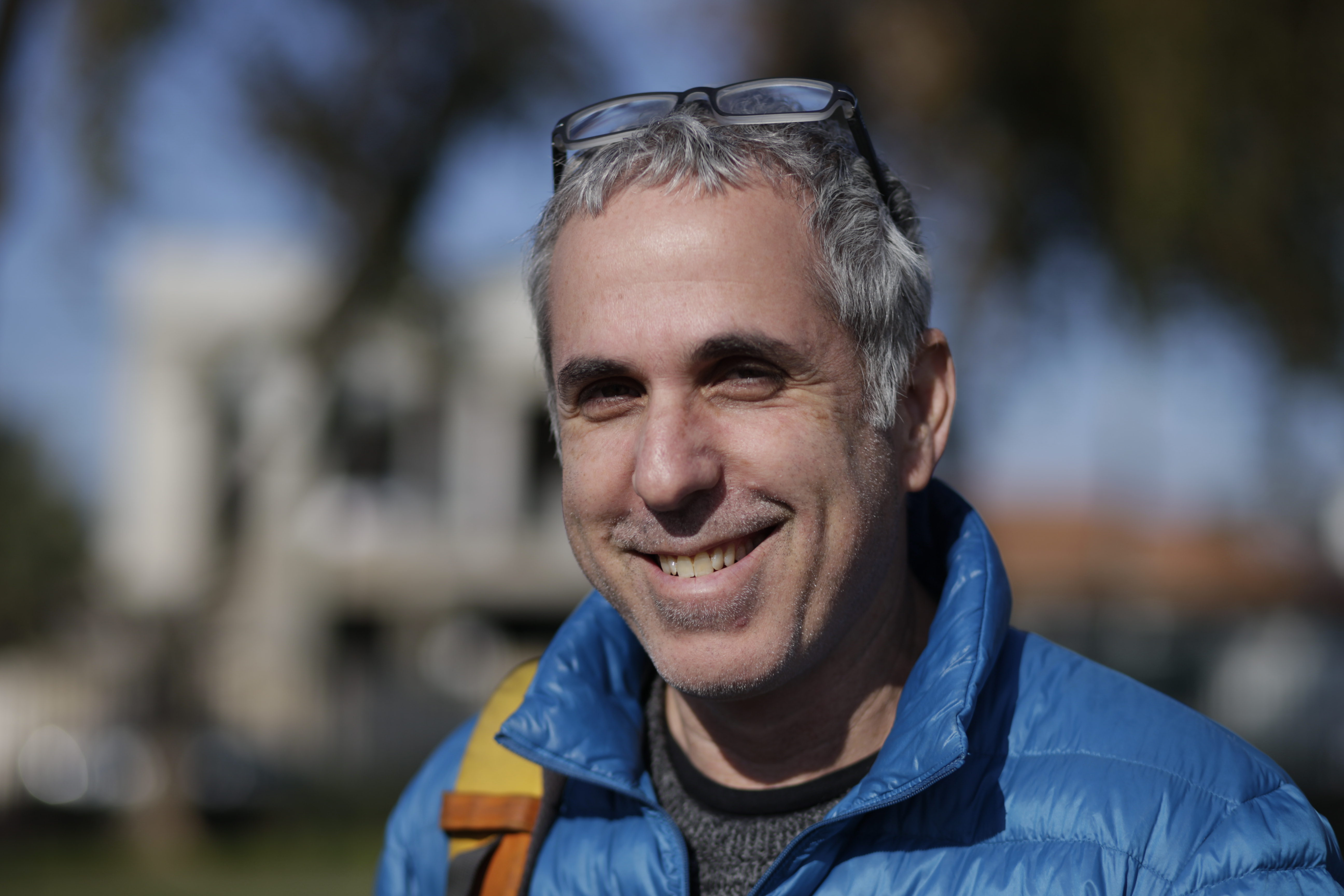
- Born: 1963; Beit HaShita, Israel
- Education: Tel Aviv University
- Occupation: Documentary filmmaker
- Years active: 1994–present

Ran Tal (Hebrew: רן טל; born 1963) is an Israeli film director specializing in documentary filmmaking.

== Career ==
Tal began his filmmaking career in 1996 by co-directing "Skin Deep" with Etgar Keret, which won the Ophir Award. His 2007 film Children of the Sun, based on his family's memories, won the Jerusalem Film Festival and the Ophir Award, and was screened at the Toronto International Film Festival.

In 2012, he directed "Garden of Eden", which won the Jerusalem Film Festival and was screened at IDFA and Hot Docs. His 2017 documentary "The Museum", is an ideological work that explores the Israel Museum, focusing on its people and the intersection of art, history, and national identity.

In 2022, Tal directed 1341 Frames of Love and War, a film that explores the life and work of photographer Micah Bar-Am through his extensive photo archive. The film was subsequently adapted into an exhibition at the Tel Aviv Museum of Art.

In addition to filmmaking, he heads the international MFA documentary film program at Tel Aviv University's Steve Tisch School of Film and Television.

== Filmography ==
- 1996: Skin Deep (short film)
- 1998: 67 Ben Tsvi Road
- 1999: Prostheses (short film)
- 2000: Non-White Jews
- 2005: My Dream House
- 2007: Children of the Sun
- 2008: Born Again
- 2009: Gitai in Search of his Carmel
- 2012: The Garden of Eden
- 2012: Shi'ur BeKaduregel
- 2017: The Museum
- 2021: What If? Ehud Barak on War and Peace
- 2022: 1341 Frames of Love and War
