= Kibbutz communal child rearing and collective education =

Method of education prevalent in collective communities in Israel until the 1980s

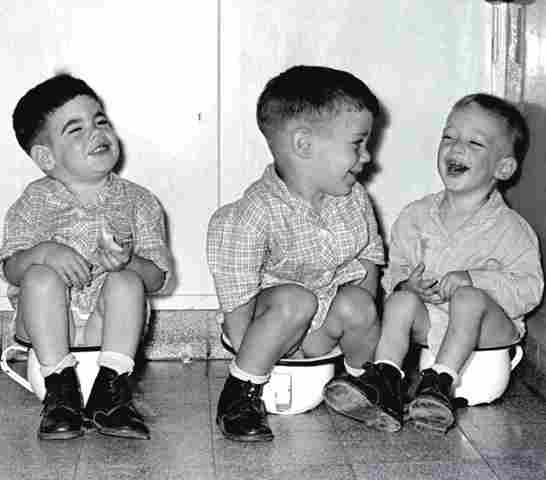
Kibbutz children sitting on chamber pots as part of their collective education for personal hygiene. Kibbutz Eilon in the mid-1960s.

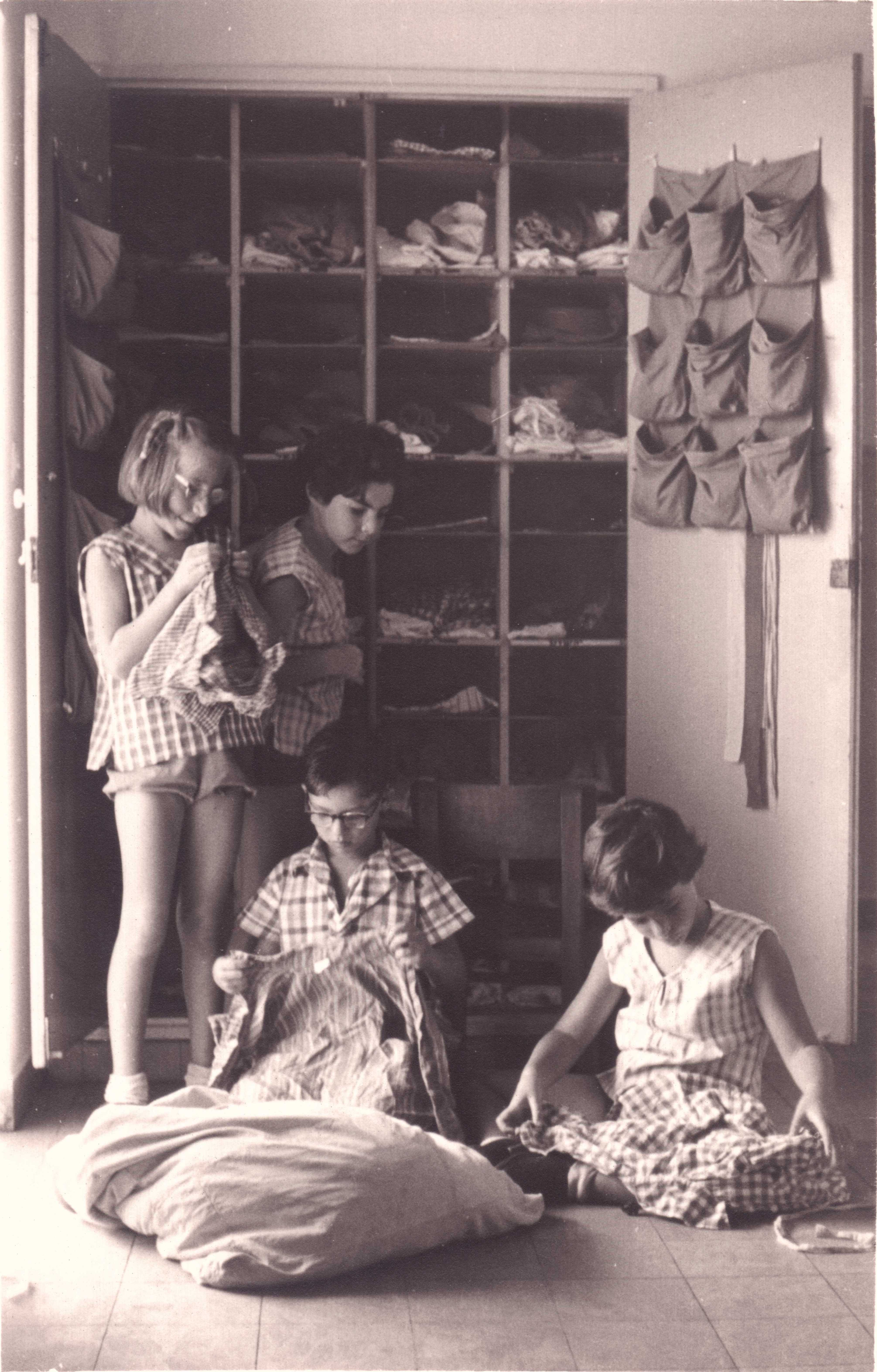
Kibbutz Eilon children arrange their clothes in the common closet. The sack of clean laundry lies in front.

Communal child rearing was the method of education that prevailed in the collective communities in Israel (kibbutz; plural: kibbutzim), until about the end of the 1980s.

Collective education started on the day of birth and went on until adulthood. At the time it was considered a natural outcome of the principle of equality, which was part and parcel of the kibbutz life. The education authority of the kibbutz was responsible for the rearing and well-being of all the children born on the kibbutz, taking care of their food, clothing, and medical treatment. Everybody received the same share of everything. Parents were not involved economically in the upbringing of their children.

Children's lives had three focal points: the children's house, parents' house, and the whole kibbutz. They lived in the children's house, where they had communal sleeping arrangements and visited their parents for 2–3 hours a day.

Non-selectivity was a fundamental principle of collective education; every child got 12 years of study, they took no tests whatsoever, and no grades were recorded. The founders of the kibbutz actually aimed at creating "the 'new man' of a utopian society."

== Three concentric circles of life ==
Collective education was carried out within the boundaries of three concentric circles: the children's house, the parents' house, and the kibbutz community.

=== Children's house ===
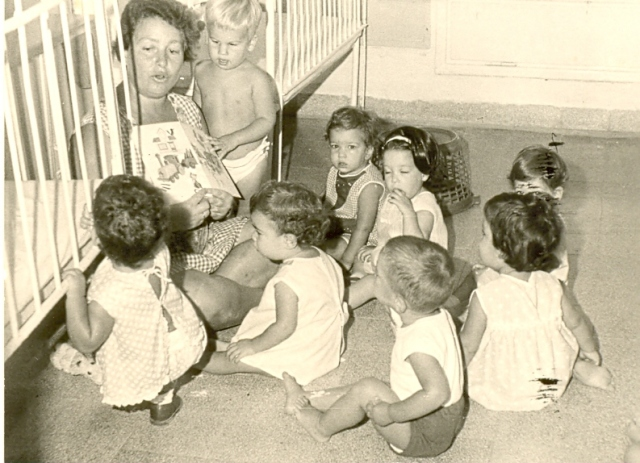
Kibbutz Afikim children with their nanny at the children's house. Mid 1960s.

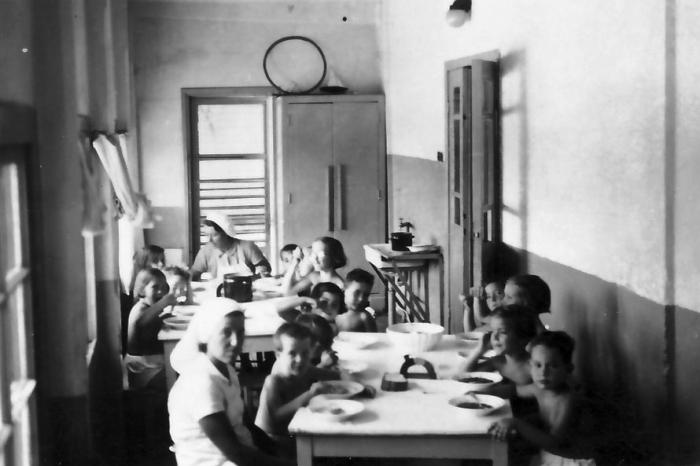
Kibutz Gan Shmuel 1935-40

A group of children, all about the same age, shared a children's house and had a nanny who took care of their everyday needs. Each house had a dining hall, a classroom, bedrooms (3–4 children in each room), and a bathroom. Boys and girls took showers together during elementary school up to the sixth grade, and usually shared their bedrooms even until the end of high school.

This was the kibbutz children's house, where they learned, had their meals, took their showers, slept, and woke up in the morning. This was where they got their clean clothes and from there their dirty laundry was sent, all tied up in a big bundle, back to the collective laundry.

Every child had a towel on a hanger in the bathroom and a smaller hand towel near the sink, with a small cup for a toothbrush. Each one also had two closet shelves, one for the morning clothing and another for the afternoon clothing. The nanny was in charge of the daily routine at the children's house.

== Kibbutz society and educators' role ==
The kibbutz was a collective community, and so was its education system. The kibbutz authorities provided equally for all children born to its members and they shared everything equally. The provision of health and psychological care was according to specific needs. Kibbutz members who were considered the most educated and esteemed got the position of educators. The nanny position was always a woman's role. Teacher positions were both for women and men.

=== Family and relationships with the parents ===
The family had no financial responsibility whatsoever; the kibbutz took care of its members' economic affairs. Kibbutz people believed that a woman's work outside of her house conflicted with her duties as a mother. In their eyes the kibbutz achieved women's social and economic liberation without hindering their role as mothers. This, so they claimed, was achieved by shifting the responsibility for education from the family to society at large.

The founders of the collective education believed that granting the children independence from their family liberated the family from the economic and social burden, which otherwise might distort the children's development. Family was neither the only nor the main focus in the children's education, since they had the educators and the whole kibbutz to support them. While the child's emotional needs were catered for by his or her family, the physical well-being, health care, and education as a whole were entrusted to the educators' expertise.

Fathers were supposed to bond with their children through quality time much more so than in a non-kibbutz environment, where they may be required to spend long hours at work.

Kibbutz people believed that as the necessary demands and requirements that are an essential part of every education process were eliminated from family life, the relationships between parents and their children got a chance to become much more moderate and harmonious. This, so they claimed, is how strong emotional ties with toddlers, friendship in childhood, and comradeship in youth facilitate strong family attachment and healthy influence of parents on their children.

== Education organization ==
Education organization was divided into stages:

- Babies (up to 1 year old) and toddlers (up to the age of 4 years) were kept in small sets of 4–8 children, mostly sextuplets
- Kindergarten (ages 4 to 7) was made up of 3 sextuplets, and this group of 14–22 children would stay together until they completed the 12th grade
- Children's society – first (in some cases only from second) grade up to sixth grade
- Youth society – seventh grade to twelfth grade

=== Babies (up to one year old) and toddlers ===
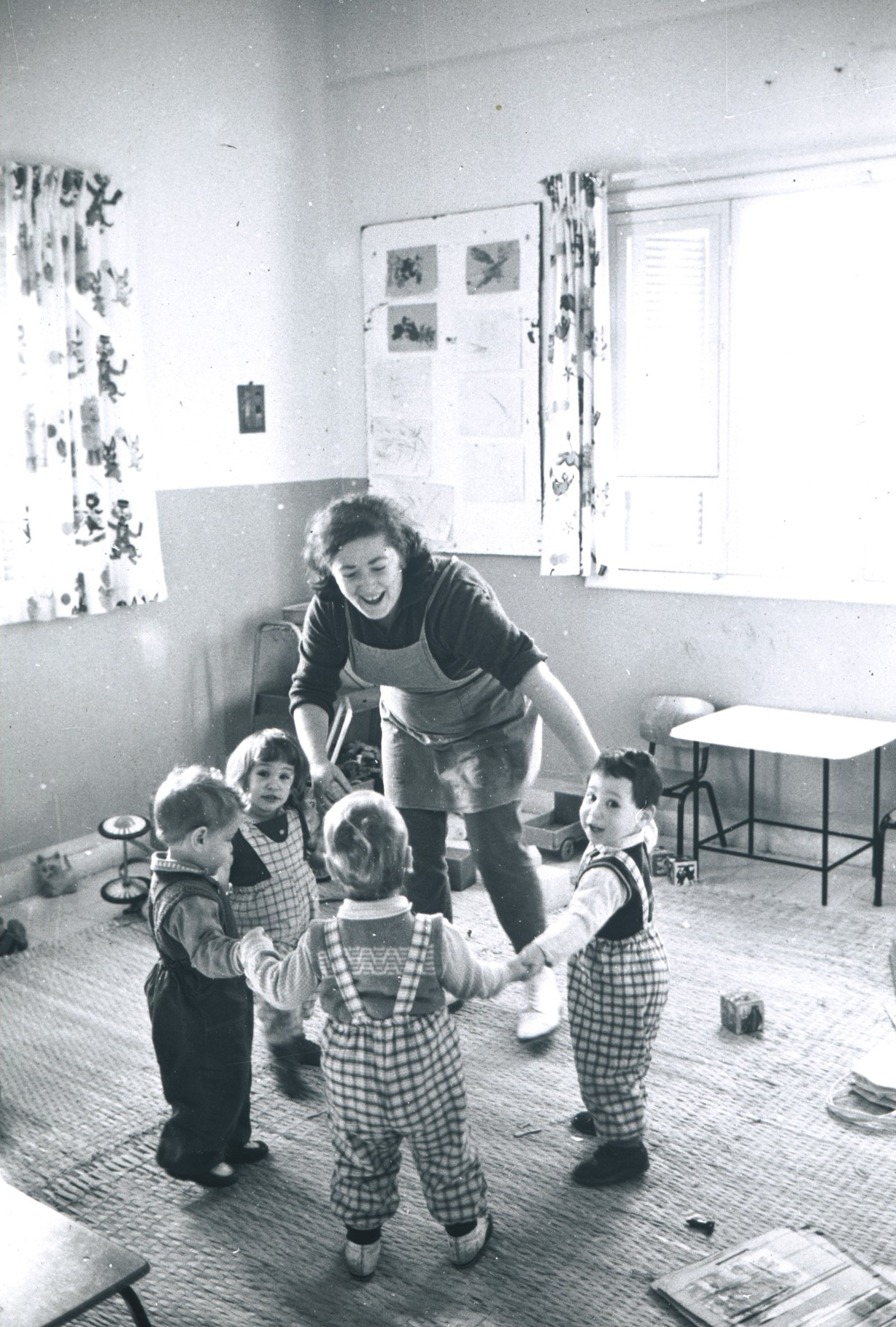
Toddlers in Kibbutz Merom Golan 1968–72

The newborn baby was brought from the hospital directly to the babies' house. The mother would get a six-week parental leave, after which she gradually returned to work, though not before the baby was fully weaned. Every afternoon, the parents would take their baby home for about an hour. In the early years of the kibbutz, parents were not allowed to enter the babies' house freely, as it was considered best to keep the place clean and orderly and let the nanny do her work. As years went by, the attitude became more relaxed in this matter and parents were allowed to visit their offspring during the day, in order to spend time together and establish emotional bonding. In addition to taking care of the baby, it was the nanny's responsibility to support the mothers, especially the young and inexperienced ones.

The arrangement of the newborns' house, its equipment and playground, and the correct way of offering toys in the right stage, were all believed to create the proper stimuli and the environment that might best fit babies, in order to avert boredom and satisfy the toddlers' emotional needs.

Babies were transferred to the toddlers' house by their second year. At that point each sextuplet had its own nanny and her job was to provide each one of the babies an outstanding personal rearing.

=== Kindergarten (ages 4–7) ===
About three sextuplets comprised a kindergarten group, with their pre-school teacher and nanny. This was regarded as the children's home, which provided intimacy and close relations with peers. This is where they achieved their first level of socialization. Instead of rivalry, aggressiveness, and hatred, they were supposed to get an opportunity for cooperation, mutual support, and compassion.

=== Children's society – first to sixth grade ===
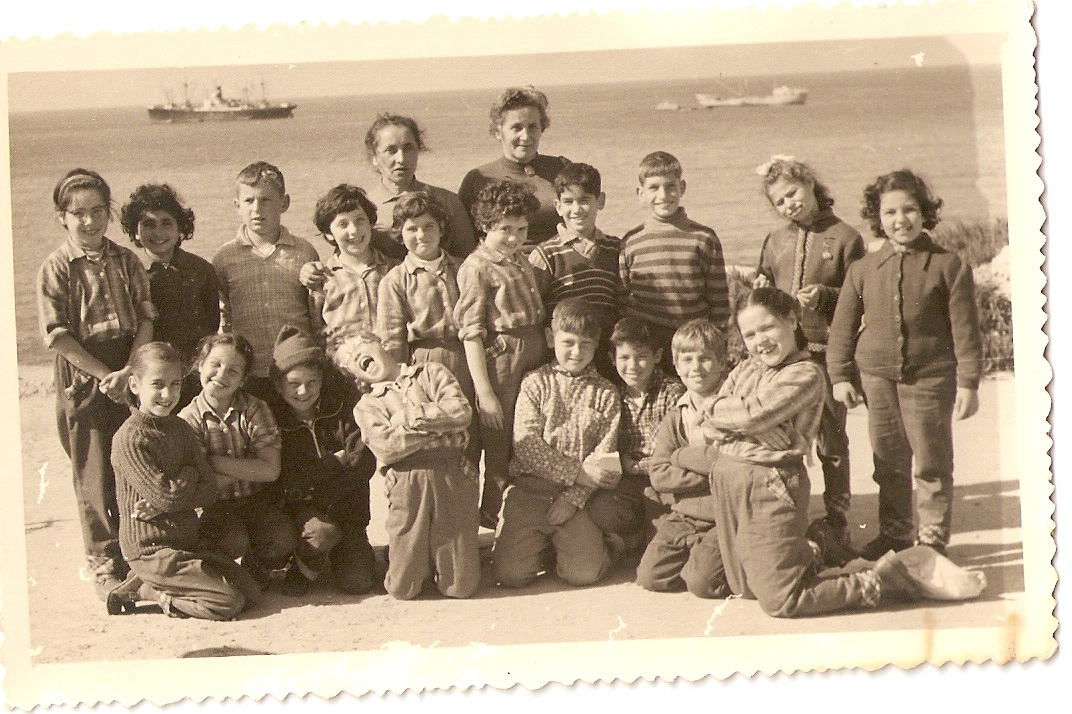
Children of Kibutz Einat, 1950

The group that was formed during the kindergarten years moved next together with their nanny to the children's society, where they would get a teacher as well. The children's society was composed of the age groups of children from the first or second grade to the sixth grade. Teachers were considered "educators", some of them women and some men. Nannies were always women.

Everyone, children and adults, would call each other by their first names, and relationships were intentionally very familial and informal. The children would choose a name for their group by voting; afterward, they would frequently be referred to by their first name plus the group name, omitting their family name. More often than not, the teacher and nanny would stay with the same group of children up until the end of the sixth grade. Children grew up, studied, slept, and worked together in this wide-ranging educational frame, mostly within their intimate group, and sometimes in the wider children's society.

=== Youth society – 7th to 12th grade ===
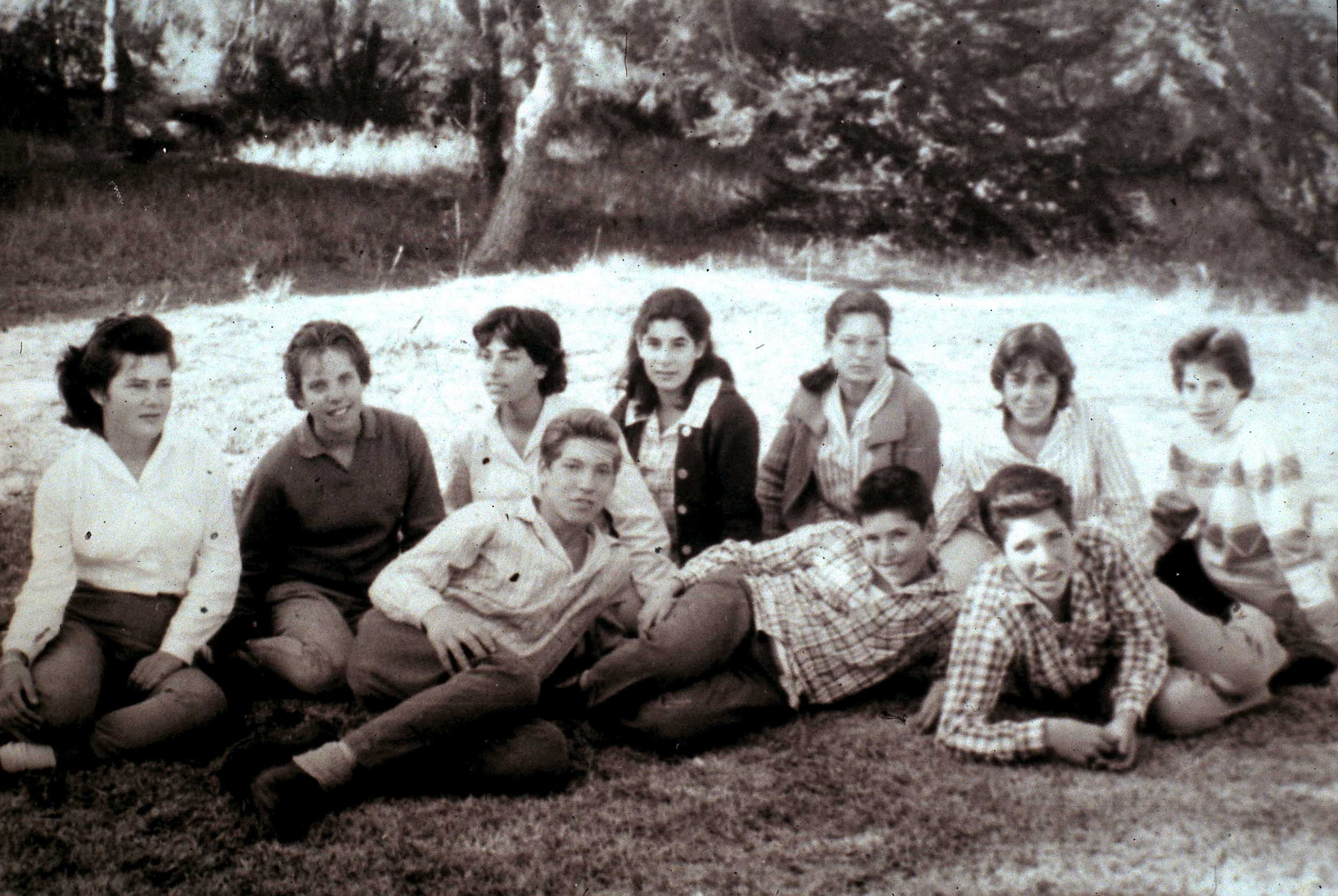
Children in Kibbutz Givat Haim Meuchad, 1967

As they reached the seventh grade, the group progressed to the youth society, where they stayed until the end of twelfth grade. By this stage, the teacher and nanny separated from this group, and the adolescents would get a new team of educators. Kibbutzim from the 'HaArtzi' movement established boarding schools (mosadot), which were shared by several neighboring kibbutzim. They represented the ideal of a kibbutz community 'in miniature form' and would have their own dining halls and facilities.

The founding fathers of the collective education strongly believed that by this age the group held a major significance for its members. This was the place for them to clarify their personal and social concerns, and this way the group was believed to function as the best setting to educate the youngsters and mold their characters. The youth society acted in a manner of directed independence and the student government was guided by the team of educators. At the students' general meeting, all matters concerning campus life were discussed and decided upon, except the school curriculum, security issues, and health matters.

All students were expected to work as the semi-professional curriculum was an essential part of school life.

== Education, teaching, and social life ==
Although all children of the collective education had similar life conditions and even though public opinion was highly considered, educators were proud to stress the fact that individuality remained crystal clear; they were very much willing to support artistic creativity (writing, drawing, and music), journal writing, and reading of books.

Social applicability of learning was considered more important than knowledge per se. Putting forth an effort, moral behavior, and social involvement were seen as equivalent to academic achievements, and so was youth movement leadership.

Any distinction between formal teaching and other forms of educating was non-existent, and both were under the guidance of the education team. Although collective education was non-selective and all children were entitled to the same learning circumstances, no demand was made to have equal achievements. Children- and youth-societies were considered "living organisms made up of dissimilar persons, each needing its individual attention".

=== Inter-disciplinary learning ===
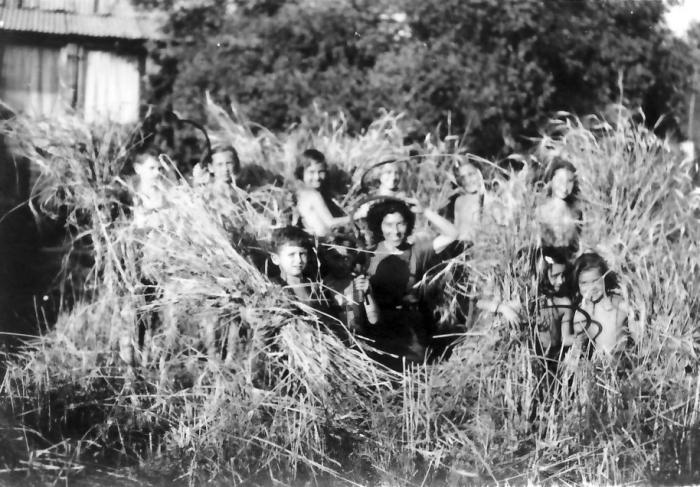
Kibutz Gan Shmuel – inter-disciplinary learning – all about bread

In order to stay true to life as they understood it, the kibbutz education adopted an inter-disciplinary method of learning.

In elementary school, learning was based on children's everyday life: "The Bee and the Flower", "The Ant", "Mail", etc. One interdisciplinary subject would last for two to six weeks, according to age.

The high school curriculum was divided in two: Humanistic (literature, geography, society, and economics) and realistic (physics, chemistry, and biology). In addition, the curriculum included languages: Hebrew, English, and Arabic, mathematics, gymnastics, painting, music.

=== Literary mock-trials ===
The youth society would gather once a year in order to conduct a literary mock trial. Everybody at school, including students and the education team, would read a book and then debate the dilemma it brought up, such as a controversial character. The school would create a court which had members from all the youth society groups: a defendant, judges, prosecutor, a defense, and witnesses. Judges and lawyers wore black robes and the rest of the participants were dressed up according to their characters. The mock-trial took place in front of the school general assembly.

Examples for literary mock-trials were:

- Lord of the Flies by William Golding
- The Enemy by Pearl S. Buck
- To Kill a Mockingbird by Harper Lee

=== Work ===
Work was an essential building block of the collective education. Young children worked in their close surroundings, helped clean their home, took care of the school zoological garden, and tended their vegetable garden. High school students worked in the agricultural branches and industries the kibbutz owned. Many high school girls worked as nannies' aides at the younger children's houses.

Skills such as weaving, sewing, knitting, metalwork, and carpentry were taught as an intermediary between work and study as a part of the curriculum, so it was possible for diligent students to become semi-professionals.

== Kibbutz movement education department ==
The similarity of and philosophy of procedures was maintained by the departments of education of the kibbutz movement. They supervised the activities at the schools, had teachers' guidance programs, provided consultation to families of children with specific needs, published, set budgets, and determined the standards.

The movement had a school for kibbutz education professional training where they also held a research center.

== End of collective education ==
The kibbutzim evolved, and since the mid-1950s, and much more so since the 1970s, education was strongly influenced by these changes. The kibbutzim became less communal as the ideals of Zionism and socialism that the movement was founded upon became less popular with younger generations. Due to this, people on the kibbutzim wanted their children to live at home and not in the children's house, so communal sleeping arrangements were brought to an end.

Standardization of teaching methods and the introduction of examinations to kibbutz schools did away with multi-disciplinary learning. Many of the younger generation born on the kibbutz left for the big cities, so the kibbutz population shrank and aged. Many kibbutzim also went through a process of privatization, and higher education became prevalent, together with a decrease in the prominence of agriculture.

Ora Aviezer explains:

Collective education can be regarded as a failure. The family as the basic social unit has not been abolished in kibbutzim. On the contrary, familistic trends have become stronger than ever, and kibbutz parents have reclaimed their rights to care for their own children. Collective education has not produced a new type of human being, and any differences found between adults raised on and off the kibbutz have been minimal.

== See also ==
- School in the countryside

== Further interest (video recording) ==
- Tal, Ran (2007) Children of the Sun, TA. Lama Prod. (70 min) In Hebrew, with English subtitles
