= Fame: an art project =

2015 book by Robert Priseman

- Book cover featuring painting of Daul Kim
- Author: Robert Priseman
- Language: English
- Genre: Art
- Published: January 10, 2015
- Publication place: United Kingdom
- Pages: 236

Fame: an art project is a combined book and series of 100 paintings which were created by British artist Robert Priseman between 2012 and 2013. The paintings first went on public display at Art Exchange, UK in November 2013. WhiteBox AC New York City, in a show curated by Tony Guerrero in January 2014. and in 'Re-cycling Religion' at the Dukely Center, Miami in 2016.

== About ==
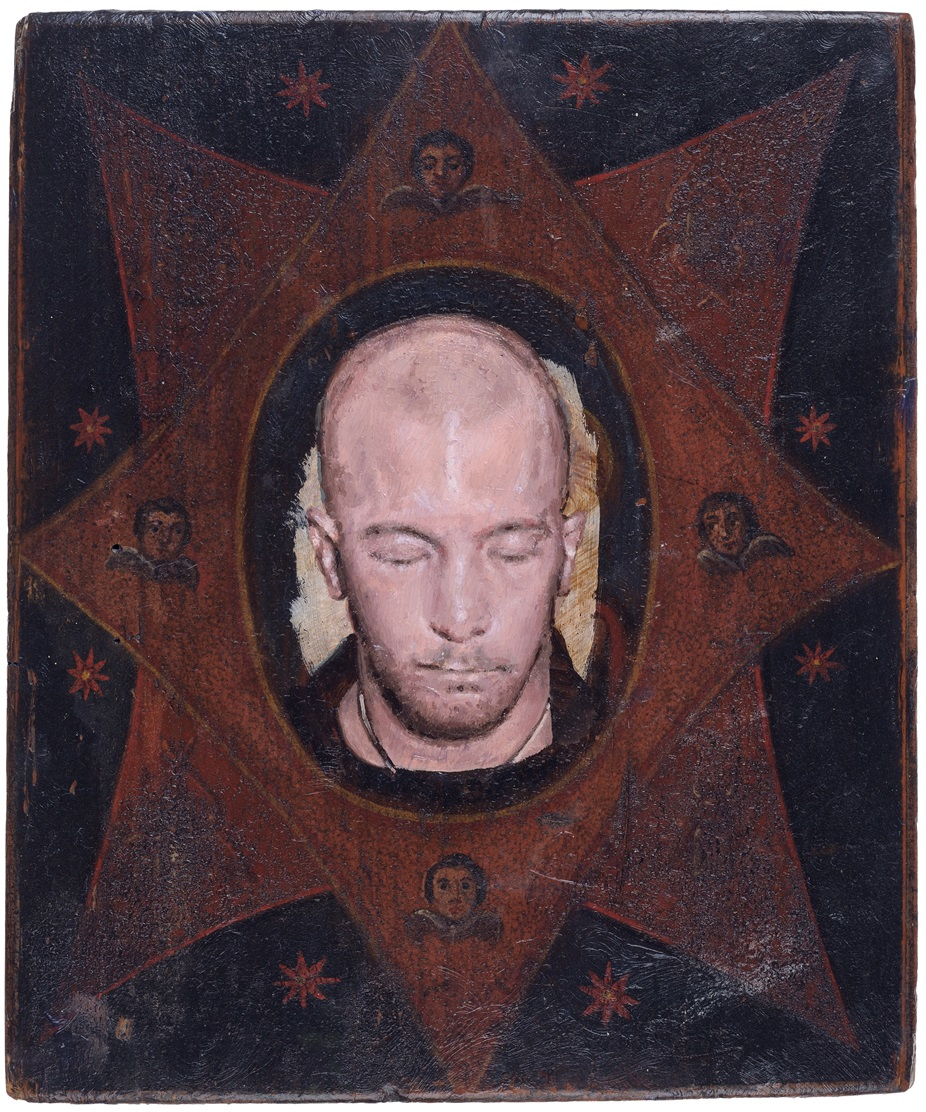
Jon Nödveidt by Robert Priseman from the 'Fame' series

In 2012 Robert Priseman purchased one hundred damaged religious icons from eBay and proceeded to over-paint each one with the portrait of a 20th-century celebrity who had died prematurely from suicide or as the result of a self-destructive lifestyle. The portraits are each the size of a postcard and painted to look like religious shrines.

It focuses on those amongst the celebrated who were troubled and at times unable to cope with the pressures of modern living.

The project portrays 50 men and 50 women from different countries, decades and creative disciplines who include writers Virginia Woolf, Ernest Hemingway, Sylvia Plath, artists such as Mark Rothko, Frida Kahlo, Diane Arbus, Jean-Michel Basquiat, Billie Holiday, actors Judy Garland, Dana Plato, Capucine and Marilyn Monroe as well as members of the “27 Club” of musicians who died at the age of 27 including Jim Morrison, Janis Joplin, Jimi Hendrix, Kurt Cobain, and Amy Winehouse.

Fame: an art project was first exhibited at Art Exchange, Colchester, Essex in 2013 and St Marylebone Crypt, London in 2015. Seventy-one of the originals are held in the permanent collection of The University of Arizona Museum of Art. The balance of the project is held in the collections of Honolulu Museum of Art, MOMA Wales, Mabee-Gerrer Museum of Art, Wayne State University Art Collection, Michigan, University of Michigan Museum of Art, The Allen Memorial Art Museum, Michigan and The Dennos Museum Center, Michigan who have 15 of the works.
