= The Thief Collector =

- Release poster
- Directed by: Allison Otto
- Written by: Mark Monroe; Nick Andert
- Produced by: Shizuka Asakawa; John Boccardo; Caryn Capotosto; Mary Kay Cook; Heath Cullens; Derek Esplin; Kathryn Everett; Andy Hsieh; Tony Hsieh; Joshua A. Kunau; Kathleen L'Esperance; Justin Lacob; Jill Latiano; Bryn Mooser
- Starring: Glenn Howerton; Sarah Minnich; Brandon Z Ruiz; Eric Banks; Hailee Cruzen; Katelyn Martinez; Scott Takeda
- Cinematography: Rod Hassler; Matt Ryan
- Edited by: Nick Andert
- Music by: Daniel Wohl
- Production company: XTR
- Distributed by: FilmRise
- Release date: 13 March 2022
- Running time: 106 minutes
- Country: United States
- Language: English

The Thief Collector is a 2022 American documentary film directed by Allison Otto. It tells the story of Woman-Ochre, a valuable Willem de Kooning oil painting, and the New Mexico married couple that allegedly stole it in 1985.

The film has received positive reviews, with praise for its story, tone, and humor.

== Synopsis ==
In 1985, Willem de Kooning’s oil painting Woman-Ochre vanished from the University of Arizona Museum of Art in Tucson. The $160 million work of art remained missing until 2017, when it was found hanging in the former home of Jerry and Rita Alter, a deceased New Mexico married couple. The film features interviews with the Alters' family members and those involved in the painting's disappearance and recovery. The film also utilizes actors to stage reenactments of the theft, as well as adaptations of short stories from a book written by Jerry Alter.

== Cast ==
- Glenn Howerton as Jerry Alter
- Sarah Minnich as Rita Alter
- Brandon Z Ruiz as José
- Eric Banks as Tony
- Hailee Cruzen as Lucy
- Katelyn Martinez as Student Guard
- Scott Takeda as Doctor

== Release ==
The film premiered at the South by Southwest film festival on March 13, 2022.

== Critical reception ==
On Rotten Tomatoes, the film has a 92% score based on 38 reviews. The site's consensus states: "An effortlessly engaging true-crime documentary, The Thief Collector reaffirms that reality can be stranger than fiction -- and sometimes just as entertaining." Metacritic reports an 70 out of 100 ratings based on four critics.
