= Ambulante Documentary Film Festival =

Film festival in Mexico

- Location: Mexico (various cities)
- Established: 2006
- Founded by: Gael García Bernal, Diego Luna, Elena Fortes
- Festival date: From February to May
- Website: www.ambulante.org

Ambulante Documentary Film Festival or Ambulante is a non-profit organization devoted to supporting and promoting documentary films as a tool for social and cultural transformation. Founded in 2005 by actors Gael García Bernal, Diego Luna and Elena Fortes, and currently directed by Paulina Suárez, Ambulante seeks to strengthening documentary film culture in Mexico and Central America, in order to contribute to a more open and critical society, and facilitate access to different perspectives from around the world. Among its work schemes, Ambulante identifies and travels to spaces with limited exhibition offers and training in documentary film, in order to promote cultural exchange, promote a participatory, critical and informed attitude in the viewer and open new channels of reflection in Mexico.

In 2014 and 2015, Ambulante held Ambulante California, a version of the festival in the United States.

== The Festival ==
One of Ambulante most iconic projects is the Ambulante Documentary Film Festival, the furthest-reaching documentary film festival in Mexico and a project that stands alone as a unique screening space. Throughout more than sixteen years, the Festival has covered thousands of miles in México with a central intention: to create an exciting and significant encounter between documentary film and its audience. To date, the Festival has held 1,154 events in 38 municipalities with an average of more than 84,000 attendees.

== Ambulante Beyond ==
Ambulante Beyond is a documentary production project with the objective of training new producers from various corners of Mexico and Central America who have limited access to the necessary tools to share their stories with the general public. We believe it is essential for the new opinion leaders to have access to communication tools, which will enable them to disseminate and share their personal, local and regional interests to constantly growing audience.

The initiative seeks to foster independent filmmaking, which enables marginalized communities to recover and strengthen their identity, and to reclaim their rights, as well as to break stereotypes and change the negative social archetypes associated with their peoples. We seek to celebrate the diversity and contribute to the democratization of audiovisual production by fostering stories told from a unique cultural and aesthetical perspective, without imposing on them audiovisual homogenizing conventions.
