= Free Zone Film Festival =

Film festival in Serbia

- Official logo
- Location: Belgrade, Novi Sad, Nis in Serbia
- Founded: 2005
- Language: International
- Website: www.slobodnazona.rs

The Free Zone Film Festival (Serbian: Filmski festival Slobodna zona) is an annual film festival held in Serbia every year since 2005. Since 2013, the festival has been held simultaneously across three cities: Belgrade, Novi Sad and Nis. The opening ceremony is held at Sava Centar with thousands of spectators.

The Free Zone program shows an average of 30 to 40 feature films and documentaries, showcasing works from around the world that seek to address or respond to human rights issues, and supported by the Human Rights Film Network.

Over the years, the festival has collaborated with other festivals around the world, including Marseille Festival of Documentary Film, DokuFest from Prizren, Tempo dokumentärfestival in Sweden, This Human World festival in Vienna and Copenhagen International Documentary Film Festival.

The festival has been hosted by significant figures in the cinematography world, such as Mirjana Karanović, Miki Manojlović, Biljana Srbljanović, Veran Matić, Boris Buden, Dubravka Ugrešić and Olja Bećković.
