= School in the countryside =

Type of school in Cuba

A school in the countryside, originally called an "escuela en el campo" in Spanish, and officially titled an "Escuela Secundaria Básica en el Campo", was a type of school in Cuba, created in the 1970s for junior and senior high school students. These institutes were boarding schools in rural areas, where children went to focus on agricultural labor. Students were to spend half their scheduled day studying, and the other half working to grow crops. This education was intended to foster a love of work, collective projects, and a shared understanding between urban and rural Cubans. The schools were intended to be self-sufficient, using the crops grown by students for financial support, but this model often faltered, causing schools in the countryside to necessitate state funding.

The construction of schools in the countryside greatly expanded educational access for rural Cubans, who before the Cuban Revolution often had no access to education. However, during their operation, critics often claimed that the schools in the countryside disrupted parent-child relationships, subjected students to poor living conditions, and enabled ideological indoctrination.

After the Special Period, the schools in the countryside became increasingly difficult to maintain due to national economic shortages. Raul Castro announced in 2009, that the schools were all to be closed. All schools in the countryside were phased out by 2011.

== Background ==
=== New Cuban man ===
In August 1960, Che Guevara gave a speech in which he suggests that the only way for "the revolution" to succeed is by creating a "new man". In a variety of speeches made by Guevara from 1960 to 1965, Guevara continuously suggested at creating a new humanist-socialist citizen. After many public proclamations calling for the creation of a "new man", Guevara put his ideas into writing, publishing Socialism and man in Cuba in 1965. Guevara described this "new man" as embodying a deep self-sacrificing consciousness, and loyalty to "the revolution". Fidel Castro claimed that it was best to spread this consciousness through education, and turning Cuba into "one huge school".

The junior high class of 1971 was later designated to be the first generation educated in schools in the countryside, because as stated by Che Guevara in Socialism and Man in Cuba, this generation was the first born since the Triumph of the Revolution, and thus according to Guevara "free of original sin" and prototypes to be "new men".

The later establishment of schools in the countryside as full-time boarding schools was done with the intent to fully realize the development of Cuban "new men". By totally socializing children away from the home, educators could separate children from places were they could possibly be taught "pre-revolutionary values".

=== Economic decline ===
The decline of sugar production in Cuba in the early 1960s, created greater needs for economic production in Cuba. The schools to the countryside initiative was later developed with the intention of improving Cuba's economic output using student labor.

In the immediate years after the revolution, education professionals fled the country creating a shortage of teachers. The state-sponsored expansion of public education to serve the entire population also exacerbated the teacher shortage, since it put a strain on already drained educational resources.

=== Schools to the countryside ===
In 1965, the schools to the countryside (lit: "escuelas al campo'") program was established in Camagüey, and implemented nationally the following year. The program mandated that students spend 45 days a year in the countryside doing agricultural work. Around 20,000 students participated the first year, and 160,000 participated in 1968 during the Revolutionary Offensive.

Students were to spend time in the countryside with their original teachers, who come to continue to instruct classes. Days in the countryside usually began with students singing of the national anthem at 5:30 am, then breakfast, agricultural work from 7 am to 11 am, lunch until 1 pm, more agricultural work to 5 pm, recreation until 8:30 pm, then school work until 10 pm.

The schools to the countryside initiative is still active in Cuba, but by the end of the 1960s it was seen as inefficient due to the continued economic decline Cuba was facing, especially in agriculture. A total move for schools directly in the countryside was seen as a necessary step for better agricultural output, and academic achievement for rural Cubans.

== History ==
=== Implementation ===
Fifty schools in the countryside were founded in 1971, and by 1976, these schools accounted for 31% of total enrollment of 7th and 9th graders. Students spent half their scheduled day studying, and the other half working in agriculture, usually growing citrus. Schools paid the minimum wages for farm-work to the Ministry of Education, which in turn funded educational institutions. Enrollment at these boarding schools was allowed beginning at 7th grade. All families voluntarily applied for their children to attend.

Teenagers as young as 15 years old were sometimes used to act as junior high instructors at these schools, because Cuba was suffering a teacher shortage. Because schools in the countryside operated as boarding schools, teachers could intimately surveil their students, which had a positive impact on recorded academic achievement.

=== Decline ===
Since the inception of the schools in the countryside program, the schools were intended to be financially self-sufficient, but they were never able to be fully economically productive since their inception.

Following the economic crisis of the Special Period, the schools were seen as too costly, and began to be phased out, beginning in 2009. Currently, only a select few boarding schools still operate in Cuba, and all are specialty "vocational schools" for promising athletes, or other gifted students.

== See also ==
- Kibbutz communal child rearing and collective education
