= University of Arizona Museum of Art =

Art museum in Tucson, Arizona, United States

Coordinates: 32.2357°N 110.9559°W

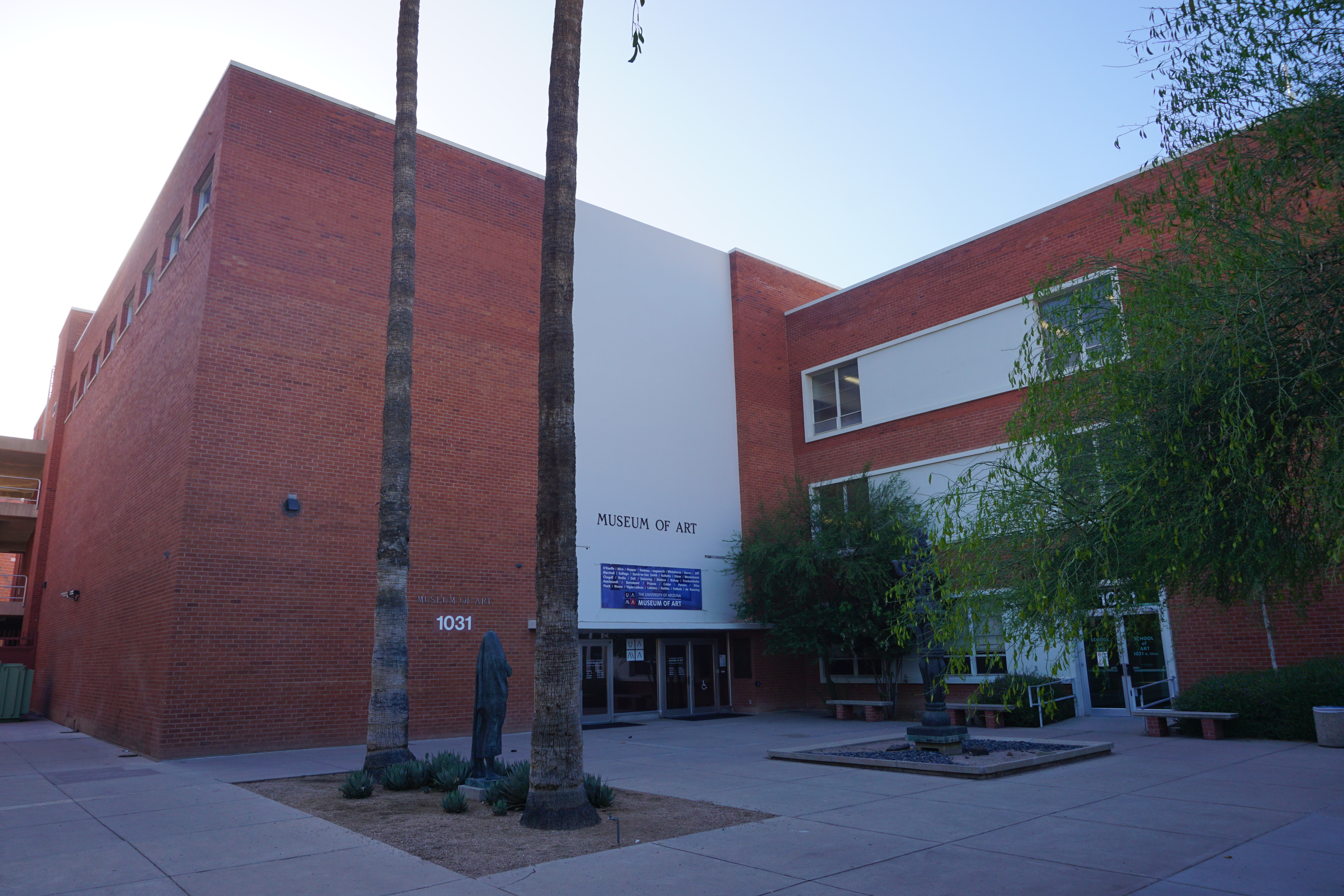
University of Arizona Museum of Art

The University of Arizona Museum of Art (UAMA) is an art museum in Tucson, Arizona, operated by the University of Arizona. The museum's permanent collection includes more than 6,000 works of art, including paintings, sculptures, prints and drawings with an emphasis on European and American fine art from the Renaissance to the present.

The museum is located on the UA's campus near Park Avenue and Speedway Boulevard. Admission is free to UA students, faculty, and staff with student ID. It is part of "the Museum Neighborhood," a cluster of four museums within walking distance of each other; the other three museums are the Center for Creative Photography, Arizona State Museum, and Arizona Historical Society (a non-UA institution located just off campus).

== History ==
A university gallery at the University of Arizona existed in the 1930s. In the 1930s, the Works Projects Administration, one of the New Deal agencies, donated 200 lithographs and prints created by artists that it supported. These works formed the core of the museum's initial collection of works.

In 1944, University of Arizona alumnus Charles Leonard Pfeiffer donated many American paintings. This was followed by the addition of the Samuel H. Kress Collection, a donation from the Samuel H. Kress Foundation, which originally comprised 50 European paintings, in the early 1950s. Museum director Peter Bermingham led the museum for over 20 years, from 1978 to 1998. During his tenure, the museum more than doubled its holdings. Peter Briggs, who had begun his work in the museum as curator of collections in 1990 under Bermingham, was promoted to chief curator, but his contract was not renewed in 2004.

On the day after Thanksgiving 1985, shortly after the museum opened, a woman distracted a guard on the museum's staircase while a man working with her cut Willem de Kooning's Woman-Ochre out of its frame and hid it under his coat while the two left. Guards realized immediately afterward that the painting had been stolen. It was found in 2017 by some Silver City, New Mexico, antique dealers, in the house of a woman who had died, and returned to the museum shortly afterwards. The museum is currently raising funds for its restoration.

== Collections ==
Among the museum's several different collections are:

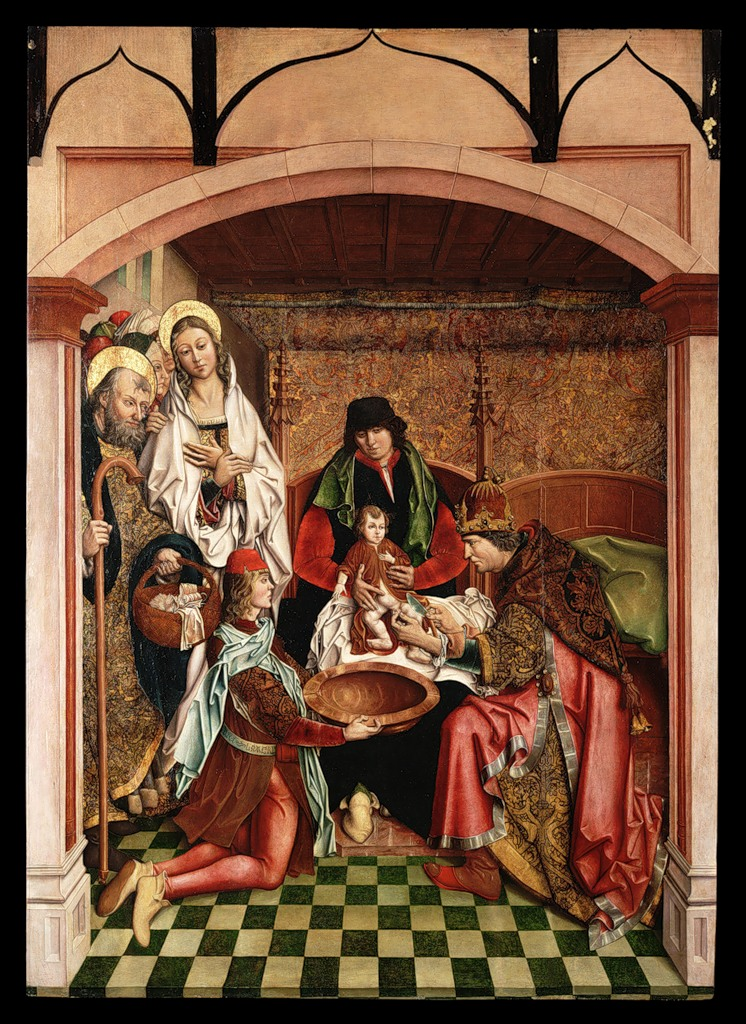
Circuncisión by Gallego, at the University of Arizona Museum of Art

- The Samuel H. Kress Collection, donated in the early 1950s. It consists of more than 60 European works from the 14th through 19th centuries, including the 26-panel Retablo of the Cathedral of the Ciudad Rodrigo by Fernando Gallego and Maestro Bartolomé. A retablo is a church altarpiece with a picture or relief on a religious subject. Arizona Public Media produced a one-hour documentary on the panels, which were originally from Ciudad Rodrigo and include depictions of the creation according to Genesis, the Life of Christ, and the Last Judgment, tracing the retablo through earthquakes, damage from the Napoleonic War, a trans-Atlantic voyage, and storage in a bunker during the Second World War. The panels are "considered by scholars to be some of the most beautiful and iconographical ambitious paintings of the 15th century." The collection was first revealed to the public during the three-day inauguration ceremony of University of Arizona President Richard A. Harvill, in 1951. The Kress collection also includes paintings by Jusepe de Ribera, Domenico Tintoretto, Giovanni Battista Tiepolo, Horace Vernet and Louise Élisabeth Vigée Le Brun. There are also Late Medieval and Renaissance paintings by Jacopo del Casentino, Taddeo di Bartolo, Niccolo Del Ser Sozzo Tegliacci, Francesco De Bosio Zaganelli, Vittore Crivelli, Guidiccio Cozzarelli, and Vittore Carpaccio.
- The C. Leonard Pfeiffer Collection, donated in 1944 by Charles Leonard Pfeiffer. It includes almost 100 American works from the early 20th century, including pieces by John French Sloan, Stuart Davis, Edward Hopper, Isabel Bishop, Jacob Lawrence, Reginald Marsh, John Steuart Curry, and Philip Evergood.
- The Edward J. Gallagher III Memorial Collection, which includes over 200 European and American works from the late 19th and 20th centuries. The collection was established in honor of Edward Gallagher Jr.'s son and includes sculptures by Auguste Rodin, Jean Arp, Aristide Maillol, Alexander Archipenko, Jacques Lipchitz, David Smith, Isamu Noguchi, Henry Moore, and Alexander Calder; abstract expressionist paintings by Morris Louis, Jackson Pollock, Mark Rothko, Franz Kline and Robert Motherwell; and works by Henri Matisse, Pablo Picasso, Salvador Dalí, Joan Miró, Fernand Léger, Marc Chagall, Emil Nolde, and Kurt Schwitters.
- The Robert Priseman Collection, which includes 71 paintings by the British artist Robert Priseman. The collection comprises 71 of the one hundred damaged religious icons Priseman purchased from eBay between 2011 - 2012 and over-painted with a 20th-century celebrity who died prematurely from suicide or as a result of a self-destructive lifestyle. The over-painting seeks to mimic the replacement in contemporary culture of faith with fame and of saints with ‘stars’, exploring Jarvis Cocker’s idea that people believe fame is a kind of heaven that can “sort things out”, focusing on those amongst the celebrated who are troubled and at times unable to cope with the pressures of modern living. Fame The series was originally exhibited at Art Exchange, Colchester, England in 2013, WhiteBox Art Center, New York in 2014 and St Marylebone Crypt, London in 2015. Portraits held in the UAMA Collection include Virginia Woolf, Amy Winehouse, Frida Kahlo, Billie Holiday, Diane Arbus, Richard Gerstl, Marilyn Monroe, Hunter S. Thompson, Ernest Hemingway and Jean-Michel Basquiat. The balance of portraits from this project are held in the collections of Honolulu Museum of Art, MOMA Wales, Mabee-Gerrer Museum of Art, Wayne State University Art Collection, Michigan, UMMA, Michigan, The Dennos Museum Center, Michigan and The Allen Memorial Art Museum, Michigan.
- The Jacques and Yulla Lipchitz Collection: Sketches and Models, which features Jacques Lipchitz and includes 60 plaster and clay models, tools from his studio, and several portrait busts and full sculptures. The works range from 1911 to 1971. Yulla Lipchitz, Jacques' widow, donated the collection to the museum in 1980.

The expansion of the museum's permanent collection of the museum is funded by the Edward J. Gallagher, Jr. Memorial Bequest, an endowment which has funded museum acquisitions since 1980. The endowment has led to the acquisition of over a thousand pieces, including works by Honoré Daumier, James Abbott McNeill Whistler, José Posada, Käthe Kollwitz, Frank Stella, Richard Diebenkorn, Helen Frankenthaler, Roy Lichtenstein, Robert Rauschenberg, Elizabeth Catlett, and Robert Colescott.

The research arm of the museum is the Archive of Visual Arts (AVA). The archive received its first major contribution with Robert McCall's gift of over 200 paintings and drawings to the museum. The gift was announced in 2007 by McCall, who estimated the value of the works to be between $2.5 million and $3 million. Among the donated McCall pieces of space art are Mars Outpost and Mars Metropolis.
