= Benoît Bringer =

French journalist

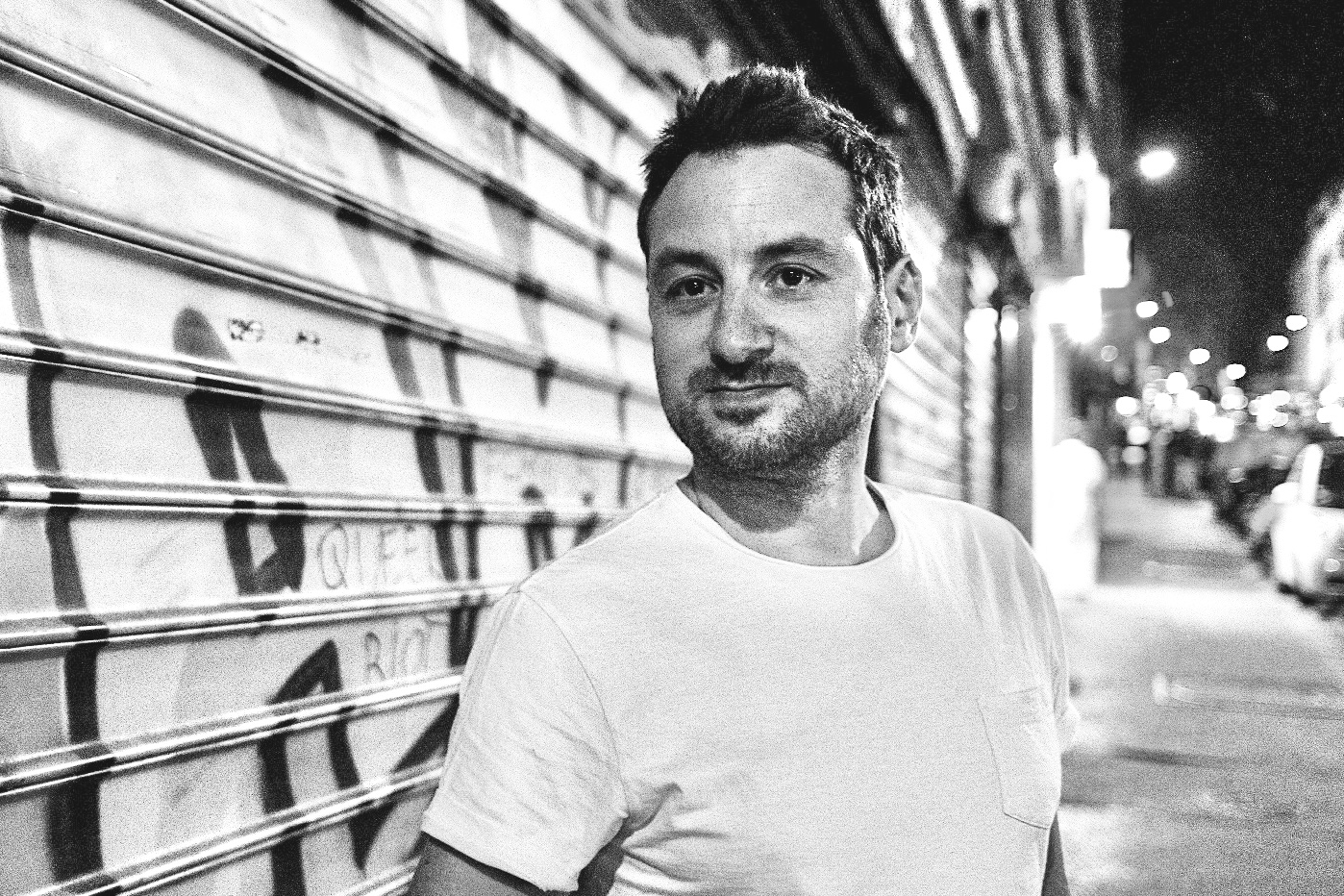
Benoit Bringer

Benoît Bringer (born 1979) is a French filmmaker, author and former reporter and investigative journalist. Among others, his documentaries have been selected in festivals such as the Hotdocs in Canada, DOC NYC and Palm Spring Film Festival in USA, Raindance Film Festival in UK, CPH:DOX in Denmark, Thessaloniki Film Festival in Greece or the french leading documentary festival FIPADOC. In a highly cinematic style, his films tell inspiring, often intimate stories.

His latest documentary series MH370, Missing was lauded by critics and premiered at the 2024 FIPADOC International Festival before being released by France.tv. The French leading radio France Inter hailed the film as “moving and fascinating”.

His film The Caviar Connection from Arte premiered at 2022 Hotdocs in Toronto. It was called “an eminent piece of investigative journalism” by CPH:DOX and “a nail-biting thriller” by The Palm Spring Film Festival where it won the Best documentary Special Mention Award. Among other prizes, The Caviar Connection also received The Political Film Of The Year Award 2022 at Cinema for Peace Awards.

Bringer also directed The Rise Of Wagner a two part Arte documentary which premiered at 2023 Hotdocs in Toronto. Variety commended the film as “a potent doc study” while Télérama prestigious French magazine call it “an outstanding and fascinating documentary”.

Bringer previously directed The Men Who Stole The World, which was nominated for Best Documentary of 2019 at the prestigious Prix Europa, and The Carnivore’s Dilemma which won the 2019 Autrement vu Award at FIGRA French festival and the 2018 Environmental Price at Nature Namur International Festival. Télérama called The Carnivore’s Dilemma “an eye-opening documentary”.

His film Primaire au PS : l'improbable scénario, a 90-minute documentary about the first political primary race in France, which aired on Canal+, was selected for FIPA, the Festival International de Programmes Audiovisuels, held in Biarritz, France.

As an investigative journalist, he is a member of the International Consortium of Investigative Journalists (ICIJ) team that received the Pulitzer Prize for the Panama Papers investigation. He has been shortlisted as International Journalist of the year 2017 by One World Media.

Before becoming an independent filmmaker, he was a correspondent in Pakistan and Afghanistan for the French public radios France Inter, France Info, RFI and the French-German public TV channel Arte.

Benoît Bringer graduated from ESJ (École supérieure de journalisme de Lille). He started his career as a reporter for the French public broadcaster France 2.
