= Rae Yang =

Chinese-American writer

Rae Yang (Chinese: 杨瑞; pinyin: Yáng Ruì, born December 1, 1950) is a Chinese-American professor emerita and writer. Her book, Spider Eaters, chronicles her experience during the Cultural Revolution.

== Early life ==
Yang was born in 1950 shortly after the establishment of the People's Republic of China. Her parents were enthusiastic followers of Mao Zedong, having joined the Chinese Communist Party in the 1940s. When she was one year old Yang moved with her parents to Switzerland, where her parents served at the Chinese Consulate. During this time she grew to have a close relationship with her nanny "Aunty", who lived with Yang's family in Geneva and provided her with the parental love and care while her parents were away. Yang later returned with her family to China to attend Beijing 101 Middle School. During this time Yang was an enthusiastic follower of Mao and eventually joined the Red Guards during the Cultural Revolution. She became disillusioned by the movement after being sent to the countryside where she had gruelingly worked in peasant conditions on a pig farm in Cold Springs, a life in which she was not accustomed. After three years on the farm, Yang returned home to find her parents "had both changed literally beyond recognition." After these experiences, Yang began to question the Cultural Revolution as she felt deceived by the political struggle for power.

Leaving Cold Springs left Yang without a valid hukou, which meant she lived as an undocumented resident in her own country. Yang had to return to the countryside to bribe an official with "Big China brand cigarettes and Maotai brand baijiu" to grant her a hukou, before moving to Shijiazhuang to return to her studies. After gaining permanent residence in Beijing, Yang was accepted into the Chinese Academy of Social Sciences, majoring in journalism. In 1981, Yang was accepted into the University of Massachusetts in the United States, studying comparative literature.

== Career ==
Yang became an associate professor, later the Professor of Chinese Language and Literature, at Dickinson College in Pennsylvania. In 1997, she published a memoir about her experience in the Cultural Revolution, Spider Eaters, the title a reference to a quote by Chinese writer Lu Xun: "Since someone ate crabs, others must have eaten spiders as well. However, they were not tasty. So afterwards, people stopped eating them. These people also deserve our heartfelt gratitude." The experience of her generation, the "spider eaters" of her book, would therefore serve as a warning to the later generation not to repeat the same thing. The work chronicles her role as both a victimizer as well as a victim in the Cultural Revolution, and won praise from the critics.

== Bibliography ==
- Reflections and Recollections (1989)
- Spider Eaters (1997)
- China: Fifty Years Inside the People's Republic (1999, photographic catalog)

== See also ==
- Scar literature
- Sent-down youth
