= Micha Bar-Am =

German-born Israeli photojournalist

Micha Bar-Am מיכה בר-עם
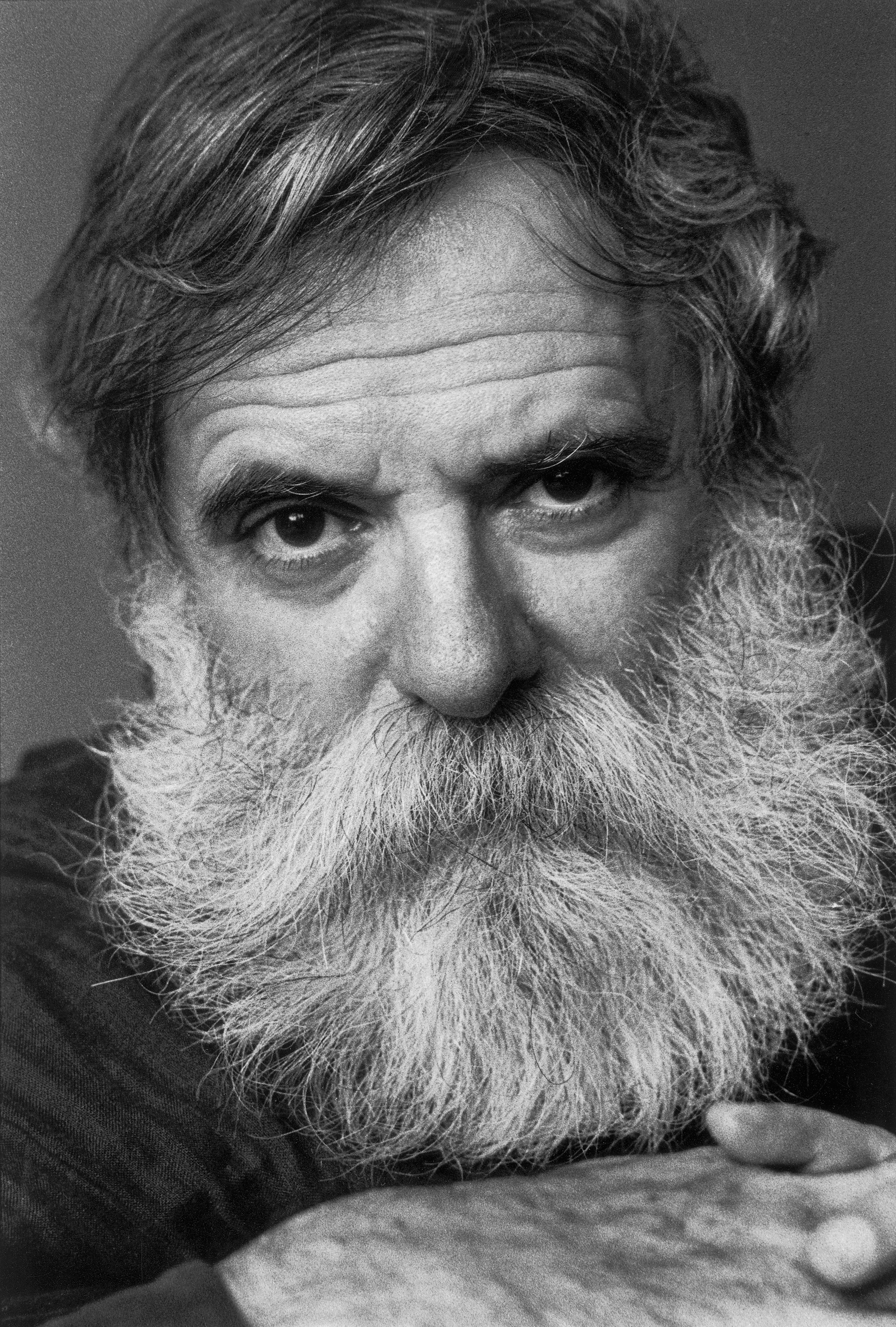
- Born: 1930 (age 95–96); Germany
- Known for: Photography, photojournalism
- Awards: Israel Prize

Micha Bar-Am (Hebrew: מיכה בר-עם; born 1930) is a German-born Israeli photographer.

== Biography ==
Micha Bar-Am is one of Israel's most senior photographers. For more than sixty years his photographs have played a central role in the construction of Israel's cultural memory, and have presented the country's image to the entire world. Born in Berlin 1930, Micha Bar-Am arrived with his family in Israel (then Palestine) in 1936, and grew up in Haifa. He worked at the port of Haifa and joined the Palmach Harel Brigade during Israel's War of Independence.

He was a founding member of Malkia kibbutz on the Lebanese border. In the early 1950s, he participated in archeological expeditions in the Galilee and later in the search for scrolls in the Judean Desert, also, at that time, he began to photograph his surroundings and neighbors. In 1957 became a civilian photojournalist for Bamahane magazine, a Hebrew-language weekly magazine published by the Israel Defense Forces. In that capacity he documented Israel's formative years - immigration, war, and events of public interest. He conducted photographic journeys through West Africa and Asia. In 1961 he was chosen to take part of the limited team who documented the Eichmann trail. In 1967 covered the Six Day War and his photographs were published worldwide, following which he was invited to join the international prestigious photographers collective Magnum Photos.

From 1968 to 1992 was the regional photographer for The New York Times. In 1974, he became a founding member of the International Center of Photography (ICP) in New York. In 1977 was asked by director Marc Scheps to establish the Department of Photography at the Tel Aviv Museum of Art, the first of its kind in Israel. He headed the department until 1992 and curated many exhibitions of Israeli and international photographers.

In 1985 he was granted Fulbright and Nieman fellowships at Harvard University. In 2000 he received the Israel Prize for Visual Arts.

Bar-Am has had numerous exhibitions in Israel and around the world. His photographs have been published in many books and countless articles about his work have been published worldwide. He is an honorary citizen of Ramat Gan and Los Angeles.

He is married to Orna, an artist. Their sons are Ahuvia (a classical philologist), Barak (an artist), and Nimrod (a philosopher). He lives in Ramat Gan.

== Photography career ==
In the early 1940s, Bar-Am started taking pictures of life on a kibbutz; he used borrowed cameras until he bought a Leica. After his military service, he began photographing more seriously.

After publishing his first book, Across Sinai (1957), Bar-Am gained work as a press photographer and in the editorial staff of the Israeli Army magazine, Ba-Mahaneh, from 1957 to 1967. In 1961 he covered the Eichmann trial.

In 1967 he covered the Six-Day War, during which time he met Cornell Capa. Many of his war images brought him renown. Since 1968, he has been a correspondent for Magnum Photos. In 1974 he helped Capa found the International Center of Photography in New York City.

In 1968, Bar-Am also became the photographic correspondent from Israel for The New York Times, a position he held until 1992. From 1977 to 1992, he was head of the department of photography at the Tel Aviv Museum of Art.

He continues to work on his photography. He writes about his work:

I keep my internal eye open for that other, metaphorical image that transcends illustration to achieve a wholeness of its own. I strive for the elusive entity that is both evidence and evocation, public record and personal vision.

He says that he has adopted Robert Capa's saying, "If your photographs aren't good enough, you weren't close enough," but has added a caveat:

If you're too close you lose perspective. It is not easy to be fair with the facts and keep your own convictions out of the picture. It is almost impossible to be both a participant in the events and their observer, witness, interpreter. The effort brings great frustration, and equally great reward.

== Awards and recognition ==
- 1985: Fulbright Grant
- 1985: Golden Flamingo Award for Photographic Poster, Arles, France
- 1985: IBM Fellowship, Aspen, Colorado, USA
- 1985-86: Nieman Fellow, Harvard University, Cambridge, Massachusetts, USA
- 1993: Enrique Kavlin Prize, Israel Museum, Jerusalem, Israel
- 2000: Israel Prize for photography

== Publications ==
- Across Sinai. Israel: Hakibbutz Hameuhad, 1957.
- Portrait of Israel. USA: New York Times/American Heritage, 1970.
- The Jordan. Israel: Massada, 1981.
- Jewish Sites in Lebanon. USA: Moreshet Erets-Yisrael/Ariel, 1984.
- Painting With Light: The Photographic Aspect in the Work of E.M. Lilian. Israel: Tel Aviv Museum of Art/Dvir, 1991.
- The Last War. Israel: Keter, 1996.
- Israel: A Photobiography. USA: Simon & Schuster, 1998.
- Insight: Micha Bar-Am's Israel. London: Koenig / Israel: Open Museums, 2011.
- Southward: Micha Bar-Am, Photographs. Israel: The Negev Museum of Art, 2013.

== See also ==
- List of Israel Prize recipients
- Visual arts in Israel
- Israeli journalism
