= Allison Otto =

American documentary director

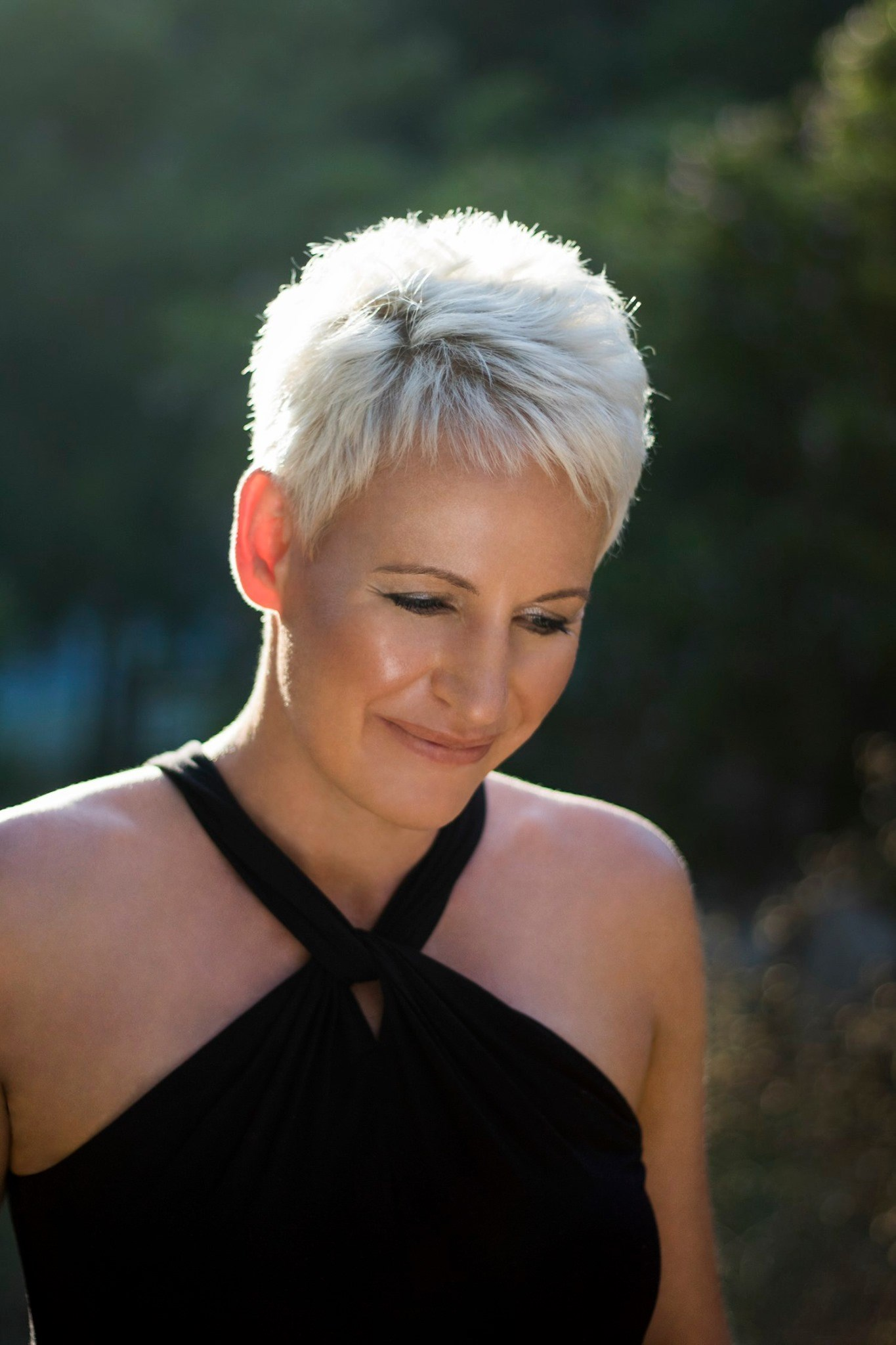
- Occupations: Director; producer; cinematographer

Allison Otto is an Emmy-winning American documentary film director. She is best known for her work on The Thief Collector, The Love Bugs, and Keeper of the Mountains.

== Career ==
Allison Otto graduated from Stanford University with a Bachelor's degree in Communications and a Master's degree in Sociology. Her first feature film, The Thief Collector, premiered in the Documentary Feature Competition at the 2022 South by Southwest film festival. The film was nominated in 2023 for a Critics Choice Documentary Award for Best First Documentary Feature and for Best True Crime Documentary.

In 2019, Allison released The Love Bugs, which she co-directed with Maria Clinton. The film won an Emmy for Outstanding Short Documentary in 2021.The Love Bugs won awards at 14 film festivals and was featured on POV Shorts Season 3. It was shortlisted by the International Documentary Association for the 2019 Best Documentary Short award and was selected as part of the American Film Showcase (also known as the American Film Program). She is also a two-time recipient of the Mountainfilm Commitment Grant and the recipient of the SFFILM Catapult Film Fellowship in 2019.

== Filmography ==
Year	Title	Contribution	Note
2022	The Thief Collector	Director	
2019	The Love Bugs	Co-director, co-producer and cinematographer	
2018	Felix	Director	
2016	Property	Director	
2013	Keeper of the Mountains	Director and cinematographer	

== Awards and nominations ==
Year	Result	Award	Category	Work	Ref.
2021	Won	News & Documentary Emmy Awards	Outstanding Short Documentary	The Love Bugs	
2021	Nominated	News & Documentary Emmy Awards	Outstanding Music Composition	The Love Bugs	
