= Biographers International Organization =

Organization

- The BIO logo
- Formation: 2010
- Type: 501(c)3 organization
- Purpose: BIO promotes the art and craft of biography, and furthers the professional interests of its practitioners.
- Headquarters: Santa Fe, NM
- Region served: International
- Members: 600+ members globally
- Founder: James McGrath Morris
- President: Steve Paul
- Executive Director: Michael Gately
- Website: www.biographersinternational.org

Biographers International Organization (BIO) is an international, non-profit, 501(c)(3) organization founded to promote the art and craft of biography, and to further the professional interests of its practitioners. The organization was founded in 2010 by a committee of noted biographers, led by James McGrath Morris, who served as BIO's first Executive Director. The president of BIO as of 2024 is Steve Paul. The executive director as of 2020 is Michael Gately.

Each year, the organization presents its highest award, the BIO Award, to an individual who has made notable contributions to advancing the art and craft of biography. BIO's annual Plutarch Award is presented to the best biography of the year, as determined by a panel of noted biographers.

== Mission ==
BIO aims to promote the art and craft of biography, cultivate a diverse community of biographers, encourage public interest in biography, and provide educational and fellowship opportunities that support the work of biographers worldwide.

BIO fulfills its mission by:

- hosting the annual BIO Conference which presents inspiring speakers, opportunities for networking, and instruction about researching, writing, publishing, and marketing biographical work
- hosting additional in-person and online events that encourage biographers to learn from and engage with one another
- publishing a monthly members' newsletter, The Biographer's Craft, which includes news, in-depth features, and advice pertaining to biography
- supporting aspiring and practicing biographers with prizes and fellowships
- honoring outstanding biographers, editors, and librarians with awards
- offering a coaching program in which members receive personalized advice from experienced biographers
- publishing a quarterly newsletter to inform the media and publishing world about BIO's activities and general news related to biography

== History ==
BIO was granted its corporate charter on May 26, 2010, as a 501 (c) 6. On December 27, 2019, BIO became a 501 (c) 3.

BIO grew from the vision of biographer James McGrath Morris, creator and editor of The Biographer's Craft newsletter. In July 2008, Morris wrote an open letter to biographers, from which a grass-roots organization of practicing and apprentice biographers began to emerge. On March 26, 2009, the first formal organizing meeting took place at the Leon Levy Center for Biography at CUNY, and a temporary 15-member founding committee was formed to function as an Interim Board of Directors.

In February 2010, the Interim Board announced the formation of an Advisory Council composed of leading and noted biographers and agents. The current Advisory Council includes Debby Applegate, Taylor Branch, Robert Caro, Ron Chernow, Tim Duggan, John A. Farrell, Caroline Fraser, Michael Holroyd, Peniel Joseph, Hermione Lee, Andrew Lownie, Megan Marshall, John Matteson, Jon Meacham, Candice Millard, James McGrath Morris, Andrew Morton, Hans Renders, Stacy Schiff, Gayfryd Steinberg, T. J. Stiles, Rachel L. Swarns, William Taubman, and Claire Tomalin.

BIO convened its first conference in May 2010, at the University of Massachusetts Boston. It has since held its conference annually, at various locations in the United States, including Washington, D.C., New York City, and Los Angeles.

In 2013, the BIO Board created the Plutarch Award, the first international literary award to be presented by biographers for the year's best biography. Initially selected by a vote of the membership, the Plutarch is now selected by a committee of noted biographers from a list of ten finalists. The winning biography is announced at the annual BIO Conference.

== Awards ==
Each year, BIO presents several awards to honor biographers, editors, librarians and archivists, and their work.

- BIO Award: Since 2010, the BIO Award has been presented to an individual who has "made a significant contribution to the art and craft of biography."
- Biblio Award: Created in 2012, the Biblio Award is presented to an outstanding librarian or archivist. Awardees are selected by the BIO Board of Directors, from nominations submitted by BIO members.
- Editorial Excellence: Beginning in 2014, the BIO Award for Editorial Excellence has been presented to an outstanding editor of biography.
- Frances "Frank" Rollin Fellowship for African American Biography: Established in 2020, the annual Rollin Fellowship is named for Frances Rollin Whipper, the first known African American biographer, and is awarded to promote biographies of African American lives.
- Hazel Rowley Prize: Starting in 2014, the Rowley Prize is awarded annually for the best proposal by a first-time biographer. Winners receive a cash prize and the winning proposal is reviewed by an established literary agent.
- Plutarch Award: Since 2013, the Plutarch Award has been presented for the best biography of the year. The Plutarch is named for the Greek historian who is credited as the father of biography.
- Robert and Ina Caro Travel/Research Fellowship: In 2017 BIO established an annual research and travel fellowship to support the travel of one or two biographers. The Fellowship is named in honor of Robert Caro and Ina Caro, whose work demonstrates the crucial importance of a sense of place in delineating character.

Year	BIO Award	Biblio Award	Plutarch Award	Editorial Excellence
2010	Jean Strouse			
2011	Robert Caro			
2012	Arnold Rampersad	Edward Comstock, University of Southern California		
2013	Ron Chernow	David Smith, New York Public Library	Robert Caro, The Passage of Power	
2014	Stacy Schiff	Wallace Dailey and Heather Cole, Curators Theodore Roosevelt Collection, Harvard University	Linda Leavell, Holding On Upside Down: The Life and Work of Marianne Moore	Robert Gottlieb
2015	Taylor Branch	Thomas Mann, Library of Congress	Hermione Lee, Penelope Fitzgerald: A Life	Jonathan Segal
2016	Claire Tomalin	Dave Grabarek, Library of Virginia	Rosemary Sullivan, Stalin’s Daughter: The Extraordinary and Tumultuous Life of Svetlana Alliluyeva	Nan A. Talese
2017	Candice Millard	Karen Alder Abramson & Staff John F. Kennedy Presidential Library and Museum	Ruth Franklin, Shirley Jackson: A Rather Haunted Life	Robert Weil
2018	Richard Holmes	Michael T. Ryan, VP & Director Patricia J. Klingenstein Library, New-York Historical Society	Caroline Fraser, Prairie Fires: The American Dreams of Laura Ingalls Wilder	Tim Duggan
2019	James McGrath Morris	Nancy Kuhl, Curator of Poetry Yale Collection of American Literature, Beinecke Library	David W. Blight, Frederick Douglass: Prophet of Freedom	Ileene Smith
2020	Hermione Lee	(No award presented due to COVID-19)	Sonia Purnell, A Woman of No Importance: The Untold Story of the American Spy Who Helped Win World War II	Gayatri Patnaik
2021	David Levering Lewis	Jeff Flannery, Reference and Reader Services Section in the Manuscript Division of the Library of Congress	A. N. Wilson, The Mystery of Charles Dickens	Bob Bender
2022	Megan Marshall	Claudia Anderson, The LBJ Presidential Library	Frances Wilson, Burning Man: The Trials of D. H. Lawrence.	Gerald Howard
2023	Kitty Kelley	David Ferriero, Archivist of the United States	Jennifer Homans, Mr. B: George Balanchine’s 20th Century.	Michael Korda
2024	Kai Bird	Stephen Enniss, Harry Ransom Center	Yepoka Yeebo, Anansi’s Gold: The Man Who Looted the West, Outfoxed Washington, and Swindled the World.	
2025	Dawn Porter		Cynthia Carr, Candy Darling: Dreamer, Icon, Superstar and Lucy Hughes-Hallett, The Scapegoat: The Brilliant Brief Life of the Duke of Buckingham.	
2026	T. J. Stiles			

== Publications ==
The Biographer's Craft is a monthly online newsletter that active BIO members receive as part of their membership. TBC features original, non-fiction articles of general interest to biographers, writers, and readers of biography. Regular features include interviews with notable biographers, and a listing of biographies sold to publishers, as well as biographies published each month. BIO also publishes a quarterly online newsletter that promotes biography and the organization to members of the publishing community.

The current editor of The Biographer's Craft is Jared Stearns.

== Leadership ==
At the first conference in Boston on May 15, 2010, Nigel Hamilton was chosen to assume the presidency, succeeding Debby Applegate, who had served as interim president. Charles J. Shields was elected vice president, and eleven others were selected to serve one- to two-year terms on the board. In its first actions, the board selected James McGrath Morris to serve as executive director.

Since 2010, BIO's president and vice president have been elected biennially by BIO members. Its Board of Directors are broken into two groups, each of which are also elected biennially. The current Board is composed of 15 members, including the president and vice president.

Term	President	Vice President
2009	Debby Applegate (interim)	None
2010–2012	Nigel Hamilton	Charles J. Shields
2012–2014	James McGrath Morris	Brian Jay Jones
2014–2016	Brian Jay Jones	Cathy Curtis
2016–2018	Will Swift	Deirdre David
2018–2019	Cathy Curtis	Deirdre David
2019–2020	Linda Leavell	Karin Roffman
2020–2024	Linda Leavell	Sarah S. Kilborne
2024–2025	Steve Paul	Heather Clark

== Membership ==
BIO offers varying levels of membership, depending on a member's professional status. BIO is open to professional, amateur, and aspiring biographers and documentarians around the world.

== Notable members ==
- Debby Applegate (2007 Pulitzer Prize for Biography for The Most Famous Man in America: The Biography of Henry Ward Beecher)
- Robert Caro (1975 Pulitzer Prize for Biography for The Power Broker; 2002 National Book Award, 2003 Pulitzer Prize for Biography for Master of the Senate: The Years of Lyndon Johnson)
- Ron Chernow (2011 Pulitzer Prize for Biography for Washington: A Life, 1990 National Book Award for The House of Morgan: An American Banking Dynasty and the Rise of Modern Finance)
- Nigel Hamilton (Whitbread Award for Biography, Templar Medal for Military History for Monty, official three-volume biography of Field Marshal Montgomery)
- David Levering Lewis (1994 Pulitzer Prize for Biography for W. E. B. Du Bois: Biography of a Race, 1868-1919, 2001 Pulitzer Prize for Biography for W. E. B. Du Bois, 1919-1963: The Fight for Equality and the American Century)
- Megan Marshall (2006 Finalist for the Pulitzer Prize, for The Peabody Sisters: Three Women Who Ignited American Romanticism, 2016 Pulitzer Prize for Biography or Autobiography, for Margaret Fuller: A New American Life)
- Arnold Rampersad (1986 Finalist for the Pulitzer Prize, for Volume I of Life of Langston Hughes, 2007 Finalist for the National Book Award, for Ralph Ellison: A Biography)
- Stacy Schiff (2000 Pulitzer Prize for Biography, for Vera: Mrs. Vladimir Nabokov)
