= The 272 =

200-year story of enslaved families

The 272: The Families Who were Enslaved and Sold to Build The American Catholic Church
- 2023 Book jacket
- Author: Rachel L. Swarns
- Audio read by: Karen Murray
- Subject: Catholic Church; Georgetown University History; Jesuits United States; Racism United States; Social science/slavery; Slavery Maryland
- Genre: nonfiction
- Published: 2023
- Publisher: Random House
- Publication place: United States
- Media type: Print, E-book, Audio
- Pages: 352
- Awards: See Accolades
- ISBN: 9780399590863
- OCLC: 1354504740
- Website: Official website

The 272: The Families Who were Enslaved and Sold to Build The American Catholic Church is a nonfiction book written by Rachel L. Swarns and released on June 13, 2023, by Random House. It covers the history of and intersection of the author's family with the 1838 Jesuit slave sale.

== Synopsis ==
In 1838, prominent Catholic leaders of the Jesuits Order sold 272 enslaved people to fund Georgetown University. The book chronicles the history behind this event by following an enslaved family for almost 200 years. This book also shows how the Catholic Church in the United States depended on slave labor to run its institutions and grow its influence.

== Accolades ==
Chosen as a notable book of the year by The New York Times, in the nonfiction category. Also, chosen as a best book of year by The New Yorker and The Washington Post.

== See also ==
- 1838 Jesuit slave sale
- History of slavery in Maryland
