= Robert Caro =

American journalist and author (born 1935)

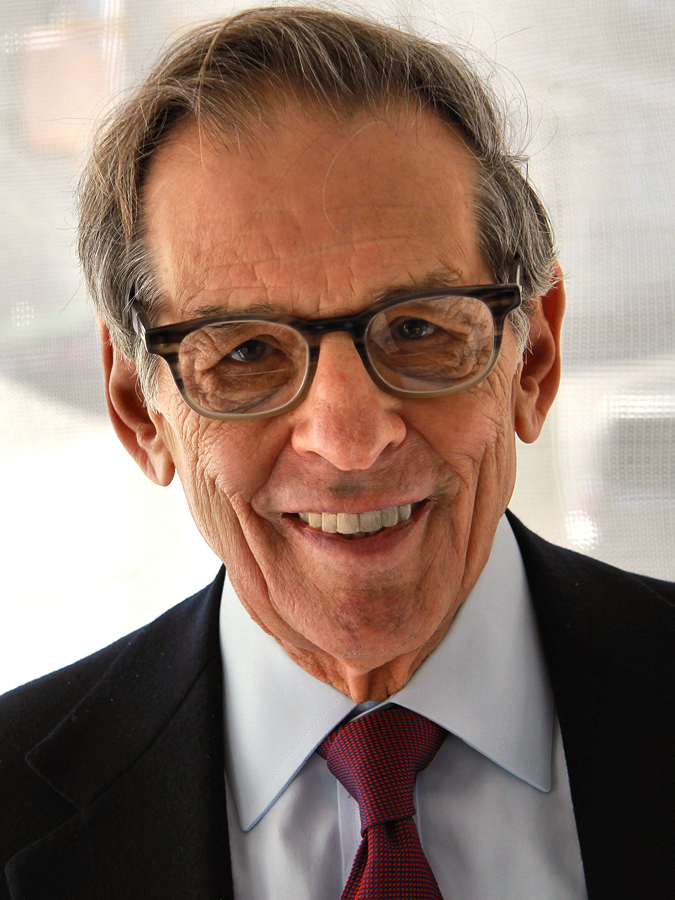
- Caro at the 2012 Texas Book Festival
- Born: Robert Allan Caro; October 30, 1935 (age 91); New York City, U.S.
- Education: Princeton University (BA)
- Occupation: Biographer
- Spouse: Ina Sloshberg (m. 1957)
- Children: 1
- Writing career
- Notable works: The Power Broker; The Years of Lyndon Johnson

Robert Allan Caro (born October 30, 1935) is an American journalist and author known for his biographies of United States public figures Robert Moses and Lyndon B. Johnson.

After working for many years as a reporter, Caro wrote The Power Broker (1974), a biography of New York urban planner Robert Moses, which was chosen by the Modern Library as one of the 100 Greatest Nonfiction Books of the Twentieth Century. He has since written four of a planned five volumes of The Years of Lyndon Johnson (1982, 1990, 2002, 2012), a biography of the former president. Alex Shephard, a staff writer at The New Republic, described Caro as "the most influential biographer of the last century".

For his biographies, Caro has won two Pulitzer Prizes in Biography, two National Book Awards (including one for Lifetime Achievement), the Francis Parkman Prize, three National Book Critics Circle Awards, the Mencken Award for Best Book, the Carr P. Collins Award from the Texas Institute of Letters, the D. B. Hardeman Prize, and a Gold Medal in Biography from the American Academy of Arts and Letters. In 2010 President Barack Obama awarded Caro the National Humanities Medal.

Due to Caro's reputation for exhaustive research and detail, he is sometimes invoked by reviewers of other writers who are called "Caro-esque" for their own extensive research.

== Life and career ==
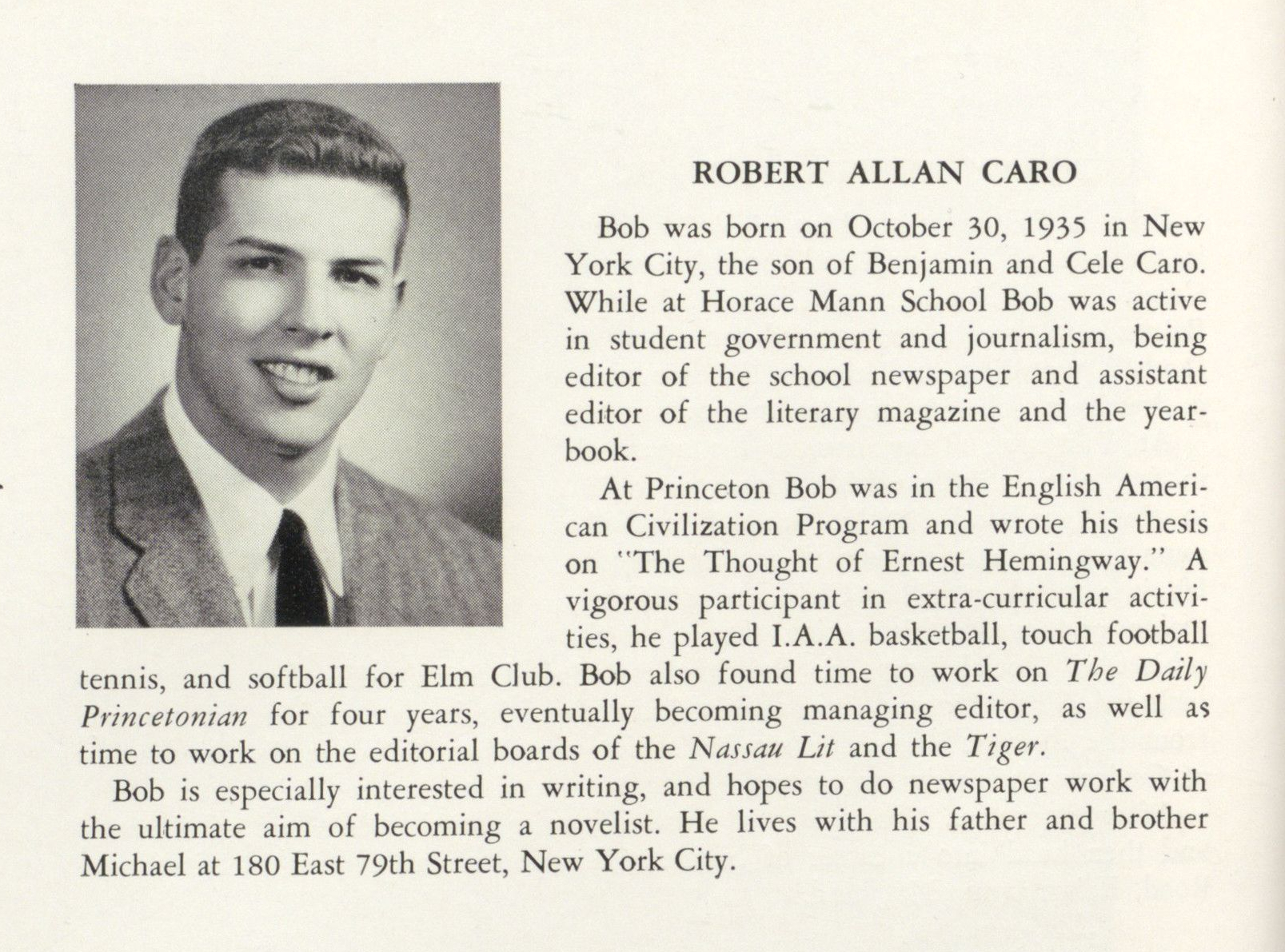
Caro in the Princeton University yearbook, 1957

Caro was born in New York City, the son of Jewish parents Celia (née Mendelow), born in New York, and Benjamin Caro, born in Warsaw, Poland. He grew up on Central Park West at 94th Street. His father, a businessman, spoke Yiddish as well as English, but he did not speak either very often. He was "very silent," Caro said, and became more so after Caro's mother died, after a long illness, when Robert was 11. It was his mother's deathbed wish that he should go to the Horace Mann School, an exclusive private school in the Riverdale section of The Bronx. As a student there, Caro translated an edition of his school newspaper into Russian and mailed 10,000 copies to students in the USSR. Graduating in 1953, he went on to Princeton University, where he majored in English. He became managing editor of The Daily Princetonian, second to Johnny Apple, later a prominent editor at The New York Times.

His writings, both in class and out, had been lengthy since his years at Horace Mann. A short story he wrote for The Princeton Tiger, the school's humor magazine, took up almost an entire issue. His 235-page long senior thesis on existentialism in Hemingway, titled "Heading Out: A Study of the Development of Ernest Hemingway's Thought", was so long, Caro claims, that the university's English department subsequently established a maximum length for senior theses by its students, named "the Caro rule". He graduated cum laude in 1957.

According to a 2012 New York Times Magazine profile, "Caro said he now thinks that Princeton, which he chose because of its parties, was one of his mistakes, and that he should have gone to Harvard. Princeton in the mid-1950s was hardly known for being hospitable towards the Jewish community, and though Caro says he did not personally suffer from antisemitism, he saw plenty of students who did." He had a sports column in the Princetonian and also wrote for the Princeton Tiger humor magazine.

Caro began his professional career as a reporter with the New Brunswick Daily Home News, now merged into the Home News Tribune, in New Jersey. He took a brief leave to work as a publicist for the Middlesex County Democratic Party. He stopped working with the party after an incident where he observed the party chair's complacence about racist police violence. While accompanying the party chair to polling places on election day, Caro saw police roughly arresting and loading black poll watchers into a police van. As Caro stated in a 2012 Times Magazine profile: "One of the cops explained that the black poll watchers had been giving them some trouble, but they had it under control. I still think about it. It wasn't the roughness of the police that made such an impression. It was the – meekness isn't the right word – the acceptance of those people [the political party officials] of what was happening."

After briefly enrolling in the English doctoral program at Rutgers University, where he served as a teaching assistant, he spent six years as an investigative reporter with the Long Island newspaper Newsday. An early article, "Anatomy of a $9 Burglary," investigating the lives of those affected by a theft of $9 from a Long Island home, was held by The New York Times as a strong example of Caro's ceaseless research process to uncover the deep truth behind a story. One of the articles he wrote was a long series about why a proposed bridge across Long Island Sound from Rye to Oyster Bay, championed by Robert Moses, would have been inadvisable, requiring piers so large it would disrupt tidal flows in the sound, amongst other problems. Caro believed that his work had influenced even the state's powerful governor Nelson Rockefeller to reconsider the idea, until he saw the state's Assembly vote overwhelmingly to pass a preliminary measure for the bridge.

"That was one of the transformational moments of my life," Caro said years later. It led him to think about Moses for the first time. "I got in the car and drove home to Long Island, and I kept thinking to myself: 'Everything you've been doing is baloney. You've been writing under the belief that power in a democracy comes from the ballot box. But here's a guy who has never been elected to anything, who has enough power to turn the entire state around, and you don't have the slightest idea how he got it.'"

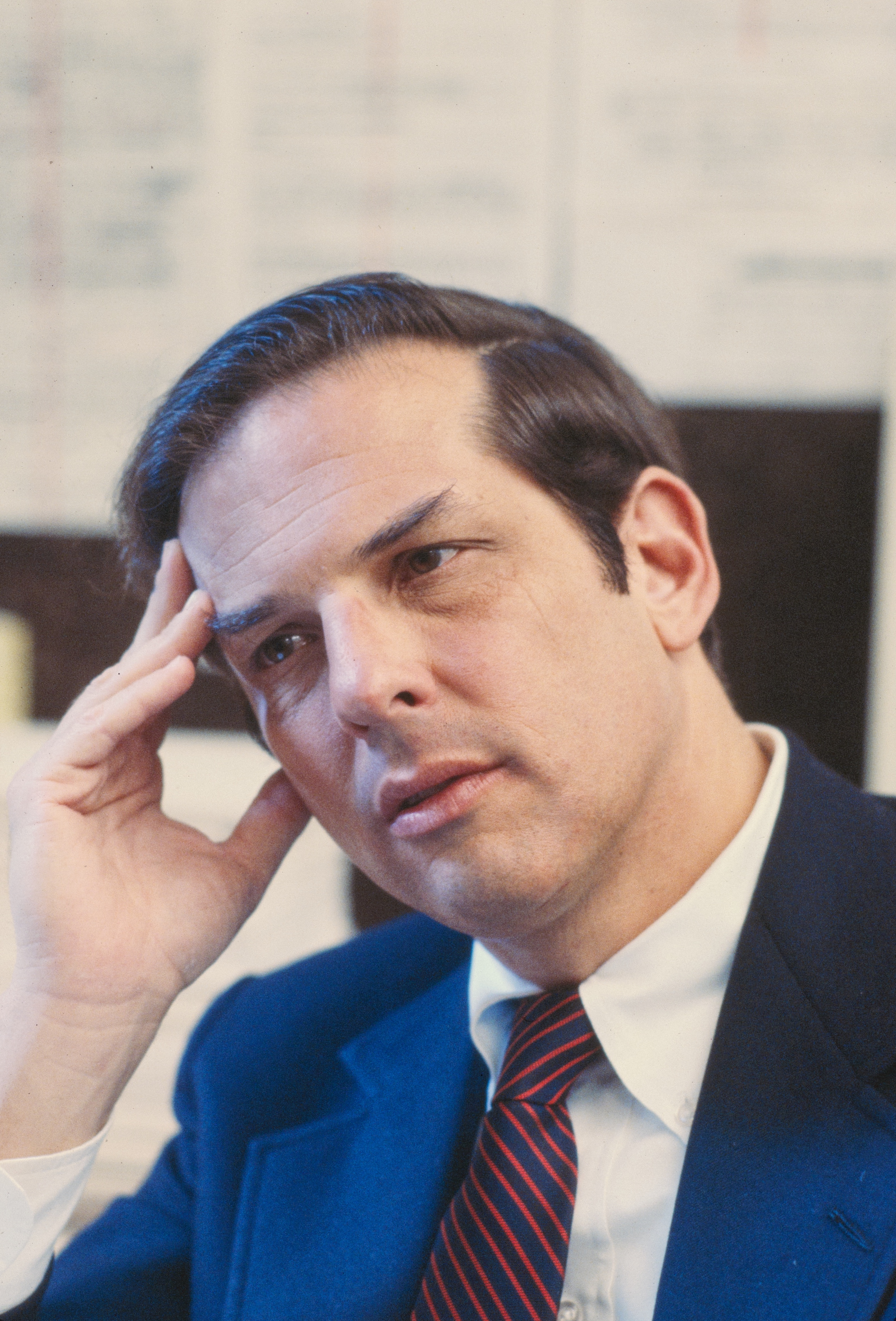
Caro in 1982

Caro gave a speech to introduce Senator Ted Kennedy on the second day of the 2004 Democratic National Convention, emphasizing the importance of courage in American leaders.

== Work ==
=== The Power Broker ===
Caro spent the academic year of 1965–1966 as a Nieman Fellow at Harvard University. During a class on urban planning and land use, the experience of watching Moses returned to him.

They were talking one day about highways and where they got built ... and here were these mathematical formulas about traffic density and population density and so on, and all of a sudden I said to myself: "This is completely wrong. This isn't why highways get built. Highways get built because Robert Moses wants them built there. If you don't find out and explain to people where Robert Moses gets his power, then everything else you do is going to be dishonest."

To do so, Caro began work on a biography of Moses, The Power Broker: Robert Moses and the Fall of New York, also a study of Caro's favorite theme: the acquisition and use of power. He expected it would take nine months to complete, but instead it took him until 1974. The work was based on extensive research and a total of 522 interviews, including several with Michael Madigan (who worked for Moses for 35 years); numerous interviews with Sidney Shapiro (Moses's general manager for forty years) and seven interviews with Moses himself. Caro also interviewed men who worked for and knew Moses's mentor, New York Governor Al Smith. During the 1967–1968 academic year, Caro worked on the book as a Carnegie Fellow at the Columbia University Graduate School of Journalism.

His wife, Ina, worked with Caro as his research assistant. Her master's thesis on the Verrazzano–Narrows Bridge stemmed from this work. At one point she sold the family home and took a teaching job so Robert would be financially able to finish the book.

The Power Broker is widely viewed as a seminal work because it combined painstaking historical research with a smoothly flowing narrative writing style. The success of this approach was evident in his chapter on the construction of the Cross Bronx Expressway, where Caro reported the controversy from all perspectives, including that of neighborhood residents. The result was a work of powerful literary as well as academic interest. Upon its publication, Moses responded to the biography in a 23-page statement repudiating the book.

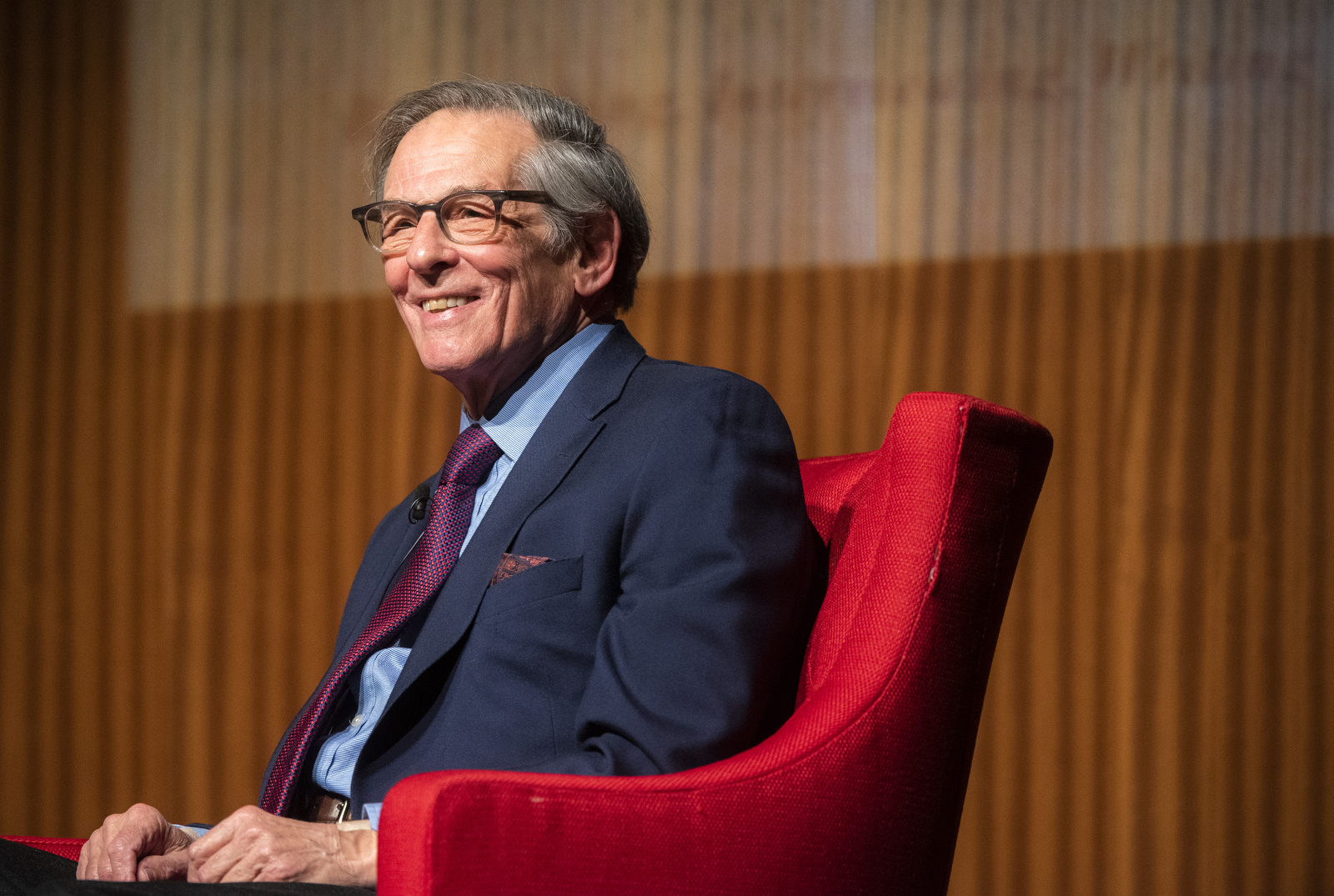
Caro at the LBJ Presidential Library, 2019

=== The Years of Lyndon Johnson ===
Following The Power Broker, Caro turned his attention to President Lyndon B. Johnson. Caro's editor Robert Gottlieb initially suggested the Johnson project to Caro in preference to the planned follow-up to the Moses volume, a biography of Fiorello La Guardia. The ex-president had recently died and Caro had already decided, before meeting with Gottlieb on the subject, to undertake his biography; he "wanted to write about power".

Caro retraced Johnson's life by temporarily moving to rural Texas and Washington, D.C., in order to better understand Johnson's upbringing and to interview anyone who had known Johnson. The work, entitled The Years of Lyndon Johnson, was originally intended as a trilogy, but is projected to encompass five volumes:

1. The Path to Power (1982) covers Johnson's life up to his failed 1941 campaign for the United States Senate.
2. Means of Ascent (1990) commences in the aftermath of that defeat and continues through his election to that office in 1948.
3. Master of the Senate (2002) chronicles Johnson's rapid ascent and rule as Senate Majority Leader.
4. The Passage of Power (2012) details the 1960 election, LBJ's life as vice president, the JFK assassination and his first days as president.
5. One as-of-yet unpublished final volume.

In November 2011, Caro announced that the full project had expanded to five volumes with the fifth requiring another two to three years to write. It will cover Johnson and Vietnam, the Great Society and civil rights era, his decision not to run in 1968, and eventual retirement.

In a 2017 interview, Caro expressed his intent to embark shortly on a research trip to Vietnam. In an interview with The New York Review of Books in January 2018, Caro indicated he did not know when the book would be finished, mentioning anywhere from two to ten years.

As of March 2025, Caro had completed 980 pages of the fifth volume. In a subsequent interview in May 2026, Caro stated he had completed 983 pages and indicated that the 24 pages of notes adorning his corkboard were "the rest of the book".

Caro's books portray Johnson as a complex and contradictory character: at the same time a scheming opportunist and visionary progressive. Caro argues, for example, that Johnson's victory in the 1948 runoff for the Democratic nomination for the U.S. Senate was only achieved through extensive fraud and ballot box stuffing, although this is set in the practices of the time and in the context of Johnson's previous defeat in his 1941 race for the Senate, the victim of exactly similar chicanery. Caro highlighted some of Johnson's campaign contributions, such as those from the Texas construction firm Brown and Root. In 1962, the company was acquired by another Texas firm, Halliburton, which became a major contractor in the Vietnam War.

Caro argued that Johnson was awarded the Silver Star in World War II for political as well as military reasons, and that he later lied to journalists and the public about the circumstances for which it was awarded. Caro's portrayal of Johnson also notes his struggles on behalf of progressive causes such as the Voting Rights Act, and his consummate skill in getting this enacted in spite of intense opposition from Southern Democrats.

Among sources close to the late president, Johnson's widow Lady Bird Johnson "spoke to [Caro] several times and then abruptly stopped without giving a reason, and Bill Moyers, Johnson's press secretary, never consented to be interviewed, but most of Johnson's closest friends, including John Connally and George Christian, Johnson's last press secretary, who spoke to Caro practically on his deathbed, have gone on the record".

While writing the books, Caro read the works of the novelist Leo Tolstoy and the historian Edward Gibbon, alternating between the two. "There's almost a view that if it's well written it can't be good history," he told Mark Rozzo of the Los Angeles Times in 2002. "In my view, it's not good history unless it is well written. History is a narrative. History is a story. If you're not telling a story, you're not being faithful to history."

=== Caro's editors and publishers ===
Caro's books have been published by Alfred A. Knopf, first under editor-in-chief Robert Gottlieb and then by Sonny Mehta after Gottlieb's temporary departure to The New Yorker in 1987. Gottlieb remained Caro's primary editor throughout. "We have these unbelievable angry exchanges, but it's always worth it to me," Caro said of his relationship with Gottlieb. "Sometimes we can spend two hours discussing whether to combine two paragraphs." Following the deaths of Mehta and Gottlieb, primary editing responsibility fell to his long-time second editor Kathy Hourigan.

A 2022 documentary, Turn Every Page: The Adventures of Robert Caro and Robert Gottlieb, examined Caro and Gottlieb's working relationship.

=== Future projects ===
Caro has expressed hope of writing a "full-scale memoir" after completing The Years of Lyndon Johnson. His 2019 book Working has been described as a "semi-memoir" focused on "Caro's selection of observations ... on the arts of researching, interviewing and writing".

When asked about other works he would have pursued, Caro replied a biography on Al Smith, commenting "the more you learn about Al Smith, the more you realize he is probably the most forgotten consequential figure in American history."

=== Writing process ===
External videos
- Q&A interview with Caro in Caro's office, December 19, 2008, C-SPAN

After conducting his years-long research, Caro attempts to "see the whole book right down to the last line," by putting up an outline on a 22-foot corkboard before writing the first manuscript, as a way to prevent writer's block. He writes several successive drafts in longhand on discontinued "legal pads, white with narrow lines," which Caro has mass-ordered and keeps in East Hampton. Subsequently, Caro types his books on Smith Corona Electra 210 typewriters, which The New Republic called "a model practically synonymous with him".

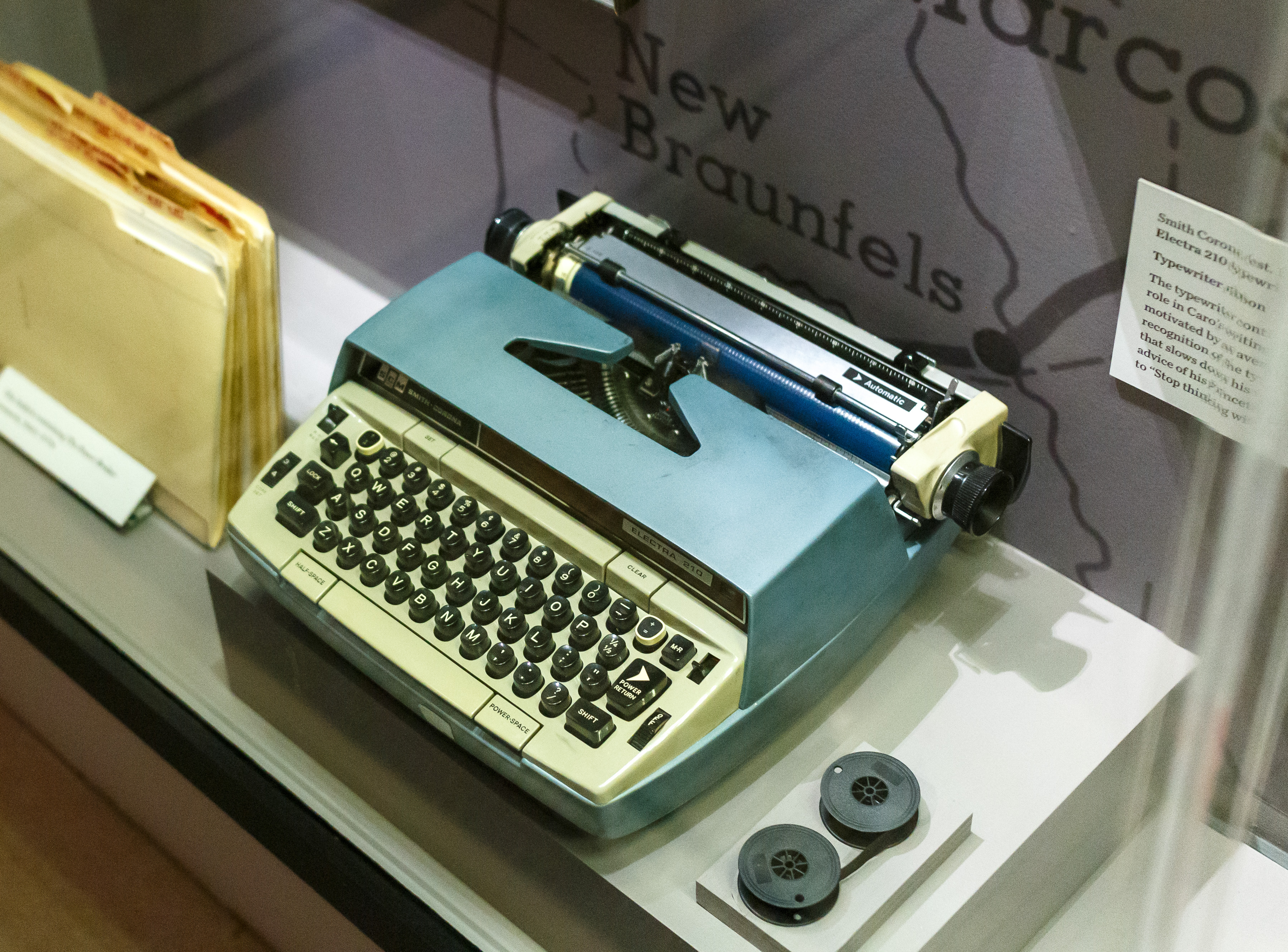
Caro's Smith Corona at the New York Historical

Upon the publication of The Passage of Power in 2012, Caro owned 14 Smith Coronas, which came down to 11 in 2019. One of these, the one used when writing The Power Broker, was placed on display at the New York Historical's "Turn Every Page": Inside the Robert A. Caro Archive exhibition. Since production of these was discontinued, Caro uses his reserve to supply parts when these become defective. The typewriters are supplied to him from individuals who, upon knowing his use of the Smith Coronas, send theirs to him. Other individuals have attempted to sell Caro theirs. However, he only answers letters offering them as gifts.

Since Caro retypes several versions of his manuscripts before submitting them for publication, he prefers a bolder text, which he achieves by using cotton ribbon, instead of the now-common nylon. As the former were discontinued, his wife Ina found a supplier that would manufacture them on the condition that Caro order a dozen gross, or 1,728 units. He edits with the use of red 314 Berol Draughting pencils and keeps "a ledger tracking how many words he has written against his stringent 1,000-word daily goal". Though he now works in an office, at one point he wrote "in the woods ... in a shack, a 12×15 ... put on cinderblocks".

=== Fiction ===
In the 1950s, Caro wrote several stories, published in Princeton Tiger, Nassau Literary, and other magazines. Among his published stories are "Thirty Second Break", "Salt Water Baptism", "The Mile", and "The Glitter and the Glare" (all published in 1954). In 1974, after The Power Broker was published, Caro had a contract with Knopf for a novel "about journalism, focusing on an investigative reporter". It was variously titled The Powers of the Press, News Man: A Novel, and The Ladies in the Lobby. Caro remembered that he sent the draft to his editor, Robert Gottlieb, who told him "Forget this." The draft is now in Caro's research archive.

== Awards and honors ==
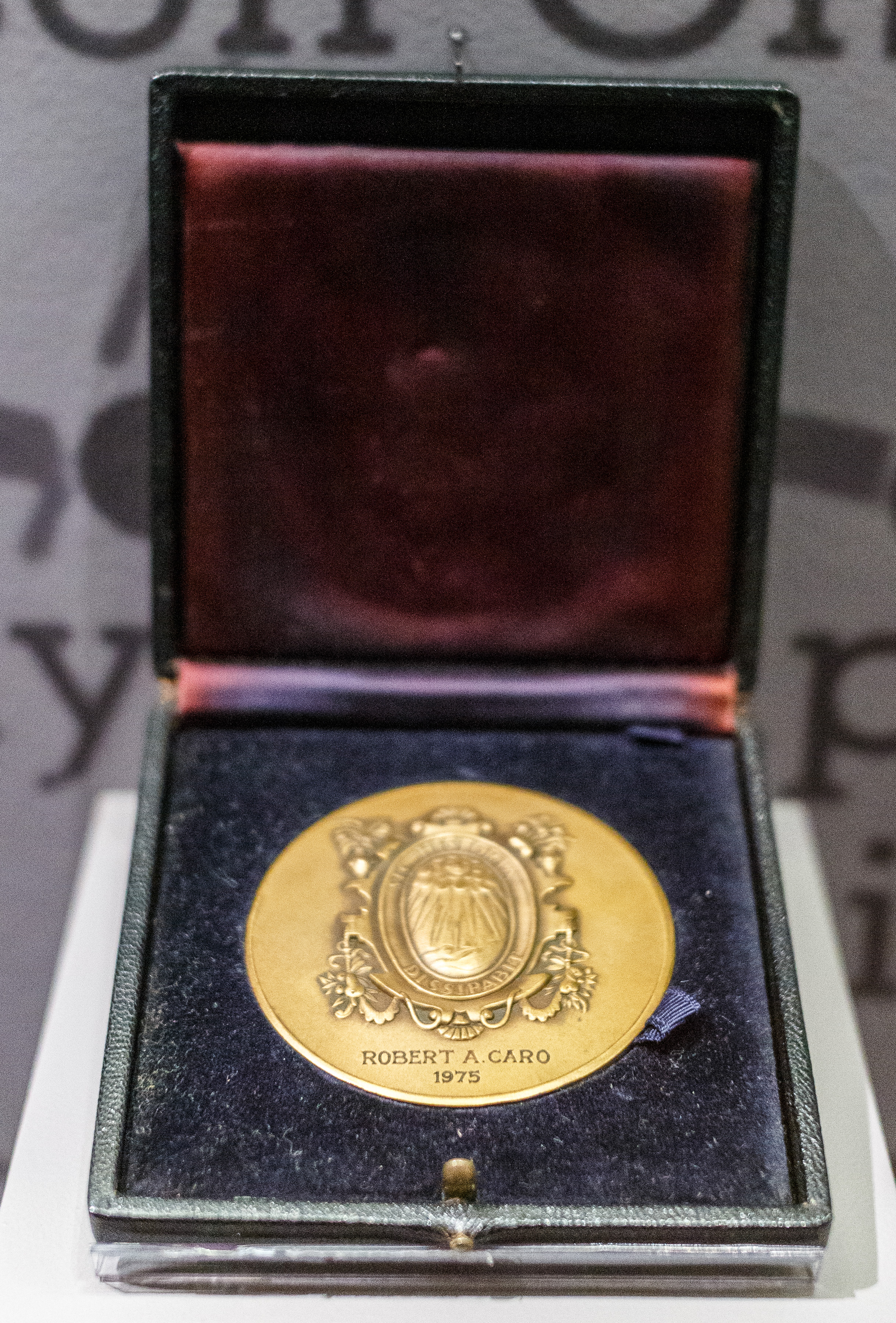
Caro's Francis Parkman Prize

For his biographies of Robert Moses and Lyndon B. Johnson, Caro has won the Pulitzer Prize for Biography twice, the National Book Critics Circle Award for the Best Nonfiction Book of the Year three times, and various other major literary honors, including two National Book Awards (one for Lifetime Achievement), the Gold Medal in Biography from the American Academy of Art and Letters, and the Francis Parkman Prize.

In October 2007, Caro was named a "Holtzbrinck Distinguished Visitor" at the American Academy in Berlin, Germany but then was unable to attend.

In 2010, he received the National Humanities Medal from President Barack Obama, the highest award in the humanities given in the United States. Delivering remarks at the end of the ceremony, the President said, "I think about Robert Caro and reading The Power Broker back when I was 22 years old and just being mesmerized, and I'm sure it helped to shape how I think about politics." In 2011, Robert Caro was the recipient of the 2011 BIO Award given each year by members of Biographers International "to a colleague who had made a major contribution in the advancement of the art and craft of real life depiction".

- 1964 – The Society of Silurians Award for outstanding achievement in the field of Public Service History for a series entitled "Misery Acres," exposing fraudulent real estate sales by mail
- 1964 – The Deadline Club for outstanding newspaper reporting
- 1965 – The Deadline Club for outstanding newspaper reporting
- 1965–1966 – Nieman Fellowship from Harvard University Nieman Foundation
- 1975 – Washington Monthly American Political Book Award (The Power Broker)
- 1975 – The Francis Parkman Prize awarded by the Society of American Historians to the book that best "exemplifies the union of the historian and the artist" (The Power Broker)
- 1975 – The Pulitzer Prize for Biography (The Power Broker)
- 1975 – American Institute of Architects (AIA) Special Citation
- 1982 – The National Book Critics Circle Award for Best Nonfiction Book of the Year (The Path to Power)
- 1983 – The Blue Pencil Award from the Columbia Daily Spectator
- 1983 – American Academy of Arts and Letters Award
- 1983 – The Carr P. Collins Award from the Texas Institute of Letters (The Path to Power)
- 1983 – The Mencken Award for the best book of 1982 (The Path to Power)
- 1986 – The Gold Medal in Biography from the American Academy of Art and Letters
- 1990 – The National Book Critics Circle Award for Best Nonfiction Book of the Year (Means of Ascent)
- 1991 – Washington Monthly American Political Book Award (Means of Ascent)
- 2002 – The Power Broker chosen by the Modern Library as one of the 100 greatest non-fiction books of the twentieth century
- 2002 – The National Book Award (Master of the Senate)
- 2003 – The Los Angeles Times Book Award in Non-Fiction (Master of the Senate)
- 2003 – The Carl Sandburg Award in Literature (Master of the Senate)
- 2003 – The John Steinbeck Award in literature (Master of the Senate)
- 2003 – The Pulitzer Prize for Biography (Master of the Senate)
- 2008 – Elected into the American Academy of Arts and Letters
- 2009 – Elected a member of the American Academy of Arts and Sciences
- 2010 – Inducted into the New York Writers Hall of Fame
- 2010 – The National Humanities Medal
- 2011 – The BIO Award from Biographers International Organization for advancing the art and craft of biography.
- 2012 – National Book Award (Nonfiction), finalist, The Passage of Power: The Years of Lyndon Johnson
- 2012 – National Book Critics Circle Award (Biography), finalist, The Passage of Power: The Years of Lyndon Johnson
- 2012 – The Los Angeles Times Book Award in Non-Fiction (The Passage of Power)
- 2012 – The New York Historical Society American History Book Prize (The Passage of Power)
- 2012 – The Mark Lynton History Prize (The Passage of Power)
- 2012 – Norman Mailer Prize, Biography.
- 2016 – The National Book Award (Lifetime Achievement)
- 2025 – The Authors Guild Foundation's Preston Award for Distinguished Service to the Literary Community

== Family ==
After graduation from Princeton, Caro married Ina Joan Sloshberg, who was then still a student at Connecticut College. The Caros have a son, Chase Arthur, and three grandchildren, who live in White Plains.

Caro has described his wife as "the whole team" on all five of his books. She sold their house and took a job teaching school to fund work on The Power Broker and is the only other person who conducted research for his books.

Ina is the author of The Road from the Past: Traveling Through History in France (1996), a book which Arthur Schlesinger, Jr. called, at the presentation of her honorary Doctor of Humane Letters from The City University of New York in 2011, "the essential traveling companion ... for all who love France and its history". Newsweek reviewer Peter Prescott commented, "I'd rather go to France with Ina Caro than with Henry Adams or Henry James. The unique premise of her intelligent and discerning book is so startling that it's a wonder no one has thought of it before." Ina frequently writes about her travels through France in her blog, Paris to the Past. In June 2011, W. W. Norton published her second book, Paris to the Past: Traveling Through French History by Train.

Robert Caro had a younger sibling, Michael, a retired real estate manager, who died in 2018.

Caro's son, Chase, pled guilty to second-degree grand larceny in 2007 for stealing over $750,000 from three former clients in the course of real estate transactions. In April 2008, he was sentenced to 2 1/2–7 1/2 years in prison after admitting to stealing $310,000 meant for his grandparents' trust fund. Chase agreed to pay restitution of $1.1 million, which includes funds from a third theft. All his sentences ran concurrently. As of 2012, Chase works in information technology.

== Legacy ==
Due to Caro's work ethic and voluminous work several authors have been compared to him and labelled as "Caro-esque", "Caro-like" or "in the Caro mold" for their own extensive research. These include Renata Adler, Wayne Barrett, Taylor Branch, David Garrow, Garrett Graff, Gerard Henderson, Jason Horowitz, Francis Jennings, Robert G. Kaiser, David Paul Kuhn, Roland Lazenby, Mark Lewisohn, David Maraniss, David McCullough, Edmund Morris, Roger Morris, David Nasaw, Les and Tamara Payne, Steven Pressfield, Michael Shnayerson, Lytton Strachey, Julia E. Sweig, William T. Vollmann, and the Democratic Congressional Campaign Committee's Research Department.

In 2011, his alma mater, Horace Mann School, began awarding the Robert Caro '53 Prize for Literary Excellence in the Writing of History, at a ceremony held annually at the head of school's home. In 2017, the school named a classroom at Tillinghast Hall, the "Robert A. Caro '53 History Classroom", to which Caro reacted by stating that it would be "hard for [him] to think of anything that would make [him] happier".

Motherless Brooklyn, the 2019 film directed by Edward Norton, loosely based on the 1999 novel of the same name by Jonathan Lethem, was inspired by Caro's biography of Robert Moses, The Power Broker. León Krauze wrote in Slate comparing Norton's character in that film to Caro himself.

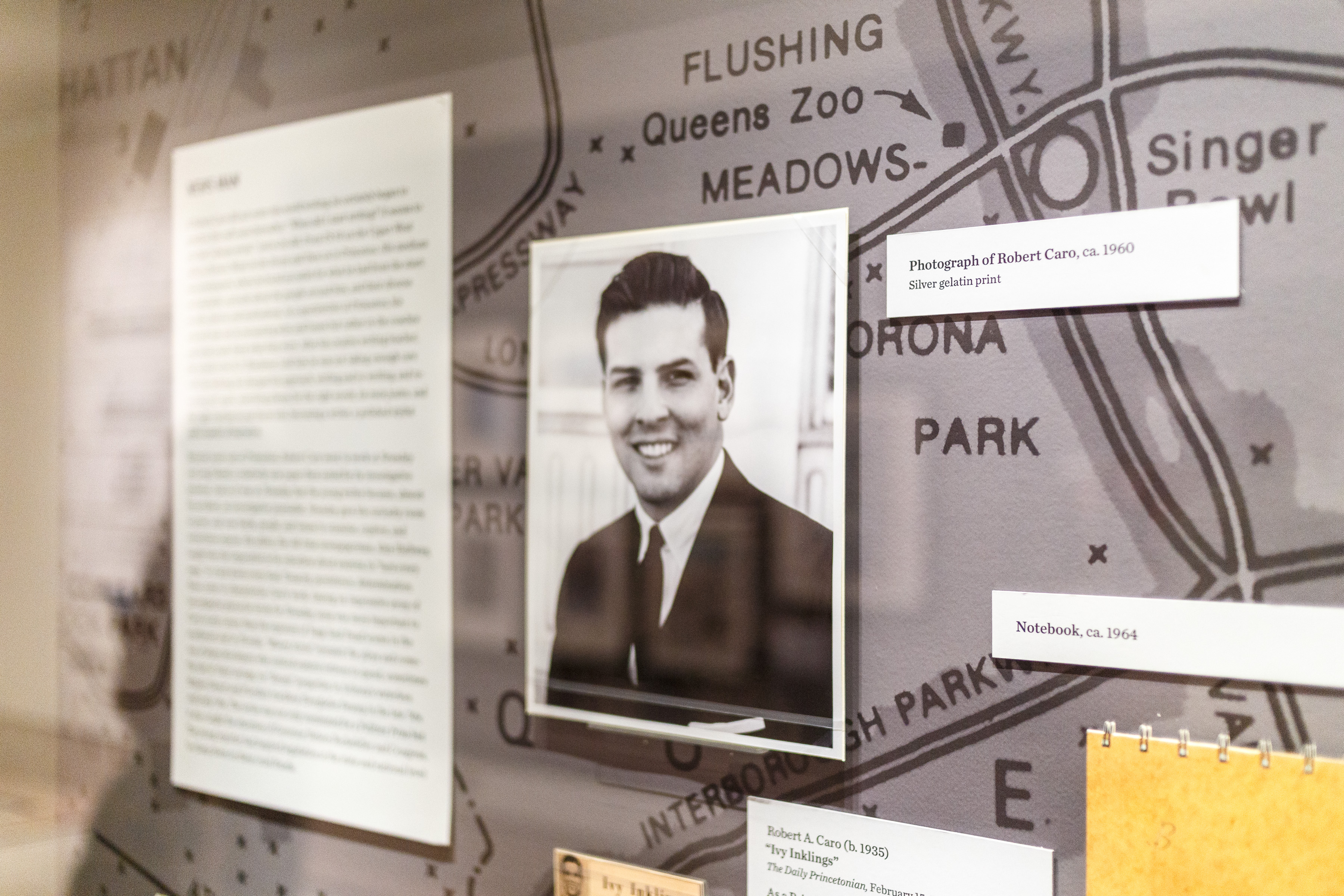
"Turn Every Page" exhibit at the New-York Historical Society

In January 2020, the New-York Historical Society acquired Caro's complete archive, consisting of "200 linear feet of material", part of which will be digitized and made wholly available to researchers in a Robert A. Caro Study Space. A permanent exhibition, named Robert Caro Working, after his 2019 book Working, will be set up at the Society's library. Caro stated that he was "just plain delighted" since his "favorite aunt often took" him there, as well as having spoken there and "been a recipient of its awards".

An exhibition called "Turn Every Page": Inside the Robert A. Caro Archive opened on October 22, 2021, becoming "the first permanent public exhibition of an archive devoted to a living author in the country". The title comes from advice that then-editor of Newsday, Alan Hathway, gave to Caro as a young reporter on Caro's first investigative assignment. According to Caro, Hathway "looked at me for what I remember as a very long time … 'Just remember,' he said. 'Turn every page. Never assume anything. Turn every goddamn page.'" The advice is the title of the 2022 documentary on Caro and editor Robert Gottlieb's collaborations, directed by the latter's daughter, Lizzie Gottlieb.

== Selected works ==
=== Books ===
- Caro, Robert (1974). The Power Broker: Robert Moses and the Fall of New York. New York: Knopf. ISBN 978-0-394-48076-3.
- Caro, Robert A., The Years of Lyndon Johnson: The Path to Power. 1982. Alfred A. Knopf Inc., New York. ISBN 0-394-49973-5. xxiii + 882 p. + 48 p. of plates: illus.
- Caro, Robert A., The Years of Lyndon Johnson: Means of Ascent. 1990. Alfred A. Knopf Inc., New York. ISBN 0-394-52835-2. xxxiv + 506 pp.
- Caro, Robert A., The Years of Lyndon Johnson: Master of the Senate. 2002. Alfred A. Knopf Inc., New York. ISBN 0-394-52836-0. xxiv + 1167 pp.
- Caro, Robert A., The Years of Lyndon Johnson: The Passage of Power. 2012. Alfred A. Knopf Inc., New York. ISBN 978-0-679-40507-8. 752 pp.
- Caro, Robert A., Working. April 2019. Knopf Doubleday Publishing Group, New York. ISBN 978-0-525-65635-7. 240 pp.

=== Books contributed to ===
- Zinsser, William Knowlton (ed.), Extraordinary Lives: The Art and Craft of American Biography. 2016. Houghton Mifflin, ISBN 0-395-48617-3

=== Audiobooks ===
External videos
- Q&A interview with Caro on On Power, June 25, 2017, C-SPAN

- Caro, Robert A., On Power, 2017, Audible. ISBN 978-1978664968. 1 hr and 42 mins.

=== Articles ===
- Caro, Robert A. (February 3, 1991). "My Search for Coke Stevenson". The New York Times. ISSN 0362-4331. Retrieved July 29, 2020.
- Caro, Robert A and Vonnegut, Kurt. "The Round Table: Fiction, Biography and the Use of Power". Hampton shorts. 4 : fiction plus poetry plus drama plus interviews from the Hamptons & the East End. 1999. Hamptons Literary Publications, Water Mill, N.Y.
- Caro, Robert A. (August 27, 2008). "Opinion | Johnson's Dream, Obama's Speech". The New York Times. ISSN 0362-4331. Retrieved July 29, 2020.
