= The Years of Lyndon Johnson =

Biography series by Robert Caro

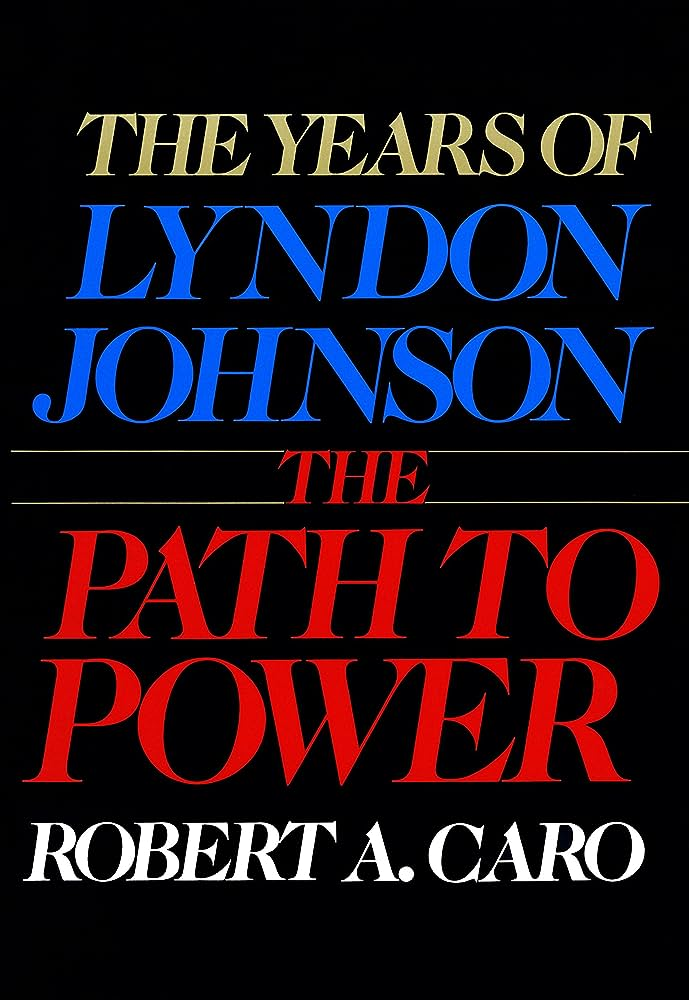
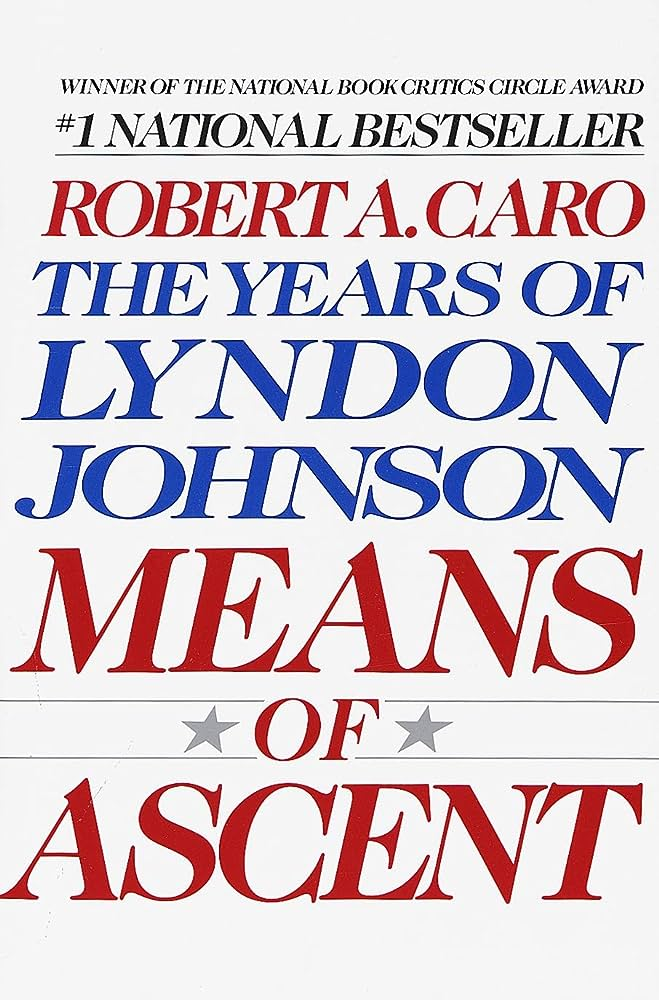
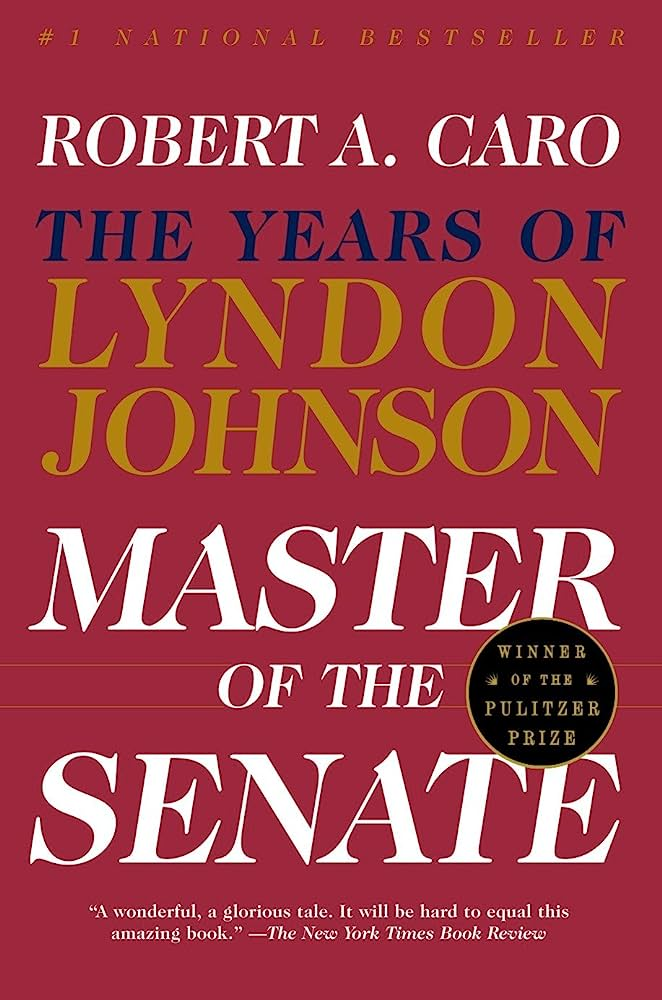
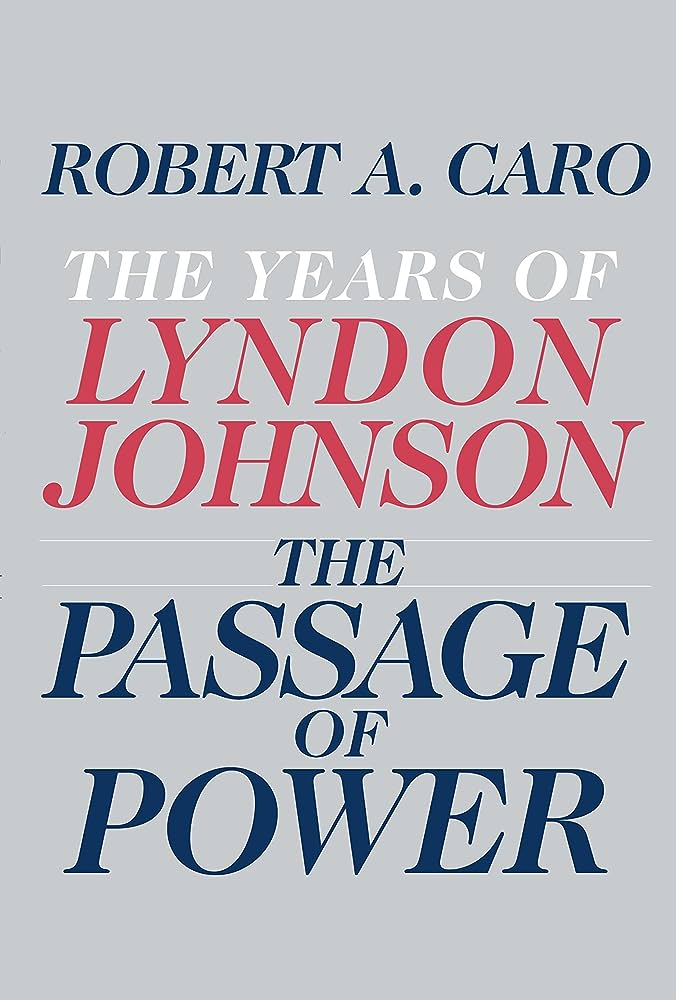
Covers of the four published books of the series

The Years of Lyndon Johnson is a multi-book biography of Lyndon B. Johnson by the American writer Robert Caro. Four volumes have been published, running to more than 3,000 pages in total, detailing Johnson's early life, education, and political career. A fifth volume, which is currently being written, is expected to deal with the bulk of Johnson's presidency and post-presidential years. The series is published by Alfred A. Knopf.

== Book One: The Path to Power (1982) ==
In the first volume, The Path to Power, Caro retraces Johnson's early life growing up in the Texas Hill Country and working in Washington, D.C. first as a congressional aide and then as a congressman. Caro's research included renting a house in the Hill Country for three years, living there much of that time, to interview numerous people who knew Johnson and his family, and to better understand the environment in which Johnson had grown up. This volume covers Johnson's life through his failed 1941 campaign for the United States Senate.

This book was released on November 12, 1982. It won the 1982 National Book Critics Circle Award. It was a finalist for the 1983 National Book Award, hardcover autobiography or biography.

== Book Two: Means of Ascent (1990) ==
In the second volume, Means of Ascent, Caro detailed Johnson's life from the aftermath of Johnson's first bid for the U.S. Senate in 1941 to his election to the Senate in 1948. Much of the book deals with Johnson's bitterly contested Democratic primary against Coke R. Stevenson in that year and the Box 13 scandal. The book was released on March 7, 1990.

== Book Three: Master of the Senate (2002) ==
In the third volume, Master of the Senate, Caro chronicles Johnson's rapid ascent in the United States Congress from 1948 to 1958, including his tenure as Senate majority leader. This 1,167-page work examines in particular Johnson's battle to pass a landmark civil rights bill through Congress without it tearing apart his party, whose southern bloc was anti-civil rights while the northern faction was more supportive of civil rights. Although its scope was limited, the ensuing Civil Rights Act of 1957 was the first such legislation since the Reconstruction era.

The book was released on April 23, 2002. It won the 2003 Pulitzer Prize for Biography or Autobiography, the 2002 National Book Award for Nonfiction, the 2002 Los Angeles Times Book Prize for Biography, and the 2002 D.B. Hardeman Prize.

== Book Four: The Passage of Power (2012) ==
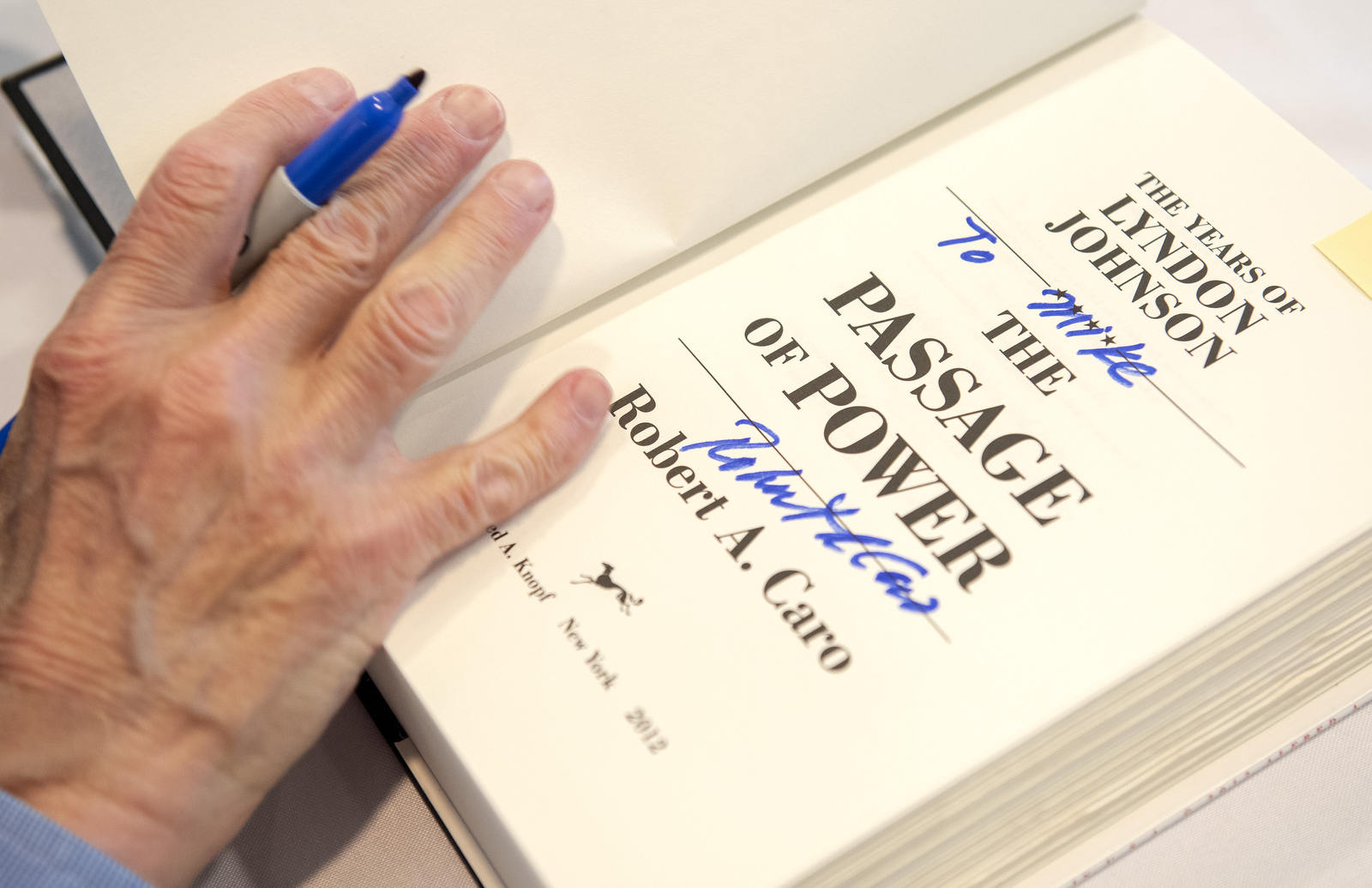
The Passage of Power with Caro's autograph

In the fourth volume, The Passage of Power, Caro covers Johnson's life from 1958 to 1964, including the presidential primary against Kennedy, the challenges Johnson faced upon his assumption of the presidency, and the significant accomplishments in the months after Kennedy's assassination.

The 736-page book was released on May 1, 2012.

It won the National Book Critics Circle Award (2012; Biography), the Los Angeles Times Book Prize (2012; Biography), the Mark Lynton History Prize (2013), the American History Book Prize (2013) and the Biographers International Organization's Plutarch Award (2013). It was a finalist for the National Book Award for Nonfiction (2012). It was selected as one of Time magazine's Best Books of the Year (non-fiction #2). It was ranked by the New York Times as #73 in its list of the 100 best books of the 21st century in 2024.

== Book Five ==
In November 2011, Caro estimated that the fifth and final volume—expected to treat the remainder of Johnson's presidency and his life thereafter—would require another two to three years to write. In March 2013, he affirmed a commitment to completing the series with a fifth volume. As of April 2014, he was continuing to research the book. In a televised interview with C-SPAN in May 2017, Caro confirmed over 400 typed pages as being complete, covering the period 1964–65; and that once he completes the section on Johnson's 1965 and 1966 legislative achievements, he intends to move to Vietnam to continue the writing process.

In an interview with the New York Review of Books in January 2018, Caro said that he was writing about 1965 and 1966 and a non-chronological section about the relationship between Johnson and Bobby Kennedy. Asked if he still planned to visit Vietnam soon, Caro replied: "Not yet, no. This is a very long book. And there's a lot to do before that's necessary. I'm getting close to it now." In December 2018, it was reported that Caro is still "several years from finishing" the volume. In January 2020, Caro said he had "typed 604 manuscript pages so far" and is "currently on a section relating to the creation of Medicare in 1965". Due to the impact of the COVID-19 pandemic in 2020, Caro postponed his research trip to Vietnam and a visit to the Johnson Presidential Library, but continued work on the book from his home in Manhattan. In October 2021, Caro said that he was writing about Johnson's passing of Medicare and his escalation of the Vietnam War. In December 2022, Caro related that he still hoped to conduct research in Vietnam. Robert Gottlieb, Caro’s editor for more than fifty years, died in June 2023; a spokesperson for Caro said that he was "continuing his work on Volume 5 with limited interruption".

In a September 2024 interview for the 50th anniversary of his book The Power Broker, Caro revealed that he was steadily making progress on the fifth book, but was re-writing sections related to the Civil Rights movement and Martin Luther King Jr. and still had a substantial amount of work to finish when it came to writing about the Vietnam War. He also revealed in separate interviews that he had completed sections related to Medicare and was receiving digital versions of Vietnam-era documents from the Johnson Presidential Library.

External videos
- Q&A interview with Caro in his home office and library, May 3, 2026, C-SPAN

Caro provided a few more updates in a February 2025 interview with Smithsonian magazine, where he revealed that he had written 980 pages for his manuscript. He also revealed that he was still working on sections for the creation of Medicare and Medicaid, from its management from Senator Russell Long to its passage through the Senate, and that he planned on embarking his trip to Vietnam once he finished those sections. He also clarified that while he will not allow someone else to finish his work, he will release whatever he has completed to the public if he dies. Caro mentioned in a May 2026 interview with C-SPAN that he had finished his portions related to Medicaid, and his current manuscript was around 983 pages. He stated that the remainder of the book would be dedicated to documenting Vietnam, from the decision-making behind it, Johnson's escalation, the troubles managing the war and support for it as it went on, as well as the average experience of a soldier stationed there. Caro provided an additional update in a September 2026 Instagram post where he stated he had completed 1,100 manuscript pages, and hinted that he might be finally making his long-delayed trip to Vietnam.

== Themes ==
Throughout the biography, Caro examines the acquisition and use of political power in American democracy, from the perspective both of those who wield it and those who are at its mercy. In an interview with Kurt Vonnegut and Daniel Stern, he once said: "I was never interested in writing biography just to show the life of a great man," saying he wanted instead "to use biography as a means of illuminating the times and the great forces that shape the times—particularly political power."

== Translation ==
There are plans for a Chinese translation of the series, collectively known under the title Lindeng Yuehanxun, published by Beijing-based Xiron Books. Chengdu resident He Yujia took four months to translate the first volume. She had not learned a significant amount of information about Lyndon Johnson in her formal education, and in accordance with her usual approach to translating non-fiction, she translated material as she read it instead of reading the entire work and then translating it. In late 2018, she spent four months translating the second volume, Jinjie zhi Ti ("Means of Ascent"), but as of 2020 the publisher still has not released the translation, nor has He Yujia received financial remuneration for her work. Peter Hessler argued that this could be related to a decline in China-United States relations.

== Influence of the series ==
Politicians have responded strongly to The Years of Lyndon Johnson:

- Bill Clinton, former President of the United States, wrote of The Passage of Power: "In sparkling detail, Caro shows the new president's genius for getting to people—friends, foes and everyone in between—and how he used it to achieve his goals."
- Walter Mondale, a former US vice president, described Master of the Senate as a "superb work of history."
- Richard Nixon, Johnson's immediate successor as President of the United States, called The Path to Power a "terrible book", expressing disbelief at its popularity and saying "it makes [Johnson] feel like a goddamn animal ... of course, he was... but he was a man"
- Gordon Brown, a former British prime minister, said of the series: "It's a wonderfully written set of books. The stories are quite breathtaking. ... These books challenge the view of history that politics is just about individual maneuvering. It's about ideas and principled policy achievements. That's what makes it one of the great political biographies."
- William Hague, a former British Conservative Party leader and foreign secretary, nominated Means of Ascent as the book he would most like to have with him on a desert island, in the BBC Radio 4 program Desert Island Discs. He later wrote: "I explained that it was the best political biography of any kind, that I had ever read. I said it conveyed more brilliantly than any other publication what it really feels like to be a politician. ... When a fourth volume finally completes the set, this will be nothing short of a magnificent history of 20th century America."
- Michael Howard, another former Conservative Party leader, encountered the series after swapping houses with Caro for a holiday. He said, "For Caro, writing a biography is writing a thriller—in Johnson's case, a Western. You can't stop turning the pages. He doesn't like Johnson, but the facts are there so you can make your own judgments. I can't recommend this book highly enough."
- Beau Willimon, who created the American version of the political drama television series House of Cards, said he had drawn inspiration for the series from The Years of Lyndon Johnson. In the last episode of the first season, a copy of The Passage of Power can be seen lying on the desk of protagonist Frank Underwood.

== See also ==
- All the Way – play

== Bibliography ==
- Caro, Robert A., The Years of Lyndon Johnson: The Path to Power. 1982. Alfred A. Knopf, Inc., New York. (ISBN 0-679-72945-3). xxiii + 882 p. + 48 p. of plates: illus.
- Caro, Robert A., The Years of Lyndon Johnson: Means of Ascent. 1990. Alfred A. Knopf, Inc., New York. (ISBN 0-679-73371-X). xxxiv + 506 pp.
- Caro, Robert A., The Years of Lyndon Johnson: Master of the Senate. 2002. Alfred A. Knopf, Inc., New York. (ISBN 0-394-72095-4). xxiv + 1167 pp.
- Caro, Robert A., The Years of Lyndon Johnson: The Passage of Power. 2012. Alfred A. Knopf, Inc., New York. (ISBN 0-375-71325-5). 736 pp.
