= Working (Caro book) =

2019 book by Robert Caro

Working: Researching, Interviewing, Writing
- First edition (US)
- Author: Robert Caro
- Subject: Memoir
- Publisher: Knopf (US); Bodley Head (UK)
- Publication date: April 9, 2019
- Pages: 240
- ISBN: 9780525656340

External videos
- C-SPAN interview with the author, 2019

Working: Researching, Interviewing, Writing is a memoir by biographer Robert Caro about the craft of biographical research and writing.
