= The Power Broker =

1974 biography of Robert Moses by Robert Caro

- Cover art of The Power Broker since publication
- Author: Robert Caro
- Language: English
- Subject: Robert Moses
- Genre: Biography
- Publisher: Knopf
- Publication date: September 16, 1974
- Publication place: United States
- Media type: Hardback, Paperback, ebook
- Pages: 1,336
- ISBN: 0-394-72024-5
- OCLC: 1631862
- Dewey Decimal: 974.7/04/0924 B
- LC Class: NA9085.M68 C37 1975

The Power Broker: Robert Moses and the Fall of New York is a 1974 biography of Robert Moses by Robert Caro. The book focuses on the creation and use of power in New York local and state politics, as witnessed through Moses's use of unelected positions to design and implement dozens of highways and bridges, sometimes at great cost to the communities he nominally served. The book was critically acclaimed, has been repeatedly named one of the best biographies of the 20th century, and has been highly influential on city planners and politicians throughout the United States. The book won a Pulitzer Prize in 1975.

== Synopsis ==
The Power Broker describes Robert Moses's strong-willed grandmother and mother before detailing his childhood in Connecticut, studies at Yale and the University of Oxford, and early career promoting progressive reform of New York City's corrupt civil service system. According to Caro, Moses's failures there, and later experience working for future New York Mayor Jimmy Walker in the State Senate and Governor of New York Al Smith taught him how to acquire and wield power to achieve his goals.

By the 1930s, Moses was widely admired as a champion for public parks in the city and state. He then led long-sought projects like the Triborough Bridge (later renamed Robert F. Kennedy Bridge), but at the price of his earlier integrity. Caro suggests that Moses's younger, idealistic self would not have been pleased with the ways Moses circumvented limits on his power in his middle and late career, such as creating and expanding New York's public authorities. Moses is portrayed as a bureaucrat who gradually shifted his focus from enacting improvements to exerting control. Because of Moses's positive reputation with citizens, track record of successful projects, and shrewd distribution of contracts, he became crucial to construction and a key figure elected officials depended on. Often, Caro shows, Moses possessed more power than the Mayor, and even the Governor. He consistently favored automobile traffic over mass transit, even ensuring mass transit could not be built in certain areas. Though Moses served in many of his public jobs without compensation (except for New York City Parks Commissioner), he lived lavishly and enabled similar lifestyles for his allies.

Ultimately, Caro presents a complicated picture of Moses. In addition to demonstrating unfavorable aspects of Moses and his work, Caro pays ample tribute to Moses's intelligence, political shrewdness, eloquence, and hands-on, if somewhat aggressive, management style.

The book is 1,336 pages long (only two-thirds of the original manuscript), and provides documentation for its assertions in most instances, which Moses and his supporters attempted to refute.

== Origins ==
As a reporter for Newsday in the early 1960s, Caro wrote a long series about why a proposed bridge across Long Island Sound from Rye to Oyster Bay, championed by Moses, would have been inadvisable. It would have required piers so large as to disrupt tidal flows in the sound, among other problems. Caro believed that his work had influenced even the state's powerful governor Nelson Rockefeller to reconsider the idea, until he saw the state's Assembly vote overwhelmingly to pass a preliminary measure for the bridge.

"That was one of the transformational moments of my life," Caro said years later. It led him to think about Moses for the first time. "I got in the car and drove home to Long Island, and I kept thinking to myself: 'Everything you've been doing is baloney. You've been writing under the belief that power in a democracy comes from the ballot box. But here's a guy who has never been elected to anything, who has enough power to turn the entire state around, and you don't have the slightest idea how he got it.'"

In 1966, Caro's wife Ina changed the topic of her graduate thesis to write about the Verrazzano–Narrows Bridge, while Caro was a Nieman Fellow at Harvard University taking courses in urban planning and land use. He found that academics' notions of highway planning contrasted with what he had seen as a reporter. "Here were these mathematical formulas about traffic density and population density and so on," he recalled, "and all of a sudden I said to myself: 'This is completely wrong. This isn't why highways get built. Highways get built because Robert Moses wants them built there. If you don't find out and explain to people where Robert Moses gets his power, then everything else you do is going to be dishonest.'"

He found that despite Moses's illustrious career, no biography had been written, save the highly flattering and propagandistic Builder for Democracy in 1952. So he decided to undertake the task himself, beginning the seven-year process of hundreds of interviews meticulously documented as well as extensive original archival research, listed in the notes on sources in an appendix.

Originally, Caro believed it would take nine months to research and write the book. He received a yearlong Carnegie fellowship to work on a biography of Moses, and quickly ran out of money. As that time stretched into years, he ran out of money and despaired of ever finishing it. Ina, his wife and research assistant, sold the family home on Long Island and moved the Caros to an apartment in the Bronx where she had taken a teaching job, so that her husband could continue.

Moses "did his best to try to keep this book from being written—as he had done, successfully, with so many previous, stillborn, biographies." After Caro had been working on the book for more than a year, Moses agreed to sit for a series of seven interviews, one lasting from 9:30 A.M. until evening, providing much material about his early life, but when Caro began asking questions (as he later wrote, "for having interviewed others involved in the subjects in question and having examined the records—many of them secret—dealing with them, it was necessary to reconcile the sometimes striking disparity between what he told me and what they told me") the series of interviews was abruptly terminated."

Caro's final manuscript ran to about 1,050,000 words. Editor Robert Gottlieb told him that the maximum possible length of a trade book was about 700,000 words, or 1,280 pages. When Caro asked about splitting the book into two volumes, Gottlieb replied that he "might get people interested in Robert Moses once. I could never get them interested in him twice." So Caro had to cut down his manuscript, which took him months.

== Reception ==
The Power Broker generated substantial public discussion upon publication, especially after the "One Mile" chapter ran as an excerpt in The New Yorker. The chapter highlighted the difficulties in constructing one section of the Cross-Bronx Expressway and the way Moses ran roughshod over the interests of residents and businesses of the section of East Tremont the road effectively destroyed. Before publication, Caro, largely unknown at the time, challenged the magazine's legendary editor, William Shawn, over his changes to Caro's prose. It was common for the magazine to edit excerpts to conform to its house style. This did not make allowance for many of the author's narrative flourishes, such as single-sentence paragraphs. Caro also complained that much of his work had been compressed.

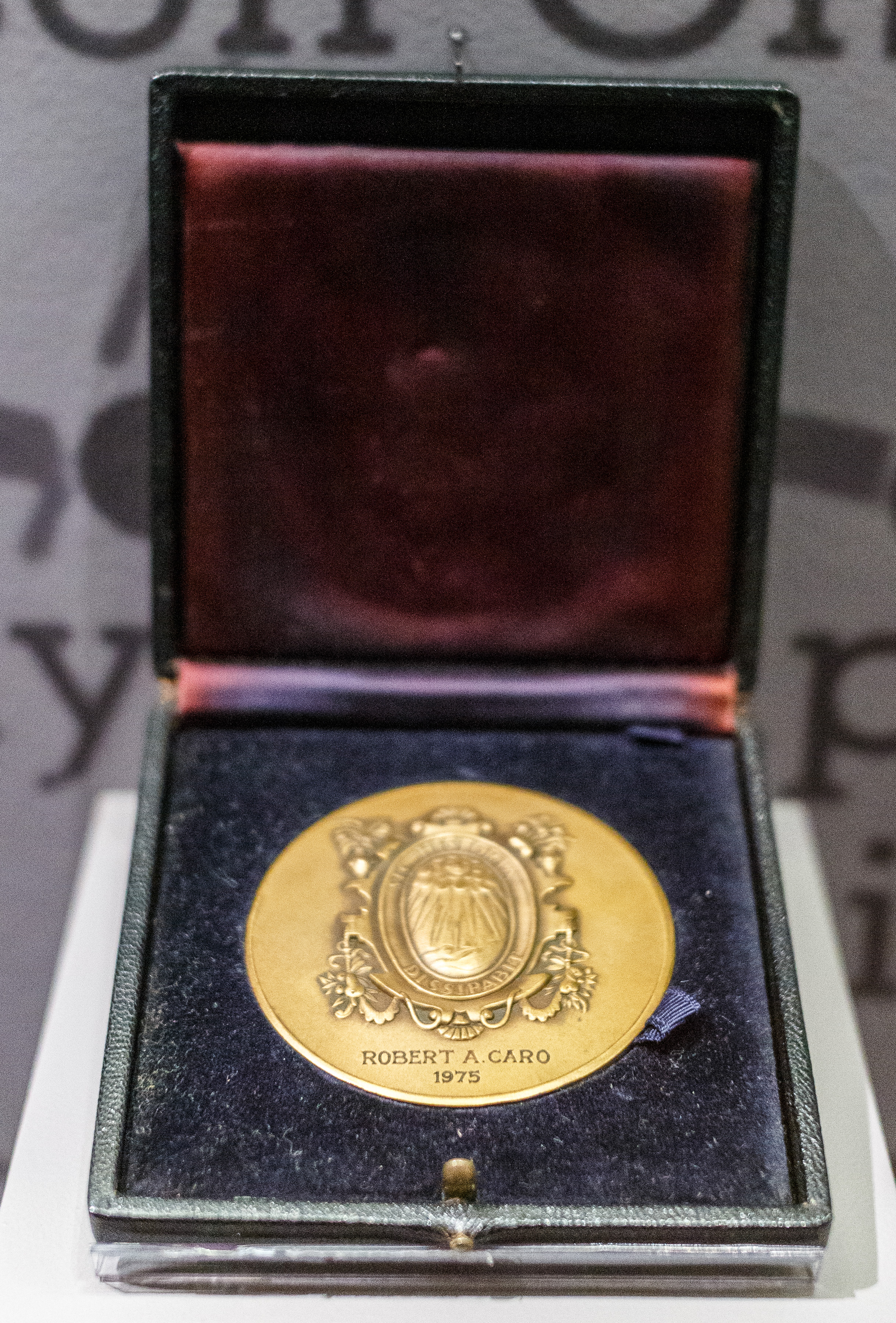
Caro's Francis Parkman Prize

The book won the Pulitzer Prize for Biography or Autobiography in 1975, as well as the Francis Parkman Prize awarded by the Society of American Historians to the book that best "exemplifies the union of the historian and the artist." On June 12, 1975, The New York Chapter of the American Institute of Architects conferred a "Special Citation upon Robert Caro ... for reminding us once again, that ends and means are inseparable." In 1986, it was recognized by the American Academy and Institute of Arts and Letters, and in 2001, the Modern Library selected it as one of the 100 most important books of the 20th century. In 2005, Caro was awarded the Gold Medal in Biography from the American Academy of Arts and Letters. In 2010, President Barack Obama, after awarding Caro a National Humanities Medal, said "I think about Robert Caro and reading The Power Broker back when I was 22 years old and just being mesmerized, and I'm sure it helped to shape how I think about politics." In 2010, Caro was inducted into the New York State Writers Hall of Fame. David Klatell, former interim dean of the Columbia University Graduate School of Journalism, recommended the book to new students to familiarize themselves with New York City and the techniques of investigative reporting.

=== Response from Moses ===
Moses and his supporters considered the book to be overwhelmingly biased against him and what his supporters considered to be a record of unprecedented accomplishment. In a 23-page typed statement which Moses put out after the publication of an excerpt of The Power Broker in the New Yorker, Moses wrote that the biography was "full of mistakes, unsupported charges, nasty, baseless personalities and random haymakers thrown at just about everybody in public life" and printed on "bumwad". Moses took particular issue with Caro's characterization of his personal life, which he labeled libelous, and Caro's description of New York city and state government. Near the end of the statement, he wrote: "It may well be that The New Yorker can sell its profiles for two bucks, but I doubt that many well-heeled readers will fork out $17.95, plus sachet, to read the unexpurgated Caro."

Caro released a brief response to the statement, which he called illustrative of Moses's character as a "smearer of reputations, purveyor of baseless innuendo and outright falsehood, [and] wholesaler of defamation".

=== 21st century re-assessment ===
Defenses of Moses's career, including museum exhibits and a 2007 book with a "revisionist theme running throughout" (Robert Moses and the Modern City) have emerged in explicit reaction to The Power Broker. A review of Robert Moses and the Modern City by Timothy Mennel remarks that "eminent scholars and critics called [The Power Broker] 'clumsy' and shallow, with many noting Caro’s Manicheanism, naïveté, weak grasp of psychology, provincialism, use of anonymous sources, and poor historiography." In 2014, Caro reminisced about his seven years' labor on the book in The New York Times Sunday Book Review.

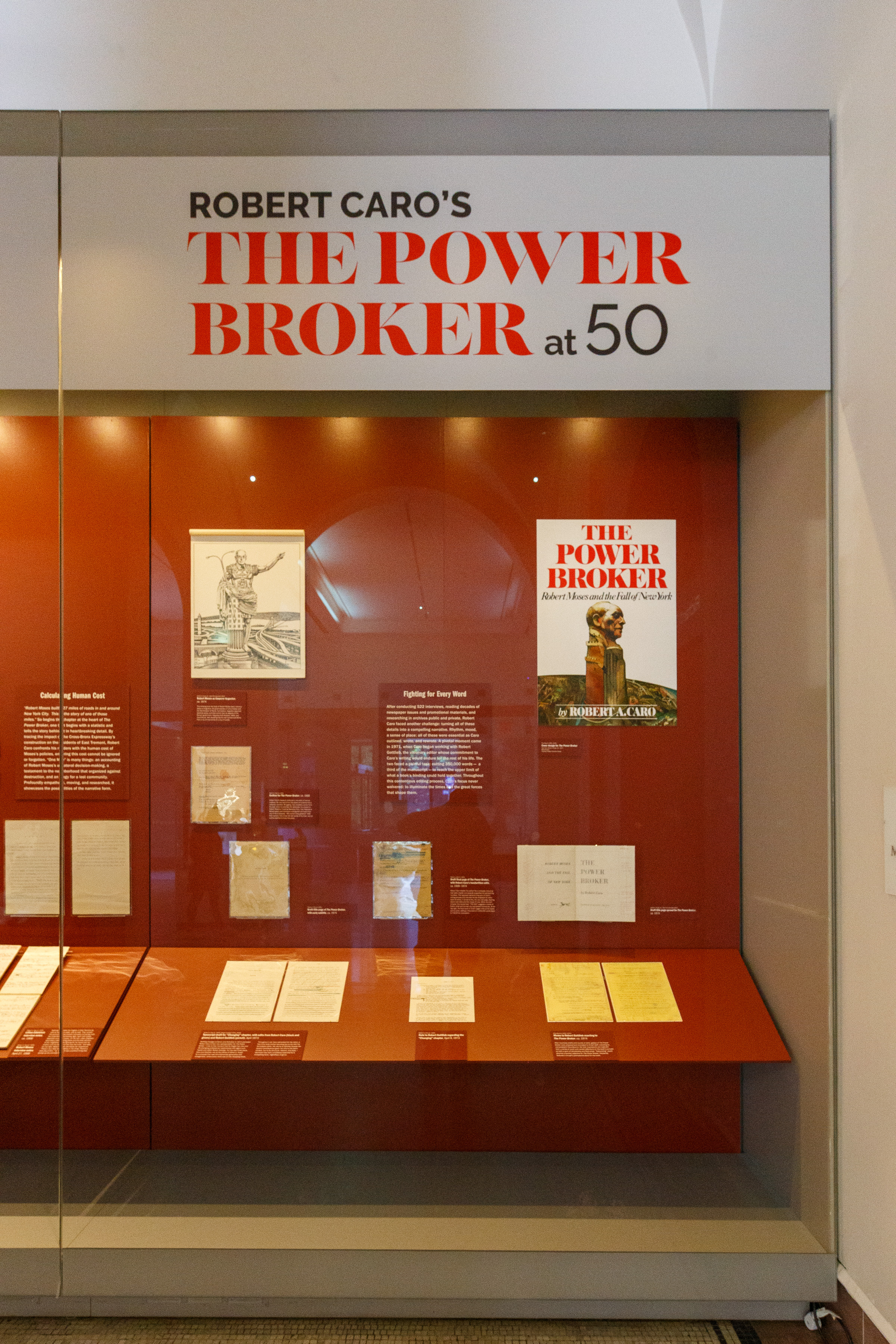
"Turn Every Page" exhibit at the New-York Historical Society

The book remains highly regarded, though not unanimously. In 2017, David W. Dunlap described The Power Broker as "the book that still must be read – 43 years after it was published – to understand how New York really works." In 2020, the book made frequent appearances as the "ultimate signifier of New York political sophistication" on the bookshelves of U.S. journalists and politicians appearing in TV interviews from their homes during the COVID-19 pandemic. Several New York politicians, including city comptroller Brad Lander, City Council member Justin Brannan, state senators Zellnor Myrie and Jessica Ramos, and former Manhattan borough president Scott Stringer, have claimed to have read the book. For the 50th anniversary of the book's publication, the New-York Historical Society hosted an exhibit about The Power Broker in late 2024. In his announcement of renovations to the Brooklyn–Queens Expressway, New York Mayor Zohran Mamdani invoked the book, which he had earlier been seen reading.

In the book Caro claims Moses built overpasses crossing his Long Island Parkways low in height to keep buses from transporting those without private automobiles (i.e. lower class, disproportionately non-white citizens) to the beaches and parks he developed as president of the Long Island State Park Commission. German professor of sociology Bernward Joerges pointed out in 1999 that "Moses did nothing different on Long Island from any parks commissioner in the country" in designing bridges too low for buses to pass under. Cornell city planning professor Thomas Campanella, in turn, measured the overpasses and found that they were "substantially lower on the Moses parkway" than elsewhere.

Historian Kenneth Jackson, a longtime Columbia University professor and editor of Robert Moses and the Modern City, is "one of the foremost and persistent critics of Caro’s work". In a 2022 interview, he called the book "an incredible achievement" which nonetheless "contains a thousand errors" below its grand narrative. He specifically labels the Long Island Parkway overpass-lowering claim, along with an episode wherein Moses allegedly intentionally cooled municipal pools to keep black swimmers out, as fabrications.

Economist Jason Barr is another prominent critic of The Power Broker, starting with its subtitle "Robert Moses and the Fall of New York". Barr writes that New York, far from having fallen in the post-industrial era, fared far better than its peers and rebounded from late-century decline far quicker than its peers, in part due to Moses's foresight. Barr partially attributes nimbyism in New York to the legacy of Caro's "simplistic" portrayal of Moses.

=== E-book edition ===
Fifty years following the first publication, an e-book edition was finally released. Caro had resisted offering a digital edition, but was finally convinced to agree to the release of an e-book because of the potential to appeal to new readers who would prefer the convenience of a digital edition, something that was particularly attractive for the 1,286-page four-pound-plus (1.8 kg) volume.

== See also ==
- History of New York City
- Motherless Brooklyn, a 2019 film partly inspired by The Power Broker
