= Ina Caro =

American travel writer

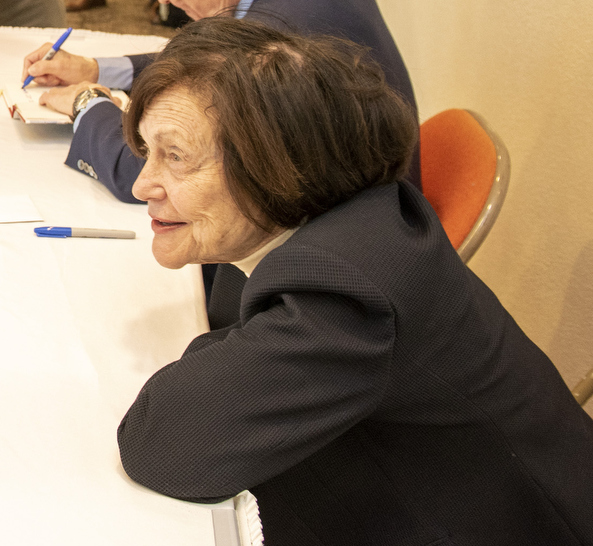
- Caro in 2019
- Born: Ina Joan Sloshberg
- Education: Connecticut College; Columbia University (BA)
- Occupations: Writer, historian
- Spouse: Robert Caro (m. 1957)
- Children: 1

Ina Caro is an American author, medieval historian and travel writer. She is the author of The Road from the Past: Traveling Through History in France and Paris to the Past: Traveling through French History by Train. She is married to Robert Caro, and has been his sole research assistant for his books.

== Biography ==
Caro was born Ina Joan Sloshberg. She married Robert Caro in 1957, while she was a student at Connecticut College. She graduated from the Columbia University School of General Studies in 1962.

While she and her husband worked on The Power Broker (1974), she worked as a substitute teacher and she sold their house so there would be enough money to support them while the book was being completed. They moved to the Bronx and she continued to support his research for his books, serving as his sole research assistant. In the late 1970s, they moved to Texas for three years to research President Johnson for The Years of Lyndon Johnson.

She is the author of The Road from the Past: Traveling Through History in France, a personal driving-tour history of France first published in 1994. In 2011, she released the sequel Paris to the Past: Traveling through French History by Train, which also combines history and travel writing, covering 700 years of French history charted through the author's train journeys.

== Critical reception ==
=== The Road From the Past ===
Katherine Knorr of the International Herald Tribune describes The Road From the Past as a "charming book" that "takes the reader time-traveling," and writes, "She begins in the ruins at Orange and Nîmes, and then ushers us through blood and fire, religious wars, feudal rivalries and monarchical madness, into the light of the Renaissance, up to Louis XIV's punishment of his superintendent of finance, Nicolas Fouquet, for the in-the- king's-face magnificence of Vaux-le-Vicomte. And thus we visit Provence, the Languedoc, the Dordogne, the Loire Valley and the Ile-de-France." Publishers Weekly writes, "Her delightful blend of travel, history and pithy observations on French culture unfolds chronologically with historic tales of love, murder, political intrigue, treachery and selflessness." Kirkus Reviews writes, "While researched satisfactorily, her approach to site-specific history tends to the parochial, and without an authority's ability to synthesize place and past, even the most notable locales cannot convey the complexities of the Wars of Religion or the Albigensian Crusade."

=== Paris to the Past ===
In 2011, Kirkus Reviews describes Paris to the Past: Traveling through French History by Train as "a lovely, fresh take on why we keep going back to France’s gorgeous, well-preserved treasures," and "A nicely organized, reliable companion for touring by train from Paris." Charles Solomon of the Los Angeles Times describes Caro as "an unabashedly enthusiastic guide," but "Caro’s accounts of French history sometimes feel spotty," and "Caro tends to repeat points, sometimes nearly verbatim," which "make the book read like a series of collected magazine articles, rather than a unified narrative." Publishers Weekly writes, "Almost despite itself, the book is a seductive evocation of the ancien régime: aristocrats were rapacious brutes, Caro allows, but she can’t resist their castles, tastes, and sexual intrigues." Jonathan Yardley writes for The Washington Post "Yes, the author’s presence is inevitable in travel writing and in the right author’s hand can be invaluable. That is not the case in "Paris to the Past," which not merely natters and babbles but also sees the French past—all too much of which is violent, bloody and autocratic—through rose-tinted glasses."

== Personal life ==
Ina Caro lives with her husband in New York. They have one son and three grandchildren.

== Books ==
- The Road from the Past: Traveling Through History in France (Doubleday, 1994)
- The Road from the Past: Traveling Through History in France (Mariner Books, 1996)
- Paris to the Past: Traveling Through French History by Train (W.W. Norton, 2011)
