= James McGrath Morris =

American biographer (born 1954)

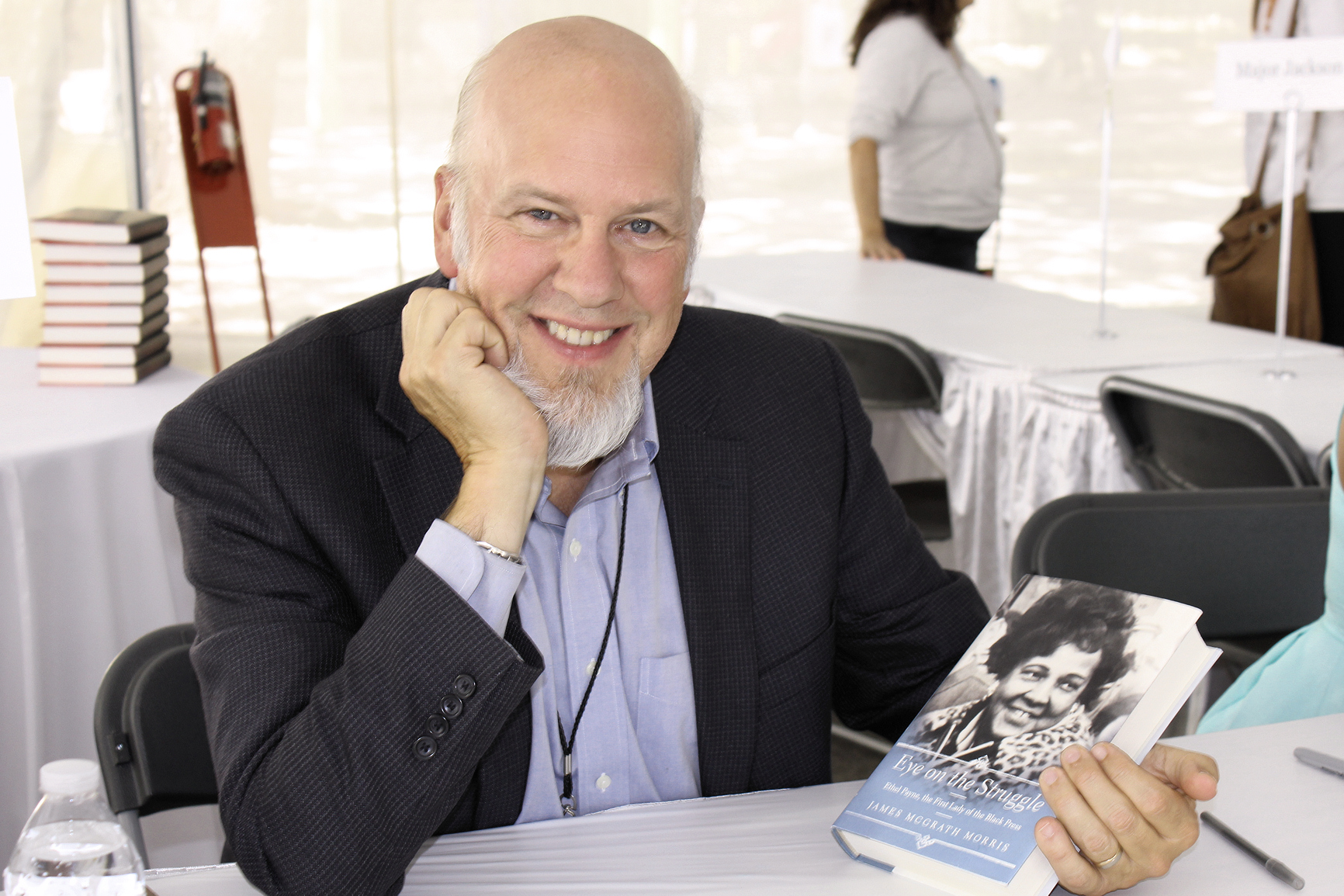
- Morris at the 2015 Texas Book Festival
- Born: 1954 (age 71–72)
- Occupation: Biographer
- Website: jamesmcgrathmorris.com

James McGrath Morris (born 1954) is an American biographer.

== Biography ==
Morris was raised in Paris, France; Brussels, Belgium; and Washington, DC. He went on to earn a bachelor's degree at American University and a master's degree at George Washington University. He is married, with three children, and makes his home with his wife, Patty Morris, in Santa Fe, New Mexico.

== Career ==
Morris has worked as a journalist, book publisher, high school teacher, and independent writer. He began his professional career as a radio news broadcaster in New Mexico in 1978. He then spent a decade working for radio networks, newspapers, and magazines in Jefferson City, Missouri; Washington, DC; and Ithaca, New York.

In 1987, Morris began a nine-year stint working in publishing, running Seven Locks Press, a publisher of public affairs books in Washington, DC, and Public Interest Publications, a distributor of books and publications produced by Washington think-tanks and interest groups.

In 1996, Morris became a high school teacher and spent nine years working for Fairfax County Schools. During this time he wrote and published Jailhouse Journalism: The Fourth Estate Behind Bars and The Rose Man of Sing Sing: A True Tale of Life, Murder and Redemption in the Age of Yellow Journalism. The Rose Man of Sing Sing was selected as one of the best non-fiction books of 2004 by the Washington Post, optioned as a movie, and released as an audio book by Random House. Its critical and commercial success prompted Morris to leave teaching and work full-time as an independent writer.

In 2010, Morris published Pulitzer: A Life in Politics, Print, and Power. The Wall Street Journal deemed was one of the five best books on American moguls and one of the five best books on American newspaper publishers while Booklist placed on its 2010 list of the ten best biographies of the year.

In 2009, with fellow biographers, Morris co-founded Biographers International Organization (BIO), a non-profit organization founded to promote the art and craft of biography, and to further the professional interests of its practitioners. In 2012, he was elected as its president.

In 2014 he published Revolution by Murder: Emma Goldman, Alexander Berkman, and the Plot to Kill Henry Clay Frick, a Kindle Single.

Morris's following book, Eye on the Struggle: Ethel Payne, The First Lady of the Black Press, was published in 2015 and widely reviewed and became a New York Times Bestseller

The Ambulance Drivers: Hemingway, Dos Passos, and a Friendship Made and Lost in War was published in 2017 by Da Capo Press. He is currently writing a biography of Tony Hillerman.

== Bibliography ==
- Jailhouse Journalism: The Fourth Estate Behind Bars, (Transaction, 2001)
- The Rose Man of Sing Sing: A True Tale of Life, Murder, and Redemption in the Age of Yellow Journalism, (Fordham University Press, 2004)
- Pulitzer: A Life in Politics, Print, and Power, (HarperCollins, 2010)
- Revolution by Murder: Emma Goldman, Alexander Berkman, and the Plot to Kill Henry Clay Frick, (Amazon Kindle Single, 2014)
- Eye on the Struggle: Ethel Payne, The First Lady of the Black Press, (Amistad/HarperCollins), 2015)
- The Ambulance Drivers: Hemingway, Dos Passos, and a Friendship Made and Lost in War, (Da Capo/Hachette, 2017)
