= Langdon Winner =

American academic (born 1944)

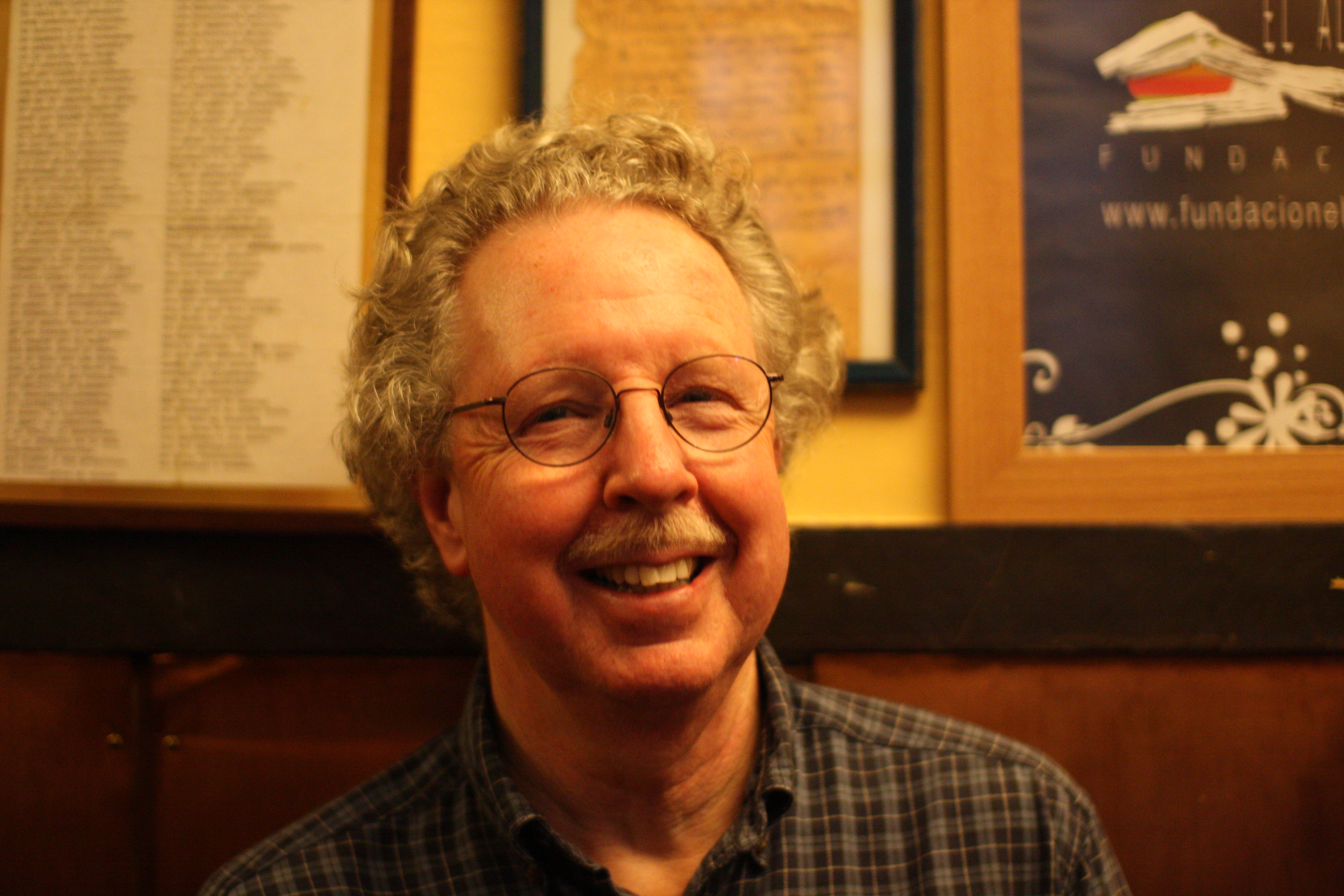
- Langdon Winner in 2010
- Born: August 7, 1944 (age 81); San Luis Obispo, California, U.S.
- Spouse: Gail P. Stuart
- Children: 3

Langdon Winner (born August 7, 1944) is an American academic who is the Thomas Phelan Chair of Humanities and Social Sciences in the Department of Science and Technology Studies at Rensselaer Polytechnic Institute, Troy, New York. His academic interests include science, technology, American popular culture, and theories of sustainability and he is known for his articles and books on science, technology, and society. He also spent several years as a reporter, rock music critic, and contributing editor for Rolling Stone magazine.

== Career ==
Langdon Winner was born in San Luis Obispo, California. He received his B.A. in 1966, M.A. in 1967 and Ph.D. in 1973, all in political science, at the University of California, Berkeley. His primary focus was political theory.

He has served as professor at the University of Leiden, MIT, University of California, Los Angeles and at the University of California, Santa Cruz. Since 1985 he has been at the Rensselaer Polytechnic Institute; he was a visiting professor at Harvey Mudd College (2000) and Colgate University (2001). In 2010 he was a Fulbright Fellow visiting the Universidad Complutense in Madrid.

His interests include science, technology, American popular culture, and theories of sustainability.

=== Technology and politics ===
In 1980 Winner proposed that technologies embody social relations, i.e. power. To the question he poses, "Do Artifacts Have Politics?" In that paper, Winner identifies two ways in which artifacts can have politics. The first, involving technical arrangements and social order, concerns how the invention, design, or arrangement of artifacts or the larger system becomes a mechanism for settling the affairs of a community. This way "transcends the simple categories of 'intended' and 'unintended' altogether", representing "instances in which the very process of technical development is so thoroughly biased in a particular direction that it regularly produces results heralded as wonderful breakthroughs by some social interests and crushing setbacks by others" (Winner, p. 25-6, 1999). It implies that the process of technological development is critical in determining the politics of an artifact; hence the importance of incorporating all stakeholders in it. (Determining who the stakeholders are and how to incorporate them are other questions entirely.)

The second way in which artifacts can have politics refers to artifacts that correlate with particular kinds of political relationships, which Winner refers to as inherently political artifacts (Winner, p. 22, 1999). He distinguishes between two types of inherently political artifacts: those that require a particular sociological system and those that are strongly compatible with a particular sociological system (Winner, p. 29, 1999). A further distinction is made between conditions internal to the workings of a given technical system and those that are external to it (Winner, p. 33, 1999). This second way in which artifacts can have politics can be further articulated as consisting of four 'types' of artifacts: those requiring a particular internal sociological system, those compatible with a particular internal sociological system, those requiring a particular external sociological system, and those compatible with a particular external sociological system.

Certain features of Winner's thesis have been criticized by other scholars, including Bernward Joerges.

=== Critique of educational technologies ===
Over the years one focus of Winner's criticism has been the excessive use of technologies in the classroom, both in K-12 schools and higher education. Winner's critique is well explained in his article "Information Technology and Educational Amnesia", and expressed in his satirical lecture, "The Automatic Professor Machine".

== Personal life and interests ==
Winner lives in southern Maine. He is married to Gail P. Stuart and has three children. In music, Winner contributed piano and backing vocals to the hoax album The Masked Marauders created by Rolling Stone. He also played piano on "Church Key" by The Revels. Winner is also notable for having written a negative review of one of the most critically acclaimed albums of the 1970s, Neil Young's After the Gold Rush.

== Publications ==
=== Selected articles ===
- "Do Artifacts Have Politics?" in Daedalus, Vol. 109, No. 1, Winter 1980. Reprinted in The Social Shaping of Technology, edited by Donald A. MacKenzie and Judy Wajcman (London: Open University Press, 1985; second edition 1999). Also adapted in Winner's book The Whale and the Reactor: A Search for Limits in an Age of High Technology, University of Chicago Press, 1986.
- "Engineering Ethics and Political Imagination," in Broad and Narrow Interpretations of Philosophy of Technology, edited by Paul T. Durbin (Dordrecht: Springer Netherlands, 1990), pp. 53–64.
- "Social Constructivism: Opening the Black Box and Finding It Empty," Science as Culture, Vol. 3, Issue 3, 1993, pp. 427–452.
- "How Technology Reweaves the Fabric of Society" in The Chronicle of Higher Education, 39, Issue 48, August 4, 1993, pp. B1-B3.
- "Sow's Ears from Silk Purses: The Strange Alchemy of Technological Visionaries," in Technological Visions: The Hopes and Fears that Shape New Technologies, edited by Marita Sturken, Douglas Thomas and Sandra J. Ball-Rokeach (Temple University Press, Philadelphia, 2004), pp. 34–47.

=== Selected books ===
- Autonomous Technology: Technics-out-of-Control as a Theme in Political Thought, M.I.T. Press, 1977. (ISBN 978-0262730495)
- The Whale and the Reactor: A Search for Limits in an Age of High Technology, University of Chicago Press, 1986. (ISBN 978-0226902111)
- Technology and Democracy, (editor), Dordrecht and Boston: Reidel/Kluwer, 1992.
- Technology and Democracy: Technology in the Public Sphere, co-edited with Andrew Feenberg and Torben Hviid Nielsen, Oslo: Center for Technology and Culture, 1997.
