= Charles J. Shields =

American biographer

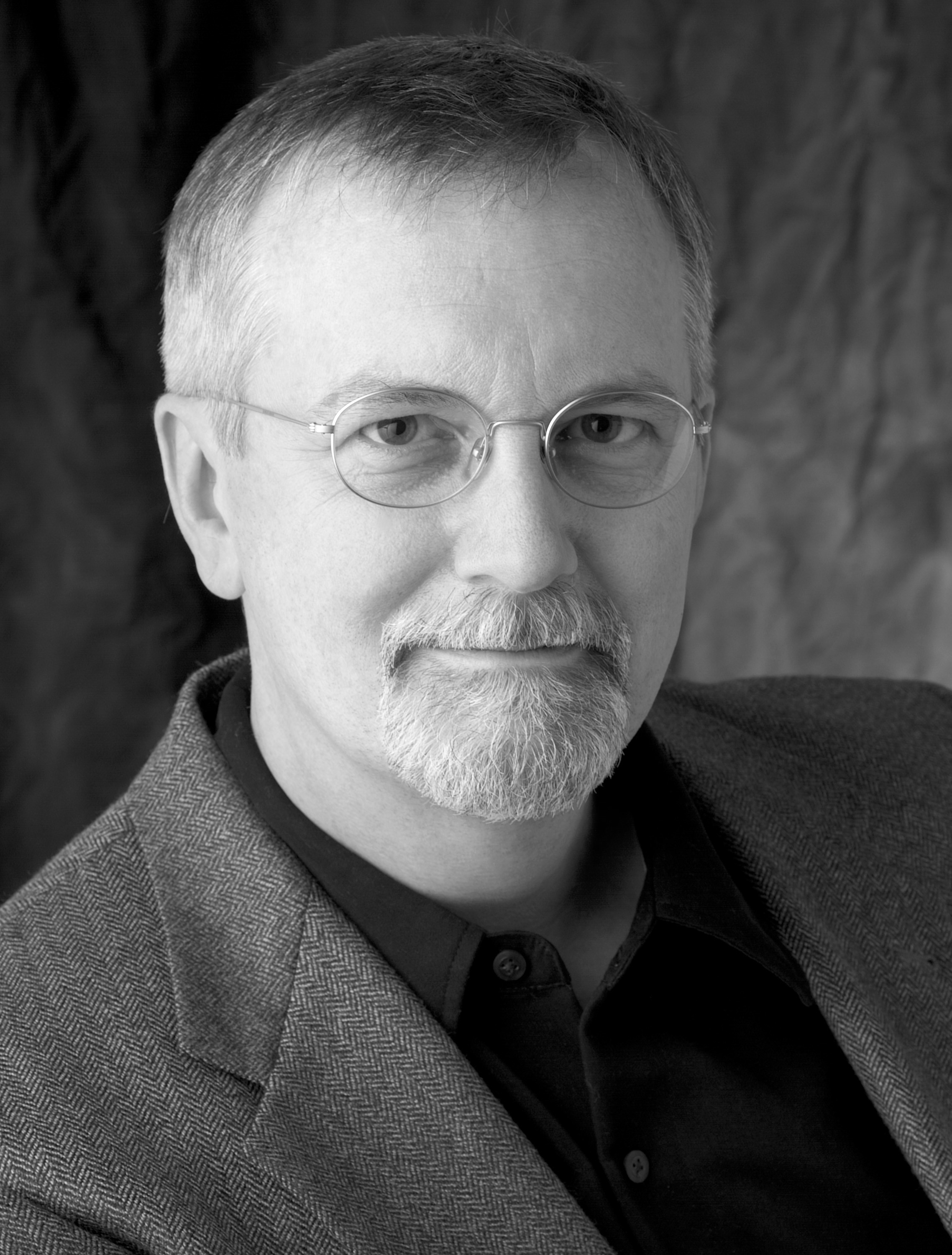
photograph by Michael Bailey

Charles J. Shields (born December 2, 1951) is an American biographer of mid-century American novelists and writers.

Raised in a Chicago suburb, Shields attended the University of Illinois Urbana-Champaign, graduating with degrees in English (1974) and American history (1979).

== Career ==
In 1997, Shields left his career in education to write independently. Over the course of the next six years, he published 20 histories and biographies for young people. In 2002, E.D. Hirsch (Cultural Literacy: What Every American Needs to Know, 1988) invited Shields to join his Core Knowledge Foundation in Charlottesville, Virginia as senior editor, contributing to a curriculum which, adapted, became the Common Core Standards Initiative that "define the knowledge and skills students should gain throughout their K-12 education in order to graduate high school prepared to succeed in entry-level careers, introductory academic college courses, and workforce training programs." Forty-one states, the District of Columbia, four territories, and the Department of Defense Education Activity have voluntarily adopted the Common Core.

Shields's first biography for adults in 2006— Mockingbird: A Portrait of Harper Lee (Holt) went on to become a New York Times bestseller and a Book-of-the-Month Club alternate. “This biography will not disappoint those who loved the novel and the feisty, independent, fiercely loyal Scout, in whom Harper Lee put so much of herself,” wrote Garrison Keillor in the New York Times Sunday Book Review. “As readable, convincing, and engrossing as Lee’s literary wonder,” said the Orlando Sentinel. The biography appeared in a revised edition in 2016 as Mockingbird: A Portrait of Harper Lee: From Scout to Go Set a Watchman (Holt).

For the National Endowment for the Arts' "Big Read" initiative, Shields spoke to hundreds of audiences about his biography of Harper Lee for community-wide reads of To Kill a Mockingbird. Several versions of his talks are archived on the Internet.

Two years later, Shields followed-up his biography of Lee with a young adult version: I Am Scout: The Biography of Harper Lee (Holt), selected by the Junior Library Guild, and recommended among the American Library Association Best Books for Young Adults and Arizona Grand Canyon Young Readers Master List.

In 2009, with fellow biographers Nigel Hamilton, James McGrath Morris, and Pulitzer-prize winner Debby Applegate, Shields co-founded Biographers International Organization (BIO), a non-profit organization founded to promote the art and craft of biography, and to further the professional interests of its practitioners.

In November 2011, Shields published the first biography of Kurt Vonnegut, And So It Goes: Kurt Vonnegut, A Life (Holt), described by Steve Almond in the Boston Globe as a “disturbing account of the late author, whose ambition and talent transformed him from an obscure science fiction writer to a countercultural icon,” and an "engrossing, definitive biography" by Publishers Weekly in a starred review. It was selected as a New York Times Notable Book, and Washington Post Notable Nonfiction Book for 2011.

In 2018, the University of Texas Press published Shields’ The Man Who Wrote the Perfect Novel: John Williams, Stoner & the Writing Life. “Shields knows how to tell a good story,” said the Los Angeles Review of Books, “one that will appeal especially to those interested in the ins and outs of the publishing industry and the ups and downs of a writer’s life (spoiler alert: there are many).”

Lorraine Hansberry: The Life Behind a Raisin in the Sun was published by Holt in January 2022.

== Personal life ==
Shields is married and lives in Charlottesville, Virginia. He is the father of Andrew (1983–2012), and Lauren Shields, author of The Beauty Suit: How My Year of Religious Modesty Made Me a Better Feminist (Beacon Press, 2018).

== Bibliography ==
Trade Books

- Mockingbird: A Portrait of Harper Lee (Henry Holt & Co., 2006)
- And So It Goes: Kurt Vonnegut, A Life (Henry Holt & Co., 2011)
- I Am Scout: The Biography of Harper Lee (Henry Holt & Co., 2008; rev. Christy Ottaviano Books, 2018)
- The Man Who Wrote the Perfect Novel: John Williams, Stoner & the Writing Life (University of Texas Press, 2018)
- Lorraine Hansberry: The Life Behind a Raisin in the Sun (Henry Holt & Co., 2022)
