= New York State Writers Hall of Fame =

- Awarded for: "to highlight the rich literary heritage of the New York State and to recognize the legacy of individual New York State writers."
- Location: Albany, New York, New York
- Country: United States
- Presented by: Empire State Center for the Book and the Empire State Book Festival
- First award: 2010 (16 years ago)

The New York State Writers Hall of Fame or NYS Writers Hall of Fame is a project established in 2010 by the Empire State Center for the Book, which is the New York State affiliate of the U.S. Library of Congress's Center for the Book, and the Empire State Book Festival. Beginning in 2020, the Empire State Center for the Book partners with the New York State Writers Institute in presenting the awards.

The Hall of Fame was established "to highlight the rich literary heritage of the New York State and to recognize the legacy of individual New York State writers." New writers, both living and deceased, have been inducted since 2010.

== List of Hall of Fame members ==
=== Inaugural class of 2010 ===
- James Baldwin (1924–1987)
- Elizabeth Bishop (1911–1979)
- Robert Caro (b. 1935)
- Frederick Douglass (1818–1895)
- Mary Gordon (b. 1949)
- Langston Hughes (1902–1967)
- Zora Neale Hurston (1891–1960)
- Edna St. Vincent Millay (1892–1950)
- Isaac Bashevis Singer (1902–1991)
- Edith Wharton (1862–1937)
- E. B. White (1899–1985)
- Walt Whitman (1819–1892)

=== Class of 2011 ===
- John Ashbery (1927–2017)
- Willa Cather (1873–1947)
- Julia de Burgos (1914–1953)
- Ralph Ellison (1914–1994)
- Paula Fox (1923–2017)
- Lorraine Hansberry (1930–1965)
- Madeleine L'Engle (1918–2007)
- Herman Melville (1819–1891)
- Dorothy Parker (1893–1967)

=== Class of 2012 ===
- John Cheever (1912–1982)
- Hart Crane (1899–1932)
- E. L. Doctorow (1931–2015)
- Edna Ferber (1885–1968)
- Pete Hamill (1935–2020)
- Washington Irving (1783–1859)
- Henry James (1843–1916)
- Mary McCarthy (1912–1989)
- Marianne Moore (1887–1972)
- Toni Morrison (1931–2019)
- Joyce Carol Oates (b. 1938)
- Barbara W. Tuchman (1912–1989)
- Kurt Vonnegut (1922–2007)
- Richard Wright (1908–1960)

=== Class of 2013 ===
- James Fenimore Cooper (1789–1851)
- Countee Cullen (1903–1946)
- Marilyn Hacker (b. 1942)
- Alice McDermott (b. 1953)
- Walter Mosley (b. 1952)
- Miguel Piñero (1946–1988)
- Maurice Sendak (1928–2012)
- Calvin Trillin (b. 1935)

=== Class of 2014 ===
- Russell Banks (1940–2023)
- Mary Higgins Clark (1929–2020)
- Nora Ephron (1941–2012)
- Alice Hoffman (b. 1952)
- Maurice Kenny (1929–2016)
- Rex Stout (1886–1975)
- James Thurber (1894–1961)

=== Class of 2015 ===
- Isaac Asimov (1920?–1992)
- Allen Ginsberg (1926–1997)
- Ezra Jack Keats (1916–1983)
- Dawn Powell (1896–1965)
- Francine Prose (b. 1947)
- David Remnick (b. 1958)
- Colm Tóibín (b. 1955)

=== Class of 2016 ===
- Roger Angell (1920–2022)
- Maya Angelou (1928–2014)
- Roz Chast (b. 1954)
- Samuel R. Delany (b. 1942)
- Jean Craighead George (1919–2012)
- Don Marquis (1878–1937)
- Grace Paley (1922–2007)
- Stephen Sondheim (1930–2021)

=== Class of 2017 ===
- Ron Chernow (b. 1949)
- Alexander Hamilton (1755–1804)
- William Kennedy (b. 1928)
- Christopher Morley (1890–1957)
- Walter Dean Myers (1937–2014)
- Frederick Law Olmsted (1822–1903)
- Lillian Ross (1918–2017)

=== Class of 2018 ===
- Ira Gershwin (1896–1983)
- E. L. Konigsburg (1930–2013)
- Jose Marti (1853–1895)
- Russell Shorto (b. 1959)
- Colson Whitehead (b. 1969)
- Jacqueline Woodson (b. 1963)

=== Class of 2019 ===
- William Cullen Bryant (1794–1878)
- Jennifer Egan (b. 1962)
- Doris Kearns Goodwin (b. 1943)
- Larry Kramer (1935–2020)
- James Patterson (b. 1947)
- Richard Peck (1934–2018)
- Ntozake Shange (1948–2018)

=== Class of 2020/2021 ===
The 2020 induction ceremony was postponed to 2021 because of the coronavirus pandemic.

- Edwidge Danticat (b. 1969)
- Bill Finger (1914–1974)
- Anna Katharine Green (1846–1935)
- Oscar Hammerstein II (1895–1960)
- Andrea Davis Pinkney (b. 1963)
- Lore Segal (1928–2024)
- Garry Trudeau (b. 1948)

=== Class of 2022 ===
- Irving Berlin (1888-1989)
- Min Jin Lee (b. 1968)
- Audre Lorde (1934-1992)
- James McBride (b. 1957)

=== Class of 2023 ===
- Clement Clarke Moore (1779-1863)

=== Class of 2025 ===
- F. Scott Fitzgerald (1896-1940)

=== Class of 2026 ===
- N. K. Jemisin (b. 1972)
- Lawrence Block (b. 1938)
- Kay Thompson (1909-1998)

== See also ==
- List of halls and walks of fame
