= Rachel L. Swarns =

American writer

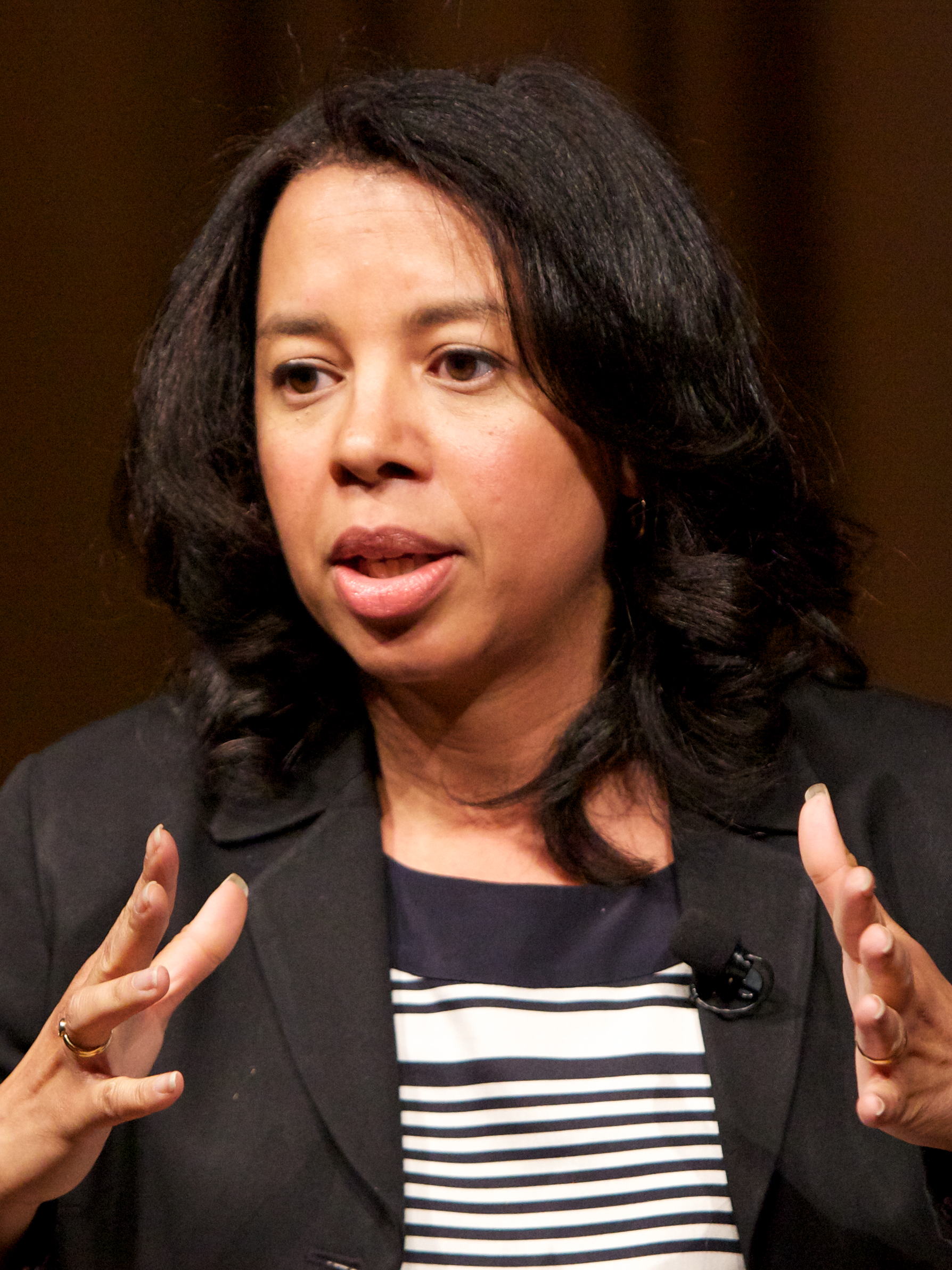
- Swarns in 2012
- Born: 1967 (age 58–59); New York City, U.S.
- Education: Howard University (BA); University of Kent (MA)
- Occupations: Reporter, author, journalism professor

Rachel L. Swarns (born 1967) is an American author, news correspondent and investigative reporter. Since 1995 at The New York Times, Swarns has been a reporter, news correspondent, and since 2017 a faculty member in journalism at New York University. Swarns has been a foreign correspondent for the Times while reporting from Cuba, Russia and southern Africa (where she was the Johannesburg bureau chief). Swarns wrote American Tapestry (2012) about the history of Michelle Obama's ancestors, and co-authored the book Unseen: Unpublished Black History from the New York Times Photo Archives. In 2023, she published The 272: The Families Who Were Enslaved and Sold to Build the American Catholic Church.

== Background ==
Swarns has discussed her background in an interview. She has also written about her family and religious faith in an opinion piece in the New York Times in 2023. In her column, she describes herself as "a Black woman and practicing Catholic." The piece coincides with the publication of her book on how the Catholic Church in the U.S. was deeply entwined with human bondage. Her mother was an immigrant to the U.S. from the Bahamas, raising her children on Staten Island. Catholic activist Dorothy Day of The Catholic Worker was godmother to one of Swarns's uncles.

== Career ==
Before Swarns began working for the New York Times, she worked for the Miami Herald and the Tampa Bay Times (then the St. Petersburg Times). She has covered the justice system, federal courts and policing, including the L.A. riots. She has reported from Cuba and covered Guantanamo Bay and the Cuba visit by former Pope John Paul II. Swarns was part of a team that investigated the aftermath of Hurricane Andrew, which won a Pulitzer Prize. She covered the 2004 and 2008 presidential campaigns.

Swarns did a series of investigative stories in 2016 regarding Georgetown University's connection to slavery, which received nationwide attention. She wrote an investigative series about black professional elites in South Africa, reported on welfare reform policies of Rudy Giuliani, health care, homelessness, racial relations in South Africa, Zimbabwe civil strife, and the Angola civil war.
