= Bernward Joerges =

German academic (born 1937)

Bernward Joerges (born 1 September 1937 in Stuttgart) is a professor of sociology (emeritus) at Technische Universität Berlin and director of the Metropolitan Research Group at Wissenschaftszentrum Berlin. He holds a degree in Psychology (Dipl. Psych.), Dr. phil. and Dr. phil. habil. in Sociology. After early studies of development, environment, consumption and everyday life technology, his major areas of interest are social studies of science and technology, and urban and architectural studies.

He coined the concept of "Konsumarbeit".

He countered an argumentation by Langdon Winner concerning the politics of artifacts illustrated by Robert Moses' bridges of Long Island Parkway.

He was a member of the editorial board of the Sociology of the Sciences Yearbook (since 1989). He is a member of the editorial board of the Jahrbuch für Technikphilosophie. He is a member of the Wissenschsftlicher Beirat of the journal Dialektik, Zeitschrift für Kulturphilosophie.

== Books ==
- Joerges, Bernward (2020) Robotization of Work? Answers from popular culture, media and social sciences (with Barbara Czarniawska). Cheltenham: Edward Elgar. ISBN 978-1-83910-094-9.
- Joerges, Bernward; Nowotny, Helga (2003). Social studies of science and technology: looking back, ahead. Dordrecht: Kluwer Academic Publishers. ISBN 978-1-4020-1481-9.
- Joerges, Bernward; Shinn, Terry (2000). Instrumentation: between science, state, and industry. Boston: Kluwer Academic Publishers. ISBN 978-0-7923-6736-9.
- Bernward Joerges (1997). LogIcons - Bilder zwischen Theorie und Anschauung (mit Ute Hoffmann und Ingrid Severin). Berlin: edition sigma. ISBN 9783894041717.
- Joerges, Bernward (1996). Technik - Körper der Gesellschaft: Arbeiten zur Techniksoziologie. Frankfurt: Suhrkamp. ISBN 978-3-518-28854-2.
- Bernward Joerges (1996). Körper-Technik : Aufsätze zur Organtransplantation. Berlin: edition sigma. ISBN 9783894041601.
- Bernward Joerges (1994). Technik ohne Grenzen (mit Ingo Braun, eds.). Frankfurt: Suhrkamp. ISBN 978-3518287651.
- Bernward Joerges (1992). Sociologie des techniques de la vie quotidienne (ed. avec Alain Gras, Victor Scardigli). Paris: Editions L'Harmattan. ISBN 978-2738413055.
- Bernward Joerges (1988). Technik im Alltag (ed.). Frankfurt: Suhrkamp. ISBN 978-3518283554.
- Bernward Joerges (1987). Public Policies and Private Actions (ed. with Georges Gaskell). London: Gower Publishing. ISBN 0566054361.
- Bernward Joerges (1986). Consumer Behavior and Energy Policy: An International Perspective (ed. with Eric Monnier et al.). London: Praeger. ISBN 978-0275921798.
- Bernward Joerges (1977). Gebaute Umwelt und Verhalten: Über das Verhältnis von Technikwissenschaften und Sozialwissenschaften am Beispiel der Architektur und der Verhaltenstheorie. Baden Baden: Nomos. ISBN 9783789002861.
- Bernward Joerges (1969). Community Development in Entwicklungsländern (mit Sung-Jo Park). Stuttgart: Klett. ASIN: B0000BRSWJ.
