= Linda Leavell =

American writer, scholar, and professor

Linda Leavell is an American writer, scholar, and professor. Her biography of Marianne Moore won the PEN Weld Award for Biography and the Plutarch Award. It was a finalist for the National Book Critics Circle Award.

== Life ==
Leavell graduated from Baylor University and received her PhD in English from Rice University. She was a professor of American literature at Rhodes College for one year and at Oklahoma State University for 24 years.

== Works ==
- Marianne Moore and the Visual Arts: Prismatic Color, Louisiana State University Press, 1995. ISBN 9780807119860
- Holding On Upside Down: The Life and Work of Marianne Moore Farrar, Straus and Giroux, 2013. ISBN 9780374710996
