= Lem Billings =

Kennedy family associate (1916–1981)

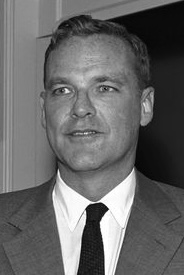
- Billings in 1962
- Born: Kirk LeMoyne Billings; April 15, 1916; Pittsburgh, Pennsylvania, U.S.
- Died: May 28, 1981 (aged 65); Manhattan, New York, U.S.
- Burial place: Allegheny Cemetery
- Education: Princeton University; Harvard University
- Occupation: Businessman

Kirk LeMoyne "Lem" Billings (April 15, 1916 – May 28, 1981) was an American businessman known for his close, long-standing friendship with John F. Kennedy and the Kennedy family. A graduate of Choate, Billings earned a bachelor's degree from Princeton University and a master's degree in business administration from Harvard University. He served in the AFS ambulance service and the U.S. Naval Reserve during World War II and later had a long career in advertising. Billings was a preparatory school roommate of Kennedy's, an usher at his wedding, and a campaigner for his successful 1960 presidential bid. During Kennedy's presidency, Billings acted as an unofficial aide to Kennedy and was a frequent visitor to the White House. Later, Billings assisted Sargent Shriver as a trustee of the Kennedy family trusts.

== Early life, education, and military service ==
Billings was born in Pittsburgh on April 15, 1916, the third child of Frederic Tremaine Billings (1873–1933) and Romaine LeMoyne (1882–1970). His father was a prominent physician and a graduate of the U.S. Naval Academy. His mother was a Mayflower descendant and his great-grandfather, Francis Julius LeMoyne, was a prominent abolitionist who helped establish LeMoyne–Owen College. The Billings family were Episcopalians and Republicans.

Billings attended Choate, arriving at the school shortly after the death of his father. His father's death had left his family impoverished, and he attended Choate on scholarship. Billings graduated from Choate in 1935. He was a member of the Choate crew team.

In 1939, Billings graduated from Princeton University, majoring in art and architecture. He wrote his senior thesis on Tintoretto. He was a member of the Ivy eating club.

In 1941, Billings failed medical tests required for admission to the U.S. military during World War II. In 1942, supported by a recommendation from Joseph P. Kennedy Sr., he was accepted by the AFS ambulance service, where his poor eyesight was not a disqualification. He was deployed to North Africa from 1942 to 1943. In 1944, he received a commission in the U.S. Naval Reserve and served in the South Pacific until being discharged in 1946.

From 1946 to 1948, Billings attended Harvard Business School. He earned an MBA there.

== Career ==
Billings sold Coca-Cola dispensers to drugstores and worked at a General Shoe store. As Vice President at the Emerson Drug Company in Baltimore, he invented the 1950s fad drink Fizzies by adding a fruit flavor to disguise the sodium citrate taste. In 1958, Billings moved to the prominent Manhattan advertising firm Lennen & Newell as an advertising executive. He had a lengthy career in advertising.

== Association with John F. Kennedy and the Kennedy family ==
Billings, then a 16-year-old third-year student, met John F. Kennedy, a 15-year-old second-year student, at Choate in the fall of 1933. "From all accounts it was instant friendship. They were bound together by a love of fun and practical jokes, resentment of Choate, and envy of their higher-achieving elder siblings -- Joe, Jack's brother, and Josh, Lem's brother". At Choate, they formed a club and called themselves "The Muckers". The Muckers would pull pranks around the school. They planned to dump horse manure in the school gym, but that plan fell through after the headmaster found out about it.

Some historians believe that Billings expressed sexual interest in Kennedy in writing in 1934 and that Kennedy politely rebuffed his advances. Kennedy was aware that a fellow Choate student had revealed Billings' homosexual behavior during their time there.

Billings' first visit with the Kennedy family was for Christmas in Palm Beach in 1933. He went on to become a close friend of the Kennedys who participated in Kennedy family events. Joseph Kennedy described Billings as his "second son". Billings repeated his senior year so that he and Kennedy could graduate from Choate together.

Billings roomed with Kennedy during Kennedy's short tenure as a student at Princeton in 1935; Kennedy left the university for health reasons in December 1935 and later attended Harvard. In the summer of 1937, Billings and Kennedy took a nine-week summer trip through Europe which solidified their friendship.

After working on Kennedy's successful campaign for Congress in 1946, Billings toured seven Latin American countries with Robert F. Kennedy.

On September 12, 1953, Billings was an usher at the wedding of Jacqueline Lee Bouvier and Kennedy. In 1956, he was an usher at the wedding of Kennedy's sister Jean to Stephen Edward Smith.

In 1960, Billings worked on Kennedy's presidential campaign. He managed the campaign in the Third Congressional District in the Wisconsin primary and then served as a general troubleshooter and coordinator of television in the West Virginia primary.

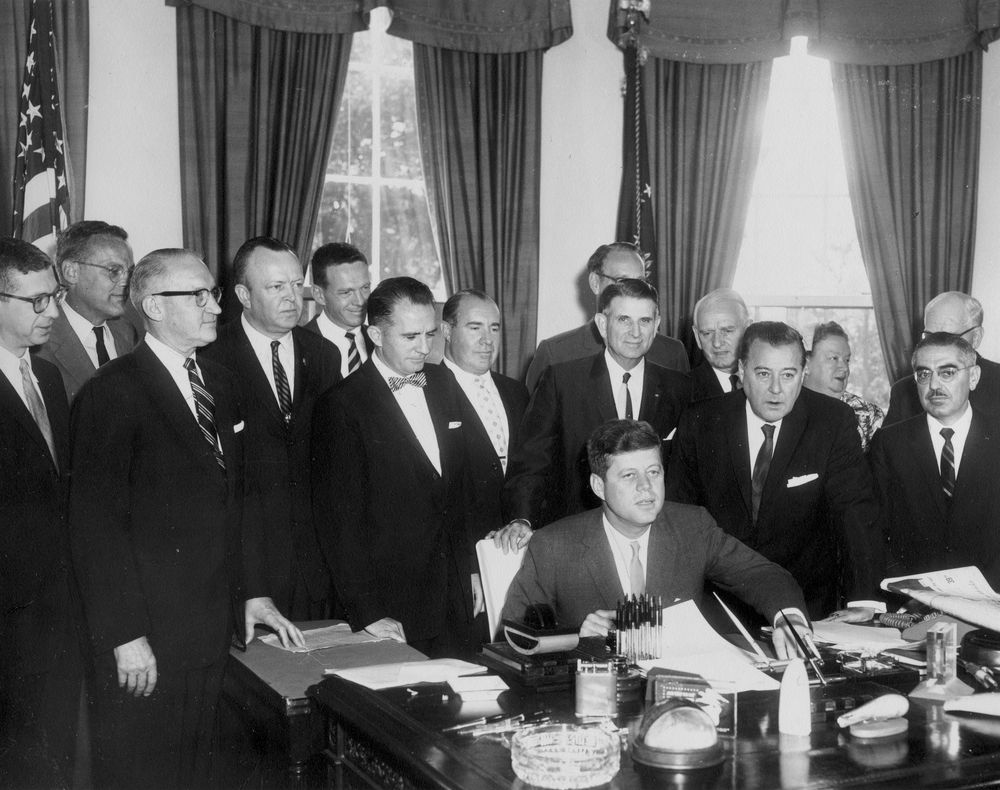
Billings (second from left) at the White House as Kennedy signs legislation creating the U.S. Travel Service

In 1961, Billings declined Kennedy's offers to appoint him the first head of the Peace Corps, director of a new agency to promote tourism, the U.S. Travel Service, or ambassador to Denmark. He later said: "I realized that I did not want to work for the president—because I felt it would change our relationship." In September 1961, he accepted an appointment to the board of trustees of the planned National Cultural Center, which later became the Kennedy Center. The next year, Kennedy named Billings to the board planning America's participation in the New York World's Fair of 1964–1965. He represented Kennedy when the Choate alumni association unveiled Kennedy's portrait in May 1963.

Billings visited the White House on most weekends during the Kennedy Administration. When a butler commented on the fact that Billings was leaving his belongings in one of the third-floor guest rooms, Jacqueline Kennedy replied: "He's been my house guest since I was married." Sometimes he stayed for longer periods. When Jacqueline Kennedy was away, Billings organized White House dinner parties for Kennedy and old friends. When Kennedy traveled, he kept Jacqueline Kennedy company. One presidential aide later said that "some people saw him so much they thought he was the Secret Service." Billings never had a White House pass; on this topic, he said: "Jack and Jackie were so nice about this that I didn't even have to tell them whether I was coming or going." Historian Sally Bedell Smith compared him to Leonard Zelig, a nondescript character in Woody Allen's 1983 film Zelig who is always present in the back row at major events.

The press frequently reported on his presence at Kennedy family events, such as the arrival of the Kennedy children in Washington in February 1961. He accompanied Kennedy to church, launched a kite for Kennedy's daughter Caroline, and delivered pet hamsters to the Kennedy children. He joined Kennedy's entourage for his tours of Europe in both 1961 and 1963. In 1962, he escorted two of Kennedy's sisters, Eunice Shriver and Jean Kennedy Smith, around Europe for two weeks. When the Kennedys spent the weekend at Glen Ora, their Virginia estate, Jacqueline Kennedy invited Billings to join them more often than Kennedy did. She needed Billings to keep Kennedy company while she went horseback riding.

Billings' role as "first friend" was assessed by many observers at the time and since. Ted Sorensen called him "an admirer — almost a fawning admirer — of his friend." Arthur Schlesinger thought Billings "used to glare at me when we occasionally encountered each other in the company of JFK, and for a time I took this rather personally. Soon I discovered that he glared with equal suspicion at anyone whose friendship with JFK post-dated his own."

Most recognized that Billings and Kennedy had been friends from youth and did not question their relationship or Billings' presence. Ben Bradlee, a Kennedy friend who worked at Newsweek during the Kennedy Administration (and later, as editor of The Washington Post), was no friend of Billings, yet observed "they were childhood friends and stayed loyal to each other forever." Billings, he said, "had a natural jealousy. He didn't want to share his friendship with Jack." Gore Vidal, who was banned from the White House after a run-in with Billings, was critical of Billings; however, he acknowledged that Billings played an important role as an aide to Kennedy, who was often ill or in pain. According to Vidal, Kennedy "needed Lem Billings to get around" because being accompanied by a nurse would have made his political career impossible. Vidal believed Billings loved Kennedy.

Many testify to Billings' wit and ability to help Kennedy relax. He once described the Kennedy family's lack of business awareness: "Listening to the Kennedy brothers talk about business was like hearing nuns talk about sex." Billings also served Kennedy as an artistic adviser, selecting scrimshaw for display in the Oval Office and, on one European tour, quickly assembling a selection of artworks to be presented as gifts.

Charles L. Bartlett, the journalist who introduced Kennedy to Jacqueline Bouvier and was a friend of both Billings and Kennedy, described their relationship this way: "Lem was a stable presence for Jack. Lem's raison d'être was Jack Kennedy. I don't think it's true that he did not have views of his own, as some have said. He had a very independent mind. He had interests of his own that Jack didn't necessarily share. He certainly didn't have the same interest in politics and women that Jack had."

Kennedy "made a big difference in my life," Billings said. "Because of him, I was never lonely."

Billings spent the last weekend of October 1963 with the Kennedys. This was the last time he saw them together. Billings saw Kennedy for the last time when they dined at the White House with Greta Garbo on November 13, 1963, nine days before Kennedy was assassinated in Dallas.

=== After the JFK assassination ===
Billings was devastated by Kennedy's death. He participated in the funeral procession with the Kennedy family.

In 1964, Billings was named to select a memorial to Kennedy to be placed in the Kennedy Center. In 1965, Jacqueline Kennedy invited Billings to accompany her and her children to England for the unveiling of a memorial to Kennedy at Runnymede.

Billings escorted Jean Kennedy Smith to a gala ballet performance in 1966 and Ethel Kennedy, Robert F. Kennedy's widow, to the 1971 opening of the Kennedy Center.

Billings frequently socialized with Bobby Kennedy Jr. (to whom he became almost a surrogate father) and Christopher Lawford. However, the elder Kennedys began to discourage the boys from associating with Billings because of his excessive recreational drug use (including alcohol).

Billings served for many years along with Sargent Shriver as a trustee for the Kennedy family trusts, working from an office in the Pan Am Building. Jacqueline Kennedy Onassis included Billings as a guest at a party marking the birthdays of her children Caroline (21st) and John Jr. (18th) in 1978.

== Personal life ==
Billings was gay, but was not open to discussing his sexuality.

Billings once said that his friendship with Kennedy may have been the reason that he never married.

Billings was interested in art and interior design.

After the assassination of Robert F. Kennedy in 1968, Billings became depressed and started to drink in excess. Alcoholism plagued him for most of his life. Following the JFK assassination, one historian described Billings as "probably the saddest of the Kennedy 'widows'." His behavior changed drastically in the late 1960s. According to Kennedy family members (such as Peter Lawford) and others, Billings began using drugs due to the influence of the Kennedy and Lawford boys.

== Death ==
On May 28, 1981, Billings died in his sleep following a heart attack in his Manhattan apartment.

Billings's dying wish was for the young Kennedy men to carry his casket to its final resting place. When they arrived at the cemetery, it was already in place to be lowered. The young Kennedys took the casket and carried it around the gravesite before returning it to the burial plot.

Robert F. Kennedy Jr.'s eulogy of Billings included the following remarks: "'I don't know how we will carry on without him. In many ways, Lem was like a father to me and he was the best friend I will ever have'". Eunice Kennedy Shriver added, "'I'm sure he's already organizing everything in heaven so it will be completely ready for us -- with just the right Early American furniture, the right curtains, the right rugs, the right paintings, and everything ready for a big, big party'".

Billings is buried in Allegheny Cemetery in Pittsburgh.

== Literature ==
- John F. Kennedy; Kirk LeMoyne Billings, Das geheime Tagebuch: Europa 1937, Oliver Lubrich (Hrsg.), Wien, DVB Verlag, 2021, ISBN 978-3-903244-18-4
- Jack and Lem - John F. Kennedy and Lem Billings - The Untold Story of an Extraordinary Friendship, David Pitts, New York, Da Capo Press, 2007, ISBN 978-0-78671-989-1
- Jackie and Me: a Novel, Louis Bayard, Workman Publishing, New York, 2022, ISBN 978-1-64375-035-4

== See also ==
- JFK: Reckless Youth

== Sources ==
- Peter Collier and David Horowitz, The Kennedys: An American Drama (San Francisco: Encounter Books, 2002)
- Nigel Hamilton, JFK: Reckless Youth (NY: Random House, 1992)
- David Michaelis, The Best of Friends: Profiles of Extraordinary Friendships (NY: Morrow, 1983)
- Geoffrey Perret, Jack: A Life Like No Other (NY: Random House, 2002)
- Sally Bedell Smith, Grace and Power: The Private World of the Kennedy White House (NY: Random House, 2004)
- David Pitts, Jack and Lem: The Untold Story of an Extraordinary Friendship (NY: Carroll & Graf, 2007), ISBN 978-0-7867-1989-1
- Gore Vidal, Palimpsest (NY: Random House, 1995)
