= Gail Godwin =

Novelist, short story writer (born 1937)

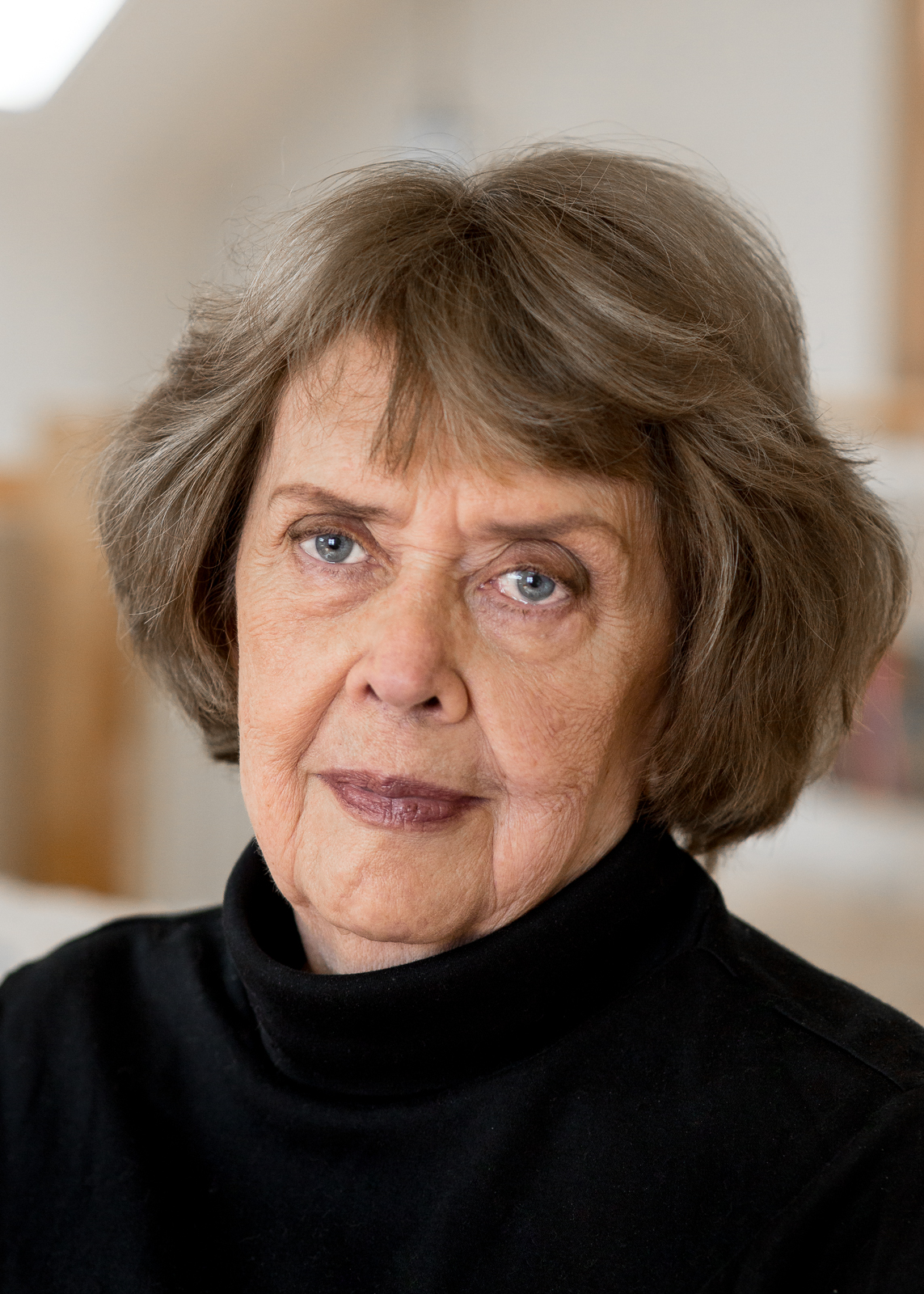
- Born: Gail Kathleen Godwin; June 18, 1937 (age 89); Birmingham, Alabama, U.S.
- Education: University of North Carolina at Chapel Hill; University of Iowa (MA, PhD)
- Occupation: Author
- Partner: Robert Starer
- Writing career
- Genres: Fiction; autobiography
- Notable works: A Mother and Two Daughters (1982); A Southern Family (1987)
- Notable awards: Three-time National Book Award nominee
- Website: www.gailgodwin.com

Gail Godwin (born June 18, 1937) is an American novelist and short story writer. Godwin has written 14 novels, two short story collections, three non-fiction books, and ten libretti. Her primary literary accomplishments are her novels, which have included five best-sellers and three finalists for the National Book Award. Most of her books are realistic fiction novels that follow a character's psychological and intellectual development, often based on themes taken from Godwin's own life.

Godwin was born in Birmingham, Alabama, but raised mostly in Asheville, North Carolina by her mother and grandmother. She adopted her mother's interest in writing at an early age and obtained a bachelor's degree in journalism from the University of North Carolina at Chapel Hill (UNC). After graduating, she worked briefly as a reporter for The Miami Herald, then traveled to Europe and worked for the U.S. Travel Service run by the U.S. Embassy in London. She returned to the U.S. after six years. Godwin taught English at the University of Iowa, while earning her M.A. (1968) and Ph.D. (1971) in English Literature.

While at the University of Iowa, Godwin's dissertation became her first novel, The Perfectionists. By 1976 she had become a successful writer and author of three books. In particular, two books written by her in the 1980s, A Mother and Two Daughters (1982) and A Southern Family (1987), resulted in further acclaim and expanded the readership of her books. Following The Finishing School (1984), readership of her books dramatically declined until 2006, when Queen of the Underworld was published. Flora (2013) became one of her more commercially successful novels.

== Early life and family ==
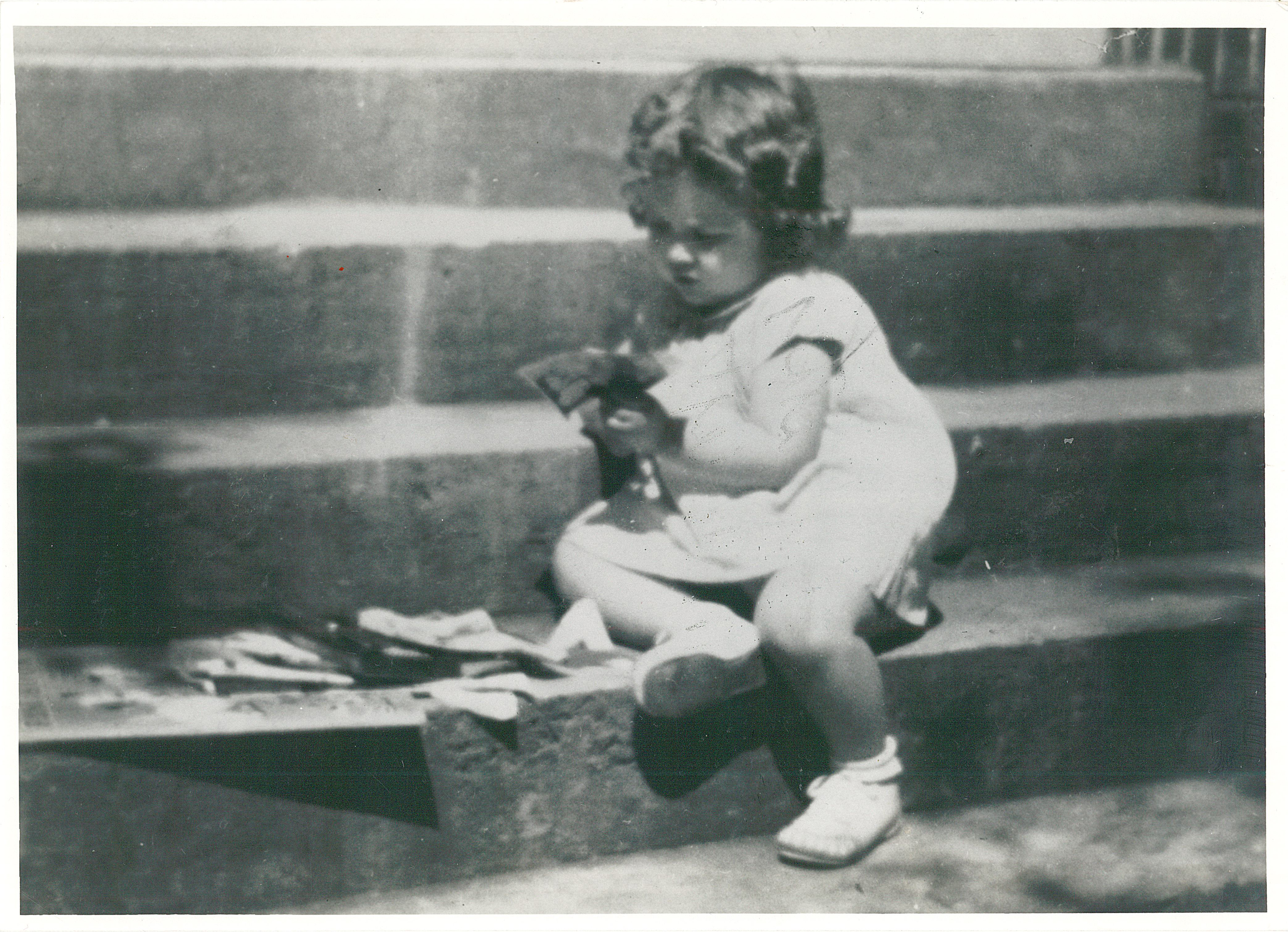
Gail Godwin at three years of age

Gail Godwin was born on June 18, 1937, in Birmingham, Alabama. Her parents, Kathleen Krahenbuhl and Mose Winston Godwin, were both from North Carolina, but visiting cousins in Alabama when Godwin was born. Godwin's parents divorced two years later. After the breakup, Gail and her mother moved in with her grandparents in Durham, North Carolina. They moved again to Weaverville, NC and then to Asheville, NC. Her grandfather died in 1939, so Godwin was raised by her mother and grandmother in Asheville, where they lived until 1948.

Godwin's grandmother filled the traditional role of a mother, cleaning, cooking and sewing, while her mother was the breadwinner. Godwin's mother had a Bachelor's and master's degree from University of North Carolina at Chapel Hill. She taught college-level English in the mornings, and worked as a reporter for a local paper, Asheville Citizen-Times, in the evenings. On the weekends she wrote love stories for magazines in New York. According to Godwin, growing up with two female guardians had an influence on her writing and her decision to become a writer. By age five she had started identifying with her mother's occupation as a writer more so than her grandmother's work. At nine years old Godwin wrote her first story, titled "Ollie McGonnigle".

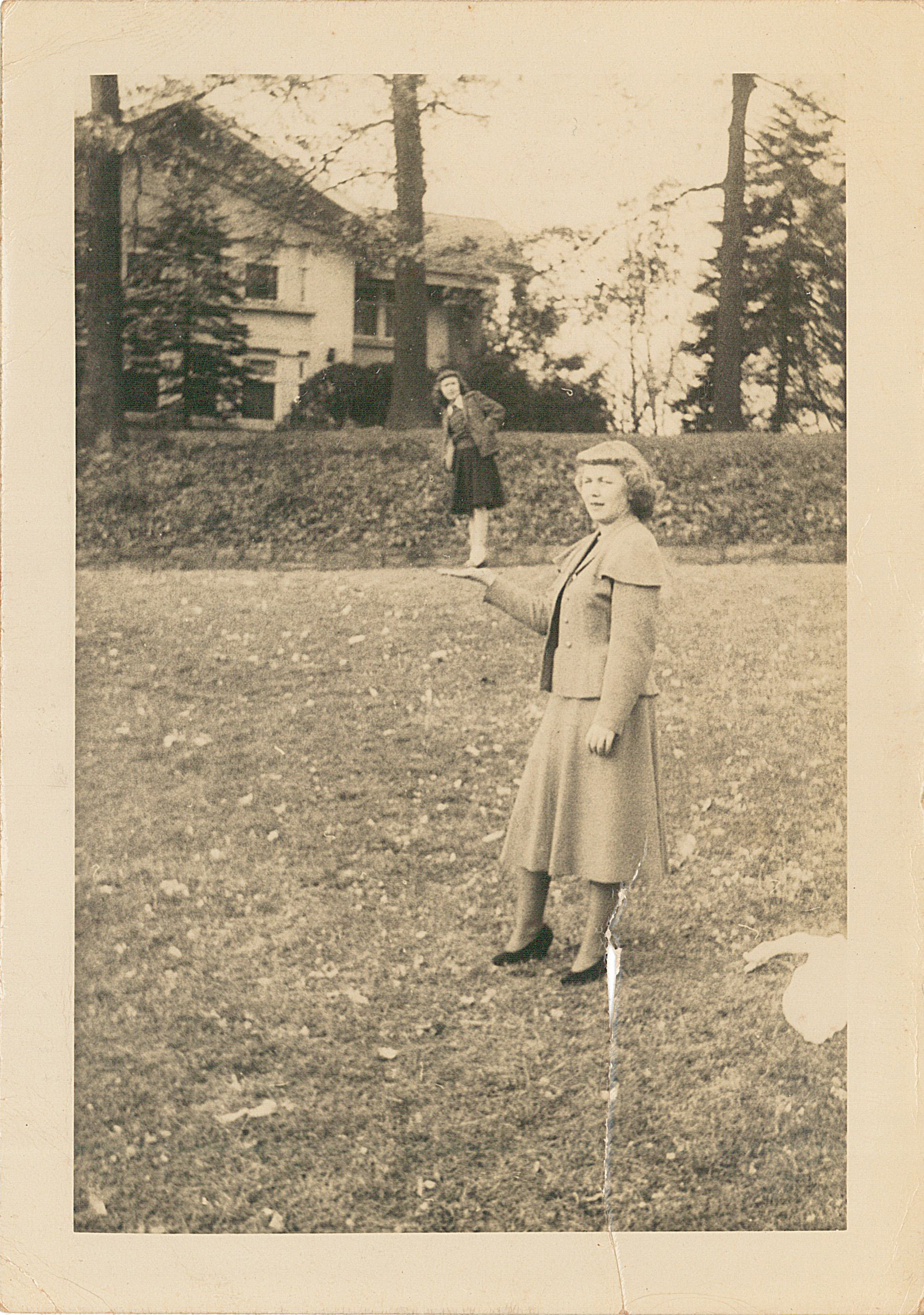
Gail Godwin at age 13 with her mother

In 1948 Kathleen married Frank Cole, a World War II veteran, and moved the family to Virginia. Godwin was further inspired by her mother's determination to continue writing after having a second child. According to Godwin, much of her time growing up was spent in the newsroom, where her mother worked. She also witnessed her mother's plays and novels being rejected. Godwin's autobiography creates the impression that much of her own writing was intended to accomplish the things her mother could not. As Cole's salary increased and he was able to support the family, Godwin's mother focused on being a wife and homemaker, eventually not writing at all.

In Godwin's late teens, her stepfather was working as a salesman and the family moved often. Godwin attended several different high schools, including an all-girls Catholic school, St. Genevieve-of-the-Pines. It was Godwin's favorite teacher at St. Genevieve-of-the-Pines who persuaded her to start keeping a personal diary. According to Godwin, she had a "church upbringing or convent school training." She attended church at St. Mary's and All Souls. She also wrote a short novel as a teenager.

Godwin had no relationship with her father, until the two re-connected at her high school graduation. Godwin's father then offered to pay for her college education. During her junior year in college, Godwin moved in with her father, who committed suicide later that year. Godwin's uncle (Note: Her uncle's obituary says he died in the hospital after suffering a stroke) and a half brother later committed suicide as well. Her mother died in a car accident in 1989.

Godwin attended Peace College in Raleigh, North Carolina from 1955 to 1957. She then transferred to University of North Carolina (UNC), where she attended from 1957 to 1959, graduating with a bachelor's degree in journalism. While in college she worked on The Otherwise Virgins, a novel her mother had written, but was unable to find a publisher for. In 1959 Knopf sent an agent to UNC to scout young writers. Godwin submitted a portion of her novel Windy Peaks for their consideration. The story was about the staff and guests at a resort hotel in the mountains. Her manuscript was rejected. Godwin also worked as a waitress at Mayview Manor at Blowing Rock, North Carolina during her sophomore and junior years.

== Early work ==
Godwin's first job out of college was at The Miami Herald, where she worked as a journalist for one year. There she met and briefly married photographer and co-worker, Douglas Kennedy. They were married in 1960 and divorced several months later in 1961. According to Godwin, she "worked very hard", but her stories were too "flamboyant" for the publication and she was fired. According to Contemporary Literary Criticism, she was incorporating too much human interest into the paper's stories, which were supposed to be factual. After briefly living with her mother again, Godwin moved to London to distance herself from a failed marriage and job.

In London Godwin worked for the U.S. Travel Service run by the American embassy from 1961 to 1965. Godwin said she was a "glorified receptionist," who was able to read books in secret while at work. Her cousin, who was the mayor of Weaverville, North Carolina, helped to get her the job. While she was employed by the embassy, Godwin completed a novel entitled Gull Key. Like many of her early works, the book focuses on a female character figuring out if marriage and being a parent is the life she wants for herself. Several publishers rejected the novel and the manuscript was lost when Godwin sent the only copy to a publisher that went out of business without returning it.

While in England, Godwin took a course in creative writing at the City Literature Institute, where she met her second husband, psychiatrist Ian Marshall. They were married two months later. The marriage was brief and they were divorced in 1966. After their breakup, Godwin returned to the United States. At age 29, she took a job as fact-checker in New York City for The Saturday Evening Post. She said the job was embarrassing, because she wanted to be a writer, as opposed to fact-checking the work of others.

At this point, a distant uncle of Godwin's died, leaving her an inheritance of $5,000. She used the money to apply to the Iowa Writers Workshop and, after being accepted, to move from New York to Iowa City in 1967. There Godwin met her teacher and future mentor Kurt Vonnegut. At Iowa, Godwin worked as an instructor while earning an M.A. and Ph.D. from the same university in 1968 and 1971 respectively. She began teaching Greek Drama, before earning a position teaching literature. By age 30, Godwin had written three novels, but was unable to get any of them published.

== Author ==
=== Early published work ===
According to The Asheville Citizen-Times, Godwin's first successful work was a 1969 short story in Cosmopolitan. Her first published novel was her dissertation written as graduate work at University of Iowa. It was published in 1970 and called The Perfectionists. The story was based loosely on Godwin's second marriage. It was accepted by Harper & Row in December 1968, while Godwin completing her graduate work. From 1971 on, Godwin earned a living through her work as a writer and augmented her income by means of intermittent teaching positions.

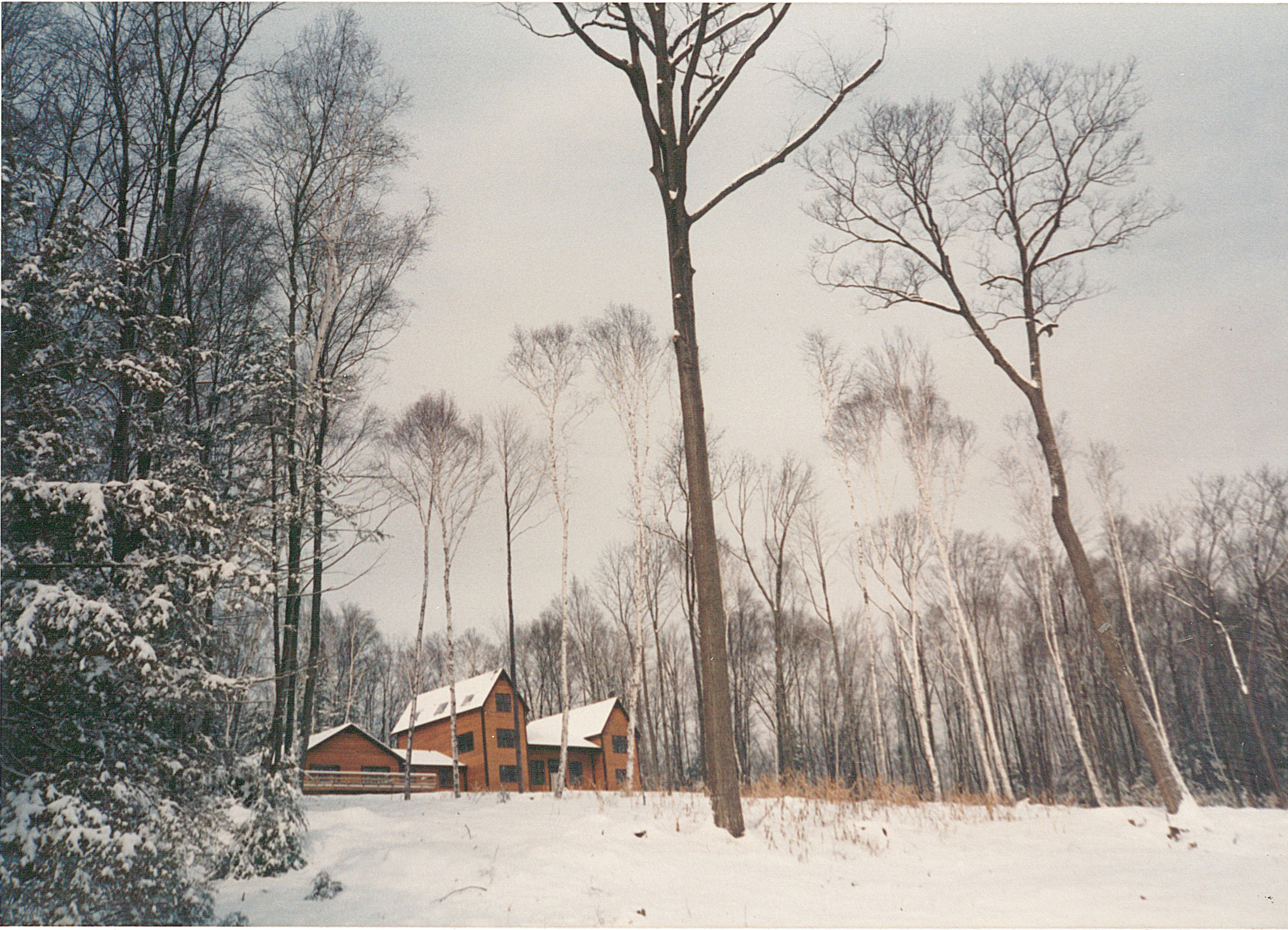
The house in Woodstock, New York, where Godwin completed many of her books

After completing her graduate work in 1971, Godwin spent two months at the Yaddo artist's colony in Upstate New York in 1972. There she wrote 100 pages of a novel called The Villain, which was never published. The work was scrapped, but ended up being part of the basis for The Odd Woman. According to author Jane Hill, it was while working on The Odd Women that Godwin transitioned from linear narratives to more complex structures where the plot interweaves past and present events.

It was at Yaddo that Godwin met composer Robert Starer and began a life partnership with him that lasted until his death in 2001. They moved to Stone Ridge, New York in 1973 and later built a house in Woodstock, New York, where Godwin continued her work from home. In addition to her books and short stories, Godwin wrote libretti for ten of Starer's musical compositions.

=== Height of Godwin's career ===
By 1976 Godwin was a successful writer and novelist who had published three books: The Perfectionists, Glass People, and The Odd Woman. The Odd Woman was the longest and most widely recognized of the three. Several short stories by Godwin were published in prominent magazines like Harper's Esquire, Ms. and The Paris Review, where she was often featured on the cover. Godwin was awarded grants from the National Endowment for the Arts (1975–76) and the John Simon Guggenheim Memorial Foundation (1975–76).

Throughout her career, Godwin worked consistently with her agent, John Hawkins, but worked with several different publishing houses. Godwin's early books were published by Knopf. After the editor for The Perfectionists, David Segal, died suddenly of a heart attack, Robert Gottlieb from Knopf became her editor for her next four books. Godwin credits Gottlieb for much of the success of her early works. Later on, when Godwin's then-recent books were less widely read, USA Today commented that this could be in part because she was no longer working with Gottlieb. After Knopf, Godwin contracted with Viking, who offered larger advances and more publicity for her books.

During the years 1982 to 1991, Godwin produced another collection of short fiction and four more novels. According to Publishers Weekly, it was A Mother and Two Daughters (1982) and A Southern Family (1987) that substantially expanded her readership. These novels remained on bestseller lists for an extended period of time. Godwin's earlier works had sold an average of less than 8,000 copies, while A Mother and Two Daughters sold more than 1.5 million. It was the most popular of Godwin's early works and the first time she had written a narrative from the point-of-view of multiple characters. In 1987, Godwin was awarded the Janet Heidinger Kafka Prize for her work on The Southern Family.

By the early 2000s, five of Godwin's books had made The New York Times Best Seller list and three were finalists for the National Book Award.

=== Recent works ===
By 1999 Godwin had published ten novels. In 2001, Godwin's partner, Robert Starer, died and she began writing a fictional story based on their life called Evenings at Five that was published two years later. In November 2004 Godwin signed a contract with the publisher Ballantine Books for her next four books.

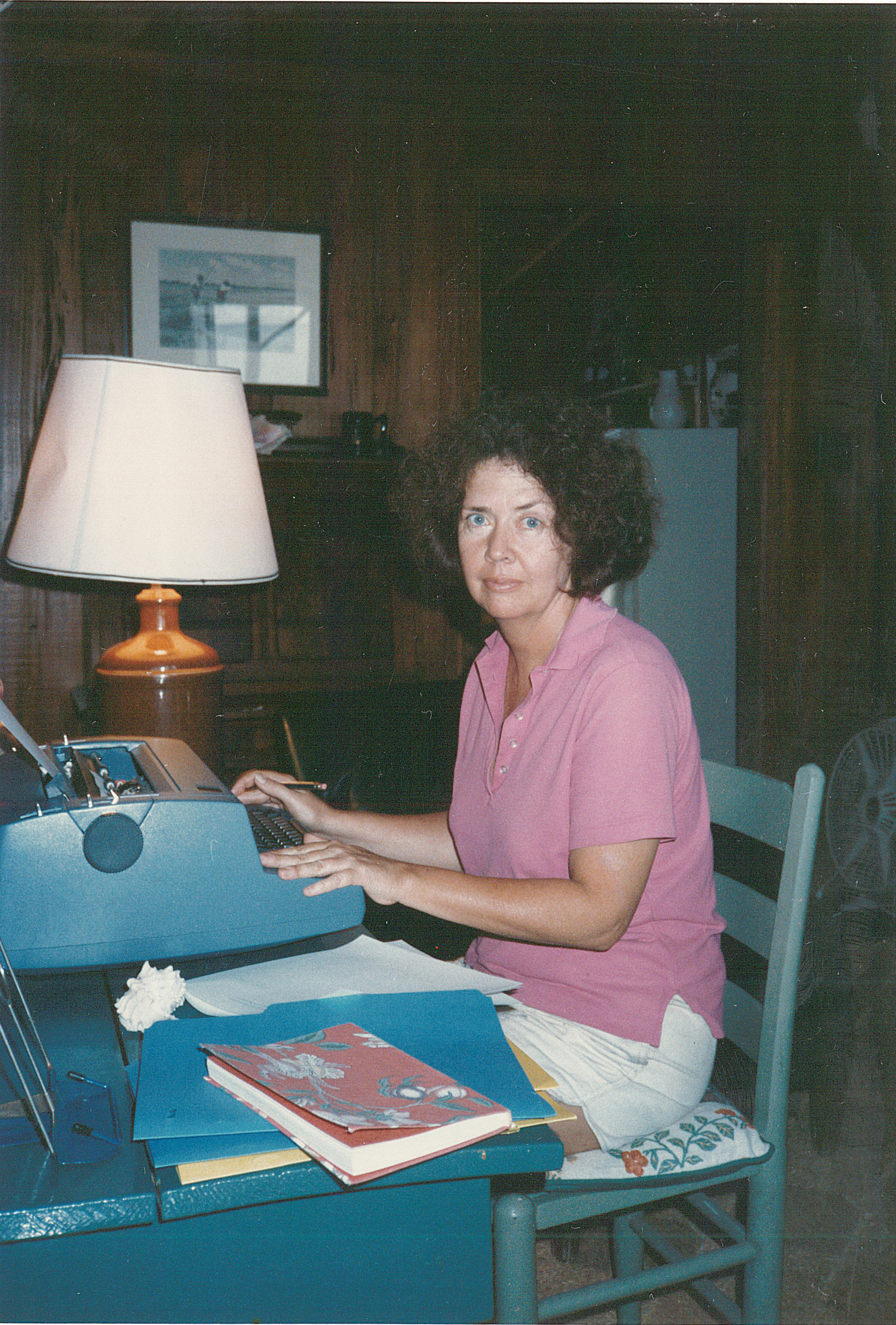
Gail Godwin writing The Finishing School on a typewriter in 1983.

According to Publishers Weekly, Godwin had "achieved a huge degree of success" and still had many devoted readers, but by 1999 she was "no longer the draw she once was." By 2006 The Finishing School (1984) was her last major, commercially successful book, which was followed by a drop in readership. According to Godwin, she was "one of the many authors to be caught in the tumult while [the publishing industry] thrashed about in search of a new business model." The Los Angeles Times said her characters that were progressive working women in the 1970s and 1980s, were now considered "tame" in a modern context.

Kirkus Reviews said Godwin had "a couple of subpar efforts," until publishing Queen of the Underworld in 2006. Flora (2013) became one of her better selling books. Godwin also authored an autobiography, Publishing that appeared in 2015. The Los Angeles Times said her auto-biography was a "preemptive strike" after she was approached by an independent biographer. As of 2015, Godwin's published works have included 14 novels, two collections of short stories, three non-fiction works, and ten libretti.

=== Academia and other work ===
According to The Intellectual in Twentieth-Century Southern Literature, Godwin was unusual in that she was a popular novelist that was also working in academia. Godwin taught at the University of Illinois Center for Advanced Studies from 1971 to 1972. During her time as an author, she was also a lecturer at the Iowa Writers' Workshop (1972 to 1973), Vassar College (1977), and Columbia University (1978/1981). She acted as chair of the fiction panel for the National Book Awards in 1986 and 2008. In 1989, Godwin also founded a small publishing house called St. Hilda's Press. It published religious texts not printed by more commercialized publishers. She later became a Distinguished Alumna of the University of North Carolina and the University of Iowa.

== Themes ==
Most of Godwin's works are based on themes or events taken from her own life. The characters, settings and narratives vary from novel-to-novel, but common topics have included family, the position of women in society and relationships, a woman's artistic and career pursuits, and the role of religious faith. According to The Intellectual in Twentieth-Century Southern Literature, Godwin's characters "struggle intellectually to navigate the mazes of race, class, gender, family, faith and religion." According to Contemporary Literary Criticism, "she writes about issues pertaining to women - male-female roles, marriage, family, personal freedom, self-concept, and self-actualization." Author Jane Hill said Godwin's books are about co-existing with authorities, the role of decision-making in life, careers as an artist, and the consequences of thwarted ambition. Much of her emphasis is on the concept of the self and one's struggles with society.

Most of the academic analysis of Godwin's work focuses on challenges her characters have as women. According to Contemporary Fiction Writers of the South, a typical protagonist in Godwin's novels is a young woman that "in search of herself, confronts obstacles caused by her family, her lovers, her husband, or her own inanition as she struggles to establish her independence and secure her identity through her work." The main character may be personally flawed, then achieve self-reflection or personal growth thanks to the support of their community or a mentor. Main characters often make poor choices, but become a better person, learn to make better decisions and build stronger bonds often as a result of intellectual pursuits. According to critic Anne Cheney, the protagonist may be "searching for happiness, academic or artistic achievement, love, respect, or, more generally, meaning in life."

According to Warren French from the University of Wales, Godwin's works are most often seen as having two primary themes: gender roles and southern settings. French said Godwin herself disapproves of being categorized, which she feels creates "externally imposed limitations" on the themes she covers. However scholars continue to attempt to put her work into a distinctive literary category. In her early works Godwin was seen as a "woman" writer, because her books appealed to a mostly female audience and because she is a woman. After publishing A Southern Family she began being identified as a southern writer. According to The Times (London), Godwin has a "pesky resistance to categorisation" and she often changes themes even after being commercially successful with one. Academic Lihong Xie said Godwin could be identified with the literary tradition of the Bildungsroman, which focuses on the moral and psychological development of a character. Many other critics posit that a quest for meaning and self-identification are Godwin's primary themes.

Other themes in Godwin's work have included escaping the cultural expectations of becoming a "southern lady," childhood abandonment, depression and suicide, racial discrimination, social class and succeeding without a male companion. Her work has spanned different literary categories, such as realism, fantasy and allegory.

=== Early works ===
All of Godwin's books written from 1970 to 1990 are fictional stories based on themes taken from Godwin's life. Her early works focus on women hoping for a relationship with a male companion, but at the same time wanting independence and freedom. The main protagonist is often restricted by family, tradition and patriarchy. Most of Godwin's early works include a prominent mother-daughter relationship as well.

Her first three books, The Perfectionists (1970), Glass People (1972) and The Odd Woman (1974), have protagonists who find that their relationship with a male companion restricts their personal and professional development. The first two books are each about a female character who feels trapped in an unhappy marriage. According to Contemporary Southern Writers, "unlike fairy tale romances, these novels present a realistic depiction of feminist concerns and struggles." Lihong Xie comments that Godwin's protagonists are southern women that "caught between the ideal of southern womanhood and contemporary feminism, struggle to form a personal identity ..."

Violet Clay (1978) and A Mother and Two Daughters (1982) are each about an unmarried protagonist's career in a creative profession. In A Mother and Two Daughters the main character resists the temptation to get married and chooses instead to focus on her work. A Mother and Two Daughters and A Southern Family (1987) each depend heavily on a southern setting and employ themes traditionally associated with social problems in the South. Some of their themes include racial discrimination, social-economic class and the cultural differences between generations. Many characters struggle to reduce the gap between the rich and poor or try to break free from a dominant cultural tradition, with mixed success.

In Godwin's early books, the female protagonists tend to be fearful, passive and repeating of their mistakes. The protagonist is often depicted as a victim who has failed to achieve independence and is struggling to form a personal identity that could exist beyond that of their relationship with a male companion. In her next books, Godwin begins to introduce stronger and more independent central characters. Violet Clay (1978) for example, features a more assertive character than those in prior novels. According to Susan S. Kissel Adams from Northern Kentucky University, Godwin's later characters:

come to value inclusion and connection over exclusion and isolation in their lives. They seek ways to combine their private and their public selves, open and extend family structures, take political action, and fulfill their social responsibilities ... In their struggle against southern codes and family structures that retain a powerful hold even in the late twentieth century. Godwin's daughters of the South grow from a state of dependency and arrested development: they begin to embark on mature, adult lives of their own.

=== Later works ===
As in her earlier novels, Godwin's work in the 1970s and 1980s still centers mostly on difficulties female characters experienced as women. However, she departs from this theme in The Finishing School (1984), which is about two women of different generations and the student-mentor relationship between them, rather than their relationship with men. According to Lihong Xie, Godwin's work during this period continues to be about "the female self" and a woman's intimate relationships with husbands, fathers and God.

Godwin's books begin to incorporate religious themes starting with Father Melancholy's Daughter (1991). The novel is told from the perspective of multiple characters, each of whom has a different perspective on religion. Father Melancholy's Daughter was followed by several books that centered on the Episcopal church and Christian practices. In these novels female and male characters have a more equal influence on the events and plot than in prior novels. Godwin's books neither evangelize nor mock the practices of the Episcopal Church, but rather treat it as a routine aspect of life, or as a subject of intellectual interest. During these years Godwin's books continued to show father figures who have died or are absent. By 1996 two of her books had fathers that died and five had stepfathers that are depicted as intruding on the mother-daughter relationship.

According to Narrative Magazine, Godwin transitions from female protagonists who are "looking for ways to get out of traps and confinements" to those who make "interesting or dangerous life choices." Some of Godwin's later works depict successful, but unconventional marriages. In The Good Husband (1994) both partners accept the wife's career as having a priority over the husband's. The Good Husband is also a return to the theme of marriage that is typical of some of Godwin's earlier works. According to Contemporary Southern Writers, The Good Husband "explores the dying experience." Godwin also published several non-fiction works based on her own life during this period.

Godwin's short story collections Dream Children and Mr. Bedford and the Muses focus on themes similar to those in her novels, but also incorporate dreams and myth. They tend to be less auto-biographical than her novels. According to philosopher Anna-Teresa Tymieniecka, Godwin's approach to dream-worlds is radical, because the dream is incorporated into the characters' real-world experiences. Her characters compare their real and dream worlds to each other in order to "negotiate their sense of destiny." She said Dream Children challenges the distinction between reality and dream experiences, where the dream does not "violate one's theory of reality."

USA Today said that the subjects covered in Unfinished Desires (2010) include "Mean girls. Lesbian kisses. Learning disabilities. Domestic violence. Alcoholism. [and] Roman Catholic nuns." According to The Times (London), Flora (2013) "encompasses most of the themes that have preoccupied [Godwin] throughout her career." It takes place in the South in the mid-1940s in the mountains, where a widowed schoolmaster raises his ten-year-old daughter. In a 2015 interview, Godwin says that her work has become less "angry". She said her early works showed a frustration with not being heard, and that her later books focuses on her enemies. Now she's working to understand "the villains' villains."

== Reception ==
By 1980 Godwin's writing had become the subject of essays, book chapters and other literary analysis from academic critics. According to The Washington Post, "Gail Godwin has been accused of not being able to decide whether she's a popular or a literary writer, but she's certainly accrued enough bestsellers and literary honors to claim both identities." Much of the scholarly attention on her works comes from those critics with an interest in southern or feminist authors. According to Contemporary Fiction Writers of the South, Godwin's books have been "widely and favorably reviewed". Contemporary American Women Fiction Writers states that "although some reviews of her work have been mixed ... her books are accomplished works of fiction, if not masterpieces."

Contemporary Literary Criticism said "most of her books are characterized as well-written, well executed, readable, witty, and having vivid, believable characters. Godwin is typically praised for having convincing plots, witty, intelligent characters and that she has strong narrative skill. She has been criticized, in particular in response to The Good Husband, for excessive symbolism. According to the Dictionary of Literary Biography, Godwin is "thoughtful and philosophical", but she is often critiqued for authoring fiction that is so closely representative of her own life.

The Odd Woman, The Finishing School and Southern Family received overall positive reviews, while Violet Clay and The Good Husband received more negative reviews. According to The Boston Globe, Flora was one of Godwin's best books.

== List of works ==
This list of works has been taken mostly from Gail Godwin's entry in the Dictionary of Literary Biography.

Novels

- The Perfectionists (1970)
- Glass People (1972)
- The Odd Woman (1974)
- Dream Children (1976)
- Violet Clay (1978)
- A Mother and Two Daughters (1982) ISBN 978-0-345-38923-7
- Mr. Bedford and the Muses (1983)
- The Finishing School (1984) ISBN 978-0-345-47226-7
- A Southern Family (1987)
- Father Melancholy's Daughter (1991) ISBN 978-0-380-72986-9
- The Good Husband (1994)
- Evensong (1999) ISBN 978-0-345-43477-7
- Evenings at Five (2003) ISBN 978-0-345-46103-2
- Queen of the Underworld (2006) ISBN 978-0-7393-2599-5
- Unfinished Desires (2009) ISBN 978-0-345-48321-8
- Flora (2013) ISBN 978-1-4088-4088-7
- Grief Cottage (2017) ISBN 978-1632867049
- Old Lovegood Girls (2020) ISBN 978-1-63286-822-0

Other works

- The Southern Belle (1975)
- Being on Everybody's Side (1979)
- Becoming a Writer (1980)
- Becoming the Characters in Your Own Novel (1982)
- Introduction to The Best American Short Stories (1985)
- Heart: A Personal Journal through its Myths and Meanings (2001)
- The Making of a Writer (2006)
- Publishing: A Writer's Memoir (2015) ISBN 978-1-62040-826-1
- Getting to Know Death (2024) ISBN 978-1-63973-444-3

== Personal life ==
Gail Godwin lives in a large house in the mountains in Woodstock, New York.
