= USTS =

USTS may refer to:

- United States Travel Service, a defunct portion of the United States Department of Commerce
- United States Treaty Series, a defunct publication of the United States Department of State
