= Creamola Foam =

Soft drink

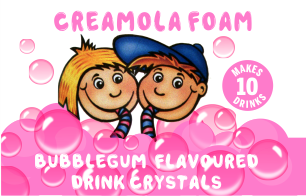
- Type: Soft drink
- Origin: Scotland
- Introduced: 1950

Creamola Foam is a soft drink produced in the form of effervescent crystals that are mixed with water. It was manufactured in Glasgow and sold in the UK from the 1950s, until Nestlé ended production in October 1998. Reintroduced by McCandlish Farmhouse Confectionery in 2019, the drink is primarily available in Scotland.

In 2005, Allan McCandlish of Cardross started producing a re-creation of Creamola Foam under the name ‘Kramola Fizz’.

In April 2019, his daughter Agnes and son Andrew of McCandlish Farmhouse Confectionery relaunched the product under its original name of Creamola Foam for worldwide production.

== Details ==
Creamola Foam came in the form of coloured crystals which were dissolved in cold water to form a sweet, fizzy drink. It was packaged in a small tin labelled with a cartoon girl and boy drinking with straws.

The drink originally came in raspberry, orange, and lemon flavours, and cola was later added.

The product was originally owned by Rowntrees before coming under the banner of Nestle UK until being sold off to Premier Foods.

The relaunched Creamola Foam drink comes in 17 flavours, including the original flavours which are raspberry, orange, lemon, and cola.

== Early form ==
The original packaging consisted of a small tin with a tight metal lid, normally pried off with a teaspoon. A paper seal covered the foam crystals.

The packaging included the phrases:

- "CREAMOLA FOAM CRYSTALS"
- "MAKES 10 BIG DRINKS"
- "FULLY SWEETENED"

The original ingredient list read:

- Sugar
- Fruit acids
- Sodium bicarbonate
- Gum acacia, a thickener/stabiliser
- Saccharin
- Saponin, a foaming agent
- flavouring
- colour

== Later revision ==
The revision introduced in the 1980s featured a plastic lid and modernised branding. The label reads, "Creamola FOAM". The ingredients were:

- Sugar
- Citric acid
- Sodium bicarbonate
- Tartaric acid
- Flavouring
- Saccharin, sweetener
- Gum acacia, stabiliser
- Extract of quillaia, a foaming agent
- Carmine, food coloring agent (in this example, raspberry flavor)

The effervescence, when the powder dissolves as it is stirred into water, is due to the reaction of the citric and tartaric acids with sodium bicarbonate, forming carbon dioxide gas. These weak organic "fruit" acids also provide a sharp taste. The addition of stabiliser and saponaceous foaming agents extends the life of the bubbles. The artificial colouring and flavouring, plus the fruit acids, give the impression of a fruity base, although the recipe is essentially synthetic.

== See also ==
- Fizzies, a similar drink in the US.
