= Glass People =

1972 novel by Gail Godwin

Glass People is the second novel written by American writer Gail Godwin. Published in 1972, the work was written while the author was teaching at the Iowa Writer's Workshop. The book concerns Francesca Bolt, a southern American woman who finds her marriage to a California politician puts constraints on her life.
