= Fizzies =

Tablet adding carbonation to water

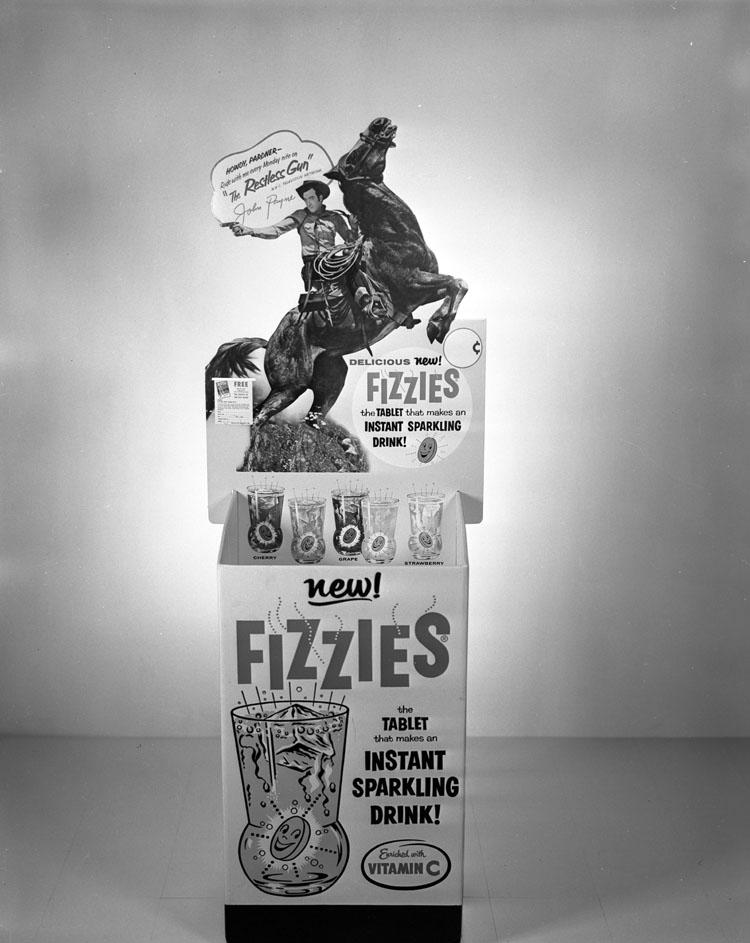
- Type: Tablet
- Place of origin: United States
- Created by: Lem Billings
- Invented: 1957; 69 years ago
- Serving temperature: With water

Fizzies were tablets that created a "carbonated" soft drink when added to water.

== History ==
=== Origin ===
Lem Billings, a close and long-time friend of President John F. Kennedy and the Kennedy family, has been credited as the inventor of Fizzies. "As Vice President at the Emerson Drug Company in Baltimore, he was responsible for inventing the 1950s fad drink Fizzies by adding a fruit flavor to disguise the sodium citrate taste." Once perfected, Emerson named the creation Fizzies. The tablet was dropped into a glass of water, then fizzed and dissolved, creating a sweet, effervescent drink.

Fizzies was introduced by Emerson on a regional basis in July 1957. In 1962, the Emerson Drug Company was acquired by Warner–Lambert, which sold the product nationally that same year.

In the 1950s and 1960s Fizzies came in seven flavors: grape, orange, cherry, lemon-lime, strawberry, root beer, and cola.

Fizzies' sales grew both nationally and internationally until 1968, achieving more than double the sales volume of Kool-Aid.

Fizzies was one of the sponsors for The Shari Lewis Show on NBC-TV in the early 1960s and pitched by Lewis herself.

The successful beverage became a cultural icon of its time. In the motion picture National Lampoon's Animal House, set in 1962, Dean Wormer reads a list of pranks committed by members of the Delta Tau Chi fraternity, which included dumping "a truckload of Fizzies" into a swimming pool during a swim meet.

=== Later history ===
The product's ingredients changed over time, as various artificial sweeteners were banned by the FDA. At certain times it was sweetened with cyclamates and saccharin. At one point the directions instructed children to add sugar and ice. In the early seventies, the manufacturer concluded that it would not be able to make a version that was both legal and sufficiently palatable to be profitable, and so discontinued the product.

After the introduction of NutraSweet, the brand was resurrected by Premiere Innovations, Inc. in the mid-1990s but its availability was short-lived and the company disappeared. Premiere Innovations marketed Fizzies as "Instant Sparkling Drink Tablets" that were "also great in milk", "only 10 calories" and "Vitamin C enriched".

The Fizzies brand reappeared in the 2000s. Previously owned and manufactured by Amerilab Technologies in Plymouth, Minnesota, Fizzies Drink Tablets were available in candy stores and through online retailers.

As of 2012, Fizzies was available in nine flavors: lemonade, root beer, cherry, orange, blue razz, hot cocoa, hot apple cider, cherry cola, and grape. It was marketed as a nostalgic drink to the baby boomer generation and as a fun way for kids to make their own flavorful drinks. In the past incarnation, the product had only 5 calories, was sweetened with sucralose, and contained Vitamin C in the form of ascorbic acid. In February or March 2016, Fizzies was again discontinued.

== See also ==
- Alka-Seltzer
- Bromo-Seltzer
- Creamola Foam, a similar drink produced in the UK
