= JFK: Reckless Youth =

Television series

JFK: Reckless Youth is a 1993 TV drama miniseries portraying the early life of American president John F. Kennedy. It was adapted from the 1992 biography of the same name by Nigel Hamilton. The adaptation was directed by Harry Winer and written by Hamilton and William Broyles Jr.

Patrick Dempsey played the young future president, while Terry Kinney, Loren Dean, Diana Scarwid and Robin Tunney portray members of his family.

== Plot ==
The miniseries portrays the life of John F. Kennedy from his school days to his 1946 victory in the election for Massachusetts's 11th congressional district. He attends the Protestant all-boys Dexter School in Boston and later the Choate School.

At Harvard, Kennedy joins the Spee Club. After traveling to England and Germany, he publishes Why England Slept. Upon returning to the United States, he is introduced to Inga Arvad by his sister Kathleen.

At the age of 29, Kennedy's father wants him to take over the congressional seat of James Curley, who would later become the mayor of Boston. With the help of his grandfather, Kennedy's campaign for the seat is successful.

== Cast ==
- Patrick Dempsey as John F. Kennedy
- Terry Kinney as Joseph P. Kennedy
- Loren Dean as Joe Kennedy Jr.
- Yolanda Jilot as Inga Arvad
- Robin Tunney as Kathleen "Kick" Kennedy
- Andrew Lowery as Lem Billings, JFK's school-mate
- Stan Cahill as Torb Macdonald
- Claire Forlani as Ann Cannon
- Malachy McCourt as John F. "Honey Fitz" Fitzgerald, JFK's grandfather
- James Rebhorn as St. John
- Diana Scarwid as Rose Kennedy
- Natalie Radford as Rosemary Kennedy
- Cedric Smith as Prof. Bruce Hopper
- Greg Spottiswood as Skeeter Orton
- Andrew Miller as Rip Horton
- Barry Morse as Lord Halifax

== Release and reception ==
The miniseries premiered on November 21, 1993, and was released on DVD on June 27, 2006. Ken Tucker, writing for Entertainment Weekly in 1993, gave the miniseries a B− rating, lauding Dempsey's performance, but saying "Whether you think the TV version of Reckless Youth is worth the film it was recorded on probably depends on how you feel about the value of a few good acting performances."

== See also ==
- Cultural depictions of John F. Kennedy
