= Hans Renders =

Hans Renders is a professor of History and Theory of Biography at the University of Groningen. Since 2004, he is also the head of the university's "Biography Institute" as of 2024 as honorary professor. In 2025, Biography across the Digitized Globe. Essays in Honour of Hans Renders (Brill) was published under the editorship of David Veltman and Daniel Meister.

== Career ==
Currently, Renders is board member of the journals Le Temps des Médias; Quaerendo. A Quarterly Journal from the Low Countries and ZL. Literair-historisch tijdschrift. From 2004 to 2015, he was a critic for OVT, a radio program of Dutch public broadcasting channel VPRO. In addition, since 1987, he has been a critic for Dutch newspapers Het Parool (1987-2025) and Vrij Nederland. Furthermore, he supplied until 2017 reviews of biographies for Historisch Nieuwsblad, chairs Biography Portal of the Netherlands, is vice-president of The Biography Society/La Société de Biography, and was from 2010 to 2018 a board member of Biographer's International Organization. In 2017, he was a visiting professor at L’Université d’Aix-Marseille, and in 2019 at The Australian National University in Canberra. He was also a member of the jury of the Institut Universitaire de France (IUF) from 2017 to 2019. Since 2025 he is book reviewer for EW Magazine.

Renders started his career as literary critic for De Brabant Pers and De Groene Amsterdammer in 1985. For years, he wrote for Intermediair, and he worked as a journalist for the Dutch newspaper NRC Handelsblad in the period of 1988 to 1995. Moreover, he has written for De Leeuwarder Courant, was a permanent critic for De Journalist from 1990 to 2002, and reviewed books written about journalism, history and media history for Media Facts and American Journalism History from 2003 to 2010. Currently, he is chief editor of Brill publishing's "Biography Studies" . Starting in 1987, he wrote reviews for Het Parool. In addition to this, he has been a permanent guest on OVT's monthly book column from 2004 to 2015, and started a monthly column on biographies in 2016 with his "Een Leven in Letters" (literally, 'A Life in Letters'), which can be heard every third Sunday of the month on the radio program Met het Oog op Morgen. Routledge listed him as one of their featured authors.

== Work on biography ==
Renders received a doctorate for his biography of Jan Hanlo, Zo meen ik dat ook jij bent. Since then, he has been focused on history and biography in academia, culminating in the founding of the Biography Institute in 2004. In 2000, Renders published Braak, a book about the renowned literary magazine of the Vijftigers, which featured authors such as Remco Campert and Lucebert. His biography of Jan Campert, Wie weet slaag ik in de dood was released in 2004. In that same year, he also published Gevaarlijk Drukwerk. Een Vrije Uitgeverij in Oorlogstijd. Renders is cofounder of the Jan Hanlo-Essayprijs, until 2018 jury member of the Plutarch Award for American biographies and since then a board member of the Nederlandse Biografie Prijs for Dutch biographies. He was, from the beginning in 2009 until 2018, also on the Board of Directors and since then a member of the Advisory Council at Biographers International Organization.

Renders' main argument is that "biography as a research area belongs to history." Therefore, it should be studied using a historical methodology. In order to achieve serious academic attention, Renders argues, scholars of biography studies should "present a more consistent and broadly based research methodology and theoretical framework." His major publications focus on the difference between biography and Life Writing, the biographical turn in history and the history of biography studies.

== Bibliography ==
- De Oplossing, ed. A.v.d. Hout (ps. of Wim Verhoeven) en Y ten Biezen (ps. of Hans Renders), Komplement, Tilburg 1984.
- Barbarber 1958–1971. Martinus Nijhoff, Leiden 1986.
- In collaboration with Ed Schilders: Ik pas in mijn koffer. Cadans, Nijmegen 1988.
- Verijdelde dromen. Een surrealitisch avontuur tussen de Stijl en Cobra. Uitgeverij Enschedé en Zn., Haarlem 1989.
- In collaboration with Willem Bierman: Ps(n)euboek voor Wim Hazeu (schrijver)|Wim Hazeu. Prado, Apeldoorn 1992.
- Braak, een kleine revolutie tussen Cobra en Atonaal. De Bezige Bij, Amsterdam 2000.
- vijf 5tigers vijftig jaar; een bloemlezing uit het werk van Remco Campert, Jan Elburg, Gerrit Kouwenaar, Lucebert, Bert Schierbeek, 4de dr., met een inleiding van Gerrit Kouwenaar en een nawoord van Hans Renders. De Bezige Bij, Amsterdam 2000.
- In collaboration with Paul Arnoldussen: Jong in de jaren dertig. De Prom, Baarn 1999, uitgebreide herdruk Aspekt, Soesterberg 2002.
- Jan Campert. Dat ik van binnen brand. Gedichten. De Bezige Bij, Amsterdam 2004.
- Gevaarlijk drukwerk, een uitgeverij in oorlogstijd. De Bezige Bij, Amsterdam 2004.
- Wie weet slaag ik in de dood. Biografie van Jan Campert. De Bezige Bij, Amsterdam 2004.
- Edited: Brieven van en aan Geertjan Lubberhuizen|Geert Lubberhuizen. De Bezige Bij, Amsterdam 2004.
- Het leven van een doodsbericht. De Bezige Bij, Amsterdam 2005.
- In collaboration with others: Inktpatronen. De Tweede Wereldoorlog en het boekbedrijf in Nederland en Vlaanderen. De Bezige Bij, Amsterdam 2006.
- Zo meen ik dat jij ook bent. Biografie van Jan Hanlo. De Arbeiderspers, Amsterdam 1998, bewerkte heruitgave De Bezige Bij, Amsterdam 2007.
- In collaboration with Jacques Dane: Biografie en psychologie. Boom, Amsterdam 2007.
- In collaboration with Gerrit Voerman: Privé in de politiek. Biografie. Boom, Amsterdam 2007.
- In collaboration with Jacques van Gerwen & Marcel Metze: De ondernemersbiografie. Mythe & Werkelijkheid, Boom, Amsterdam 2008.
- In collaboration with others: Tropenlevens. De [post]koloniale biografie, Boom, Amsterdam 2008.
- De zeven hoofdzonden van de biografie. Over biografen, historici en journalisten. Bert Bakker, Amsterdam 2008.
- Onder Ingenieurs. Boom, Amsterdam 2010.
- In collaboration with others: Biografie & Religie. De religieuze factor in de biografie. In de serie Biografie Studies. Boom, Amsterdam 2012.
- In collaboration with Binne de Haan: Theoretical Discussions of Biography. Approaches from History, Microhistory, and Life Writing. New York 2013. Second Edition, Brill Publishers, Leiden-Boston 2014.
- In collaboration with Max Pam en Piet Schreuders: Het motorzijspan van Willem Frederik Hermans. WM, Amsterdam 2015.
- In collaboration with Binne de Haan en Jonne Harmsma, The Biographical Turn, Lives in History. Routledge, London-New York 2017. (Turkish translation by VakıfBank Kültür Yayınları in 2024)
- In collaboration with Nigel Hamilton, The ABC of Modern Biography. Amsterdam University Press, Amsterdam 2018. (Translation in Dutch in 2018, the Persian translation at RITM, Tabriz 2021)
- In collaboration with David Veltman, Different Lives: Global Perspectives on Biography in Public Cultures and Societies. Brill Publishers, Leiden-Boston 2020.
- In collaboration with David Veltman, Fear of Theory.Towards a New Theoretical Justification of Biography. Brill Publishers, Leiden-Boston 2021.
- In collaboration with Sjoerd van Faassen, Theo van Doesburg 1883-1931. Ik sta helemaal alleen, De Bezige Bij, Amsterdam 2022.
- In collaboration with Max Pam and Piet Schreuders, Het universum van Willem Frederik Hermans. De Harmonie, Amsterdam 2023, 455 blz.
