= Denis Hamilton =

English newspaper editor

Sir Denis Hamilton
- Born: Charles Denis Hamilton; 6 December 1918; South Shields, England
- Died: 7 April 1988 (aged 69); London, England
- Occupation: Newspaper editor
- Spouse: Olive Hamilton (m. 1938)

Lieutenant Colonel Sir Charles Denis Hamilton, DSO, TD (6 December 1918 – 7 April 1988) was an English newspaper editor.

He was born in South Shields, County Durham, England, the son of an engineer from the Acklam iron and steel works who had retired early for health reasons. He was educated at the Middlesbrough High School for boys. He joined the Boy Scouts and attained the rank of King's Scout. His first job in the newspaper industry began in 1936 as reporter for the Middlesbrough Evening Gazette. During World War II he served in the British Army and was an officer under Field Marshal The 1st Viscount Montgomery of Alamein.

== World War II ==
In late 1944, Hamilton was a major and temporary Commanding Officer of the 11th Battalion of the Durham Light Infantry. At that time the battalion was broken up with the soldiers and officers dispersed as reinforcements to other units. Hamilton was transferred to the Duke of Wellington's Regiment 1/7th Battalion, as second in command under Lt Col Wilsey, in November. During December when the battalion was stationed at the bridgehead at Nijmegen he took temporary command of the 1/7th, on 2 December, whilst Wilsey took temporary command of the Brigade for a week. On the day he took command the battalion came under attack from German units at Haalderen, in an attempt to retake the bridge. A German officer, 2/Lt Heinich, 5 Coy 16 Parachute Regiment 6 Parachute Division, was captured by members of 'B' company, who were laying trip flares. Hamilton quickly organised a defence, using his Bren Gun Carriers to hold back the Germans. The attack continued for several days during which the battalion received heavy artillery and mortar fire. Large numbers of prisoners were taken from the 5th, 7th and 10th companies of the German 16 Para Regiment. Fighting intensified, taking in house to house action throughout Haalderen, where the German forces took heavy losses in killed and wounded. 'D' company of the Royal Scots Fusiliers moved in to support the 1/7th on 4 December. German artillery fire intensified on the battalion positions. By 7 December the main attack had been repulsed, though artillery, mortar and sniper attacks continued until the battalion was withdrawn to Nijmegen on 22 January. For his actions and leadership Hamilton was awarded a DSO. A few weeks later, in January 1945, Hamilton was promoted to lieutenant colonel and took command of the 1/7th Battalion, when Lieutenant Colonel Wilsey became the Brigade Commander.

== Post war ==
Hamilton left the armed forces in 1946. Upon returning to Britain, he became personal assistant to Gomer Berry, 1st Viscount Kemsley, owner of the Kemsley Newspapers group. Hamilton became the group's editorial director in 1950. In 1959, Berry sold the group (which owned The Sunday Times newspaper among others) to Roy Thomson, and Hamilton became editor of The Sunday Times. He introduced the first colour supplement of a British newspaper in 1962.

He became editor-in-chief and chairman of Times Newspapers Ltd., a group that included The Times, in 1967. During this period, Hamilton struggled with production unions over staff cutbacks and the introduction of computer technology. He was knighted in 1976. From 1978 to 1983, he served as president of the International Press Institute. In 1979 he became chairman of Reuters until his retirement in 1985.

Hamilton died in London and was survived by his wife, writer Olive Hamilton, and his four sons. One of his sons, Nigel Hamilton, is a Cambridge University educated historian and author.
