= Nigel Hamilton (author) =

British writer and broadcaster (born 1944)

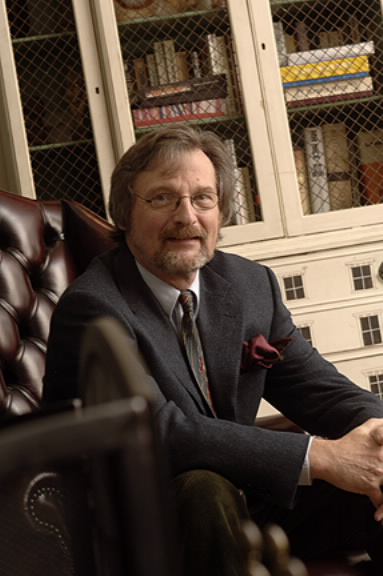
- Nigel Hamilton in 2008
- Born: 16 February 1944 (age 82); Alnmouth, Northumberland, England, United Kingdom
- Occupations: Non-fiction author, academic, broadcaster
- Children: Alexander, Sebastian, Nick and Christian
- Writing career
- Period: 1968–present
- Genres: Biography, art of life writing, Military history, American presidency, German literature, Topography

Nigel Hamilton (born 16 February 1944) is a British-born biographer, academic, and broadcaster, whose works have been translated into sixteen languages. In the United States, he is known primarily for his best-selling work on the young John F. Kennedy, JFK: Reckless Youth, which was made into an ABC miniseries. In the United Kingdom, he is known for Monty, a three-volume official life of Field Marshal The 1st Viscount Montgomery of Alamein, a senior military commander in World War II, which won both the 1981 Whitbread Award and the Templer Medal for Military History.

He has also written about the lives of Thomas Mann and former President Bill Clinton as well as numerous other works in a variety of fields. His film on the life of Field Marshal Lord Montgomery won the New York Blue Ribbon Award for Best Documentary. He founded the British Institute of Biography and became the first professor of biography in the UK at De Montfort University. He is currently senior fellow at the John W. McCormack Graduate School of Policy Studies, University of Massachusetts, Boston, where he wrote a modern version of The Twelve Caesars, titled American Caesars: Franklin D. Roosevelt to George W. Bush, published in September 2010 by Yale University Press.

== Early life and career ==
Hamilton was born in Alnmouth, Northumberland, but spent his early life in London, where his father, Lt-Colonel Sir Denis Hamilton, a distinguished World War II battalion commander in the Duke of Wellington's Regiment, became a pioneering editor of The Sunday Times, chairman and editor-in-chief of The Times, chairman of Reuters, and trustee of the British Museum and British Library. Hamilton was educated at Westminster School with his twin brother Adrian, who later became a prominent British journalist for the London Observer, Times and Independent.

He then attended LMU Munich and Trinity College, Cambridge, where he received an honours degree in history and a master's degree. Subsequently, he trained under André Deutsch and Diana Athill as a book publisher at André Deutsch Publishers. After leaving Deutsch, he taught at a school in Greenwich, where he assisted in reviving the historic borough on the River Thames. Hamilton opened a bookstore and began writing with his mother, Olive Hamilton, the first history of Greenwich in nearly a century, Royal Greenwich. He wrote several more guide books and edited the arts page in a London newspaper.

== Biographer ==
After moving to Suffolk, Hamilton published his first major biography in 1978, The Brothers Mann, recording the lives of the German novelists Heinrich and Thomas Mann which received high praise in Britain and the United States and was translated into several languages.

In 1981, Hamilton published the first volume of his official life of Field Marshal The 1st Viscount Montgomery of Alamein, Monty: The Making of a General, 1887–1942, which established Hamilton's international reputation as a military historian and biographer. This work was followed by Monty: Master of the Battlefield, 1942–1944, and Monty: The Field Marshal, 1944–1976. The Making of a General won the Whitbread Award for Biography in 1981, and the Templer Medal for Best Contribution to Military History in 1986.

Working with Robin Whitby, a Cambridge colleague, in 1987, Hamilton founded Biografia Publishers and The Biography Bookshop in Covent Garden in Central London to promote the field of biography.

In 1988, Hamilton moved to the United States to undertake a book on the life of former President John F. Kennedy and he was named the John F. Kennedy Scholar at the University of Massachusetts, Boston, and a visiting professor of history. The first volume of his biography was published by Random House in the autumn of 1992 as JFK: Reckless Youth. The New York Times Book Review welcomed it as "rich, gripping... a book not only about a remarkable young John F. Kennedy but also about American democracy’s own still reckless age." It became a New York Times bestseller and film rights were sold to Hearst Entertainment, who turned it into a television mini-series, JFK: Reckless Youth, which starred Patrick Dempsey as the young Kennedy. The book was intended to be the first of a three-volume series on Kennedy, but following its publication, Hamilton "lost access to critical primary source documents and was forced to abandon the series."

In 1994, Hamilton moved back to the UK, where he became visiting professor of history at Royal Holloway, University of London, and Professor of Biography at De Montfort University, in Leicester. He set up the British Institute of Biography and led Royal Holloway's bid to create the first public and academic centre for biography in Britain, the Biorama Project.

Hamilton again returned to the United States to undertake a two-volume biographical work on the life of former president, Bill Clinton. The first volume was published as Bill Clinton: An American Journey in 2003 while the second volume, Bill Clinton: Mastering the Presidency (taking Clinton's life up to 1996), followed in 2007. Both were lauded in the press and received outstanding reviews.

Having become senior fellow at the John W. McCormack Graduate School of Policy Studies and a visiting scholar at both Georgetown University and George Washington University in 2005, Hamilton returned to his first love, the study of the art of biography. He published Biography: A Brief History in 2007, to high acclaim from The New York Times and followed in 2008 with How To Do Biography: A Primer, based on his many years of teaching and life writing, which received additional praise for Hamilton's work on the art of biography.

Hamilton followed with a modern version of the classic history of the great emperors of Rome, The Twelve Caesars, written early in the second century A.D. by the biographer and historian Suetonius. Published by Yale University Press in September 2010, American Caesars records the lives of the last twelve American presidents, from Franklin Delano Roosevelt to George W. Bush, and is Hamilton's most ambitious work to date.

Hamilton also reviews books for The Boston Sunday Globe, The Journal of Military History and the London Review of Books, among others. He has had op-ed pieces and articles in The New York Times, The Independent of London, and the Times Higher Education, among others. Hamilton has contributed to dozens of television documentary programmes and lectures at many universities around the world on his work.

== Personal life ==
Hamilton was married to Hannelore Pfeifer, a doctoral student of German literature at LMU Munich, and had two children, Alexander and Sebastian. Following her death in 1973, Hamilton married Outi Palovesi in 1976 and together, they had two more children, Nick and Christian. In 2005, the marriage was dissolved and Hamilton married his third wife, Raynel Shepard, in 2006. Shepard is a curriculum developer in ESL for the Boston Public Schools and a university lecturer in education. Nigel Hamilton is a United States citizen.

== Work ==
=== Books ===
- Royal Greenwich; A Guide and History of London’s Most Historic Borough – 1969 (with Olive Hamilton) ISBN 0-900293-01-2
- Greenwich in Colour: A Guide for the Visitor – 1970 ISBN 0-900293-02-0
- Nigel Hamilton's Guide to Greenwich: A Personal Guide to the Buildings and Walks of One of England's Most Beautiful and Historic Areas – 1972 ISBN 0-900293-04-7
- America Began at Greenwich – 1976 ISBN 0-905242-01-7
- The Brothers Mann: The Lives of Heinrich and Thomas Mann, 1871–1950 and 1875–1955 – 1978 ISBN 0-436-19103-2
- Monty: The Making of a General, 1887–1942 – 1981 ISBN 0-241-10583-8
- A Case of Literary Fratricide: The Brüderzwist Between Heinrich and Thomas Mann in Norman Kiell, ed Blood Brothers: Siblings As Writers – 1983 ISBN 0-8236-0545-0
- Monty: Master of the Battlefield, 1942–1944 – 1984 (U.S. title: Master of the Battlefield: Monty's War Years 1942–1944) ISBN 0-241-11104-8
- Thomas Mann in Jeffrey Meyers, ed The Craft of Literary Biography – 1985 ISBN 0-333-37348-0
- Monty: The Field-Marshal, 1944–1976 – 1986 (U.S. title: Monty: Final Years of the Field-Marshal, 1944–1976) ISBN 0-241-11838-7
- Monty: The Man Behind the Legend – 1987 ISBN 1-85291-006-2
- Editor-in-Chief: The Fleet Street Memoirs of Sir Denis Hamilton – 1989 (Sir Denis Hamilton with Nigel Hamilton) ISBN 0-241-12591-X
- The Price of Independence: Finland-USSR in Frontiers – 1990 (with Nadine Gordimer, Ronald Eyre, Chris Hitchens, et al.) ISBN 0-563-20701-9
- D-Day: Gemeinsame Operationen und die Frage der Führung in Gerhard P. Groß, ed, Führungsdenken in europäischen und nordamerikanischen Streitkräften im 19. und 20. Jahrhundert – 2001 ISBN 3-8132-0762-5
- JFK: Reckless Youth – 1992 ISBN 0-679-41216-6
- Monty: The Battles of Field Marshal Bernard Law Montgomery – 1994 ISBN 0-679-43341-4
- The Full Monty: Montgomery of Alamein 1887–1942 – 2001 ISBN 0-7139-9334-0
- Bill Clinton, An American Journey: Great Expectations – 2003 ISBN 0-375-50610-1
- Montgomery of Alamein in Annabel and Neil Wenborn, eds British Military Greats – 2004 ISBN 1-84403-255-8
- Montgomery: D-Day Commander – 2007 ISBN 1-57488-904-4
- Bill Clinton: Mastering the Presidency – 2007 ISBN 1-58648-665-9
- Biography: A Brief History – 2007 ISBN 978-0-674-02466-3
- How To Do Biography: A Primer – 2008 ISBN 978-0-674-02796-1
- American Caesars: Lives of the Presidents from Franklin D. Roosevelt to George W. Bush – 2010 ISBN 978-0-300-16928-7
- The Mantle of Command: FDR at War, 1941–1942 – Houghton Mifflin Harcourt; 2014 ISBN 978-0547775241
- Commander in Chief: FDR's Battle with Churchill, 1943 – 2016 ISBN 978-0-544-94446-6
- In collaboration with Hans RendersThe ABC of Modern Biography 2018 ISBN 978-94-6298-871-2
- War and Peace: FDR’s Final Odyssey, D-Day to Yalta, 1943–1945 – 2019 ISBN 978-0-544-87680-4
- Lincoln vs. Davis: The War of the Presidents – 2024 ISBN 978-0-316-56463-2

=== Books on tape ===
- JFK: Reckless Youth Abridged and read by the author – 1993 ISBN 1-879371-56-1
- JFK: Reckless Youth Unabridged and read by Alexander Adams – 1994 ISBN 1-879371-56-1
- Bill Clinton: Mastering the Presidency Abridged and read by James Adams – 2007 ISBN 978-1-4332-0494-4

=== Filmography ===
- Monty – In Love and War (1987) – writer and presenter
- Thomas Mann’s The Magic Mountain, The Modern World: Ten Great Writers series (1988) – presenter
- Big Brother’s Bargain, Finland-Russia (1990) – writer and presenter
- The Kennedys, The American Experience (1992) – consultant and contributor
- JFK: Reckless Youth (1993) – writer

== Reviews ==
- Webster, William T. (1982), review of The Brothers Mann: The Lives of Heinrich and Thomas Mann, in Murray, Glen (ed.), Cencrastus No. 8, Spring 1982, p. 48, ISSN 0264-0856
