= United States Travel and Tourism Administration =

US government agency (1961–1996)

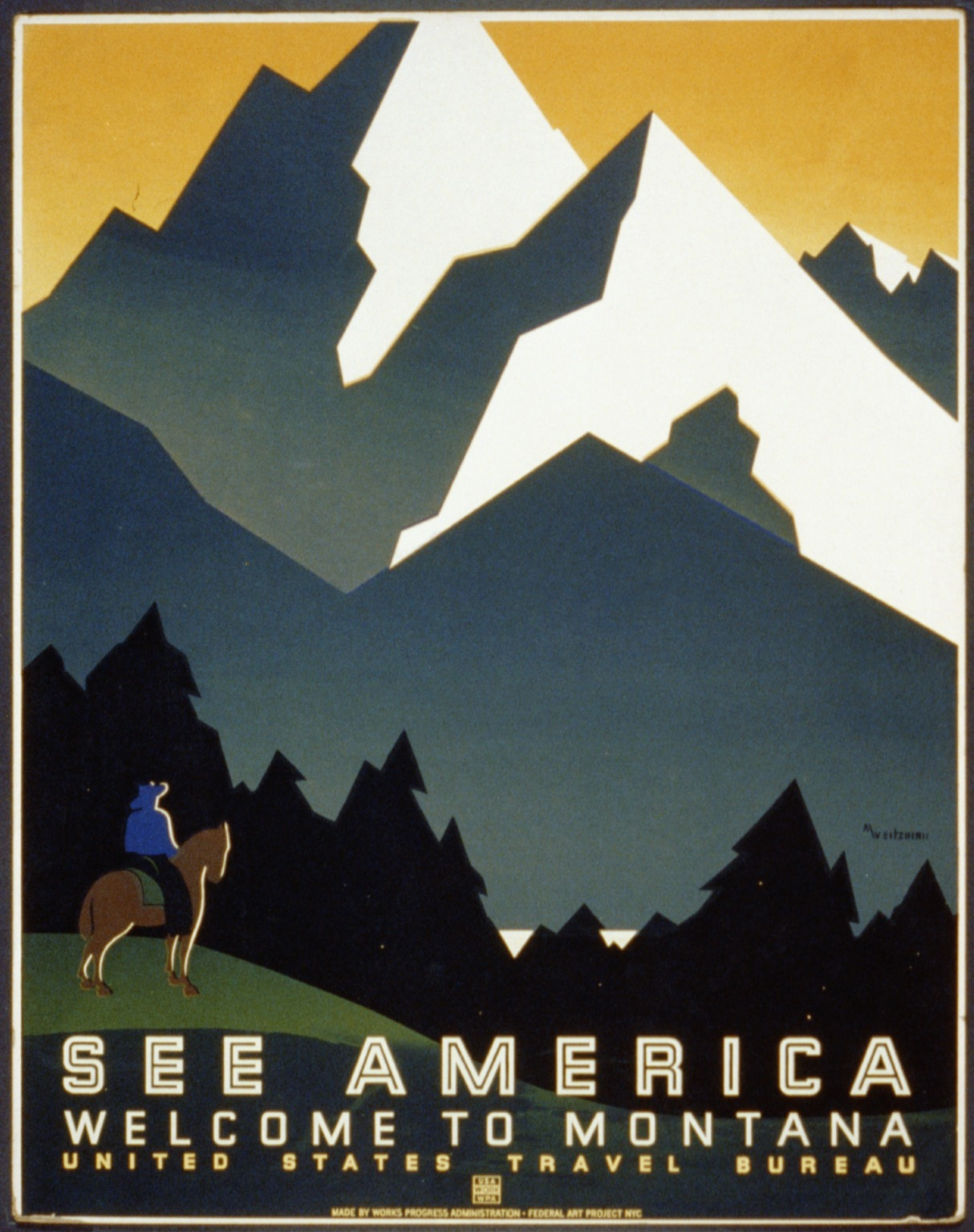
Example of Promotion Picture For This Campaign

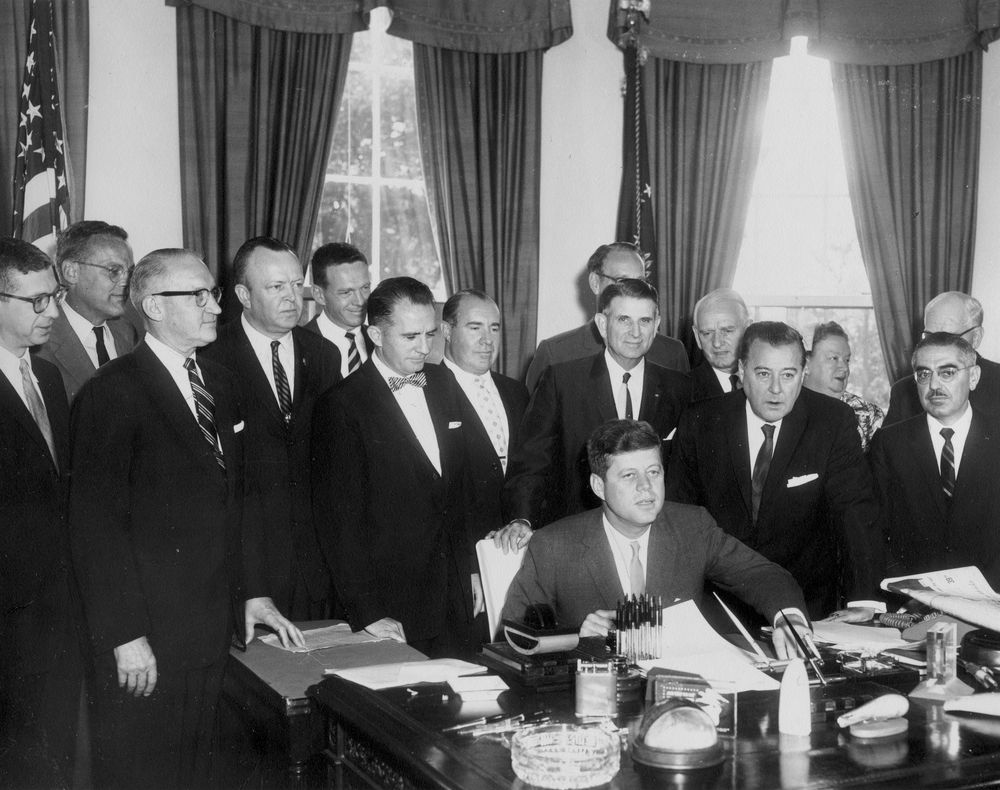
President Kennedy signs legislation creating the USTTA on June 29, 1961.

The United States Travel and Tourism Administration (USTTA) operated the country's official travel and tourism offices worldwide. It was established in 1981 by the National Tourism Policy Act, succeeding the United States Travel Service in its role of promoting travel to the United States. The U.S. Travel Service was created by the United States Secretary of Commerce on July 1, 1961, pursuant to the International Travel Act of 1961 (75 Stat. 129; 22 U.S.C. 2121 note) after President John F. Kennedy signed Senate Bill 610 on June 29, 1961. It was created to address a deficit in tourism in the United States.

In 1996, the U.S. government decided that it would no longer need such and closed all offices. Since, there are some Visit USA Committees in countries where many U.S. tourism companies have offices.

== See also ==
- International Trade Administration
- International Travel Act of 1961
